= 1904 in paleontology =

List of years in paleontology	(table)
- … 1894; 1895; 1896; 1897; 1898; 1899; 1900; 1901; 1902; 1903; 1904; 1905; 1906; 1907; 1908; 1909; 1910; 1911; 1912; 1913; 1914 …
- In science 1901 1902 1903 1904 1905 1906 1907
- Art; Archaeology; Architecture; Literature; Music; Philosophy; Science; +...

Paleontology or palaeontology is the study of prehistoric life forms on Earth through the examination of plant and animal fossils. This includes the study of body fossils, tracks (ichnites), burrows, cast-off parts, fossilised feces (coprolites), palynomorphs and chemical residues. Because humans have encountered fossils for millennia, paleontology has a long history both before and after becoming formalized as a science. This article records significant discoveries and events related to paleontology that occurred or were published in the year 1904.

== Dinosaurs ==
=== Newly named dinosaurs ===
Data courtesy of George Olshevsky's dinosaur genera list.

Name	Novelty	Status	Authors	Age	Unit	Location	Notes	Images
Algoasaurus	Gen et sp nov	Nomen dubium.	Broom	Late Jurassic-Early Cretaceous	Kirkwood Formation	South Africa	now considered an indeterminate sauropod	Algoasaurus
Centrosaurus	gen et sp nov	Valid	Lambe	Late Cretaceous	Dinosaur Park Formation	Canada (Alberta)	Type species: Centrosaurus apertus	Centrosaurus

== Plesiosaurs ==
- Plesiosaur gastroliths documented.

== Synapsids ==
=== Non-mammalian ===
Name	Novelty	Status	Authors	Age	Unit	Location	Notes	Images
Glanosuchus	Gen et sp nov	Valid	Broom	Middle Permian	Middle Abrahamskraal Formation	South Africa	A member of Scylacosauridae.	Glanosuchus
Placerias	Gen et sp nov	Valid	Lucas	Late Triassic (Carnian)	Chinle Formation	USA (Arizona and North Carolina)	A member of Stahleckeriidae.	Placerias
Prodicynodon	Gen et sp nov	Valid	Broom	Late Permian				
Scapanodon	Gen et sp nov	Junior synonym	Broom	Middle Permian			A junior synonym of Titanosuchus.	

=== Metatherians ===
Name	Authors	Age	Location	Notes	Images
Argyrolagus	Ameghino	4 Millions years ago	Argentina	A Distante relative of the Shrew Opossum	

=== Eutherians ===
==== Cetaceans ====
Name	Novelty	Status	Authors	Age	Unit	Location	Notes	Images
Eocetus	Nom. nov.	Valid	Fraas	Middle Eocene (Bartonian)	Giushi Formation	Egypt; Morocco	A protocetid. Replacement name for Mesocetus Fraas, 1904 (non van Beneden, 1880).	
Mesocetus	Gen. et. sp. nov		Fraas	Middle Eocene (Bartonian)				
Protocetus	Gen. et sp. nov.	Valid	Fraas	Middle Eocene (Lutetian)	Mokattam Formation	Egypt	A protocetid.	

== Even-toed Ungulates ==
Name	Status	Authors	Age	Location	Notes	Images
Prosthennops	Valid	Matthew	10 Millions of years ago	Honduras; Mexico; USA (Alabama, Florida, Kansas, Maryland, Nebraska, Nevada, Oregon, South Dakota, Texas, Virginia and Washington)	An Extinct Tayassuid.	
