= 1908 in paleontology =

List of years in paleontology	(table)
- … 1898; 1899; 1900; 1901; 1902; 1903; 1904; 1905; 1906; 1907; 1908; 1909; 1910; 1911; 1912; 1913; 1914; 1915; 1916; 1917; 1918 …
- In science 1905 1906 1907 1908 1909 1910 1911
- Art; Archaeology; Architecture; Literature; Music; Philosophy; Science; +...

Paleontology or palaeontology is the study of prehistoric life forms on Earth through the examination of plant and animal fossils. This includes the study of body fossils, tracks (ichnites), burrows, cast-off parts, fossilised feces (coprolites), palynomorphs and chemical residues. Because humans have encountered fossils for millennia, paleontology has a long history both before and after becoming formalized as a science. This article records significant discoveries and events related to paleontology that occurred or were published in the year 1908.

== Arthropoda ==
=== Newly named insects ===
Name	Novelty	Status	Authors	Age	Unit	Location	Notes	Images
Anabrus caudeli	Sp nov		Cockerell	Eocene; Priabonian	Florissant Formation	USA; Colorado	A platycleidine tettigoniid Mormon cricket relative	Anabrus caudeli
Cecidomyia(?) pontaniiformis	Sp nov		Cockerell	Eocene; Priabonian	Florissant Formation	USA; Colorado	A cecidomyiine gall midge gall Gall on Myrica drymeia	Cecidomyia pontaniiformis gall on Myrica drymeia
Dryobius miocenicus	Sp nov		Beutenmüller & Cockerell	Eocene; Priabonian	Florissant Formation	USA; Colorado	A cerambycine longhorned beetle	Dryobius miocenicus
Electromyrmex	Gen et sp nov	nom nudum	Wheeler	Lutetian	Baltic amber	Europe	A nyrmicine ant. Type species E. klebsi Validly described in 1910	Electromyrmex klebsi
Eriophyes(?) beutenmulleri	Sp nov		Cockerell	Eocene; Priabonian	Florissant Formation	USA; Colorado	An eriophyid gall mite gall Described from galls on a possible Salix leaf	Eriophyes beutenmulleri galls on Salix sp.
Glossina oligocena	Comb nov		(Scudder) Cockerell	Eocene; Priabonian	Florissant Formation	USA; Colorado	A Glossinid tsetse fly moved from Paloestrus oligocenus (1892)	Glossina oligocenus
Lithogryllites	Gen et sp nov		Cockerell	Eocene; Priabonian	Florissant Formation	USA; Colorado	A cricket relative The type species is L. lutzii	Lithogryllites lutzii
Necrodes primaevus	Sp nov		Beutenmüller & Cockerell	Eocene; Priabonian	Florissant Formation	USA; Colorado	A silphine carrion beetle	Necrodes primaevus
Nymphalites scudderi	Sp nov		Beutenmüller & Cockerell	Eocene; Priabonian	Florissant Formation	USA; Colorado	A nymphaline brush-footed butterfly	Nymphalites scudderi
Panorpa arctiiformis	Sp nov		Cockerell	Eocene; Priabonian	Florissant Formation	USA; Colorado	A scorpionfly	Panorpa arctiiformis
Phenacolestes	Gen et sp nov		Cockerell	Eocene; Priabonian	Florissant Formation	USA; Colorado	A dysagrionine odonate The type species is P. mirandus Also tentatively included is P.(?) parallelus	Phenacolestes mirandus
Phymatodes volans	Sp nov		Beutenmüller & Cockerell	Eocene; Priabonian	Florissant Formation	USA; Colorado	A callidiine cerambycine longhorned beetle	Phymatodes volans
Polystoechotes piperatus	Sp nov	jr synonym	Cockerell	Eocene; Priabonian	Florissant Formation	USA; Colorado	An ithonid giant lacewing Moved to Propsychopsis piperatus in 1943 moved to Polystoechotites piperatus in 2006	Polystoechotites piperatus

== Archosauromorphs ==
=== Newly named basal archosauromorphs ===
Name	Novelty	Status	Authors	Age	Unit	Location	Notes	Images
Scaphonyx		Synonym of Hyperodapedon	Woodward	Late Triassic (Carnian)	Santa Maria Formation	Brazil	A hyperodapedontid rhynchosaur.	

=== Newly named dinosaurs ===
Data courtesy of George Olshevsky's dinosaur genera list.

Name	Status	Authors	Age	Unit	Location	Notes	Images
Ankylosaurus	Valid taxon	Barnum Brown	Late Cretaceous (Lancian)	Hell Creek Formation Lance Formation Scollard Formation	Canada; United States	An ankylosaurid.	Ankylosaurus
"Gigantosaurus"	Preoccupied.	Eberhard Fraas	Late Jurassic (Kimmeridgian-Tithonian)	Tendaguru Formation	Tanzania	Preoccupied by Harry Govier Seeley, 1869 renamed Tornieria.	Ankylosaurus
Halticosaurus	Nomen dubium.	Friedrich von Huene	Late Triassic (early Norian)	Stubensandstein	Germany	A coelophysoid theropod.	Ankylosaurus
"Pachysaurus"	Preoccupied.	Friedrich von Huene	Late Triassic (middle Norian)	Trossingen Formation	Germany	Preoccupied by Fitzinger, 1843 renamed Pachysauriscus.	Ankylosaurus
Sellosaurus	Valid taxon	Friedrich von Huene	Late Triassic (early Norian)	Stubensandstein	Germany	A plateosaurid sauropodomorph.	Ankylosaurus

== Synapsids ==
=== Non-mammalian ===
Name	Status	Authors	Age	Unit	Location	Notes	Images
Alopecodon	Valid	Broom	Middle Permian	Middle Abrahamskraal Formation	South Africa	A scylaosaurid theriodont.	Tetraceratops
Kannemeyeria	Valid	Seeley	Early-Middle Triassic (late Olenekian to Anisian)	Burgersdorp Formation	South Africa	A kannemeyeriid dicynodont.	Tetraceratops
Tetraceratops	Valid	Matthew	Early Permian	Arroyo Formation	US	Possibly a basal therapsid.	Tetraceratops
Trochosuchus	Nomen dubium	Broom	Middle Permian	Middle Abrahamskraal Formation	South Africa	Named from fossils belonging to Lycosuchidae.	Tetraceratops
