= 1902 in paleontology =

List of years in paleontology	(table)
- … 1892; 1893; 1894; 1895; 1896; 1897; 1898; 1899; 1900; 1901; 1902; 1903; 1904; 1905; 1906; 1907; 1908; 1909; 1910; 1911; 1912 …
- In science 1899 1900 1901 1902 1903 1904 1905
- Art; Archaeology; Architecture; Literature; Music; Philosophy; Science; +...

Paleontology or palaeontology is the study of prehistoric life forms on Earth through the examination of plant and animal fossils. This includes the study of body fossils, tracks (ichnites), burrows, cast-off parts, fossilised feces (coprolites), palynomorphs and chemical residues. Because humans have encountered fossils for millennia, paleontology has a long history both before and after becoming formalized as a science. This article records significant discoveries and events related to paleontology that occurred or were published in the year 1902.

== Plants ==
=== Ferns and allies ===
Name	Novelty	Status	Authors	Age	Type locality	Location	Notes	Images
Ctenopteris columbiensis	Sp nov		Penhallow	Lower Cretaceous		Canada; British Columbia	A Ctenopteris pinnule	
Sagenopteris oblongifolia	Sp nov		Penhallow	Lower Cretaceous		Canada; British Columbia	A Sagenopteris pinnule	

=== Conifers ===
Name	Novelty	Status	Authors	Age	Type locality	Location	Notes	Images
Pseudotsuga miocena	Sp nov	valid	Penhallow	Eocene; Ypresian	Okanagan Highlands; Horsefly Shales	Canada; British Columbia	A douglas fir wood morphospecies	Pseudotsuga miocena

=== Angiosperms ===
Name	Novelty	Status	Authors	Age	Type locality	Location	Notes	Images
Clintonia oblongifolia	Sp nov		Penhallow	Eocene	Paskapoo Formation	Canada; Alberta	A Clintonia leaf morphospecies	
Majanthemophyllum grandifolium	Sp nov		Penhallow	Eocene		Canada; Alberta	A green briar leaf morphospecies	
Viburnum ovatum	Sp nov		Penhallow	Eocene		Canada; Alberta	A viburnum leaf morphospecies	

== Turtles ==
=== New turtle taxa ===
Taxon	Novelty	Status	Author(s)	Age	Unit	Location	Notes	Images
Baena antiqua	Sp. nov.	Valid	Lambe	Campanian	Dinosaur Park Formation	Alberta	A species of Baena	
Neurankylus	Gen. et sp. nov.	Valid	Lambe	Campanian	Dinosaur Park Formation	Alberta	A chelydrid turtle	

== Archosauromorphs ==
=== Dinosaurs ===
==== New dinosaur taxa ====
Taxon	Novelty	Status	Author(s)	Age	Unit	Location	Notes	Images
Dacentrurus	Gen. nov.	Valid	Lucas	Kimmeridgian	Kimmeridge Clay	UK	A new name for Omosaurus armatus Owen, 1875 non Leidy, 1856.	
Didanodon	Gen. nov.	Nomen dubium	Osborn	Campanian	Dinosaur Park Formation	Alberta	A new genus name for Trachodon altidens Lambe, 1902.	
Elosaurus	Gen. et sp. nov.	Jr. synonym	Peterson & Gilmore	Kimmeridgian	Morrison Formation	US	Genus is a junior synonym of Brontosaurus, while the species has been reassigned as Brontosaurus parvus.	
Hoplitosaurus	Gen. nov.	Valid	Lucas	Barremian	Lakota Formation	USA	New genus name for Stegosaurus marshi (Lucas, 1901).	
Monoclonius belli	Sp. nov.	Valid	Lambe	Campanian	Dinosaur Park Formation	Alberta	Later given the genus name Chasmosaurus	
Monoclonius canadensis	Sp. nov.	Jr. synonym	Lambe	Campanian	Dinosaur Park Formation	Alberta	Junior synonym of Chasmosaurus belli	
Monoclonius dawsoni	Sp. nov.	Nomen dubium	Lambe	Campanian	Dinosaur Park Formation	Alberta	A dubious species of ceratopsid	
Onychosaurus	Gen. et sp. nov.	Nomen dubium	Nopcsa	Campanian			A dubious name that may be a synonym of Zalmoxes.	
Ornithomimus altus	Sp. nov.	Valid	Lambe	Campanian	Dinosaur Park Formation	Alberta	Later given the genus name Struthiomimus	
Palaeoscincus asper	Sp. nov.	Nomen dubium	Lambe	Campanian	Dinosaur Park Formation	Alberta	A dubious species of ankylosaurid.	
Stegoceras	Gen. et sp. nov.	Valid	Lambe	Campanian	Dinosaur Park Formation	Alberta	A pachycephalosaur	
Stereocephalus tutus	Gen. et sp. nov.	Preoccupied	Lambe	Campanian	Dinosaur Park Formation	Alberta	Later renamed Euoplocephalus	
Trachodon (Pteropelyx) altidens	Sp. nov.	Nomen dubium	Lambe	Campanian	Dinosaur Park Formation	Alberta	A dubious species of hadrosaurid. Given the genus name Didanodon by Osborn in 1902.	
Trachodon (Pteropelyx) marginatus	Sp. nov.	Nomen dubium	Lambe	Campanian	Dinosaur Park Formation	Alberta	A dubious species of hadrosaurid. Later given the genus name Stephanosaurus	
Trachodon (Pteropelyx) selwyni	Sp. nov.	Nomen dubium	Lambe	Campanian	Dinosaur Park Formation	Alberta	A dubious species of hadrosaurid	

=== Phytosaurs ===
==== New phytosaur taxa ====
Name	Novelty	Status	Authors	Age	Unit	Location	Notes	Images
Rileya	Gen. et sp. nov	Preoccupied	von Huene	Rhaetian			A junior homonym of Rileya Ashmead, 1888 (hymenopteran). Renamed Rileyasuchus Kuhn, 1961.	

=== Protorosaurs ===
Name	Novelty	Status	Authors	Age	Unit	Location	Notes	Images
Procerosaurus	gen et sp nov	jr synonym	von Huene				jr synonym of Tanystropheus.	

== Mammals ==
=== New mammal taxa ===
Taxon	Novelty	Status	Author(s)	Age	Unit	Location	Notes	Images
Ptilodus primaevus	Sp. nov.	Valid	Lambe	Campanian	Dinosaur Park Formation	Alberta	A species of Ptilodus	
Boreodon	Gen. et sp. nov.	Nomen dubium	Lambe	Campanian	Dinosaur Park Formation	Alberta	A species of multituberculate	

== Fish ==
=== New fish taxa ===
Taxon	Novelty	Status	Author(s)	Age	Unit	Location	Notes	Images
Acipenser albertensis	Sp. nov.	Nomen dubium	Lambe	Campanian	Dinosaur Park Formation	Alberta	A species of Acipenser	
Diphyodus	Gen. et sp. nov.	Valid	Lambe	Campanian	Dinosaur Park Formation	Alberta	A species of fish	
