= 1900 in paleontology =

| List of years in paleontology | (table) |
- … 1890; 1891; 1892; 1893; 1894; 1895; 1896; 1897; 1898; 1899; 1900; 1901; 1902; 1903; 1904; 1905; 1906; 1907; 1908; 1909; 1910 …
- In science 1897 1898 1899 1900 1901 1902 1903
- Art; Archaeology; Architecture; Literature; Music; Philosophy; Science; +...

Paleontology or palaeontology is the study of prehistoric life forms on Earth through the examination of plant and animal fossils. This includes the study of body fossils, tracks (ichnites), burrows, cast-off parts, fossilised feces (coprolites), palynomorphs and chemical residues. Because humans have encountered fossils for millennia, paleontology has a long history both before and after becoming formalized as a science. This article records significant discoveries and events related to paleontology that occurred or were published in the year 1900.

== Dinosaurs ==
=== New taxa ===
| Taxon | Novelty | Status | Author(s) | Age | Unit | Location | Notes | Images |
|---|---|---|---|---|---|---|---|---|
| Limnosaurus | Gen. et sp. nov. | Preoccupied | Nopcsa | Maastrichtian | Sânpetru Formation | Romania | A hadrosaurid preoccupied by Limnosaurus Marsh, 1872 later given the genus name Telmatosaurus | |

== Sauropterygia ==
=== Newly named plesiosaurs ===
| Name | Novelty | Status | Authors | Age | Unit | Location | Notes | Images |
|---|---|---|---|---|---|---|---|---|
| Cimoliasaurus laramiensis | sp. nov. | junior synonym | Knight | Oxfordian | Sundance Formation, Wyoming | USA | recombined as Tatenectes laramiensis in 2003 | |

== Synapsids ==
=== Non-mammalian ===
| Name | Novelty | Status | Authors | Age | Unit | Location | Notes | Images |
|---|---|---|---|---|---|---|---|---|
| Dicranozygoma | Gen. et sp. nov | Nomen dubium | Seeley | Late Permian | Cistecephalus Assemblage Zone | South Africa | A dicynodont of uncertain position | |
| Ictidosuchus | Gen. et sp. nov | Valid | Broom | Late Permian | Tropidostoma Assemblage Zone | South Africa | A member of Baurioidea. | |
