= 1903 in paleontology =

List of years in paleontology	(table)
- … 1893; 1894; 1895; 1896; 1897; 1898; 1899; 1900; 1901; 1902; 1903; 1904; 1905; 1906; 1907; 1908; 1909; 1910; 1911; 1912; 1913 …
- In science 1900 1901 1902 1903 1904 1905 1906
- Art; Archaeology; Architecture; Literature; Music; Philosophy; Science; +...

Paleontology or palaeontology is the study of prehistoric life forms on Earth through the examination of plant and animal fossils. This includes the study of body fossils, tracks (ichnites), burrows, cast-off parts, fossilised feces (coprolites), palynomorphs and chemical residues. Because humans have encountered fossils for millennia, paleontology has a long history both before and after becoming formalized as a science. This article records significant discoveries and events related to paleontology that occurred or were published in the year 1903.

== Dinosaurs ==
=== New taxa ===
Taxon	Novelty	Status	Author(s)	Age	Unit	Location	Notes	Images
Brachiosaurus	Gen. et sp. nov.	Valid	Riggs	Late Jurassic	Morrison Formation	Colorado	A brachiosaurid	
Claosaurus affinis	Sp. nov.	Nomen dubium	Wieland	Maastrichtian	Pierre Shale	South Dakota	A species of Claosaurus	
Haplocanthosaurus	Gen. nov.	Nomen conservandum	Hatcher	Late Jurassic	Morrison Formation	Colorado	New name for "Haplocanthus", mistakenly thought preoccupied	
Haplocanthosaurus utterbacki	Sp. nov.	Jr. synonym	Hatcher	Late Jurassic	Morrison Formation	Colorado	A species of Haplocanthosaurus now a synonym of Haplocanthosaurus priscus	
Haplocanthus priscus	Gen. et sp. nov.	Nomen rejectum	Hatcher	Late Jurassic	Morrison Formation	Colorado	Erroneously thought preoccupied by Haplacanthus Agassiz, 1845 and renamed Haplocanthosaurus.	
Ornitholestes	Gen. et sp. nov.	Valid	Osborn	Kimmeridgian	Morrison Formation	Wyoming	Known from a single skull and partial skeleton.	
Telmatosaurus	Gen. nov.	Valid	Nopcsa	Maastrichtian	Sânpetru Formation	Romania	New genus name for Limnosaurus transsylvanicus	

== Sauropterygians ==
- Plesiosaur gastroliths documented.

=== Newly named plesiosaurs ===
Name	Novelty	Status	Authors	Age	Unit	Location	Notes	Images
Apatomerus	gen et sp	Valid	Williston	Albian	Kiowa Shale, Kansas		first described as a pterosaur; reidentified in the 1970s	
Brachauchenius	gen et sp	Valid	Williston	Turonian	Greenhorn Formation,	Colombia; UK; USA (Colorado, Kansas, Texas and Utah)	A brachauchenine pliosaurid.	Brachauchenius lucasi pursuing a generic hesperornithiform bird.
Dolichorhynchops	gen et sp	Valid	Williston	Turonian	Smoky Hill Chalk, Kansas	Canada (Manitoba, Northwest Territories and Saskatchewan); USA (Kansas, South Dakota, Texas, Utah and Wyoming)	A polycotylid.	

== Synapsids ==
=== Non-mammalian ===
Name	Novelty	Status	Authors	Age	Unit	Location	Notes	Images
Lycosuchus	gen et sp	Valid	Broom	Middle Permian	Middle Abrahamskraal Formation	South Africa		Lycosuchus
Scylacosaurus	gen et sp	Valid	Broom	Late Permian	Cistecephalus Assemblage Zone	South Africa		Scylacosaurus
Scymnosaurus	gen et sp	Valid	Broom	Middle Permian	Middle Abrahamskraal Formation	South Africa		

=== Eutherians ===
==== Cetaceans ====
Name	Novelty	Status	Authors	Age	Unit	Location	Notes	Images
Squalodon bariensis latirostris	Ssp. nov	Valid	Capellini	Late Oligocene (Chattian)	Unnamed deposit	Italy	A squalodontid; now recognized as a species of Eosqualodon.	

Pholidotes

Name	Authors	Age	Location	Notes	Images
Metacheiromys	Wortman	48 Million years ago.	USA (Colorado and Wyoming)	An Eocene Mammal related to modern pangolins.	Metacheiromys
