= 1899 in paleontology =

List of years in paleontology	(table)
- … 1889; 1890; 1891; 1892; 1893; 1894; 1895; 1896; 1897; 1898; 1899; 1900; 1901; 1902; 1903; 1904; 1905; 1906; 1907; 1908; 1909 …
- In science 1896 1897 1898 1899 1900 1901 1902
- Art; Archaeology; Architecture; Literature; Music; Philosophy; Science; +...

Paleontology or palaeontology is the study of prehistoric life forms on Earth through the examination of plant and animal fossils. This includes the study of body fossils, tracks (ichnites), burrows, cast-off parts, fossilised feces (coprolites), palynomorphs and chemical residues. Because humans have encountered fossils for millennia, paleontology has a long history both before and after becoming formalized as a science. This article records significant discoveries and events related to paleontology that occurred or were published in the year 1899.

== Anapsids ==
=== Turtles ===
Name	Novelty	Status	Authors	Age	Type locality	Location	Notes	Images
Acherontemys	Gen et sp nov	valid	Hay	Eocene; Lutetian	Roslyn Formation	US; Washington	A Pan-Emydidae pond turtle. The type species is A. heckmani.	Acherontemys heckmani
Hadrianus schucherti	Sp nov	Jr synonym	Hay	Eocene; Bartonian	Jackson Formation	US; Alabama	First described as a Hadrianus species. Moved to Cymatholcus schucherti (1950); Moved to Testudo schucherti (1964); Moved to Geochelone (Cymatholcus) schucherti (1986); Moved back to Cymatholcus schucherti (2018)	Cymatholcus schucherti

== Archosauromorphs ==
=== Newly named birds ===
Name	Novelty	Status	Authors	Age	Unit	Location	Notes	Images
Cruschedula	gen et sp nov	nomen dubium	Ameghino	Early Oligocene	Deseado Formation	Argentina	described as a penguin now Aves incertae sedis	

=== Newly named dinosaurs ===
Name	Novelty	Status	Authors	Age	Unit	Location	Notes	Images
Limnosaurus	gen et sp nov	Preoccupied.	Nopcsa	Maastrichtian	Sânpetru Formation	Romania	Preoccupied by Othniel Charles Marsh, 1872. Renamed Telmatosaurus.	
Mochlodon inkeyi	sp nov.	reassigned	Nopcsa	Maastrichtian	Sânpetru Formation	Austria	Reaasigned to Rhabdodon in 1915, then to Zalmoxes in 2003.	Illustrations of Z. robustus and Z. shqiperorum in scale
