= 1909 in paleontology =

List of years in paleontology	(table)
- … 1899; 1900; 1901; 1902; 1903; 1904; 1905; 1906; 1907; 1908; 1909; 1910; 1911; 1912; 1913; 1914; 1915; 1916; 1917; 1918; 1919 …
- In science 1906 1907 1908 1909 1910 1911 1912
- Art; Archaeology; Architecture; Literature; Music; Philosophy; Science; +...

Paleontology or palaeontology is the study of prehistoric life forms on Earth through the examination of plant and animal fossils. This includes the study of body fossils, tracks (ichnites), burrows, cast-off parts, fossilised feces (coprolites), palynomorphs and chemical residues. Because humans have encountered fossils for millennia, paleontology has a long history both before and after becoming formalized as a science. This article records significant discoveries and events related to paleontology that occurred or were published in the year 1909.

== Arthropods ==
=== Newly named insects ===
Name	Novelty	Status	Authors	Age	Unit	Location	Notes	Images
Etoptychoptera	Gen et sp nov	Valid	Handlirsch	Ypresian	Allenby Formation	Canada; British Columbia	An etoptychopterine phantom cranefly. Type species E. tertiaria.	Etoptychoptera tertiaria (1910 illustration)
Raphidia exhumata	Sp nov	jr synonym	Cockerell	Eocene; Priabonian	Florissant Formation	USA; Colorado	A raphidiid snakefly Moved to Megaraphidia exhumata in 2014	Megaraphidia exhumata
Protanyderus	Gen et sp nov	Valid	Handlirsch	Jurassic		Mongolia	A tanyderine phantom cranefly.	

== Archosauromorphs ==
=== Newly named dinosaurs ===
Data courtesy of George Olshevsky's dinosaur genera list.

Name	Status	Authors	Age	Unit	Location	Notes	Images
Hierosaurus	Valid taxon	Wieland	Late Cretaceous (Coniacian-Santonian)	Niobrara Formation	United States (Kansas)	A nodosaurid.	

== Plesiosaurs ==
=== New taxa ===
Name	Status	Authors	Age	Unit	Location	Notes	Images
Picrocleidus	Valid	Andrews	Callovian	Oxford Clay Formation	UK	A cryptoclidid.	
Simolestes	Valid	Andrews	Callovian	Oxford Clay Formation	France; India; UK	A thalassophonean pliosaurid.	Simolestes
Tricleidus	Valid	Andrews	Callovian	Oxford Clay Formation	Norway; UK	A cryptoclidid.	

== Synapsids ==
=== Non-mammalian ===
Name	Status	Authors	Age	Unit	Location	Notes	Images
Bauria	Valid	Robert Broom	Early Triassic	Cynognathus Assemblage Zone	South Africa	A bauriid theriodont.	Bauria

== People ==
- Death of Harry Govier Seeley, the paleontologist who invented the Saurischian/Ornithischian dinosaur dichotomy.
