= 1917 in paleontology =

List of years in paleontology	(table)
- … 1907; 1908; 1909; 1910; 1911; 1912; 1913; 1914; 1915; 1916; 1917; 1918; 1919; 1920; 1921; 1922; 1923; 1924; 1925; 1926; 1927 …
- In science 1914 1915 1916 1917 1918 1919 1920
- Art; Archaeology; Architecture; Literature; Music; Philosophy; Science; +...

Paleontology or palaeontology is the study of prehistoric life forms on Earth through the examination of plant and animal fossils. This includes the study of body fossils, tracks (ichnites), burrows, cast-off parts, fossilised feces (coprolites), palynomorphs and chemical residues. Because humans have encountered fossils for millennia, paleontology has a long history both before and after becoming formalized as a science. This article records significant discoveries and events related to paleontology that occurred or were published in the year 1917.

== Arthropods ==
=== Insects ===
Name	Novelty	Status	Authors	Age	Type locality	Location	Notes	Images
Tortrix? destructus	sp. nov	jr synonym	Cockerell	Priabonian	Florissant Formation	USA; Colorado	A moth, moved to Paleolepidopterites destructus (2018)	Paleolepidopterites destructus

== Vertebrates ==
=== Synapsids ===
Name	Novelty	Status	Authors	Age	Type locality	Location	Notes	Images
Myosaurus		Valid	Haughton	250 Millions years ago		Antarctica; South Africa		Myosaurus
Platycraniellus		Valid	Van Hoepen	250 Millions years ago		South Africa		
Prolystrosaurus		Valid	Haughton					

=== Avialans ===
Name	Novelty	Status	Authors	Age	Type locality	Location	Notes	Images
"Archaeornis"	Gen et comb nov	Junior synonym	Petronievics	Tithonian	Solnhofen limestone	Germany	Moved from Archaeopteryx siemensii (1897) refuted and retained in Archaeopteryx.	Archaeopteryx siemensii

=== Dinosaurs ===
Taxon	Novelty	Status	Author(s)	Age	Unit	Location	Notes	Images
Cheneosaurus	Gen. et sp. nov.	Jr. synonym	Lambe	Campanian	Horseshoe Canyon Formation	Alberta	Juvenile of Hypacrosaurus	
Edmontosaurus	Gen. et sp. nov.	Valid	Lambe	Campanian	Horseshoe Canyon Formation	Alberta	A hadrosaurid	
Struthiomimus	Subgen. nov.	Valid	Osborn	Campanian	Oldman Formation	Alberta	A new subgenus for Ornithomimus altus elevated in 1972	

== Literature ==
- Hunting Dinosaurs in the Badlands of the Red Deer River Valley, Alberta by C. H. Sternberg was published. Although the work was mostly non-fiction, it concluded with a series of fictional chapters wherein Sternberg dreamt of traveling back in time to the various ages of prehistory.
