= 1897 in paleontology =

List of years in paleontology	(table)
- … 1887; 1888; 1889; 1890; 1891; 1892; 1893; 1894; 1895; 1896; 1897; 1898; 1899; 1900; 1901; 1902; 1903; 1904; 1905; 1906; 1907 …
- In science 1894 1895 1896 1897 1898 1899 1900
- Art; Archaeology; Architecture; Literature; Music; Philosophy; Science; +...

Paleontology or palaeontology is the study of prehistoric life forms on Earth through the examination of plant and animal fossils. This includes the study of body fossils, tracks (ichnites), burrows, cast-off parts, fossilised feces (coprolites), palynomorphs and chemical residues. Because humans have encountered fossils for millennia, paleontology has a long history both before and after becoming formalized as a science. This article records significant discoveries and events related to paleontology that occurred or were published in the year 1897.

== Arthropods ==
=== Crustaceans ===
==== New taxa ====
Name	Novelty	Status	Authors	Age	Unit	Location	Notes	Images
Crangopsis vermiformis	Comb. nov.	Jr. synonym	Ortmann	Carboniferous		USA; Kentucky	Junior synonym of Archaeocaris vermiformis	

== Dinosaurs ==
Name	Status	Authors	Notes
"Euacanthus"	Nomen nudum	Sir Richard Owen vide Tennyson	If properly described, it would have become a junior objective synonym of Polacanthus.
