= 1895 in paleontology =

List of years in paleontology	(table)
- … 1885; 1886; 1887; 1888; 1889; 1890; 1891; 1892; 1893; 1894; 1895; 1896; 1897; 1898; 1899; 1900; 1901; 1902; 1903; 1904; 1905 …
- In science 1892 1893 1894 1895 1896 1897 1898
- Art; Archaeology; Architecture; Literature; Music; Philosophy; Science; +...

Paleontology or palaeontology is the study of prehistoric life forms on Earth through the examination of plant and animal fossils. This includes the study of body fossils, tracks (ichnites), burrows, cast-off parts, fossilised feces (coprolites), palynomorphs and chemical residues. Because humans have encountered fossils for millennia, paleontology has a long history both before and after becoming formalized as a science. This article records significant discoveries and events related to paleontology that occurred or were published in the year 1895.

== Insects ==
Name	Novelty	Status	Authors	Age	Type locality	Location	Notes	Images
Cercopis grandescens	Sp nov	Valid	Scudder	Ypresian	Allenby Formation	Canada; British Columbia	A froghopper	Cercopis grandescens (1895 illustration)
Cercopites torpescens	Sp nov	Valid	Scudder	Ypresian	Allenby Formation	Canada; British Columbia	A froghopper	Cercopites torpescens (1895 illustration)
Dawsonites	Gen et sp nov	Valid	Scudder	Ypresian	Allenby Formation	Canada; British Columbia	A froghopper Type species D. veter	Dawsonites veter (1895 illustration)
Cryptocephalites	gen et sp nov	Valid	Scudder	Ypresian	Allenby Formation	Canada; British Columbia	A chrysomelid leaf beetle. Type species C. punctatus	Cryptocephalites punctatus
Limonius impunctus	Sp nov	Valid	Scudder	Ypresian	Allenby Formation	Canada; British Columbia	An elaterid click beetle.	Limonius impunctus
Palaeoptysma	Gen et sp nov	Valid	Scudder	Ypresian	Allenby Formation	Canada; British Columbia	A spittle bug Type species P. venosa	Palaeoptysma venosa (1895 illustration)
Ptysmaphora	Gen et sp nov	Valid	Scudder	Ypresian	Allenby Formation	Canada; British Columbia	A spittle bug Type species P. fletcheri	Ptysmaphora fletcheri (1895 illustration)
Ricania antiquata	Sp nov	jr synonym	Scudder	Ypresian	Allenby Formation	Canada; British Columbia	A Polystoechotid-group moth lacewing Moved to Ricaniella antiquata (1897)	Ricaniella antiquata (1895 illustration)
Stenecphora	Gen et sp nov	Valid	Scudder	Ypresian	Allenby Formation	Canada; British Columbia	A froghopper Type species S. punctulata	Stenecphora punctulata (1895 illustration)
Stenolocris	Gen et sp nov	Valid	Scudder	Ypresian	Allenby Formation	Canada; British Columbia	A froghopper Type species S. venosa	Stenolocris venosa (1895 illustration)

== Synapsids ==
=== Non-mammalian ===
Name	Status	Authors	Age	Location	Notes	Images
Cryptocynodon	Valid	Seeley	Late Permian	South Africa		
Cynognathus	Valid	Seeley	Middle Triassic	South Africa		Cynognathus
Diademodon	Valid	Seeley	Middle Triassic	South Africa	A Cynodont.	Diademodon
Esoterodon	Valid	Seeley		Tanzania		
Gomphognathus	Valid	Seeley				
Microgomphodon	Valid	Seeley		South Africa		
Pristerognathus	Valid	Seeley		South Africa	A Therocephalian	
Trirachodon	Valid	Seeley		Namibia; South Africa; Zambia		Trirachodon

== Birds ==
Name	Novelty	Status	Authors	Age	Location	Notes	Images
Thegornis	Gen. et 2 sp. nov	Valid	Ameghino	Early–Middle Miocene (Santacrucian)	Argentina	A member of the Herpetotherinae. The type species is T. musculosus; Ameghino also named T. debilis, but it has since been synonymized with the former on the basis of sexual dimorphism.	
