= 1892 in paleontology =

List of years in paleontology	(table)
- … 1882; 1883; 1884; 1885; 1886; 1887; 1888; 1889; 1890; 1891; 1892; 1893; 1894; 1895; 1896; 1897; 1898; 1899; 1900; 1901; 1902 …
- In science 1889 1890 1891 1892 1893 1894 1895
- Art; Archaeology; Architecture; Literature; Music; Philosophy; Science; +...

Paleontology or palaeontology is the study of prehistoric life forms on Earth through the examination of plant and animal fossils. This includes the study of body fossils, tracks (ichnites), burrows, cast-off parts, fossilised feces (coprolites), palynomorphs and chemical residues. Because humans have encountered fossils for millennia, paleontology has a long history both before and after becoming formalized as a science. This article records significant discoveries and events related to paleontology that occurred or were published in the year 1892.

== Mollusca ==
=== Newly named bivalves ===
Name	Novelty	Status	Authors	Age	Unit	Location	Notes	Images
Tellinomya similis.	Sp nov	synonym	Ulrich	Ashgillian	Upper Richmond Group, Minnesota	USA	transferred to Similodonta in 1964	
Tellinomya recurva.	Sp nov	synonym	Lamont	Ashgillian	Upper Richmond Group, Minnesota	USA	transferred to Similodonta in 1964	

== Dinosaurs ==
=== New taxa ===
Taxon	Novelty	Status	Author(s)	Age	Unit	Location	Notes	Images
Claosaurus annectens	Sp. nov.	Valid	Marsh	Maastrichtian	Laramie Formation	Wyoming	A new species of Claosaurus later named Edmontosaurus annectens	
Claorhynchus trihedrus	Gen. et sp. nov.	Nomen dubium	Cope	Maastrichtian	Laramie Formation	Wyoming	Possible synonym of Triceratops	
Iguanodon hilli	Sp. nov.	Nomen dubium	Newton	Cenomanian	Hertfordshire	England	A species of Iguanodon	
Manospondylus gigas	Gen. et sp. nov.	Nomen dubium	Cope	Maastrichtian	Laramie Formation	Wyoming	Possible subjective synonym of Tyrannosaurus	
Ornithomimus sedens	Sp. nov.	Valid	Marsh	Maastrichtian	Laramie Formation	Wyoming	A species of Ornithomimus	

== Plesiosaurs ==
=== New taxa ===
Name	Status	Authors	Notes
Cryptocleidus	Valid	Seeley	

== Synapsids ==
=== Non-mammalian ===
Name	Status	Authors	Discovery year	Age	Unit	Location	Notes	Images
Delphinognathus	Valid	Seeley						
Diopaeus								
Geikia	Valid	Newton						
