= 1918 in paleontology =

List of years in paleontology	(table)
- … 1908; 1909; 1910; 1911; 1912; 1913; 1914; 1915; 1916; 1917; 1918; 1919; 1920; 1921; 1922; 1923; 1924; 1925; 1926; 1927; 1928 …
- In science 1915 1916 1917 1918 1919 1920 1921
- Art; Archaeology; Architecture; Literature; Music; Philosophy; Science; +...

Paleontology or palaeontology is the study of prehistoric life forms on Earth through the examination of plant and animal fossils. This includes the study of body fossils, tracks (ichnites), burrows, cast-off parts, fossilised feces (coprolites), palynomorphs and chemical residues. Because humans have encountered fossils for millennia, paleontology has a long history both before and after becoming formalized as a science. This article records significant discoveries and events related to paleontology that occurred or were published in the year 1918.

== Synapsids ==
Taxon	Novelty	Status	Author(s)	Age	Unit	Location	Notes	Images
Akidnognathus		Valid	Haughton			South Africa	A therocephalian	
Whaitsia		Jr. synonym	Haughton	Wuchiapingian	Beaufort Group	South Africa	A therocephalian	

== Dinosaurs ==
Taxon	Novelty	Status	Author(s)	Age	Unit	Location	Notes	Images
Leipsanosaurus	Gen. et sp. nov.	Nomen dubium	Nopcsa	Campanian	Gosau Group	Austria	Possible junior synonym of Struthiosaurus	
Notoceratops	Gen. et sp. nov.	Nomen dubium.	Tapia	Campanian	Pehunche Formation	Argentina	Originally classified as a ceratopsian	
