= Eustace L. Furlong =

American paleontologist (1874-1950)

Eustace Leopold Furlong (1874-1950) was a paleontologist and fossil preparator noted for his work on ancient mammals and the Mesozoic reptiles of California.

The plesiosaur Aphrosaurus furlongi was named after Furlong by Samuel Welles.

== Professional Life ==
In 1900 Furlong began attending the University of California at Berkeley. The next year he began preparing vertebrate fossils for Berkeley paleontologist John C. Merriam. In 1902 and 1903 Furlong participated into several fossil hunting expeditions to Shasta County. On these expeditions Furlong collected alongside Annie Montague Alexander. Although Furlong found several of their combined 43 fossil specimen discoveries, only one has been formally credited solely to him. Furlong did the preparation work on most of the fossils uncovered by the Shasta County expeditions. His preparation work lasted until May, 1910. In 1913 he resumed working with Berkeley's paleontologists. Furlong associated closely with Chester Stock when the latter joined Berkeley in 1919. Furlong went on to perform research into ancient mammals. He became involved in Mesozoic reptile work once more during the late 1930s and early 1940s due to Chester Stock's expeditions into the Panoche Hills during this time. Furlong made significant contributions to those collections, prepared dozens of vertebrate fossil specimens, and did extensive cataloging of the museum's early collections. He also helped save the fossils from destruction.

Eustace became a preparator and field worker for Merriam after his brother Herbert vacated the position. Eustace was a member of Sigma Xi and graduated from Berkeley in 1906. He stayed on at Berkeley as a Geological Assistant (this was before there was a Department of Paleontology). Like his brother, Eustace made trips to the John Day and to Shasta County helping to collect specimens. He accompanied Annie Alexander on a number of field trips.

The March 25, 1905, issue of the Oakland Tribune mentions Eustance Furlong's assistance in a fire on the Berkeley campus:

FIRE THREATENS SOUTH HALL

University Building at Berkeley Has Narrow Escape from Flames

Only the timely discovery of Richard Rowe, a janitor at the University of California, prevented the destruction by fire this morning of historic South Hall, one of the oldest and largest buildings at the State University.

Aided by Eustace Furlong, an instructor in the Department of Anthropology [poor reporting], he fought the flames, which started on the third floor, with buckets of water placed in the hall for just such emergencies.

For a time it seemed as if the flames would get beyond their control, and an alarm was turned in, to which the University fire department responded. Rowe and Furlong, with their buckets, however, quenched the flames and the services of the firemen were not needed.

The building is valued at about $50,000, but on the third and second floors all the specimens and valuable finds of Professor Merriam, which are of priceless value to science, are stored. These finds, which represent the latest and most important work in anthropology [sigh] in America, could never have been replaced had the fire once swept through the building.

The fire started from crossed electric wires in the dark room of Professor Merriam's department. Janitor Rowe was at work in the department when the flames burst forth. He at once gave the alarm and began to fight the fire with the fire buckets. Furlong came to his aid and the fire was put out. The damage is nominal.

The entire fossil collection that had been amassed by Joseph Le Conte and Merriam up to that time could have been completely destroyed if not for Furlong and an alert janitor.

By 1910, Furlong had published six papers, five of them on the Pleistocene cave fauna. Furlong left the museum in 1910 to pursue a career in real estate. He returned to his assistant position at the museum in 1914.

In 1921, the year that Alexander made an endowment for the creation of a Museum of Paleontology at Berkeley, Furlong was made curator of the vertebrate collections at Alexander's recommendation. Furlong served in that capacity until 1927 when he was lured away to the California Institute of Technology in Pasadena by Chester Stock and John Buwalda, both former students and collaborators of Merriam's (Merriam had left Berkeley for the Carnegie Institute in Washington, DC, just prior to the creation of the museum). Furlong remained at Caltech as a faculty member and curator of paleontology until his retirement in 1945. He published 11 more papers at Caltech, some co-authored with Stock.

In 1945, Furlong was invited up to the University of Oregon to prepare and study fossil mammals collected in the John Day Basin. While there he was severely injured when a car hit him and from that point on he was unable to walk unaided. Eustace died in Davis on January 18, 1950, and is buried in Woodland Cemetery, Woodland, California.

== Personal Life ==
Eustace Leopold Furlong was born in San Francisco, one of at least three children, in 1874. His father, Matthew William Furlong of Rhode Island, was a sea captain who came to California seeking his fortune in the gold fields. Eustace attended San Francisco public schools and prior to enrolling at UC Berkeley, spent a considerable amount of time mining in the Sierra Nevada (probably with his father).

Although the vertebrate paleontologists at UCMP are familiar with Eustace, few realize that his older brother by two years, Herbert W. Furlong, was a preparator and field worker for John C. Merriam before Eustace. As a student at Berkeley, Herbert accompanied Merriam on two trips to the John Day region of Oregon and led a successful expedition to Crater Lake in Shasta County. According to an August 3, 1905, article in the Oakland Tribune, Herbert even authored a book called Story in the Sand that was "being used throughout the United States as a text book". Unlike Eustace, Herbert did not catch the paleontology bug and pursued other interests following his graduation from Berkeley in 1903.

On September 2nd 1905, the Oakland Tribune published an article on his marriage to Ida Hopper in Jackson, California, (apparently he had told no one about it) but it also describes some of his paleontology work. Here is a portion of the article:

PROFESSOR STEALS A MARCH

Takes a Bride and Gives Berkeley a Surprise

Mr. Furlong is assistant to Professor John C. Merriam of the Berkeley seat of learning. His specialty is paleontology, and his original researches in this line have resulted in discoveries of great interest to the scientific world.

Mr. Furlong has conducted extensive investigations in the Potter Cave regions of Shasta county and has discovered the names of many cave animals, which are much like in character to the human life of ancient times. [sic]

Mr. Furlong's investigations have also been conducted in the lime-stone [sic] formation of the Sierra Nevada region, and in Nevada particularly, where he has worked with Professor Merriam in finding fossils that are considered of extraordinary value in the field of paleontology.

This summer Mr. Furlong was again assigned to work in the Shasta regions, but before beginning his scientific researches he stopped at Ione to claim his promised bride.

After the ceremony, Furlong took his new wife to Shasta County for a somewhat unconventional honeymoon: she watched as Eustace busied himself with his field work. Ida remained with Eustace until his death and provided him with two daughters. The wedding and Shasta County work took place just a few months after Furlong returned from the Saurian Expedition. During his second tenure at Berkeley, Furlong and his wife lived at 1031 Glendora Avenue in Oakland.

In 1945 Furlong retired and moved to Eugene, Oregon. That same year he was hit by a car. Furlong survived but suffered health complications related to the accident for the rest of his life. Despite retirement and the accident, Furlong continued to contribute to vertebrate paleontology. He died in 1950.
