= 1919 in paleontology =

List of years in paleontology	(table)
- … 1909; 1910; 1911; 1912; 1913; 1914; 1915; 1916; 1917; 1918; 1919; 1920; 1921; 1922; 1923; 1924; 1925; 1926; 1927; 1928; 1929 …
- In science 1916 1917 1918 1919 1920 1921 1922
- Art; Archaeology; Architecture; Literature; Music; Philosophy; Science; +...

Paleontology or palaeontology is the study of prehistoric life forms on Earth through the examination of plant and animal fossils. This includes the study of body fossils, tracks (ichnites), burrows, cast-off parts, fossilised feces (coprolites), palynomorphs and chemical residues. Because humans have encountered fossils for millennia, paleontology has a long history both before and after becoming formalized as a science. This article records significant discoveries and events related to paleontology that occurred or were published in the year 1919.

== Expeditions, field work, and fossil discoveries ==
- Summer: William Edmund Cutler resumed collecting dinosaur fossils in Dinosaur Provincial Park. One discovery was a disarticulated ceratopsian he identified as an "Eoceratops". He spent the remainder of the year excavating the specimen although his progress was hampered by illness and bad weather.

== Vertebrate paleontology ==
=== Newly named dinosaurs ===
Data courtesy of George Olshevsky's dinosaur genera list.

Name	Status	Authors	Age	Unit	Location	Notes	Images
Dysalotosaurus	Valid taxon.	Virchow	late Kimmeridgian-Tithonian	Tendaguru Formation	Tanzania	A dryosaurid.	Dysalotosaurus
Panoplosaurus	Valid taxon	Lawrence Lambe	middle-late Campanian	Dinosaur Park Formation	Canada (Alberta)	A nodosaurid	Panoplosaurus
Uintasaurus	Junior synonym.	Holland	late Kimmeridgian-Tithonian	Morrison Formation		Junior synonym of Camarasaurus.	

=== Newly named pterosaurs ===
Name	Status	Authors	Age	Unit	Location	Notes
Parapsicephalus	Valid	von Arthaber	Toarcian	Whitby Limestone Formation	UK	A rhamphorhynchid; new genus for "Scaphognathus" purdoni Newton (1888).
