= 1921 in paleontology =

List of years in paleontology	(table)
- … 1911; 1912; 1913; 1914; 1915; 1916; 1917; 1918; 1919; 1920; 1921; 1922; 1923; 1924; 1925; 1926; 1927; 1928; 1929; 1930; 1931 …
- In science 1918 1919 1920 1921 1922 1923 1924
- Art; Archaeology; Architecture; Literature; Music; Philosophy; Science; +...

Paleontology or palaeontology is the study of prehistoric life forms on Earth through the examination of plant and animal fossils. This includes the study of body fossils, tracks (ichnites), burrows, cast-off parts, fossilised feces (coprolites), palynomorphs and chemical residues. Because humans have encountered fossils for millennia, paleontology has a long history both before and after becoming formalized as a science. This article records significant discoveries and events related to paleontology that occurred or were published in the year 1921.

== Plants ==
=== Newly named angiosperms ===
Name	Novelty	Status	Authors	Age	Type locality	Location	Notes	Images
Porana sikhote-alinensis	Sp nov	jr synonym	Kryshtofovich	Miocene	Amgu flora	Russia; Primorsky Krai	A mallow relative, jr synonym of Florissantia sikhote-alinensis (1992)	

== Arthropods ==
=== Newly named insects ===
Name	Novelty	Status	Authors	Age	Unit	Location	Notes	Images
Eoformica	Gen et sp nov	valid	Cockerell	Eocene	Green River Formation	USA; Colorado	An incertae sedis ant genus, type species E. eocenica (a jr synonym to Eoformica pinguis (Scudder, 1877) in 1930)	Eoformica pinguis

== Dinosaurs ==
=== Newly named dinosaurs ===
Data courtesy of George Olshevsky's dinosaur genera list.

Name	Novelty	Status	Authors	Age	Unit	Location	Notes	Images
Sarcosaurus	Gen et sp nov	Valid	Andrews	Hettangian-Sinemurian	Blue Lias	England	A ceratosaurid	Sarcosaurus

== Synapsids ==
=== Non-mammalian ===
Name	Status	Authors	Age	Unit	Location	Notes	Images
Anteosaurus	Valid	Watson	Middle Permian	Tapinocephalus Assemblage Zone	South Africa	A member of Dinocephalia.	
Emyduranus	Junior synonym	Broom	Late Permian	Cistecephalus Assemblage Zone	South Africa	A junior synonym of Pristerodon.	
Leptotrachelus	Junior synonym	Broom	Middle Permian	Tapinocephalus Assemblage Zone	South Africa	Junior synonym of Gorgonops	
Palemydops	Valid	Broom	Late Permian	Cistecephalus Assemblage Zone	South Africa	A dicynodont.	
