= 1924 in paleontology =

List of years in paleontology	(table)
- … 1914; 1915; 1916; 1917; 1918; 1919; 1920; 1921; 1922; 1923; 1924; 1925; 1926; 1927; 1928; 1929; 1930; 1931; 1932; 1933; 1934 …
- In science 1921 1922 1923 1924 1925 1926 1927
- Art; Archaeology; Architecture; Literature; Music; Philosophy; Science; +...

Paleontology or palaeontology is the study of prehistoric life forms on Earth through the examination of plant and animal fossils. This includes the study of body fossils, tracks (ichnites), burrows, cast-off parts, fossilised feces (coprolites), palynomorphs and chemical residues. Because humans have encountered fossils for millennia, paleontology has a long history both before and after becoming formalized as a science. This article records significant discoveries and events related to paleontology that occurred or were published in the year 1924.

== Dinosaurs ==
=== New taxa ===
Taxon	Novelty	Status	Author(s)	Age	Unit	Location	Notes	Images
Asiatosaurus mongoliensis	Gen. et sp. nov.	Nomen dubium	Osborn	Early Cretaceous	Öösh Formation	Mongolia	An indeterminate sauropod	
Chirostenotes pergracilis	Gen. et sp. nov.	Valid	Gilmore	Campanian	Dinosaur Park Formation	Alberta	An oviraptorosaur	
Dyoplosaurus acutosquameus	Gen. et sp. nov.	Valid	William Parks	Campanian	Dinosaur Park Formation	Alberta	An ankylosaurid	
Euskelesaurus africanus	Sp. nov.	Nomen dubium	Haughton	Norian	Elliot Formation	South Africa	A species of the prosauropod Euskelosaurus (often misspelled Euskelesaurus)	
"Fenestrosaurus philoceratops"		Nomen nudum	Henry Fairfield Osborn	Campanian	Djadochta Formation	Mongolia	Named Oviraptor	
Gryponyx taylori	Sp. nov.	Nomen dubium	Haughton	Hettangian-Sinemurian	Elliot Formation	South Africa	A species of the prosauropod Gryponyx	
Kritosaurus marginatus	Nov. comb.	Nomen dubium	Gilmore	Campanian	Dinosaur Park Formation	Alberta	A reassignment of Stephanosaurus marginatus to Kritosaurus	
Lycorhinus angustidens	Gen. et sp. nov.	Valid	Haughton	Hettangian-Sinemurian	Elliot Formation	South Africa	A heterodontosaurid	
Massospondylus schwarzi	Sp. nov.	Nomen dubium	Haughton	Hettangian-Sinemurian	Elliot Formation	South Africa	A species of the prosauropod Massospondylus	
Melanorosaurus readi	Gen. et sp. nov.	Valid	Haughton	Norian-Rhaetian	Elliot Formation	South Africa	A melanorosaurid prosauropod	
"Ornithoides oshiensis"		Nomen nudum	Osborn	Campanian	Djadochta Formation	Mongolia	Named Saurornithoides	
Oviraptor philoceratops	Gen. et sp. nov.	Valid	Osborn	Campanian	Djadochta Formation	Mongolia	An oviraptorid	
"Ovoraptor djadochtari"		Nomen nudum	Osborn	Campanian	Djadochta Formation	Mongolia	Named Velociraptor	
Plateosaurus cullingworthi	Sp. nov.	Valid	Haughton	Norian	Elliot Formation	South Africa	Later given the genus name Plateosauravus	
Prodeinodon mongoliensis	Gen. et sp. nov.	Nomen dubium	Osborn	Early Cretaceous	Öösh Formation	Mongolia	An indeterminate theropod	
Saurornithoides mongoliensis	Gen. et sp. nov.	Valid	Osborn	Campanian	Djadochta Formation	Mongolia	A troodontid	
Thecodontosaurus dubius	Sp. nov.	Nomen dubium	Haughton	Hettangian-Sinemurian	Elliot Formation	South Africa	A species of the prosauropod Thecodontosaurus	
Thespesius edmontoni	Sp. nov.	Jr. synonym	Gilmore	Maastrichtian	Horseshoe Canyon Formation	Alberta	A new species of Thespesius, now a synonym of Edmontosaurus regalis	
Velociraptor mongoliensis	Gen. et sp. nov.	Valid	Osborn	Campanian	Djadochta Formation	Mongolia	A velociraptorine dromaeosaurid	

== Synapsids ==
=== Newly named mammals ===
Name	Novelty	Status	Authors	Age	Unit	Location	Notes	Images
Amphicticeps	Gen et sp nov	Valid	Matthew & Granger	Oligocene	Hsanda Gol Formation	Mongolia	An amphicynodont, type species is A. shackelfordi	
Andrewsarchus	Gen et sp nov	Valid	Henry Fairfield Osborn	middle Eocene	Irdin Manha Formation	China	A cetancodontamorph originally thought to be a mesonychian.	Andrewsarchus
Bunaelurus parvulus	Sp nov	jr synonym	Matthew & Granger	Oligocene	Hsanda Gol Formation	Mongolia	Junior synonym of Palaeogale sectoria	
Bunaelurus ulysses	Sp nov	jr synonym	Matthew & Granger	Oligocene	Hsanda Gol Formation	Mongolia	Junior synonym of Palaeogale sectoria	
Cynodictis elegans	Sp nov	Valid	Matthew & Granger	Oligocene	Hsanda Gol Formation	Mongolia	An amphicyonid	
Cynodon (Pachycynodon) teilhardi	Sp nov	jr synonym	Matthew & Granger	Oligocene	Hsanda Gol Formation	Mongolia	An amphicynodont, moved to Amphicynodon teilhardi	
Didymoconus	Gen et sp nov	Valid	Matthew & Granger	Oligocene	Hsanda Gol Formation	Mongolia	A didymoconid, includes the species D. colgatei & D. berkeyi	
Hyaenodon pervagus	Sp nov	Valid	Matthew & Granger	Oligocene	Hsanda Gol Formation	Mongolia	A hyaenodont	
Palaeoprionodon gracilis	Jr synonym	Valid	Matthew & Granger	Oligocene	Hsanda Gol Formation	Mongolia	Moved to the genus Asiavorator.	
Paracynohyaenodon morrisi	Sp nov	jr synonym	Matthew & Granger	Oligocene	Irdin Manha Formation	China	A hyaenodont, moved to Propterodon morrisi in 1993	
Viverravus constans	Sp nov	jr synonym	Matthew & Granger	Oligocene	Hsanda Gol Formation	Mongolia	A carnivoran, moved to Shandgolictis constans	
