= 1927 in paleontology =

List of years in paleontology	(table)
- … 1917; 1918; 1919; 1920; 1921; 1922; 1923; 1924; 1925; 1926; 1927; 1928; 1929; 1930; 1931; 1932; 1933; 1934; 1935; 1936; 1937 …
- In science 1924 1925 1926 1927 1928 1929 1930
- Art; Archaeology; Architecture; Literature; Music; Philosophy; Science; +...

Paleontology or palaeontology is the study of prehistoric life forms on Earth through the examination of plant and animal fossils. This includes the study of body fossils, tracks (ichnites), burrows, cast-off parts, fossilised feces (coprolites), palynomorphs and chemical residues. Because humans have encountered fossils for millennia, paleontology has a long history both before and after becoming formalized as a science. This article records significant discoveries and events related to paleontology that occurred or were published in the year 1927.

== Mollusks ==
=== Gastropods ===
Name	Novelty	Status	Authors	Age	Unit	Location	Notes	Images
Condonella	Gen et sp nov	Valid	McLellan	Campanian	Cedar District Formation		A Urocoptid land snail	

== Archosauromorphs ==
=== Newly named dinosaurs ===
Data courtesy of George Olshevsky's dinosaur genera list.

Name	Novelty	Status	Authors	Age	Unit	Location	Notes	Images
Cetiosauriscus	Gen. nov.	Valid	Huene	Middle Jurassic (Callovian)	Oxford Clay Formation	Cambridgeshire, UK	A non-neosauropod eusauropod known from a forelimb and rear half of a skeleton. The type species is Cetiosauriscus stewarti.	

=== Newly named birds ===
Name	Novelty	Status	Authors	Age	Unit	Location	Notes	Images
Phasmagyps	Gen et sp nov	Valid	Wetmore	Chadronian	Chadron Formation	USA (Colorado)	A New World vulture.	

== Synapsids ==
=== Non-mammalian ===
Name	Novelty	Status	Authors	Age	Unit	Location	Notes	Images
Anningia	Gen et sp nov	Nomen dubium	Broom	Middle Permian			A member of Varanopidae.	
Cynosaurus	Gen et sp nov	Valid	Schmidt	Late Permian	Dicynodon Assemblage Zone	South Africa	A member of Galesauridae.	
Permocynodon	Gen et sp nov	Junior synonym	Sushkin	Late Permian	Vyatkian Horizon		A junior synonym of Dvinia.	

=== Mammals ===
Name	Authors	Age	Location	Notes	Images
Alphadon	Simpson	70 Million years ago	Algeria; Canada (Alberta and Saskatchewan); Portugal; USA (Montana, New Mexico, North Dakota, South Dakota, Texas, Utah and Wyoming); China	A Cretaceous Marsupial.	Alphadon

==== Cetaceans ====
Name	Novelty	Status	Authors	Age	Unit	Location	Notes	Images
Aulophyseter	Gen. et sp. nov	Valid	Kellogg	Middle Miocene (Langhian)	Temblor Formation	US (California)	A close relative of the sperm whale.	
Stenodelphis sternbergi	Sp. nov	Valid	Gregory & Kellogg	Late Pliocene (Piacenzian)	San Diego Formation	US (California	A close relative of the baiji; now referred to Parapontoporia	
