= 17th century in paleontology =

Paleontology or palaeontology is the study of prehistoric life forms on Earth through the examination of plant and animal fossils. This includes the study of body fossils, tracks (ichnites), burrows, cast-off parts, fossilised feces (coprolites), palynomorphs and chemical residues. Because humans have encountered fossils for millennia, paleontology has a long history both before and after becoming formalized as a science. This article records significant discoveries and events related to paleontology that occurred or were published in the 17th century.

== 1665 ==
- Athanasius Kircher in Mundus Subterraneus (publication of which begins in Amsterdam) describes giant bones as those belonging to extinct races of humans.

== 1671 ==
- Martin Lister, a member of London's Royal Society declares that despite their appearances, fossils were never part of any animals.

== 1677 ==
- Robert Plot misinterprets a piece of Megalosaurus thigh bone as belonging to a war elephant brought to Britain when the region was under the control of the Roman Empire. Despite recognizing this find as a petrified bone, he would later make the curious claim that fossils were made by God to decorate the inside of the Earth, and were thus never part of real animals.

== 1696 ==
- Robert Plot, the first illustrator of a dinosaur bone, dies in Borden, Kent, the village where he was born.

== 1699 ==
- Edward Lhuyd, a Welsh naturalist, speculates that fossils form when the minute spawn of oceanic life is carried inland by air currents and is forced to germinate inside of rocks. He also names Rutellum, a specimen now recognized as a Cetiosaurid Sauropod Dinosaur.
