= 1817 in paleontology =

Paleontology or palaeontology is the study of prehistoric life forms on Earth through the examination of plant and animal fossils. This includes the study of body fossils, tracks (ichnites), burrows, cast-off parts, fossilised feces (coprolites), palynomorphs and chemical residues. Because humans have encountered fossils for millennia, paleontology has a long history both before and after becoming formalized as a science. This article records significant discoveries and events related to paleontology that occurred or were published in the year 1817.

== Pterosaurs ==
- Soemmering reported the discovery of a second pterosaur specimen. This second specimen was smaller than the first, with a 25 cm wingspan, and possessed a shorter snout. These traits mislead Soemmering into greater confidence in his interpretation of pterosaurs as bats. This specimen reminded him of the parti-colored bat. He named this fossil Ornithocephalus brevirostris.

=== New taxa ===
Taxon	Novelty	Status	Author(s)	Age	Unit	Location	Notes	Images
Ornithocephalus brevirostris	Sp. nov.	Questionable	von Sömmerring	Tithonian	Solnhofen limestone	Germany	Juvenile possibly referrable to Ctenochasma	
