= 1821 in paleontology =

Paleontology or palaeontology is the study of prehistoric life forms on Earth through the examination of plant and animal fossils. This includes the study of body fossils, tracks (ichnites), burrows, cast-off parts, fossilised feces (coprolites), palynomorphs and chemical residues. Because humans have encountered fossils for millennia, paleontology has a long history both before and after becoming formalized as a science. This article records significant discoveries and events related to paleontology that occurred or were published in the year 1821.

== Dinosaurs ==
- On 21 June, Gideon Algernon Mantell displays the fossils he would later name Iguanodon to the Geological Society, but arouses little interest.

== Plesiosaurs ==
=== New taxa ===
Taxon	Novelty	Status	Author(s)	Age	Unit	Location	Notes	Images
Plesiosaurus	Gen. nov.	Valid	De la Beche & Conybeare	Sinemurian	Blue Lias	England	Conybeare named the genus in Plesiosaurus 1821 without designating a type species. The genus was named on the basis of a complete skeleton discovered by Mary Anning.	
