= 1819 in paleontology =

Paleontology or palaeontology is the study of prehistoric life forms on Earth through the examination of plant and animal fossils. This includes the study of body fossils, tracks (ichnites), burrows, cast-off parts, fossilised feces (coprolites), palynomorphs and chemical residues. Because humans have encountered fossils for millennia, paleontology has a long history both before and after becoming formalized as a science. This article records significant discoveries and events related to paleontology that occurred or were published in the year 1819.

== Pterosaurs ==
=== New taxa ===
Taxon	Novelty	Status	Author(s)	Age	Unit	Location	Notes	Images
Pterodactylus longirostris	Sp. nov.	Jr. synonym	Cuvier	Tithonian	Solnhofen limestone	Germany	Junior objective synonym of Ornithocephalus antiquus (now Pterodactylus)	
