= Flukeprint =

Patch of calm water on the surface of the ocean, formed by the passing of a whale

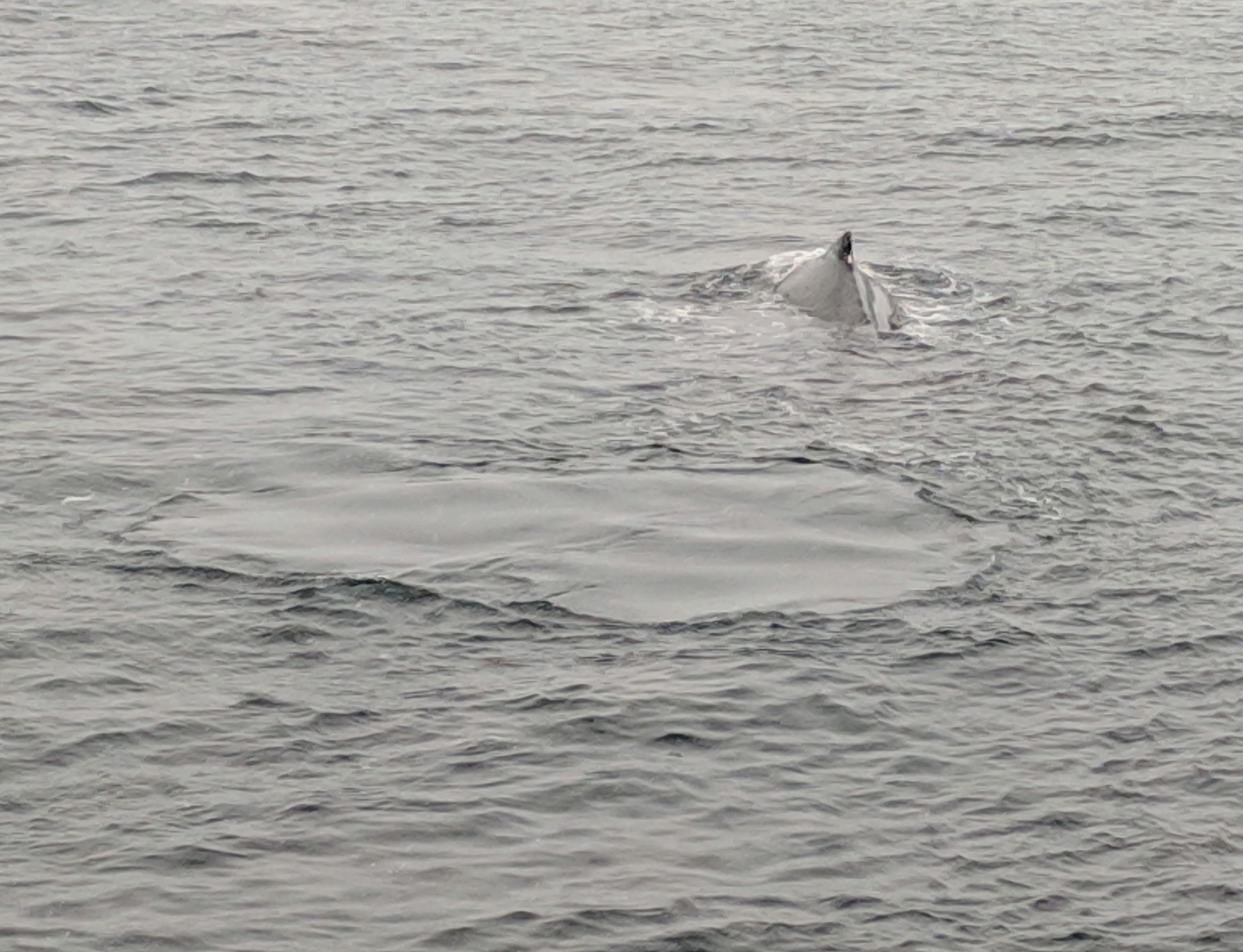
A flukeprint is clearly visible behind a humpback whale.

In marine biology, a flukeprint is a patch of calm water on the surface of the ocean, formed by the passing of a whale. Flukeprints may also be named by the word for them in the Inupiaq language, qala.

As with other forms of animal tracks, flukeprints may be used in hunting, to follow whales that are invisible beneath the ocean surface, and to determine the size of an unseen whale. They have also been used for similar purposes by scientists studying whales.

Fluid dynamics researchers have proposed multiple mechanisms for the formation of flukeprints, including vortex shedding from the fluke of the whale, the action of surfactants on the surface of the water, and shear flow in the interaction between water waves and the current caused by the passing whale.
