= Apatomerus =

Apatomerus Temporal range: Early Cretaceous, Albian

Scientific classification
- Domain: Eukaryota
- Kingdom: Animalia
- Phylum: Chordata
- Class: Reptilia
- Genus: †Apatomerus; Williston, 1903

Type species
- †Apatomerus mirus Williston, 1903

Extinct genus of reptiles

Apatomerus (meaning "deceptive femur"), is a genus of extinct reptile known from a single fossil (KUVP 1199) from the Albian-age (Lower Cretaceous) Kiowa Shale of Kansas, USA. This bone, collected in 1893, was first identified as the thighbone of a crocodilian, but was described in 1903 by Samuel Wendell Williston as belonging to a pterosaur. This identification held through the 1970s, but has been abandoned. Recent summaries of pterosaur genera, such as Wellnhofer, 1991 and Glut, 2004 did not include it, and Mike Everhart, an authority on the rocks of the Western Interior Seaway (including the Kiowa Shale) identifies the bone as more likely the upper part of a plesiosaurian propodial (a limb bone).

== See also ==
- Timeline of plesiosaur research
- List of plesiosaur genera
