= 1923 in paleontology =

Paleontology or palaeontology is the study of prehistoric life forms on Earth through the examination of plant and animal fossils. This includes the study of body fossils, tracks (ichnites), burrows, cast-off parts, fossilised feces (coprolites), palynomorphs and chemical residues. Because humans have encountered fossils for millennia, paleontology has a long history both before and after becoming formalized as a science. This article records significant discoveries and events related to paleontology that occurred or were published in the year 1923.

== Plants ==
=== Conifers ===
==== Araucariaceae ====
Name	Novelty	Status	Authors	Age	Type locality	Location	Notes	Images
Araucarioxylon texense	Sp nov		Torrey	Cretaceous; Comanchean	Glen Rose Formation	US; Texas	An araucarian wood morphospecies	Araucarioxylon texense

==== †Cheirolepidiaceae ====
Name	Novelty	Status	Authors	Age	Type locality	Location	Notes	Images
Brachyoxylon comanchense	Sp nov		Torrey	Cretaceous; Comanchean	Glen Rose Formation	US; Texas	A cheirolepidiaceous wood morphospecies	Brachyoxylon comanchense
Brachyoxylon raritanense	Sp nov		Torrey	Cretaceous; Turonian	Raritan Formation	US; New Jersey	A cheirolepidiaceous wood morphospecies	Brachyoxylon raritanense
Brachyoxylon woodworthianum	Sp nov		Torrey	Cretaceous; Turonian	Raritan Formation	US; Massachusetts	A cheirolepidiaceous wood morphospecies	Brachyoxylon woodworthianum
Telephragmoxylon brachyphylloides	Sp nov		Torrey	Cretaceous; Comanchean		US; Texas	A cheirolepidiaceous wood morphospecies Location given as "Weatherford, Texas"	Telephragmoxylon brachyphylloides
Telephragmoxylon comanchense	Sp nov		Torrey	Cretaceous; Comanchean		US; Texas	A cheirolepidiaceous wood morphospecies Location given as "Weatherford, Texas"	Telephragmoxylon comanchense
Voltzioxylon	Gen et sp nov	jr synonym	Torrey	Triassic; Late Triassic	Dockum group	US; Texas	A cheirolepidiaceous wood morphogenus Considered a jr synonym of Protocupressinoxylon (1949); The type species is V. dockumense	Protocupressinoxylon dockumense

==== Cupressaceae ====
Name	Novelty	Status	Authors	Age	Type locality	Location	Notes	Images
Metacupressinoxylon	Gen et comb nov		Torrey	Jurassic		UK; England	A cupressaceous wood morphogenus The type species is Paracupressinoxylon cedroides (1913)	
Paracupressinoxylon trinitense	Sp nov		Torrey	Cretaceous; Comanchean	Trinity Group	US; Texas	A cupressaceous wood morphospecies location given as "near Weatherford, Texas"	Paracupressinoxylon trinitense
Sequoioxylon	Gen, sp, et comb nov		Torrey	Cretaceous; Maastrichtian	Laramie Formation	US; Montana	A redwood wood morphogenus The type species is S. montanense Includes the new species S. dakotense, S. laramense Also includes Sequoia burgessii (1903)	Sequoioxylon montanense

==== Pinaceae ====
Name	Novelty	Status	Authors	Age	Type locality	Location	Notes	Images
Abies longirostris	Sp nov	jr Synonym	Knowlton	Oligocene; Chattian	Creede Formation	US; Colorado	A possible bristlecone fir species A jr synonym of Abies rigida (1990)	
Abies rigida	Sp nov	valid	Knowlton	Oligocene; Chattian	Creede Formation	US; Colorado	A possible bristlecone fir species	Abies rigida
Pinus coloradensis	Sp nov	jr synonym	Knowlton	Oligocene; Chattian	Creede Formation	US; Colorado	A bristle cone pine species A jr synonym of Pinus crossii (1990)	
Pinus crossii	Sp nov	Valid	Knowlton	Oligocene; Chattian	Creede Formation	US; Colorado	A bristle cone pine species	
Pinus similis	Sp nov	jr synonym	Knowlton	Oligocene; Chattian	Creede Formation	US; Colorado	A bristle cone pine species A jr synonym of Pinus crossii (1990)	
Pityoxylon scituatensiforme	Comb nov		(Bailey) Torrey	Cretaceous; Turonian	Raritan Formation	US; New Jersey	A pinaceous wood morphospecies Moved from Pinus scituatensiforme (1911)	Pityoxylon scituatensiforme
Pseudotsuga annulata	Comb nov		(Platen) Torrey	Pliocene		US; California	A Douglas fir wood morphospecies Moved from Pityoxylon annulatum (1907)	Pseudotsuga annulata

==== Podocarpaceae ====
Name	Novelty	Status	Authors	Age	Type locality	Location	Notes	Images
Podocarpoxylon dakotense	Sp nov		Torrey	Cretaceous	Laramie group	US; North Dakota	A "podocarpaceous" wood morphospecies Podocarpoxylon Noted by Torrey to be very similar to Cupressaceae and problematic in definition.	
Podocarpoxylon texense	Sp nov		Torrey	Eocene		US; Texas	A podocarpaceous wood morphospecies Location given as "lignite mine at Rockdale station, Texas" Podocarpoxylon Noted by Torrey to be very similar to Cupressaceae and problematic in definition.	Podocarpoxylon texense
Podocarpoxylon washingtonense	Sp nov		Torrey	Miocene	Wilkes Formation	US; Washington	A podocarpaceous wood morphospecies Location given as "Salmon Creek"; Podocarpoxylon Noted by Torrey to be very similar to Cupressaceae and problematic in definition.	Podocarpoxylon washingtonense

=== Angiosperms ===
==== Basal eudicots ====
Name	Novelty	Status	Authors	Age	Type locality	Location	Notes	Images
Odostemon hakeaefolia	Comb nov	Jr synonym	(Lesquereux) Knowlton	Eocene; Priabonian	Florissant Formation	US; Colorado	A Mahonia species Moved from Lomatia hakeaefolia (1883); Moved to Mahonia hakeaefolia (1936); Specimens from Creede combined into Mahonia aceroides (1990)	
Odostemon(?) marginata	Comb nov	Jr synonym	(Lesquereux) Knowlton	Eocene; Priabonian	Florissant Formation	US; Colorado	A Mahonia species Moved from Hedera marginata (1883); Moved to Mahonia marginata (1936); Specimens from Creede combined into Mahonia aceroides (1990)	

==== Superroids ====
===== Fagales =====
Name	Novelty	Status	Authors	Age	Type locality	Location	Notes	Images
Alnus? larseni	Sp nov	jr synonym	Knowlton	Oligocene; Chattian	Creede Formation	US; Colorado	First identified as a possible Alder species Moved to Populus larsenii (1990)	
Rubus? inquirendus	Sp nov		Knowlton	Oligocene; Chattian	Creede Formation	US; Colorado	A possible bramble species flower	

===== Malvales =====
Name	Novelty	Status	Authors	Age	Type locality	Location	Notes	Images
Sterculia aceroides	Sp nov	Jr synonym	Knowlton	Oligocene; Chattian	Creede Formation	US; Colorado	First identified as a Sterculia species Moved to Mahonia aceroides (1990)	

==== Incertae sedis ====
Name	Novelty	Status	Authors	Age	Type locality	Location	Notes	Images
Phyllites potentilloides	Sp nov	jr synonym	Knowlton	Oligocene; Chattian	Huerto Formation	US; Colorado	First identified as a leaf of uncertain affiliation Moved to Sorbus potentilloldes (1987)	

== Arthropoda ==
=== Insects ===
Name	Novelty	Status	Authors	Age	Unit	Location	Notes	Images
Archimyrmex	Gen et sp nov	valid	Cockerell	Eocene; Lutetian	Green River Formation	USA	A myrmeciine ant The type species is A. rostratus	Archimyrmex rostratus

== Archosauromorpha ==
=== Dinosaurs ===
==== New taxa ====
Taxon	Novelty	Status	Author(s)	Age	Unit	Location	Notes	Images
Altispinax	Gen. et sp. nov.	Valid	Huene	Valanginian	Wadhurst Clay Formation	England	A possible carcharodontosaurid	
Corythosaurus excavatus	Sp. nov.	Jr. synonym	Gilmore	Campanian	Dinosaur Park Formation	Alberta	Junior synonym of Corythosaurus intermedius	
Corythosaurus intermedius	Sp. nov.	Valid	Parks	Campanian	Dinosaur Park Formation	Alberta	A species of Corythosaurus	
Lambeosaurus	Gen. et sp. nov.	Valid	Parks	Campanian	Dinosaur Park Formation	Alberta	A lambeosaurine hadrosaurid	
Lametasaurus	Gen. et sp. nov	Nomen dubium	Matley	Maastrichtian	Lameta Formation	India	A composite of abelisaurid and titanosaur remains	
Pentaceratops	Gen. et sp. nov.	Valid	Osborn	Campanian	Kirtland Formation	New Mexico	A chasmosaurine ceratopsid	
Protiguanodon	Gen. et sp. nov.	Junior synonym	Osborn	Barremian	Öösh Formation	Mongolia	A junior synonym of Psittacosaurus.	
Protoceratops	Gen. et sp. nov.	Valid	Granger & Gregory	Campanian	Djadochta Formation	Mongolia	A protoceratopsid ceratopsian	
"Protrachodon"		Nomen nudum	Nopcsa	Maastrichtian	Haţeg Basin	Romania	Mentioned in passing during discussion of Orthomerus	
Psittacosaurus	Gen. et sp. nov.	Valid	Osborn	Barremian	Öösh Formation	Mongolia	A psittacosaurid ceratopsian.	
Thecocoelurus	Gen. nov.	Nomen dubium	Huene	Barremian	Wessex Formation	England	New genus for "Thecospondylus" daviesi Seeley, 1888	

=== Pterosaurs ===
==== New taxa ====
Name	Status	Authors	Age	Unit	Location	Notes	Images
Anurognathus	Valid	Döderlein	Tithonian	Solnhofen Limestone	Germany	An anurognathid. a Pterosaur with a Bat-like lifestyle.	Anurognathus

== Synapsids ==
=== Non-mammalian ===
Name	Status	Authors	Age	Location	Notes	Images
Burnetia	Valid	Robert Broom	255 million years ago	South Africa	A biarmosuchian, a member of Burnetiidae. with weird-looking knobs on its head.	Burnetia
Dinophoneus	Junior synonym	Robert Broom		South Africa	A titanosuchid. Junior synonym of Jonkeria.	
