= Claorhynchus =

Claorhynchus Temporal range: Late Cretaceous, 69–68 Ma

Scientific classification
- Domain: Eukaryota
- Kingdom: Animalia
- Phylum: Chordata
- Clade: Dinosauria
- Clade: †Ornithischia
- Genus: †Claorhynchus; Cope, 1892
- Species: †C. trihedrus

Binomial name
- †Claorhynchus trihedrus Cope, 1892

Extinct genus of dinosaurs

Claorhynchus (meaning "broken beak", as it is based on broken bones from the snout region) is a dubious genus of cerapodan dinosaur with a confusing history behind it. It has been considered to be both a hadrosaurid and a ceratopsid, sometimes the same as Triceratops, with two different assignments as to discovery formation and location, and what bones make up its type remains.

== History ==
The holotype specimen, AMNH 3978, was described by American paleontologist Edward Drinker Cope in 1892, who interpreted it as the rostral bone and predentary of a member of Agathaumidae from the Laramie Formation of Colorado. It was reinterpreted as a hadrosaurid, though, by American paleontologist John Bell Hatcher in 1902 and removed as a ceratopsid. In 1904, Franz Baron Nopcsa reclassified it as a ceratopsid. In their influential monograph, Richard Swann Lull and Nelda E. Wright regarded the genus as a dubious type of hadrosaurid, based on premaxillae and a predentary.

This opinion stood until the work of Michael K. Brett-Surman, who stated in his dissertation that, having rediscovered and reexamined the material with Douglas A. Lawson, it was most likely part of a ceratopsid's neck frill, probably part of the squamosal of Triceratops. This information reached Donald F. Glut's series of dinosaur encyclopedias in a confusing form; its entry states that a squamosal and tooth from South Dakota were referred to the genus, and these are what Brett-Surman and Lawson identified, keeping the supposed beak remains separate. Additionally, other major reviews have left the genus as an indeterminate hadrosaurid.
