= Creede Formation =

Geologic formation in Colorado, United States

- Stratigraphic range: Oligocene (Chattian); 27.2 Ma
- Type: Formation

Lithology
- Primary: Lacustrine

Location
- Region: Colorado
- Country: United States

The Creede Formation is a geologic formation in Colorado, United States. It preserves fossils dating back to the Paleogene period, particularly many well-preserved fossil plants from Oligocene strata. The Formation was named by Emmons and Larsen in 1923. It stands out from the surrounding areas, which are mostly volcanic, as it is formed from deposits from surrounding waters. The formation has a vertical range of over 2,400 feet.

Some examples of flora fossils found in the Creede Formation include conifers, Glumiflorae, Berberidaceae, and a broad-leaf tree Catalpa. The formation is unique as the only fossil plant locality from the Oligocene period found in the southern Rocky Mountains.

The name comes from the town of Creede, Colorado. The Formation is near it, in the San Juan Mountains province.

== See also ==
- List of fossiliferous stratigraphic units in Colorado
- Paleontology in Colorado
