= Filikomys =

Filikomys Temporal range: 72 Ma

Scientific classification
- Kingdom: Animalia
- Phylum: Chordata
- Class: Mammalia
- Order: †Multituberculata
- Superfamily: †Ptilodontoidea
- Genus: †Filikomys; Weaver, 2020

Species
- F. primaevus Lambe, 1902; F. minor? Eaton, 2002

Synonyms
- Ptilodus primaevus Lambe, 1902

Extinct genus of mammals

Filikomys is an extinct genus of mammal from the Campanian of North America. A multituberculate, it demonstrates complex social behaviours were present in these early mammals. The type species is F. primaevus; a second, smaller species, F. minor, has been tentatively assigned to the genus.

== Description ==
Filikomys primaevus is a roughly squirrel sized mammal. Several individuals were found within the same locale. The holotype is a dentary, NMC 1890.

== Etymology ==
From Greek Filikós "friendly", and mys, mouse, alluding to its social behaviour. Primaevus is Latin for youthful.

== Classification ==
Filikomys primaevus is nested among the Ptilodontoidea.

== Social behaviour ==
Several individuals were found co-habitating a burrow. This suggests multituberculates had complex social behaviours like modern mammals, which in particular have been compared to the social complexity of placentals.
