= Prodicynodon =

Prodicynodon Temporal range: Late Permian

Scientific classification
- Kingdom: Animalia
- Phylum: Chordata
- Clade: Synapsida
- Clade: Therapsida
- Clade: †Anomodontia
- Clade: †Dicynodontia
- Genus: †Prodicynodon; Broom, 1904

Type species
- Prodicynodon pearstonensis Broom, 1904

Other species
- P. beaufortensis Broom, 1912

Extinct genus of tetrapods

Prodicynodon is an extinct genus of dicynodont from the Late Permian of South Africa. Two species are known, the type species P. pearstonensis and P. beaufortensis, both known only from their respective holotypes.

The holotypes of both Prodicynodon species are small, and some authors have considered Prodicynodon either a senior synonym of Chelydontops or a juvenile Endothiodon. However, in a 2014 abstract for the annual meeting of the Society of Vertebrate Paleontology, Christian Kammerer and colleagues considered Prodicynodon a valid genus closely related to Therochelonia based on CT scanning and unpublished phylogenetic results, even while agreeing with King (1988) that the Prodicynodon specimens were juvenile.

== See also ==
- List of therapsids
