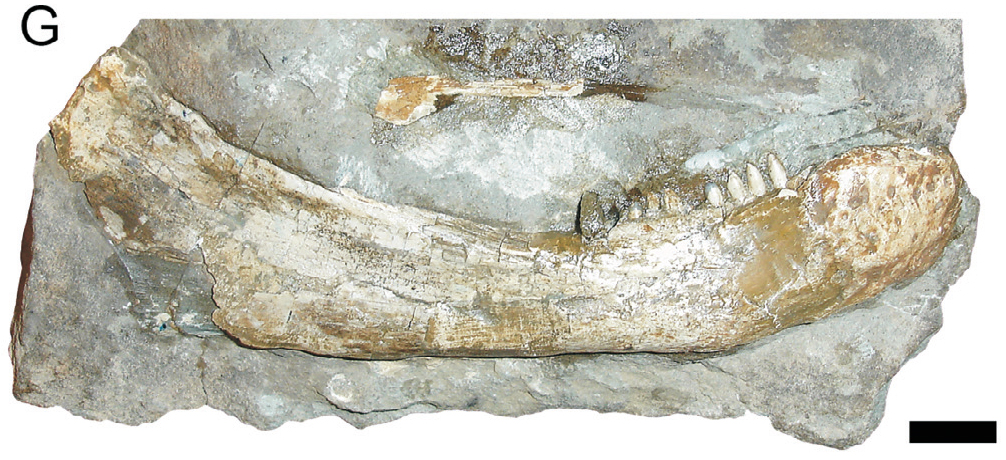
- Holotype right dentary

Scientific classification
- Domain: Eukaryota
- Kingdom: Animalia
- Phylum: Chordata
- Clade: Synapsida
- Genus: †Arnognathus; Broom, 1907

= Arnognathus =

Extinct genus of synapsids

Arnognathus is an extinct genus of non-mammalian synapsids.

== See also ==
- List of therapsids
