= Alopecorhinus =

Scientific classification
- Domain: Eukaryota
- Kingdom: Animalia
- Phylum: Chordata
- Clade: Synapsida
- Clade: Therapsida
- Clade: †Therocephalia
- Family: †Scylacosauridae
- Genus: †Alopecorhinus; Broom, 1912

Extinct genus of therapsids

Alopecorhinus is an extinct genus of therocephalian therapsids.

== See also ==
- List of therapsids
