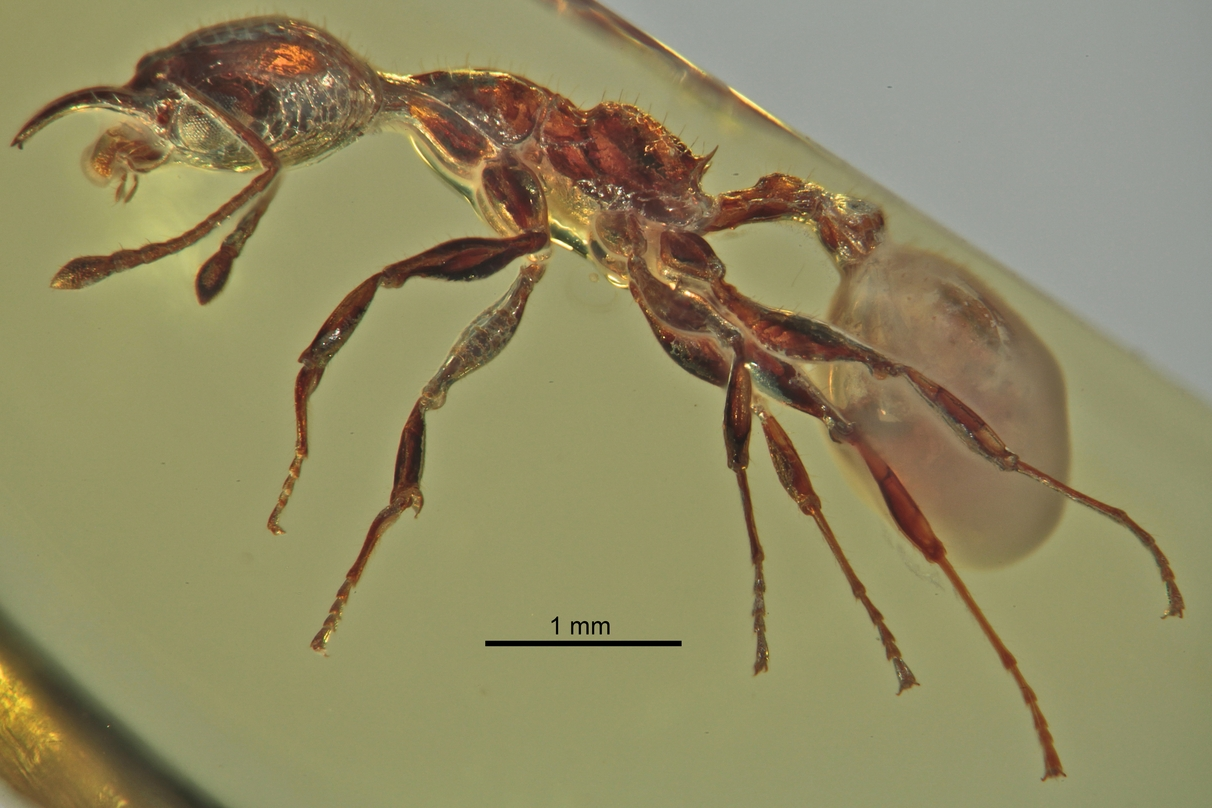
- E. klebsi worker close-up view

Scientific classification
- Kingdom: Animalia
- Phylum: Arthropoda
- Class: Insecta
- Order: Hymenoptera
- Family: Formicidae
- Subfamily: Myrmicinae
- Tribe: incertae sedis
- Genus: †Electromyrmex
- Species: †E. klebsi

Binomial name
- †Electromyrmex klebsi Wheeler, 1910

= Electromyrmex =

Electromyrmex Temporal range: Middle Eocene

Genus of ants

Electromyrmex is an extinct genus of ants in the formicid subfamily Myrmicinae. The genus contains a single described species, Electromyrmex klebsi and is known from a group of Middle Eocene fossils which were found in Europe.

== History and classification ==
Electromyrmex is known from several fossil specimens of adult workers. A worker was first discovered preserved as an inclusion in a transparent chunk of Baltic amber, and additional workers have been identified from Baltic amber found in Lithuania. Workers of an undescribed species labeled as "Electromyrmex sp A" have been found in Bitterfeld amber.

Baltic amber is approximately forty six million years old, having been deposited during Lutetian stage of the Middle Eocene. There is debate on what plant family the amber was produced by, with macrofossil and microfossil evidence suggesting a Pinus relative, while chemical and spectroscopic evidence suggests Agathis or Sciadopitys. The paleoenvironment of the Eocene Baltic forests where the P. eocenicum lived was that of humid temperate to subtropical islands. The forests were composed of mostly Quercus and Pinus species, while the lower sections of the forests had paratropical plant elements, such as palms.

The genus and species were first mentioned by entomologist William Morton Wheeler in 1908 and again in 1910. However neither the 1908 or 1910 publications were accompanied by a description of the genus or species, rather they were noted as to be described later. Wheeler published a formal description for Electromyrmex in his 1915 work The ants of the Baltic amber, seven years after first publishing the name. When first examined and described, the type worker was in the private collection of Professor Richard Klebs of Königsberg University, who first interested Wheeler on working with Baltic amber ant specimens. Sometime after the 1910 type description, the specimen, along with parts of the Klebs collection, was moved to the Georg-August University Geoscientific Center. An additional two fossils in the University of Rennes 1 collections have been identified as E. klebsi workers.

Wheeler placed the genus into the Myrmicinae tribe Myrmicini, and this placement was unchanged until 1988. In a paper discussing the early evolution of ants, the genus was treated as incertae sedis in Myrmicinae, with no tribal assignment. Based on the slender nature of the body and appendages, combined with large forward placed eyes, Wheeler suggested an arboreal habit similar to the living genera Pseudomyrma and "Sima" (now called Tetraponera).

== Description ==
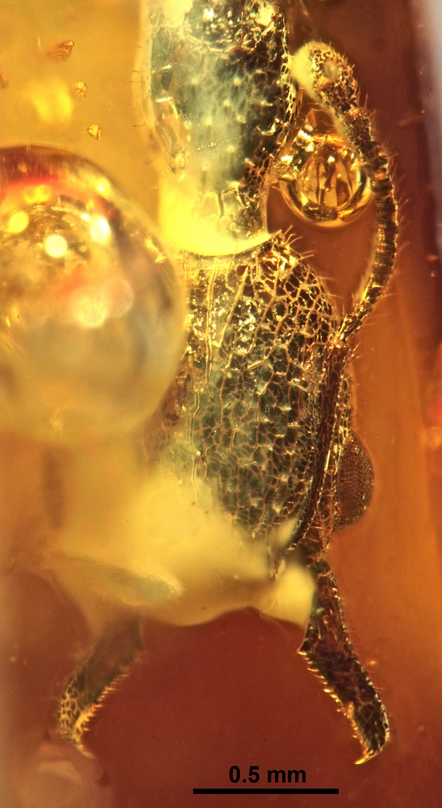
closeup of head showing mandibles, eyes, and antennae

The worker described by Wheeler is estimated to be about 5.5 mm (0.22 in). The exoskeleton is a mix of smooth and ridged textures, with longitudinal ridges on the head, petiole and postpetiole, while the mesopleurae and epinotum have transverse ridges. In contrast the gaster, pronotum and mandibles plus clypeus are shining and smooth. The overall coloration of the workers is black, with a silvery luster present on most of the body. The large head is rectangular, narrowing to a prominent concave rear margin. The eyes are large and positioned near the front of the head, while there are no ocelli visible on the head. The mandibles are elongated, slightly curved near the bases, and narrow. They are separated into distinct base and masticatory areas, with very small uniform teeth populating the whole length of the chewing edge.

The thorax forms a slender neck from the prothorax, on which the head is connected, and the remainder of the thorax is narrower in width than the head. The upper surface of the thorax is divided by a distinct constriction between the mesonotum and epinotum. Two small spines rise from the rear edge of the epinotum. The petiole is thin with no teeth on the underside and only a slight thickening into a node on the upper surface. The abdominal segment connected to the petiole is modified into a postpetiole that is thicker and a little shorter than the petiole, and which has a distinct convex curve to the upper surface. Of similar size as the head, the gaster has a notably enlarged first segment and in the holotype specimen the remaining abdominal segments are withdrawn into it.
