= Öösh Formation =

Geological formation in Övörkhangai, Mongolia

- Stratigraphic range: Berriasian-Barremian; ~141–125 Ma
- Type: Geological formation
- Sub-units: Cannonball beds
- Underlies: Basalt
- Overlies: Basement
- Thickness: 600 m (2,000 ft)

Lithology
- Primary: Sandstone, claystone, shale
- Other: Siltstone

Location
- Coordinates: 44.2°N 102.7°E
- Approximate paleocoordinates: 45.0°N 103.3°E
- Region: Ovorkhangai
- Country: Mongolia
- Öösh Formation (Mongolia)

The Öösh Formation, also known as the Tevsh Formation, is a geological formation of Lower Cretaceous strata in Övörkhangai Province, Mongolia. Dinosaur remains are among the fossils that have been recovered from the formation. It overlies folded and metamorphosed basement strata of the Gobi region, and is capped by basalt. The succession is around 600 metres thick and consists of red claystones and sandstones, along with black thinly laminated shales. The claystones and sandstones were deposited as part of an alluvial fan system, while the shales were deposited in lakes present in the foot of the fan. Many of the fossils come from the "Cannonball beds", which comprise the lowest 60 metres of the unit and consist of green siltstone.

== Vertebrate paleofauna ==
=== Dinosaurs ===
Dinosaurs of the Öösh Formation
Genus	Species	Location	Stratigraphic position	Material	Notes	Images
Asiatosaurus	A. mongoliensis			Teeth	Indeterminate sauropod	
Halszkaraptorinae indet.				ISMD-VP09, preserving a maxillary fragment, two teeth, and partial appendicular elements	Halszkaraptorine	
Prodeinodon	P. mongoliensis			Several teeth, fragmentary tibia, fragmentary fibula	Indeterminate theropod	
Protiguanodon	P. mongoliensis				Reclassified as a species of Psittacosaurus, Psittacosaurus protiguanodonensis	
Psittacosaurus	P. mongoliensis					Psittacosaurus fossil from the Hühteeg Svita with gastroliths in its stomach region, American Museum of Natural History
Psittacosaurus	P. protiguanodonensis				Junior synonym of P. mongoliensis	Psittacosaurus fossil from the Hühteeg Svita with gastroliths in its stomach region, American Museum of Natural History
Shanag	S. ashile			Upper and lower jaw fragment (IGM 100/1119)	A paravian, possibly a dromaeosaur	

=== Mammals ===
Mammals of the Öösh Formation
Genus	Species	Location	Stratigraphic position	Material	Notes	Images
Gobiconodon	G. hopsoni		Cannonball Member of Öösh Formation, possibly equivalent of Tevsh Formation	Two upper and lower jaws (PSS-MAE 140 (Holotype) & PSS-MAE 139)		

=== Pterosaurs ===
Pterosaurs of the Öösh Formation
Genus	Species	Location	Stratigraphic position	Material	Notes	Images
Indeterminate tapejaroid				"Single cervical vertebra (IGM 100/1321)"		

=== Squamates ===
Squamates of the Öösh Formation
Genus	Species	Location	Stratigraphic position	Material	Notes	Images
Norellius	N. nyctisaurops			"Nearly complete skull with mandibles and partial hyoid"	Gekkonomorph	

Color key: Taxon / Reclassified taxon / Taxon falsely reported as present / Dubious taxon or junior synonym / Ichnotaxon / Ootaxon / Morphotaxon	Notes; Uncertain or tentative taxa are in small text; ~~crossed out~~ taxa are discredited.

== See also ==
- List of dinosaur-bearing rock formations
