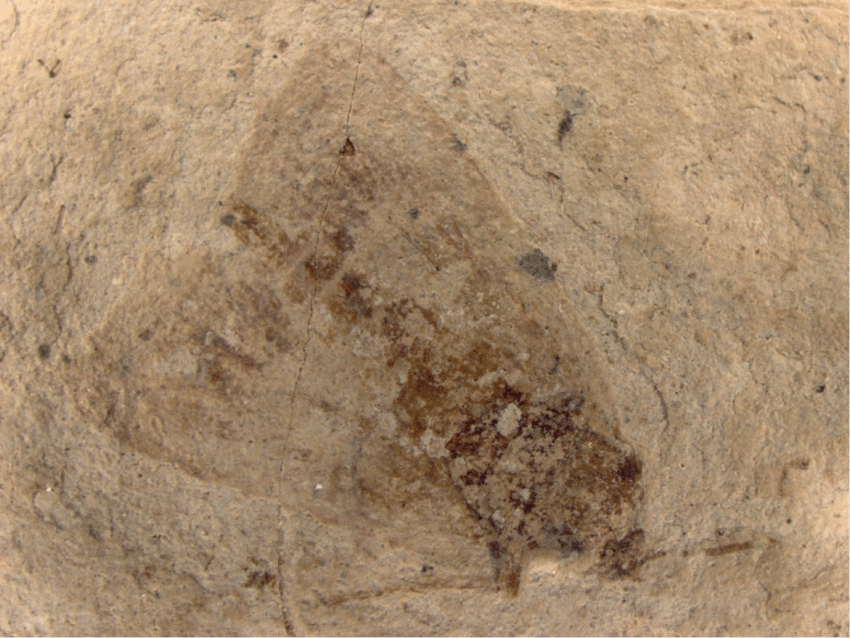
- Holotype specimen of P. destructus

Scientific classification
- Kingdom: Animalia
- Phylum: Arthropoda
- Clade: Pancrustacea
- Class: Insecta
- Order: Lepidoptera
- Family: incertae sedis
- Genus: †Paleolepidopterites; Heikkilä et al., 2018

Species
- †P. destructus (Cockerell, 1917); †P. florissantanus (Cockerell, 1907); †P. sadilenkoi (Koslov, 1988)

Synonyms
- Tortrix? destructus Cockerell, 1917; Tortrix? florissantana Cockerell, 1907; Tortricites sadilenkoi Koslov, 1988; Tortricites skalskii? Koslov, in Ponomarenko, 1988

= Paleolepidopterites =

Paleolepidopterites Temporal range: Eocene, Lutetian - Priabonian

Extinct fossil genus of tortrix moths

Paleolepidopterites is a collective genus of fossil moths which can not be placed in any defined family. The included species were formerly placed in the leaf-roller family Tortricidae and are known from fossils found in Russia and the United States (specifically Colorado). The collective genus contains three species: Paleolepidopterites destructus, Paleolepidopterites florissantanus, and Paleolepidopterites sadilenkoi, formerly placed within the genera Tortrix and Tortricites respectively. The three species were formally redescribed and moved to the new collective genus by Heikkilä et al. (2018).

== Distribution ==
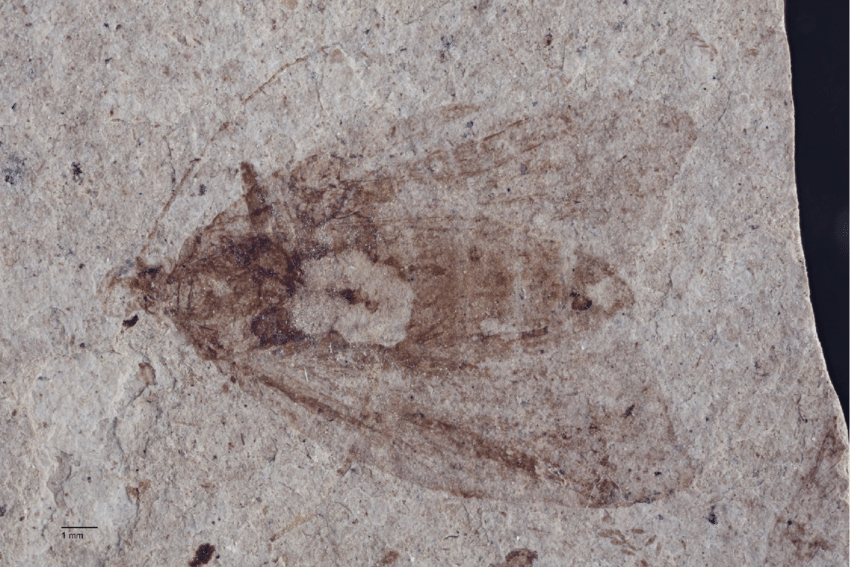
Holotype of P. florissantanus

Two of the species were recovered from the late Eocene, Lutetian and Priabonian stages, Florissant Formation lake deposits near the small community of Florissant in Teller County, Colorado, United States. The holotype of P. destructus was recovered from fossiliferous outcrops on the ranch of George W. Wilson, while the P. florissantanus holotype came from outcrops at Station 14.

== Species ==
=== P. destructus ===
P. destructus is known only from one fossil, the holotype, specimen "USNM 61998", which was first described as Tortrix? destructus. It is a single, mostly complete adult of undetermined sex, preserved as a compression fossil in fine grained shale. The type specimen is currently preserved in the paleoentomological collections housed in the National Museum of Natural History, part of the Smithsonian Institution, located in Washington, D.C., United States. P. destructus was first studied by Dr Theodore D. A. Cockerell of the University of Colorado, with his 1917 type description being published in the Proceedings of the United States National Museum. Cockerell did not provide an explanation for the specific epithet destructus.

=== P. florissantanus ===
P. florissantanus is also known only from the holotype, number "NHM-I.8429" for part side and "UCM 8579" for the counterpart side. It's a single, mostly complete adult female, preserved as a compression fossil in fine grained shale. One side of the type specimen is currently preserved in the paleoentomological collections housed in the Natural History Museum located in London, England, while the other side is in the collections of the University of Colorado. P. florissantanus was first studied by Dr Theodore D. A. Cockerell of the University of Colorado, with his 1907 type description being published in the journal Canadian Entomologist. Cockerell did not provide an explanation for the specific epithet florissantana.

P. florissantanus is about 14 millimetres (0.55 in) long with a robust thorax. The abdomen is covered by the wings which are preserved in resting position. The antenna are preserved showing minute dark spots at intervals along their length. The fore wings overall length is not specified, however the outer margin is 5 millimetres (0.20 in) and the lower margin is 10 millimetres (0.39 in). The hind-wings are 10.33 millimetres (0.407 in) in length. Most of the fore and hind wing scales are missing eliminating most of the color patterning. The fore wings were possibly striped along the veins with a notable darkening along the apex of the hind wings. The gently curving wing margin, lacking a projection, and the arched costa indicate a member of the family Tortricidae, rather than the similar family Pyralidae.

=== P. sadilenkoi ===
The holotype of P. sadilenkoi, Sadilenko 4, was discovered in a chunk of Baltic amber found in the Kaliningrad Oblast that dated back to the Priabonian age.

== Description ==
Paleolepidopterites is about 8.3 millimetres (0.33 in) long with a robust thorax and an abdomen which tapers towards the tip. The slender antenna are 4.5 millimetres (0.18 in) long, with tips that curl to form almost a circle, and are reddish in coloration. Where visible the legs are either hairy or scaly. The forewings are 8.3 millimetres (0.33 in) in length with a 3.5 millimetres (0.14 in) outer margin and a 7.3 millimetres (0.29 in) lower margin. The hindwing length is not specified, the color patterning is described, with the hindwings longitudinally striped and a broad but diffuse submarginal band.

P. destructus is noted to be much smaller than the other Paleolepidopterites species from Florissant, P. florissantana.
