= 1891 in paleontology =

Paleontology or palaeontology is the study of prehistoric life forms on Earth through the examination of plant and animal fossils. This includes the study of body fossils, tracks (ichnites), burrows, cast-off parts, fossilised feces (coprolites), palynomorphs and chemical residues. Because humans have encountered fossils for millennia, paleontology has a long history both before and after becoming formalized as a science. This article records significant discoveries and events related to paleontology that occurred or were published in the year 1891.

== Arthropods ==
=== Newly named insects ===
Name	Novelty	Status	Authors	Age	Unit	Location	Notes	Images
Aeromyrma antiqua	Comb nov	jr synonym	(Mayr, 1868)	Middle Eocene	Baltic amber	Europe	Fossil myrmicine ant, moved to Erebomyrma antiqua in 1915; Synonym of Carebara antiqua	Carebara antiqua
Cataulacus planiceps	Sp nov	valid	Emery	Late Eocene? - Middle Miocene?	Sicilian amber	Italy: Sicily	A myrmicine ant.	Cataulacus planiceps
Cataulacus silvestrii	Sp nov	valid	Emery	Late Eocene? - Middle Miocene?	Sicilian amber	Italy: Sicily	A myrmicine ant.	Cataulacus silvestrii
Ectatomma gracile	Sp nov	valid	Emery	Late Eocene? - Middle Miocene?	Sicilian amber	Italy: Sicily	An ectatommine ant.	Ectatomma gracile
Hypopomyrmex	Gen et sp nov	valid	Emery	Late Eocene? - Middle Miocene?	Sicilian amber	Italy: Sicily	A myrmicine ant. Type species H. bombiccii	Hypopomyrmex bombiccii
Plagiolepis labilis	Sp nov	valid	Emery	Late Eocene? - Middle Miocene?	Sicilian amber	Italy: Sicily	A formicine ant.	Plagiolepis labilis
Ponera leptocephala	Sp nov	valid	Emery	Late Eocene? - Middle Miocene?	Sicilian amber	Italy: Sicily	A ponerine ant.	Ponera leptocephala

== Archosauromorphs ==
=== Newly named dinosaurs ===
Name	Novelty	Status	Authors	Age	Unit	Location	Notes	Images
Agrosaurus	Gen et sp nov	Possible jr. synonym	Seeley	Rhaetian?		England	Possible junior subjective synonym of Thecodontosaurus.	
Ammosaurus	Gen nov	synonym	Marsh	Early Jurassic		USA (Connecticut) (Massachusetts) Jr synonym of Anchisaurus polyzelus	Anchisaurus polyzelus	
Calamosaurus	Gen et comb nov	Nomen dubium	Lydekker	Barremian	Wessex Formation	England	a possible basal coelurosaurian	Calamosaurus foxi
Sterrholophus	Gen et comb nov	Jr. synonym	Marsh	Maastrichtian	Lance Formation	USA	Type species S. flabellatus Junior subjective synonym of Triceratops horridus.	Triceratops horridus
Torosaurus	Gen et 2 sp	Valid	Marsh	Maastrichtian	Lance Formation	USA; Texas		Torosaurus.

=== Newly named birds ===
Name	Status	Authors	Notes
Dryornis pampeanus	Valid	Moreno & Mercerat	
Neochen debilis	Valid	Florentino Ameghino	
