= 1906 in paleontology =

Paleontology or palaeontology is the study of prehistoric life forms on Earth through the examination of plant and animal fossils. This includes the study of body fossils, tracks (ichnites), burrows, cast-off parts, fossilised feces (coprolites), palynomorphs and chemical residues. Because humans have encountered fossils for millennia, paleontology has a long history both before and after becoming formalized as a science. This article records significant discoveries and events related to paleontology that occurred or were published in the year 1906.

== Arthropods ==
=== Insects ===
Name	Novelty	Status	Authors	Age	Unit	Location	Notes	Images
Calyptapis	Gen et sp nov	Valid	Cockerell	Priabonian	Florissant Formation	USA	A Bombini bumblebee relative. Type species is C. florissantensis	Calyptapis florissantensis
Palaeovespa	Gen et sp. nov	valid	Cockerell	Priabonian	Florissant Formation	USA	A Vespidae wasp, with three species P. florissantia, P. gillettei, and P. scudderi	Palaeovespa florissantia
Protostephanus	Gen et sp. nov	valid	Cockerell	Priabonian	Florissant Formation	USA	A Stephanidae wasp Type species P. ashmeadi	

== Archosauromorphs ==
- Apatosaurus gastroliths documented.
- Wieland claims to have found stegosaur gastroliths.

=== Dinosaurs ===
Data courtesy of George Olshevsky's dinosaur genera list.

Name	Status	Authors	Notes	Images
"Proceratops"	Junior synonym.	Richard Swann Lull	Junior synonym of Ceratops.	
