= 1907 in paleontology =

Paleontology or palaeontology is the study of prehistoric life forms on Earth through the examination of plant and animal fossils. This includes the study of body fossils, tracks (ichnites), burrows, cast-off parts, fossilised feces (coprolites), palynomorphs and chemical residues. Because humans have encountered fossils for millennia, paleontology has a long history both before and after becoming formalized as a science. This article records significant discoveries and events related to paleontology that occurred or were published in the year 1907.

== Plants ==
=== Ferns and fern allies ===
Name	Novelty	Status	Authors	Age	Type locality	Location	Notes	Images
Cladophlebis skagitensis	Sp nov		Penhallow	Lower Cretaceous		Canada; British Columbia	A Cladophlebis pinnule	
Nilsonia pasaytensis	Sp nov		Penhallow	Lower Cretaceous		Canada; British Columbia	A Nilsonia foliage	

=== Conifers ===
Name	Novelty	Status	Authors	Age	Type locality	Location	Notes	Images
Picea columbiensis	Sp nov	valid	Penhallow	Early Eocene; Ypresian	Kettle River Formation?	Canada; British Columbia	A cone and foliage Spruce species.	Picea columbiensis
Pinus columbiana	Sp nov		Penhallow	Early Eocene; Ypresian	Kettle River Formation?	Canada; British Columbia	A wood and cone pine species.	Pinus columbiana

=== Flowering plants ===
Name	Novelty	Status	Authors	Age	Type locality	Location	Notes	Images
Myrica serrata	Sp nov		Penhallow	Lower Cretaceous		Canada; British Columbia	A Myrica? foliage	
Ulmus columbiana	Sp nov	jr synonym	Penhallow	Early Eocene; Ypresian	Kettle River Formation?	Canada; British Columbia	An elm wood species. Moved to Ulminium columbianum in 1922	Ulminium columbianum
Ulmus protoamericana	Sp nov		Penhallow	Early Eocene; Ypresian	Kettle River Formation?	Canada; British Columbia	An elm wood species.	Ulmus protoamericana
Ulmus protoracemosa	Sp nov		Penhallow	Early Eocene; Ypresian	Kettle River Formation?	Canada; British Columbia	An elm wood species.	Ulmus protoracemosa

== Arthropods ==
=== Insects ===
Name	Novelty	Status	Authors	Age	Type locality	Location	Notes	Images
Megaraphidia	Gen et Sp nov	valid	Cockerell	Eocene; Priabonian	Florissant Formation	USA; Colorado	A raphidiid snakefly The type species is M. elegans Moved to Raphidia elegans in 1936; Moved back to M. elegans in 2014	Megaraphidia elegans
Tortrix? florissantana	sp. nov	jr synonym	Cockerell	Priabonian	Florissant Formation	USA; Colorado	A moth of uncertain placement, moved to Paleolepidopterites florissantanus (2018)	Paleolepidopterites florissantanus

== Archosaurs ==
- Wieland claims to have found stegosaur gastroliths.
- Brown argues that Wieland's alleged stegosaur gastroliths were "not associated with the stegosaur bones in question."
- Possible hadrosaur gastroliths documented.

=== Newly named ornithodirans ===
Data courtesy of George Olshevsky's dinosaur genera list.

Name	Novelty	Status	Authors	Age	Unit	Location	Notes	Images
Scleromochlus	gen. et sp. nov	Valid	Woodward	Late Triassic	Lossiemouth Sandstone	Scotland	A member of Ornithodira.	Scleromochlus

== Synapsids ==
=== Non-mammalian ===
Name	Novelty	Status	Authors	Age	Unit	Location	Notes	Images
Arnognathus	Gen. et. sp. nov	Valid	Broom	Late Permian	Cistecephalus Assemblage Zone	South Africa	A member of Lycideopsidae.	Galechirus
Galechirus	Gen. et sp. nov	Valid	Broom	Middle Permian	Tapinocephalus Assemblage Zone	South Africa	A member of Galeopidae.	Galechirus
