= 1912 in paleontology =

Paleontology or palaeontology is the study of prehistoric life forms on Earth through the examination of plant and animal fossils. This includes the study of body fossils, tracks (ichnites), burrows, cast-off parts, fossilised feces (coprolites), palynomorphs and chemical residues. Because humans have encountered fossils for millennia, paleontology has a long history both before and after becoming formalized as a science. This article records significant discoveries and events related to paleontology that occurred or were published in the year 1912.

== Plants ==
=== Angiosperms ===
Name	Novelty	Status	Authors	Age	Unit	Location	Synonymized taxa	Notes	Images
Atriplex borealis	Comb nov	jr synonym	(Heer) Laurent	Paleocene late Paleocene	Menat Formation	France; Puy-de-Dôme		Redescribed as a saltbush species. Moved from Anchietea borealis in 1859. Moved to Palaeocarpinus borealis in 2021.	

== Arthropod paleontology ==
Name	Novelty	Status	Authors	Age	Unit	Location	Notes	Images
Burgessia	Gen et sp nov	Valid	Walcott	Cambrian; Miaolingian	Stephen Formation; Burgess Shale	Canada; British Columbia	A stem arthropod of uncertain affinities. The type species is B. bella	Burgessia bella
Leanchoilia	Gen et sp nov	Valid	Walcott	Cambrian; Miaolingian	Stephen Formation; Burgess Shale	Canada; British Columbia	A leanchoiliid megacheirian The type species is L. superlata	Leanchoilia superlata
Waptia	Gen et sp nov	Valid	Walcott	Cambrian; Miaolingian	Stephen Formation; Burgess Shale	Canada; British Columbia	A hymenocarin megacheirian The type species is W. fieldensis	Waptia fieldensis
Yohoia	Gen et sp nov	Valid	Walcott	Cambrian; Miaolingian	Stephen Formation; Burgess Shale	Canada; British Columbia	A yohoiid megacheirian The type species is Y. tenuis	Yohoia tenuis

== Vertebrate paleontology ==
=== non-mammalian synapsids ===
Name	Status	Authors	Age	Location	Notes	Images
Alopecorhinus	Valid			South Africa		
Emydochampsa	Valid			South Africa		
Emydops	Valid	Broom		South Africa; Zambia		
Galeops	Synonym of Emydops.	Broom				
Ictidopsis	Synonym of Thrinaxodon.					
Taurops	Valid	Broom				
Tritheledon	Valid	Broom		South Africa		

=== Mammalians ===
Name	Status	Authors	Age	Location	Notes	Images
Stegomastodon	Valid	Pohlig		United States; Mexico		

=== Dinosaurs ===
Taxon	Novelty	Status	Author(s)	Age	Unit	Location	Notes	Images
Saurolophus osborni	Gen. et sp. nov.	Valid	Brown	Maastrichtian	Horseshoe Canyon Formation	Alberta	A hadrosaurid with a horn-like crest on its head	

== Expeditions, field work, and fossil discoveries ==
- William Edmund Cutler first began collecting fossils, choosing the mouth of Kneehills Creek in Alberta as a prospecting site. According to paleontologist Darren Tanke, Cutler was motivated by "commercial gain".
- Charles H. Sternberg and his sons began working under a contract with the Geological Survey of Canada, which at the time was responsible for maintaining the National Museum of Canada. Lawrence Lambe occupied a supervisory position in the project. The Sternbergs were in competition with Barnum Brown of the American Museum of Natural History through a period that came to be known as the Great Canadian Dinosaur Rush.

== Institutions and organizations ==
=== Natural history museums ===
- The Calgary Public Museum of Alberta, Canada moved to occupy a single floor of the city's Memorial Park Library Building.

== Popular culture ==
=== Literature ===
- The Lost World by Sir Arthur Conan Doyle was published. This novel was the first major fictional portrayal of dinosaurs in the 20th century. It was also the first work of fiction to depict dinosaurs as surviving somewhere in a remote wilderness refuge. Conan Doyle depicted the novel's dinosaurs as cold blooded and stupid. This accurately reflected the scientific thinking of the period, but is now obsolete. Paleontologist William A. S. Sarjeant has characterized Conan Doyle's dinosaurs as otherwise "excellently described".Conan Doyle also incorrectly accepted the prevailing scientific consensus of the period that pterosaurs were poor fliers who depended on gliding to travel. Nevertheless, Sarjeant also noted that while Conan Doyle underestimated pterosaur flying abilities, he anticipated the later scientific conclusion that they were social animals.
