= 1894 in paleontology =

Paleontology or palaeontology is the study of prehistoric life forms on Earth through the examination of plant and animal fossils. This includes the study of body fossils, tracks (ichnites), burrows, cast-off parts, fossilised feces (coprolites), palynomorphs and chemical residues. Because humans have encountered fossils for millennia, paleontology has a long history both before and after becoming formalized as a science. This article records significant discoveries and events related to paleontology that occurred or were published in the year 1894.

== Archosauromorphs ==
=== Newly named pseudosuchians ===
Name	Status	Authors	Age	Unit	Location	Notes	Images
Ornithosuchus	Valid taxon	Newton	Late Triassic (Carnian)	Lossiemouth Sandstone	Scotland	An ornithosuchid.	Ornithosuchus

=== Newly named dinosaurs ===
Name	Status	Authors	Age	Unit	Location	Notes	Images	Images
Dryosaurus	Valid	Othniel Charles Marsh	Late Jurassic (late Kimmeridgian-Tithonian)	Morrison Formation	Portugal; United States (Colorado and Wyoming)	A dryosaurid. New genus for "Laosaurus" altus Marsh (1878).	Dryosaurus	
Hortalotarsus	Jr. synonym	Harry Govier Seeley	Early Jurassic (Hettangian-Sinemurian)			Junior subjective synonym of Massospondylus.		

== Plesiosaurs ==
=== New taxa ===
Name	Status	Authors	Location	Images
Cymatosaurus	Valid	Fritsch	Austria; Germany; Netherlands; Poland	

== Pterosaurs ==
=== New taxa ===
Name	Status	Authors	Notes
"Campylognathus"	Valid	Plieninger	preoccupied name; now known as Campylognathoides

== Synapsids ==
=== Non-mammalian ===
Name	Status	Authors	Age	Location	Notes	Images
Thrinaxodon	Valid	Seeley	248 Millions of years ago	Antarctica; South Africa	One of the earliest cynodonts.	Thrinaxodon
