= 1896 in paleontology =

Paleontology or palaeontology is the study of prehistoric life forms on Earth through the examination of plant and animal fossils. This includes the study of body fossils, tracks (ichnites), burrows, cast-off parts, fossilised feces (coprolites), palynomorphs and chemical residues. Because humans have encountered fossils for millennia, paleontology has a long history both before and after becoming formalized as a science. This article records significant discoveries and events related to paleontology that occurred or were published in the year 1896.

== Anapsids ==
=== Newly named turtles ===
Name	Novelty	Status	Authors	Age	Location	Notes	Images
Archelon	Gen et sp nov	Valid	Wieland	Late Cretaceous	USA; South Dakota	A protostegid giant sea turtle.	Archelon
