= 1898 in paleontology =

Paleontology or palaeontology is the study of prehistoric life forms on Earth through the examination of plant and animal fossils. This includes the study of body fossils, tracks (ichnites), burrows, cast-off parts, fossilised feces (coprolites), palynomorphs and chemical residues. Because humans have encountered fossils for millennia, paleontology has a long history both before and after becoming formalized as a science. This article records significant discoveries and events related to paleontology that occurred or were published in the year 1898.

== Dinosaurs ==
Name	Status	Authors	Notes
Avalonia	Preoccupied	Harry Govier Seeley	Misidentified non-dinosaurian archosaur preoccupied by Walcott, 1889. Later renamed Avalonianus.
Clasmodosaurus	Nomen dubium	Ameghino	
Loncosaurus	Nomen dubium	Ameghino	
Picrodon	Misidentification.	Harry Govier Seeley	Misidentified genus of dubious non-dinosaurian archosaur. May be a synonym of Avalonianus.

== Plesiosaurs ==
=== New taxa ===
Name	Status	Authors	Notes
Megalneusaurus	Valid	Knight	

== Synapsids ==
=== Non-mammalian ===
Name	Status	Authors	Age	Unit	Location	Notes	Images
Aulacocephalodon	Valid	Seeley					Aulacocephalodon
Aulacephalodon	Valid	Seeley					Aulacocephalodon
Rhachiocephalus	Valid	Seeley					Aulacocephalodon
