= 1910 in paleontology =

Paleontology or palaeontology is the study of prehistoric life forms on Earth through the examination of plant and animal fossils. This includes the study of body fossils, tracks (ichnites), burrows, cast-off parts, fossilised feces (coprolites), palynomorphs and chemical residues. Because humans have encountered fossils for millennia, paleontology has a long history both before and after becoming formalized as a science. This article records significant discoveries and events related to paleontology that occurred or were published in the year 1910.

== Arthropoda ==
=== Newly named insects ===
Name	Novelty	Status	Authors	Age	Unit	Location	Notes	Images
Agroecomyrmex	Gen et comb nov	Valid	Wheeler	Lutetian	Baltic amber	Europe	An agroecomyrmecine ant, Moved from "Myrmica" duisburgi	Agroecomyrmex duisburgi
Aphrophora angusta	Sp nov	valid	Handlirsch	Eocene; Ypresian	Eocene Okanagan Highlands; Allenby Formation	Canada; British Columbia	A spittlebug	Aphrophora angusta (1910 illustration)
Archiinocellia	Gen et sp nov	valid	Handlirsch	Eocene; Ypresian	Eocene Okanagan Highlands "Horsefly shales"	Canada; British Columbia	A Raphidiid snakefly Type species A. oligoneura	Archiinocellia oligoneura (1910 illustration)
Archiraphidia	Gen et comb nov	valid	Handlirsch	Priabonian	Florissant Formation	United States; Colorado	A Raphidiid snakefly The type species is Inocellia tumulata (1890) also includes Inocellia somnolenta (1890); Raphidia tranquilla (1890)	Archiraphidia tumulata
Dictyoraphidia veterana	Gen et comb nov	valid	Handlirsch	Priabonian	Florissant Formation	United States; Colorado	A baissopterid snakefly New genus for "Inocellia" veterana (1890)	
Electromyrmex	Gen et sp nov	nom nudum	Wheeler	Lutetian	Baltic amber	Europe	A myrmicine ant. Type species E. klebsi	Electromyrmex klebsi
Garrus defuncta	Sp nov	jr synonym	Handlirsch	Eocene; Ypresian	Eocene Okanagan Highlands; Coldwater Beds	Canada; British Columbia	A gerrid water strider Moved to Telmatrechus defunctus (1998)	Telmatrechus defunctus (1910 illustration)
Garrus stali	Comb nov	jr synonym	(Scudder) Handlirsch	Eocene; Ypresian	Eocene Okanagan Highlands; Allenby Formation	Canada; British Columbia	A gerrid water strider Moved from Telmatrechus defunctus (1890); Moved back to Telmatrechus defunctus (1998)	Telmatrechus stali (1890 illustration)
Microphorus defunctus	Sp nov	jr synonym	Handlirsch	Eocene; Ypresian	Eocene Okanagan Highlands; Allenby Formation	Canada; British Columbia	A long legged fly Moved to Microphor defunctus (1994)	Microphor defunctus (1910 illustration)
Penthetria angustipennis	Sp nov	jr synonym	Handlirsch	Eocene; Ypresian	Eocene Okanagan Highlands "Horsefly shales"	Canada; British Columbia	A bibionid fly Moved to Plecia angustipennis (1959)	Plecia angustipennis
Penthetria avunculus	Sp nov	jr synonym	Handlirsch	Eocene; Ypresian	Eocene Okanagan Highlands; Allenby Formation	Canada; British Columbia	A bibionid fly Jr synonym of Plecia curtula (1959)	Plecia curtula
Penthetria avus	Sp nov	jr synonym	Handlirsch	Eocene; Ypresian	Eocene Okanagan Highlands; Allenby Formation	Canada; British Columbia	A bibionid fly Moved to Plecia avus (1959)	Plecia avus
Penthetria brevipes	Sp nov	jr synonym	Handlirsch	Eocene; Ypresian	Eocene Okanagan Highlands; Allenby Formation	Canada; British Columbia	A bibionid fly Jr synonym of Plecia pulla (1959)	Plecia pulla
Penthetria canadensis	Sp nov	jr synonym	Handlirsch	Eocene; Ypresian	Eocene Okanagan Highlands; Allenby Formation	Canada; British Columbia	A bibionid fly Moved to Plecia canadensis (1959)	Plecia canadensis
Penthetria curtula	Sp nov	jr synonym	Handlirsch	Eocene; Ypresian	Eocene Okanagan Highlands "Horsefly shales"	Canada; British Columbia	A bibionid fly Moved to Plecia curtula (1959)	Plecia curtula
Penthetria dilatata	Sp nov	jr synonym	Handlirsch	Eocene; Ypresian	Eocene Okanagan Highlands "Horsefly shales"	Canada; British Columbia	A bibionid fly Moved to Plecia dilatata (1959)	Plecia dilatata
Penthetria elatior	Sp nov	jr synonym	Handlirsch	Eocene; Ypresian	Eocene Okanagan Highlands; Allenby Formation	Canada; British Columbia	A bibionid fly Moved to Plecia elatior (1959)	Plecia elatior
Penthetria falcatula	Sp nov	jr synonym	Handlirsch	Eocene; Ypresian	Eocene Okanagan Highlands; Allenby Formation	Canada; British Columbia	A bibionid fly Jr synonym of Plecia transitoria (1959)	Plecia transitoria
Penthetria fragmentum	Sp nov	jr synonym	Handlirsch	Eocene; Ypresian	Eocene Okanagan Highlands; Allenby Formation	Canada; British Columbia	A bibionid fly Jr synonym of Plecia transitoria (1959)	Plecia transitoria
Penthetria lambei	Sp nov	jr synonym	Handlirsch	Eocene; Ypresian	Eocene Okanagan Highlands; Allenby Formation	Canada; British Columbia	A bibionid fly Jr synonym of Plecia pictipennis (1959)	Plecia pictipennis
Penthetria nana	Sp nov	jr synonym	Handlirsch	Eocene; Ypresian	Eocene Okanagan Highlands; Allenby Formation	Canada; British Columbia	A bibionid fly Moved to Plecia nana (1959)	Plecia nana
Penthetria ovalis	Sp nov	jr synonym	Handlirsch	Eocene; Ypresian	Eocene Okanagan Highlands; Allenby Formation	Canada; British Columbia	A bibionid fly Jr synonym of Plecia pictipennis (1959)	Plecia pictipennis
Penthetria pictipennis	Sp nov	jr synonym	Handlirsch	Eocene; Ypresian	Eocene Okanagan Highlands; Allenby Formation	Canada; British Columbia	A bibionid fly Moved to Plecia pictipennis (1959)	Plecia pictipennis
Penthetria platyptera	Sp nov	jr synonym	Handlirsch	Eocene; Ypresian	Eocene Okanagan Highlands "Horsefly shales"	Canada; British Columbia	A bibionid fly Moved to Plecia platyptera (1959)	Plecia platyptera
Penthetria pulchra	Sp nov	jr synonym	Handlirsch	Eocene; Ypresian	Eocene Okanagan Highlands; Allenby Formation	Canada; British Columbia	A bibionid fly Moved to Plecia pulchra (1959)	Plecia pulchra
Penthetria pulla	Sp nov	jr synonym	Handlirsch	Eocene; Ypresian	Eocene Okanagan Highlands; Allenby Formation	Canada; British Columbia	A bibionid fly Moved to Plecia pulla (1959)	Plecia pulla
Penthetria reducta	Sp nov	jr synonym	Handlirsch	Eocene; Ypresian	Eocene Okanagan Highlands "Horsefly shales"	Canada; British Columbia	A bibionid fly Moved to Plecia reducta (1959)	Plecia reducta (1910 illustration)
Penthetria separanda	Sp nov	jr synonym	Handlirsch	Eocene; Ypresian	Eocene Okanagan Highlands; Allenby Formation	Canada; British Columbia	A bibionid fly Jr synonym of Plecia pictipennis (1959)	Plecia pictipennis
Penthetria transitoria	Sp nov	jr synonym	Handlirsch	Eocene; Ypresian	Eocene Okanagan Highlands "Horsefly shales"	Canada; British Columbia	A bibionid fly Moved to Plecia transitoria (1959)	Plecia transitoria
Promastax	Gen et sp nov	valid	Handlirsch	Eocene; Ypresian	Eocene Okanagan Highlands "Horsefly shales"	Canada; British Columbia	A Promastacid grasshopper Type species P. archaicus	Promastax archaicus (1910 illustration)
Tipula tulameena	Sp nov	valid	Handlirsch	Eocene; Ypresian	Eocene Okanagan Highlands; Allenby Formation	Canada; British Columbia	A tipuline Crane fly.	Tipula tulameena (1910 illustration)
Xylonomus lambei	Sp nov	jr synonym	Handlirsch	Eocene; Ypresian	Eocene Okanagan Highlands; Allenby Formation	Canada; British Columbia	A xoridine ichneumon parasitic wasp. moved to Xorides lambei.	Xorides lambei (1910 illustration)

== Archosauromorphs ==
- AMNH 5244, a ceratopsian braincase, was found isolated during an American Museum of Natural History Barnum Brown-led expedition.

=== Newly named phytosaurs ===
Name	Status	Authors	Age	Unit	Location	Notes	Images
Mesorhinus	Preoccupied	Jaekel	possibly Late Triassic	unknown	Germany	Preoccupied by Mesorhinus Ameghino, 1885; renamed Mesorhinosuchus Kuhn, 1961.	
Metarhinus	Preoccupied	Jaekel	Late Triassic (Norian)	Chinle Formation	United States	New genus for "Belodon" buceros Cope, 1881; preoccupied by Metarhinus Osborn, 1908; renamed Machaeroprosopus Mehl in Mehl, Toepemann, and Schwartz, 1916	

=== Newly named basal dinosauriforms ===
Name	Status	Authors	Age	Unit	Location	Notes	Images
Saltopus	Valid taxon	Friedrich von Huene	Late Triassic (Carnian)	Lossiemouth Sandstone	Scotland	Probably a non-dinosaurian dinosauriforme.	

=== Dinosaurs ===
Taxon	Novelty	Status	Author(s)	Age	Unit	Location	Notes	Images
Euoplocephalus	Gen. nov.	Valid	Lambe	Campanian	Dinosaur Park Formation	Alberta	An ankylosaurine ankylosaurid	
Hecatasaurus	Gen. nov.	Jr. synonym	Brown	Maastrichtian	Sânpetru Formation	Romania	New genus name for Limnosaurus transsylvanicus, already named Telmatosaurus	
Kritosaurus	Gen. et sp. nov.	Valid	Brown	Campanian	Kirtland Formation	New Mexico	A hadrosaurid	
"Nectosaurus navajovius"		Nomen nudum	Versluys	Campanian	Kirtland Formation	New Mexico	An unpublished name for Kritosaurus navajovius mentioned in passing attributed to Brown	

== Synapsids ==
=== Non-mammalian ===
Name	Status	Authors	Age	Unit	Location	Notes	Images
Aloposaurus	Valid	Robert Broom	Middle Permian	Pristerognathus Assemblage Zone	South Africa	A member of Gorgonopsidae.	Galepus skull
Galepus	Valid	Broom	Late Permian	Cistecephalus Assemblage Zone	South Africa	A member of Galeopsidae.	Galepus skull
Poecilospondylus	Junior synonym	Ermin Cowles Case	Early Permian	Arroyo Formation	US	A junior synonym of the pelycosaur Varanosaurus.	Galepus skull

=== Mammalian ===
Name	Novelty	Status	Authors	Age	Unit	Location	Notes	Images
Lophiaspis	Gen. et. sp. nov.	Valid	Depéret	Early Eocene		France	A lophiodontid, the type species is L. maurettei. Also includes new species L. baicherei and L. occitanicus, the latter originally named as Palaeotherium occitanicum in 1812.	
Pseudaelurus chinjiensis			Pilgrim	Tertiary		India		
