= 1905 in paleontology =

Paleontology or palaeontology is the study of prehistoric life forms on Earth through the examination of plant and animal fossils. This includes the study of body fossils, tracks (ichnites), burrows, cast-off parts, fossilised feces (coprolites), palynomorphs and chemical residues. Because humans have encountered fossils for millennia, paleontology has a long history both before and after becoming formalized as a science. This article records significant discoveries and events related to paleontology that occurred or were published in the year 1905.

== Arthropods ==
=== Newly named crustaceans ===
| Name | Novelty | Status | Authors | Age | Unit | Location | Notes | Images |
|---|---|---|---|---|---|---|---|---|
| Archaeolepas decora | Sp nov | Jr synonym | Harbort | Early Cretaceous (Valanginian) | | Germany | A barnacle, moved to the genus Loriolepas in 2016. | |
| Astacus antiquus | Sp nov | Jr synonym | Harbort | Early Cretaceous | Bückeberg Formation | Germany | Moved to the genus Protastacus in 1983. | |
| Eryma sulcatum | Sp nov | Valid | Harbort | | | Germany | An erymid. | |
| Hoploparia aspera | Sp nov | Valid | Harbort | | | Germany | A lobster. | |
| Meyeria rapax | Sp nov | Jr synonym | Harbort | Early Cretaceous | | Germany | Moved to the genus Atherfieldastacus in 2017. | |

== Archosauromorphs ==
=== Newly named dinosaurs ===
Data courtesy of George Olshevsky's dinosaur genera list.

| Name | Status | Authors | Age | Unit | Location | Notes | Images |
|---|---|---|---|---|---|---|---|
| Albertosaurus | Valid taxon | Henry Fairfield Osborn | Late Cretaceous (Edmontonian) | Horseshoe Canyon Formation | Canada (Alberta | An albertosaurine tyrannosaurid. | Albertosaurus |
| "Diceratops" | Preoccupied. | Lull vide: Hatcher | Late Cretaceous (Lancian) | US | Has been considered a member of Triceratops, but recent work has indicated it deserved its own genus after all. In 2008 it was renamed Diceratus because Diceratops was preoccupied by a hymenopteran insect Foerster, 1868. | | |
| "Dynamosaurus" | Junior synonym. | Henry Fairfield Osborn | Late Cretaceous (Lancian) | Lance Formation | | Same as Tyrannosaurus, this name was rejected because Tyrannosaurus was mentioned earlier in the paper. | |
| Stegopelta | Valid taxon | Williston | Middle Cretaceous (Cenomanian) | Frontier Formation | United States (Wyoming) | A nodosaurid. | |
| Tyrannosaurus | Valid taxon | Henry Fairfield Osborn | Late Cretaceous (Lancian) | Lance Formation; Hell Creek Formation; Scollard Formation; North Horn Formation; McRae Formation; Frenchman Formation; Denver Formation; Laramie Formation | Canada (Saskatchewan); Mexico; United States (Colorado, Montana, New Mexico, South Dakota, and Wyoming) | Tyrannosaurus is the largest recognized tyrannosauroid and the most famous dinosaur of all time. | Tyrannosaurus |

=== Other archosauromorphs ===
| Name | Status | Authors | Age | Unit | Location | Notes | Images |
|---|---|---|---|---|---|---|---|
| "Procerosaurus" | Preoccupied. | Fritsch | Late Cretaceous (Turonian) | | | Preoccupied by Procerosaurus von Huene, 1902; later renamed Ponerosteus Olshevsky, 2000. Either a bird or pterosaur. | |

== Synapsids ==
=== Non-mammalian ===
| Name | Status | Authors | Age | Unit | Location | Notes | Images |
|---|---|---|---|---|---|---|---|
| Archaeosuchus | Nomen dubium | Broom | Middle Permian | | | A member of Dinocephalia. | |
| Melinodon | junior synonym | Broom | Middle Triassic (late Olenekian to Anisian) | Burgersdorp Formation | South Africa | | |
| Sesamodon | junior synonym | Broom | Middle Triassic (late Olenekian to Anisian) | Burgersdorp Formation | South Africa | | Sesamodon |

== Other reptiles ==
| Name | Status | Authors | Age | Unit | Location | Notes | Images |
|---|---|---|---|---|---|---|---|
| Albisaurus | Nomen dubium. | Fritsch | Late Cretaceous (Turonian) | Jizera Formation | Czech Republic | May have been a misidentified marine reptile. | |
