= 1901 in paleontology =

Paleontology or palaeontology is the study of prehistoric life forms on Earth through the examination of plant and animal fossils. This includes the study of body fossils, tracks (ichnites), burrows, cast-off parts, fossilised feces (coprolites), palynomorphs and chemical residues. Because humans have encountered fossils for millennia, paleontology has a long history both before and after becoming formalized as a science. This article records significant discoveries and events related to paleontology that occurred or were published in the year 1901.

== Archosauromorphs ==
=== Newly named dinosaurs ===
Data courtesy of George Olshevsky's dinosaur genera list.

| Name | Novelty | Status | Authors | Age | Unit | Location | Notes | Images |
|---|---|---|---|---|---|---|---|---|
| Genyodectes serus | Gen. et sp. nov. | Valid | Arthur Smith Woodward | Early Cretaceous | Cerro Barcino Formation | Argentina | A ceratosaurid theropod. The type species is Genyodectes serus, and it is known from a partial snout. | |

== Mammals ==
=== Eutherians ===
==== Cetaceans ====
| Name | Novelty | Status | Authors | Age | Unit | Location | Notes | Images |
|---|---|---|---|---|---|---|---|---|
| Aulocetus sammarinensis | sp nov | Valid | Giovanni Capellini | middle Miocene (Serravallian) | Fumaiolo Formation | San Marino | A member of Cetotheriidae. Type species of Titanocetus Bisconti, 2006. | Titanocetus |
