= 1913 in paleontology =

Paleontology or palaeontology is the study of prehistoric life forms on Earth through the examination of plant and animal fossils. This includes the study of body fossils, tracks (ichnites), burrows, cast-off parts, fossilised feces (coprolites), palynomorphs and chemical residues. Because humans have encountered fossils for millennia, paleontology has a long history both before and after becoming formalized as a science. This article records significant discoveries and events related to paleontology that occurred or were published in the year 1913.

== Insects ==
Name	Novelty	Status	Authors	Age	Unit	Location	Notes	Images
Leucotermes robustus	sp. nov	Synonym	von Rosen	Lutetian	Baltic amber	Europe	A Stylotermitid termite. synonym of Parastylotermes robustus	
Protosmylus picta	Gen et comb. nov	Synonym	(Hagen)	Priabonian	Baltic amber	Europe	A protosmyline Osmylid lance lacewing Moved from "Osmylus" picta (1856) moved to Osmylidia picta (2021)	

== Vertebrates ==
=== Synapsids ===
Name	Status	Authors	Age	Unit	Location	Notes	Images
Diictodon	Valid	Robert Broom	Middle Permian	Pristerognathus zone	China; South Africa; Zambia	A dicynodont belonging to Pylaecephalidae, living in burrows.	Diictodon
Eocyclops	Junior synonym	Robert Broom	Late Permian			Junior synonym of Rhachiocephalus.	
Ictidorhinus	Valid	Broom	Late Permian	Dicynodon assemblage zone	South Africa	A biarmosuchian.	
Scylacops	Valid	Broom	Late Permian	Cistecephalus assemblage zone	South Africa	A member of Gorgonopsia.	

=== Crocodylomorphs ===
Name	Status	Authors	Age	Location	Notes	Images
Aggiosaurus	Valid	Ambayrac	157 million years ago	France	A geosaurine metriorhynchid.	

=== Plesiosaurs ===
Name	Status	Authors	Location	Images
Leurospondylus	Valid	Brown	Canada (Alberta)	
Ogmodirus	Valid	Williston Moodie	USA (Kansas)	

=== Dinosaurs ===
- April: William Edmund Cutler prospected in Dinosaur Provincial Park. His work was underwritten by the Calgary Syndicate for Prehistoric Research, a group of local philanthropist businessmen, and a small local museum, the Calgary Public Museum, which no long exists.
- Summer: The American Museum of Natural History dispatched a team of fossil hunters to Dinosaur Provincial Park. Cutler joined the expedition but was "asked to leave" after only a few months of involvement.
- Cutler excavated a juvenile Gryposaurus now catalogued by the Canadian Museum of Nature as CMN 8784. The site of the excavation has since been designated "quarry 252".
- Winter: Cutler partly prepared the young Gryposaurus specimen, possibly in Calgary while working on dinosaurs for Euston Sisely.
- A US Geological Survey crew headed by Eugene Stebinger and a US National Museum crew headed by Charles Gilmore worked together to excavate the first dinosaur discovery of the Two Medicine Formation.

==== New taxa ====
Taxon	Novelty	Status	Author(s)	Age	Unit	Location	Notes	Images
Elopteryx nopcsai	Gen. et sp. nov.	Nomen dubium	Andrews	Maastrichtian	Sânpetru Formation	Romania	Either a bird or a troodontid	
Hypacrosaurus altispinus	Gen. et sp. nov.	Valid	Brown	Maastrichtian	Horseshoe Canyon Formation	Alberta	A hadrosaurid	
Procompsognathus triassicus	Gen. et sp. nov.	Valid	Fraas	Norian	Löwenstein Formation	Germany	A coelophysoid	
Pterospondylus trielbae	Gen. et sp. nov.	Nomen dubium	Jaekel	Norian	Trossingen Formation	Germany	A coelophysoid	
Styracosaurus albertensis	Gen. et sp. nov.	Valid	Lambe	Campanian	Dinosaur Park Formation	Alberta	A ceratopsid	
Thescelosaurus neglectus	Gen. et sp. nov.	Valid	Gilmore	Maastrichtian	Lance Formation	Wyoming	An ornithopod	
