= Ichnites =

Trace fossil classification
- Ichnogenus: †Ichnites

Dinosaur footprint

Ichnites is an ichnogenus of dinosaur footprint.

== See also ==
- List of dinosaur ichnogenera
