= Animal track =

Ground imprint from animal movement

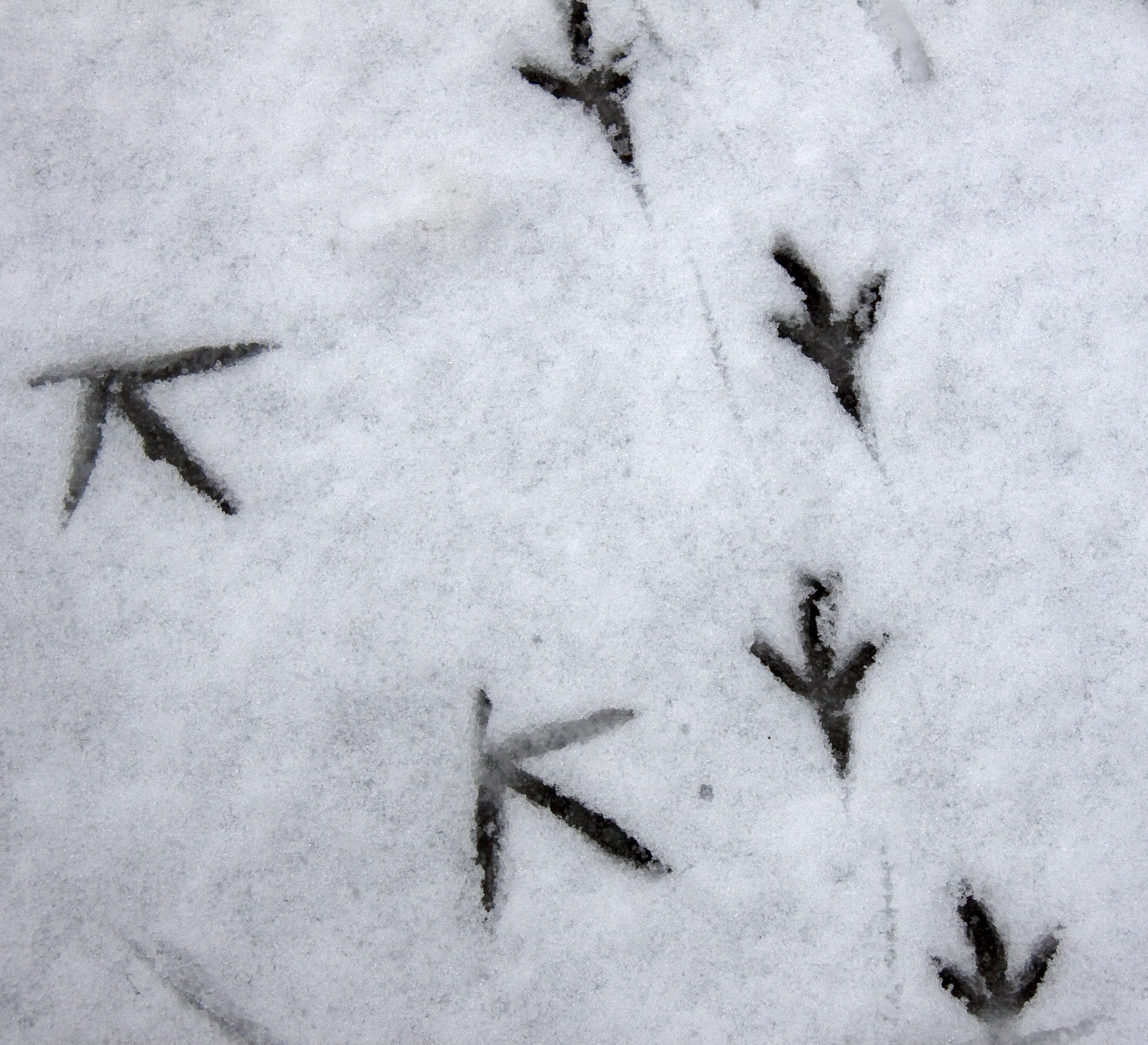
Bird tracks in snow.

An animal track, in some cases known as a pugmark, or an animal footprint, is an imprint left behind in soil, snow, or mud, or on some other ground surface, by an animal walking across it. Animal tracks are used by hunters in tracking their prey, by naturalists to identify animals living in a given area, and fossil tracks are used by paleontologists to study ancient fauna.

== Archaeology and Paleontology ==
Foot tracks of ancient and extinct creatures, notably dinosaurs, that have been fossilized are of immense importance in archaeology and paleontology to understand the lives and behavior of such creatures.

== See also ==
- Flukeprint, track of whale on ocean surface
- Footprint
- Pugmark
- Spoor (animal)
