= 1937 in paleontology =

List of years in paleontology	(table)
- … 1927; 1928; 1929; 1930; 1931; 1932; 1933; 1934; 1935; 1936; 1937; 1938; 1939; 1940; 1941; 1942; 1943; 1944; 1945; 1946; 1947 …
- In science 1934 1935 1936 1937 1938 1939 1940
- Art; Archaeology; Architecture; Literature; Music; Philosophy; Science; +...

Paleontology or palaeontology is the study of prehistoric life forms on Earth through the examination of plant and animal fossils. This includes the study of body fossils, tracks (ichnites), burrows, cast-off parts, fossilised feces (coprolites), palynomorphs and chemical residues. Because humans have encountered fossils for millennia, paleontology has a long history both before and after becoming formalized as a science. This article records significant discoveries and events related to paleontology that occurred or were published in the year 1937.

== Plants ==
=== Ferns and fern allies ===
Name	Novelty	Status	Authors	Age	Unit	Location	Synonymized taxa	Notes	Images
Equisetum alexanderi	Sp nov		Brown	Miocene; Langhian	Latah Formation	USA; Washington		A horsetail species.	

=== Flowering plants ===
==== Magnoliids ====
Name	Novelty	Status	Authors	Age	Unit	Location	Synonymized taxa	Notes	Images
Machilus americana	Sp nov		Brown	Miocene; Langhian	Latah Formation	USA; Washington		A Machilus species.	
Machilus asiminoides	Sp nov		Brown	Miocene; Langhian	Latah Formation	USA; Washington		A Machilus species.	
Magnolia latahensis	Comb nov		(Berry) Brown	Miocene; Langhian	Latah Formation	USA; Washington	synonymy: Magnolia sp. of Knowlton (1926); Magnolia californica auct. non Lesquereux, nec Berry, 1929	A Magnolia species. Moved from Apocynophyllum latahense (1929)	

==== Monocots ====
Name	Novelty	Status	Authors	Age	Unit	Location	Synonymized taxa	Notes	Images
Smilax magna	Syn nov		Chaney	Miocene	Eagle Creek Formation	USA; Oregon	Aristolochia whitebirdensis (1932); Smilax lamarensis non Knowlton nec Berry 1929	A greenbriar species.	

==== Basal Eudicots and unplaced core Eudicots ====
Name	Novelty	Status	Authors	Age	Unit	Location	Synonymized taxa	Notes	Images
Tetracera spokanensis	Sp nov	jr synonym	Brown	Miocene; Langhian	Latah Formation	USA; Washington		First described as a Tetracera species. Moved to Castanopsis spokanensis (1959)	
Vitis washingtonensis	Comb nov		(Knowlton) Brown	Miocene; Langhian	Latah Formation	USA; Washington	synonymy: Acer merriami Auct non. Knowlton. nec Knowlton, (1926); Acer sp. Berry, (1929); Cercis idahoensis p.p. Berry, (1930); Cercis idahoensis p.p. Berry, (1934); Menispermites latahensis Berry, (1929); Populus lindgreni Auct non. Knowlton. nec Knowlton, (1926); Populus lindgreni Auct non. Knowlton. nec Berry, (1934)	A grape species Moved from Populus washingtonensis (1926)	Vitis washingtonensis

==== Superasterids - basal ====
Name	Novelty	Status	Authors	Age	Unit	Location	Notes	Images	
Philadelphus pardeei	Comb nov		(Knowlton) Brown	Miocene; Langhian	Latah Formation	USA; Washington	Phyllites peculiaris Knowlton (1926)	A Philadelphus species. Moved from Phyllites pardeei (1926)	Philadelphus pardeei
Vaccinium sophoroides	Comb nov		(Knowlton) Brown	Miocene; Langhian	Latah Formation	USA; Washington	synonymy: Arctostaphylos knowltoni Berry (1929); Cassia sophoroides (Knowlton) Berry (1929) p.p.; Diospyros princetonia non Cockerell nec Berry (1929); Salix perplexa Knowlton (1926) p.p.	A Vaccinium species. Moved from Phyllites sophoroides (1926)	Vaccinium sophoroides

==== Superasterids ====
Name	Novelty	Status	Authors	Age	Unit	Location	Synonymized taxa	Notes	Images
Aralia republicensis	Nom nov.	jr synonym	Brown	Eocene; Ypresian	Okanagan Highlands; Klondike Mountain Formation	USA; Washington	Aralia whitneyi non Lesquereux nec Berry, (1929); Platanus appendiculata non Lesquereux nec Berry, (1929)	First named as an Aralia species. A new name for Republic flora fossils A jr synonym of Macginitiea gracilis (1987)	Macginitiea gracilis
Arbutus idahoensis	Comb nov		(Knowlton) Brown	Miocene	Payette Formation	USA; Idaho	synonymy: Arbutus traini MacGinitie (1933); Arbutus sp. of Chaney (1925) p.p.; Betula aequalis non Lesquereux nec Knowlton (1898); Celastrus lacoei non Lesquereux nec Berry (1929); Laurus princeps non Heer nec Berry (1929); Myrica lanceolata Knowlton (1898) p.p.	An Arbutus species. Moved from Myrica? idahoensis (1898)	
Hydrangea fraxinifolia	Comb nov		(Berry) Brown	Eocene; Priabonian	Florissant Formation	USA; Colorado	synonymy: Magnolia sp. of Knowlton (1926); Fraxinus heerii Lesquereux, 1878; Fraxinus praedicta auct. non Heer, nec Lesquereux, 1878; Juglans affinis Kirchner, 1898; Hydrangea florissantia Cockerell, 1908	A Hydrangea species. Moved from Celastrus fraxinifolius (1883)	
Mahonia reticulata	Comb nov		(MacGinitie) Brown	Miocene	Strawberry Volcanics "Blue Mountains flora"	USA; Oregon	synonymy: Odostemon hollicki auct. non Dorf. nec. MacGinitie (1933); Mahonia hollicki (Dorf) Arnold (1936)	An Oregon grape species. Moved from Clematis reticulata (1933)	
Viburnum fernquisti	Comb nov		(Berry) Brown	Miocene; Langhian	Latah Formation	USA; Washington		A viburnum species. Moved from Ribes fernquisti (1929)	
Viburnum lantanafolium	Syn nov		Berry	Miocene; Langhian	Latah Formation	USA; Washington	Aesculus hesperia Berry (1929)	A viburnum species. One species synonymized in.	

==== Superrosids ====
Name	Novelty	Status	Authors	Age	Unit	Location	Synonymized taxa	Notes	Images
Acer bendirei	Syn nov		Lesquereux	Miocene	Mascall Formation	USA; Oregon	synonymy: Acer dimorphum Lesquereux (1888); Acer medianum Knowlton (1902); Acer minor Knowlton (1902) p.p.; Acer oregonianum Knowlton (1902) p.p.; Acer osmonti Lesquereux (1888) p.p. non Kirchner nec Berry (1934); Cf. Quercus pseudolyrata non Lesquereux nec Knowlton (1926)	A maple species. A number of occurrences synonymized in.	
Acer osmonti	Syn nov		Knowlton	Eocene	John Day Formation "Bridge Creek Flora"	USA; Oregon	synonymy: Acer chaneyi Knowlton (1926); Acer florissanti non Kirchner nec Berry (1934); Acer gigas Knowlton (1902); Cf. Quercus pseudolyrata non Lesquereux nec Knowlton (1926); Acer oregonianum auct. non Knowlton nec. Berry (1934)	A maple species. A number of occurrences synonymized in.	
Alnus carpinoides	Syn nov		Lesquereux	Eocene	John Day Formation "Bridge Creek flora"	USA; Oregon	Alnus prerhombifolia Berry (1929); Betula thor Knowlton 1926)	An alder species. Two species synonymized in.	Alnus relatus
Alnus relatus	Comb nov		(Knowlton) Brown	Miocene; Langhian	Latah Formation	USA; Washington	synonymy: Betula elliptica auct. non Saporta nec Lesquereux (1883); Betula heteromorpha auct. non Knowlton nec. Brooks (1935); Prunus rustii auct. non Knowlton nec. Berry (1929)	An alder species. Moved from Phyllites relatus (1926)	Alnus relatus
Betula fairii	Comb nov		Brown	Miocene; Langhian	Latah Formation	USA; Washington	synonymy: Betula bryani Knowlton 1926; Betula heteromorpha Knowlton 1926 p.p.; Betula largei Knowlton 1926	A birch species. Three species synonymized in	Betula fairii
Betula vera	Sp nov		Brown	Miocene; Langhian	Latah Formation	USA; Washington		A birch species.	
Carya simulata	Comb nov		(Knowlton) Brown	Miocene	Mascall Formation	USA; Oregon		A hickory species. Moved from Aesculus simulata (1902)	
Cotinus fraterna	Syn nov		(Lesquereux) Cockerell	Eocene; Priabonian	Florissant Formation	USA; Colorado	Andromeda delicatula Lesquereux (1888)	A cotton-easter species. One species synonymized in.	
Dilodendron boreale	Sp nov		Brown	Miocene; Langhian	Latah Formation	USA; Washington		A sapindaceous species.	
Dipteronia insignis	Comb nov	Jr synonym	(Lesquereux) Brown	Eocene; Priabonian	Florissant Formation	USA; Colorado	synonymy: Comptonia acutiloba (Lesquereux) Cockerell (1906); Rhus subrhomboidalis Lesquereux (1883)	A sapindaceous species. Moved from Comptonia insignis (1906); First named Myrica insignis (1874); Moved to Bohlenia insignis (1987)	
Fagus washoensis	Syn nov		LaMotte	Miocene	Cedarville Formation	USA; Nevada	Amygdalus alexanderi Berry (1929)	A beech species. One species synonymized in.	
Paliurus florissanti	Syn nov		Lesquereux	Eocene; Priabonian	Florissant Formation	USA; Colorado	Acalypha myricina Cockerell (1909)	A rhamnaceous species. Acalypha myricina (1909) synonymized in	
Pterocarya mixta	Comb nov		(Knowlton) Brown	Miocene	Mascall Formation	USA; Oregon		A wingnut species. Moved from Salix mixta (1902)	
Salix spokanensis	Comb et syn nov		(Berry) Brown	Miocene; Langhian	Latah Formation	USA; Washington	Vaccinium spokanense (1929)	A willow species. Moved from Rhamnus spokanensis (1929)	Salix spokanensis
Zelkova oregoniana	Comb nov		(Knowlton) Brown	Miocene; Langhian	Latah Formation	USA; Washington	synonymy: Fagopsis longifolia auct. non (Lesquereux) Hollick nec. Berry (1929); Ulmus fernquisti Knowlton (1926)	A Zelkova species. Moved from Myrica oregoniana (1902)	

==== Angiosperms - other ====
Name	Novelty	Status	Authors	Age	Unit	Location	Synonymized taxa	Notes	Images
Carpites boraginoides	Comb nov	valid?	Knowlton	Miocene; Langhian	Latah Formation; Coeur d'Alene Florule	Carpolithus hibiscoides Brown (1935)	USA; Idaho	A fruit or seed of uncertain affinity One species synonymized in Suggested to possibly be boraginaceous or malvaceous	Carpites boraginoides

== Arthropods ==
=== Insects ===
Name	Novelty	Status	Authors	Age	Unit	Location	Notes	Images
Protrogosita	Gen et sp nov	valid	Piton & Théobald	Thanetian	Menat Formation	France	A Trogossitid bark gnawing beetle	Protrogosita distincta

== Vertebrates ==
=== Dinosaurs ===
Name	Novelty	Status	Authors	Age	Type locality	Location	Notes	Images
"Bactrosaurus prynadai"		Nomen nudum	Riabinin	Santonian	Dabrazinskaya Svita	Kazakhstan	A species of Bactrosaurus, formally described in 1939	
"Jaxartosaurus"		Nomen nudum	Riabinin	Santonian	Dabrazinskaya Svita	Kazakhstan	A hadrosaurid, formally described in 1939	
Parksosaurus	Gen. nov.	Valid	Sternberg	Maastrichtian	Horseshoe Canyon Formation	Canada	A new genus name for Thescelosaurus warreni	

=== Synapsids ===
Name	Status	Authors	Age	Location	Notes	Images
Cyonosaurus	Valid	Olson	255 Millions of years ago	South Africa	A Gorgonopsian.	Cyonosaurus
Micrictodon	Junior Synonym				Junior Synonym of Thrinaxodon.	
Moschoides	Valid					
Myctosuchus	Valid					
Newtonella	Valid					
Nitosaurus	Valid					
Procynosuchus	Valid	Broom	255 Millions of years ago	Germany; Russia; South Africa; Tanzania	One of the Earliest-Known Cynodonts.	Procynosuchus
Sinokannemeyeria	Valid	Young	245 Millions of years ago	China	A Chinese Kannemeyerid Dicynodont.	Sinokannemeyeria

== Popular culture ==
=== Amusement parks and attractions ===
- August 28th: The Calgary Zoo's Prehistoric Park opened. Paleontologist Darren Tanke has described Prehistoric Park as "an extensive treed park and pathways containing numerous life-sized concrete dinosaurs and other prehistoric life". It also had "two long, walkthrough display buildings containing a Corythosaurus skeleton and individual dinosaur bones", as well as exhibits of paleozoic invertebrates and prehistoric plants. It became a popular attraction among visitors to the zoo.

=== Literature ===
- In 1937, Morant imagined a feathered dinosaur-like animal that lived during the Triassic and glided about on four wings. This portrayal reflected contemporary scientific speculations attempting to reconstruct the hypothetical ancestor of birds. Fossils from China later revealed the existence of just this sort of animal.
