= 1929 in paleontology =

Paleontology or palaeontology is the study of prehistoric life forms on Earth through the examination of plant and animal fossils. This includes the study of body fossils, tracks (ichnites), burrows, cast-off parts, fossilised feces (coprolites), palynomorphs and chemical residues. Because humans have encountered fossils for millennia, paleontology has a long history both before and after becoming formalized as a science. This article records significant discoveries and events related to paleontology that occurred or were published in the year 1929.

== Plants ==
=== Ferns and fern allies ===
Name	Novelty	Status	Authors	Age	Unit	Location	Notes	Images
Asplenium occidentale	Sp nov	Jr synonym	Berry	Miocene; Langhian	Latah Formation	USA; Washington	A spleenwort species. A jr homonym of Asplenium occidentale Knowlton (1917); Moved to Osmunda occidentale (1940)	Osmunda occidentale
Woodsia bonseri	Sp nov		Berry	Miocene; Langhian	Latah Formation	USA; Washington	A woodsia fern species.	Woodsia bonseri
Woodwardia praeradicans	Sp nov		Berry	Miocene; Langhian	Latah Formation	USA; Washington	A chain fern species.	Woodwardia praeradicans

=== Conifers ===
Name	Novelty	Status	Authors	Age	Unit	Location	Notes	Images
Pinus latahensis	Sp nov	Valid	Berry	Eocene; Ypresian	Klondike Mountain Formation	USA; Washington	A 5-needle pine species	Pinus latahensis
Pinus macrophylla	Sp nov	Homonym	Berry	Eocene; Ypresian	Klondike Mountain Formation	USA; Washington	A 3-needle pine species. Jr homonym of Pinus macrophylla Lindley, 1839	Pinus macrophylla
Pinus monticolensis	Sp nov	Valid	Berry	Eocene; Ypresian	Klondike Mountain Formation	USA; Washington	A pine seed morphospecies	Pinus monticolensis
Pinus tetrafolia	Sp nov	nomen dubium	Berry	Eocene; Ypresian	Klondike Mountain Formation	USA; Washington	A punitive 4-needle pine species Noted by Berry as "highly improbable that this should represent a distinct botanic species"	Pinus tetrafolia
Tsuga latahensis	Sp nov	Valid?	Berry	Miocene	Latah Formation	USA; Washington	First described as a hemlock conescale. Suggested to be a bud scale in 1937. Treated as an incertae sedis plant by Chaney & Axelrod (1959).	Tsuga latahensis

=== Angiosperms ===
==== Monocots ====
Name	Novelty	Status	Authors	Age	Unit	Location	Synonymized taxa	Notes	Images
Potamogeton heterophylloides	Sp nov		Berry	Miocene	Latah Formation	USA; Washington		A pondweed species Moved to Keteleeria heterophylloides (1935)	Keteleeria heterophylloides

==== Magnoliids ====
Name	Novelty	Status	Authors	Age	Unit	Location	Synonymized taxa	Notes	Images
Liriodendron hesperia	Sp nov		Berry	Miocene	Latah Formation	USA; Washington		A Liriodendron species	Liriodendron hesperia
Sassafras hesperia	Sp nov		Berry	Eocene; Ypresian	Klondike Mountain Formation	USA; Washington		A Sassafras species	Sassafras hesperia
Umbellularia dayana	Comb nov		(Knowlton) Berry	Miocene	Mascall Formation	USA; Oregon		An Umbellularia species Moved from Salix dayana (1902); Synonymized into Umbellularia saliciformis (1952)	Umbellularia saliciformis
Umbellularia lanceolata	Sp nov		Berry	Miocene	Latah Formation	USA; Washington		An Umbellularia species later moved to Persea lanceolata (1946)	Persea lanceolata

=== Superasterids - basal ===
Name	Novelty	Status	Authors	Age	Unit	Location	Synonymized taxa	Notes	Images
Arctostaphylos knowltoni	Sp nov	jr synonym	Berry	Miocene	Latah Formation	USA; Washington		First named as a bearberry species Species synonymized into Vaccinium sophoroides (1937)	Vaccinium sophoroides
Arctostaphylos spatulata	Sp nov		Berry	Miocene	Latah Formation	USA; Washington		A bearberry species	Arctostaphylos spatulata
Cornus acuminata	Sp nov	Homonym	Berry	Eocene; Ypresian	Klondike Mountain Formation	USA; Washington		A Schoepfia species jr homonym of ''Cornus acuminata'' (Weber); Renamed Cornus republicensis in 1944; Moved to Schoepfia republicensis in 1987	Schoepfia republicensis
Gordonia pteraformis	Comb nov	jr synonym	Berry	Miocene	Latah Formation	USA; Washington		Suggested as a possible Gordonia species Moved from Carpolithes pteraformis 1929; Moved to Cedrela pteraformis (1935)	Cedrela pteraformis
Nyssa knowltoni	Sp nov	jr synonym	Berry	Miocene	Latah Formation	USA; Washington		A Nyssa species Species synonymized into Ptelea miocenica (1931)	Ptelea miocenica
Nyssa magnifica	Comb nov	valid	(Knowlton) Berry	Miocene	Latah Formation	USA; Washington		A Nyssa species Moved from Carpites magnifica (1926)	Nyssa magnifica
Ternstroemites idahoensis	Comb nov		(Knowlton) Berry	Miocene	Payette Formation	USA; Idaho		A theaceous species Moved from Myrica? idahoensis (1919); Moved to Gordonia idahoensis 1929	
Vaccinium americanum	Comb et Syn nov	valid?	(Lesquereux) Berry	Miocene	Mascall Formation	USA; Oregon	Salix pseudoargentea (1902); Vaccinium salicoides (1926)	A Vaccinium species Moved from Santalum americanum (1883); Two species synonymized Vaccinium salicoides resurrected as incertae sedis (1959)	Vaccinium salicoides
Vaccinium bonseri	Sp et "var" nov	valid	Berry	Miocene	Latah Formation	USA; Washington		A Vaccinium species One variety named V. bonseri serrulatum	Vaccinium bonseri
Vaccinium spokanense	Sp nov		Berry	Miocene	Latah Formation	USA; Washington		A Vaccinium species	Salix spokanensis

=== Superasterids - euasterids ===
Name	Novelty	Status	Authors	Age	Unit	Location	Synonymized taxa	Notes	Images
Apocynophyllum latahense	Sp nov	jr synonym	Berry	Miocene	Latah Formation	USA; Washington		A apocynaceous species Moved to Magnolia latahensis	Magnolia latahensis
Porana microcalyx	Comb nov	jr synonym	Berry	Miocene	Latah Formation	USA; Washington		Redescribed as a Porana species Moved from Diospyros? microcalyx (1926); Moved to Remberella microcalyx (2024)	Remberella microcalyx
Umbelliferospermum	Gen et Sp nov		Berry	Miocene	Latah Formation	USA; Washington		An apiaceous fruit genus The type species is U. latahense	Umbelliferospermum latahense
Viburnum fernquisti	Sp nov	valid	Berry	Miocene	Latah Formation	USA; Washington		A Viburnum seed morphospecies	Viburnum fernquisti
Viburnum lantanafolium	Sp nov	valid	Berry	Miocene	Latah Formation	USA; Washington		A Viburnum leaf morphospecies	Viburnum lantanafolium

=== Superrosids - Basal ===
Name	Novelty	Status	Authors	Age	Unit	Location	Synonymized taxa	Notes	Images
Menziesia knowltoni	Sp nov		Berry	Miocene	Latah Formation	USA; Washington		A Menziesia species	Rhododendron knowltoni
Ribes fernquisti	Sp nov	jr synonym	Berry	Miocene	Latah Formation	USA; Washington		First named as a gooseberry species Renamed and moved to Viburnum ribesiforme (1944)	Viburnum ribesiforme

=== Superrosids - Fabids ===
Name	Novelty	Status	Authors	Age	Unit	Location	Synonymized taxa	Notes	Images
Alnus elliptica	Sp nov	jr synonym	Berry	Eocene; Ypresian	Klondike Mountain Formation	USA; Washington		An alder species Synonymized into Alnus parvifolia (1987)	Alnus parvifolia
Alnus prerhombifolia	Sp nov	jr synonym	Berry	Miocene	Latah Formation	USA; Washington		An alder species Synonymized into Alnus carpinoides (1937); Synonymized into Alnus hollandiana (1959)	Alnus hollandiana
Amygdalus alexanderi	Sp nov	jr synonym	Berry	Miocene	Latah Formation	USA; Washington		First named as an Amygdalus species Synonymized into Fagus washoensis (1937)	
Cassia sophoroides	Comb nov	jr synonym	(Knowlton) Berry	Miocene	Latah Formation	USA; Washington		Recombined as a Cassia species Moved from Phyllites sophoroides (1926); Moved to Vaccinium sophoroides (1937)	Vaccinium sophoroides
Cassia spokanensis	Sp nov	jr synonym	Berry	Miocene	Latah Formation	USA; Washington		First named as a Cassia species Synonymized into Cedrela pteraformis (1935)	Cedrela pteraformis
Celastrus spokanensis	Sp nov	jr synonym	Berry	Miocene	Latah Formation	USA; Washington		First named as a staff vine species Synonymized into Gordonia idahoensis (1959)	Gordonia idahoensis
Cercocarpus praeledifolius	Sp nov		Berry	Miocene	Latah Formation	USA; Washington		A mountain mahogany species	Cercocarpus praeledifolius
Comptonia hesperia	Sp nov		Berry	Miocene	Latah Formation	USA; Washington		A sweet fern species	Comptonia hesperia
Cucurbita glandulosa	Sp nov	jr synonym	Brown	Eocene; Ypresian	Green River Formation	United States (Colorado)		First identified as a gourd seed morphotype Moved to Punctaphyllum glandulosum in 2023	
Euonymus knowltoni	Sp nov		Berry	Miocene	Latah Formation	USA; Washington		A Euonymus species	Hydrangea knowltoni
Hibiscus? occidentalis	Sp nov	jr synonym	Berry	Miocene	Latah Formation	USA; Washington		First named as a possible Hibiscus seed species Moved to Mentzelia occidentalis (1935)	Mentzelia occidentalis
Leguminosites alexanderi	Sp nov		Berry	Miocene	Latah Formation	USA; Washington		A fabaceous fruit species of uncertain affinity	Leguminosites alexanderi
Leguminosites bonseri	Sp nov	jr synonym	Berry	Miocene	Latah Formation	USA; Washington		First named as a fabaceous species of uncertain affinity Synonymized into Umbellularia dayana (1937); Synonymized into Umbellularia saliciformis (1952)	Umbellularia saliciformis
Meibomites knowltoni	Sp nov	jr synonym	Berry	Miocene	Latah Formation	USA; Washington		First named as a fabaceous species Synonymized into Exbucklandia oregonensis (1946)	Exbucklandia oregonensis
Menispermites latahensis	Sp nov	jr synonym	Berry	Miocene	Latah Formation	USA; Washington		First named as a menispermaceous species Synonymized into Vitis washingtonensis (1937)	Vitis washingtonensis
Quercus treleasii	Sp nov	jr synonym	Berry	Miocene	Latah Formation	USA; Washington		First named as an oak species Synonymized into Sophora spokanensis (1937)	Sophora spokanensis
Rhamnus spokanensis	Sp nov	jr synonym	Berry	Miocene	Latah Formation	USA; Washington		First named as a buckthorn species Moved to Salix spokanensis (1937)	Salix spokanensis

=== Superrosids - Malvids ===
Name	Novelty	Status	Authors	Age	Unit	Location	Synonymized taxa	Notes	Images
Aesculus hesperia	Sp nov	jr synonym	Berry	Miocene	Latah Formation	USA; Washington		First named as a horse chestnut species Synonymized into Viburnum lantanafolium (1937)	Viburnum lantanafolium
Sapindus armstrongi	Sp nov	jr synonym	Berry	Miocene	Latah Formation	USA; Washington		First named as a soap berry species Synonymized into Cedrela pteraformis (1937)	Cedrela pteraformis
Sapindus spokanensis	Sp nov	jr synonym	Berry	Miocene	Latah Formation	USA; Washington		First named as a soap berry species Synonymized into Cedrela pteraformis (1935)	
Tilia hesperia	Sp nov	jr synonym	Berry	Miocene	Latah Formation	USA; Washington		A Tilia species Synonymized into Tilia aspera (1935)	Tilia aspera

=== incertae sedis ===
Name	Novelty	Status	Authors	Age	Unit	Location	Synonymized taxa	Notes	Images
Carpolithus pteraformis	Sp nov	jr synonym	Berry	Miocene	Latah Formation	USA; Washington		First named as a seed of uncertain affinity Moved to Gordonia pteraformis later in 1929; Moved to Cedrela pteraformis (1935)	Cedrela pteraformis

== Arthropods ==
=== Crustaceans ===
Name	Novelty	Status	Authors	Age	Unit	Location	Notes	Images
Cycloprosopon			Lorenthey & Beurlen					

=== Insects ===
Name	Novelty	Status	Authors	Age	Unit	Location	Notes	Images
Permotipula		Valid	Tillyard	Permian; Changhsingian - Wuchiapingian	Newcastle Coal Measures	Australia; New South Wales	A protodipteran scorpionfly	

== Dinosaurs ==
- Barosaurus gastroliths documented.

=== New taxa ===
Taxon	Novelty	Status	Author(s)	Age	Unit	Location	Notes	Images
Anodontosaurus inceptus	Gen. et sp. nov.	Valid	Sternberg	Maastrichtian	Horseshoe Canyon Formation	Alberta	An ankylosaurid	
Antarctosaurus wichmannianus	Gen. et sp. nov.	Valid	Huene	Campanian	Anacleto Formation	Argentina	A titanosaur	
Antarctosaurus giganteus	Sp. nov.	Valid	Huene	Campanian	Anacleto Formation	Argentina	A species of Antarctosaurus	
Campylodon ameghinoi	Gen. et sp. nov.	Preoccupied	Huene	Cenomanian	Bajo Barreal Formation	Argentina	A titanosaur preoccupied by Campylodon Dumeril, 1852 and moved to Campylodoniscus in 1961	
Helopus zdanskyi	Gen. et sp. nov.	Preoccupied	Wiman	Barremian-Aptian	Mengyin Formation	China	A sauropod preoccupied by Helopus Wagler and moved to Euhelopus in 1956	
Laplatasaurus araukanicus	Gen. et sp. nov.	Valid	von Huene	Campanian	Allen Formation	Argentina	A titanosaur	
Loricosaurus scutatus	Gen. et sp. nov.	Nomen dubium	von Huene	Campanian	Allen Formation	Argentina	A titanosaur	
Paranthodon owenii	Gen. et sp. nov.	Jr. synonym	Nopcsa	Berriasian	Kirkwood Formation	South Africa	A stegosaur now named Paranthodon africanus	
Rhodanosaurus ludgunensis	Gen et sp nov	Nomen dubium	Nopcsa	Campanian	Gres a Reptiles	France	A nodosaurid.	
Tanius sinensis	Gen. et sp. nov.	Valid	Wiman	Campanian	Jingangkou Formation	China	A hadrosauroid	

== Synapsids ==
=== Non-mammalian ===
Name	Novelty	Status	Authors	Age	Unit	Location	Notes	Images
Eoarctops	Gen et sp nov	jr synonym	Haughton	Permian; Capitanian		South Africa	A gorgonopsid therapsid. The type species is E. vanderbyli A jr synonym of Eriphostoma microdon	Eriphostoma microdon
Hipposaurus	Gen et sp nov	Valid	Haughton	Permian; Capitanian	Beaufort Group; Tapinocephalus Assemblage Zone	South Africa	A biarmosuchian therapsid. The type species is H. boonstrai	Hipposaurus boonstrai
Scullya	Sp nov	nomen dubium	Broom				A titanosuchid dinocephalian	
Styracocephalus	Gen et sp nov	Valid	Haughton	Permian; Capitanian		South Africa	A tapinocephalian therapsid	Styracocephalus

== Other animals ==
Name	Novelty	Status	Authors	Age	Unit	Location	Notes	Images
Rangea	Gen. et sp. nov.	Valid	Gürich	Ediacaran		Namibia	A rangeomorph. The type species is R. schneiderhoehni	
