= 1935 in paleontology =

Paleontology or palaeontology is the study of prehistoric life forms on Earth through the examination of plant and animal fossils. This includes the study of body fossils, tracks (ichnites), burrows, cast-off parts, fossilised feces (coprolites), palynomorphs and chemical residues. Because humans have encountered fossils for millennia, paleontology has a long history both before and after becoming formalized as a science. This article records significant discoveries and events related to paleontology that occurred or were published in the year 1935.

== Plants ==
=== Conifers ===
Name	Novelty	Status	Authors	Age	Unit	Location	Synonymized taxa	Notes	Images
Callitris potlatchensis	Sp nov		Brown	Late Middle Eocene	Salmon Flora	USA; Idaho		A Callitris seed morphospecies	
Keteleeria heterophylloides	Comb nov		(Berry) Brown	Miocene	Latah Formation	USA; Washington		A Keteleeria foliage morphospecies Moved from Potamogeton heterophylloides (1929)	Keteleeria heterophylloides

=== Flowering plants ===
Name	Novelty	Status	Authors	Age	Unit	Location	Synonymized taxa	Notes	Images
Alnus corallina	Syn nov		Lesquereux	Miocene		USA; California	Alnus hollandiana (1920); A. microdontoides (1920)	An alder foliage morphospecies	
Amelanchier dignatus	Comb et syn nov		(Knowlton) Brown	Miocene		USA	Amelanchier grayi (1927); A. peritula (1908); A. scudderi (1883); Phyllites couleeanus (1931)	A Saskatoon berry species Moved from Celastrus dignatus (1902)	
Arctostaphylos cuneata	Sp nov		Brown	Eocene; Bartonian	Salmon Flora	USA; Idaho		An Arctostaphylos foliage morphospecies	
Carpolithus pteraformis	Sp nov		Brown	Miocene	Latah Formation	USA; Idaho		A fruit species of uncertain affinity.	
Ceanothus idahoensis	Sp nov		Brown	Eocene; Bartonian	Salmon Flora	USA; Idaho	Populus zaddachi (1920 pro part)	A Ceanothus species	
Cedrela pteraformis	Comb nov		(Berry) Brown	Miocene	Latah Formation	USA; Washington	Carpolithus pteraformis (1929)	A Cedrela species Moved from Gordonia pteraformis (1929)	Cedrela pteraformis
Cercidiphyllum crenatum	Comb et syn nov		(Unger) Brown				G. obovata (1877); G. obovata (1883)	A katsura species Moved from Grewia crenata (1859)	
Chamaebatia prefoliolosa	Sp nov	jr synonym	Brown	Eocene; Bartonian	Salmon Flora	USA; Idaho		A mountain misery foliage morphospecies moved to Salmonensea prefoliolosa in 1988	Salmonensea prefoliolosa
Dipteronia americana	Sp nov	jr synonym	Brown	Eocene; Ypresian	Eocene Okanagan Highlands; Klondike Mountain Formation	USA; Washington	Comptonia insignis (1929 pro part)	A Dipteronia species Leaves moved to Bohlenia americana (1987); Fruits moved to Dipteronia brownii in 2001	Dipteronia brownii
Fraxinus idahoensis	Sp nov		Brown	Miocene	Latah Formation	USA; Idaho		An ash seed morphospecies	
Malus idahoensis	Sp nov		Brown	Eocene; Bartonian	Salmon Flora	USA; Idaho		An apple foliage morphospecies	
Mentzelia occidentalis	Comb nov		(Berry) Brown	Miocene	Latah Formation	USA; Washington		A Mentzelia species Moved from Hibiscus? occidentalis (1929)	
Potentilla salmonensis	Sp nov		Brown	Eocene; Bartonian	Salmon Flora	USA; Idaho		An cinquefoil foliage morphospecies	
Rhamnus idahoensis	Sp nov		Brown	Eocene; Bartonian	Salmon Flora	USA; Idaho		A buckthorn foliage morphospecies	
Symphoricarpos salmonensis	Sp nov		Brown	Eocene; Bartonian	Salmon Flora	USA; Idaho		A snowberry foliage morphospecies	

== Arthropods ==
=== Insects ===
Name	Novelty	Status	Authors	Age	Unit	Location	Notes	Images
Eulithomyrmex	Gen nov	valid	Carpenter	Late Eocene	Florissant Formation	USA (Colorado)	Agroecomyrmecin ant genus, replacement name for Lithomyrmex Carpenter, 1930	Eulithomyrmex rugosus

== Sauropterygians ==
=== New taxa ===
Name	Novelty	Status	Authors	Age	Type locality	Country	Notes	Images
Peyerus	Gen et comb nov	jr synonym	Stromer	Cretaceous; Valanginian	Sundays River Formation	South Africa	junior synonym of Leptocleidus	Leptocleidus capensis

== Vertebrates ==
=== Dinosaurs ===
Taxon	Novelty	Status	Author(s)	Age	Unit	Location	Notes	Images
Corythosaurus bicristatus	Sp. nov.	Jr. synonym	Parks	Campanian	Dinosaur Park Formation	Alberta	A synonym of Corythosaurus casuarius	
Corythosaurus brevicristatus	Sp. nov.	Jr. synonym	Parks	Campanian	Dinosaur Park Formation	Alberta	A synonym of Corythosaurus casuarius	
Corythosaurus frontalis	Sp. nov.	Jr. synonym	Parks	Campanian	Dinosaur Park Formation	Alberta	A synonym of Lambeosaurus lambei	
Lambeosaurus clavinitialis	Sp. nov.	Valid	Gilmore	Campanian	Dinosaur Park Formation	Alberta	A species of Lambeosaurus	
Lambeosaurus magnicristatum	Sp. nov.	Valid	Gilmore	Campanian	Dinosaur Park Formation	Alberta	A species of Lambeosaurus. Amended to L. magnicristatus in 1938	

=== Synapsids ===
Name	Status	Authors	Age	Unit	Location	Notes	Images
Brachyuraniscus	Junior synonym	Broili & Schroder	Late Permian	Cistecephalus Assemblage Zone	South Africa	A junior synonym of Pristerodon.	
Cteniosaurus	Junior synonym	Broom	Late Permian	Hoedemaker member, Middle Teekloof Formation	South Africa	A junior synonym of Tropidostoma.	
Emydorhinus	Valid	Broom	Late Permian	Dicynodon assemblage zone	South Africa	A dicynodont	
Eumantellia	Junior synonym	Broom	Late Permian	Cistcephalus assemblage zone	South Africa	A junior synonym of Pristerognathus.	
Eurychororhinus	Junior synonym	Broili and Schroeder	Late Permian	Cistecephalus Assemblage Zone	South Africa	A junior synonym of Pristerodon.	
Hofmeyria	Valid	Broom	Late Permian	Cistecephalus Assemblage Zone	South Africa	A theriodont	
Hyenosaurus	Valid						
Stahleckeria	Valid				Brazil		Stahleckeria
Synostocephalus	Valid						
Titanognathus	Valid						
Watsoniella	Valid	Broili and Schroeder	Early to Middle Triassic	Cynognathus zone	South Africa	A theriodont	

== Expeditions, field work, and fossil discoveries ==
- Charles Gilmore returned to prospect for fossils in the Two Medicine Formation.

== Institutions and organizations ==
- The Calgary Public Museum of Alberta, Canada closed due to financial problems triggered by the Great Depression. By this point the museum had accumulated roughly 7500 different items of both natural and man-made origin. The collections were stored in another Calgary building called the Coste House.
