= 1926 in paleontology =

Paleontology or palaeontology is the study of prehistoric life forms on Earth through the examination of plant and animal fossils. This includes the study of body fossils, tracks (ichnites), burrows, cast-off parts, fossilised feces (coprolites), palynomorphs and chemical residues. Because humans have encountered fossils for millennia, paleontology has a long history both before and after becoming formalized as a science. This article records significant discoveries and events related to paleontology that occurred or were published in the year 1926.

== Algae ==
=== Bacillariophyceae ===
| Name | Novelty | Status | Authors | Age | Unit | Location | Notes | Images |
|---|---|---|---|---|---|---|---|---|
| Cymbella partita | sp nov | | Mann | Miocene; Langhian | Latah Formation; Spokane Florule | USA; Washington | A cymbellaceous diatom | Cymbella partita |
| Cymbella sagittarius | sp nov | | Mann | Miocene; Langhian | Latah Formation; Spokane Florule | USA; Washington | A cymbellaceous diatom | Cymbella sagittarius |
| Navicula contendens | sp nov | | Mann | Miocene; Langhian | Latah Formation; Spokane Florule | USA; Washington | A naviculaceous diatom | Navicula contendens |
| Navicula iridescens | sp nov | jr synonym | Mann | Miocene; Langhian | Latah Formation; Spokane Florule | USA; Washington | A naviculaceous diatom Moved to Neidium iridescens (1975) | Neidium iridescens |
| Navicula pauper | sp nov | | Mann | Miocene; Langhian | Latah Formation; Spokane Florule | USA; Washington | A naviculaceous diatom | Navicula pauper |
| Navicula pontifica | sp nov | | Mann | Miocene; Langhian | Latah Formation; Spokane Florule | USA; Washington | A naviculaceous diatom | Navicula pontifica |
| Navicula protrudens | sp nov | | Mann | Miocene; Langhian | Latah Formation; Spokane Florule | USA; Washington | A naviculaceous diatom | Navicula protrudens |
| Navicula pseudoaffinis | sp nov | | Mann | Miocene; Langhian | Latah Formation; Spokane Florule | USA; Washington | A naviculaceous diatom | Navicula pseudoaffinis |
| Navicula reversa | sp nov | | Mann | Miocene; Langhian | Latah Formation; Spokane Florule | USA; Washington | A naviculaceous diatom | Navicula reversa |
| Navicula substauroneis | sp nov | | Mann | Miocene; Langhian | Latah Formation; Spokane Florule | USA; Washington | A naviculaceous diatom | Navicula substauroneis |
| Stauroneis (Navicula) acutissima | sp nov | | Mann | Miocene; Langhian | Latah Formation; Spokane Florule | USA; Washington | A stauroneidaceous diatom | Stauroneis acutissima |

== Plants ==
=== Mosses ===
| Name | Novelty | Status | Authors | Age | Unit | Location | Notes | Images |
|---|---|---|---|---|---|---|---|---|
| Archaeomnium | Gen et sp nov | jr synonym | Britton | Miocene; Langhian | Latah Formation; Spokane Florule | USA; Washington | A moss of uncertain affiliation Synonymized with Hypnites (1980); The type species is A. patens | Hypnites patens |
| Polytrichites | Gen et sp nov | valid? | Britton | Miocene; Langhian | Latah Formation; Spokane Florule | USA; Washington | A possible polytrichaceous moss The type species is P. spokanensis | Polytrichites spokanensis |

=== Lycopods ===
| Name | Novelty | Status | Authors | Age | Unit | Location | Notes | Images |
|---|---|---|---|---|---|---|---|---|
| Lycopodium hesperium | Sp nov | Nomen dubium? | Knowlton | Miocene; Langhian | Latah Formation; Coeur d'Alene Florule | USA; Idaho | A possible lycopod clubmoss Treated as a plant of uncertain affinity by Chaney & Axelrod 1959 | Lycopodium hesperium |

=== Conifers ===
| Name | Novelty | Status | Authors | Age | Unit | Location | Notes | Images |
|---|---|---|---|---|---|---|---|---|
| Libocedrus praedecurrens | Sp nov | jr synonym | Knowlton | Miocene; Langhian | Latah Formation; Potlatch Florule | USA; Idaho | A sandarac species Moved to Fokienia praedecurrens (1959); Moved to Fokieniopsis praedecurrens (1997). Moved to Tetraclinis salicornioides var. praedecurrens (2000) | Tetraclinis salicornioides var. praedecurrens |
| Tumion bonseri | Sp nov | jr synonym | Knowlton | Miocene; Langhian | Latah Formation; Spokane Florule | USA; Washington | A plum-yew species Moved to Torreya bonseri (1952); Moved to Cephalotaxus bonseri (1959) | Cephalotaxus bonseri |

=== Angiosperms ===
==== Monocots ====
| Name | Novelty | Status | Authors | Age | Unit | Location | Notes | Images |
|---|---|---|---|---|---|---|---|---|
| Arisaema hesperia | Sp nov | valid? | Knowlton | Miocene; Langhian | Latah Formation; Coeur d'Alene Florule | USA; Idaho | A possible araceous monocot Sometimes had been treated as a jr synonym of Liquidambar pachyphyllum | Arisaema hesperia |
| Canna? dawsoni | Sp nov | jr synonym | Berry | Eocene | Burrard Formation | Canada; British Columbia | A possible cannaceous leaf species synonymized with Cannophyllites magnifolia in 1949 | |

==== Basal eudicots ====
| Name | Novelty | Status | Authors | Age | Unit | Location | Notes | Images |
|---|---|---|---|---|---|---|---|---|
| Trochodendroides | Gen et comb nov | | Berry | | | Greenland | A Trochodenraceous leaf morphogenus. The type species is Populus arctica (1868) | |

==== Superasterids - basal ====
| Name | Novelty | Status | Authors | Age | Unit | Location | Notes | Images |
|---|---|---|---|---|---|---|---|---|
| Diospyros andersonae | Sp nov | Jr synonym | Knowlton | Miocene; Langhian | Latah Formation; Spokane Florule | USA; Washington | A persimmon leaf species Synonymized into Diospyros oregoniana (1959) | Diospyros oregoniana |
| Diospyros dawsoni | Sp nov | | Berry | Eocene; Ypresian | Okanagan Highlands; Chu Chua Formation | Canada; British Columbia | A persimmon leaf species | |
| Diospyros? microcalyx | Sp nov | Jr synonym | Knowlton | Miocene; Langhian | Latah Formation; Spokane Florule | USA; Washington | First named as a persimmon calyx species. Moved to Porana microcalyx (1929); Moved to Remberella microcalyx (2024) | Remberella microcalyx |
| Vaccinium salicoides | Sp nov | valid? | Knowlton | Miocene; Langhian | Latah Formation; Coeur d'Alene Florule | USA; Idaho | First named as a huckleberry leaf species Synonymized into Vaccinium americanum (1929); Resurrected as a species of uncertain affinity (1959) | Vaccinium salicoides |

==== Superrosids - Fabids ====
| Name | Novelty | Status | Authors | Age | Unit | Location | Notes | Images |
|---|---|---|---|---|---|---|---|---|
| Alnus cremastogynoides | Sp nov | | Berry | Eocene; Ypresian | Chu Chua Formation | Canada; British Columbia | An alder leaf species | |
| Alnus crispoides | Sp nov | | Berry | Eocene; Ypresian | Chu Chua Formation | Canada; British Columbia | An alder leaf species | |
| Betula bryani | Sp nov | jr synonym | Knowlton | Miocene; Langhian | Latah Formation; Spokane Florule | USA; Washington | First named as a birch leaf species Synonymized into Alnus fairi (1937) | Alnus fairi |
| Betula fairii | Sp nov | jr synonym | Knowlton | Miocene; Langhian | Latah Formation; Spokane Florule | USA; Washington | First named as a birch leaf species Moved to Alnus fairi (1966) | Alnus fairi |
| Betula? largei | Sp nov | jr synonym | Knowlton | Miocene; Langhian | Latah Formation; Spokane Florule | USA; Washington | First named as a birch leaf species Synonymized into Alnus fairi (1937); Resurrected and moved to Alnus largei (1966) | Alnus largei |
| Betula nanoides | Sp nov | jr synonym | Knowlton | Miocene; Langhian | Latah Formation; Coeur d'Alene Florule | USA; Idaho | First named as a birch leaf species Synonymized into Alnus fairi (1934) | Alnus fairi |
| Betula parvifolia | Sp nov | jr synonym | Berry | Eocene; Ypresian | Chu Chua Formation | Canada; British Columbia | First named as a birch leaf species Moved to Alnus parvifolia (1987) | Alnus parvifolia |
| Betula thor | Sp nov | valid | Knowlton | Miocene; Langhian | Latah Formation; Spokane Florule | USA; Washington | First named as a birch leaf species Synonymized into Betula heteromorpha (1937); Resurrected as Betula thor (1959) | Betula thor |
| Celastrophyllum pugetensis | Sp nov | | Berry | Eocene | Burrard Formation | Canada; British Columbia | A possible celastraceous leaf species | |
| Celastrus fernquisti | Sp nov | jr synonym | Knowlton | Miocene; Langhian | Latah Formation; Coeur d'Alene Florule | USA; Idaho | First named as a Celastrus leaf species Synonymized into Alnus fairi (1937) | Alnus fairi |
| Cercis? spokanensis | Sp nov | jr synonym | Knowlton | Miocene; Langhian | Latah Formation; Spokane Florule | USA; Washington | First named as a redbud fruit species Moved to Caesalpinia spokanensis (1991) | Caesalpinia spokanensis |
| Comptonia predryandroides | Sp nov | | Berry | Eocene; Ypresian | Chu Chua Formation | Canada; British Columbia | A myricaceous leaf species | |
| Ficus? johnstoni | Sp nov | | Berry | Eocene | Burrard Formation | Canada; British Columbia | A possible moraceous leaf species | |
| Ficus? washingtonensis | Sp nov | jr synonym | Knowlton | Miocene; Langhian | Latah Formation; Coeur d'Alene Florule | USA; Idaho | First named as a fig leaf species Synonymized into Cercis spokanensis (1937); Synonymized into Exbucklandia oregonesis (1946) | Exbucklandia oregonensis |
| Hicoria dawsoni | Sp nov | jr synonym | Berry | Eocene; Ypresian | Chu Chua Formation | Canada; British Columbia | A punitive hickory leaf species Moved to Carya dawsoni in 1952 | |
| Hicoria stanleyanum | comb nov | jr synonym | (Dawson) Berry | Eocene | Burrard Formation | Canada; British Columbia | A punitive hickory leaf species Moved from Dryophyllum stanleyanum (1895); Moved to Carya stanleyanum in 1952 | |
| Juglans nigelloides | Sp nov | | Berry | Eocene | Burrard Formation | Canada; British Columbia | A juglandaceous leaf species | |
| Leguminosites johnstoni | Sp nov | | Berry | Eocene; Ypresian | Burrard Formation | Canada; British Columbia | A legume leaf morphospecies. | |
| Meibomites lucens | Sp nov | jr synonym | Knowlton | Miocene; Langhian | Latah Formation; Coeur d'Alene Florule | USA; Idaho | First named as a Meibomites leaf species Synonymized into Cercis spokanensis (1937); Synonymized into Exbucklandia oregonesis (1946) | |
| Myrica uglowi | Sp nov | Jr synonym | Berry | Eocene; Ypresian | Chu Chua Formation | Canada; British Columbia | A myricaceous leaf species synonymized with Bohlenia insignis in 1987. | |
| Populus acuminatafolia | Sp nov | | Berry | Eocene; Ypresian | Chu Chua Formation | Canada; British Columbia | A cottonwood leaf species | |
| Populus fairii | Sp nov | jr synonym | Knowlton | Miocene; Langhian | Latah Formation; Spokane Florule | USA; Washington | First named as a cottonwood leaf species Synonymized with Zizyphoides auriculata (1991) | Zizyphoides auriculata |
| Populus heteromorpha | Sp nov | jr synonym | Knowlton | Miocene; Langhian | Latah Formation; Spokane Florule | USA; Washington | First named as a cottonwood leaf species Synonymized with Zizyphoides auriculata (1991) | Zizyphoides auriculata |
| Populus washingtonensis | Sp nov | jr synonym | Knowlton | Miocene; Langhian | Latah Formation; Coeur d'Alene Florule | USA; Idaho | First named as a cottonwood leaf species Moved to Vitus washingtonensis (1937) | Vitis washingtonensis |
| Prunus rustii | Sp nov | jr synonym | Knowlton | Miocene; Langhian | Latah Formation; Coeur d'Alene Florule | USA; Idaho | First named as a cherry leaf species Synonymized into Alnus corallina (1937) Synonymized into Alnus hollandiana (1959) | Alnus hollandiana |
| Quercus chaneyi | Sp nov | jr synonym | Knowlton | Miocene; Langhian | Latah Formation; Spokane Florule | USA; Washington | An oak leaf species Synonymized with Quercus simulata (1929) | Quercus simulata |
| Quercus cognatus | Sp nov | jr synonym | Knowlton | Miocene; Langhian | Latah Formation; Coeur d'Alene Florule | USA; Idaho | An oak leaf species Synonymized with Quercus payettensis (1937) | Quercus payettensis |
| Quercus obtusa | Sp nov | jr synonym | Knowlton | Miocene; Langhian | Latah Formation; Spokane Florule | USA; Washington | An oak leaf species Synonymized with Quercus payettensis (1937) | Quercus payettensis |
| Quercus praenigra | Sp nov | jr synonym | Knowlton | Miocene; Langhian | Latah Formation; Coeur d'Alene Florule | USA; Idaho | An oak leaf species Synonymized with Quercus payettensis (1937) | Quercus payettensis |
| Quercus rustii | Sp nov | jr synonym | Knowlton | Miocene; Langhian | Latah Formation; Coeur d'Alene Florule | USA; Idaho | An oak leaf species Synonymized with Quercus payettensis (1937) | Quercus payettensis |
| Quercus spokanensis | Sp nov | jr synonym | Knowlton | Miocene; Langhian | Latah Formation; Coeur d'Alene Florule | USA; Idaho | First named as an oak leaf species Synonymized with Castanea orientalis (1929); Resurrected as Castanea spokanensis (1959) | Castanea spokanensis |
| Quercus uglowi | Sp nov | | Berry | Eocene; Ypresian | Chu Chua Formation | Canada; British Columbia | A oak leaf species | |
| Rhamnus kitsilaniana | Sp nov | | Berry | Eocene | Burrard Formation | Canada; British Columbia | A buckthorn leaf morphospecies. | |
| Salix bryani | Sp nov | jr synonym | Knowlton | Miocene; Langhian | Latah Formation; Spokane Florule | USA; Washington | A willow leaf species Synonymized into Salix florissanti (1934); Synonymized into Salix hesperia (1959) | Salix hesperia |
| Salix inquirenda | Sp nov | jr synonym | Knowlton | Miocene; Langhian | Latah Formation; Spokane Florule | USA; Washington | A willow leaf species Synonymized into Salix hesperia (1944) | Salix hesperia |
| Salix remotidens | Sp nov | jr synonym | Knowlton | Miocene; Langhian | Latah Formation; Spokane Florule | USA; Washington | A willow leaf species Synonymized into Salix hesperia (1944) | Salix hesperia |
| Sophora alexanderi | Sp nov | jr synonym | Knowlton | Miocene; Langhian | Latah Formation; Coeur d'Alene Florule | USA; Idaho | A Sophora leaf species Synonymized into Sophora spokanensis (1937) | Sophora spokanensis |
| Sophora spokanensis | Sp nov | | Knowlton | Miocene; Langhian | Latah Formation; Spokane Florule | USA; Washington | A Sophora leaf species | Sophora spokanensis |
| Sorbus decorifolia | Sp nov | | Berry | Eocene; Ypresian | Chu Chua Formation | Canada; British Columbia | A punitive mountain ash leaf species | |
| Ulmus columbianus | sp nov | jr homonym | Berry | Eocene; Ypresian | Chu Chua Formation | Canada; British Columbia | An elm leaf species Name preoccupied by Ulmus columbianus Penhallow (1907); Moved to Ulmus chuchuanus in 1952. | Ulmus chuchuanus |
| Ulmus fernquisti | Sp nov | jr synonym | Knowlton | Miocene; Langhian | Latah Formation; Spokane Florule | USA; Washington | First named as an elm leaf species Synonymized into Zelkova oregoniana (1937); Moved to Zelkova browni (1977) | Zelkova browni |

==== Superrosids - Malvids ====
| Name | Novelty | Status | Authors | Age | Unit | Location | Notes | Images |
|---|---|---|---|---|---|---|---|---|
| Acer chaneyi | Sp nov | Valid | Knowlton | Miocene; Langhian | Latah Formation; Spokane Florule | USA; Washington | A maple species | Acer chaneyi |
| Malva? hesperia | Sp nov | jr synonym | Knowlton | Miocene; Langhian | Latah Formation; Spokane Florule | USA; Washington | First named as a possible mallow fruit species Synonymized with Nordenskioldia interglacialis (1991) | Nordenskioldia interglacialis |

==== Angiosperms - other ====
| Name | Novelty | Status | Authors | Age | Unit | Location | Notes | Images |
|---|---|---|---|---|---|---|---|---|
| Carpites boraginoides | Sp nov | valid? | Knowlton | Miocene; Langhian | Latah Formation; Coeur d'Alene Florule | USA; Idaho | A fruit or seed of uncertain affinity Suggested to possibly be boraginaceous or malvaceous | Carpites boraginoides |
| Carpites ginkgoides | Sp nov | valid? | Knowlton | Miocene; Langhian | Latah Formation; Coeur d'Alene Florule | USA; Idaho | A fruit or seed of uncertain affinity Strongly similar to modern Ginkgo biloba fruits. | Carpites ginkgoides |
| Carpites magnifica | Sp nov | valid? | Knowlton | Miocene; Langhian | Latah Formation; Coeur d'Alene Florule | USA; Idaho | A fruit or seed of uncertain affinity Moved to Nyssa magnifica (1929) | Nyssa magnifica |
| Carpites menthoides | Sp nov | jr synonym | Knowlton | Miocene; Langhian | Latah Formation; Spokane Florule | USA; Washington | First named as a fruit of uncertain affinity Synonymized into Nordenskioldia interglacialis (1991) | Nordenskioldia interglacialis |
| Carpites paulownia | Sp nov | jr synonym | Knowlton | Miocene; Langhian | Latah Formation; Coeur d'Alene Florule | USA; Idaho | A fruit or seed of uncertain affinity Synonymized into Gordonia hesperia (1937); Synonymized into Gordonia idahoensis (1959) | Gordonia idahoensis |
| Carpites polygonoides | Sp nov | valid? | Knowlton | Miocene; Langhian | Latah Formation; Spokane Florule | USA; Washington | A fruit or seed of uncertain affinity Reminiscent of Rumex fruits | Carpites polygonoides |
| Carpites spokanensis | Sp nov | valid? | Knowlton | Miocene; Langhian | Latah Formation; Spokane Florule | USA; Washington | Seed or other reproductive organs of uncertain affinity Brown (1937) suggested as bud scales | Carpites spokanensis |
| Phyllites amplexicaulis | Sp nov | jr synonym | Knowlton | Miocene; Langhian | Latah Formation; Spokane Florule | USA; Washington | First named as a fruit of uncertain affinity Synonymized with Nordenskioldia interglacialis (1991) | Nordenskioldia interglacialis |
| Phyllites crustacea | Sp nov | jr synonym | Knowlton | Miocene; Langhian | Latah Formation; Spokane Florule | USA; Washington | First named as a leaf of uncertain affinity Synonymized into Zelkova oregoniana (1937); Synonymized into Quercus simulata (1959) | Quercus simulata |
| Phyllites pardeei | Sp nov | jr synonym | Knowlton | Miocene; Langhian | Latah Formation; Spokane Florule | USA; Washington | First named as a leaf of uncertain affinity Moved to Philadelphus pardeei (1937) | Philadelphus pardeei |
| Phyllites peculiaris | Sp nov | jr synonym | Knowlton | Miocene; Langhian | Latah Formation; Spokane Florule | USA; Washington | First named as a leaf of uncertain affinity Synonymized into Philadelphus pardeei (1937) | Philadelphus pardeei |
| Phyllites relatus | Sp nov | jr synonym | Knowlton | Miocene; Langhian | Latah Formation; Spokane Florule | USA; Washington | First named as a leaf of uncertain affinity Moved to Alnus relatus (1937) | Alnus relatus |
| Phyllites sophoroides | Sp nov | jr synonym | Knowlton | Miocene; Langhian | Latah Formation; Spokane Florule | USA; Washington | First named as a leaf of uncertain affinity Moved to Vaccinium sophoroides (1937) | Vaccinium sophoroides |

== Conodonts ==
| Name | Novelty | Status | Authors | Age | Unit | Location | Notes | Images |
|---|---|---|---|---|---|---|---|---|
| Ancyrodella | | Valid | Ulrich & Bassler | | | | | |

== Amphibians ==
| Name | Novelty | Status | Authors | Age | Unit | Location | Notes | Images |
|---|---|---|---|---|---|---|---|---|
| Crassigyrinus | Gen et comb nov | jr synonym | Watson | | | | A new genus for Macromerium scoticum | Crassigyrinus |

== Newly named basal diapsids ==
| Name | Novelty | Status | Authors | Age | Unit | Location | Notes | Images |
|---|---|---|---|---|---|---|---|---|
| Coelurosauravus | | Valid | Piveteau | | | Madagascar | A weigeltisaurid gliding Reptile | Coelurosauravus |

== Dinosaurs ==
| Taxon | Novelty | Status | Author(s) | Age | Unit | Location | Notes | Images |
|---|---|---|---|---|---|---|---|---|
| Proceratosaurus | Gen. nov. | Valid | von Huene | Bathonian | Forest Marble Formation | England | A new genus name for Megalosaurus bradleyi | |
| Rhoetosaurus brownei | Gen. et sp. nov. | Valid | Longman | Oxfordian | Walloon Coal Measures | Queensland | An early sauropod | |
| Thespesius saskatchewanensis | Sp. nov. | Jr. synonym | Sternberg | Maastrichtian | Frenchman Formation | Saskatchewan | A species of Thespesius now a synonym of Edmontosaurus annectens | |

== Synapsids ==
=== Non-mammalian ===
| Name | Novelty | Status | Authors | Age | Unit | Location | Notes | Images |
|---|---|---|---|---|---|---|---|---|
| Chiwetasaurus | | Junior synonym | Haughton | Late Permian; Lopingian | Beaufort Group; Cistecephalus Assemblage Zone | South Africa | A junior synonym of Gorgonops. | |
| Dixeya | | Junior synonym | Haughton | Late Permian | Teekloof Formation; Tropidostoma Assemblage Zone | South Africa | A junior synonym of Aelurognathus. | |
