= 1931 in paleontology =

List of years in paleontology	(table)
- … 1921; 1922; 1923; 1924; 1925; 1926; 1927; 1928; 1929; 1930; 1931; 1932; 1933; 1934; 1935; 1936; 1937; 1938; 1939; 1940; 1941 …
- In science 1928 1929 1930 1931 1932 1933 1934
- Art; Archaeology; Architecture; Literature; Music; Philosophy; Science; +...

Paleontology or palaeontology is the study of prehistoric life forms on Earth through the examination of plant and animal fossils. This includes the study of body fossils, tracks (ichnites), burrows, cast-off parts, fossilised feces (coprolites), palynomorphs and chemical residues. Because humans have encountered fossils for millennia, paleontology has a long history both before and after becoming formalized as a science. This article records significant discoveries and events related to paleontology that occurred or were published in the year 1931.

== Vertebrates ==
=== Conodonts ===
Name	Novelty	Status	Authors	Age	Unit	Location	Synonymized taxa	Notes	Images
Idiognathodus	Gen et sp nov	valid	Gunnell	Gzhelian	Fort Scott Limestone	USA; Missouri		The type species is I. simulator	

=== Jawless fish ===
Name	Novelty	Status	Authors	Age	Unit	Location	Synonymized taxa	Notes	Images
Cardipeltis	Gen est sp nov	Valid	Branson & Mehl	Devonian	Jefferson Formation	USA; Utah		A heterostracan agnathan The type species is C. wallacii.	Cardipeltis wallacii

=== Crocodylomorphs ===
Taxon	Novelty	Status	Author(s)	Age	Unit	Location	Notes	Images
Brasileosaurus	Gen. et sp. nov.	Valid	Huene	Turonian	Adamantina Formation	Brazil		Named as a coelurosaurbut reclassified as a notosuchid

=== Dinosaurs ===
Taxon	Novelty	Status	Author(s)	Age	Unit	Location	Notes	Images
Carcharodontosaurus	Gen. et comb. nov.	Valid	Stromer	Cenomanian	Bahariya Formation	Egypt	A new genus for Megalosaurus saharicus	
Cionodon kysylkumense	Sp. nov.	Nomen dubium	Riabinin	Cenomanian	Dzharakuduk Formation	Uzbekistan	A species of Cionodon	
Embasaurus minax	Gen. et sp. nov.	Nomen dubium	Riabinin	Berriasian	Neocomian sands	Kazakhstan	A theropod of uncertain placement	
Orthogoniosaurus matleyi	Gen. et sp. nov.	Nomen dubium	Das-Gupta	Maastrichtian	Lameta Formation	India	An indeterminate theropod tooth-taxon	
Parasaurolophus tubicen	Sp. nov.	Valid	Wiman	Campanian	Kirtland Formation	USA	A species of Parasaurolophus	
Tetragonosaurus praeceps	Gen. et sp. nov.	Jr. synonym	Parks	Campanian	Dinosaur Park Formation	Canada	A juvenile of Lambeosaurus	
Tetragonosaurus erectofrons	Sp. nov.	Jr. synonym	Parks	Campanian	Dinosaur Park Formation	Canada	A juvenile of Corythosaurus	

=== Synapsids ===
==== New taxa ====
Name	Status	Authors	Age	Location	Notes	Images
Cerataelurus	Junior synonym of Pristerodon.					
Ericiolacerta	Valid	Watson	250 Millions of years ago.	Antarctica; South Africa	Despite the meaning of his name, it was not related to lizards.	Ericiolacerta
Euchambersia	Valid	Broom				
Ictidostoma	Valid	Broom	261 Millions of years ago.	South Africa		
Ictidosuchoides	Valid	Broom	257 Millions of years ago.	South Africa		Ictidosuchoides
Keratocephalus	Valid	Huene	261 Millions of years ago.	South Africa	A protomammal with strange bumps on its head.	Keratocephalus
Lycideops	Valid	Broom	257 Millions of years ago.	South Africa		
Megacyclops	Junior synonym of Neomegacyclops.					
Neomegacyclops	Valid	Boonstra				

== Arthropods ==
=== Insects ===
==== Blattoidea ====
Name	Novelty	Status	Authors	Age	Unit	Location	Notes	Images
Stylotermes washingtonensis	sp. nov	Jr synonym	Snyder	Miocene; Langhian	Latah Formation; Spokane Florule	USA; Washington	A Stylotermitid termite. Moved to Parastylotermes washingtonensis (1949)	

==== Coleoptera ====
Name	Novelty	Status	Authors	Age	Unit	Location	Notes	Images
Pterostichus fernquisti	sp. nov		Wickham	Miocene; Langhian	Latah Formation; Spokane Florule	USA; Washington	A carabid ground beetle	
Dytiscus latahensis	sp. nov		Wickham	Miocene; Langhian	Latah Formation; Spokane Florule	USA; Washington	A predaceous diving beetle	

==== Diptera ====
Name	Novelty	Status	Authors	Age	Unit	Location	Notes	Images
Elephantomyia baltica	Sp. nov	valid	Alexander	Middle Eocene	Baltic amber	Russia	A Limoniid cranefly	

==== Hymenoptera ====
Name	Novelty	Status	Authors	Age	Unit	Location	Notes	Images
Bombus proavus	Sp. nov		Cockerell	Miocene; Langhian	Latah Formation; Spokane Florule	USA; Washington	A bumble bee	

==== Hemiptera ====
Name	Novelty	Status	Authors	Age	Unit	Location	Notes	Images
Latahcoris	Gen et sp. nov		Cockerell	Miocene; Langhian	Latah Formation; Spokane Florule	USA; Washington	A tessaratomid giant stink bug The type species is L. spectatus	
Miocordulia	Gen et sp. nov		Kennedy	Miocene; Langhian	Latah Formation; Spokane Florule	USA; Washington	A corduliid dragonfly The type species is M. latipennis	
Miopsyche	Gen et 2 sp. nov		Carpenter	Miocene; Langhian	Latah Formation; Spokane Florule	USA; Washington	A northern caddisfly genus The type species is M. alexanderi Also includes M. martynovi	
Phryganea spokanensis	Sp. nov		Carpenter	Miocene; Langhian	Latah Formation; Spokane Florule	USA; Washington	A giant caddisfly species	

== Plants ==
=== Angiosperms ===
==== Monocots ====
Name	Novelty	Status	Authors	Age	Unit	Location	Synonymized taxa	Notes	Images
Lysichiton washingtonense	Sp nov	Valid?	Berry	Miocene; Langhian	Latah Formation; Grand Coulee Florule	USA; Washington		First described as a skunk cabbage fruit species Treated as placement incertae sedis by Chaney & Axelrod (1959)	Lysichiton washingtonense

==== Superasterids ====
Name	Novelty	Status	Authors	Age	Unit	Location	Synonymized taxa	Notes	Images
Nyssa hesperia	Sp nov	valid	Berry	Miocene; Langhian	Latah Formation; Grand Coulee Florule	USA; Washington		A tuplo seed species.	

==== Superrosids ====
Name	Novelty	Status	Authors	Age	Unit	Location	Synonymized taxa	Notes	Images
Vitis bonseri	Sp nov	valid	Berry	Miocene; Langhian	Latah Formation; Grand Coulee Florule	USA; Washington		A grape seed species.	
Hicoria washingtoniana	Sp nov	jr synonym	Berry	Miocene; Langhian	Latah Formation; Grand Coulee Florule	USA; Washington		First described as a hickory species. Synonymized into Magnolia dayana	Magnolia dayana
Quercus mccanni	Sp nov	valid	Berry	Miocene; Langhian	Latah Formation; Grand Coulee Florule	USA; Washington		An oak species.	Quercus mccanni
Ptelea miocenica	Sp nov	valid	Berry	Miocene; Langhian	Latah Formation; Grand Coulee Florule	USA; Washington		An hoptree species.	Ptelea miocenica

==== Incertae sedis ====
Name	Novelty	Status	Authors	Age	Unit	Location	Synonymized taxa	Notes	Images
Phyllites couleeannus	Sp nov	jr synonym	Berry	Miocene; Langhian	Latah Formation; Grand Coulee Florule	USA; Washington		First described as a leaf morphospecies of uncertain affinity. Moved to Amelanchier couleeana (1946)	Amelanchier couleeana
