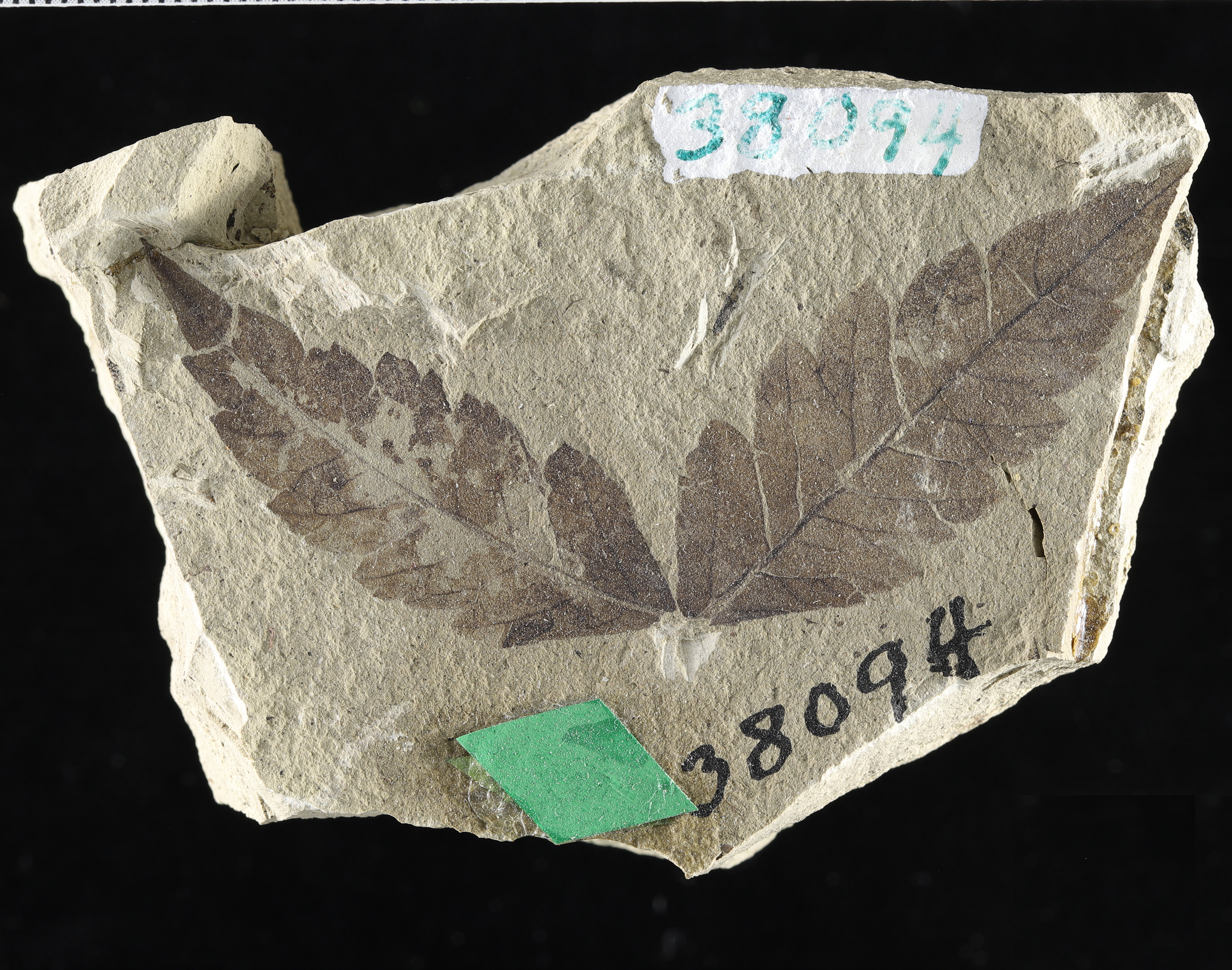
- Bohlenia americana lectotypes

Scientific classification
- Kingdom: Plantae
- Clade: Tracheophytes
- Clade: Angiosperms
- Clade: Eudicots
- Clade: Rosids
- Order: Sapindales
- Family: Sapindaceae
- Subfamily: incertae sedis
- Genus: †Bohlenia; Wolfe & Wehr

Species
- Bohlenia americana; Bohlenia insignis

Synonyms
- B. americana synonymy: Comptonia insignis auct. non (Lesquereux) Cockerell of Berry, 1929; Dipteronia americana Brown, 1935 (part); B. insignis synonymy: Myrica insignis Lesquereux, 1878; Myrica latiloba var. aculiloba Lesquereux, 1878; Rhus subrhomboidalis Lesquereux, 1883; Comptonia acutiloba (Lesquereux) Cockerell, 1906; Comptonia insignis (Lesquereux) Cockerell, 1906; Myrica uglowi Berry, 1926

= Bohlenia =

Bohlenia Temporal range: 51–49 Ma Early Eocene (Ypresian)

Extinct species of flowering plant

Bohlenia is an extinct flowering plant genus in the soapberry family Sapindaceae which is solely known from Eocene sediments exposed in western North America. The genus contains two described species, the type species Bohlenia americana along with Bohlenia insignis. Early description of the genus included both leaves and fruits, however the fruits were removed and named Dipteronia brownii 15 years later. The genus had been considered a part of the tribe Paullinieae, but is currently placed incertae sedis within Sapindaceae.

== Distribution ==
Bohlenia has been recovered from a series of four geologic formations in the Eocene Okanagan Highlands, with two occurrences of B. americana, one of cf. B. insignis, and one only reported as Bohlenia. Leaves of B. americana are known from the Klondike Mountain Formation sites around Ferry County, Washington, and the Tranquille Formations Falkland site near Cache Creek, British Columbia. The Quilchena site of the Coldwater Beds has undescribed leaves which are only attributed to Bohlenia and not identified to a species.

Bohlenia insignis is primarily known from the younger Florissant Formation in Colorado, where it is a notable component of the flora. In contrast, the Chu Chua Formations Joseph Creek site has leaves which were initially synonymized into B. insignis, but have more recently been considered as similar to that species but not part.

Early estimates of the highlands sites ranged from Miocene to Eocene in age. The age of the Klondike Mountain Formation was debated for many years, with plant fossils suggesting a Late Oligocene or Early Miocene age, and the first descriptions of species from the area included them in the Middle Miocene Latah Formation. By the early 1960's the Klondike Mountain formation was thought to be late Oligocene in age. Potassium-argon radiometric dating of samples taken near the Tom Thumb mine in 1966 resulted in a tentative 55 million years old age. Further refinement of sample dating has yielded an approximately Early Eocene, Ypresian age, being radiometrically dated as 49.4 million years old. A 2003 report using dating of detrital zircon crystals with the tuffs of the Klondike Mountain Formation had been dated to 49.42 ± 0.54 million years ago, the youngest of the Okanagan Highlands sites, A 2021 report revised the possible oldest age to around 51.2 ± 0.1 million years ago based on isotopic data from zircon crystals.

The Florissant Formation is composed of successive lake deposits resulting from a volcanic debris flow damming a valley. When Bohlenia insignis was described, the Florissant Formation was considered to be Miocene in age, based on the flora and fauna preserved. Successive research and fossil descriptions moved the age older and by 1985 the formation had been reassigned to an Oligocene age. Further refinement of the formation's age using radiometric dating of sanidine crystals has resulted in an age of 34.07 million years ago placing the formation in the Priabonian stage of the Late Eocene.

The Florissant paleoforest surrounding the lake has been described as similar to modern southeastern North America, with a number of taxa represented that are now found in the subtropics to tropics and confined to the old world. Harry MacGinitie (1953) suggested a warm temperate climate based on the modern biogeographic relatives of the biota found in the formation. Modern estimates of the paleoelevation range between 1,900–4,133 m (6,234–13,560 ft), notably higher than the original estimates by MacGinitie of 300–900 m (980–2,950 ft). Estimates of the mean annual temperature for the Florissant Formation have been derived from climate leaf analysis multivariate program (CLAMP) analysis and modern forest equivalencies of the paleoflora. The results of the various methods have gaven a mean annual temperature range between approximately 10.8–17.5 °C (51.4–63.5 °F), while the bioclimactic analysis for suggests mean annual precipitation amounts of 50 cm (20 in).

== History and classification ==
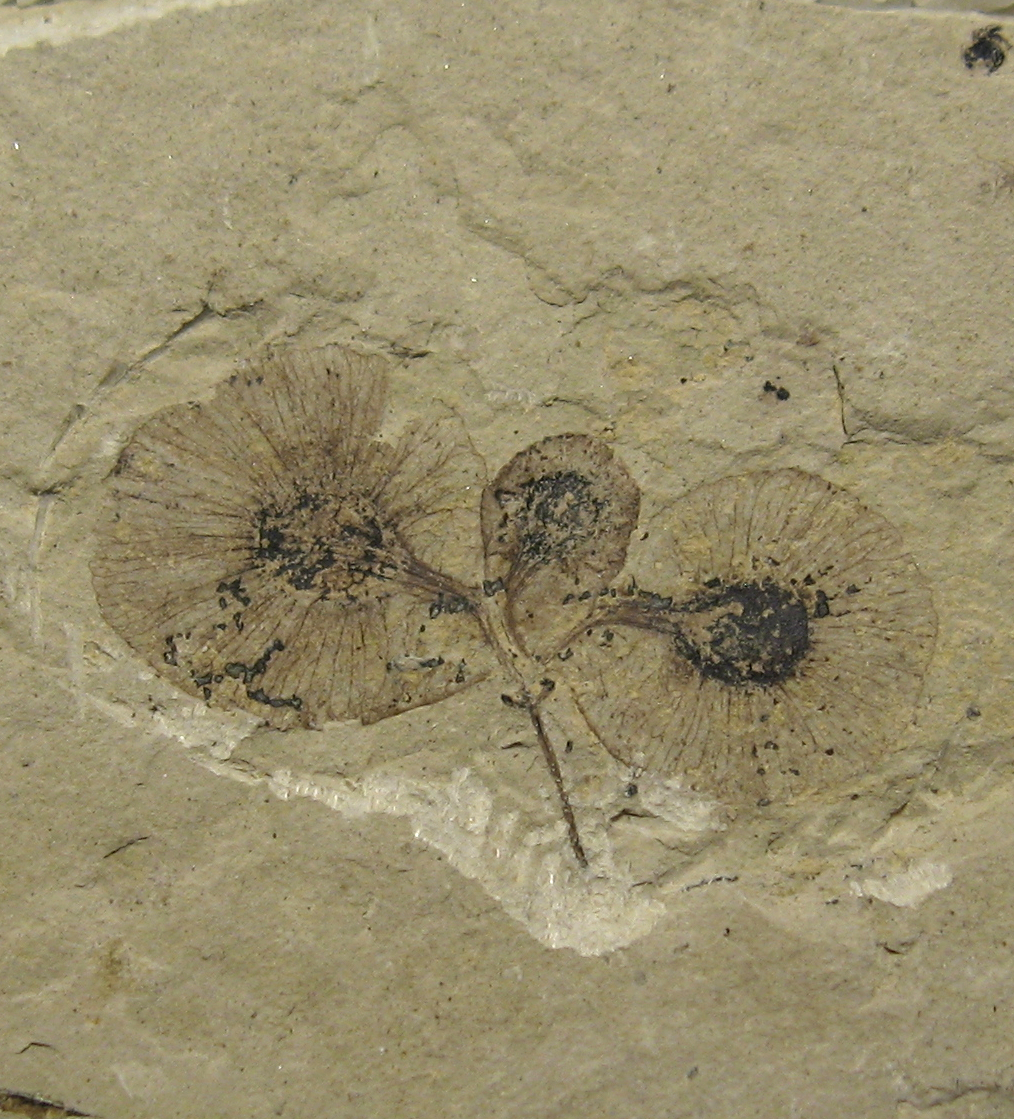
A 3-fruit Dipteronia brownii schizocarp Republic, Washington

The first fossils of Bohlenia were described by Leo Lesquereux (1873) and named Myrica latiloba acutiloba. Two years later (1875) he named Myrica insignis and Myrica saportana, with Rhus subrhomboidalis being named in 1883. While documenting the described Florissant Formation biota as of 1906, Theodore Cockerell transferred both Myrica insignis and M. latiloba acutiloba to Comptonia, but no commentary was made regarding the other two taxa, similarly Frank Knowlton in 1917 reviewed the Florissant specimens and agreed with the placement of the leaf species in Comptonia. Presented with a collection of material from British Columbia, Berry published a 1926 monograph which included a number of new species from the Chu Chua area in Central British Columbia. One of the new species, based on several isolated leaflets he named as Myrica uglowi collected from the Joseph Creek outcrops. In 1929 a pair of fossil leaves was described from the Republic Flora in Republic, Washington, which Edward W. Berry then assumed belonged to the Miocene Latah Formation. Berry placed the leaves as Comptonia insignis members and they were retained there until 1935. By then the Republic Flora was recognized to be older than the Latah Formation, though the host Klondike Mountain Formation wouldn't officially be described and named until 1962. Working with new collections from Republic and other sites, Roland Wilbur Brown moved the Republic leaves out of Comptonia insignis to a new Dipteronia species Dipteronia americana. He based his expanded description and new species on newly identified fruits from the same location, and which he placed as fruits belonging to the leaf fossils. As with the Republic material, further specimen collecting uncovered fruits of Dipteronia present in the Florissant Formation, and so two years later Brown united those leaves and fruits. During his re-examination of western United States fossil floras, Brown (1937) redescribed the Florissant material as Dipteronia insignis, with commentary on the variable nature of Dipteronia foliage explaining the synonymizing of Comptonia acutiloba and Rhus subrhomboidalis into the species.

The placement of the two Dipteronia species was not questioned until 1987 when a small monograph on the Klondike Mountain Formation angiosperm flora was published by Jack A. Wolfe and Wesley Wehr. By examining larger collections of material from several areas in Northern Ferry County, combined with the older Eocene age of the sites, and fossils showing three fruits connected rather than the modern two typical of Dipteronia, Wolfe and Wehr decided to move the species. They noted that the leaf figured by Brown in 1935 was in fact a Rhus malloryi sumac, but the 1929 leaf pair which he also included in the description was from the species and so designated the 1929 leaves as the lectotype of "D" americana. They argued that the triple fruit condition in combination with the different leaf venation seen in the fossils excluded them from Dipteronia. They chose to erect a new genus for the 2 species which they named Bohlenia, placing Bohlenia americana as the type species, and including B. insignis as an additional member. In addition to the two species, they chose to include Berry's 1926 Myrica uglowi within Bohlenia as well, but they were of the opinion that it was very similar to the Florissant species and deemed M. uglowi a jr synonym of B. insignis. The isolated fruits from two other localities were also tentatively included in a broad B. insignis. Fruits from the Ruby flora of Montana and the Bridge Creek flora of Oregon, both of which are Oligocene in age. They deemed the poorly preserved leaflet from Bridge Creek as more likely a Rhus leaf and excluded it from possibly being Bohlenia. Based on the fruit being born in threes and a general similarity of leaf venation, Wolfe and Wehr placed Bohlenia in the soapberry family tribe Paulinieae, rejecting a placement near Dipteronia, which at that time was in the separate maple family.

The circumscription organized by Wolfe and Wehr lasted until 2001 when the fruits were split out and placed into a separate species. Based on the lack of any fossils preserving the fruits and leaves in attachment, paleobotanists Amy McClain and Steven Manchester reduced the circumscription for Bohlenia to only include the leaves, and moved the fruits to a single species, Dipteronia brownii. This also removed the larger geographic distribution of Bohlenia which the fruits had granted, as only the two Okanagan Highlands sites, the Klondike Mountain Formation and Chu Chua Formation, plus the Florissant Formation had leaves matching Wolfe and Wehrs description. McClain and Manchester noted that the leaves are similar in appearance to the modern species Koelreuteria elegans, being smaller than Dipteronia foliage with venation that is not similar.

Family placement wasn't readdressed until a paper by paleobotanists Nathan A. Jud et al. was published in 2021 and exploring the history of tribe Paulinieae. As part of their review, they rejected the inclusion of Bohlenia in Paulinieae, identifying it as an incertae sedis Sapindaceae genus.

The name Bohlenia was coined as a matronym honoring Wolfe's high school biology teacher Anne Bohlen. She was chosen in recognition of her work inspiring a young Wolfe to go into paleobotany and for the 1972 honor of being named Oregon's "Biology Teacher of the Year".

== Description ==
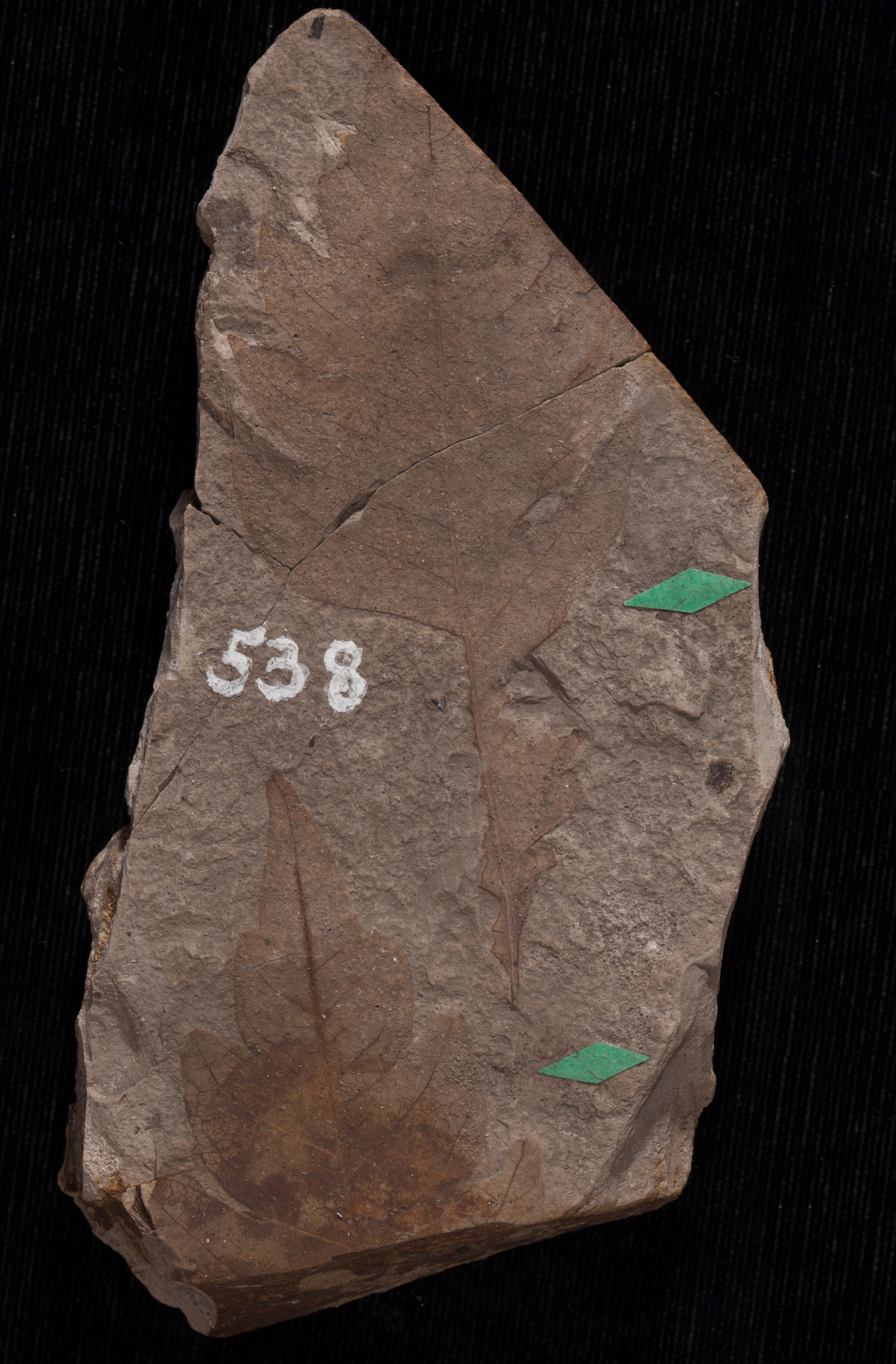
Bohlenia insignis holotype USNM-P538

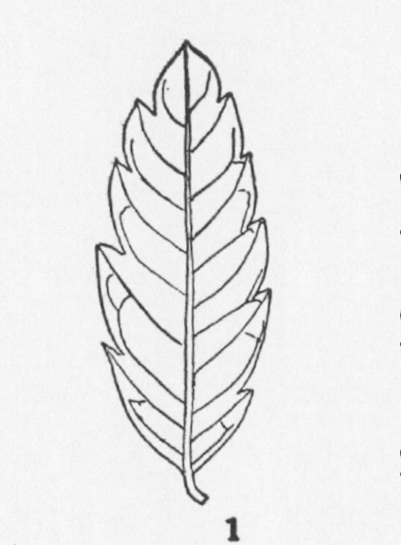
"Myrica uglowi" holotype

The leaves of Bohlenia are thought to have been compound with pinnately placed leaflets. The leaflets have a weak to strongly asymmetrical base and centrally positioned petiole. The margins are serrate and have both simple and compound teeth. Venation of the leaflets is pinnate with a single central main vein running base to apex. Secondary veins branch from the main vein in an alternating pattern, and the major secondaries run to the tooth tips, while minor secondaries fork with branches turning basally and apically. Tertiary veins present between the secondaries run towards the next secondary apically or basally and merge with tertiaries sprouted from that secondary near the mid pint between them.

=== Bohlenia americana ===
Bohlenia americana leaflets are elliptical with symmetrical middle and apical regions, changing to a strongly asymmetric base that is expanded on one side of the petiole while narrowed on the other. The leaflet margins are lobed with up to two teeth on the basal side of each rounded lobe tip. The apical sides of each lobe are slightly convex running in toward the leaf center at low angle. The leaflets secondary veins branch from the primary at angle saveraging between 45–60°, though the angle can reach up to 75°. the secondaries are irregularly placed along the primary vein, with alternating secondary pairs broadly looping out and upwards into the lobes to terminate in the upper tooth. The secondaries aligned with the sinuses between each lobe branch at close to the sinus with the basal fork curving into the lower lobe to join the next basal secondary there. The apical branch curves parallel to the lobe margin upwards to the next secondary apically when they merge. Intersecondaries are present, but not well preserved, and no higher venation is preserved at all.

=== Bohlenia insignis ===
Bohlenia insignis, as described by Lesquereux (1876) has leaves averaging an estimated 4 cm (1.6 in) in width and 10 cm (3.9 in) in length, though no full specimens were known at that time. The leaflets are oblong to narrowly oval with acute apex and thin to filmy texture. The lobes are distinctly triangular in outline with an upturned tip, contrasting with the rounded lobes of Okanagan highlands leaves. The secondary veins run fairly straight from the primary vein and then curve upwards when entering the lobes. The secondaries aligned with lobe sinuses branch with a similar habit as seen in B. americana. The intersecondaries and tertiary veins form large polygonal areoles.

=== Cf. Bohlenia insignis or "Myrica uglowi" ===
As originally described by Berry (1926), leaves of "Myrica uglowi" are generally small, with the average of the specimens being 2.5 cm (0.98 in) long by 1 cm (0.39 in) wide. They have an elongated elliptical outline with slightly pointed apex and wide wedge shaped base. The texture of was estimated to be sub-leathery and still flexible. The petioles are stout and short at an average 1.5 mm (0.059 in) long. Berry did not consider the leaves fully lobed, but having up to four enlarged on each side of lamina, with sinuses extending to about 1/3 of the lamina width. The lobules are similar to those of the other species with a slight asymmetry and upwards curved tips. While the veins are overall described as stout, and notably prominent on the underside of leaves, the secondaries follow the same footprint as the other two species, though they have a lower average angle of divergence at just over 45°.

== Paleoenvironment ==
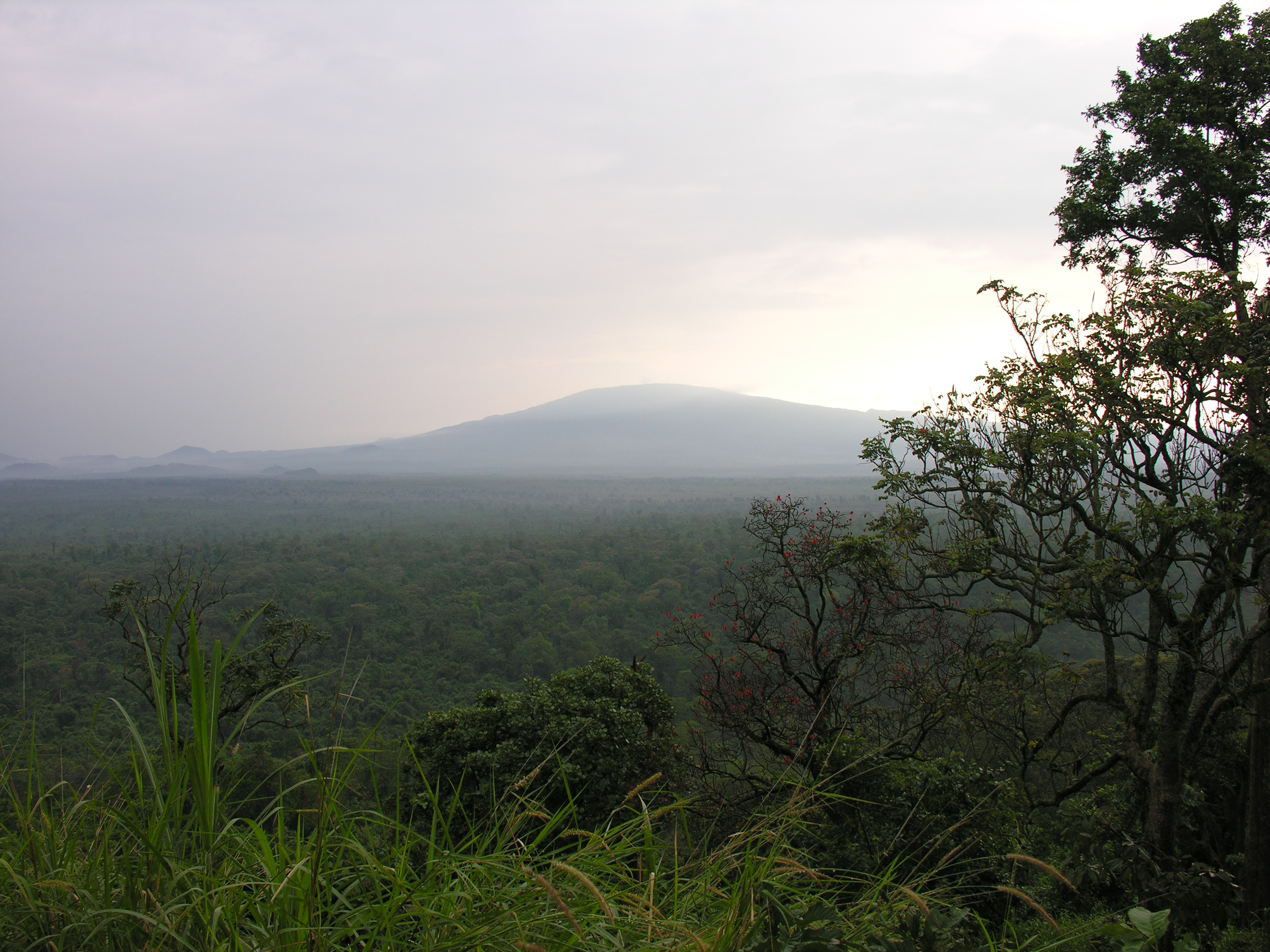
Virunga National Park, Albertine Rift, Africa

The Republic and Chu Chua sites are part of a larger fossil site system collectively known as the Eocene Okanagan Highlands. The highlands, including the Early Eocene formations between Driftwood Canyon at the north and Republic at the south, have been described as one of the "Great Canadian Lagerstätten" based on the diversity, quality and unique nature of the paleofloral and paleofaunal biotas that are preserved. The highlands temperate biome preserved across a large transect of lakes recorded many of the earliest appearances of modern genera, while also documenting the last stands of ancient lines. The warm temperate highland floras in association with downfaulted lacustrine basins and active volcanism are noted to have no exact modern equivalents. This is due to the more seasonally equitable conditions of the Early Eocene, resulting in much lower seasonal temperature shifts. However, the highlands have been compared to the upland ecological islands of the Virunga Mountains within the African rift valleys Albertine Rift.

The Chu Chua and Klondike Mountain Formations represent a long upland lake system series that was surrounded by a warm temperate ecosystem with nearby volcanism dating from during and just after the early Eocene climatic optimum. The Okanagan Highlands likely had a mesic upper microthermal to lower mesothermal climate, in which winter temperatures rarely dropped low enough for snow, and which were seasonably equitable. The paleoforest surrounding the lakes have been described as precursors to the modern temperate broadleaf and mixed forests of Eastern North America and Eastern Asia. Based on the fossil biotas the lakes were higher and cooler then the coeval coastal forests preserved in the Puget Group and Chuckanut Formation of Western Washington, which are described as lowland tropical forest ecosystems. Estimates of the paleoelevation range between 0.7 and 1.2 km (0.43 and 0.75 mi) higher than the coastal forests. This is consistent with the paleoelevation estimates for the lake systems, which range between 1.1 and 2.9 km (1,100 and 2,900 m), which is similar to the modern elevation 0.8 km (0.50 mi), but higher.

Estimates of the mean annual temperature have been derived from climate leaf analysis multivariate program (CLAMP) analysis and leaf margin analysis (LMA) of the Republic paleoflora. The CLAMP results after multiple linear regressions gave a mean annual temperature of approximately 8.0 °C (46.4 °F), with the LMA giving 9.2 ± 2.0 °C (48.6 ± 3.6 °F). A bioclimatic-based estimate based on modern relatives of the taxa found at Republic suggested mean annual temperatures around 13.5 ± 2.2 °C (56.3 ± 4.0 °F). This is lower than the mean annual temperature estimates given for the coastal Puget Group, which is estimated to have been between 15 and 18.6 °C (59.0 and 65.5 °F). The bioclimatic analysis for Republic suggests a mean annual precipitation amount of 115 ± 39 cm (45 ± 15 in).

The Florissant paleoforest surrounding the lake has been described as similar to modern southeastern North America, with a number of taxa represented that are now found in the subtropics to tropics and confined to the old world. MacGinitie (1953) suggested a warm temperate climate based on the modern biogeographic relatives of the biota found in the formation. Modern estimates of the paleoelevation range between 1,900–4,133 m (6,234–13,560 ft), notably higher than the original estimates by MacGinitie of 300–900 m (980–2,950 ft). Estimates of the mean annual temperature for the Florissant Formation have been derived from climate leaf analysis multivariate program (CLAMP) analysis and modern forest equivalencies of the paleoflora. The results of the various methods have given a mean annual temperature rage between approximately 10.8–17.5 °C (51.4–63.5 °F), while the bioclimatic analysis for suggests mean annual precipitation amounts of 50 cm (20 in).
