= Dipteronia americana =

Dipteronia americana may refer to:

- Dipteronia brownii, fossil seeds first named as Dipteronia americana
- Bohlenia americana, fossil leaves first named as Dipteronia americana
- Rhus malloryi, fossil leaves first identified as Dipteronia americana, later reidentified as Rhus
