= Acer ferrignoi =

Acer ferrignoi Temporal range: Late Miocene

Scientific classification
- Kingdom: Plantae
- Clade: Tracheophytes
- Clade: Angiosperms
- Clade: Eudicots
- Clade: Rosids
- Order: Sapindales
- Family: Sapindaceae
- Genus: Acer
- Section: Acer sect. Rubra
- Species: †A. ferrignoi

Binomial name
- †Acer ferrignoi Wolfe & Tanai, 1987

Extinct species of maple

Acer ferrignoi is an extinct maple species in the family Sapindaceae described from a group of fossil leaves. The species is known from Miocene sediments exposed in Oregon, US. It is one of several extinct species belonging to the living section Rubra.

== History and classification ==
Acer ferrignoi is known from a small group of fossils from a late Miocene fossil site listed as USGS 9737. The site is located near Lolo Pass in the northern Oregon Cascade mountains. The fossils were first studied by paleobotanists Jack A. Wolfe of the United States Geological Survey, Denver office and Toshimasa Tanai of Hokkaido University. They determined that fossils belonged to an undescribed Acer section Eriocarpa species. Wolfe and Tanai published their 1987 type description for A. ferrignoi in the Journal of the Faculty of Science, Hokkaido University. The etymology of the chosen specific name ferrignoi is in recognition of James P. Ferrigno, who located and supplied access to collections of fossils housed in the Smithsonian Institutions National Museum of Natural History. At the time of description the A. ferrignoi holotype specimen, number NMNH 396125, along with the four paratypes were part of the National Museum of Natural History collections.

Wolfe and Tanai suggested A. ferrignoi may be a late Miocene descendant of Acer chaneyi which lived from the late Oligocene to the Middle Miocene before going extinct. While A. cheneyi leaves sometimes have three lobes as in A. ferrignoi, more often they were five lobed, which is not seen in A. ferrignoi. The similarity in the structure and concave outlines between the two species' lateral lobes were major factors in Wolfe and Tanai's suggestion of relation between the two species. Following the Acer taxonomy structure defined by Japanese botanist Ken Ogata, they placed the species and related fossils into the Acer section Eriocarpa. Later work on the systematics of the genus resulted in section Eriocarpa being included into section Rubra.

== Description ==
Leaves of Acer ferrignoi are simple in structure, with perfectly actinodromous vein structure and range from ovate to widely ovate in shape. The base of each leaf is rounded, with the petiole ranging up to 0.5 cm (0.20 in). The leaves are dissected into three lobes, with the lateral lobes being one-half to three-quarters as long as the median lobe. The median lobe is generally triangular in outline and the two lateral lobes are narrow and triangular. There are three primary veins with between three and ten secondary veins branching off from the outer primaries. The secondary veins branch from the primaries at angles of 40° to 70° and run straight to the margins or arch gradually with external vein forks that reach the margins.
