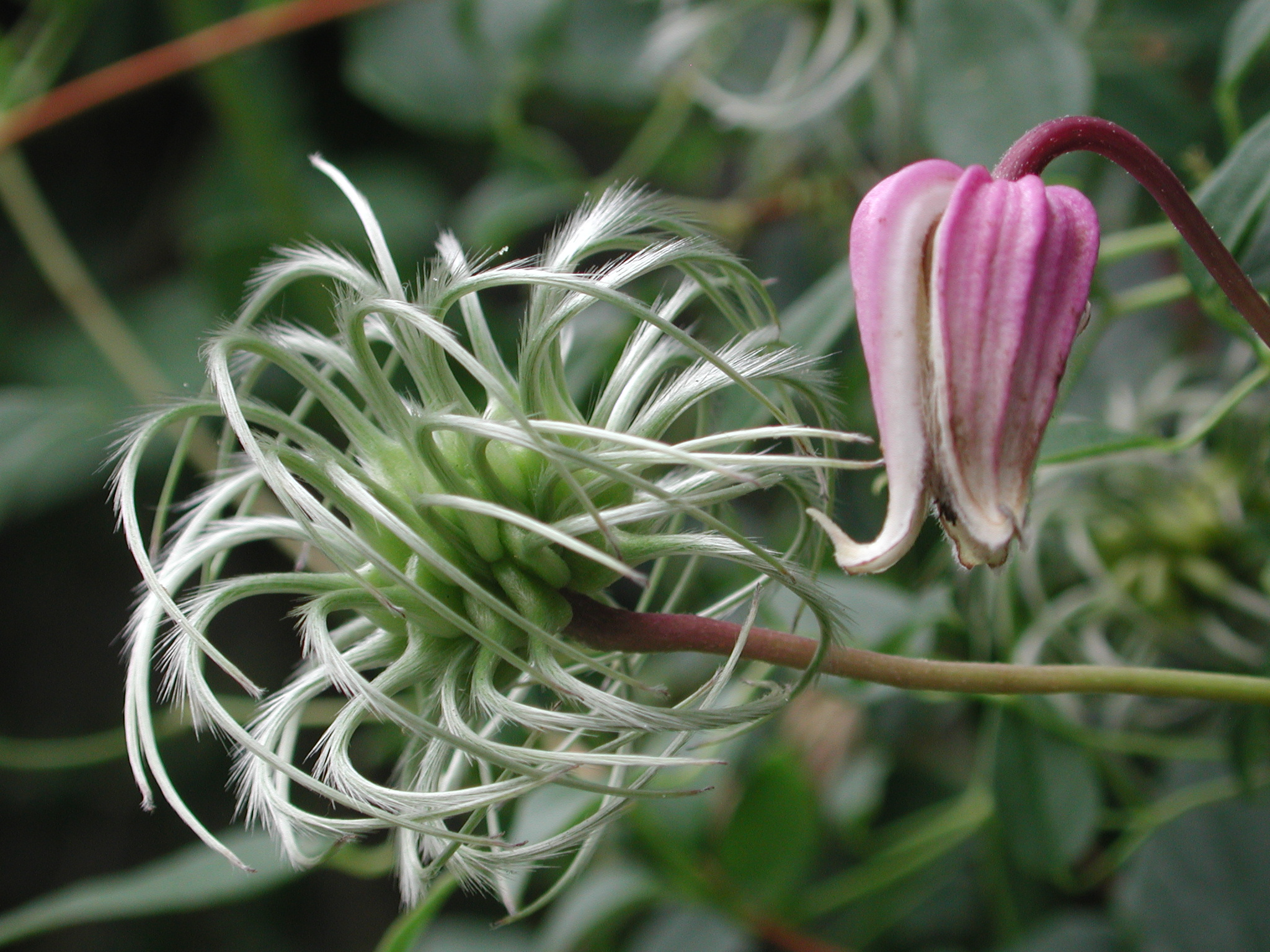

Scientific classification
- Kingdom: Plantae
- Clade: Tracheophytes
- Clade: Angiosperms
- Clade: Eudicots
- Order: Ranunculales
- Family: Ranunculaceae
- Genus: Clematis
- Species: C. reticulata

Binomial name
- Clematis reticulata Walter

Synonyms
- Coriflora reticulata; Viorna reticulata; Viorna subreticulata

= Clematis reticulata =

Species of flowering plant

Clematis reticulata, commonly known as the netleaf leather flower, is a species of flowering plant. Synonymous species names are Coriflora reticulata, Viorna reticulata, and Viorna subreticulata. It is in the Clematis genus and the Ranunculaceae (buttercup) family. It grows in the southeastern United States including parts of Florida and Alabama. It is a dicot with alternate leaves.
