= Klondike Mountain Formation =

Geological formation in Washington, United States

- Stratigraphic range: Eocene (Ypresian); 51.3–49 Ma
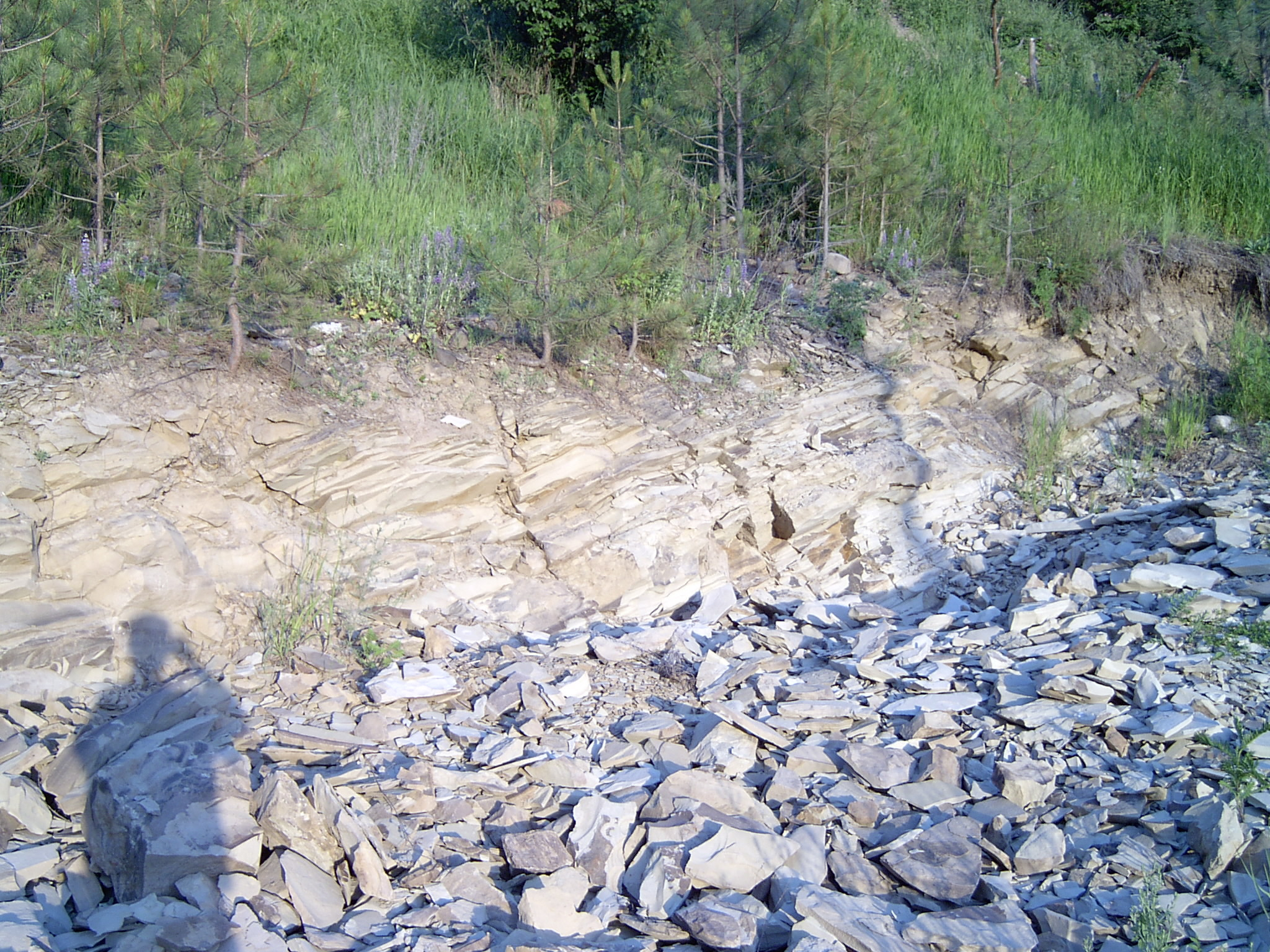
- Klondike Mountain Formation outcrop at site A0307
- Type: Geological formation
- Unit of: Okanagan Highlands
- Sub-units: Tom Thumb Tuff, Lower & Upper Members
- Underlies: Glacial deposits
- Overlies: Sanpoil Volcanics & others
- Thickness: up to 3,200 ft (980 m)

Lithology
- Primary: Variable
- Other: See text

Location
- Coordinates: 48.7°N 118.7°W
- Approximate paleocoordinates: 54.4°N 101.9°W
- Region: Okanagan highlands
- Country: United States
- Extent: Okanagan highlands

Type section
- Named for: Klondike Mountain
- Named by: Muessig
- Year defined: 1962
- Klondike Mountain Formation (the United States) Klondike Mountain Formation (Washington (state))

The Klondike Mountain Formation is an Early Eocene (Ypresian) geological formation located in the northeast central area of Washington state. The formation is composed of volcanic rocks in the upper unit and volcanic plus lacustrine (lakebed) sedimentation in the lower unit. The formation is named for the type location designated in 1962, Klondike Mountain northeast of Republic, Washington. The formation is a lagerstätte with exceptionally well-preserved plant and insect fossils, along with fossil epithermal hot springs.

The Klondike Mountain formation is the youngest in a series of formations which belong to the Challis Sequence volcanics, and is the southernmost of the Eocene Okanagan Highlands paleolake lagerstätten. The formation unconformably overlies rocks of the Eocene Sanpoil Volcanics and much older Triassic and Permian formations. The formation is bounded on its edges by a series of high-angle strike slip faults, which have contained the Klondike Mountain Formation in a series of graben structures, such as the Republic Graben. Public access to a fossiliferous outcrop at the north end of Republic is mediated by the nonprofit Stonerose Interpretive Center.

== Extent ==
The formation is located in northern Ferry County, Washington, with the majority of the sedimentation in the Republic and Curlew Basins on the east and in the Toroda Creek area to the northwest. The town of Republic, Washington is situated at the southern end of the formation, with outcrops within the city itself. The formation was named for Klondike Mountain which is just to the northeast of the city, and where the type locality is located. The Curlew basin is situated north of Republic, with the northern edge along the Kettle River and the community of Curlew, Washington near the northeastern edge.

The formation is the southernmost in the string of Eocene highland lakebeds that extend into British Columbia. The lake system, overlapping the modern Okanagan Highlands, extends from the Klondike Mountain Formation northwest approximately 1,000 kilometres (1,000,000 m) into central British Columbia. Closely correlated with and possibly representing the same lake sequence as the Klondike Mountain Formation are the Penticton Group's Kettle River, Marama and Marron Formations in the Boundary District along the Canada-United States border.

== Age ==
Early dating of the formation was based primarily on identification and correlation of the fossils found in the Tom Thumb Tuff, with Joseph Umpleby (1910) reporting a putative age of Early Miocene. This date was based on examination of fossils by C. R. Eastman, who thought them to be similar to those found in the Florissant Formation of Colorado, which at the time was also considered Miocene. This age was retained by Edward W. Berry (1929), who included the Klondike Mountain Formation fossil lakebeds as part of the Latah Formation. The age of the formation has been revised in the following hundred years, with Roland W. Brown (1936) identifying the deposits as being older than the Latah Formation. In a later written communication circa 1958, Brown again revised the age still older, stating the fossils found in the area of Mount Elizabeth indicated an Oligocene age. This age was used by Parker and Calkins (1964) for work on the Curlew Quadrangle of Ferry County. Work by Pearson and Obradovich (1977) refined the Sanpoil Volcanics age to around 52 to 51 million years ago, and a general age estimate for the Klondike Mountain Formation between 50.3 ± 1.7 million years ago and 42.3 ± 2.0 million years ago. Since then the fossil-bearing strata of the formation have been radiometrically dated to give an estimate of the Ypresian, the mid stage of the early Eocene,49.4 ± .5 million years ago, which was revised to an oldest age estimate of 51.2 ± 0.1 million years ago based on detrital zircon isotopic data published in 2021.

== Lithology ==
Parker and Calkins (1964) noted the association of the Klondike Mountain Formation with the gold and silver deposits of the Republic District and suggested it as a potential host to more ore deposits in the Curlew Quadrangle. The epithermal gold deposits occurring in the Sanpoil volcanics terminate directly below the unconformity where the volcanics contact the base of the Klondike Mountain Formation or sometimes penetrate into the Formation's lowest unit. Hydrothermal sinter deposits are known from the lowest portions of the Formation and are thought to represent hydrothermal eruption areas. In general the lower portions of the Formation have a large amount of hydrothermal alteration, and areas around vents are rich in pyrite and silica, two products of natural hydrothermal sintering. The areas above that show a transition to mudstones, siltstones and sandstones grading from fine-grained material into coarser materials moving up the strata column. The finely-bedded stones show the greatest numbers of fossils and the finest preservation of details.

== Paleoenvironment and paleoclimate ==
The lake bed sediments preserve a diverse array of plants, insects, and fishes, notably the biota called the Republic flora. The Okanagan lake system, which includes the Klondike Mountain Formation, has been classified as one of the great Canadian lagerstätten. The area likely had a mesic upper microthermal to lower mesothermal climate, in which winter temperatures rarely dropped low enough for snow, and which were seasonably equitable.

The Okanagan Highlands paleoforest surrounding the lakes have been described as precursors to the modern Temperate broadleaf and mixed forests of Eastern North America and Eastern Asia. Based on the fossil biotas the lakes were higher and cooler then the coeval coastal forests preserved in the Puget Group and Chuckanut Formation of Western Washington, which are described as lowland tropical forest ecosystems. Estimates of the paleoelevation are between 0.7 and 1.2 km (0.43 and 0.75 mi) higher than the coastal forests. This is consistent with the paleoelevation estimates for the lake systems, which range between 1.1 and 2.9 km (1,100 and 2,900 m), which is similar to the modern elevation 0.8 km (0.50 mi), but higher.

Estimates of the mean annual temperature have been derived from Climate leaf analysis multivariate program (CLAMP) and leaf margin analysis (LMA) of the Republic paleoflora. The CLAMP results after multiple linear regressions for Republic gave a mean annual temperature of approximately 8.0 °C (46.4 °F), while the LMA gave 9.2 ± 2.0 °C (48.6 ± 3.6 °F). This is lower than the mean annual temperature estimates given for the coastal Puget Group, which is estimated to have been between 15 and 18.6 °C (59.0 and 65.5 °F). The bioclimatic analysis for Republic suggests a mean annual precipitation amount of 115 ± 39 cm (45 ± 15 in).

== Paleobiota ==
The Klondike Mountain Formation is host to a highly diverse assemblage of plants and insects including some of the last records of taxa before extinction and the first appearances of taxa.
