= Scullya =

Scullya Temporal range: Capitanian

Scientific classification
- Domain: Eukaryota
- Kingdom: Animalia
- Phylum: Chordata
- Clade: Synapsida
- Clade: Therapsida
- Suborder: †Dinocephalia
- Family: †Titanosuchidae
- Genus: †Scullya; Broom, 1923
- Species: †S. gigas

Binomial name
- †Scullya gigas Broom, 1929

Extinct genus of therapsids

Scullya is an extinct genus of titanosuchian therapsids. It is known from a poorly preserved snout that shows no clear titanosuchian characters. The presence of teeth on the palate may be an anteosaurian character. It is considered an indeterminable specimen.

== See also ==
- List of therapsids
