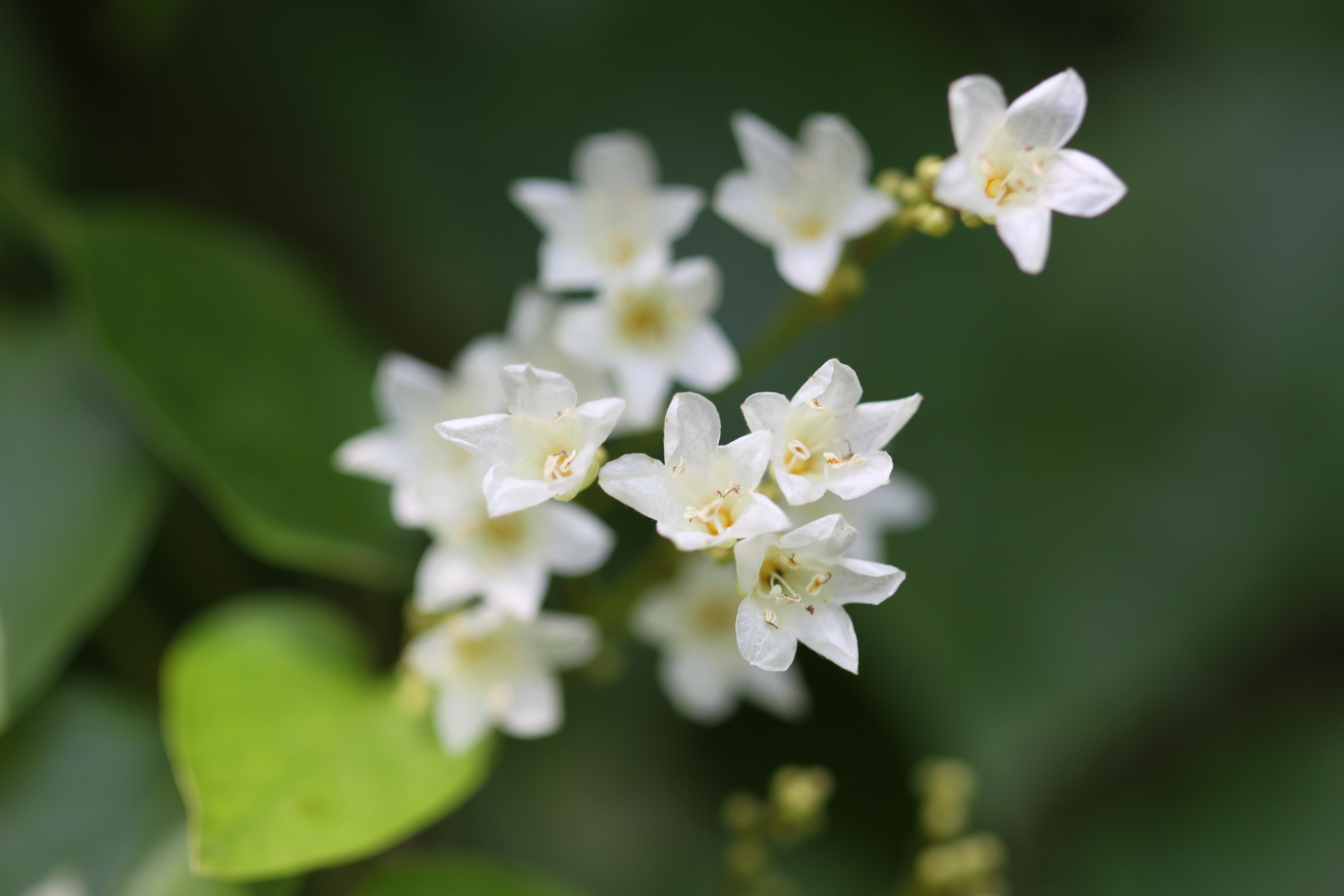
- Porana volubilis

Scientific classification
- Kingdom: Plantae
- Clade: Tracheophytes
- Clade: Angiosperms
- Clade: Eudicots
- Clade: Asterids
- Order: Solanales
- Family: Convolvulaceae
- Genus: Porana; Burm.f.

= Porana =

Genus of flowering plants

Porana is a genus of flowering plants belonging to the family Convolvulaceae.

Its native range is Indo-China to Malesia, Mexico.

Species:

- Porana nutans (Choisy) O'Donell
- Porana volubilis Burm.f.
