= Roland W. Brown =

US paleobotanist and geologist

Roland Wilbur Brown
- Born: May , 1893; Weatherly, Pennsylvania
- Died: December 21, 1961 (aged 68); Lehighton, Pennsylvania
- Education: Lafayette College, Johns Hopkins University
- Known for: Western North American paleobotany
- Scientific career
- Fields: Paleobotany
- Workplaces: Department of Geology; United States National Museum
- Thesis: (1926)
- Doctoral advisor: Edward Berry
- Author abbrev. (botany): R.W.Br.

Roland Wilbur Brown (1893–1961) was an American paleobotanist and geologist.

== Biography ==
Brown was born in 1893. In 1928, he was appointed as a geologist with the United States Geological Survey, where he remained until he retired in 1958. He also served as a Research Associate in the Department of Geology of the United States National Museum, starting from 1951 util his death in 1961. He studied Cenozoic and Mesozoic plants from western North America.

Roland Brown also was a linguistic scholar, and is widely known among taxonomists for his book, "Composition of Scientific Words", originally published in 1927 under the title "Materials for Word-Study" and reprinted in 1954, 1965, 1978, and 1985 under the latter title.

The standard author abbreviation R.W.Br. is used to indicate this person as the author when citing a botanical name.
