= Langhian =

Third age of the Miocene epoch

- 15.98 – 13.82 Ma
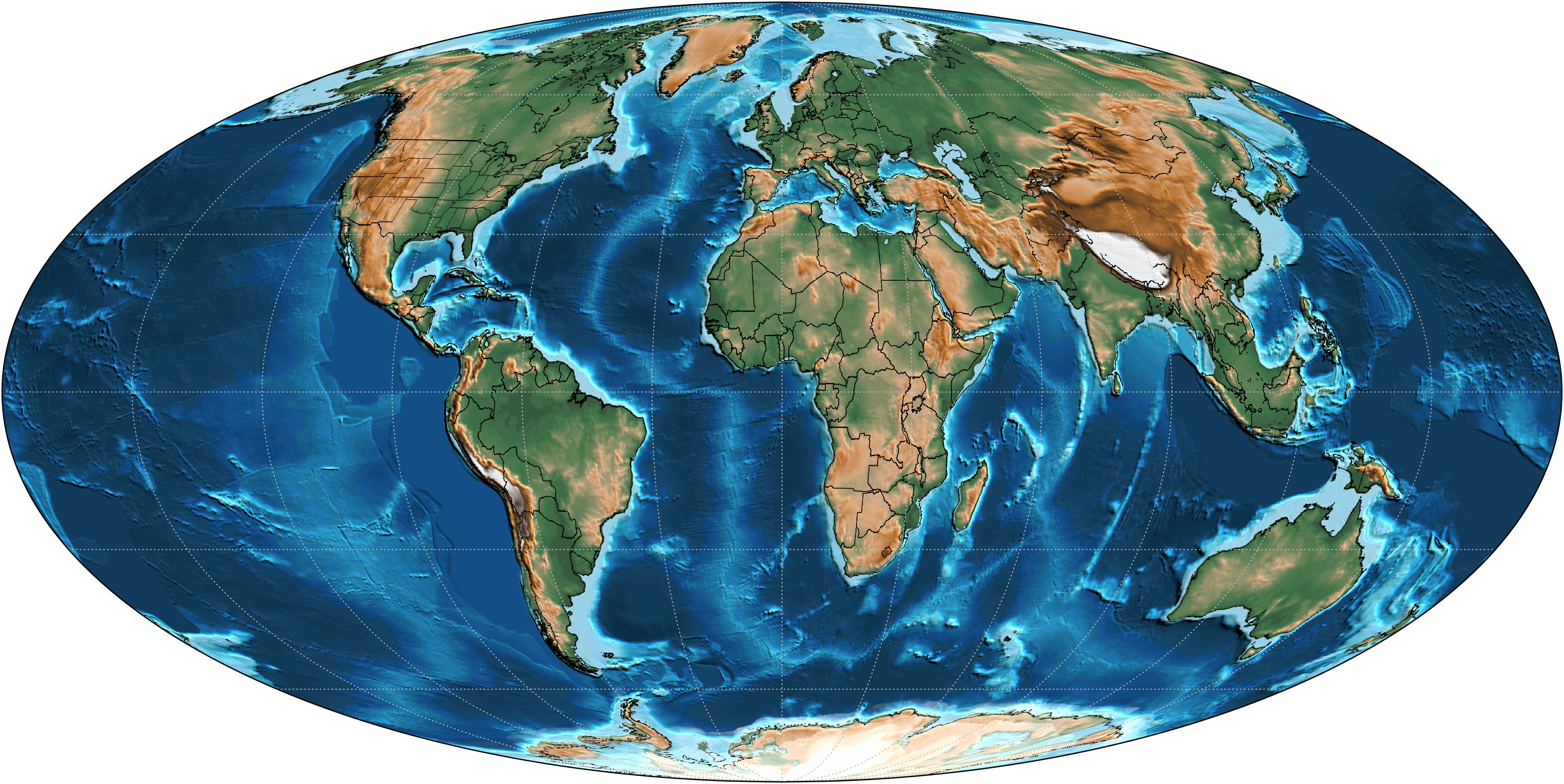
- A map of Earth as it appeared 15 million years ago during the Langhian Age.

Chronology
← / Messinian salinity crisis; ← / North American prairie expands
Subdivision of the Neogene according to the ICS, as of 2024. Vertical axis scale: Millions of years ago
- Formerly part of: Tertiary Period/System

Etymology
- Name formality: Formal

Usage information
- Celestial body: Earth
- Regional usage: Global (ICS)
- Time scale(s) used: ICS Time Scale

Definition
- Chronological unit: Age
- Stratigraphic unit: Stage
- Time span formality: Formal
- Lower boundary definition: Not formally defined
- Lower boundary definition candidates: Near top of magnetic polarity chronozone C5Cn.1n; Near FAD of the Planktonic Foraminiferan Praeorbulina glomerosa
- Lower boundary GSSP candidate section(s): La Vedova, Italy; St. Peter's Pool, Malta; Astronomically tuned ODP-core
- Upper boundary definition: Mi3b Oxygen-isotopic event (Global cooling episode)
- Upper boundary GSSP: Ras il Pellegrin section, Fomm ir-Riħ Bay, Malta; 35.9139°N 14.3361°E
- Upper GSSP ratified: 2007

In the ICS geologic timescale, the Langhian is an age or stage in the middle Miocene Epoch/Series. It spans the time between 15.98 Ma and 13.82 (million years ago) during the Middle Miocene.

The Langhian was a continuing warming period defined by Lorenzo Pareto in 1865, it was originally established in the Langhe area north of Ceva in northern Italy, hence the name. The Langhian is preceded by the Burdigalian and followed by the Serravallian Stage.

== Stratigraphic definition ==
The base of the Langhian is defined by the first appearance of foraminifer species Praeorbulina glomerosa and is also coeval with the top of magnetic chronozone C5Cn.1n. A GSSP for the Langhian Stage was not yet established in 2009.

The top of the Langhian Stage (the base of the Serravallian Stage) is at the first occurrence of fossils of the nanoplankton species Sphenolithus heteromorphus and is located in magnetic chronozone C5ABr.

The Langhian is coeval with the Orleanian and Astaracian European Land Mammal Mega Zones (more precisely: with biozones MN5 and MN6, MN6 starts just below the Langhian-Serravallian boundary), with the upper Hemingfordian to mid-Barstovian North American Land Mammal Ages, with mid-Relizian to Luisian Californian regional stages (the Luisian extends barely into the early Serravallian), with the early-mid Badenian Paratethys stage of Central and eastern Europe, with the Tozawan stage in Japan (which runs barely into the early Serravallian), with the late Batesfordian through Balcombian to early Bairnsdalian Australian stages and with the mid-Cliffdenian to mid-Lillburnian New Zealand stages.

== Paleontology ==
=== Reptiles ===
- Turtles: Meiolania brevicollis

=== Cartilaginous fish ===
Sharks, rays, skates and relatives

- Chlamydoselachidae: †Chlamydoselachus tobleri
- Hexanchidae: Hexanchus griseus (includes "H. andersoni" and "H. gigas"), Hexanchus nakamurai (includes "H. vitulus"), Notorynchus cepedianus (includes "N. kempi" and "N. primigenius")

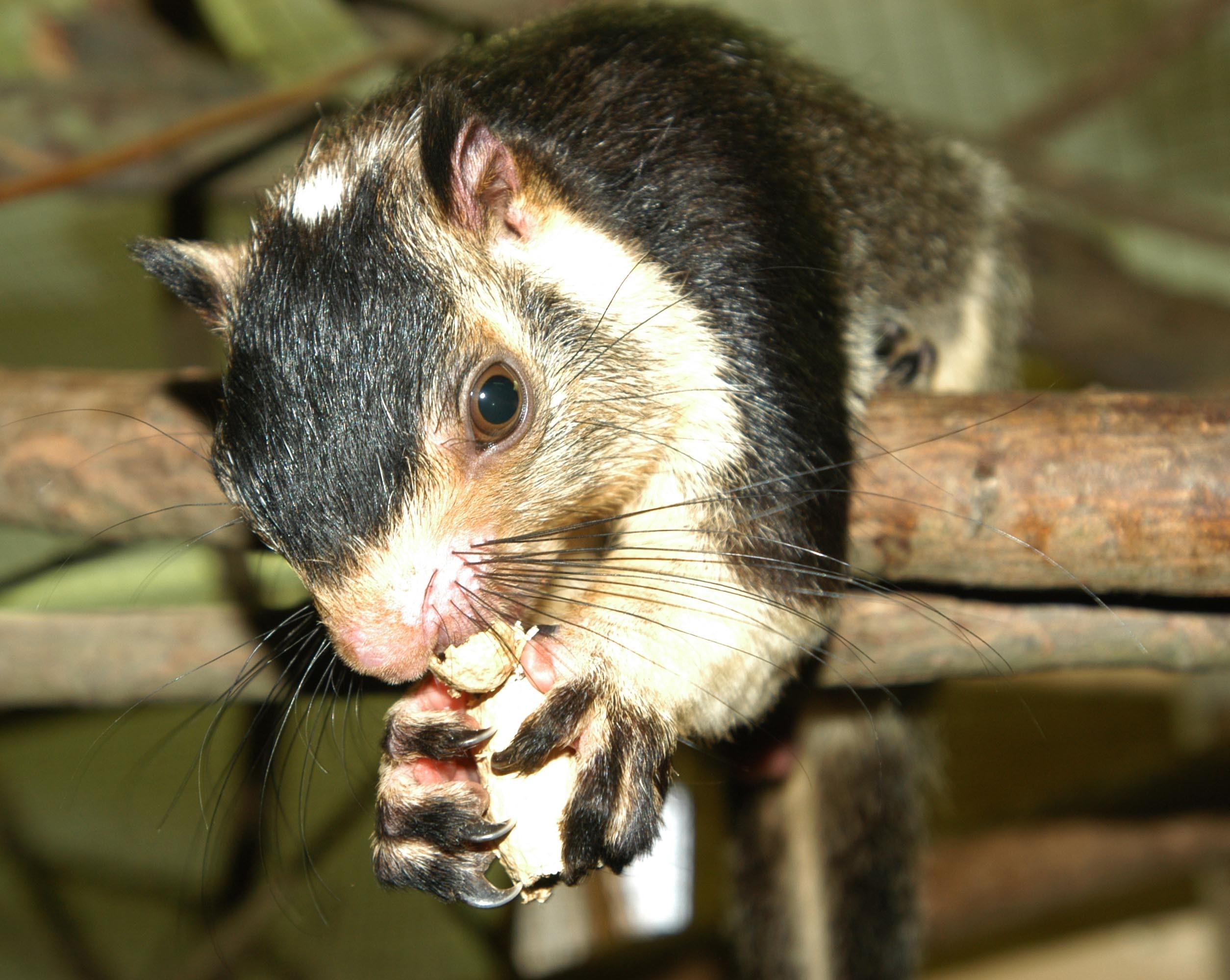
Grizzled Giant Squirrel, Ratufa macroura. Its genus was probably already distinct in the Langhian.

=== Mammals ===
- Perissodactyla
  - Rhinocerotidae: †Dicerorhinus sansaniensis
- Rodentia
  - Cricetidae: †Karydomys
  - Sciuridae: †Palaeosciurus, ?Ratufa

== Climate ==
In August 2021, the 6th IPCC report indicated that global temperature was 4°C– 10°C warmer during the Miocene Climatic Optimum (16.9-14.7 Ma ago) than 1850-1900.

== See also ==
- Middle Miocene disruption
- Nördlinger Ries impact crater
