= Latah Formation =

Sedimentary deposits in western United States

- Stratigraphic range: 21.3–12.1 Ma Early to Middle Miocene
- Type: Geological formation
- Sub-units: Clarkia fossil beds
- Underlies: Columbia River Basalts
- Overlies: Columbia River Basalts
- Area: 175 miles (282 km) by 75 miles (121 km)
- Thickness: up to 300 ft (91 m)

Lithology
- Primary: shales
- Other: gravels, ashes

Location
- Location: Eastern Washington, northwestern Idaho, & northeastern Oregon
- Region: Pacific Northwest
- Country: United States
- Extent: Columbia Plateau

Type section
- Named by: Pardee & Kirk Bryan, 1926
- Year defined: 1926
- Region: Spokane, Washington
- Country: United States

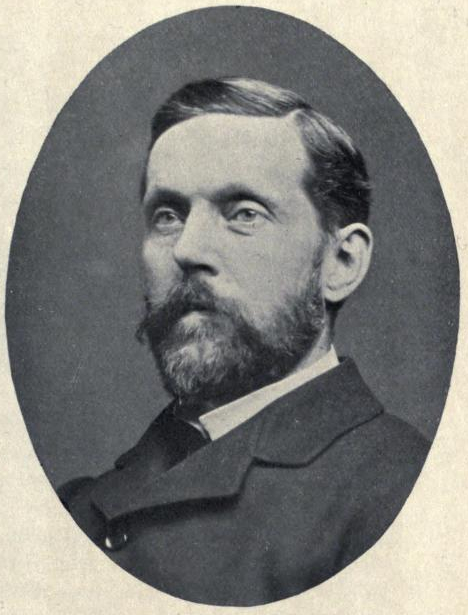
Paleobotanist Frank Hall Knowlton

The Latah Formation is a series of late Miocene lacustrine sedimentary deposits which outcrop in eastern Washington and northwestern Idaho. The lake beds are interbedded with igneous rock of the Columbia River Basalt Group. The formation was originally detailed from a site in Spokane, Washington by Dr. Kirk Bryan in a 1923 talk, and then formally described in a 1926 journal article by Joseph Pardee and Bryan. When first described the formation was thought to have predated the deposition of the Columbia River Basalts, however further investigation showed them to be interbedded, being laid down in successive events. Potassium-argon dating of the formation returned an age range of 21.3 to 12.1 million years old, indicating an Early to Middle Miocene age range. Numerous fossil plants and insects have been recovered from the formation and described. The Latah Formation includes the Clarkia fossil beds in Idaho.
