= Frank Knowlton =

American paleontologist

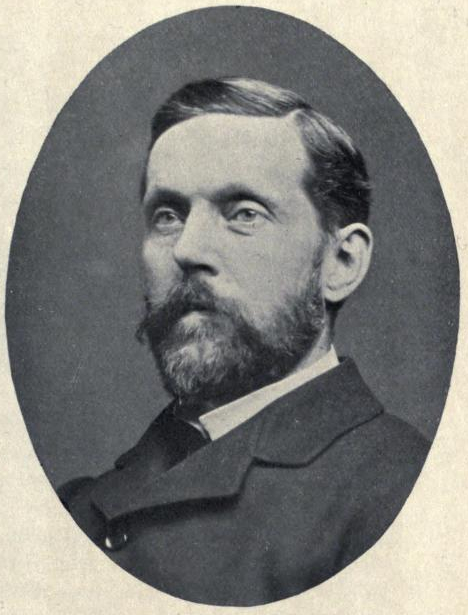

Frank Hall Knowlton (September 2, 1860 - November 22, 1926) was an American botanist, ornithologist and naturalist. Born in Vermont, he joined the Geological Survey and took an interest in fossil plants in the local lignite, later becoming a specialist in paleobotany.

He was born in Brandon, Vermont to a family of old settlers. He went to study at Middlebury College where he took an interest in natural history, influenced by Ezra Brainerd and Henry M. Seely. He received a BS in 1884 and an MS in 1887. He visited the US National Museum in Washington in 1884, while preparing an exhibit for the World Cotton Centennial in New Orleans and came in contact with palaeobotanist Lester F. Ward there. He later became an assistant to Ward on the Geology Survey, during which time he studied fossil wood in the lignites of the Potomac. He joined the Geological Survey as an assistant paleontologist in 1894 and was promoted geologist in 1907. He joined the Columbian College as a professor of botany and received a PhD in 1896. He received a ScD in 1921. He founded the journal The Plant World in 1897 and edited it for its first seven years.

Knowlton was also interested in birds and in 1909 he produced Birds of the World published as part of the American Nature Series from Holt. His work on Mesozoic and Cenozoic plants occupied much of his research.
