= Edward W. Berry =

American paleobotanist (1875–1945)

Edward Wilber Berry
- Born: February 10, 1875; Newark, New Jersey
- Died: September 20, 1945 (aged 70); Stonington, Connecticut
- Education: Johns Hopkins University
- Awards: Walker Prize (1901); Mary Clark Thompson Medal (1942)
- Scientific career
- Fields: Paleontology; Botany; Paleobotany
- Workplaces: Johns Hopkins University
- Author abbrev. (botany): E.W. Berry

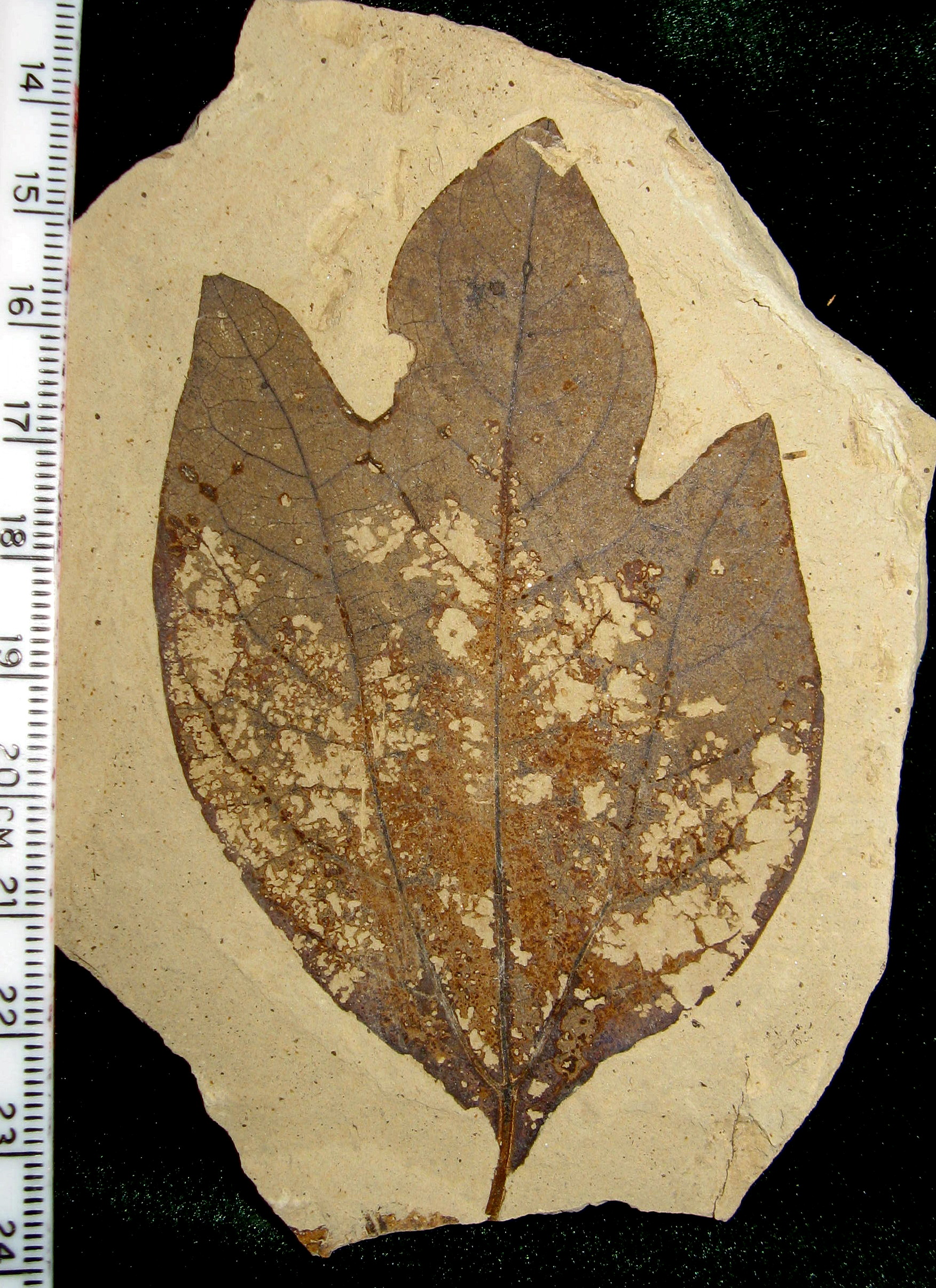
Sassafras hesperia, an Eocene species described by Berry

Edward Wilber Berry (February 10, 1875 – September 20, 1945) was an American paleontologist and botanist; the principal focus of his research was paleobotany.

== Early life ==
Berry was born February 10, 1875, in Newark, New Jersey, and finished high school in 1890 at the age of 15.

== Career ==
Berry studied North and South American flora and published taxonomic studies with theoretical reconstructions of paleoecology and phytogeography. He started his scientific career as an amateur scientist, working with William Bullock Clark as a lab assistant in 1905. At Johns Hopkins University he held various positions including teacher, research scientist, scientific editor, provost, and dean. Berry was appointed geologist with the U. S. Geological Survey in 1910 along with the post of assistant state geologist for Maryland in 1917, both positions he kept until retiring in 1942.

== Major expeditions ==
- 1919: co-leader, Johns Hopkins George H. Williams Memorial Expedition, Andes Mountains
- 1927: geological expedition to Peru and Ecuador
- 1933: geological expedition to Venezuela

== Participation in scientific societies ==
- 1924: president, Paleontological Society of America
- 1945: president, Geological Society of America

== Selected bibliography ==
- 1916. The Lower Eocene Floras of Southeastern North America
- 1924. The Middle and Upper Eocene floras of Southeastern North America. U.S. Geological Survey Professional Paper 92
- 1925. Berry, E. W. (1925). "A species of Musa in the Tertiary of South America". PNAS. 11 (6): 298–299. Bibcode:1925PNAS...11..298B. doi:10.1073/pnas.11.6.298. PMC 1085991. PMID 16587004.
- 1929. Berry, E. W. (Apr 1929). "An Eocene forest in the Peruvian desert". PNAS. 15 (4): 345–346. doi:10.1073/pnas.15.4.345. PMC 522462. PMID 16587479.
- 1929. Berry, E. W. (Jun 1929). "Fossil plants and mountain uplifts in the Pacific states". PNAS. 15 (6): 477–480. Bibcode:1929PNAS...15..477B. doi:10.1073/pnas.15.6.477. PMC 522493. PMID 16577207.
- 1934. Berry, E. W. (1934). "Miocene Patagonia". PNAS. 20 (5): 280–282. Bibcode:1934PNAS...20..280B. doi:10.1073/pnas.20.5.280. PMC 1076401. PMID 16587887.
- 1937. Berry, E. W. (1937). "Succession of fossil floras in Patagonia". PNAS. 23 (10): 537–542. Bibcode:1937PNAS...23..537B. doi:10.1073/pnas.23.10.537. PMC 1076984. PMID 16577811.

== Awards and honors ==
- 1901: Walker Prize, Boston Society of Natural History
- 1919: Member of the American Philosophical Society
- 1921: Fellow of the American Academy of Arts and Sciences
- 1922: Member of the National Academy of Sciences
- 1930: honorary doctorate by Lehigh University
- 1942: Mary Clark Thompson Medal from the National Academy of Sciences
