= 1952 in paleobotany =

This paleobotany list records new fossil plant taxa that were to be described during the year 1952, as well as notes other significant paleobotany discoveries and events which occurred during 1952.

== Mosses ==
Name	Novelty	Status	Authors	Age	Unit	Location	Synonymized taxa	Notes	Images
Archaeomnium arnoldianum	Comb nov	jr synonym	(Steere) LaMotte	Miocene	"Carter Creek"	United States; Oregon		A moss. Moved from Palaeohypnum arnoldianum (1947); Moved to Hypnites arnoldianum in 1980	
Archaeomnium brittoniae	Comb nov	jr synonym	(Steere) LaMotte	Miocene	Latah Formation	United States; Washington		A moss. Moved from Palaeohypnum brittoniae (1947); Moved to Hypnites brittoniae in 1980	
Archaeomnium brownii	Comb nov	jr synonym	(Kirchner) LaMotte	Eocene; Priabonian	Florissant Formation	United States; Colorado		A moss. Moved from Palaeohypnum brownii (1947); First named Hypnum brownii (1898); Moved to Hypnites brownii in 1980	
Archaeomnium knowltoni	Comb nov	jr synonym	(E. G. Britton) LaMotte	Eocene	Roslyn Formation	United States; Washington		A moss. Moved from Palaeohypnum knowltoni (1947); First named Rhynchostegium knowltoni (1899); Moved to Hypnites knowltoni in 1980	

== Ferns ==
Name	Novelty	Status	Authors	Age	Unit	Location	Synonymized taxa	Notes	Images
Athyrium crossii	Comb nov		(Knowlton) LaMotte	Paleocene	Denver Formation	United States; Colorado	Diplaiium mulleri (1874)	A lady fern species. Moved from Diplazium crossii (1930); First named Asplenium (Diplaiium) crossii (1890)	
Cyathea branneri	Comb nov		(Hollick & Berry) LaMotte	"Tertiary"		Brazil		A tree fern species. Moved from Hemitelia branneri (1924)	
Cyathea pinnata	Comb nov	jr synonym	(MacGinitie) LaMotte	Eocene	Ione Formation	United States; California		A tree fern species. Moved from Hemitelia pinnata (1941); Synonymized into Cyathea inequilateralis in 1977	Cyathea inequilateralis
Dryopteris claiborniana	Comb nov		(Berry) LaMotte	Eocene	Yegua Formation	United States; Louisiana		A wood fern species Moved from Goniopteris claiborniana (1917)	
Dryopteris escheri	Comb nov		(Heer) LaMotte	Miocene		Switzerland		A wood fern species Moved from Aspidium escheri (1855)	
Dryopteris guyottii	Comb nov		(Lesquereux) LaMotte	Eocene; Priabonian	Florissant Formation	United States; Colorado		A wood fern species Moved from Phegopteris guyottii (1908); First named Sphenopteris guyottii (1883)	
Dryopteris heerii	Comb nov		(Ettingshausen) LaMotte					A wood fern species Moved from Aspidium heerii (1865)	
Dryopteris lesquereuxi	Comb nov		(Berry) LaMotte	Eocene	Lysite Formation	United States; Wyoming	synonymy: Lastrea (Goniopteris) fischeri (1883) pro part; Lastrea (Goniopteris) knightiana (1883) nomen nudum	A wood fern species Moved from Goniopteris lesquereuxi (1932)	
Dryopteris ursinum	Comb nov		(Unger) LaMotte	Miocene		Switzerland		A wood fern species Moved from Lastrea (Phegopteris) stiriaca (1855)	
Dryopteris ursinum	Comb nov		(Heer) LaMotte	Paleocene		Greenland		A wood fern species Moved from Aspidium ursinum (1869)	

== Cycadophytes ==
Name	Novelty	Status	Authors	Age	Unit	Location	Synonymized taxa	Notes	Images
Ctenis hamiltonensis	Comb nov		(Hollick) LaMotte	Paleocene/Eocene	"Hamilton Bay flora"	USA; Alaska		A Ctenis species. Moved from Anthrophyopsis hamiltonensis (1936)	
Zamites pollardi	Comb nov		(Hollick) LaMotte	Paleocene	Fort Union Formation	USA; Wyoming		A Zamites species morphospecies. Moved from Magnolia (?) pollardi (1899)	

== Conifers ==
=== Cupressaceae ===
Name	Novelty	Status	Authors	Age	Unit	Location	Synonymized taxa	Notes	Images
Callitris helvetica	Comb nov		(Heer) LaMotte	Miocene		Switzerland		A Callitris species. Moved from Widdringtonia helvetica (1855)	
Juniperus linguaefolia	Comb nov		(Lesquereux) LaMotte	Eocene; Priabonian	Florissant Formation	USA; Colorado		A juniper species. Moved from Sabina linguaefolia (1908); First described as Widdringtonia linguaefolia (1883)	
Thuja naujatica	Comb et sp nom nov		(Heer) LaMotte	Paleocene		Denmark; Greenland		A hiba species. New species name for Thujopsis gracilis (1920); First described as Thuja (Thujopsis) gracilis (Heer) (1883)	

== Flowering plants ==
=== Nymphales ===
Name	Novelty	Status	Authors	Age	Unit	Location	Synonymized taxa	Notes	Images
Nymphaea leei	Comb nov		(Knowlton) LaMotte	Paleocene	Raton Formation	USA; Colorado		A waterlily species First described as Castalia leei (1917)	
Nymphaea pulchella	Comb nov		(Knowlton) LaMotte	Paleocene	Dawson Arkose	USA; Colorado		A waterlily species First described as Castalia pulchella (1930)	

=== Magnoliids ===
Name	Novelty	Status	Authors	Age	Unit	Location	Synonymized taxa	Notes	Images
Beilschmiedia portoricensis	Comb nov		(Hollick) LaMotte	Miocene	Collazo Shale	USA; Puerto Rico		A Beilschmiedia species. Moved from Hufetandta portoricensis (1928); First named Aniba portoricensis (1928)	
Laurophyllum grandis	Comb nov		(Lesquereux) LaMotte	Miocene	Neroly Formation	USA; California	synonymy: Laurus fremontensis (1930); Laurophyllum fremontensis (1941)	A lauraceous species. Moved from Laurus grandis (1883)	
Lindera antiqua	Comb nov		(Heer) LaMotte	Miocene		Switzerland		A spicewood species First described as Benzoin antiquum (1856)	
Lindera dilleri	Comb nov		(Knowlton) LaMotte	Miocene		USA; Oregon		A spicewood species First described as Benzoin dilleri (1900)	
Litsea lamarensis	Comb nov		(Knowlton) LaMotte	Eocene		USA; Wyoming		A Litsea species First described as Malapoenna lamarensis (1899)	
Litsea lata	Comb nov	jr synonym	(MacGinitie) LaMotte	Eocene	Ione Formation	USA; California		A lauraceous relative First described as Neolitsea lata (1941); Moved to Cinnamomophyllum latum in 1977	Cinnamomophyllum latum
Litsea praecursoria	Comb nov		(Lesquereux) LaMotte	Paleocene	Fort Union Formation	USA; North Dakota		A lauraceous relative First described as Tetranthera praecursoria (1883)	
Litsea sagittata	Comb nov		(Ball) LaMotte	Eocene	Wilcox Formation	USA; Texas		A Litsea species First described as Malapoenna sagittata (1939)	
Litsea sessiliflora	Comb nov		(Lesquereux) LaMotte	Eocene	Wilcox Formation	USA; Texas	Tetranthera sessiliflora (1878)	A Litsea species Moved from Malapoenna sessiliflora (1898); First described as Laurus sessiliflora (1874)	
Litsea texensis	Comb nov		(Ball) LaMotte	Eocene	Indio Formation	USA; Texas		A Litsea species First described as Malapoenna sagittata (1931)	
Ocotea alia	Sp nom nov		LaMotte	Eocene	Wilcox Formation	USA; Arkansas	Andromeda delicatida (of Hollick, 1899)	An Ocotea species A replacement name for Mespilodaphne coushatta (Berry, 1916) (1916)	
Ocotea athenensis	Comb nov		(Ball) LaMotte	Eocene	Wilcox Formation	USA; Texas		An Ocotea species Moved from Mespilodaphne athenensis (1939)	
Ocotea attenuata	Comb nov		(Ball) LaMotte	Eocene	Wilcox Formation	USA; Texas		An Ocotea species Moved from Mespilodaphne attenuata (1939)	
Ocotea berryana	Sp nom nov		LaMotte	Eocene	Lagrange Formation	USA; Tennessee		An Ocotea species A replacement name for Mespilodaphne puryearensis (Berry, 1916) (1916)	
Ocotea brazosensis	Comb nov		(Ball) LaMotte	Eocene	Fayette Formation	USA; Texas		An Ocotea species Moved from Oreodaphne brazosensis (1924)	
Ocotea caudata	Comb nov		(Berry) LaMotte	Eocene	Mount Selman Formation	USA; Texas		An Ocotea species Moved from Mespilodaphne caudata (1924); Includes one subspecies moved from M. c. major	
Ocotea collazoensis	Comb nov		(Hollick) LaMotte	Miocene	Collazo Shales	USA; Puerto Rico		An Ocotea species Moved from Aniba collazoensis (1928)	
Ocotea coloradensis	Comb nov		(Brown) LaMotte	Eocene	Green River Formation	USA; Colorado		An Ocotea species Moved from Oreodaphne coloradensis (1934)	
Ocotea columbiana	Comb nov		(Hollick) LaMotte	Eocene	Lisbon Formation	USA; Mississippi		An Ocotea species Moved from Mespilodaphne columbiana (1924)	
Ocotea coushatta	Comb nov		(Berry) LaMotte	Eocene	Wilcox Formation	USA; Louisiana	Tetrantkera praecursoria (of Hollick, 1899)	An Ocotea species Moved from Oreodaphne coushatta (1916)	
Ocotea culebrensis	Comb nov		(Berry) LaMotte	Oligocene	Culebra Formation	Panama		An Ocotea species Moved from Mespilodaphne columbiana (1924)	
Ocotea eolignitica	Comb nov		(Hollick) LaMotte	Eocene		USA; Louisiana		An Ocotea species Moved from Mespilodaphne eolignitica (1916); First named Andromeda eolignitica (1899)	
Ocotea hispanioiana	Comb nov		(Berry) LaMotte	Miocene	Arbitonite Group	Haiti		An Ocotea species Moved from Mespilodaphne hispanioiana (1922)	
Ocotea inequilateralis	Comb nov		(Berry) LaMotte	Eocene	Gosport Formation	USA; Alabama		An Ocotea species Moved from Mespilodaphne inequilateralis (1924)	
Ocotea intermedia	Comb nov		(Berry) LaMotte	Eocene	Holly Springs Formation	USA; Tennessee		An Ocotea species Moved from Mespilodaphne intermedia (1930)	
Ocotea lancifolia	Comb nov		(Lesquereux) LaMotte	Eocene; Ypresian	Holly Springs Formation	USA; Tennessee	Oreodaphne knowltoni (1929)	An Ocotea species Moved from Oreodaphne lancifolia (1934); First described as Sapindus lancifolius (1883)	
Ocotea lithaeformis	Comb nov		(Lesquereux) LaMotte			USA; California	Oreodaphne heerii (1888)	An Ocotea species Moved from Mespilodaphne lithaeformis (1888)	
Ocotea mississippiensis	Comb nov		(Berry) LaMotte	Eocene	Holly Springs Formation	USA; Mississippi	Laurus primigenia (of Hollick)	An Ocotea species Moved from Mespilodaphne lithaeformis (1916)	
Ocotea obtusifolia	Comb nov		(Berry) LaMotte	Eocene	Holly Springs Formation	USA; Mississippi	Cinnamomum sezannense (of Hollick 1899)	An Ocotea species Moved from Oreodaphne obtusifolia (1916)	
Ocotea pagosensis	Comb nov		(Hollick) LaMotte	Paleocene	Animas Formation	USA; Colorado		An Ocotea species Moved from Oreodaphne pagosensis (1924)	
Ocotea palomarensis	Comb nov		(Berry) LaMotte	Miocene		Mexico; Oaxaca		An Ocotea species Moved from Mespilodaphne obtusifolia (1923)	
Ocotea perseaformis	Comb nov		(Ball) LaMotte	Eocene	Indio Formation	USA; Texas		An Ocotea species Moved from Oreodaphne perseaformis (1939)	
Ocotea praefracta	Comb nov		(Ball) LaMotte	Eocene	Wilcox Formation	USA; Texas		An Ocotea species Moved from Oreodaphne praefracta (1939)	
Ocotea precoushatta	Comb nov		(Berry) LaMotte	Eocene	Indio Formation	USA; Texas		An Ocotea species Moved from Mespilodaphne perseaformis (1924)	
Ocotea pseudoglauca	Comb nov		(Berry) LaMotte	Eocene	Wilcox Formation	USA; Louisiana	synonymy: Laurus californica pro part (1888); Laurus socialis pro part (1888)	An Ocotea species Moved from Mespilodaphne pseudoglauca (1916)	
Ocotea pseudoguianensis	Comb nov		(Berry) LaMotte	Eocene	Wilcox Formation	USA; Louisiana		An Ocotea species Moved from Mespilodaphne pseudoguianensis (1916)	
Ocotea puryearensis	Comb nov		(Berry) LaMotte	Eocene	Ackerman Formation	USA; Mississippi		An Ocotea species Moved from Oreodaphne pseudoguianensis (1916)	
Ocotea (?) ratonensis	Comb nov		(Hollick) LaMotte	Paleocene	Raton Formation	USA; Colorado		An Ocotea species Moved from Oreodaphne (?) ratonensis (1917)	
Ocotea ripariafolia	Comb nov		(Berry) LaMotte	Miocene	Forest Clay Formation	Trinidad and Tobago; Trinidad		An Ocotea species Moved from Aniba ripariafolia (1937)	
Ocotea salinensis	Comb nov		(Berry) LaMotte	Eocene	Wilcox Formation	USA; Arkansas		An Ocotea species Moved from Oreodaphne salinensis (1916)	
Ocotea tertiaria	Comb nov		(Berry) LaMotte			Costa Rica		An Ocotea species Moved from Goeppertia tertiaria (1921)	
Ocotea texana (Berry)	Comb nov	Homonym	(Berry) LaMotte	Eocene	Fayette Formation	USA; Texas		An Ocotea species Moved from Mespilodaphne texana (1924); Homonym with Ocotea texana (Ball)	
Ocotea texana (Ball)	Comb nov	Homonym	(Ball) LaMotte	Eocene	Indio Formation	USA; Texas		An Ocotea species Moved from Oreodaphne texana (1931); Homonym with Ocotea texana (Berry)	
Ocotea viridiflumensis	Comb nov		(Knowlton) LaMotte	Eocene	Green River Formation	USA; Colorado		An Ocotea species Moved from Oreodaphne coloradensis (1923)	
Ocotea wilcoxensis	Comb nov		(Berry) LaMotte	Eocene	Wilcox Formation	USA; Tennessee		An Ocotea species Moved from Oreodaphne wilcoxensis (1916)	
Sassafras quilchenensis	Sp nom nov		LaMotte	Eocene; Ypresian	Eocene Okanagan Highlands; Coldwater Beds	Canada; British Columbia		A Sassafras species A new name for Sassafras cretaceum (Penhallow) (1906)	
Umbellularia saliciformis	Comb nov		(Knowlton & Cockerell) LaMotte	Miocene	Neroly Formation	USA; California	synonymy: Laurus similis (of Berry 1929); Leguminosites bonseri (1929); Quercus simulata (of Berry 1929); Umbellularia dayana (1937); Umbellularia oregonensis (1930); Umbellularia salicifolia (1939)	A California bay species Moved from Laurus saliciformis (1919); First named Laurus salicifolia (Lesquereux) (1883); L. salicifolia a jr homonym of Laurus salicifolia (Banks & Solander)	

=== Monocots ===
Name	Novelty	Status	Authors	Age	Unit	Location	Synonymized taxa	Notes	Images
Cyperacites islandicus	Comb nov		(Heer) LaMotte	Paleocene		Iceland		A Cyperacites morphospecies Moved from Cyperites islandicus (1868)	
Exflabellaria	Gen et 4 comb nov	Jr synonym	LaMotte					A palm leaf morphogenus Replacement genus for the homonym Flabellaria (Sternberg) (1822); Jr synonym of Palmacites; Contained Flabellaria alaskana, F. groenlandica, F. johnstrupi, & F. latania	
Potamogeton orbus	Sp nom nov		LaMotte	Miocene	Latah Formation	USA; Washington		A possible pond weed species New name for referred "Potamogeton heterophylloides" fossils P. heterophylloides type specimens moved to Keteleeria heterophylloides (1940)	

=== Basal eudicots ===
Name	Novelty	Status	Authors	Age	Unit	Location	Synonymized taxa	Notes	Images
Nelumbium crossii	Comb nov		(Knowlton) LaMotte	Paleocene	Arapahoe Formation	USA; Colorado		A lotus relative. Moved from Nelumbo crossii (1930)	
Nelumbium protolutea	Comb nov		(Berry) LaMotte	Eocene	Wilcox Formation	USA; Mississippi	Nelumbo tenuifolia (of Berry, 1935)	A lotus relative. Moved from (1949); Nelumbites protoluteus First named Nelumbo protolutea (1917)	

=== Core Eudicots ===
==== Superasterids ====
Name	Novelty	Status	Authors	Age	Unit	Location	Synonymized taxa	Notes	Images
Achras agnitionalis	Comb nov		(Hollick) LaMotte	Miocene	Collazo Shale	USA; Puerto Rico		A Manilkara species. Moved from Sapota agnitionalis (1928)	
Arbutus xalapoldes	Sp nom nov		LaMotte	Pliocene		USA; California		A madrone. New name for "Arbutus prexalapensis" (1950) madrone fossils Type material of A. prexalapensis moved to other species	
Ardisia prepaniculata	Comb nov		(Berry) LaMotte	Eocene	Wilcox Formation	USA; Tennessee		A marlberry species. Moved from Icacorea prepaniculata (1916)	
Ardisia prisca	Comb nov		(Hollick) LaMotte	Miocene	Collazo Shale	USA; Puerto Rico		A marlberry species. Moved from Icacorea prisca (1924)	
Asclepias fructifer	Comb nov		(Cockerell) LaMotte	Eocene; Priabonian	Florissant Formation	USA; Colorado		A milkweed species. Moved from Acerates fructifer (1908)	
Asclepias veterana	Comb nov		(Heer) LaMotte	Miocene		Switzerland		A milkweed species. Moved from Acerates veterana (1859)	
Asclepias wilcoxiana	Comb nov		(Berry) LaMotte	Eocene	Wilcox Formation	USA; Tennessee		A milkweed species. Moved from Acerates wilcoxiana (1930)	
Coccoloba chapini	Comb nov		(Hollick) LaMotte	Paleocene/Eocene	Matanuska coal field	USA; Alaska		A Coccoloba species. Moved from Coccolobis chapini (1936)	
Coccoloba claibornensis	Comb nov		(Berry) LaMotte	Eocene	Gosport Formation	USA; Alabama		A Coccoloba species. Moved from Coccolobis claibornensis (1924)	
Coccoloba columbianus	Comb nov		(Berry) LaMotte	Eocene	Yegua Formation	USA; Louisiana		A Coccoloba species. Moved from Coccolobis columbianus (1924)	
Coccoloba eolignitica	Comb nov		(Berry) LaMotte	Eocene	Lagrange Formation	USA; Tennessee		A Coccoloba species. Moved from Coccolobis columbianus (1916)	
Coccoloba uviferafolia	Comb nov		(Berry) LaMotte	Eocene	Lagrange Formation	USA; Tennessee		A Coccoloba species. Moved from Coccolobis uviferafolia (1916)	
Cryptantha auriculata	Comb nov		(Elias) LaMotte	Pliocene	Ogallala Formation	USA; Kansas		A Cryptantha species. Moved from Krynitikia auriculata (1932)	
Cryptantha chaneyi	Comb nov		(Elias) LaMotte	Pliocene	Ogallala Formation	USA; Kansas		A Cryptantha species. Moved from Krynitzkia (Oreocarya) chaneyi (1932)	
Cryptantha coroniformis	Comb nov		(Elias) LaMotte	Pliocene	Ogallala Formation	USA; Kansas		A Cryptantha species. Moved from Krynitzkia (Oreocarya) coroniformis (1932)	
Gonolobus (?) trinervatus	Comb nov		(MacGinitie) LaMotte	Miocene	Trout Creek Flora	USA; Oregon		An asclepiadoid milkweed family species Moved from Vincetoxicum (?) trinervata (1933)	
Halesia inopinum	Comb nov		(Hollick) LaMotte	Paleocene	Berg lake Formation	USA; Alaska		A snowdrop tree species Moved from Mohrodendron inopinum (1936)	
Leiophyllum pleistocenicum	Comb nov		(Berry) LaMotte	Pleistocene		USA; North Carolina		A sandmyrtle species First described as Dendrium pleistocenicum (1907)	
Viburnum comstocki	Comb nov		(Sanborn) LaMotte	Eocene		USA; Oregon	synonymy: Aralia taurinensis (pro part of Sanborn 1935); Diospyros orientalis (1935); Viburnum variabilis (1941)	A Viburnum species First described as Mallotus comstocki (1935)	

==== Superrosids ====
Name	Novelty	Status	Authors	Age	Unit	Location	Synonymized taxa	Notes	Images
Acer (Negundo) decurrens	Comb nov		(Lesquereux) LaMotte	Paleocene	Denver Formation	USA; Colorado		A maple. Moved from Negundo decurrens (1888)	
Acer (Negundo) fremontensis	Comb nov		(Berry) LaMotte	Eocene	Bridger Formation	USA; Wyoming		A maple. Moved from Negundo fremontensis (1930)	
Acer negundifolium	Comb nov		(Dawson) LaMotte	Eocene (Ypresian)	Eocene Okanagan Highlands; Stump lake	Canada; British Columbia		A possible maple. Moved from Acerites negundifolium (1891)	
Acer orbum	Sp nom nov		LaMotte	Eocene	Ione Formation	USA; California		A maple. New name for Acer aequidentatum maple fossils A. aequidentatum type fossils moved to Platanus appendiculata	
Acer (Negundo) triloba	Comb nov		(Newberry) LaMotte	Paleocene	Fort Union Formation	USA; North Dakota		A maple. Moved from Negundo triloba (1868)	
Acer tuckeri	Comb nov		(Smith) LaMotte	Pliocene	"Hog Creek"	USA; Idaho		A maple. Moved from Engdhardtia tuckeri (1938)	
Canarium leonis	Comb nov		(Cockerell) LaMotte	Eocene	Ione Formation	USA; California	synonymy: Juglans californica (1878); Canarium californicum (1941)	A Canarium species. Moved from Juglans leonis (1908)	
Carya bartoni	Comb nov		(Ball) LaMotte	Eocene		USA; Texas		A hicory species. Moved from Hicoria bartoni (1931)	
Carya biacuminata	Comb nov		(Perkins) LaMotte	Eocene	Brandon lignites	USA; Vermont		A hicory species. Moved from Hicoria biacuminata (1904)	
Carya crescentia	Comb nov		(Knowlton) LaMotte	Paleocene		USA; Wyoming		A hickory species. Moved from Hicoria crescentia (1899)	
Carya culveri	Comb nov		(Knowlton) LaMotte	Paleocene		USA; Wyoming		A hickory species. Moved from Hicoria culveri (1899)	
Carya dawsoni	Comb nov	valid	(Berry) LaMotte	Early Eocene (Ypresian)	Okanagan Highlands; Chu Chua Formation	Canada; British Columbia		A hickory. Moved from Hicoria dawsoni (1962)	
Carya dentata	Comb nov		(Knowlton) LaMotte	Paleocene		USA; Wyoming		A hickory species. Moved from Hicoria culveri (1899)	
Carya jacksoniana	Comb nov		(Berry) LaMotte	Eocene	Yegua Formation	USA; Texas	synonymy: Carya olivaeformis (1859); Hicoria pecan (1915)	A hickory species. Moved from Hicoria jacksoniana (1924)	
Carya juxtaporipites	Comb nov		(Berry) LaMotte	Eocene; Ypresian	Green River Formation	USA; Colorado		A hickory species. Moved from Hicoria juxtaporipites (1933)	
Carya (?) oregoniana	Comb nov		(Knowlton) LaMotte	Eocene	Clarno Formation	USA; Oregon		A hickory species. Moved from Hicoria (?) oregoniana (1902)	
Carya orientalis	Comb nov		(Chaney) LaMotte	Oligocene	Eagle Creek flora	USA; Oregon		A hickory species. Moved from Hicoria orientalis (1920)	
Carya pretexana	Comb nov		(Berry) LaMotte	Pliocene	Citronelle Formation	USA; Alabama		A hickory species. Moved from Hicoria pretexana (1916)	
Carya princetoniana	Comb nov		(Cockerell) LaMotte	Eocene; Priabonian	Florissant Formation	USA; Colorado		A hickory species. Moved from Hicoria princetoniana (1908)	
Carya rostrataformis	Comb nov		(Berry) LaMotte	Eocene	Lagrange Formation	USA; Tennessee		A hickory species. Moved from Hicoria rostrataformis (1924)	
Carya stanleyanum	Comb nov	valid	(Dawson) LaMotte	Early Eocene (Ypresian)	Huntingdon Formation	Canada; British Columbia		A hickory. Moved from Hicoria dawsoni (1962); First named Dryophyllum stanleyanum (1895)	
Carya williamsi	Comb nov		(Chaney) LaMotte	Oligocene	Eagle Creek flora	USA; Oregon		A hickory species. Moved from Hicoria williamsi (1920)	
Celtis americana	Comb nov		(Berry) LaMotte	Eocene	McBean Formation	USA; Georgia	Mimosa americana (1919)	A Celtis species. Moved from Momisia americana (1914)	
Cercidiphyllum piperoides	Comb nov		(Lesquereux) LaMotte	Eocene	Ione Formation	USA; California	synonymy: Ceanothus idahoensis (1935); Cercidiphyllum elongatum (1939); Populus smilacifolia (1920); Populus zaddachi (1878); Trochodendroides zaddacki (1935); Zizyphus californica (1919); Zizyphus microphyllus (Lesquereux) (1878)	A katsura species. Moved from Zizyphus piperoides (1878); Moved to Tetracentron piperoides in 1977	Tetracentron piperoides
Comptonia parvula	Comb nov		(Heer) LaMotte	Cretaceous	Patoot beds	Denmark; Greenland	synonymy: Myrica (Comptonia) parvifolia (1883); Comptonia microphylla (1906)	A Comptonia species. Moved from Myrica (Comptonia) parvula (1916)	
Cupanites berryi	Sp nom nov		LaMotte	Eocene	Barnwell Formation	USA; Georgia		A sapindaceous Cupanites species. A new name for Cupanites nigricans (1918)	
Inga alia	Sp nom nov		LaMotte	Miocene		Cuba		An ice-cream-bean species A new species name for Inga miocenica (Berry, 1939) (1939)	
Liquidambar dubia	Sp nom nov		(Berry) LaMotte	Eocene	Lagrange Formation	USA; Kentucky		A sweetgum species A replacement name for Liquidambar incerta (Berry, 1924) (1924)	
Macrolobium geminifolia	Comb nov		(MacGinitie) LaMotte	Eocene	Ione Formation	USA; California		A Macrolobium species legume. Moved from Vouapa geminifolia (1941)	
Melastomites incertus	Sp nom nov		LaMotte	Oligocene	Culebra Formation	Panama		A melastome species A replacement name for Melastomites miconioides (Berry, 1919) (1919)	
Populus americana	Comb nov		(Lesquereux) LaMotte	Eocene; Priabonian	Florissant Formation	USA; Colorado	synonymy: Populus heerii (of Lesquereux 1883); Populus lesquereuxi (1906)	A cottonwood species. Moved from Pterocarya americana (1874)	
Populus (?) paramonodon	Sp nom nov		LaMotte	Paleocene		USA; New Mexico		A possible cottonwood species New name for referred "Populus monodon" fossils P. monodon type specimens moved to Ficus monodon	
Prunus gracilis (Lesquereux)	Comb nov	Jr homonym	(Lesquereux) LaMotte	Eocene; Pribonian	Florissant Formation	USA; Colorado	Quercus neriifolia (of Lesquereux, 1883	A possible cherry species Moved from Amygdalus gracilis (1883); Jr homonym of Prunus gracilis (Engelm. & A.Gray)	
Prunus wilcoxiana	Comb nov		(Berry) LaMotte	Eocene	Tallahatta Formation; Holly Springs Sand Member	USA; Tennessee		A possible cherry species Moved from Amygdalus wilcoxiana (1930)	
Pyrus alvordensis	Comb nov		(MacGinitie) LaMotte		Trout Creek flora	USA; Oregon		A possible mountain ash species Moved from Sorbus alvordensis (1933)	
Pyrus coronariafolia	Comb nov		(Berry) LaMotte	Pleistocene		USA; North Carolina		A possible apple species Moved from Malus coronariafolia (1907)	
Pyrus decorafolia	Comb nov		(Berry) LaMotte	Eocene (Ypresian)	Okanagan Highlands; Chu Chua Formation	Canada; British Columbia		A possible mountain ash species Moved from Sorbus decorafolia (1926)	
Pyrus diversifolia (Lesquereux)	Comb nov	Jr homonym	(Lesquereux) LaMotte	Eocene (Priabonian)	Florissant Formation	USA; Colorado	synonymy: Crataegus acerifolia (Lesquereux) (1883); Crataegus lesquereuxi (1906); Onoclea reducta (1908)	A possible mountain ash species Moved from Sorbus diversifolia (1918); First named Myrica diversifolia (1883) homonym of Pyrus diversifolia Bong.	
Pyrus grandifolia	Comb nov		(Heer) LaMotte	Paleocene		Denmark; Greenland		A possible mountain ash species Moved from Sorbus grandifolia (1869)	
Pyrus harneyensis	Comb nov		(Axelrod) LaMotte	Pliocene		USA; Oregon		A possible mountain ash species Moved from Sorbus harneyensis (1944)	
Pyrus idahoensis	Comb nov		(Brown) LaMotte	Oligocene	Salmon flora	USA; Idaho		A possible apple species Moved from Malus idahoensis (1935)	
Pyrus megaphylla	Comb nov		(Cockerell) LaMotte	Eocene; Priabonian	Florissant Formation	USA; Colorado		A possible mountain ash species Moved from Sorbus megaphylla (1908)	
Pyrus nupta	Comb nov		(Cockerell) LaMotte	Eocene; Priabonian	Florissant Formation	USA; Colorado	Myrica diversifolia (1883) pro part	A possible mountain ash species Moved from Sorbus nupta (1910)	
Pyrus pseudoangustifolla	Comb nov		(Berry) LaMotte	Pleistocene		USA; North Carolina		A possible apple species Moved from Malus pseudoangustifolla (1910)	
Shepherdia weaveri	Comb nov		(Hollick) LaMotte	Paleocene - Eocene	"Kachemak Bay flora"	USA; Alaska		A possible buffaloberry species Moved from Lepargyraea weaveri (1936)	
Sphaeralcea (?) exhumatum	Comb nov		(Cockerell) LaMotte	Eocene; Priabonian	Florissant Formation	USA; Colorado		A possible globemallow species Moved from Malvastrum (?) exhumatum (1906)	
Ulmus chuchuanus	Sp nom nov	valid	(Berry) LaMotte	Eocene (Ypresian)	Okanagan Highlands; Chu Chua Formation	Canada; British Columbia		An elm. New name for "Ulmus columbianus" Berry (1926); Junior homonym of "Ulmus columbiana" Penhallow (1907)	Ulmus chuchuanus
Xanthoxylum alia	Sp nom nov		LaMotte	Miocene		Cuba		A possible Zanthoxylum species New name for Fagara miocenica Berry, 1939) (1939); F. miocenica a jr homonym of Fagara miocenica (Berry, 1925)	
Xanthoxylum apalachacolensis	Comb nov		(Berry) LaMotte	Miocene	Alum Bluff Formation	USA; Florida		A possible Zanthoxylum species Moved from Fagara apalachacolensis (1916)	
Xanthoxylum catahoulensis	Comb nov		(Berry) LaMotte	Eocene	Catahoula Formation	USA; Louisiana		A possible Zanthoxylum species Moved from Fagara catahoulensis (1916); 4 varieties also moved F. c. corlacea, F. c. elongata, F. c. major, & F. c. orbiculata	
Xanthoxyium claibornensis	Comb nov		(Berry) LaMotte	Eocene	Mount Selman Formation	USA; Texas		A possible Zanthoxylum species Moved from Fagara claibornensis (1924)	
Xanthoxyium (?) delicatula	Comb nov		(Cockerell) LaMotte	Eocene; Priabonian	Florissant Formation	USA; Colorado		A possible Zanthoxylum species Moved from Fagara (?) delicatula (1908)	
Xanthoxylum dubium	Comb nov	nomen nudum	(Lesquereux) LaMotte	Paleocene	Raton Formation	USA; New Mexico		A possible Zanthoxylum species Moved from Zanthoxylum dubium (1872); Considered nomen nudum by LaMotte	
Xanthoxylum eocenica	Comb nov		(Berry) LaMotte	Eocene	Lagrange Formation	USA; Tennessee		A possible Zanthoxylum species Moved from Fagara eocenica (1916)	
Xanthoxylum juglandianum	Comb nov		(Braun) LaMotte	"Tertiary"		Europe		A possible Zanthoxylum species Moved from Zanthoxylum juglandianum (1878)	
Xanthoxylum miocenica	Comb nov		(Berry) LaMotte	Miocene	Forest Sand Formation	Trinidad		A possible Zanthoxylum species Moved from Fagara miocenica (1925)	
Xanthroxylum petraflumensis	Comb nov		(Berry) LaMotte	Eocene	Yegua Formation	USA; Texas		A possible Zanthoxylum species Moved from Fagara petraflumensis (1924)	
Xanthoxylum puryearensis	Comb nov		(Berry) LaMotte	Eocene	Lagrange Formation	USA; Tennessee		A possible Zanthoxylum species Moved from Fagara eocenica (1916)	
Xanthoxyium spireaefolia	Comb nov		(Lesquereux) LaMotte	Eocene; Priabonian	Florissant Formation	USA; Colorado		A possible Zanthoxylum species Moved from Fagara spireaefolia (1908); First named Zanthoxylum spireaefolium (1883)	
Xanthoxylum wadii	Comb nov		(Berry) LaMotte	Miocene		Mexico; Oaxaca		A possible Zanthoxylum species Moved from Fagara wadii (1923)	
Xanthoxylum wyomingensis	Comb nov		(Berry) LaMotte	Eocene	Bridger Formation	USA; Wyoming		A possible Zanthoxylum species Moved from Fagara wyomingensis (1930)	

=== Other angiosperms ===
Name	Novelty	Status	Authors	Age	Unit	Location	Synonymized taxa	Notes	Images
Carpites interglacialis	Comb nov		(Hollick) LaMotte	Miocene	St. Eugene Silts	Canada; British Columbia	synonymy: Carpites menthoides (1926); Carpolithes sp. (1937); Equisetum sp. (underground stem) (1926); Malva (?) hesperia (1928); Phyllites amplexicaulis (1926)	A fruit/seed species of uncertain affinity. Moved from Ficus interglacalis (1928)	

== General research ==
- Robert LaMotte publishes the Catalogue of the Cenozoic plants of North America through 1950, with numerous nomenclatural updates and corrections.
