= 1944 in paleontology =

Paleontology or palaeontology is the study of prehistoric life forms on Earth through the examination of plant and animal fossils. This includes the study of body fossils, tracks (ichnites), burrows, cast-off parts, fossilised feces (coprolites), palynomorphs and chemical residues. Because humans have encountered fossils for millennia, paleontology has a long history both before and after becoming formalized as a science. This article records significant discoveries and events related to paleontology that occurred or were published in the year 1944.

== Plants ==
Name	Novelty	Status	Authors	Age	Type locality	Location	Synonymized taxa	Notes	Images
Amelanchier couleeana	Comb nov	valid	(E.W. Berry, 1931)	Miocene; Langhian	Latah Formation	USA; Washington	Amelanchier dignata of Smith, 1941; Amelanchier dignatus of Brown, 1935 p. p.; Amelanchier elliptica of Smith, 1941; Amelanchier grayi of MacGinitie, 1933; Amelanchier magnifolia 1937; Amelanchier scudderi of Berry, 1929; Amelanchier subserrata of Smith, 1941; Phyllites couleeanus 1931	A saskatoon berry species. Moved from Phyllites couleeanus (1931)	
Betula taylorana	Comb nov	valid	R.W. Brown	Eocene	Ackerman Formation	USA; Tennessee		A birch species.	
Cladrastis oregonensis	Comb nov	valid	(E.W. Berry & T.D.A. Cockerell, 1919)	Eocene	Clarno Formation	USA; Oregon		A yellowwood species. First named as Fraxinus oregonensis (1919); Moved from Umbellularia oregonensis (1925).	
Cornus republicensis	Nom nov	jr synonym	LaMotte	Eocene; Ypresian	Eocene Okanagan Highlands; Klondike Mountain Formation; Tom Thumb Tuff	USA; Washington		A replacement name for Cornus acuminata Berry, 1929; Moved to Schoepfia republicensis in 1987	Schoepfia republicensis
Koelreuteria mixta	Comb nov	valid (pro parte)	(Lesquereux, 1878)	Eocene, Ypresian	Ione Formation	USA; California		A golden rain tree species Moved from Rhus mixta (1878); Species definition expanded to include fruits Fruits moved to Koelreuteria dilcheri in 2013.	

== Arthropods ==
=== Newly named crustaceans ===
Name	Novelty	Status	Authors	Age	Type locality	Location	Notes	Images
Palaeophoberus portlandicus	Sp nov	Valid	Roger & Lapparent	Late Jurassic (Tithonian)	Hannaches	France	A stenochirid	

== Conodonts ==
Name	Status	Authors	Location	Images
Siphonodella	valid	Edward Branson; Maurice Mehl	Austria; China; Germany; Russia; USA (Virginia)	

== Dinosaurs ==
- The only known fossils of Poekilopleuron are destroyed during the Allied liberation of Normandy.

=== Newly named dinosaurs ===
Data are courtesy of George Olshevky's dinosaur genera list.

Name	Status	Authors	Location	Notes	Images
Sanpasaurus	Nomen dubium.	Yang Z. J. (as Young C. C.)	China	It has been argued that the remains were ornithopods or sauropods. They are now the remains of a sauropod.	

== Plesiosaurs ==
=== New taxa ===
Name	Status	Authors	Location	Notes
Sinopliosaurus	Valid	Young	China	
