= 1878 in paleontology =

Paleontology or palaeontology is the study of prehistoric life forms on Earth through the examination of plant and animal fossils. This includes the study of body fossils, tracks (ichnites), burrows, cast-off parts, fossilised feces (coprolites), palynomorphs and chemical residues. Because humans have encountered fossils for millennia, paleontology has a long history both before and after becoming formalized as a science. This article records significant discoveries and events related to paleontology that occurred or were published in the year 1878.

== Plants ==
=== Angiosperms ===
Name	Novelty	Status	Authors	Age	Unit	Location	Synonymized taxa	Notes	Images
Acer aequidentatum	sp nov	valid	Lesquereux	Eocene; Ypresian	Ione Formation	US; California		A maple species.	
Acer bolanderi	sp nov	valid	Lesquereux	Eocene; Ypresian	Ione Formation	US; California		A maple species.	
Aralia angustiloba	sp nov	jr synonym	Lesquereux	Eocene; Ypresian	Ione Formation	US; California		First described as a spikenard species. Moved to Platanophyllum angustiloba in 1941. Moved to Macginitiea angustiloba in 1986.	
Aralia whitneyi	sp nov	jr synonym	Lesquereux	Eocene; Ypresian	Ione Formation	US; California		First described as a spikenard species. Moved to Platanophyllum whitneyi in 1941. Moved to Macginitiea whitneyi in 1986.	
Betula aequalis	sp nov	jr synonym	Lesquereux	Eocene; Ypresian	Ione Formation	US; California		First described as a birch relative. Moved to Acalypha aequalis in 1941.	
Castanopsis chrysophylloides	sp nov	jr synonym	Lesquereux	Eocene; Ypresian	Ione Formation	US; California		First described as an chinquapin species. Moved to Tabernaemontana chrysophylloides in 1941.	
Cercocarpus antiquus	sp nov	valid	Lesquereux	Eocene; Ypresian	Ione Formation	US; California		A mountain mahogany species.	
Cornus kelloggii	sp nov	valid	Lesquereux	Eocene; Ypresian	Ione Formation	US; California		A dogwood species.	
Cornus ovalis	sp nov	valid	Lesquereux	Eocene; Ypresian	Ione Formation	US; California		A dogwood species.	
Fagus pseudoferruginea	sp nov	valid	Lesquereux	Eocene; Ypresian	Ione Formation	US; California		A beech tree species.	
Ficus microphylla	sp nov	jr homonym	Lesquereux	Eocene; Ypresian	Ione Formation	US; California		A fig species. A jr homonym of Ficus microphylla Salzm. ex Miq., 1853; Moved to replacement name Ficus mensae in 1910.	
Ficus sordida	sp nov	jr synonym	Lesquereux	Eocene; Ypresian	Ione Formation	US; California		First described as a fig species. Moved to Phytocrene sordida in 1941.	
Ilex prunifolia	sp nov	valid	Lesquereux	Eocene; Ypresian	Ione Formation	US; California		A holly species.	
Juglans californica	sp nov	jr synonym	Lesquereux	Eocene; Ypresian	Ione Formation	US; California		First described as a walnut species. A jr homonym of Juglans californica S. Watson, 1875; Moved to Juglans leonis in 1908. Moved to Canarium leonis in 1952.	
Juglans egregia	sp nov	jr synonym	Lesquereux	Eocene; Ypresian	Ione Formation	US; California		First described as a walnut species. Moved to Carya egregia in 1936. Moved to Gordonia egregia in 1941.	
Juglans laurinea	sp nov	jr synonym	Lesquereux	Eocene; Ypresian	Ione Formation	US; California		First described as a walnut species. Moved to Phyllites laurineus in 1941. Moved to Sageretia laurinea in 1977.	
Juglans oregoniana	sp nov	valid	Lesquereux	Eocene?	Mascall Formation	US; Oregon		A walnut species.	
Liquidambar californica	sp nov	valid	Lesquereux	Eocene; Ypresian	Ione Formation	US; California		A sweet gum species.	
Magnolia californica	sp nov	valid	Lesquereux	Eocene; Ypresian	Ione Formation	US; California		A Magnolia species.	
Magnolia lanceolata	sp nov	jr homonym	Lesquereux	Eocene; Ypresian	Ione Formation	US; California		A Magnolia species. A jr homonym of Magnolia lanceolata Link, 1829; Moved to replacement name Magnolia dayana in 1910.	
Persea pseudocarolinensis	sp nov	valid	Lesquereux	Eocene; Ypresian	Ione Formation	US; California		An avacado species.	
Platanus appendiculata	sp nov	valid	Lesquereux	Eocene; Ypresian	Ione Formation	US; California		A sycamore species.	
Platanus dissecta	sp nov	valid	Lesquereux	Eocene; Ypresian	Ione Formation	US; California		A sycamore species.	
Quercus boweniana	sp nov	valid	Lesquereux	Eocene; Ypresian	Ione Formation	US; California		An oak species.	
Quercus convexa	sp nov	jr synonym	Lesquereux	Eocene; Ypresian	Ione Formation	US; California		First described as an oak species. Moved to Castanopsis convexa in 1935. Moved to Chrysolepis convexa in 1985.	
Quercus distincta	sp nov	valid	Lesquereux	Eocene; Ypresian	Ione Formation	US; California		An oak species.	
Quercus elaenoides	sp nov	jr synonym	Lesquereux	Eocene; Ypresian	Ione Formation	US; California		First described as an oak species. Moved to Nyssa elaenoides in 1944.	
Quercus goeppertii	sp nov	jr homonym	Lesquereux	Eocene; Ypresian	Ione Formation	US; California		First described as an oak species. A jr homonym of Quercus goeppertii O. Weber, 1852; Moved to replacement name Alnus operia in 1941.	
Quercus nevadensis	sp nov	valid	Lesquereux	Eocene; Ypresian	Ione Formation	US; California		An oak species.	
Quercus pseudochrysophylla	sp nov	valid	Lesquereux	Eocene; Ypresian	Ione Formation	US; California		An oak species.	
Quercus pseudolyrata	sp nov	valid	Lesquereux	Eocene; Ypresian	Ione Formation	US; California		An oak species.	
Quercus transgressus	sp nov	valid	Lesquereux	Eocene; Ypresian	Ione Formation	US; California		An oak species.	
Quercus voyana	sp nov	jr synonym	Lesquereux	Eocene; Ypresian	Ione Formation	US; California		First described as an oak species. Moved to Hamamelites voyana in 1941.	
Rhus boweniana	sp nov	valid	Lesquereux	Eocene; Ypresian	Ione Formation	US; California		A sumac relative.	
Rhus dispersa	sp nov	jr synonym	Lesquereux	Eocene; Ypresian	Ione Formation	US; California		First described as a sumac species. Moved to Quercus dispersa in 1939.	
Rhus metopioides	sp nov	jr homonym	Lesquereux	Eocene; Ypresian	Ione Formation	US; California		A sumac relative. A jr homonym of Rhus metopioides Turcz., 1858; Moved to replacement name Rhus mensae in 1941.	
Rhus mixta	sp nov	jr synonym	Lesquereux	Eocene; Ypresian	Ione Formation	US; California		First described as a sumac species. Moved to Koelreuteria mixta in 1946.	
Rhus myricaefolia	sp nov	jr synonym	Lesquereux	Eocene; Ypresian	Ione Formation	US; California		First described as a sumac species. Moved to Thouinopsis myricaefolia in 1941.	
Rhus typhinoides	sp nov	jr synonym	Lesquereux	Eocene; Ypresian	Ione Formation	US; California		First described as a sumac species. Moved to Carya typhinoides in 1944.	
Sabalites californicus	sp nov	valid	Lesquereux	Eocene; Ypresian	Ione Formation	US; California		A palm relative.	
Salix californica	sp nov	valid	Lesquereux	Eocene; Ypresian	Ione Formation	US; California		A willow species.	
Salix elliptica	sp nov	jr homonym	Lesquereux	Eocene; Ypresian	Ione Formation	US; California		First described as a willow species. A jr homonym of Salix elliptica Schleich. ex Ser., 1815; Moved to replacement name Salix merriamii in 1908.	
Ulmus affinis	sp nov	jr homonym	Lesquereux	Eocene; Ypresian	Ione Formation	US; California		An elm species. A jr homonym of Ulmus affinis Massal., 1853	
Ulmus californica	sp nov	valid	Lesquereux	Eocene; Ypresian	Ione Formation	US; California		An elm species.	
Ulmus pseudofulva	sp nov	jr synonym	Lesquereux	Eocene; Ypresian	Ione Formation	US; California		First described as an elm species. Moved to Chaetoptelea pseudofulva in 1941.	
Zanthoxylum diversifolium	sp nov	jr synonym	Lesquereux	Eocene; Ypresian	Ione Formation	US; California		First described as a Sichuan pepper species. Moved to Fagara diversifolia in 1908.	
Zizyphus microphyllus	sp nov	jr synonym	Lesquereux	Eocene; Ypresian	Ione Formation	US; California		A jujube species. A jr homonym of Zizyphus microphyllus Roxb., 1824; Synonymized into Cercidiphyllum piperoides in 1952.	
Ziziphus piperoides	sp nov	jr synonym	Lesquereux	Eocene; Ypresian	Ione Formation	US; California		First described as a jujube species. Moved to Cercidiphyllum piperoides in 1952. Moved to Tetracentron piperoides in 1977	Tetracentron piperoides

== Arthropods ==
=== Newly named arachnids ===
Name	Novelty	Status	Authors	Age	Unit	Location	Notes	Images
Aranea columbiae	Sp nov	jr synonym	Scudder	?Ypresian	Quesnel ?Fraser Formation	Canada; British Columbia	An orb-web spider egg sack ichnogenus. moved to Araneaovoius columbiae (2011).	Araneaovoius columbiae (1890 illustration

=== Newly named insects ===
Name	Novelty	Status	Authors	Age	Unit	Location	Notes	Images
Bothromicromus	Gen et Sp nov	valid	Scudder	?Ypresian	Quesnel ?Fraser Formation	Canada; British Columbia	A possibly megalomine hemerobiid lacewing. Type species B. lachlani	Bothromicromus lachlani (1890 illustration)
Euschistus antiquus	Sp nov	jr synonym	Scudder	?Ypresian	Quesnel ?Fraser Formation	Canada; British Columbia	A shield bug moved to Teleoschistus antiquus (1890).	Teleoschistus antiquus (1890 illustration)
Holcorpa	Gen et sp nov	valid	Scudder	Eocene; Priabonian	Florissant Formation	USA; Colorado	A holcorpid scorpionfly The type species is H. maculosa.	Holcorpa maculosa
Lachnus quesneli	Sp nov	jr synonym	Scudder	?Ypresian	Quesnel ?Fraser Formation	Canada; British Columbia	An aphidoid of uncertain placement Moved to Sbenaphis quesneli (1890).	Sbenaphis quesneli (1890 illustration)
Sciara deperdita	Sp nov	valid	Scudder	?Ypresian	Quesnel ?Fraser Formation	Canada; British Columbia	A sciarine dark-winged fungus gnat.	Sciara deperdita (1890 illustration)

== Archosauromorphs ==
O. W. Lucas recovers more material which would be referred to Laelaps trihedrodon from Morrison Formation strata near Garden Park, Colorado.

=== Newly named pseudosuchians ===
Name	Novelty	Status	Authors	Age	Unit	Location	Notes	Images
Symphyrophus		Nomen dubium	Cope	Late Jurassic (Kimmeridgian to Tithonian)	Morrison Formation	USA	Possible synonym of Amphicotylus.	

=== Newly named dinosaurs ===
Name	Novelty	Status	Authors	Age	Unit	Location	Notes	Images
Amphicoelias fragillimus	Sp nov	Jr. synonym	Marsh	Late Jurassic (Tithonian)	Unknown	USA	Moved to Maraapunisaurus fragillimus (2018).	Maraapunisaurus fragillimus
Brachyrophus	Gen nov	jr synonym	Cope	Late Jurassic (Kimmeridgian to Tithonian)	Morrison Formation	USA	Junior synonym of Camptosaurus.	Camptosaurus dispar
Creosaurus	Gen nov	Junior synonym	Marsh	Late Jurassic (Kimmeridgian to Tithonian)	Morrison Formation	USA	Synonym of Allosaurus fragilis.	Allosaurus fragilis
Diplodocus	Gen et sp nov	Valid	Marsh	Late Jurassic (Kimmeridgian to Tithonian)	Morrison Formation	USA	A diplodocine diplodocid. Type species D. longus	Diplodocus carnegii
Epanterias	Gen et sp nov	Nomen dubium	Cope	Late Jurassic (Kimmeridgian to Tithonian)	Morrison Formation	USA; Colorado	An allosaurid theropod. Possibly a synonym of Allosaurus. Type species E. amplexus	
Hypsirhophus	Gen et sp nov	Nomen dubium	Cope	Late Jurassic (Kimmeridgian to Tithonian)	Morrison Formation	USA; Colorado	possibly a synonym of Stegosaurus. Type species H. discurus	
Laosaurus	Gen et sp nov	Nomen dubium	Marsh	Late Jurassic (Kimmeridgian to Tithonian)	Morrison Formation	USA; Colorado	A dubious Neornithischian of uncertain placement.	Laosaurus
Morosaurus	Gen et sp nov	Jr. synonym	Marsh	Late Jurassic (Kimmeridgian to Tithonian)	Morrison Formation	USA; Colorado	Junior synonym of Camarasaurus. Type species M. grandis	Camarasaurus lentus

== Plesiosaurs ==
=== Newly named plesiosaurs ===
Name	Novelty	Status	Authors	Age	Unit	Location	Notes	Images
Eurysaurus	Gen et sp nov	Valid	Gaudry	Early Jurassic	Unknown	France	A possible pliosauroid Type species E. raincourti	

== Synapsids ==
=== Non-mammalian ===
Name	Status	Authors	Discovery year	Age	Unit	Location	Notes	Images
Dimetrodon	Valid						USA; Texas	Dimetrodon incisivum
Embolophorus	Valid							
Ophiacodon	Valid							
Sphenacodon	Valid							
Theropleura	Valid							
