= Paragonatodus =

Paragonatodus Temporal range: Tournaisian

Scientific classification
- Domain: Eukaryota
- Kingdom: Animalia
- Phylum: Chordata
- Class: Actinopterygii
- Order: †Palaeonisciformes
- Genus: †Paragonatodus; Kazantseva-Selezneva, 1980

Extinct genus of fishes

Paragonatodus is an extinct genus of prehistoric bony fish that lived during the Tournaisian stage of the Mississippian epoch.

== See also ==
- Prehistoric fish
- List of prehistoric bony fish
