= Paramesolepis =

Paramesolepis Temporal range: Tournaisian

Scientific classification
- Domain: Eukaryota
- Kingdom: Animalia
- Phylum: Chordata
- Class: Actinopterygii
- Order: †Palaeonisciformes
- Genus: †Paramesolepis; Moy-Thomas & Dyne, 1938

Extinct genus of ray-finned fishes

Paramesolepis is an extinct genus of ray-finned fish that lived during the Tournaisian stage of the Mississippian epoch.
