= Scaliognathus =

Scaliognathus Temporal range: Tournaisian

Scientific classification
- Kingdom: Animalia
- Phylum: Chordata
- Infraphylum: Agnatha
- Class: †Conodonta
- Order: †Ozarkodinida
- Genus: †Scaliognathus; Branson & Mehl, 1941

Species
- †Scaliognathus anchoralis

Extinct genus of jawless fishes

Scaliognathus is an extinct genus of conodonts.

The Tournaisian, the oldest age of the Mississippian contains eight conodont biozones, one of which is the zone of Gnathodus pseudosemiglaber and Scaliognathus anchoralis.
