= Richmond Group (geology) =

- Stratigraphic range: Ordovician
- Type: Group
- Sub-units: Big Hill Formation. Whitewater Formation

Location
- Region: Michigan
- Country: United States

The Richmond Group is a geologic group in Michigan. It preserves fossils dating back to the Ordovician period.

In 1951, E. B. Branson, Mehl and C.C. Branson published an article about the Richmond Group conodonts of Kentucky and Indiana.
