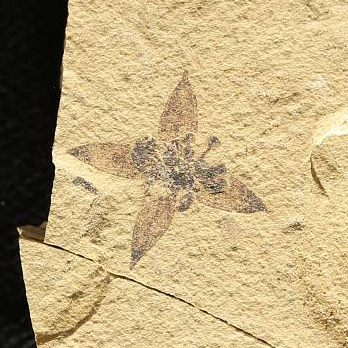
- flower, USNM P36857

Scientific classification
- Kingdom: Plantae
- Clade: Tracheophytes
- Clade: Angiosperms
- Clade: Eudicots
- Clade: Rosids
- Order: Malpighiales
- Family: Salicaceae
- Genus: †Pseudosalix; Boucher, Manchester, & Judd
- Species: †P. handleyi

Binomial name
- †Pseudosalix handleyi Boucher, Manchester, & Judd

Synonyms
- Antholithes polemonioides R.W. Brown, 1929; Antholithes sp. 6 R.W. Brown, 1934; Potentilla? byrami Cockerell, 1925

= Pseudosalix =

Pseudosalix Temporal range: Eocene

Extinct genus of flowering plant

Pseudosalix is an extinct genus of flowering plants placed in the family Salicaceae, a possible sister to the tribe Saliceae. The genus has one described species, Pseudosalix handleyi and is known from undescribed fossils as well.
