= Taphrognathus =

Taphrognathus Temporal range: Mississippian

Scientific classification
- Kingdom: Animalia
- Phylum: Chordata
- Infraphylum: Agnatha
- Class: †Conodonta
- Order: †Ozarkodinida
- Family: †Cavusgnathidae
- Genus: †Taphrognathus; Branson and Mehl, 1941

Species
- †Taphrognathus transatlanticus; †Taphrognathus varians

Extinct genus of jawless fishes

Taphrognathus is an extinct genus of conodonts from the Dinantian (Lower Carboniferous).

== Synonyms ==
In 1947 the name Taphrognathus was also used to describe a prehistoric amphibian from the Middle Triassic of Arizona, but the amphibian was renamed Hadrokkosaurus in 1957 after the synonymy was realized.
