= Tejon Formation =

Geologic formation in California, United States

- Stratigraphic range: Paleogene
- Type: Formation
- Underlies: Ione Formation (regionally)
- Overlies: Martinez Formation (regionally), Chico Formation (regionally)
- Thickness: 2,100–2,300 feet (640–700 m)

Lithology
- Primary: conglomerate, shale

Location
- Region: California
- Country: United States

Type section
- Named for: Fort Tejon

The Tejon Formation is a Paleogene period geologic formation in California.

== Geology ==
The formation regionally overlies the Martinez Formation or the Chico Formation. Paleontology in the Tejon Formation indicates a more tropical climate than during the Martinez Formation's period, with fauna that flourished in its littoral conditions.

=== Occurrences ===
It is predominantly found in the Fort Tejon area of the San Emigdio Mountains and Tehachapi Mountains in Kern County, and around Martinez in Contra Costa County.

Areas it surfaces, south to north, include:

- Santa Ana Mountains
- Santa Monica Mountains — near Calabasas.
- Simi Hills — eastern section
- Santa Susana Mountains — section in northwestern Simi Valley
- Santa Clara River Valley — Rancho Camulos area
- Topatopa Mountains — Sespe gorge area
- Fort Tejon area of the San Emigdio Mountains and Tehachapi Mountains
- San Joaquin Valley−Diablo Range — New Idria Mercury Mine area
- Mount Diablo — northern area
- Martinez area on the Sacramento Delta
- Clear Lake — Lower Lake area

== Fossils ==
It preserves prehistoric plant and fauna fossils dating back to the Paleogene period of the Cenozoic Era.

=== Species ===
Species (1897 taxa names) found only in the Tejon Formation include:

- Cardita horni
- Fusus sequileteralis
- Megistostigma striata
- Modiola ornata
- Morio tuberculatus
- Telina martinezensis
- Telina horni
- Thracia karquinezensis
- Turritella conica
- Turritella infragranulata
- Tritonium eocenicum

== See also ==
- List of fossiliferous stratigraphic units in California
- Paleogene California
- Paleontology in California
