= Yorio =

Yorio is a surname. Notable people with the surname include:

- Lucas Di Yorio (born 1996), Argentine footballer
- María Rosa Yorio (born 1954), Argentine painter, singer, songwriter, and band leader

== See also ==
- Morio
