= Macrolobium taylorii =

Conservation status
- Vulnerable (IUCN 2.3)

Scientific classification
- Kingdom: Plantae
- Clade: Tracheophytes
- Clade: Angiosperms
- Clade: Eudicots
- Clade: Rosids
- Order: Fabales
- Family: Fabaceae
- Genus: Macrolobium
- Species: M. taylorii

Binomial name
- Macrolobium taylorii D.R.Simpson

Species of plant

Macrolobium taylorii is a species of plant in the family Fabaceae. It is found only in Peru.
