= Martinez Formation =

Eocene Epoch geologic formation in California

- Stratigraphic range: Eocene
- Type: Geologic formation
- Underlies: Tejon Formation (regionally), Ione Formation (regionally)
- Overlies: Chico Formation

Location
- Region: California
- Country: United States

The Martinez Formation is an Eocene Epoch geologic formation in California.

== Geology ==
The formation regionally overlies the Chico Formation and regionally underlies the Tejon Formation or the Ione Formation.

It is exposed in the Clevelin Hills in Riverside County, Santa Ana Mountains in Orange County, northwestern Santa Monica Mountains near Calabasas (California) in Los Angeles County, and north of Mount Diablo/south of the Sacramento Delta in Contra Costa County.

=== Fossils ===
The formation preserves fossils dating back to the Paleogene period.

== See also ==
- List of fossiliferous stratigraphic units in California
- Paleogene California
- Paleontology in California
