= 1941 in paleontology =

Paleontology or palaeontology is the study of prehistoric life forms on Earth through the examination of plant and animal fossils. This includes the study of body fossils, tracks (ichnites), burrows, cast-off parts, fossilised feces (coprolites), palynomorphs and chemical residues. Because humans have encountered fossils for millennia, paleontology has a long history both before and after becoming formalized as a science. This article records significant discoveries and events related to paleontology that occurred or were published in the year 1941.

== Angiosperms ==
Name	Novelty	Status	Authors	Age	Unit	Location	Synonymized taxa	Notes	Images
Laurophyllum litseafolia	Sp nov	jr synonym	MacGinitie	Eocene; Ypresian	Ione Formation; Chalk Bluffs flora	USA; California		A dicot of uncertain affinity. Moved to Artocarpoides litseafolia (1968); Moved to Dicotylophyllum litseafolia (1969); Moved to Republica litseafolia (1987)	

== Arthropods ==
=== Insects ===
Name	Novelty	Status	Authors	Age	Unit	Type Location	Notes	Images
Electresia	Gen. et sp. nov	Valid	Kuznetsov	Holocene		Tanzania	A Tortricidae moth in copal. The type species is E. zalesskii.	Electresia zalesskii
Proraphidia	Gen et sp nov	Valid	Martynova	Jurassic		Kazakhstan	P. turkestanica named as type species	

== Conodonts ==
Name	Status	Authors	Age	Location	Notes	Images
Bactrognathus	Valid	Maurice Mehl; Edward Branson	Carboniferous			
Doliognathus	Valid	Maurice Mehl; Edward Branson	Carboniferous			
Scaliognathus	Valid	Maurice Mehl; Edward Branson	Carboniferous	UK		
Staurognathus	Valid	Maurice Mehl; Edward Branson	Carboniferous			
Taphrognathus	Valid	Maurice Mehl; Edward Branson	Carboniferous			

== Dinosaurs ==
- Psittacosaurus gastroliths documented.

=== Newly named dinosaurs ===
Data are courtesy of George Olshevky's dinosaur genera list.

Name	Status	Authors	Location	Notes	Images
Lufengosaurus	Valid taxon	Yang Z. J. (as Young C. C.)	China		Lufengosaurus
Saurophagus	Preoccupied	Stovall vide: Ray, 1941		Now Saurophaganax.	Lufengosaurus
"Succinodon"	Original fossil was petrified wood with mollusc borings that was misidentified as a jaw bone with tooth sockets.	Friedrich von Huene	Poland		Lufengosaurus

== Plesiosaurs ==
=== New taxa ===
Name	Status	Authors	Location	Notes	Images
Aristonectes	Valid	Cabrera	Antarctica; Argentina; Chile	A Long-Necked Plesiosaur.	Aristonectes

== Synapsids ==
=== Non-mammalian ===
Name	Status	Authors	Age	Location	Notes	Images
Bayloria	Junior Synonym				Synonym of Captorhinus.	
