= Bactrognathidae =

Scientific classification
- Kingdom: Animalia
- Phylum: Chordata
- Infraphylum: Agnatha
- Class: †Conodonta
- Order: †Prioniodinida
- Family: †Bactrognathidae; Lindstrom 1970

Genera
- †Bactrognathus; †Doliognathus; †Staurognathus

Extinct family of jawless fishes

Bactrognathidae is an extinct family of conodonts in the order Prioniodinida.

Genera are Bactrognathus, Doliognathus, and Staurognathus.
