= La Serre =

Commune in Occitanie, France

- Commune
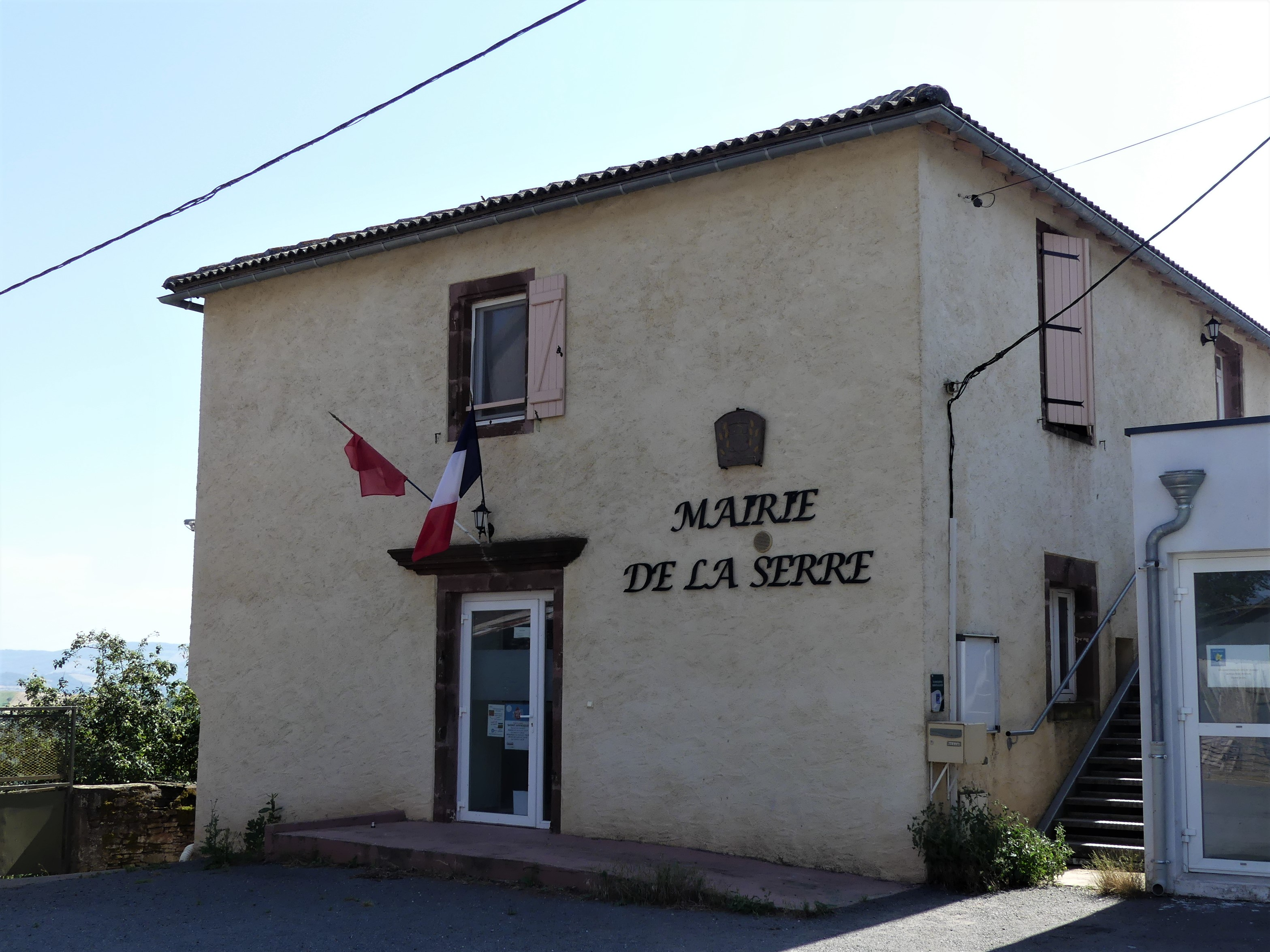
- La Serre Town hall
- Location of La Serre
- Location within France Location within Occitanie
- Coordinates: 43°53′09″N 2°40′57″E
- Country: France
- Region: Occitania
- Department: Aveyron
- Arrondissement: Millau
- Canton: Causses-Rougiers

Government
  - Mayor (2020–2026): Franck Couderc
- Area^{1}: 18.52 km^{2} (7.15 sq mi)
- Elevation: 650 m (2,130 ft)
- Highest elevation: 668 m (2,192 ft)
- Lowest elevation: 398 m (1,306 ft)
- Population (2023): 124
  - Density: 6.70/km^{2} (17.3/sq mi)
- Time zone: UTC+01:00 (CET)
  - Summer (DST): UTC+02:00 (CEST)
- INSEE/Postal code: 12269 /12380
- ^{1} French Land Register data, which excludes lakes, ponds, glaciers > 1 km^{2} (0.386 sq mi or 247 acres) and river estuaries.

La Serre (French pronunciation: [la sɛʁ]; Occitan: La Sèrra) is a commune in the Aveyron department in southern France.

== Population ==
Historical population
Year	Pop.	±% p.a.
1968	326	—
1975	259	−3.23%
1982	204	−3.35%
1990	176	−1.83%
1999	140	−2.51%
2007	136	−0.36%
2012	124	−1.83%
2017	120	−0.65%
2023	124	+0.55%
Source: INSEE

The GSSP Golden Spike for the Tournaisian is in La Serre, with the first appearance of the conodont Siphonodella sulcata. In 2006 it was discovered that this GSSP has biostratigraphic problems.

== See also ==
- Communes of the Aveyron department
