= Edwin Branson =

American paleontologist

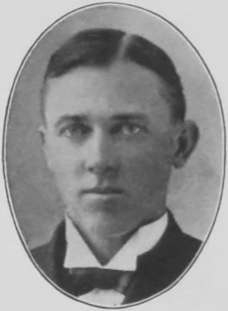
- Born: May 11, 1877
- Died: March 12, 1950 (aged 72)
- Resting place: Unknown
- Occupation: Geologist

Edwin Bayer Branson (May 11, 1877 – March 12, 1950) was an American geologist and paleontologist. He was a professor of geology at the University of Missouri for 37 years.

== Biography ==
Branson was born in Belleville, Kansas, one of six children of John McDowell Branson and Harriet Melviney Bullen. He married Grace Muriel Colton in 1905 in Massachusetts. They had two sons, Carl Colton Branson and Edwin Robert Branson, both of whom became geologists.

From 1895–99, he taught in public schools in Powhattan, Kansas. He first attended Salina Normal University in Kansas and Valparaiso University in Indiana before attending the University of Kansas, earning a bachelor's degree in 1900 and a master's in 1903. He earned his doctorate from the University of Chicago in 1905.

After a long career at the University of Missouri, he retired in 1947. Three years later, he died of a heart condition in Columbia, Missouri, aged 77.

== Academic career ==
After earning his doctorate, Branson taught at Oberlin College in Ohio for five years. He joined the Geology department at the University of Missouri in 1910. During his doctoral studies, he had spent time searching for fossils near Lander, Wyoming and so he determined to set up a camp for the hands-on study of geology and paleontology nearby.

Also in 1911, he came to Lander with a group of students and established the Missouri Field Geology Camp near Sinks Canyon State Park. It was named for him when he retired in 1947. The Branson Field Laboratory appears to be the oldest continually operated field geology camp in the United States.

Eventually Branson formed a scientific partnership with Maurice "Doc" Mehl, another Chicago graduate who joined the Missouri faculty in 1919. Branson retired in 1948, which is when the camp was renamed in his honor.

Branson served as vice president of the Paleontological Society of America. He was also a fellow and member of multiple academic societies, including the American Association for the Advancement of Science, the Geological Society of America, the Society of Economic Paleontologists and Mineralogists, the American Association of Petroleum Geologists, and the Missouri Academy of Sciences.

== Contributions ==
In 1915, Branson wrote a paper on the origin of thick gypsum and salt deposits.

In 1931, he and Maurice Mehl described the extinct genus of heterostracan agnathan Cardipeltis in the Jefferson Formation of Utah.

In 1932, Branson and Mehl reported the presence of Carboniferous-aged fossil footprints of a new ichnospecies in the Tensleep Formation of Wyoming. They named the tracks Steganoposaurus belli and attributed them to an amphibian nearly three feet in length.

The same year, he and Mehl named a new kind of Late Triassic dinosaur footprint discovered in the Popo Agie Formation of western Wyoming. The new ichnogenus and species was named Agialopus wyomingensis.

In 1933, also with Mehl, he described the conodont species Wurmiella excavata.

In 1934, with Mehl, he described the conodont genera Pseudopolygnathus and Ancyrognathus.

In 1938, with Mehl, he reviewed the conodont genus Icriodus.

In 1941, he and Mehl described several conodont genera: Bactrognathus, Doliognathus, Scaliognathus, Staurognathus and Taphrognathus. Also in 1941, with C.C. Branson, he reviewed the geology of the Wind River Mountains in Wyoming.

In 1944, he described with Mehl the conodont genus Siphonodella.

In 1947, with his son Carl Colton Branson, he reviewed the Lower Silurian conodonts from Kentucky.

In 1951, with Mehl and C.C. Branson, he published an article about the Richmond Group conodonts of Kentucky and Indiana.

== See also ==
- 20th century in ichnology
- Paleontology in Wyoming
