= Pseudopolygnathus =

Pseudopolygnathus Temporal range: Late Devonian–Early Carboniferous

Scientific classification
- Kingdom: Animalia
- Phylum: Chordata
- Infraphylum: Agnatha
- Class: †Conodonta
- Order: †Ozarkodinida
- Family: †Polygnathidae
- Genus: †Pseudopolygnathus; Branson & Mehl, 1934

Species
- †Pseudopolygnathus conili; †Pseudopolygnathus controversus; †Pseudopolygnathus crenulata; †Pseudopolygnathus dentilineatus; †Pseudopolygnathus fusiformis; †Pseudopolygnathus granulobatus; †Pseudopolygnathus granulosus; †Pseudopolygnathus granulosus laepensis; †Pseudopolygnathus granulosus salawinensis; †Pseudopolygnathus granulosus maepoensis; †Pseudopolygnathus graulichi; †Pseudopolygnathus marginatus; †Pseudopolygnathus minutus; †Pseudopolygnathus multistriatus; †Pseudopolygnathus oxypageus

Extinct genus of jawless fishes

Pseudopolygnathus is an extinct genus of conodonts in the family Polygnathidae.

Pseudopolygnathus granulobatus is from the Late Devonian or Early Carboniferous of Italy.

The three subspecies of P. granulosus, P. g. laepensis, P. g. salawinensis and P. g. maepoensis are from the Late Devonian of Thailand.
