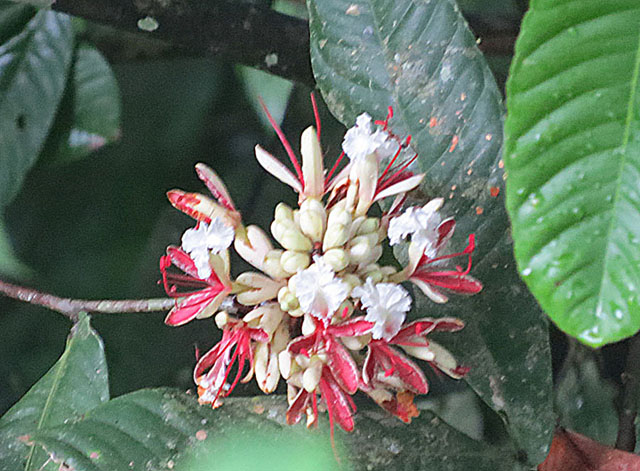

Conservation status
- Least Concern (IUCN 3.1)

Scientific classification
- Kingdom: Plantae
- Clade: Tracheophytes
- Clade: Angiosperms
- Clade: Eudicots
- Clade: Rosids
- Order: Fabales
- Family: Fabaceae
- Genus: Macrolobium
- Species: M. pittieri

Binomial name
- Macrolobium pittieri (Rose) Schery

Synonyms
- Vouapa pittieri Rose

= Macrolobium pittieri =

Species of legume

Macrolobium pittieri is a species of flowering plant in the family Fabaceae. It is a tree native to Colombia and Panama. It is threatened by habitat loss.
