= Siphonodella =

Siphonodella Temporal range: Late Devonian–Tournaisian

Scientific classification
- Kingdom: Animalia
- Phylum: Chordata
- Class: †Conodonta
- Genus: †Siphonodella Branson and Mehl 1944

Species
- †Siphonodella banraiensis; †Siphonodella carinata; †Siphonodella duplicata (type); †Siphonodella isosticha; †Siphonodella kalvodai; †Siphonodella nandongensis; †Siphonodella quadruplicata; †Siphonodella sulcata; †Siphonodella thompfelli; †Siphonodella uralica

Extinct genus of jawless fishes

Siphonodella is an extinct genus of conodonts.

Siphonodella banraiensis is from the Late Devonian of Thailand. Siphonodella nandongensis is from the Early Carboniferous of the Baping Formation in China.

== Use in stratigraphy ==
The Tournaisian, the oldest age of the Mississippian (also known as Lower Carboniferous) contains eight conodont biozones, two of which are characterized by Siphonodella species:

- the zone of Gnathodus typicus and Siphonodella isosticha
- the zone of Siphonodella quadruplicata and Patrognathus andersoni (upper zone of Patrognathus andersoni)

The GSSP Golden Spike for the Tournaisian is in La Serre, Montagne Noire, France with the first appearance of Siphonodella sulcata. In 2006 it was discovered that this GSSP has biostratigraphic problems.
