= Tridentichnus =

Trace fossil classification
- Domain: Eukaryota
- Kingdom: Animalia
- Phylum: Chordata
- Order: †Temnospondyli
- Ichnogenus: †Tridentichnus; Gilmore, 1927

Trace fossil

Tridentichnus is an ichnogenus of fossil footprints. The Tridentichnus trackmaker was a relatively large animal with five toes on its hind feet. They are preserved in the Supai Formation and located in Arizona, United States. The ichnospecies Steganoposaurus belli are similar footprints preserved in the Tensleep Sandstone of Wyoming.
