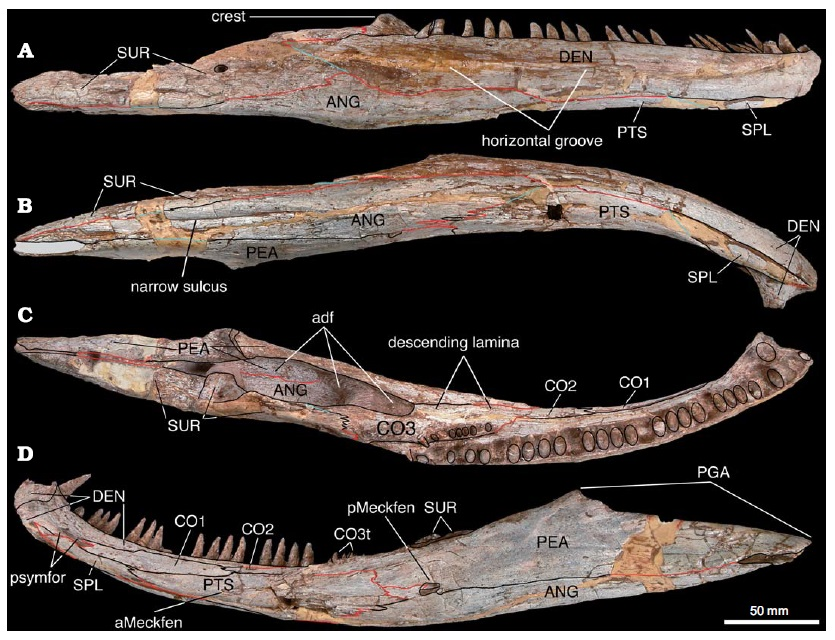
- Holotype specimen of Hadrokkosaurus bradyi

Scientific classification
- Kingdom: Animalia
- Phylum: Chordata
- Clade: Tetrapoda
- Order: †Temnospondyli
- Suborder: †Stereospondyli
- Family: †Brachyopidae
- Genus: †Hadrokkosaurus; Welles, 1957

Type species
- †Hadrokkosaurus bradyi Welles, 1947 (originally Taphrognathus bradyi)

= Hadrokkosaurus =

Hadrokkosaurus Temporal range: Middle Triassic

Extinct genus of amphibians

Hadrokkosaurus is an extinct genus of brachyopoid temnospondyl amphibian from the Middle Triassic of Arizona. It includes a single species, Hadrokkosaurus bradyi, known from the Moenkopi Formation.

== History of study ==
Hadrokkosaurus was first named for the type and only species, H. bradyi, as "Taphrognathus bradyi" by Welles (1947) based on an isolated lower right hemimandible from the Holbrook Quarry (UCMP V 3922 near Holbrook, AZ) in the Holbrook Member of the Moenkopi Formation. Hadrokkosaurus was formally introduced by Welles (1957) as a replacement name due to the preoccupation of Taphrognathus by a conodont. Although subsequent material was referred to H. bradyi by Welles & Estes (1969), most notably a nearly complete skull, much of this material was subsequently placed in a new taxon, Vigilius wellesi, by Warren & Marsicano (2000); previous work had also expressed some uncertainty over the conspecificity of holotype of H. bradyi with the now-holotype of V. wellesi, with some suggestion that the former might not even be a temnospondyl hemimandible. The holotype of V. wellesi was collected from the Holbrook Member but over 160 km away from the Holbrook Quarry, whereas the remaining referred material (transferred to V. wellesi as well, mostly cranial and some postcranial fragments) were collected from the Holbrook Quarry. Warren & Marsicano thus restricted H. bradyi to the holotype.

Ruta & Bolt (2008) re-examined the type of Hadrokkosaurus bradyi and previously referred material and referred numerous fragmentary hemimandibular specimens, many of which Warren & Marsicano (2000) had referred to V. wellesi and a few of which they cautioned might not in fact belong to Hadrokkosaurus. These workers reaffirmed the temnospondyl affinities of the type of H. bradyi. The most recent study of this taxon was by So & Mann (2024), who examined all of the material previously or currently referred to H. bradyi from the Holbrook Quarry. They removed several specimens from H. bradyi and instead referred them to another, presently unnamed brachyopoid based on differences in dentition and several of the hemimandibular elements. An isolated angular was also removed from H. bradyi and referred to a third taxon, a presently indeterminate temnospondyl.

Hadrokkosaurus-like material has also been reported from approximately coeval Middle Triassic deposits in India and Algeria.

== Anatomy ==
The holotype of Hadrokkosaurus bradyi is a complete right hemimandible and the most complete specimen. The hemimandible has a broad curvature typical for brachycephalic temnospondyls. It has 32 tooth positions on the dentary, with teeth that are labiolingualy compressed towards the crown and carinated. It has an unusually long post-glenoid area (PGA).

So & Mann's (2024) revised diagnosis list a unique combination of five features as diagnostic for Hadrokkosaurus bradyi: "total length of angular ventrolateral margin greater than or equal to half of total lateral mandible length; angular posteriormost margin straight in lateral aspect; greatest depth of angular lateral surface less than or equal to greatest depth of dentary lateral surface; ventral margin of posterior Meckelian fenestra formed only by angular; anterior Meckelian fenestra in middle third of postsplenial mesial lamina." This represents a revision of a more expansive combination of features listed by Ruta & Bolt (2008) in their revised diagnosis.

== Phylogenetic relationships ==
Due to the changes in which specimens are referable to Hadrokkosaurus bradyi and the relatively incomplete nature of the holotype, the relationships of H. bradyi have been challenging to discern. Early workers frequently classified it as a brachyopid. Ruta & Bolt (2008) recovered the taxon at the base of Brachyopidae in a broad temnospondyl-wide analysis of lower jaw characters. However, some more recent workers have preferred a Brachyopoidea classification, and several analyses by So & Mann (2024) recovered the taxon in different positions within Brachyopoidea but not in a clade with more unambiguous brachyopids. Both qualitative and quantitative comparisons are hindered by the fact that many brachyopoids are only known from skulls or at least not from hemimandibles.
