= Bactrognathus =

Bactrognathus Temporal range: lower Osagean (Lower Carboniferous)

Scientific classification
- Kingdom: Animalia
- Phylum: Chordata
- Infraphylum: Agnatha
- Class: †Conodonta
- Order: †Prioniodinida
- Family: †Bactrognathidae
- Genus: †Bactrognathus; Branson and Mehl 1941

Species
- †Bactrognathus anchorarius; †Bactrognathus distortus; †Bactrognathus excavatus; †Bactrognathus hamatus; †Bactrognathus minutus

Extinct genus of jawless fishes

Bactrognathus is an extinct genus of conodonts in the family Bactrognathidae.
