= Macrolobium amplexans =

Conservation status
- Vulnerable (IUCN 2.3)

Scientific classification
- Kingdom: Plantae
- Clade: Tracheophytes
- Clade: Angiosperms
- Clade: Eudicots
- Clade: Rosids
- Order: Fabales
- Family: Fabaceae
- Genus: Macrolobium
- Species: M. amplexans

Binomial name
- Macrolobium amplexans (Amshoff) Cowan

Species of legume

Macrolobium amplexans is a species of plant in the family Fabaceae. It is found in Suriname.
