= Macrolobium stenopetalum =

Conservation status
- Vulnerable (IUCN 2.3)

Scientific classification
- Kingdom: Plantae
- Clade: Tracheophytes
- Clade: Angiosperms
- Clade: Eudicots
- Clade: Rosids
- Order: Fabales
- Family: Fabaceae
- Genus: Macrolobium
- Species: M. stenopetalum

Binomial name
- Macrolobium stenopetalum Amsh.

Species of legume

Macrolobium stenopetalum is a species of plant in the family Fabaceae. It is found in Suriname.
