= Wurmiella =

Scientific classification
- Kingdom: Animalia
- Phylum: Chordata
- Infraphylum: Agnatha
- Class: †Conodonta
- Order: †Ozarkodinida
- Family: †Spathognathodontidae
- Genus: †Wurmiella; Murphy, Valenzuela-Ríos and Carls, 2004

Species
- Wurmiella excavata (Branson & Mehl, 1933), syn. Ozarkodina excavata; Wurmiella tuma; Wurmiella wurmi

Extinct genus of jawless fishes

Wurmiella is an extinct conodont genus.

Wurmiella excavata is from the Lower Devonian of Nevada.
