= Amphekepubis =

Amphekepubis Temporal range: Late Cretaceous, 89.3–84.9 Ma

Scientific classification
- Kingdom: Animalia
- Phylum: Chordata
- Class: Reptilia
- Order: Squamata
- Clade: †Mosasauria
- Family: †Mosasauridae
- Genus: †Amphekepubis; Mehl, 1930
- Species: †A. johnsoni

Binomial name
- †Amphekepubis johnsoni Mehl, 1930

Genus of lizards

Amphekepubis is a dubious genus of mosasaur from the Late Cretaceous of Mexico. Its remains correspond to the holotype specimen UM VP 509, which includes a partial skeleton preserved in three dimensions. This specimen comprises the pelvic area, hind limb bones and nine caudal vertebrae. It was found in the east of Monterrey, in the state of Nuevo Leon, within marine sediments (claystones) apparently from the San Felipe Formation, corresponding to the boundary between the Coniacian and Santonian age of the early Late Cretaceous. Amphekepubis is classified under the Mosasaurinae subfamily of mosasaurs.

It has been suggested that the age of the fossils assigned to Amphekepubis may actually be more recent and could even belong to the genus Mosasaurus. Some recent reviews have assigned this type specimen to Mosasaurus.
