= Staurognathus =

Staurognathus Temporal range: Lower Carboniferous

Scientific classification
- Kingdom: Animalia
- Phylum: Chordata
- Infraphylum: Agnatha
- Class: †Conodonta
- Order: †Prioniodinida
- Family: †Bactrognathidae
- Genus: †Staurognathus; Branson and Mehl, 1941

Species
- †Staurognathus anchoraria; †Staurognathus cruciformis

Extinct genus of jawless fishes

Staurognathus is an extinct genus of conodonts in the family Bactrognathidae from the Middle Dinantian (Lower Carboniferous). It is a genus of multielement conodonts.
