= Macrolobium multijugum =

Scientific classification
- Kingdom: Plantae
- Clade: Tracheophytes
- Clade: Angiosperms
- Clade: Eudicots
- Clade: Rosids
- Order: Fabales
- Family: Fabaceae
- Genus: Macrolobium
- Species: M. multijugum

Binomial name
- Macrolobium multijugum (DC.) Benth.

Synonyms
- Outea multijuga DC.; Vouapa multijuga (DC.) Kuntze; Vouapa multijuga (DC.) Taub.

Species of plant

Macrolobium multijugum is a species of tree in the family Fabaceae that is native to northern South America.

== Taxonomy ==
The species was first described as Outea multijuga DC. (1825) and later transferred to the genus Macrolobium by Bentham in 1870. Two subspecies are accepted: the nominate M. m. var. multijugum, and M. m. var. sinuatum.
