= Tensleep Sandstone =

Geologic formation in Wyoming, United States

Tensleep Formation
- Stratigraphic range: Late Pennsylvanian-very Early Permian; ~308–298 Ma
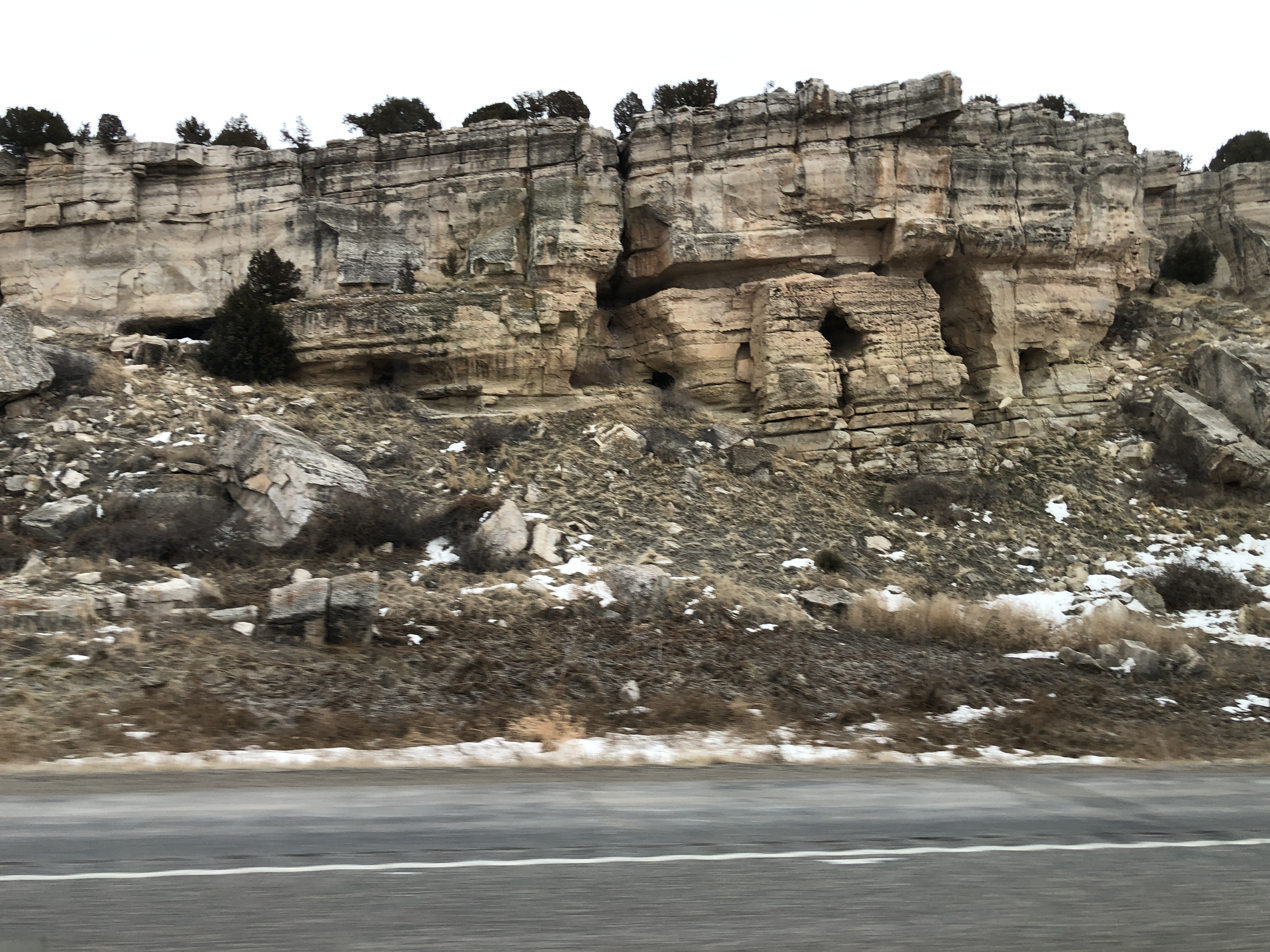
- Type: Geological formation
- Underlies: Phosphoria and Chugwater Formations
- Overlies: Sacajewea and Amsden Formations
- Thickness: up to 535 feet (160 m)

Lithology
- Primary: Sandstone
- Other: Limestone

Location
- Coordinates: 42.6°N 108.2°W
- Approximate paleocoordinates: 4.3°N 35.2°W
- Region: Wyoming
- Country: United States

Type section
- Named for: Ten Sleep, Wyoming
- Named by: N.H. Darton
- Year defined: 1904
- Tensleep Sandstone (the United States) Tensleep Sandstone (Wyoming)

The Tensleep Sandstone is a geological formation of Pennsylvanian to very early Permian age in Wyoming.

The formation is composed of fine- to medium-grained sandstone, light gray and yellowish gray; generally slightly to moderately calcareous; some dolomite and sandy dolomite beds; mostly thick to massive sets of low-angle, wedge-planar crossbeds of dunes. Forms cliffs 61-91m (200-300 feet) thick.

== Trace fossils ==
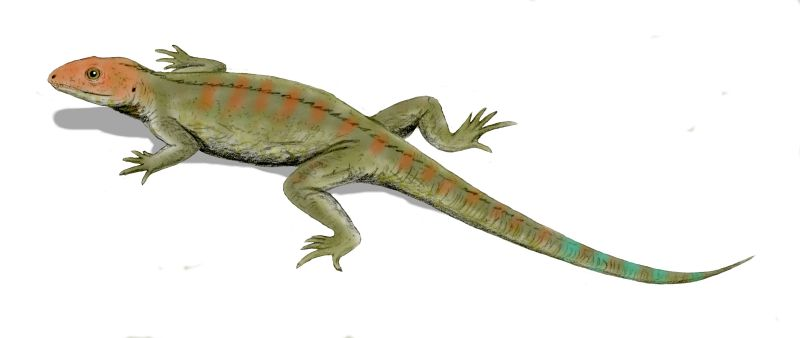
Hylonomus

In 1932 Edward Branson and Maurice Mehl reported the discovery of a fossil trackway in the formation. A new ichnospecies, Steganoposaurus belli, was erected for these footprints. The tracks were probably made by a web-footed animal slightly less than three feet long. This creature was originally presumed to be an amphibian, but the toe prints it left behind were pointed like a reptile's rather than round like an amphibians. The actual trackmaker may have been similar to the genus Hylonomus. The ichnogenus Tridentichnus are similar footprints preserved in the Supai Formation of Arizona.
