= Steganoposaurus =

Trace fossil classification
- Domain: Eukaryota
- Kingdom: Animalia
- Phylum: Chordata
- Class: Reptilia
- Ichnogenus: †Steganoposaurus; Branson & Mehl, 1932

Trace fossil

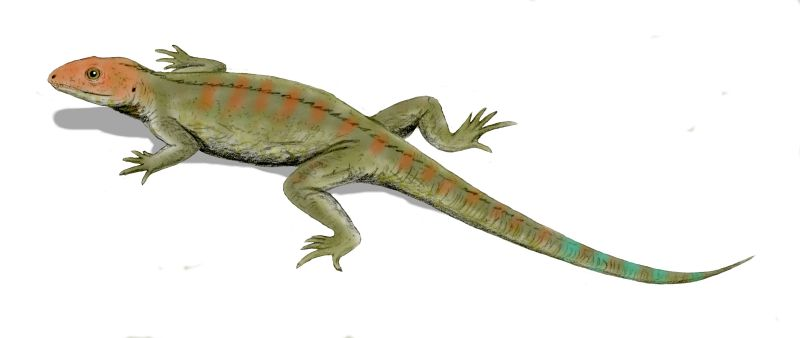
Hylonomus

Steganoposaurus is an ichnogenus of fossil reptile footprints. The ichnospecies Steganoposaurus belli, was erected for footprints discovered in Wyoming's Tensleep Sandstone. The find was first reported to the scientific literature by Edward Branson and Maurice Mehl in 1932. This creature was originally presumed to be an amphibian, but the toe prints it left behind were pointed like a reptile's rather than round like an amphibians. The actual trackmaker may have been similar to the genus Hylonomus. The ichnogenus Tridentichnus are similar footprints preserved in the Supai Formation of Arizona.
