= Yegua Formation =

Geologic formation in Texas, United States

- Stratigraphic range: Paleogene
- Type: Formation

Location
- Region: Texas
- Country: United States

The Yegua Formation is a geologic formation in Texas. It preserves fossils dating back to the Paleogene period.

== Geological Structure ==
The Yegua Formation is a minor siliciclastic progradation off the Gulf of Mexico shelf margin. It lies between the larger Early Eocene and the Oligocene shelf-margin progradations.

During Yegua time, around four to eight sea-level fluctuations with a 100-300 ka period pushed marine rocks toward the basin margins and pushed deltaic sedimentation to and past the shelf edge. Due to the limited sand supply and the flat coastal plains, the updip depositional complexes are almost entirely separated from the downdip shelf-edge deltas and slope fans. Maximum flooding surfaces can be mapped over much of the area and correlated along and across the basin.

The Yegua formation can truly be called a natural laboratory for the study of sequence stratigraphy.

A number of plays in the downdip and 'mid-dip' (incised valley complexes) trends have resulted in more than 4 TCF of gas and condensate, and new discoveries await the return of exploration capital. The story of the formation of the structure at Yegua is also of great significance and interest to the students of siliciclastic stratigraphy in passive-margin settings.

== See also ==
- List of fossiliferous stratigraphic units in Texas
- Paleontology in Texas
