= Wilcox Formation =

Geologic formation in Vermont, United States

- Stratigraphic range: Middle Proterozoic
- Type: Formation
- Unit of: Mount Holly Complex
- Thickness: 915 meters (3,002 ft)

Location
- Region: Vermont
- Country: United States

Type section
- Named for: Wilcox Hill, Rutland County, Vermont
- Named by: Brace (1953)

The Wilcox Formation is a geologic formation in Vermont that is part of the Holly Mountain Complex. It is exposed within the western parts of Mendon and Shrewsbury, Vermont. The type locality of the Wilcox Formation lies on the slopes south of Cold River of the eponymous Wilcox Hill and on northwest slope of Mendon Peak.

The Wilcox Formation consists primarily of dark-gray to brownish-gray, muscovite rich, chlorite-quartz schist. The schist is locally interbedded with either beds of chlorite-spotted, vitreous quartzite too small to map or prominent beds of vitreous quartzite as much as 10 meters (33 ft) thick. This formation has a distinctive shredded, schistose appearance because of closely-spaced foliation and rusty-weathering cleavage. Elsewhere within the Wilcox Formation, thin beds of white graphite-dolomite marble, and retrograded deep-orange-to tan-weathering dolomite are common. At the type locality on Wilcox Hill and on the slopes south of Cold River, the schist contains pods of aplitic gneiss and veins rich in tourmaline.

== See also ==
- Geologic Unit: Wilcox, The National Geological Database, United States Geological Survey, Reston, Virginia.
- Green Mountains

See also for Premium Member Geocachers

- OUTCROPPINGS OF THE WILCOX FORMATION
