= 1925 in paleontology =

Paleontology or palaeontology is the study of prehistoric life forms on Earth through the examination of plant and animal fossils. This includes the study of body fossils, tracks (ichnites), burrows, cast-off parts, fossilised feces (coprolites), palynomorphs and chemical residues. Because humans have encountered fossils for millennia, paleontology has a long history both before and after becoming formalized as a science. This article records significant discoveries and events related to paleontology that occurred or were published in the year 1925.

== Plants ==
=== Liverworts ===
Name	Novelty	Status	Authors	Age	Unit	Location	Synonymized taxa	Notes	Images
Lejeunea eophila	Sp nov.	jr synonym	Cockerell	Eocene; Ypresian	Green River Formation	United States; Colorado		A leafy liverwort morphospecies. Moved to Jungermannites eophila (1947).	Jungermannites eophila

=== Angiosperms ===
Name	Novelty	Status	Authors	Age	Unit	Location	Synonymized taxa	Notes	Images
Alsinites	Gen et sp. nov	valid	Cockerell	Eocene; Wasatchian	Green River Formation	United States; Colorado		A carnation family flower morphospecies.	Alsinites revelatus
Amorpha utensis	Sp. nov	valid	Cockerell	Eocene; Wasatchian	Green River Formation	United States; Colorado		A legume leaf morphospecies.	Amorpha utensis
Banksites lineatulus	Sp. nov	jr synonym	Cockerell	Eocene; Wasatchian	Green River Formation	United States; Colorado		First named as a proteaceous seed morphotype Synonymized into Cedrelospermum nervosum in 1989)	Cedrelospermum nervosum
Bumelia coloradensis	Sp. nov	jr synonym	Cockerell	Eocene; Wasatchian	Green River Formation	United States; Colorado		First named as a sapotaceous leaf morphospecies Synonymized into Leguminosites lesquereuxiana by 1952	Leguminosites lesquereuxiana
Clethra? lepidioides	Sp. nov	jr synonym	Cockerell	Eocene; Wasatchian	Green River Formation	United States; Colorado		A tetramelaceous fruit morphotype Moved to Parvaspicula lepidioidea in 2023	Parvaspicula lepidioidea
Dalbergia knowltoni	Sp. nov	jr synonym	Cockerell	Eocene; Wasatchian	Green River Formation	United States; Colorado		First named as a legume leaf morphospecies. Synonymized into Leguminosites lesquereuxiana by 1952	Leguminosites lesquereuxiana
Liquidambar callarche	Sp. nov	valid	Cockerell	Eocene; Wasatchian	Green River Formation	United States; Colorado		A sweet-gum species.	Liquidambar callarche
Lomatia obtusiuscula	Sp. nov	jr synonym	Cockerell	Eocene; Wasatchian	Green River Formation	United States; Colorado		First named as a Lomatia leaf morphotype Synonymized into "Cardiospermum" coloradensis in 1969)	"Cardiospermum" coloradensis
Melia coloradensis	Comb. nov	jr synonym	(Knowlton) Cockerell	Eocene; Wasatchian	Green River Formation	United States; Colorado		Identified as a Melia leaf morphotype Moved from Phyllites coloradensis (1923); Moved to Lomatia coloradensis in 1929; Moved to "Cardiospermum" coloradensis in 1969)	"Cardiospermum" coloradensis
Populus wilmattae	Sp. nov	valid	Cockerell	Eocene; Wasatchian	Green River Formation	United States; Colorado		An Aspen/cottonwood relative.	Populus wilmattae
Potentilla? byrami	Sp. nov	jr synonym	Cockerell	Eocene; Wasatchian	Green River Formation	United States; Colorado		First named as a possible potentilla flower morphospecies Synonymized into Pseudosalix handleyi by 2003	Pseudosalix handleyi

== Arthropods ==
=== Insects ===
Name	Novelty	Status	Authors	Age	Unit	Location	Notes	Images
Cardiophorus exhumatus	Sp. nov	valid	Cockerell	Eocene; Wasatchian	Green River Formation	United States; Colorado	An elaterid click beetle species.	Cardiophorus exhumatus
Cyttaromyia obdurescens	Sp. nov	valid	Cockerell	Eocene; Wasatchian	Green River Formation	United States; Colorado	A long-bodied cranefly.	
Eoliarus	Gen, sp. et comb nov	valid	Cockerell	Eocene; Wasatchian	Green River Formation	United States; Colorado	A Fulgoroid plant hopper genus. The type species is E. quadristictus The genus also includes Oliarus? lutensis (1890).	Eoliarus quadristictus
Inocellia exusta	Sp nov	jr synonym	Cockerell & Custer	Eocene; Priabonian	Florissant Formation	USA; Colorado	An inocelliid snakefly moved to Fibla exusta in 1936	Fibla exusta
Mesoraphidia	Fam, Gen, et 4 sp nov	valid	Martynov	Late Jurassic	Karabastau Formation	Kazakhstan	A snakefly The type genus of the new family Mesoraphidiidae; Includes the new species M. elongata, M. grandis, M. inaequalis, and M. similis	
Thamnotettix packardi	Sp. nov	valid	Cockerell	Eocene; Wasatchian	Green River Formation	United States; Colorado	A cicadellid leafhopper.	Thamnotettix packardi

== Archosauromorpha ==
=== General pseudosuchian research ===
- Longman describes a crocodilian skull discovered at Lansdown Station in Australia, assigning it to the genus Pallimnarchus (now Paludirex).

=== Dinosaurs ===
Taxon	Novelty	Status	Author(s)	Age	Unit	Location	Notes	Images
Arrhinoceratops brachyops	Gen et sp nov	Valid	Parks	Cretaceous; Maastrichtian	Horseshoe Canyon Formation	Canada; Alberta	A ceratopsid	
Trachodon amurense	Sp. nov.	Nomen dubium	Riabinin	Cretaceous; Maastrichtian	Yuliangze Formation	China	A species of Trachodon later given the genus name Mandschurosaurus	

=== Newly named plesiosaurs ===
Name	Status	Authors	Age	Location	Notes	Images
Tapinosaurus	nomen invalidum	Rabeck			Mislabeling of an image, not a valid genus name	

== Synapsids ==
=== Non-mammalian ===
Name	Status	Authors	Age	Location	Notes	Images
Lycaenodon	Valid	Broom	257 Millions of years ago	South Africa		
Lycaenoides	Valid	Broom				
Lycaenops	Valid	Broom		South Africa; Zambia	A Dog-like Gorgonopsian.	Lycaenops
Notosollasia	Jr. synonym				Jr. synonym of Theriognathus.	

=== Mammals ===
Name	Novelty	Status	Authors	Age	Unit	Location	Notes	Images
Ardynictis	Gen et sp nov	Valid	Matthew & Granger	Late Eocene	Ergilin Dzo Formation	Mongolia	A didymoconid, type species is A. furunculus.	
Ardynomys	Gen et sp nov	Valid	Matthew & Granger	Late Eocene	Ergilin Dzo Formation	Mongolia	A rodent, type species is A. olseni.	
Hyaenodon eminus	Sp nov	Valid	Matthew & Granger	Late Eocene	Ergilin Dzo Formation	Mongolia	A hyaenodont	
