= Mount Selman Formation =

Geologic formation in Texas and Mexico

- Stratigraphic range: Paleogene
- Type: Formation

Location
- Country: Mexico

The Mount Selman Formation is a geologic formation in Texas and Mexico.

It preserves fossils dating back to the Paleogene period.

== See also ==
- List of fossiliferous stratigraphic units in Mexico
