= 1934 in paleontology =

Paleontology or palaeontology is the study of prehistoric life forms on Earth through the examination of plant and animal fossils. This includes the study of body fossils, tracks (ichnites), burrows, cast-off parts, fossilised feces (coprolites), palynomorphs and chemical residues. Because humans have encountered fossils for millennia, paleontology has a long history both before and after becoming formalized as a science. This article records significant discoveries and events related to paleontology that occurred or were published in the year 1934.

== Arthropods ==
=== Insects ===
Name	Novelty	Status	Authors	Age	Unit	Location	Notes	Images
Lestes incertus	Sp. nov	synonym	Piton	Piacenzian	Lake Chambon	France	A Lestid damselfly, moved to Sympecma incerta in 1994	Sympecma incerta

== Conodonts ==
Name	Status	Authors	Age	Unit	Location	Notes	Images
Ancyrognathus	Valid	Maurice Mehl; Edward Branson		Glassy Creek Shale of Missouri	USA		
Pseudopolygnathus	Valid	Maurice Mehl; Edward Branson		Glassy Creek Shale of Missouri	USA		

== Reptiles ==
=== Dinosaurs ===
==== Newly named dinosaurs ====
Data courtesy of George Olshevsky's dinosaur genera list.

Name	Status	Authors	Age	Unit	Location	Notes	Images
Bahariasaurus	Valid taxon	Stromer	Late Cretaceous (Cenomanian)	Bahariya Formation	Egypt; Niger; Morocco; Algeria	A Megaraptorian.	Bahariasaurus
Brachypodosaurus	Nomen dubium.	Chakravarti	Maastrichtian	Lameta Formation	India	An ornithischian.	

== Synapsids ==
=== Non-mammalian ===
Name	Status	Authors	Age	Unit	Location	Notes	Images
Arctognathoides	Jr. synonym	Boonstra	Late Permian	Dicynodon Assemblage Zone		A junior synonym of Arctognathus.	
Compsodon	Valid	van Hoepen	Late Permian	Dicynodon Assemblage Zone	South Africa; Zambia	A member of Emydopoidea.	
Daptocephalus	Valid	van Hoepen	Late Permian	Dicynodon Assemblage Zone	South Africa	A member of Dicynodontoidea.	Daptocephalus
Emydopsoides	Jr. synonym	van Hoepen	Late Permian	Cistecephalus Assemblage Zone		A junior synonym of Emydops.	
Pachyrhinos	Jr. synonym	Broili and Schroeder	Middle Permian	Middle Abrahamskraal Formation		A junior synonym of Gorgonops.	
Pelorocyclops	Jr. synonym	van Hoepen	Late Permian	Cistecephalus Assemblage Zone		A junior synonym of Rhachiocephalus.	

=== Mammals ===
Name	Novelty	Status	Authors	Age	Unit	Location	Notes	Images
Cephalophus parvus	Sp. nov	Valid	Broom	Late Pliocene-Early Pleistocene	Taung	South Africa	A duiker, potentially synonymous with the blue duiker.	
Gypsorhynchus	Gen. et sp. nov	Valid	Broom	Late Pliocene-Early Pleistocene	Taung	South Africa	A blesmol, type species is G. darti.	
Palaeotragiscus	Gen. et sp. nov	Jr. synonym	Broom	Late Pliocene-Early Pleistocene	Taung	South Africa	Type species is P. longiceps, junior synonym of Oreotragus oreotragus (the klipspringer).	
Pedetes gracilis	Sp. nov	Valid	Broom	Late Pliocene-Early Pleistocene	Taung	South Africa	A springhare.	
Procavia antiqua	Sp. nov	Valid	Broom	Late Pliocene-Early Pleistocene	Taung	South Africa	A hyrax.	
