= Chico Formation =

Cretaceous geologic formation in California and Oregon

- Stratigraphic range: Campanian Age, Cretaceous Period
- Type: Geological formation
- Underlies: Martinez Formation (regionally), Tejon Formation (regionally)
- Overlies: Vaqueros Formation

Lithology
- Primary: sandstone

Location
- Region: California, Oregon
- Country: United States

Type section
- Named for: Chico, California

The Chico Formation is a geologic formation of the Campanian Age during the Cretaceous Period, found in California and southern Oregon.

== Geology ==
The Mesozoic Era formation can regionally overlie the Vaqueros Formation, and can regionally underlie the Martinez Formation or Tejon Formation.

The Chico Formation is exposed in the Southern California Coast Ranges, western San Joaquin Valley, north of Mount Diablo, and in the Chico area of the northeastern Sacramento Valley.

It is also found in the eastern Simi Hills in Bell Canyon and Dayton Canyon, located in Los Angeles and Ventura Counties, near the community of West Hills.

== Paleofauna ==
Size chart of the archosaurs of the Chico Formation

Dinosaur remains are among the fossils that have been recovered from the formation, from the Late Cretaceous of the Mesozoic Era.

=== Species ===
The reptile species listed in the table below date from the Late Cretaceous Epoch.

Vertebrates of the Chico Formation
Genus	Species	Location	Member	Abundance	Notes	Images
Clidastes						Clidastes
Hesperornis						Hesperornis
Ichthyornis						Hesperornis
indet. Pteranodontidae						

== See also ==
- List of fossiliferous stratigraphic units in California
  - List of dinosaur-bearing rock formations
  - List of stratigraphic units with indeterminate dinosaur fossils
- Paleogene California
- Paleontology in California
