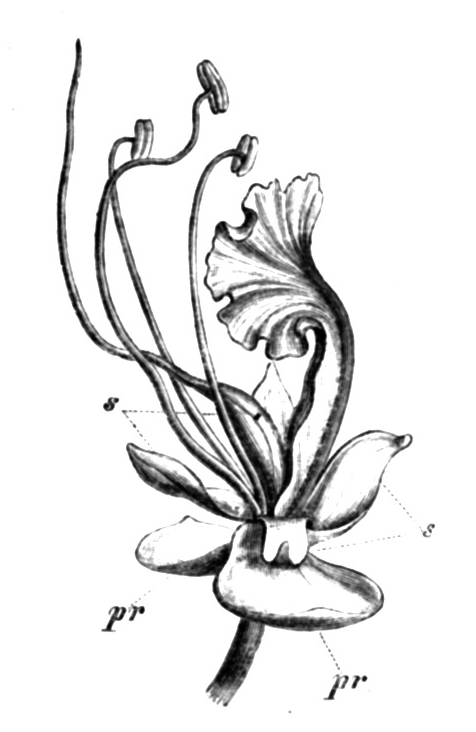
- Macrolobium taxifolium flower

Scientific classification
- Kingdom: Plantae
- Clade: Tracheophytes
- Clade: Angiosperms
- Clade: Eudicots
- Clade: Rosids
- Order: Fabales
- Family: Fabaceae
- Subfamily: Detarioideae
- Tribe: Amherstieae
- Genus: Macrolobium; Schreb.

Species
- About 80, see text

Synonyms
- Outea Aubl.; Pseudovouapa Britton & Rose; Vouapa Aubl.

= Macrolobium =

Genus of legumes

Macrolobium is a legume genus in the subfamily Detarioideae. It is a tropical genus with about 80 species. Half occur in Brazil, where they are common in the floodplains of the Amazonian Basin. Members of the genus are used as ornamentals and for their wood.

== Species ==
Species accepted by the Plants of the World Online as of February 2021:

- Macrolobium acaciifolium (Benth.) Benth.
- Macrolobium acrothamnos R.S.Cowan
- Macrolobium amplexans (Amshoff) R.S.Cowan
- Macrolobium angustifolium (Benth.) R.S.Cowan
- Macrolobium anomalum R.S.Cowan
- Macrolobium aracaense Farroñay
- Macrolobium archeri R.S.Cowan
- Macrolobium arenarium Ducke
- Macrolobium bifolium (Aubl.) Pers.
- Macrolobium brevense Ducke
- Macrolobium campestre Huber
- Macrolobium canaliculatum Spruce ex Benth.
- Macrolobium cataractarum R.S.Cowan
- Macrolobium cidii Barneby
- Macrolobium colombianum (Britton & Killip) Killip
- Macrolobium conjunctum R.S.Cowan
- Macrolobium costaricense W.C.Burger
- Macrolobium cowanii Barneby
- Macrolobium defloccatum R.S.Cowan
- Macrolobium discolor Benth.
- Macrolobium dressleri R.S.Cowan
- Macrolobium duckeanum R.S.Cowan
- Macrolobium evenulosum R.S.Cowan
- Macrolobium exfoliatum R.S.Cowan
- Macrolobium extensum R.S.Cowan
- Macrolobium flexuosum Spruce ex Benth.
- Macrolobium floridum H.Karst.
- Macrolobium froesii R.S.Cowan
- Macrolobium furcatum Ducke
- Macrolobium gracile Spruce ex Benth.
- Macrolobium grallator Barneby
- Macrolobium guianense (Aubl.) Pulle
- Macrolobium hartshornii R.S.Cowan
- Macrolobium herrerae Zarucchi
- Macrolobium huberianum Ducke
- Macrolobium inaequale Little
- Macrolobium ischnocalyx Harms
- Macrolobium jenmanii (Gleason) Sandwith
- Macrolobium klugii R.S.Cowan
- Macrolobium latifolium Vogel
- Macrolobium limbatum Spruce ex Benth.
- Macrolobium longeracemosum Amshoff
- Macrolobium longipedicellatum Ducke
- Macrolobium longipes R.S.Cowan
- Macrolobium machaerioides Killip & J.F.Macbr.
- Macrolobium microcalyx Ducke
- Macrolobium modicopetalum Schery
- Macrolobium molle (Benth.) R.S.Cowan
- Macrolobium montanum Ducke
- Macrolobium multijugum (DC.) Benth.
- Macrolobium obtusum Pittier
- Macrolobium palustre Ducke
- Macrolobium parvifolium (Huber) R.S.Cowan
- Macrolobium pendulum Willd. ex Vogel
- Macrolobium pittieri (Rose) Schery
- Macrolobium prancei R.S.Cowan
- Macrolobium punctatum Spruce ex Benth.
- Macrolobium retusum Huber
- Macrolobium rigidum R.S.Cowan
- Macrolobium rubrum R.S.Cowan
- Macrolobium savannarum R.S.Cowan
- Macrolobium schinifolium R.S.Cowan
- Macrolobium simira (Aubl.) J.F.Gmel.
- Macrolobium spectabile R.S.Cowan
- Macrolobium stenocladum Harms
- Macrolobium stenopetalum Amshoff
- Macrolobium stenosiphon Harms
- Macrolobium steyermarkii R.S.Cowan
- Macrolobium suaveolens Spruce ex Benth.
- Macrolobium taxifolium Spruce ex Benth.
- Macrolobium taylorii D.R.Simpson
- Macrolobium trinitense Urb.
- Macrolobium unifoliolatum R.S.Cowan
- Macrolobium urupaense Hoehne
- Macrolobium venulosum Benth.
- Macrolobium wurdackii R.S.Cowan
