= Morio =

- Gender: Male

Origin
- Origin: Japanese
- Meaning: Different meanings depending on the kanji used

Morio (written: 守男, 守生, 森魚, 森雄, 杜夫, 盛男, 盛夫, 守雄 or 保男) is a masculine Japanese given name. Notable people with the name include:

- Morio Agata (あがた 森魚; born 1948), Japanese singer-songwriter and actor
- Morio Asaka (浅香 守生; born 1967), Japanese anime director
- Morio Higaonna (東恩納 盛男; born 1938), Japanese karateka
- Morio Kazama (風間 杜夫; born 1949), Japanese actor
- Morio Kita (北 杜夫; 1927–2011), pen-name of Sokichi Saitō, Japanese writer and psychiatrist
- Morio Matsudaira (松平 保男; 1878–1944), Imperial Japanese Navy admiral
- Morio Matsui (松井 守男; born 1942), Japanese artist
- Morio Shigematsu (重松 森雄; born 1940), Japanese long-distance runner
- Morio Takahashi (高橋 守雄; 1883–1957), Japanese politician
- Morio Yukawa (湯川 盛夫; 1908–1988), Japanese economist and diplomat
- Morio Kasai (葛西 森夫; 1922-2008), Japanese surgeon

Morio (written: 森尾) is also a Japanese surname. Notable people with the surname include:

- Maiko Morio (森尾 麻衣子; born 1967), Japanese gymnast
