= Maurice Mehl =

American paleontologist

Maurice Goldsmith Mehl
- Born: December 25, 1887; Burlingame, Kansas
- Died: March 30, 1966 (aged 78); Columbia, Missouri
- Other names: "Doc" Mehl
- Scientific career
- Fields: Paleontology
- Institutions: University of Chicago; University of Wisconsin; University of Oklahoma; Denison University; University of Missouri
- Thesis: (1914)
- Doctoral advisor: Samuel Wendell Williston

Maurice Goldsmith Mehl (1887 - 1966) was an American paleontologist and professor in the geology department at the University of Missouri.

== Life and career ==
Mehl was born on December 25, 1887, to Frank and Rebecca Goldsmith Mehl. After graduation from Burlingame High School, he attended the University of Chicago, where he completed a B.S. in 1911 and a Ph.D. in 1914. While at Chicago, he met Lucy Jane Hull and they were married in 1912. At Chicago, Mehl studied vertebrate paleontology under the instruction of prominent paleontologist Samuel Wendell Williston. He taught at Chicago for a while as well as at University of Wisconsin, University of Oklahoma, and Denison University before joining the University of Missouri in 1919. In addition to teaching and researching at Missouri until his retirement in 1958, where he was known as "Doc" Mehl, he also worked as a consultant to the Missouri Geological Survey and Water Resources. While at Missouri, he had a long and productive collaboration with his colleague Edward Branson, with whom many discoveries in paleontology were co-authored. Doc was 78 and living in Columbia at the time of his passing and was survived by his wife Lucy, their two children, and three great-grandchildren.

== Discoveries ==
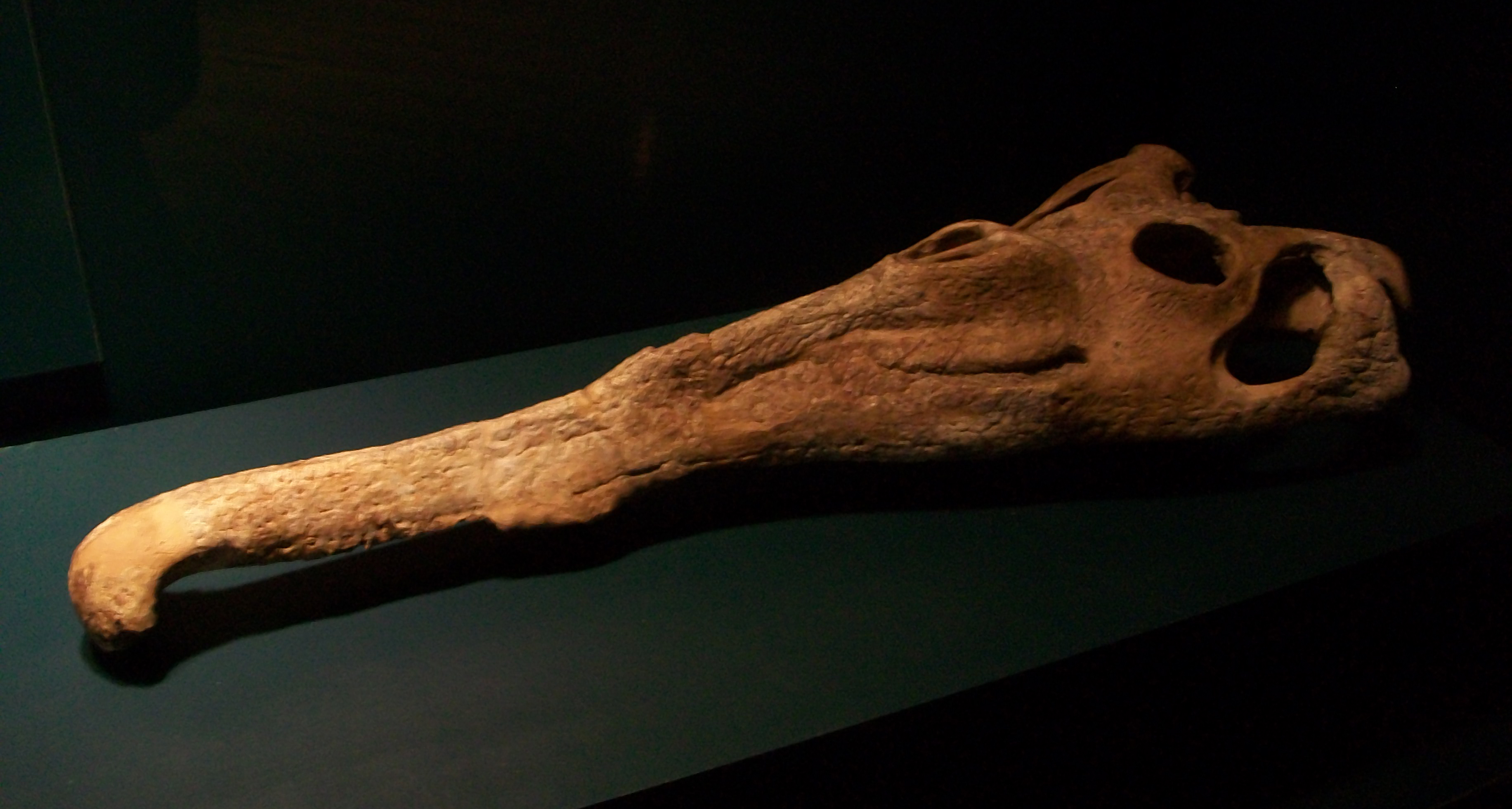
A skull of M. andersoni

In 1922, he named Machaeroprosopus andersoni, on the basis of the holotype FMNH UC 396, partial skull. It was probably collected from the Bull Canyon Formation of the Chinle Group or Dockum Group, probably at the Bull Canyon, in the Guadalupe County of New Mexico. This taxon was considered to be a junior synonym of M. buceros by Long and Murry (1995) and later authors, although Stocker and Butler (2013) treated M. andersoni as a valid species. The holotype is the only known specimen of this species, although there are other specimens from the Bull Canyon Formation that were referred to Arribasuchus buceros by Long and Murry (1995), but not by Stocker and Butler (2013).

In 1929, he and Edward Branson described the Metoposauridae Koskinonodon.

In 1930, he described Amphekepubis, a genus of mosasaur from the Late Cretaceous of Mexico. Their remains correspond to the holotype specimen UM VP 509 (University of Missouri), a partial skeleton preserved in three dimensions, comprising the pelvic area, hind limb bones and nine caudal vertebrae, found in the east of Monterrey, in the state of Nuevo Leon, which come from marine sediments (claystones) apparently from the San Felipe Formation, which corresponds to the boundary between the ages of Coniacian and Santonian in the early Late Cretaceous. However, it has been suggested that age may be more recent and its remains even might belong to the genus Mosasaurus.

In 1931, he erected the new ichnogenus Ignotornis for some bird tracks preserved in the Dakota Group near Golden, Colorado. These were the first scientifically documented Mesozoic bird footprints. The bird in question as interpreted as a "small shorebird or wader". The site would eventually be heavily collected and all of its tracks were presumed removed.

In 1932, he and Branson reported the presence of Carboniferous-aged fossil footprints of a new ichnospecies in the Tensleep Formation of Wyoming. They named the tracks Steganoposaurus belli and attributed them to an amphibian nearly three feet in length.
Also with Edward Branson, he named a new kind of Late Triassic dinosaur footprint discovered in the Popo Agie Formation of western Wyoming. The new ichnogenus and species was named Agialopus wyomingensis.

In 1933, he and Branson described the conodont Wurmiella excavata.

In 1934, with Branson, he described the conodont genera Pseudopolygnathus and Ancyrognathus.

In 1936, he described the new ankylosaur species Nodosaurus coleii.

In 1938, he and Branson reviewed the conodont genus Icriodus.

In 1941, with Branson, he described the conodont genera Bactrognathus, Doliognathus, Scaliognathus and Staurognathus.

In 1944, he described with Branson the conodont genus Siphonodella.

== Awards and honors ==
Mehl was a fellow of the Geological Society of America (1922), the Paleontological Society, and the American Association for the Advancement of Science (1915). He was also a founding member and officer of the American Association of Petroleum Geologists.
