= Leo Lesquereux =

Swiss-born bryologist and a pioneer of American paleobotany

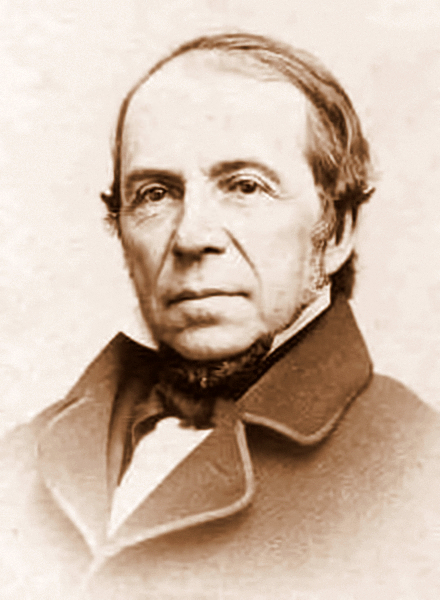
Lesquereux in 1864

Charles Léo Lesquereux (November 18, 1806 – October 25, 1889) was a Swiss-born bryologist and a pioneer of American paleobotany who studied the formation of peat bogs.

== Career ==
Lesquereux was born in the town of Fleurier, located in the canton of Neuchâtel. Despite the fact Lesquereux lacked formal training in botany, he became a celebrated and much published figure in the field of paleobotany. Until 1827 he took classes at the academy at Neuchâtel, and subsequently worked as a tutor of French language in Eisenach, Germany (at the time Prussia). There he tutored many higher-class individuals, including some children of royalty. Afterwards he returned to Switzerland as a schoolteacher, and later principal at the College of La Chaux-de-Fonds. In 1833 he suffered a total loss of hearing due illness and a fall from a cliff. He attempted to obtained treatment from a noted French otologist Jean-Marc Gaspard Itard but was treated disrespectfully and given painful injections of fluid although he was fortunate not to receive some of Itard's other experimental treatments that included like electric shocks, puncturing the eardrum or fracturing the skull with a hammer supposedly to drain fluids. After recovering, he met made many excursions in order to collect mosses in the Jura Mountains, eventually leading to investigations of peat bogs. His pioneer research and analysis on the origin, composition and development of peat resulted in a close friendship with famed scientist Louis Agassiz (1807–1873). Soon afterwards, Lesquereux was commissioned by the Prussian government to perform scientific studies of peat bogs throughout Europe.

In 1848 Lesquereux followed Agassiz to the United States, subsequently residing in Columbus, Ohio, where he performed bryological research with William Starling Sullivant (1803–1873). He published a two volume work on the mosses Icones Muscorum (1864). With Sullivant, he published two editions of an exsiccata work called Musci Boreali-Americani Quorum Specimina Exsiccata (1856, 1865). Lesquereux could read lips in three different languages but his English pronunciation was imperfect as he learned the language after turning deaf. He became the first elected member of the National Academy of Sciences.

Based on his past studies of European peat bogs, Lesquereux developed theories on the origin of coal formations. As a consultant for state geological surveys in several U.S. states, he performed pioneer investigations of Paleozoic flora. From these paleobotanical studies, his best work was a study of carboniferous flora of Pennsylvania, titled "Atlas to the Coal Flora of Pennsylvania and the Carboniferous Formation throughout the United States" (1879–84), a three-volume publication that became a standard for U.S. carboniferous flora.

Lesquereux was elected to the American Philosophical Society in 1861. The plant genus Lesquerella from the family Brassicaceae and the testate amoeba genus Lesquereusia are named in his honor. Lesquereux died at the age of 82 on October 25, 1889, in Columbus, Ohio and buried in Green Lawn Cemetery
