= Ione Formation =

Eocene Epoch geologic formation in California

- Stratigraphic range: Eocene
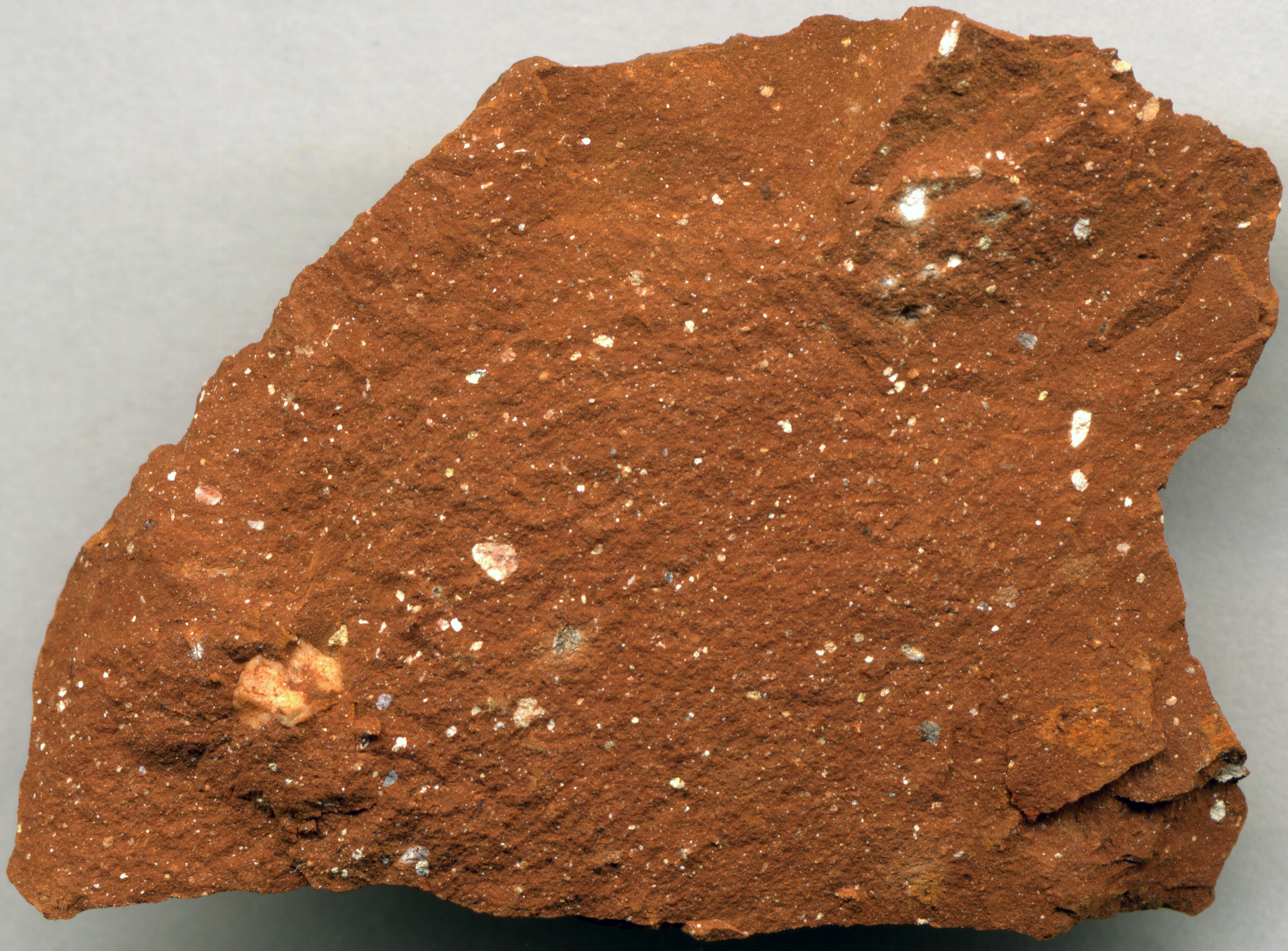
- A rock from the Ione Formation
- Type: Geologic formation
- Underlies: Chico Formation (regionally)
- Overlies: Martinez Formation (regionally)

Location
- Region: California
- Country: United States

The Ione Formation is an Eocene Epoch geologic formation in California.

== Geology ==
The formation regionally overlies the Martinez Formation and regionally underlies the Chico Formation.

=== History ===
The auriferous gravels accumulated on slope of Sierra Nevada during the Neocene Period, and at same time there was deposited in the gulf then occupying the Great Valley a sedimentary series consisting of clays and sands.

=== Description ===
It is usually overlain by a few feet of reddish Pleistocene gravel and rests on Chico formation. The strata form flat-topped hills, and consists of a succession of light-colored clays and white or yellowish-white sandstones. The largest development occurs south of American River.

== See also ==
- List of fossiliferous stratigraphic units in California
- Paleogene California
- Paleontology in California
