= Tournaisian =

First stage of the Carboniferous

- 358.86 ± 0.19 – 346.7 ± 0.4 Ma
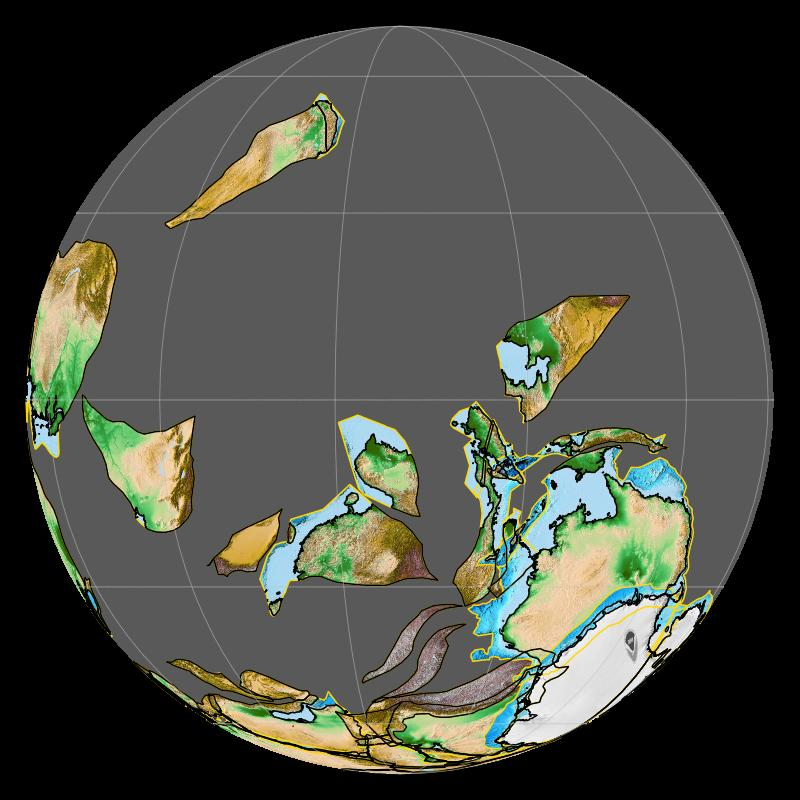
- Paleogeography of the Tournaisian (350 Ma)

Chronology
← / Carboniferous Rainforest Collapse; ← / Mazon Creek Fossils; ← / End of Romer's Gap; ← / Beginning of Romer's Gap
Subdivision of the Carboniferous according to the ICS, as of 2024. Vertical axis scale: Millions of years ago

Etymology
- Name formality: Formal

Usage information
- Celestial body: Earth
- Regional usage: Global (ICS)
- Time scale(s) used: ICS Time Scale

Definition
- Chronological unit: Age
- Stratigraphic unit: Stage
- Time span formality: Formal
- Lower boundary definition: FAD of the conodont Siphonodella sulcata (discovered to have biostratigraphic issues as of 2006).
- Lower boundary GSSP: La Serre hill, Montagne Noire, France; 43.5555°N 3.3573°E
- Lower GSSP ratified: 1990
- Upper boundary definition: FAD of the benthic foraminifer Eoparastaffella simplex
- Upper boundary GSSP: Pengchong Section, Guangxi, China; 24.4333°N 109.4500°E
- Upper GSSP ratified: 2008

The Tournaisian is in the ICS geologic timescale the lowest stage or oldest age of the Mississippian, the oldest subsystem of the Carboniferous. The Tournaisian age lasted from 358.86 Ma to 346.7 Ma. It is preceded by the Famennian (the uppermost stage of the Devonian) and is followed by the Viséan. In global stratigraphy, the Tournaisian contains two substages: the Hastarian (lower Tournaisian) and Ivorian (upper Tournaisian). These two substages were originally designated as European regional stages.

== Name and regional alternatives ==
The Tournaisian was named after the Belgian city of Tournai. It was introduced in scientific literature by Belgian geologist André Hubert Dumont in 1832. Like many Devonian and lower Carboniferous stages, the Tournaisian is a unit from West European regional stratigraphy that is now used in the official international time scale.

The Tournaisian correlates with the regional North American Kinderhookian and lower Osagean stages and the Chinese Tangbagouan regional stage. In the British Isles, where the Hastarian and Ivorian are difficult to distinguish, the entire Tournaisian was equivalent to the Courceyan regional stage.

== Stratigraphy ==
The base of the Tournaisian (which is also the base of the Carboniferous system) is at the first appearance of the conodont Siphonodella sulcata within the evolutionary lineage from Siphonodella praesulcata to Siphonodella sulcata. The first appearance of ammonite species Gattendorfia subinvoluta is just above this and was used as a base for the Carboniferous in the past. The GSSP for the Tournaisian is near the summit of La Serre hill, in the Lydiennes Formation of the commune of Cabrières, in the Montagne Noire (southern France). The GSSP is in a section on the southern side of the hill, in an 80 cm deep trench, about 125 m south of the summit, 2.5 km southwest of the village of Cabrières and 2.5 km north of the hamlet of Fontès.

The top of the Tournaisian (the base of the Viséan) is at the first appearance of the fusulinid species Eoparastaffella simplex (morphotype 1/morphotype 2).

The Tournaisian contains eight conodont biozones:

- the zone of Gnathodus pseudosemiglaber and Scaliognathus anchoralis
- the zone of Gnathodus semiglaber and Polygnathus communis
- the zone of Dollymae bouckaerti
- the zone of Gnathodus typicus and Siphonodella isosticha
- the zone of Siphonodella quadruplicata and Patrognathus andersoni (upper zone of Patrognathus andersoni)
- the lower zone of Patrognathus andersoni
- the zone of Patrognathus variabilis
- the zone of Patrognathus crassus

== Paleoenvironments ==
The Tournaisian coincides with Romer's gap, a period of remarkably few terrestrial fossils, thus constituting a discontinuity between the Devonian and the more modern terrestrial ecosystems of the Carboniferous.

The middle of the Tournaisian is marked by a southern glaciation event, of a slightly lesser extent than the glaciations which swept over Gondwana in the later Carboniferous and the very end of the Devonian. During the Tournaisian, South America was located at south polar latitudes and formed the westernmost part of the supercontinent Gondwana. The southwestern coastline of Gondwana was bustling with distinctive cold-water brachiopod and bivalve faunas.

Coal is less common in the Tournaisian than in the rest of the Carboniferous, and forests and swamps were at low-density despite some trees reaching heights of up to 40 meters (131 feet). Anabranching channels and anastomosing rivers (with permanent channels splitting around large vegetated islands) would not develop until the Viséan, and river systems of the Tournaisian were more similar to those of the Late Devonian.

=== Flora ===
The Tournaisian saw a new diversification of arborescent (tree-sized) lycophytes and giant sphenophytes (horsetails). They coexisted alongside ferns and lignophytes (wood-bearing plants), including early seed plants such as lyginopteridalean pteridosperms ("seed ferns"). The Tournaisian was a transitional stage for lignophyte evolution: Devonian progymnosperm taxa such as Archaeopteris had gone extinct, but new types of woody trees such as Pitus and Protopitys set the stage for even greater morphological diversity. There is still much debate over the proportion of spore-bearing (progymnosperm) to seed-bearing (spermatophyte) woody plants, but both were evidently major parts of Tournaisian ecosystems.

Tropical and subtropical swamps, in what is now Europe, North America, and China, represent a low-latitude paleobiogeographical realm known as the Amerosinian realm. Divaricating (widely branching) trunks of Lepidodendropsis lycophytes are by far the most abundant and widespread plant fossils of the Tournaisian, yet there was some minor variation in other flora through time and space. In eastern North America, lyginopterids and probable progymnosperms were also common, as indicated by leaf form genera such as Adiantites, Rhodeopteridium, and Genselia. The progymnosperm leaf Triphyllopteris may be more common in Europe while the lycophyte Sublepidodendron characterizes Tournaisian China. Late Devonian seed plants like Rhacopteris also persisted into the Tournaisian tropics. Lepidodendron, a massive arborescent lycophyte which would dominate coal forests through the rest of the Carboniferous, first appeared near the Tournaisian-Viséan boundary.

Northern Asia (Kazakhstan and Siberia) was positioned within subtropical or temperate northern latitudes, and developed its own endemic floras, the Angaran realm. The most common plant fossils in this region were shrub-sized lycophytes such as Ursodendron and Tomiodendron, shorter than their arborescent tropical relatives.

Gondwanan plant fossils are uncommon: southernmost Gondwana was covered by dwarf lycophytes, even smaller than those of the Angaran realm. Subtropical and temperate lycophytes such as Lepidodendropsis, Archaeosigillaria, and Frenguellia could be found in some parts of the supercontinent, such as Argentina and Australia. In the middle Tournaisian glaciation, species-poor frigid tundra developed in western Argentina. These south polar tundras hosted the oldest known seed plants in Gondwanan territories, which likely spread south across a land bridge once the Rheic Ocean closed between Laurussia and Gondwana. Tournaisian terrestrial sediments in South America are additionally characterized by the miospore index fossil Waltzispora lanzonii. The floral diversity of Tournaisian southern tundra consists almost entirely of relict Devonian genera; this suggests that Late Devonian land plant extinctions in lower latitudes were mostly driven by competition from new tropical species, rather than global environmental pressures.

=== Invertebrates ===
Trilobites experienced their final substantial diversification event in the mid-late Tournaisian, briefly regaining a level of diversity not seen since the Middle Devonian. Almost all new species belonged to the recently evolved family Phillipsiidae, while the few surviving Devonian-type trilobites declined. Most early Tournaisian trilobites were widespread deep-water species. By the late Tournaisian, they had recolonized shallower environments and divided into three different biogeographic zones corresponding to North America, Europe, and East Asia.

== Notable formations ==
- Albert Formation (New Brunswick, Canada)
- Agua de Lucho Formation (Argentina)
- Ballagan Formation / Cementstone Group (Scotland)
- Herbesskaya Formation (Russia)
- Horton Bluff Formation (Nova Scotia, Canada)
- Mansfield Group (Australia)
- Price Formation (West Virginia / Virginia, United States)
- Tournai Formation (Belgium)
