= Mississippian (geology) =

First subperiod of the Carboniferous Period

- 358.86 ± 0.4 – 323.4 ± 0.19 Ma
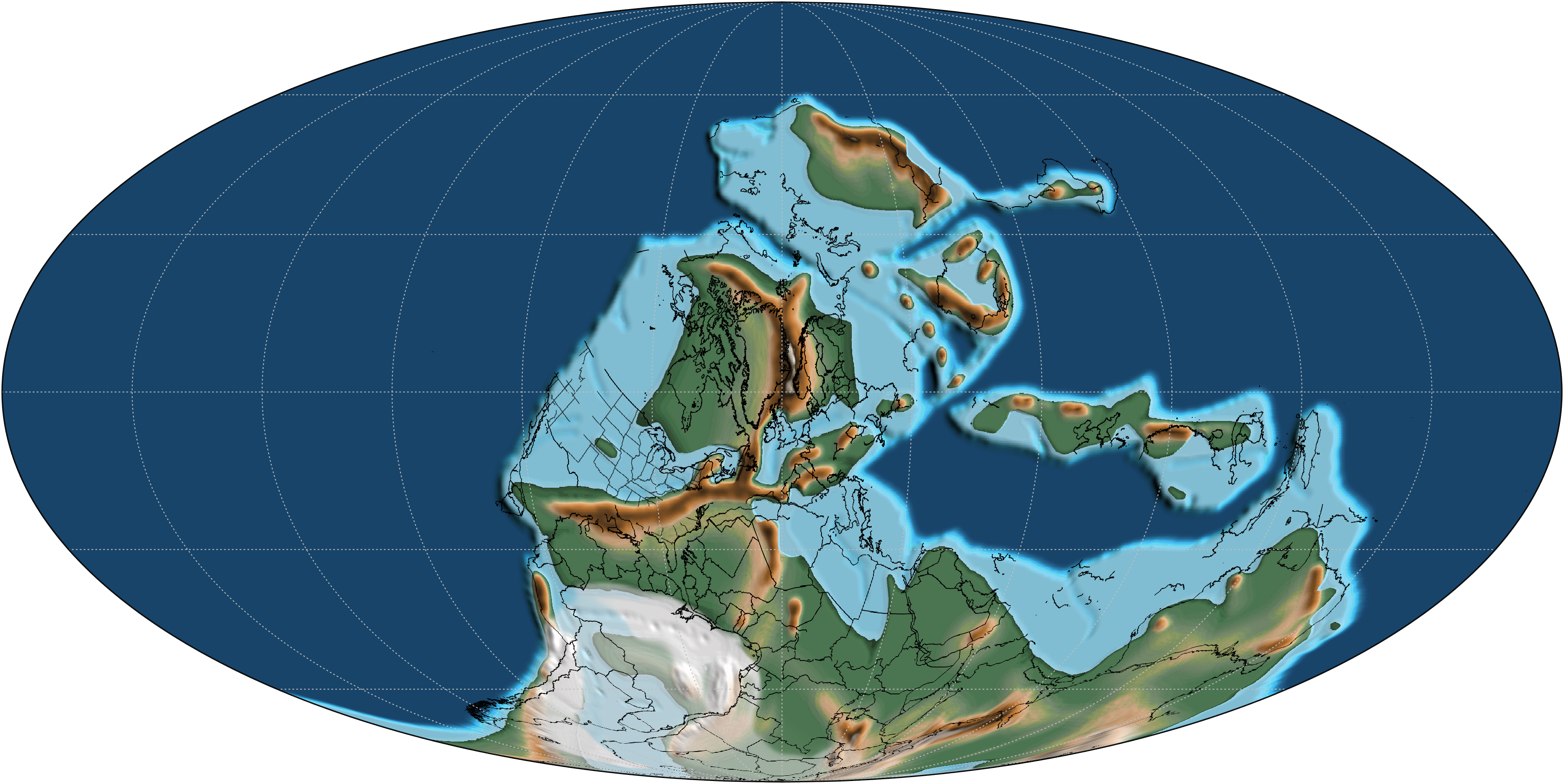
- A map of Earth as it appeared 340 million years ago during the Mississippian Subperiod, Viséan Age

Chronology
← / Carboniferous Rainforest Collapse; ← / Mazon Creek Fossils; ← / End of Romer's Gap; ← / Beginning of Romer's Gap
Subdivision of the Carboniferous according to the ICS, as of 2024. Vertical axis scale: Millions of years ago

Etymology
- Name formality: Formal

Usage information
- Celestial body: Earth
- Regional usage: Global (ICS)
- Time scale(s) used: ICS Time Scale

Definition
- Chronological unit: Subperiod
- Time span formality: Formal
- Lower boundary definition: FAD of the Conodont Siphonodella sulcata (discovered to have biostratigraphic issues as of 2006)
- Lower boundary GSSP: La Serre, Montagne Noire, France; 43.5555°N 3.3573°E
- Lower GSSP ratified: 1990
- Upper boundary definition: FAD of the Conodont Declinognathodus nodiliferus
- Upper boundary GSSP: Arrow Canyon, Nevada, United States; 36.7333°N 114.7778°W
- Upper GSSP ratified: 1996

The Mississippian (/ˌmɪsɪˈsɪpi.ən/ MISS-iss-IP-ee-ən), also known as Lower Carboniferous or Early Carboniferous, is a subperiod in the geologic timescale or a subsystem of the geologic record. It is the earlier of two subperiods of the Carboniferous period lasting from roughly 358.86 to 323.4 million years ago. As with most other geochronologic units, the rock beds that define the Mississippian are well identified, but the exact start and end dates are uncertain by a few million years. The Mississippian is so named because rocks with this age are exposed in the Mississippi Valley.

The Mississippian was a period of marine transgression in the Northern Hemisphere: the sea level was so high that only the Fennoscandian Shield and the Laurentian Shield were dry land. The cratons were surrounded by extensive delta systems and lagoons, and carbonate sedimentation on the surrounding continental platforms, covered by shallow seas.

In North America, where the interval consists primarily of marine limestones, it is treated as a geologic period between the Devonian and the Pennsylvanian. During the Mississippian an important phase of orogeny occurred in the Appalachian Mountains. The United States Geological Survey (USGS) geologic time scale shows its relation to other periods.

In Europe, the Mississippian and Pennsylvanian are grouped together as the Carboniferous system, and traditionally referred to as the Upper Carboniferous and Lower Carboniferous instead.

== Subdivisions ==
In the international geologic timescale, the Mississippian is subdivided into three stages:

- Serpukhovian (330.3 to 323.4 mya)
- Visean (346.7 to 330.3 mya)
- Tournaisian (358.86 to 346.7 mya)

The lower two come from European stratigraphy, the top from Russian stratigraphy. Besides Europe and Russia, there are many local subdivisions that are used as alternatives for the international timescale. In the North American system, the Mississippian is subdivided into four stages:

- Chesterian (top of the Visean plus the Serpukhovian)
- Meramecian (middle Visean)
- Osagean or Osagian (top of the Tournaisian and bottom of the Visean)
- Kinderhookian (the lower two-thirds of the Tournaisian)
