= 1977 in paleontology =

Paleontology or palaeontology is the study of prehistoric life forms on Earth through the examination of plant and animal fossils. This includes the study of body fossils, tracks (ichnites), burrows, cast-off parts, fossilised feces (coprolites), palynomorphs and chemical residues. Because humans have encountered fossils for millennia, paleontology has a long history both before and after becoming formalized as a science. This article records significant discoveries and events related to paleontology that occurred or were published in the year 1977.

== Plants ==
=== Ferns ===
Name	Novelty	Status	Authors	Age	Unit	Location	Synonymized taxa	Notes	Images
Anemia gunni	Sp nov	Valid	Wolfe	Late Eocene	Kulthieth Formation	USA; Alaska		An anemiaceous fern	Anemia gunni
Lygodium larsoni	Sp nov	jr synonym	Wolfe	Late Eocene	Kulthieth Formation	USA; Alaska		A Lygodium species fern. Synonymized with Lygodium kaulfussi.	
Cyathea inequilateralis	Comb nov	valid	(Hollick) Wolfe	Late Eocene	Kulthieth Formation	USA; Alaska	Cyathea pinnata (1952); Hemitelia pinnata (1941)	A Cyathea species tree fern. Moved from Pteris inequilateralis (1936)	Cyathea inequilateralis
Dryopteris alaskana	Comb nov	valid	(Hollick) Wolfe	Late Eocene	Kulthieth Formation	USA; Alaska		A Dryopteris species fern. Moved in part from Asplenium alaskanum (1936); Possibly actually belonging to Thelypteridaceae.	Dryopteris alaskana

=== Conifers ===
Name	Novelty	Status	Authors	Age	Unit	Location	Synonymized taxa	Notes	Images
Pinus peregrinus	Sp nov	Valid	Hickey	Clarkforkian	Golden Valley Formation; Bear Den Member	USA; North Dakota			

=== Angiosperms ===
Name	Novelty	Status	Authors	Age	Type locality	Location	Synonymized taxa	Notes	Images
Alangium bergensis	Sp nov		Wolfe	Late Eocene	Kulthieth Formation	USA; Alaska		A dogwood relative.	
Alangium oregonensis	Sp nov		Wolfe	Eocene	Bridge Creek Flora	USA; Oregon		A dogwood relative.	
Allophylus duktothensis	Sp nov		Wolfe	Late Eocene	Kulthieth Formation	USA; Alaska		A soap berry relative.	
Alnus martini	Sp nov	Valid	Wolfe	Late Eocene	Kulthieth Formation	USA; Alaska		An alder species.	Alnus martini
Anamirta milleri	Sp nov		Wolfe	Late Eocene	Kulthieth Formation	USA; Alaska		A moon seed relative.	Anamirta milleri
Calkinsia dilleri	Comb nov		(Knowlton) Wolfe	Eocene		USA; Oregon		A moon seed relative. Moved from Calkinsia dilleri (1968)	
Calkinsia plafkeri	Sp nov		Wolfe	Late Eocene	Kulthieth Formation	USA; Alaska		A moon seed relative.	Calkinsia plafkeri
Camelia oregona	Comb nov		(Chaney & Sanborn) Wolfe	Eocene; Middle Eocene	Fisher Formation "Goshen flora"	USA; Oregon		A theaceous relative. Moved from Ilex oregona (1933)	
Cinnamomophyllum bendirei	Comb nov		(Knowlton) Wolfe	Eocene	Bridge Creek Flora	USA; Oregon		A lauraceous relative. Moved from Sassafras bendirei (1940)	
Cinnamomophyllum eocernua	Comb nov		(Chaney & Sanborn) Wolfe	Eocene; Middle Eocene	Fisher Formation "Goshen flora"	USA; Oregon		A lauraceous relative. Moved from Octoea eocernua (1933)	
Cinnamomophyllum kushtakensis	Sp nov		Wolfe	Late Eocene	Kulthieth Formation	USA; Alaska		A lauraceous relative.	
Cinnamomophyllum latum	Comb nov		(MacGinitie) Wolfe	Late Eocene	Ione Formation	USA; California		A lauraceous relative. Moved from Litsea lata (1952); First named Neolitsea lata (1941)	Cinnamomophyllum latum
Dicotylophyllum carbonensis	Sp nov		Wolfe	Late Eocene	Kulthieth Formation	USA; Alaska		A "dicot" of unknown affinity.	
Dicotylophyllum kummerensis	Comb nov	jr synonym	(Wolfe) Wolfe	Late Eocene "Upper Ravenian"	Puget Group "below Cashman bed" Loc 9731	USA; Washington		A dicot of uncertain affinity. Moved from Artocarpoides kummerensis 1968. Moved to Republica kummerensis (1987)	
Doona? chaneyi	Comb nov	valid	(Potbury) Wolfe	Latest Eocene-Earliest Oligocene	La Porte Tuff	USA; California		A Shorea (syn "Doona") species. Moved from Rhamnidium chaneyi (1935)	
Dracontomelon sanbornae	Sp nov	valid	Wolfe	Middle Eocene	Fisher Formation "Comstock flora"	USA; Oregon		An anacardiaceous species.	
Euodia alaskana	Sp nov	Valid	Wolfe	Late Eocene	Kulthieth Formation	USA; Alaska		A Euodia species.	
Euptelea orientalis	Comb nov	valid	(Sanborn) Wolfe	Middle Eocene	Fisher Formation "Comstock flora"	USA; Oregon		A eupteleaceous species. Moved from Diospyros orientalis (1935)	
Fagopsis groenlandica	Comb nov	Jr synonym	(Heer) Wolfe	Eocene		Greenland		A fagaceous relative. Moved from Quercophyllum groenlandicus (1963)	
Fagus oregona	Comb nov	Jr synonym	(Chaney & Sanborn) Wolfe	Eocene		USA; Oregon		A fagaceous relative. Moved from Tetracera oregona (1933)	
Fortunearia weedi	Comb nov	valid	(Sanborn) Wolfe	Middle Eocene	Yellowstone Formation	USA; Wyoming		A hamamelidaceous species. Moved from Quercus weedii (1899)	
Goweria alaskana	Sp nov		Wolfe	Late Eocene	Kulthieth Formation	USA; Alaska		An icacinaceous species.	
Heteromeles cuprovallis	Comb nov		(Axelrod) Wolfe	Late Eocene	Copper Basin Flora	USA		An toyon species. Moved from Salix cuprovallis (1966)	
Ilex carbonensis	Sp nov		Wolfe	Late Eocene	Kulthieth Formation	USA; Alaska		A holly species.	
Kandelia wangi	Sp nov		Wolfe	Late Eocene	Kulthieth Formation	USA; Alaska		A mangrove species.	
Limacia stenophylla	Sp nov		Wolfe	Late Eocene	Kulthieth Formation	USA; Alaska		A moon seed relative.	Limacia stenophylla
Litseaphyllum	Gen et Sp et comb nov		Wolfe	Late Eocene	Kulthieth Formation	USA; Alaska		A lauraceous morphogenus. The genus includes L. carbonensis, L. katallaensis L. schorni New combinations moved from Cryptocarya presamarensis (1935), Laurus similis (1900), Magnolia californica (1935), Nectandra presanguinea (1933), Persea praelingue (1935)	
Luvunga spatioea	Comb nov	valid	(Hollick) Wolfe	Late Eocene	Kulthieth Formation	USA; Alaska		A citrus relative. Moved from Persea spatiosa (1936)	
Mastixia irregularis	Comb nov		(Hollick) Wolfe	Late Eocene	Kulthieth Formation	USA; Alaska		A tuplo relative. Moved from Cornus irregularis (1936)	
Melanorrhoea alaskana	Comb nov	Jr synonym	(Hollick) Wolfe	Late Eocene	Kulthieth Formation	USA; Alaska		An anacardioid relative. Moved from Semecarpus alaskana (1936); Recombined as Gluta alaskana.	
Meliosma duktothensis	Sp nov		Wolfe	Late Eocene	Kulthieth Formation	USA; Alaska		A sabiaceous species.	
Miquelia californica	Sp nov		Wolfe	Late Eocene	Ione Formation	USA; California		An icacinaceous species.	
Nelumbo aureavallis	Sp nov	Valid	Hickey	Ypresian	Golden Valley Formation; Camels Butte Member	USA; North Dakota		A water lilly	
Palaeophytocrene elytraeformis	Comb nov		(Hollick) Wolfe	Late Eocene	Kulthieth Formation	USA; Alaska		An icacinaceous species. Moved from Carpolithes elytraeformis (1936)	
Parashorea cashmanensis	Comb nov		(Wolfe) Wolfe	Late Eocene "Upper Ravenian"	Puget Group "below Cashman bed" Loc 9731	USA; Washington		A Parashorea dipterocarpaceous species. Moved from Rhamnites cashmanensis (1968).	
Paratinomiscium	Gen et comb nov		Wolfe	Late Eocene	Kulthieth Formation	USA; Alaska		A moon seed relative. The type species is Hampea conditionalis (1936)	Paratinomiscium conditionalis
Peltandra primaeva	Sp nov	Valid	Hickey	Ypresian	Golden Valley Formation; Camels Butte Member loc. 14048	USA; North Dakota		An arrow arum species.	
Phytocrene acutissima	Sp nov		Wolfe	Late Eocene	Kulthieth Formation	USA; Alaska		An icacinaceous species.	
Plafkeria	Nom et comb nov		Wolfe	Late Eocene	Renton Formation	USA; Washington		A tiliaceous genus. A replacement genus name for "Willisia" Wolfe (1968); The type species is "W." rentonensis. Also includes P. obliquifolia (1925)	
Platanus comstocki	Comb nov	valid	(Sanborn) Wolfe	Middle Eocene	Fisher Formation "Comstock flora"	USA; Oregon		A plane tree species. Moved from Mallotus comstocki (1935)	
Platanus macginitiei	Sp nov		Wolfe	Middle Eocene	Fisher Formation "Goshen flora"	USA; Oregon		A plane tree species. New species for "Platanus aceroides" (Chaney & Sanborn 1933)	
Platycarya pseudobrauni	Comb nov	valid	(Hollick) Wolfe	Late Eocene	Kulthieth Formation	USA; Alaska	Fraxinus lateralis (1936); Planera aquaticiformis (1936)	A Platycarya species. Moved from Ulmus pseudobraunii (1936)	Platycarya pseudobrauni
Porosia	Gen et comb nov		Hickey	Ypresian	Golden Valley Formation; Bear Den Member loc. 14056a	USA; North Dakota		A bur-reed. A new genus for Carpites verrucosa (1878)	
Prunus axelrodi	Comb et nom nov		(Axelrod) Wolfe	Late Eocene	Copper Basin Flora	USA		A cherry/plum species. Moved from Euonymus nevadensis (1966) new specific name given as Prunus nevadensis preoccupied.	
Rubus eolaciniata	Comb nov		(MacGinitie) Tanai & Wolfe	Early - early Middle Miocene	Weaverville Formation	USA; California		A blackberry leaf morphospecies. First named as Ulmus eolaciniate (1937)	
Pterocarya orientalis	Comb nov		(MacGinitie) Wolfe	Late Oligocene		USA; Oregon		A wing nut species. Moved from Juglans orientalis (1937)	
Sageretia laurinea	Comb nov		(Lesquereux) Wolfe	Late Eocene	Kulthieth Formation	USA; Alaska		An icacinaceous species. Moved from Phyllites laurinea (1941)	
Salix carbonensis	Sp nov	Valid	Wolfe	Late Eocene	Kulthieth Formation	USA; Alaska		A willow species.	
Salix coatsi	Comb nov		(Axelrod) Wolfe	Late Eocene	Copper Basin Flora	USA		A willow species. Moved from Lithocarpus coatsi (1966)	
Sorbus carbonensis	Sp nov	Valid	Wolfe	Late Eocene	Kulthieth Formation	USA; Alaska		A mountain ash species.	
Sparganium parvum	Sp nov		Hickey	Ypresian	Golden Valley Formation; Bear Den Member loc. 14056a	USA; North Dakota		A bur-reed	
Stemonurus alaskanus	Sp nov		Wolfe	Late Eocene	Kulthieth Formation	USA; Alaska		A stemonuraceous species.	
Tetracentron piperoides	Comb nov	Valid?	(Lesquereux) Wolfe	Late Eocene	Ione Formation	USA; California	synonymy: Ceanothus idahoensis (1935); Cercidiphyllum elongatum (1939); Populus smilacifolia (1920); Populus zaddachi (1878); Trochodendroides zaddacki (1935); Zizyphus californica (1919); Zizyphus microphyUus (Lesquereux) (1878)	A Tetracentron species. Moved from Cercidiphyllum piperoides (1952)	Tetracentron piperoides
Tilia carbonensis	Sp nov		Wolfe	Late Eocene	Kulthieth Formation	USA; Alaska		A tiliaceous species.	
Ulmus chaneyi	Sp nov	valid	Tanai & Wolfe	Eocene; Rupelian	John Day Formation; Bridge Creek Flora	USA; Oregon		An Elm leaf morphospecies.	
Ulmus knowltoni	Sp nov	valid	Tanai & Wolfe	Miocene	"Collawash Flora"	USA; Oregon		An Elm leaf morphospecies.	
Zelkova browni	Sp nov	valid	Tanai & Wolfe	Miocene	"Collawash Flora"	USA; Oregon	synonymy: Zelkova oregoniana non (Knowlton) Brown nec Brown, 1937; Zelkova ungeri non Kovats nec Becker, 1969; Fagopsis longifolia non (Lesquereux) Hollick nec Berry, 1929; Quercus mccanni non Berry nec Axelrod, 1964; ?Ulmus fernquisti 1926; ?Zelkova nevadensis 1956	An Elm leaf morphospecies.	
Zizyphus alaskanus	Sp nov		Wolfe	Late Eocene	Kulthieth Formation	USA; Alaska		A buckthorn relative.	

== Invertebrates ==
=== Mollusks ===
Name	Novelty	Status	Authors	Age	Type locality	Location	Notes	Images
Fordilla sibirica	sp nov	jr synonym	Krasilova	Early Cambrian	Tyuser Formation	Russia	An early bivalve species. Synonym of Fordilla troyensis.	

== Conodonts ==
Name	Novelty	Status	Authors	Age	Type locality	Location	Notes	Images
Vjalovognathus	Nom et comb nov	valid	Kozur					

== Fish ==
Name	Novelty	Status	Authors	Age	Type locality	Location	Notes	Images
Amyzon aggregatum	Sp nov	Valid	Wilson	Eocene; Ypresian	Okanagan Highlands; Horsefly Shales	Canada; British Columbia	An Amyzon species catostomid	
Eosalmo	Gen et sp nov	Valid	Wilson	Eocene; Ypresian	Okanagan Highlands; Driftwood Shales	Canada; British Columbia	A basal salmonid relative. The type species is E. driftwoodensis	Eosalmo driftwoodensis
Libotonius	Gen et sp nov	Valid	Wilson	Eocene; Ypresian	Okanagan Highlands; Allenby Formation	Canada; British Columbia	A libotoniid sand roller relative. The type species is L. blakeburnensis	
Priscacara aquilonia	Sp nov	Valid	Wilson	Eocene; Ypresian	Okanagan Highlands; Horsefly Shales	Canada; British Columbia	A Priscacara species temperate bass.	

== Archosauriformes ==
=== Non-avian dinosaurs ===
Data courtesy of George Olshevsky's dinosaur genera list.

Name	Novelty	Status	Authors	Age	Type locality	Location	Notes	Images
Fulengia	Gen et sp nov	Nomen dubium	Carroll & Galton	Early Jurassic	Lufeng Formation	China	Possible synonym of Lufengosaurus.	
Opisthocoelicaudia	Gen et sp Nov	Valid	Borsuk-Bialynicka	Late Cretaceous; Maastrichtian	Nemegt Formation	Mongolia	A saltasaurid Titanosaur.	Opisthocoelicaudia skarzynskii
Othnielia	Gen et comb nov	jr synonym	Galton	Late Jurassic (Kimmeridgian - Tithonian)	Morrison Formation	USA (Colorado)	JR synonym of Nanosaurus agilis.	Nanosaurus agilis
Piveteausaurus	Gen et comb nov	Valid	Taquet & Welles	Middle Jurassic (Callovian)	Marnes de Dives Formation	France	A Megalosaur. Moved from Eustreptospondylus divesensis (1964)	Piveteausaurus divesensis
Saichania	Gen et sp nov	Valid	Maryańska	Late Cretaceous (Maastrichtian)	Barun Goyot Formation	Mongolia	An ankylosaurine ankylosaurid	Saichania chulsanensis
"Shanshanosaurus"	Gen et sp nov	Jr synonym	Zhiming	Late Cretaceous (Campanian - Maastrichtian	Subashi Formation	China	A theropod. The type species is S. huoyanshanensis. Junior synonym of Tarbosaurus bataar.	Tarbosaurus bataar
Tarchia	Gen et sp nov	Valid	Maryańska	Late Cretaceous (Maastrichtian)	Barun Goyot Formation	Mongolia	An ankylosaurine ankylosaurid	Tarchia kielanae
Tuojiangosaurus	Gen et sp nov	Valid	Dong et al	Late jurassic Oxfordian - Kimmeridgian	Shangshaximiao Formation	China	A Chinese Stegosaur.	Tuojiangosaurus multispinus
Valdosaurus	Gen et comb nov	Valid	Galton	Early Cretaceous (Berriasian - Barremian)	Wessex Formation	UK; Isle of Wight	A Dryosaur. moved from Dryosaurus canaliculatus (1975)	Valdosaurus canaliculatus
Wannanosaurus		Valid taxon	Hou			China	A Primitive Pachycephalosaur	Wannanosaurus
"Yezosaurus"	not formally described	Nomen nudum.	Obata & Muramoto				A Non-dinosaurian marine reptile. Type species "Y." mikasaensis	Taniwhasaurus

=== Birds ===
Name	Novelty	Status	Authors	Age	Unit	Location	Notes	Images
Argillipes	Gen et sp nov.	Valid	Harrison & Walker	Early Eocene		UK	Described as a phasianid. The type species is A. aurorum & includes A. paralectoris Considered Aves Incertae Sedis by Mlíkovský (2002)	
Buthierax	Gen et sp nov.	Valid	Kretzoi	Middle Pleistocene		Greece	An Incertae Sedis Accipitridae; The type species is B. pouliani	
Cepphus storeri	Sp. nov.	Valid	Harrison	Late Pliocene		UK	An Alcidae guillemot.	
Ciconia sarmatica	Sp. nov.	Valid	Grigorescu & Kessler	Early Miocene; Sarmatian		Romania	A Ciconiidae.	
Cinclodes major	Sp. nov.	Valid	Tonni	Middle Pleistocene		Argentina	A Furnariidae.	
Coturnipes	Gen et sp nov.	Valid	Harrison & Walker	Early Eocene		UK	Described as a phasianid The type species is C. cooperi Considered "Aves Incertae Sedis" by Olson, 1999	
Gallus beremendensis	Sp. nov.	Valid	Jánossy	Late Pliocene		Hungary	A Phasianidae.	
Limnofregata	Subfam, gen et sp nov.	Valid	Olson	Early Eocene	Green River Formation; Fossil Butte Member	USA (Wyoming)	A Limnofregatinae frigatebird. The type species L. azygosternon	Limnofregata azygosternon
Malacorhynchus scarletti	Sp. nov.	Valid	Olson	Holocene		New Zealand	An Anatidae.	
Marinavis	Fam, gen et sp nov.	Valid	Harrison & Walker	Early Eocene		UK	Described as a marinavid procelariiforme The type species is M. longirostris	
Microena	Gen et sp nov.	Valid	Harrison & Walker	Early Eocene		UK	Described in the Columbidae; The type species is M. goodwini. Considered as "Aves Inceretae Sedis" by Mlíkovský 2002, Possibly a "Coraciiformes" or "Caprimulgiformes"/Apodiformes, per Mayr, 2009.	
Neptuniavis	Gen et sp. nov.	Valid	Harrison & Walker	Early Eocene		UK	A possible Procellariidae; The type species is N. miranda and includes N. minor Possibly a synonym of Dasornis.	
Oxyura zapatanima	Sp. nov.	Valid	Alvarez	Late Pliocene-Early Pleistocene	Jocotopec sand and gravel Quarry	Mexico	An Anatidae.	
Parvicuculus	Gen et sp nov.	Valid	Harrison & Walker	Early Eocene		UK	A Parvicuculidae; THe type species is P. minor	
Parvigyps	Gen et sp nov.	Valid	Harrison & Walker	Early Eocene		UK	Described as a Accipitridae; The type species is P. praecox Considered "Aves Incertae Sedis" by Mlíkovský (2002)	
Percolinus	Gen et sp nov.	jr synonym	Harrison & Walker	Early Eocene		UK	Described as a Phasianidae; The type species is P. venablesi a jr synonym of Gypsornis (2002),	
Phalacrocorax chapalensis	Sp. nov.	Valid	Alvarez	Late Pliocene-Early Pleistocene	Jocotopec sand and gravel quarry	Mexico	A Phalacrocoracidae.	
Pinguinus alfrednewtoni	Sp. nov.	Valid	Olson	Early Pliocene	Chesapeake Group	USA (Maryland)	An Alcidae.	Pinguinus alfrednewtoni
Precursor	Sp. nov.	Valid	Harrison & Walker	Early Eocene		UK	A glareolid The type species is P. parvus Other species are P. litorum and P. magnus.	
Primodroma	Gen et sp nov.	Valid	Harrison & Walker	Early Eocene		UK	A Hydrobatidae; The type species is P. bournei.	
Primoscens	Fam, gen et sp nov.	Valid	Harrison & Walker	Early Eocene		UK	A "Primoscenidae" passeriform, The type species is P. minutus Moved to Zygodactylidae (2008),	
Procuculus	Gen et sp nov.	Valid	Harrison & Walker	Early Eocene		UK	A Parvicuculidae; The type species is P. minutus Olson (1985) & Mayr, (2009) suggest possible synonymy with Primapus lacki.	
Quipollornis	Gen et sp nov.	Valid	Vickers Rich & McEvey	Early to Middle Miocene	Chalk Mountain Diatomite	Australia	An Aegothelidae; The type species is Q. koniberi.	
Rallus richmondi	Nom. nov.	Valid	Olson	Late Miocene		Italy	A rail a new name for Rallus dubius Portis (1887), junior homonym of Rallus dubius Piller & Mitterpacher (1783).	
Sarmatosula	Gen et sp nov.	Valid	Grigorescu & Kessler	Middle Miocene; Sarmatian		Romania	A Sulidae; The type species is S. dobrogensis	
Shandongornis	Gen et sp nov.	Valid	Yeh	Middle Miocene	Shanwang Series	China	A Phasianidae; The type species is S. shanwanensis.	Shandongornis
Xenicibis	Gen et sp nov.	Valid	Olson & Steadman	Quaternary	Cave deposits	Jamaica	A Threskiornithidae; The type species is X. xympithecus.	

=== Pterosaurs ===
Name	Novelty	Status	Authors	Age	Type locality	Location	Notes	Images
Araripedactylus	Gen et sp nov	Valid	Wellnhofer	late Aptian/early Albian	Santana Formation	Brazil	A pterodactyloid of uncertain affinities. The type species is A. dehmi	

== Expeditions, field work, and fossil discoveries ==
- David Trexler found hadrosaur remains west of Choteau, Montana in strata of the Two Medicine Formation.

== Popular culture ==
=== Literature ===
- The Year of the Dinosaur Edwin H. Colbert and illustrated by his wife, Margaret was published. This story describes a year in the life of a "brontosaur" and was an attempt to educate the reader about prehistory through a fictional portrayal of it.
