= 1936 in paleontology =

List of years in paleontology	(table)
- … 1926; 1927; 1928; 1929; 1930; 1931; 1932; 1933; 1934; 1935; 1936; 1937; 1938; 1939; 1940; 1941; 1942; 1943; 1944; 1945; 1946 …
- In science 1933 1934 1935 1936 1937 1938 1939
- Art; Archaeology; Architecture; Literature; Music; Philosophy; Science; +...

Paleontology or palaeontology is the study of prehistoric life forms on Earth through the examination of plant and animal fossils. This includes the study of body fossils, tracks (ichnites), burrows, cast-off parts, fossilised feces (coprolites), palynomorphs and chemical residues. Because humans have encountered fossils for millennia, paleontology has a long history both before and after becoming formalized as a science. This article records significant discoveries and events related to paleontology that occurred or were published in the year 1936.

== Plants ==
=== Ferns and fern allies ===
Name	Novelty	Status	Authors	Age	Unit	Location	Synonymized taxa	Notes	Images
Asplenium alaskanum	Sp nov	Jr synonym	Hollick	Late Eocene	Kulthieth Formation	USA; Alaska		First described as a Dennstaedtia species. Moved in part to Dryopteris alaskana in 1977	Dryopteris alaskana
Dennstaedtia blomstrandi	Comb nov	valid	(Heer) Hollick	Eocene	Ny-Ålesund suite	Norway		A Dennstaedtia species. Moved from Sphenopteris blomstrandii (1868)	
Dryopteris meyeri	Comb nov	Isonym	(Heer) Hollick	Miocene; Tortonian	Öhningen	Germany; Baden-Württemberg		A Thelypteris species. Moved from Aspidium hamiltonensis (1854); Move isonymic to move by Jablonszky (1914); Moved to Thelypteris meyeri in 1968	
Hausmannia atwoodi	Sp nov	jr synonym	Hollick	Paleocene/Eocene	"Herendeen Bay flora"	USA; Alaska		A nymphaeaceous Castaliites species. Moved to Castaliites atwoodii in 1976	
Osmunda dubiosa	Sp nov	Jr synonym	Hollick	Paleocene/Eocene	"Cape Douglas flora"	USA; Alaska		First described as an Osmunda species. Moved to Cladophlebis dubiosa in 1983; Moved to Osmundastrum dubiosum in 1988	
Pteris inequilateralis	Sp nov	Jr synonym	Hollick	Late Eocene	Kulthieth Formation	USA; Alaska		First described as a Pteris species. Moved in part to Cyathea inequilateralis in 1977	Cyathea inequilateralis

=== Cycadophytes ===
Name	Novelty	Status	Authors	Age	Unit	Location	Synonymized taxa	Notes	Images
Anthrophyopsis hamiltonensis	Sp nov	jr synonym	Hollick	Paleocene/Eocene	"Hamilton Bay flora"	United States; Alaska		A Ctenis species. Moved to Ctenis hamiltonensis (1952)	

=== Ginkgophytes ===
Name	Novelty	Status	Authors	Age	Unit	Location	Synonymized taxa	Notes	Images
Ginkgo reniformis conformis	Subsp nov		Hollick	Paleocene/Eocene	"Chinitna Bay flora"	United States; Alaska		A Ginkgo subspecies.	

=== Conifers ===
==== Cupressaceae ====
Name	Novelty	Status	Authors	Age	Unit	Location	Synonymized taxa	Notes	Images
Taxodium crassum	Sp nov	jr synonym	Hollick	Paleocene/Eocene	"Hamilton Bay flora"	United States; Alaska		Named as a Taxodium species. Synonymized in part with Taxodium dubium, in part with Metasequoia occidentalis (1951)	

=== Flowering plants ===
==== Magnoliids ====
Name	Novelty	Status	Authors	Age	Unit	Location	Synonymized taxa	Notes	Images
Cinnamomum cinnamomeum	Comb nov		(Rossmässler) Hollick	Tortonian	Öhningen	Germany; Baden-Württemberg	synonymy: Camphora polymorpha (1855?) pro parte; Ceanothus polymorphus (1845); Cinnamomum polymorphum (1856); Daphnogene cinnamomeifolia (1845); Daphnogene polymorpha (1851); Laurus cinnamomiformis (1840) nomen nudum; Phyllites cinnamomeifolia (1828) nomen nudum?; Phyllites cinnamomiformis (1828) nomen nudum; Phyllites cinnamomeus (1840); Rhamnus terminalis (1836) nomen nudum	A cinnamon relative	
Cinnamomum ficoides	Sp nov		Hollick	Paleocene/Eocene	"Russel Creek Flora"	USA; Alaska		A cinnamon relative	
Laurus hamiltonensis	Sp nov		Hollick	Paleocene/Eocene	"Hamilton Bay flora"	USA; Alaska		A laurel relative	
Malapoenna magnifica	Comb nov	jr homonym	(Saporta) Hollick	Oligocene; Chattian		France		Combination a jr homonym of Malapoenna magnifica (Kuntze, 1891); First described as Litsea magnifica (1865); Moved back to Litsea magnifica in (?1952); Moved to Neolitsea magnifica in (1975)	
Persea spatiosa	Sp nov	jr synonym	Hollick	Late Eocene	Kulthieth Formation	USA; Alaska		First described as an avocado relative Moved to Luvunga spatioea in 1977.	
Piper chapini	Sp nov		Hollick	Paleocene/Eocene	Matanuska coal field	USA; Alaska		A pepper family species	
Piper concavum	Sp nov		Hollick	Paleocene/Eocene	"Grade Trail cabin flora"	USA; Alaska		A pepper family species	
Piper convertabilis	Sp nov		Hollick	Paleocene/Eocene	Matanuska coal field	USA; Alaska		A pepper family species	
Piper disputabilis	Sp nov		Hollick	Paleocene/Eocene	"Canyon Creek flora"	USA; Alaska		A pepper family species	
Piper septentrionalis	Sp nov		Hollick	Paleocene/Eocene	"Chignik Lake flora"	USA; Alaska		A pepper family species	
Sassafras alaskanum	Sp nov		Hollick	Paleocene/Eocene	"Hamilton Bay flora"	USA; Alaska		A Sassafras relative	

==== Monocots ====
Name	Novelty	Status	Authors	Age	Unit	Location	Synonymized taxa	Notes	Images
Flabellaria alaskana	Sp nov	jr synonym	Hollick	Paleocene/Eocene	Matanuska coal field	USA; Alaska		A Palmacites morphospecies. Moved to Exflabellaria alaskana in 1952; Moved to Palmacites alaskana	

==== Basal Eudicots and unplaced core Eudicots ====
Name	Novelty	Status	Authors	Age	Unit	Location	Synonymized taxa	Notes	Images
Dillenia alaskana	Sp nov		Hollick	Paleocene/Eocene	"Chiguik River flora"	USA; Alaska		A Dillenia species.	
Dillenites ceterus	Sp nov		Hollick	Paleocene/Eocene	"Hamilton Bay flora"	USA; Alaska		A Dillenia species.	
Dillenites ellipticus	Sp nov		Hollick	Paleocene/Eocene	"Hamilton Bay flora"	USA; Alaska		A Dillenia species. Includes one variety D. e. ulmifolius	
Grevillea alaskana	Sp nov		Hollick	Paleocene/Eocene	"Troublesome Gulch flora"	USA; Alaska		A Grevillea species.	
Hakea alaskana	Sp nov		Hollick	Paleocene/Eocene	Matanuska coal field	USA; Alaska		A Hakea species.	
Macclintockia chignikensis	Sp nov	jr synonym	Hollick	Paleocene/Eocene	"Chignik River flora"	USA; Alaska		First described as a Macclintockia species. Synonymized into Cercidiphyllum arcticum in 1939	
Platanus rectinervis	Sp nov		Hollick	Paleocene/Eocene	"Rampart flora"	USA; Alaska		A Platanus species.	

==== Superasterids ====
Name	Novelty	Status	Authors	Age	Unit	Location	Synonymized taxa	Notes	Images
Aralia delicatula	Sp nov		Hollick	Paleocene/Eocene	"Point Divide flora"	USA; Alaska		An Aralia species.	
Coccolobis chapini	Sp nov	jr synonym	Hollick	Paleocene/Eocene	Matanuska coal field	USA; Alaska		A Coccoloba species. Moved to Coccoloba chapini in 1952	
Cornus irregularis	Sp nov		Hollick	Paleocene/Eocene	"Mount Chezum flora"	USA; Alaska		A dogwood species.	
Fraxinus inordinata	Sp nov		Hollick	Paleocene/Eocene	"Chignik Bay flora"	USA; Alaska		An ash species.	
Fraxinus lateralis	Sp nov	jr synonym	Hollick	Late Eocene	Kulthieth Formation	USA; Alaska		First described as an ash species. Synonymized into Platycarya pseudobrauni in 1977	
Fraxinus? pseudobliqua	Sp nov		Hollick	Paleocene/Eocene	"Chignik Bay flora"	USA; Alaska		A possible ash species.	
Fraxinus yukonensis	Sp nov		Hollick	Paleocene/Eocene	"Mogul Creek flora"	USA; Alaska		An ash species.	
Mohrodendron inopinum	Sp nov	jr synonym	Hollick	Late Eocene	Kulthieth Formation	USA; Alaska		First described as a Mohrodendron species Moved to Halesia inopinum in 1952	
Rhododendron crassum	Sp nov	jr homonym	Hollick	Late Eocene	Kulthieth Formation	USA; Alaska		A rhododendron species. A jr homonym of Rhododendron crassum (Franch, 1887)	
Saurauia alaskana	Sp nov		Hollick	Paleocene/Eocene	"Hamilton Bay Flora"	USA; Alaska		A kiwi relative.	
Viburnum aequale	Sp nov	Valid	Hollick	Paleocene/Eocene	"Point Divide flora"	USA; Alaska		A viburnum species.	
Viburnum duriusculum	Sp nov	Valid	Hollick	Paleocene/Eocene	"Point Divide flora"	USA; Alaska		A viburnum species.	
Viburnum evexum	Sp nov	Valid	Hollick	Paleocene/Eocene	"Chignik Bay flora"	USA; Alaska		A viburnum species.	
Viburnum obliquum	Sp nov	Valid	Hollick	Paleocene/Eocene	Matanuska coal field	USA; Alaska		A viburnum species.	

==== Superrosids ====
Name	Novelty	Status	Authors	Age	Unit	Location	Synonymized taxa	Notes	Images
Abutilon eakini	Sp nov	jr synonym	Hollick	Paleocene/Eocene	"Point Divide flora"	USA; Alaska		First described as an Abutilon species. Moved to Cocculus eakinii in 1983	
Acacia aquilonia	Sp nov		Hollick	Paleocene/Eocene	"Kootznahoo Inlet flora"	USA; Alaska		An Acacia species.	
Acer disputabilis	Sp nov		Hollick	Paleocene/Eocene	"Pumicestone Creek flora"	USA; Alaska		A maple species.	
Acer visibilis	Sp nov		Hollick	Paleocene/Eocene	"Rampart flora"	USA; Alaska		A maple species.	
Alnus alnifolia	Comb nov		(Göppert) Hollick	Tortonian		Poland; Upper Silesia		An alder species. First described as Carpinus alnifolia (1855)	
Artocarpidium alaskanum	Comb nov		Hollick	Late Eocene	Kulthieth Formation	USA; Alaska		A moraceous species.	
Artocarpus ordinarius	Sp nov		Hollick	Paleocene/Eocene	"Rampart flora"	USA; Alaska		A jackfruit relative.	
Betula confusa var. lata	Var nov		Hollick	Paleocene/Eocene	"Bluff Point flora"	USA; Alaska		A Betula confusa variety.	
Betula dubiosa	Sp nom nov		Hollick	Tortonian		Poland; Upper Silesia		A birch species. A new name for Betula macrophylla (Goeppert) (1868); Homonym of Betula macrophylla (Ettingshausen) (1852); First described as Alnus macrophylla (1855)	
Betula populoides	Sp nov		Hollick	Paleocene/Eocene	"Chignik River flora"	USA; Alaska		A birch species.	
Carpinites truncatus	Sp nov		Hollick	Paleocene/Eocene	Nenana coal field	USA; Alaska		A Carpinites betulaceous leaf morphospecies.	
Celastrus comparabilis	Sp nov		Hollick	Paleocene/Eocene	"Dalton's coal outcrop flora"	USA; Alaska		A staff vine species.	
Cissus cissoides	Comb nov		Hollick	Paleocene; Thanetian		France; Marne	Cissus primaeva (1868)	A grapevine species. Moved from Vitigene cissoides (1865)	
Cissus pterospermoides	Sp nov		Hollick	Paleocene/Eocene	"Dalton's coal outcrop flora"	USA; Alaska		A staff vine species.	
Corylus adumbrata	Sp nov		Hollick	Paleocene/Eocene	Matanuska coal field	USA; Alaska		A hazelnut species.	
Corylus evidens	Sp nov		Hollick	Paleocene/Eocene	"Cape Nukhshak flora"	USA; Alaska		A hazelnut species.	
Corylus kenaiana	Sp nov		Hollick	Paleocene/Eocene	"Kachemak Bay flora"	USA; Alaska	Corylus macquarrii (of Heer, 1869 pro parte)	A hazelnut species.	
Crataegus alaskensis	Sp nov		Hollick	Paleocene/Eocene	"Cape Douglas flora"	USA; Alaska		A hawthorn species.	
Crataegus cappsii	Sp nov		Hollick	Paleocene/Eocene	Nenana coal field	USA; Alaska		A hawthorn species.	
Crataegus yukonensis	Sp nov		Hollick	Paleocene/Eocene	"Drew's mine flora"	USA; Alaska		A hawthorn species.	
Cupania comparabilis	Sp nov		Hollick	Paleocene/Eocene	"Cape Nukhshak flora"	USA; Alaska		A Cupania species.	
Dolichos convexus	Sp nov		Hollick	Paleocene/Eocene	Matanuska coal field	USA; Alaska		A Dolichos species.	
Dryophyllum aquilonium	Sp nov		Hollick	Paleocene/Eocene	Matanuska coal field	USA; Alaska		A Dryophyllum species.	
Elaeocarpus alaskensis	Sp nov		Hollick	Paleocene/Eocene	"Bluff Point flora"	USA; Alaska		An Elaeocarpus species.	
Euonymus pacificus	Sp nov		Brown	Miocene	Mascall Formation	USA; Washington		A strawberry bush species.	
Fagus alnitifolia	Sp nov		Hollick	Paleocene/Eocene	"Troublesome Gulch flora"	USA; Alaska		A beech species.	
Ficus menzeli	Sp nov		Hollick	Paleocene/Eocene	Matanuska coal field	USA; Alaska		A fig species.	
Ficus overbecki	Sp nov		Hollick	Paleocene/Eocene	Nenana coal field	USA; Alaska		A fig species.	
Ficus stantoni	Sp nov		Hollick	Paleocene/Eocene	"Chignik Bay flora"	USA; Alaska		A fig species.	
Grewia orbiculata	Sp nov	jr homonym	Hollick	Paleocene/Eocene	"Rampart flora"	USA; Alaska		A Grewia species. jr homonym of Grewia orbiculata (Rottler, 1803)	
Grewia zizyphoides	Sp nov		Hollick	Paleocene/Eocene	"Nun point flora"	USA; Alaska		A Grewia species.	
Grewiopsis alaskana	Sp nov	jr synonym	Hollick	Paleocene/Eocene	"Chignik Bay flora"	USA; Alaska		First described as a Grewiopsis species. Moved to Dicotylophyllum alaskanum in 1966)	
Grewiopsis congerminalis	Sp nov	jr synonym	Hollick	Paleocene/Eocene	"Mogul Creek flora"	USA; Alaska		First described as a Grewiopsis species. Moved to Cordia congerminalis in 1984)	
Grewiopsis defectivus	Sp nov		Hollick	Paleocene/Eocene	"Hamilton Bay flora"	USA; Alaska		A Grewiopsis species.	
Grewiopsis frustratorius	Sp nov		Hollick	Paleocene/Eocene		USA; Alaska		A Grewiopsis species.	
Grewiopsis grandiculus	Sp nov		Hollick	Paleocene/Eocene	"Nun point flora"	USA; Alaska		A Grewiopsis species.	
Hamamelis clarus	Sp nov		Hollick	Paleocene/Eocene	"Mogul Creek flora"	USA; Alaska		A witch-hazel species.	
Hampea conditionalis	Sp nov	jr synonym	Hollick	Paleocene/Eocene	"Dalton's coal flora"	USA; Alaska		First described as a Hampea species. Moved to Paratinomiscium conditionalis in 1977	Paratinomiscium conditionalis
Juglans longiapiculata	Sp nov		Hollick	Paleocene/Eocene	"Hamilton Bay flora"	USA; Alaska		A walnut species.	
Juglans? pseudopunctata	Sp nov		Hollick	Paleocene/Eocene	"Fritz Creek flora"	USA; Alaska		A possible walnut species.	
Juglans valida	Sp nov		Hollick	Paleocene/Eocene	"Hamilton Bay flora"	USA; Alaska		A walnut species.	
Koelreuteria eakini	Sp nov		Hollick	Paleocene/Eocene	"Rampart flora"	USA; Alaska		A Paullinia species.	
Lepargyraea weaveri	Sp nov	jr synonym	(Hollick) LaMotte	Paleocene - Eocene	"Kachemak Bay flora"	USA; Alaska		First described as a Lepargyraea species Moved to Shepherdia weaveri in (1952)	
Myrica banksiaefolia curta	Var nov		Hollick	Paleocene/Eocene	"Cape Douglas flora"	USA; Alaska		A wax-myrtle variety.	
Paliurus ceterus	Sp nov		Hollick	Paleocene/Eocene	Matanuska coal field	USA; Alaska		A Paliurus species.	
Paullinia alaskana	Sp nov		Hollick	Paleocene/Eocene	"Drew's mine flora"	USA; Alaska		A Paullinia species.	
Pithecollobium ceterum	Sp nov		Hollick	Paleocene/Eocene	"Drew mine flora"	USA; Alaska		A blackbead species.	
Planera aquaticiformis	Sp nov	jr synonym	Hollick	Late Eocene	Kulthieth Formation	USA; Alaska		First described as a water elm species. Synonymized with Platycarya pseudobrauni in 1977	
Populus congerminalis	Sp nov		Hollick	Paleocene/Eocene	"Cape Nukhshak flora"	USA; Alaska		A cottonwood species.	
Populus flexuosa	Sp nov	jr synonym	Hollick	Paleocene/Eocene	"Admiralty Island flora"	USA; Alaska		Described as a Populus species. synonymized into Cercidlphyllum arcticum in 1939	
Populus obscura	Sp nov	jr synonym	Hollick	Paleocene/Eocene	"Chignik River flora"	USA; Alaska		Described as a Populus species. synonymized into Cercidlphyllum arcticum in 1939	
Prunus hartungi var. aequalis	Var nov		Hollick	Paleocene/Eocene	" Bluff Point flora"	USA; Alaska		A cherry variety.	
Pterocarya septentrionale	Sp nov		Hollick	Paleocene/Eocene	"Moose Creek flora"	USA; Alaska		A wingnut species.	
Pterospermites auriculaecordatus	Sp nov		Hollick	Paleocene/Eocene	"Moose Creek flora"	USA; Alaska		First described as a Pterospermites species. Moved to Grewiopsis auriculicordatus in 1966	
Pterospermites conjunctivus	Sp nov		Hollick	Paleocene/Eocene	"Chignik Bay flora"	USA; Alaska		A Pterospermites species.	
Pterospermites imparilis	Sp nov		Hollick	Paleocene/Eocene	"Moose Creek flora"	USA; Alaska		A Pterospermites species.	
Quercus conjunctiva	Sp nov		Hollick	Paleocene/Eocene	Matanuska coal field	USA; Alaska		A oak species.	
Rhamnus pseudogoldianus	Sp nov		Hollick	Paleocene/Eocene	"Rampart flora"	USA; Alaska		A buckthorn species.	
Rosa cetera	Sp nov		Hollick	Paleocene/Eocene	Matanuska coal field	USA; Alaska		A rose species.	
Rosa confirmata	Sp nov		Hollick	Paleocene/Eocene	"Bluff Point flora"	USA; Alaska		A rose species.	
Salix alaskana	Sp nov		Hollick	Paleocene/Eocene	"Bradley Coal flora"	USA; Alaska		A willow species.	
Semecarpus alaskana	Sp nov	jr synonym	Hollick	Late Eocene	Kulthieth Formation	USA; Alaska		First described as a Semecarpus species. Moved to Melanorrhoea alaskana in 1977; Recombined as Gluta alaskana.	
Semecarpus prindlei	Sp nov		Hollick	Paleocene/Eocene	"Bryant Creek flora"	USA; Alaska		A Semecarpus species.	
Sophora multiformis	Sp nov		Hollick	Paleocene/Eocene	"Drew's mine flora"	USA; Alaska		A Sophora species.	
Spiraea weaveri	Sp nov		Hollick	Paleocene/Eocene	"Fritz Creek flora"	USA; Alaska		A bridal wreath species.	
Tilia grewioides	Sp nov		Hollick	Paleocene/Eocene	"Kootznahoo Inlet flora"	USA; Alaska		A Tilia species.	
Tilia notabilis	Sp nov		Hollick	Paleocene/Eocene	"Kootznahoo Inlet flora"	USA; Alaska		A Tilia species.	
Ulmus pseudobraunii	Sp nov	jr synonym	Hollick	Late Eocene	Kulthieth Formation	USA; Alaska		First described as an elm species. Moved to Platycarya pseudobrauni in 1977	Platycarya pseudobrauni
Vitis atwoodi	Sp nov		Hollick	Paleocene/Eocene	"Kootznahoo inlet flora"	USA; Alaska		A grape species.	

=== Other flowering plants ===
Name	Novelty	Status	Authors	Age	Unit	Location	Synonymized taxa	Notes	Images
Antholithes castaneoides	Sp nov	Valid	Hollick	Paleocene/Eocene	"Moose Creek flora"	USA; Alaska		Stellate inflorescences of uncertain affinity Similar to Quercus, Fagus, & Castanea; Placed in form genus Antholites	
Carpolithes auriformis	Sp nov	jr synonym	Hollick	Paleocene/Eocene	"King Salmon Lake flora"	USA; Alaska		A fruit of initial uncertain affinity First placed in form genus Carpolithes; Moved to Diploclisia auriformis in 1994; Moved to Stephania auriformis in 2017	
Carpolithes elytraeformis	Sp nov	jr synonym	Hollick	Late Eocene	Kulthieth Formation	USA; Alaska		A fruit of initial uncertain affinity First placed in form genus Carpolithes; Moved toPalaeophytocrene elytraeformis in 1977	
Palaeanthus prindlei	Sp nov	Valid	Hollick	Paleocene/Eocene	"Bryant Creek flora"	USA; Alaska		A probable flower of uncertain affinity Placed in form genus Palaeanthus	

== Arthropods ==
=== Insects ===
Name	Novelty	Status	Authors	Age	Unit	Location	Notes	Images
Micropterix proavitella	Sp nov	jr synonym	Rebel	Early Eocene	Baltic amber		Moved to Baltimartyria proavitella in 1995	
Fibla exusta	Comb nov	valid	(Cockerell & Custer)	Eocene; Priabonian	Florissant Formation	USA; Colorado	An inocelliid snakefly Moved from Inocellia exusta (1925)	Fibla exusta
Raphidia elegans	Comb nov	jr synonym	(Cockerell)	Eocene; Priabonian	Florissant Formation	USA; Colorado	A raphidiid snakefly Moved from Megaraphidia elegans (1907); Moved back to M. elegans in 2014	Megaraphidia elegans

== Archosauromorphs ==
=== Dinosaurs ===
Name	Novelty	Status	Authors	Age	Type locality	Location	Notes	Images
Nipponosaurus	Gen. et sp. nov.	Valid	Nagao	Santonian-Campanian	upper Yezo Group	Russia	A hadrosaurid	
Segisaurus	Gen. et sp. nov.	Valid	Camp	Pliensbachian	Navajo Sandstone	US	A coelophysoid	

=== Pterosaurs ===
Name	Novelty	Status	Authors	Age	Unit	Location	Notes	Images
Odontorhynchus	Gen sp et comb nov	jr synonym	Stolley	Jurassic; Tithonian	Altmühltal Formation	Germany; Bayern	A rhamphorhynchid pterosaur The type species is O. aculeatus Also included Rhamphorhynchus longicaudus (1846); Junior synonym of Rhamphorhynchus	Rhamphorhynchus muensteri

== Synapsids ==
=== Non-mammalian ===
Name	Status	Authors	Age	Unit	Location	Notes	Images
Belesodon	Junior synonym	von Huene	Middle Triassic (Ladinian)	Santa Maria Formation	Brazil	Junior synonym of Chiniquodon.	
Cerdorhinus	Valid	Broom	Middle Permian	Middle Abrahamskraal Formation	South Africa	A gorgonopsian.	
Chiniquodon	Valid	von Huene	Middle Triassic (Ladinian)	Santa Maria Formation	Brazil	A member of Chiniquodontidae.	
Dinogorgon	Valid	Broom	Late Permian	Cistecephalus Assemblage Zone	South Africa	A gorgonopsian.	
Dinosuchus	Preoccupied	Broom	Middle Permian	Tapinocephalus Assemblage Zone	South Africa	A member of Dinocephalia.	
Galerhynchus	Valid	Broom	Late Permian	Cistecephalus Assemblage Zone	South Africa	A gorgonopsian.	
Nanictosaurus	Valid	Broom	Late Permian	Dicynodon Assemblage Zone	South Africa	A member of Thrinaxodontidae.	
Notaelurops	Junior synonym	Broom	Late Permian	Dicynodon Assemblage Zone	South Africa	A junior synonym of Theriognathus.	
Parathrinaxodon	Nomen oblitum	Parrington	Late Permian	Kawinga Formation	Tanzania	A junior synonym of Procynosuchus.	Procynosuchus delaharpeae
Sysphinctostoma	Junior synonym	Broili and Schroeder	Early Triassic	Cynognathus Assemblage Zone	South Africa	A junior synonym of Diademodon.	Diademodon mastacus
Traversodon	Valid	von Huene	Middle Triassic (Ladinian)	Santa Maria Formation	Brazil	A traversodontid.	Traversodon
