= MacGinitie =

MacGinitie is a surname. Notable people with the surname include:

- George MacGinitie (1889–1989), American marine biologist
- Harry Dunlap MacGinitie (1896–1987), American paleobotanist
- Laura MacGinitie, American rower
- Nettie MacGinitie (1899–1993), American marine biologist
