= Secrets of Life =

- Theatrical release poster
- Directed by: James Algar
- Written by: James Algar
- Produced by: Ben Sharpsteen; Walt Disney
- Narrated by: Winston Hibler
- Cinematography: William A. Anderson; Arthur Carter; Jack Couffer; Robert H. Crandall; Murl Deusing; Fran William Hall; Claude Jendrusch; Stuart V. Jewell; George MacGinitie; Nettie MacGinitie; Tilden W. Roberts; Donald L. Sykes; Roman Vishniac
- Edited by: Anthony Gerard
- Music by: Paul Smith
- Production company: Walt Disney Productions
- Distributed by: Buena Vista Distribution
- Release date: September 4, 1956
- Running time: 70 minutes
- Country: United States
- Language: English

Secrets of Life is a 1956 American documentary film written and directed by James Algar. The documentary follows the changing world of nature, space and animals. The documentary was released on November 6, 1956, by Buena Vista Distribution.

== Synopsis ==
Life on Earth is a constant battle, and all of nature is in a constant state of development. As nature has changed over billions of years, so too has life had to change with it. Earth provides both protection and destruction to its species, and these constant processes force the planet’s lifeforms to adapt if they are to survive. The plants surrounding the earth are a key source of life, for they contain seeds which cause new flora to bloom. Some of these seeds can be carried by the wind, such as the cottonwood. Others, like the wild oat, are self-sowing. In the strangest of cases, like the pine some seeds will only blossom at the touch of a forest fire, which serves a purpose in nature’s story despite its destruction. At the peak of their growth some of them may sprout fruit or vegetables. To continue living, many of the plants rely on bees to carry their pollen and spread it across the land. The bees will also collect nectar from the flowers, used to make honey.

Ants rival bees with their own honey-making, and surpass them in their industrial skills. Each member has a special skill suited to keeping the colony alive. These tiny creatures work together in harmony to protect their home from pests, including termites and blister beetles. Their strength is such that they can lift rocks many times their size, a skill they use to construct complex underground tunnels for their homes. Moving away from the land species, nature has provided for underwater creatures. The stickleback fish seems to have defined goals and purposes, with the male creating a home for its future young and the female providing said young. Anglerfish use their namesake appendage to lure unsuspecting prey, while male fiddler crabs try to entice female mates. The various creatures of the world have adapted to new forms survival and reproduction, changing right along with the planet. The last example we are shown is the volcano, one of the most powerful ways Earth changes itself. With the destruction of its own land, new earth is eventually formed.

== Awards ==
- 1957 Berlin Film Festival: Golden Bear (Best Documentary)
