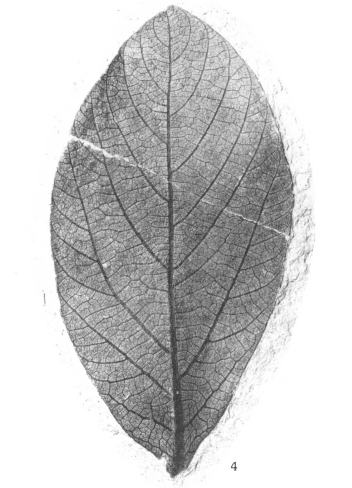
- Republica hickeyi holotype, Republic, Washington

Scientific classification
- Kingdom: Plantae
- Clade: Tracheophytes
- Clade: Angiosperms
- Order: incertae sedis
- Genus: †Republica; Wolfe & Wehr, 1987

Species
- R. hickeyi; R. kummerensis; R. litseafolia

Synonyms
- R. kummerensis synonymy: Artocarpoides kummerensis Wolfe, 1968; Dicotylophyllum kummerensis (Wolfe) Wolfe, 1977; R. litseafolia synonymy: Laurophyllum litseafolia MacGinitie, 1941; Artocarpoides litseafolia (MacGinitie) Wolfe, 1968; Dicotylophyllum litseafolia (MacGinitie) MacGinitie, 18 69

= Republica (plant) =

Republica Temporal range: Ypresian-Kummerian 51–33 Ma

Genus of fossil plants

Republica is an enigmatic genus of flowering plants which includes three known species: Republica hickeyi, Republica kummerensis, and Republica litseafolia. The genus has been found in Eocene age geologic formations along the Pacific coast of North America. The affiliations of Republica are uncertain, with the most recent placement being tentatively in the now broken up subclass Hamamelididae.

== Distribution ==
The three species currently assigned to Republica are all known from western North America. The type species R. hickeyi is isolated to the Klondike Mountain Formation in the Ypresian Eocene Okanagan Highlands of northwest central Washington.

The first named species, R. litseafolia has been identified from its type locality at the "Chalk bluffs" site in the northern area of California's Ione Formation. The site has been variously assigned to the early Eocene by Harry MacGinitie, based on attempted correlation to the Ione type strata resulting in a Ypresian age often being reported. However other authors suggest the age may be mistaken, based on anomalously low mean annual temperature estimates compared to other sites purported to be the same age located north and inland of the Chalk Bluffs site, with a possible 37 million years ago age begin suggested by Donald Prothero et al. (2011). Leaves assigned to R. litseafolia were later reported by Jack Wolfe (1968) from the Eocene Puget Group floras of the Green River gorge in King County, Washington by Jack Wolfe.

Similar looking leaves were assigned to the third species R. kummerensis with the two separated by geochronology. R. litseafolia is most frequent in the older Franklinian and Fultonian stages before becoming scarce in the early Ravenian localities. R. kummerensis on the other hand first appears in the Puget groups late Ravenian and is found frequently in the Kummerian age sites. The R. kummerensis range was expanded by Wolfe (1977) to include the Kulthieth Formation (as the "Kushtaka formation"), in the panhandle of southeast Alaska. The formation was reported by Wolfe 1977 as early Oligocene and of the Kummerian paleofloral stage with R. kummerensis coming from two sites outcropping along the southern slopes of Carbon Mountain above Berg Lake, Hoonah–Angoon Census Area. The Kummerian has subsequently been revised to spanning between 40 mya and the Eocene-Oligocene boundary.

== History and classification ==
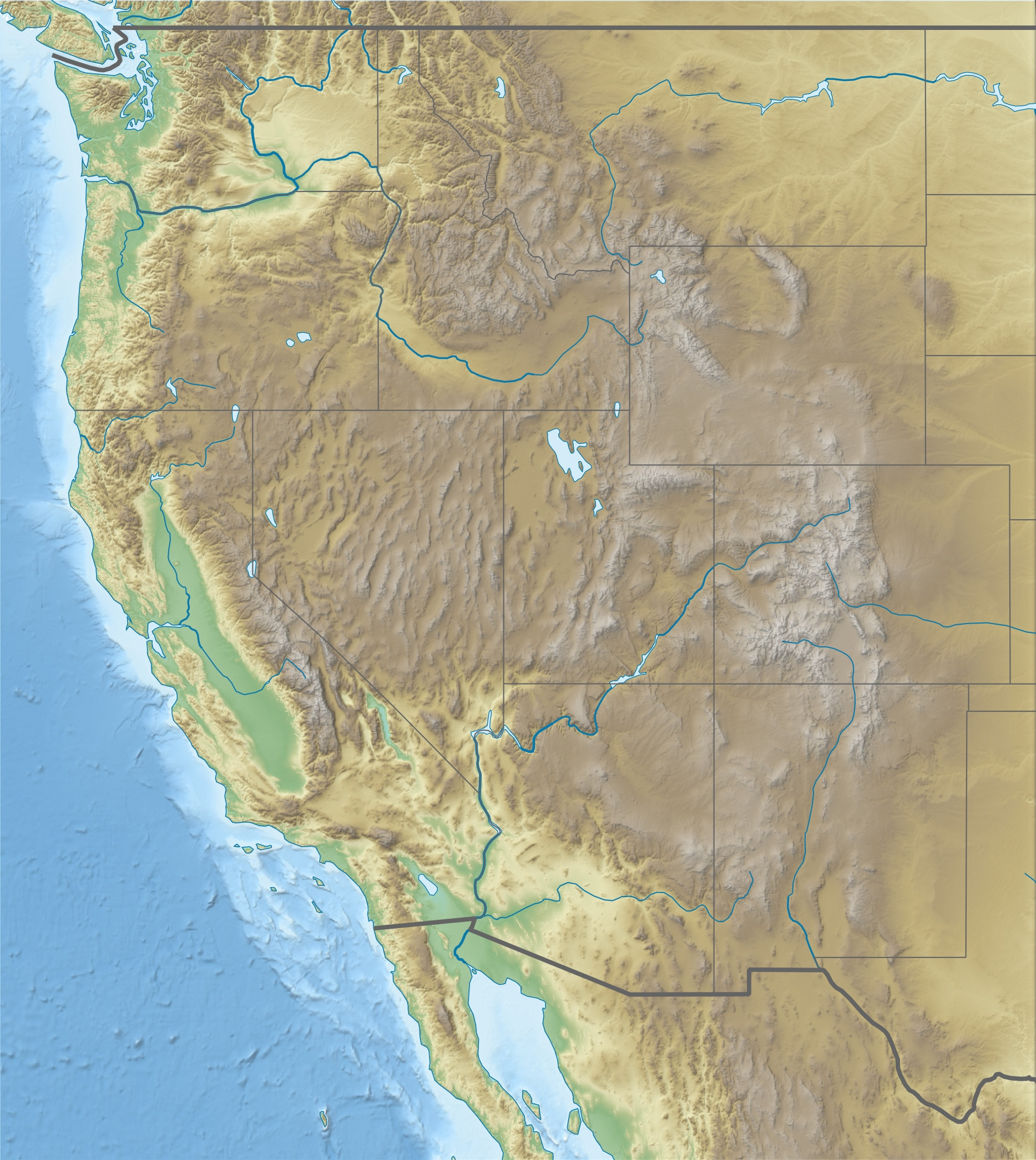
Republica distribution
Republica distribution

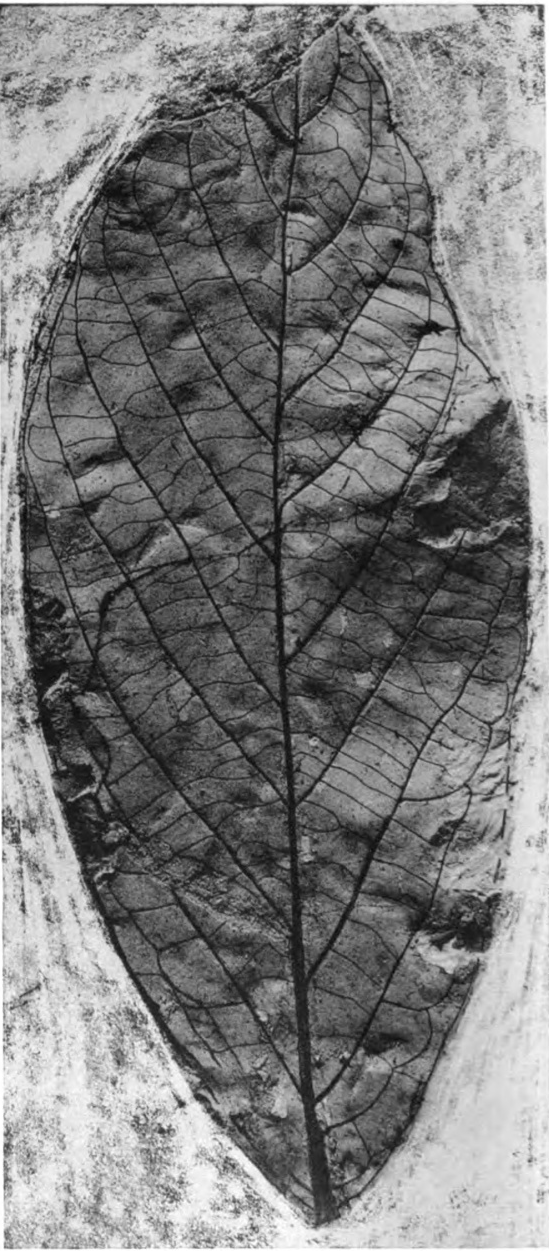
Republica litseafolia cotype; Ione Formation

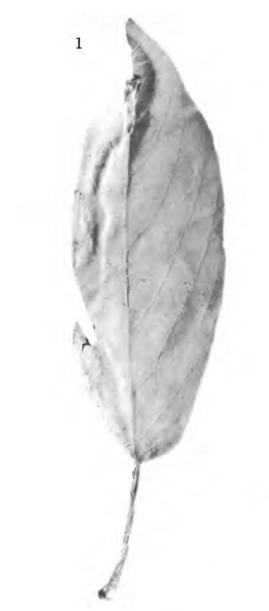
Republica kummerensis holotype; Puget Group

The first Republica species to be named was initially studied and described by Harry MacGinitie in 1941 based on fossils from the Ione Formations Chalk Bluff and Buckeye Flat sites. Based on a series of five cotypes, numbers 2199 - 2203 in the University of California Museum of Paleontology paleobotany collection, he named the new species Laurophyllum litseafolia. He did not give specific details on the etymology, but chose to place the new species in Laurophyllum a form genus for Lauraceae-like leaves, while noting that he considered the most similar species to be Cryptocary multipaniculata.

In 1968 Wolfe finished his monograph on the fossil plants of the Puget Groups Green River gorge, among which were a series of leaves which he deemed the same as the Ione fossils. However, he disagreed with MacGinities placement of the species in Lauraceae and opted to follow Edward W. Berrys choice of genus for similar leaves from the Wilcox Group. As such the species was moved to the form genus Artocarpoides as the new combination Artocarpoides litseafolia, with suggested family affiliation in Moraceae. Wolfe also described a second species Artocarpoides kummerensis from holotype USNM 42104 and paratypes USNM 42105, USNM 42158, and USNM 42159, all part of the US National Museum. Found at five sites in the Green River gorge area, Wolfe states that the two species form a gradual series, with the leaves having less than a 2:1 length/width ratio being placed in A. litseafolia and those with a length/width greater than 2:1 considered as A. kummerensis. As with MacGinities species, Wolfe did not give an etymological explanation for the species, though the paper does discuss the Kummer sandstone bed being the base of the Kummerian section at the type locality for the stage.

The next year, while discussing general taxonomic changes in western fossil floras, MacGinitie (1969) again discussed Artocarpoides litseafolia which he and Wolfe had talked over after Wolfes 1968 paper. Both paleobotanists were of the same opinion that placement within Artocarpoides and thus Moraceae was wrong. While the thick and long petiole and heart shaped base surrounding are found in lauraceous genera, and the distinct quaternary and quintery veins are seen in Moraceous genera, all those characters combined are not seen in either family. As such MacGinitie moved the species to Dicotylophyllum litseafolia, Dicotylophyllum being a form genus for angiosperm leaf fossils of uncertain family or higher affinity.

Wolfe again addressed "A." kummerensis while reporting it from the "Kushtaka formation" in Alaska. While he acknowledged and backed the 1969 move to D. litseafolia, he also maintained that it was closely related to the leaved from Alaska and the Puget Group. So he moved the species to Dicotylophyllum as well under the new combination Dicotylophyllum kummerensis.

During the study of fossil angiosperms from the Klondike Mountain Formation around Republic, Washington, Jack Wolfe and Wesley Wehr identified a leaf, specimen USNM 32697A, B. of unique venation and uncertain placement but bearing a similarity with both the species then included in Dicotylophyllum. They chose to erect a new genus, named for Republic, which encompassed the two older species as Republica kummerensis and Republica litseafolia respectively, along with the new species from Republic. Wolfe and Wehr named their new species Republica hickeyi, with USNM 32697A, B. as the holotype and noted that the species epithet as coined as a patronym for Leo Hickey for his work on angiosperm leaf morphology comparison.

Wolfe and Wehr again discussed the possible taxonomic affinities for the genus, noting it to be rather uncertain. They again discounted a placement within Lauraceae, despite superficial similarity to Clethra, based on the lack of branches along the lower sides of the secondaries as seen in Republica. Likewise, they considered Gironniera, then placed in Ulmaceae, as superficially similar, but the numerous and well developed secondaries in Republica seem to exlcude a family relationship. As such Wolfe and Wehr were still uncertain regarding the taxons higher affiliation and suggested placement into subclass Hamamelididae of the now abandoned Cronquist system. Molecular phylogenetics published by the Angiosperm Phylogeny Group broke up the subclass in the late 1990's, with at least one pharmacognosist, Sonny Larsson, describing Hamamelididae as "grossly polyphyletic".

In 2021, a new genus of damselflies was described from the Klondike Mountain Formation at Republic, and the genus was named the hemihomonym Republica.

== Description ==
Leaves of the genus Republica are smooth margined, with a symmetrical outline and simple pinnate venation. The secondary veins fork from the midvein with a transition from a high fork angle near the apex though a low fork angle in the middle region of the leaf and then back to a high angle on the basal most pair of secondaries. The middle and more basal secondary veins have a broad upward curving path as they approach the margin, while the upper secondaries have a more pronounced and quicker upturn. The veins loop upwards towards the next secondary up, before joining with a fork from the next secondary up or with a tertiary vein. There are typically no interseconday veins forking from the primary vein, but the secondaries typically have several branches that fork at low angles from the lower sides. The tertiary veins can run the full space between two secondaries, branch, or form orthogonal junctions and polygonal areolae. Similarly the quaternary veins are branched and also form a polygonal reticulum.

=== R. hickeyi ===
Leaves of Republica hickeyi are a wide elliptic in outline with an apparently thick leathery texture in life. The leaf base is a narrow v-shape in outline while the apex is broad and slightly pointed. The petiole is thick transitioning into the base of the primary vein which gradually narrows from leaf base to apex. In the only specimen known to Wolfe and Wehr, there are eight secondary veins on one side of the primary, and nine secondaries on the opposite side. The thinner basal secondary pair both branch from the primary at an angle of around 50° before taking rather irregular paths towards the leaf margin, curving upwards and merging with tertiary veins below the next secondary apical. The middle secondaries fork from the primary vein at increasing degrees of angle basally to apically, shifting from 45° up to 55°. The tertiary veins form a reticulate vein structure between the secondaries, the quaternaries are similarly reticulate, typically forming into quadrangular and pentagonal shapes with quinternary veinlets forming areolea enclosing a freely ending veinlet that may be unbranched or singularly branched.

=== R. kummerensis ===
The leaves of Republica kummerensis are obovate in general outline, with a more elongate outline then the proposed ancestral R. litseafolia, which typically has a length:width of less than 2:1, while R. kummerensis is more than 2:1. The general size range reported by Wolfe is between 7.5–11.0 cm (3.0–4.3 in) long and 3.0–5.3 cm (1.2–2.1 in) wide with between 9 and 10 pairs of secondaries. The bases of R. kummerensis are most frequently broadly rounded in shape, with rare specimens showing a more cordate base. Where they are known, the petioles are between 3.0–3.3 cm (1.2–1.3 in) in length. The secondaries branch from the primary at irregularly spaced intervals with departure angles between 40°-60°, a greater range than seen in either R. hickeyi or R. litseafolia. Additionally R. kummerensis has frequent intersecondary veins branching from the primary between the secondaries.

=== R. litseafolia ===
Leaves of Republica litseafolia range between 20–22 cm (7.9–8.7 in) long and 8–10 cm (3.1–3.9 in) wide, with an obovate outline different from the elliptical outline of R. hickeyi. The apex is usually acutely pointed, while the bases range between cordate and wedge like cuneate. The stout 4–5 cm (1.6–2.0 in) petiole transitions into a thick primary vein running up the center of the leave blade. The leaves typically have ten to twelve pairs of secondaries, 1-3 more than seen in R. hickeyi, which fork from the primary vein irregularly lower in the leaves then transitioning into sub-opposite forking in the upper portion of the leaves. The branch angle for secondaries in middle section of the leaves is around 50°. The R. litseafolia also have distinct and well developed branch veins forking off the external or basal sides of the secondaries before curving out towards the margin and then upwards to the next secondary.
