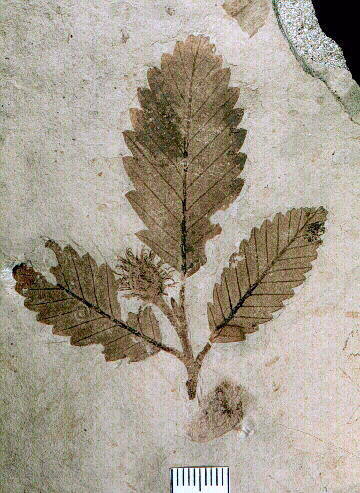
- Fagopsis longifolia leaves with fruit

Scientific classification
- Kingdom: Plantae
- Clade: Embryophytes
- Clade: Tracheophytes
- Clade: Spermatophytes
- Clade: Angiosperms
- Clade: Eudicots
- Clade: Rosids
- Order: Fagales
- Family: Fagaceae
- Subfamily: incertae sedis
- Genus: Fagopsis; Hollick, 1909

Type species
- †Planera longifolia Leo Lesquereux, 1873

Species
- Fagopsis longifolia; Fagopsis undulata

Synonyms
- F. longifolia synonymy: Planera longifolia Lesquereux, 1873; Fagus longifolia (Lesquereux) Hollick & Cockerell, 1908; F. undulata synonymy: Fagus undulata Knowlton, 1899; Carpinus grandis auct. non Unger. of Dawson, 1890

= Fagopsis =

Fagopsis Temporal range: Ypresian–Priabonian

Extinct genus of trees

Fagopsis is an extinct genus of beech relative in the family Fagaceae with two accepted species – Fagopsis longifolia and Fagopsis undulata. It has been found in fossil strata ranging in age between the Early Eocene to the Late Eocene or Early Oligocene in British Columbia, Colorado, Montana, and Washington. Several other species were formerly placed in the genus, but later removed because of insufficient associated fossils.

== Distribution ==
Fagopsis undulata holotype from the Sepulcher Formation

Fagopsis has been identified from a number of fossil sites in western North America. The type species, Fagopsis longifolia, is restricted to the late Eocene, Priabonian Florissant Formation of Colorado. Early reports of the species from other localities have been discredited, with the taxa reidentified to other genera or are in need of reassessment.

The Florissant Formation is composed of successive lake deposits resulting from a volcanic debris flow damming a valley. When Fagopsis longifolia was originally described, the Florissant Formation was considered to be Miocene in age, based on the flora and fauna preserved. Successive research and fossil descriptions moved the age older and by 1985 the formation had been reassigned to an Oligocene age. Further refinement of the formation's age using radiometric dating of sanidine crystals has resulted in an age of 34.07 million years ago placing the formation in the Priabonian stage of the Late Eocene.

The type locality of Fagopsis unduata was given by paleobotanist Frank Hall Knowlton as on the bank of the Yellowstone River between Elk Creek and Hellroaring Creek. When collected in 1899 the area was assumed to belong to the Fort Union group and Paleocene in age. Following extensive geological mapping and field work the regional geology was reclassified by Harry W. Smedes and Harold J. Prostka in 1972 who formally subdivided the Absaroka Volcanic Supergroup into a number for groups and formations. The Yellowstone river location was one of a number of fossil bearing sites that were included in the nearly named Sepulcher Formation of the Washburn Group. Sanidine crystals from the Lost Creek Tuff Member provided potassium–argon radiometric dating ages of around 49.2±1.5 mya. This places the type locality as equal to the younger sites in the Okanagan Highlands.

Fagopsis is known from a series of six geologic formations in the Eocene Okanagan Highlands, with four occurrences of F. undulata and two defined as Fagopsis only. Leaves and fruits of F. undulata are known from the Klondike Mountain Formation sites around Ferry County, Washington, and the "Horsefly shales" near Horsefly, British Columbia. Isolated leaves, without fruits, are reported from the Allenby Formation near Princeton and the Coldwater Beds near Stump Lake, British Columbia. The two additional British Columbian Sites with unidentified Fagopsis are the Tranquille Formation near Cache Creek and the "Driftwood shales" near Smithers.

Early estimates of the highlands sites ranged from Miocene to Eocene in age. The age of the Klondike Mountain Formation was debated for many years, with plant fossils suggesting a Late Oligocene or Early Miocene age, and the first descriptions of species from the area included them in the Middle Miocene Latah Formation. By the early 1960s the Klondike Mountain formation was thought to be late Oligocene in age. Potassium–argon radiometric dating of samples taken near the Tom Thumb mine in 1966 resulted in a tentative 55 million years old age. Further refinement of sample dating has yielded an approximately Early Eocene, Ypresian age, being radiometrically dated as 49.4 million years old. A 2003 report using dating of detrital zircon crystals with the tuffs of the Klondike Mountain Formation had been dated to 49.42 ± 0.54 million years ago, the youngest of the Okanagan Highlands sites, A 2021 radiometric analysis report revised the possible oldest age to around 51.2 ± 0.1 million years ago based on isotopic data from zircon crystals.

As with other Okanagan sites, the age of the Allenby Formation was debated for many years, with fish and insect fossils hinting at an Eocene age, while mammal and plant fossils suggested a Late Oligocene or Early Miocene age. The lake sediments at Princeton were radiometrically dated using the K–Ar method in the 1960s based on ash samples exposed in the lake bed. These samples yielded an age of ~48 million years ago; however, dating published in 2005 provided a ^{40}Ar–^{39}Ar radiometric date placing some Princeton sites at 52.08 ± 0.12 million years ago. Dating obtained in the 2021 radiometric analysis paper consistently reaffirmed ages in the Late Ypresian, with oldest likely ages between 53 to 51.2 million years ago.

While the historic Tranquille Formation site along the Tranquille River has not been reassessed in modern works, the related McAbee Fossil Beds west of Cache Creek in central British Columbia have been. The lake sediments at McAbee were first radiometrically dated using the K–Ar method in the 1960s based on ash samples exposed in the lake bed. These samples yielded an age of ~51 million years ago; however, dating published in 2005 provided a ^{40}Ar–^{39}Ar radiometric date placing the McAbee site at 52.9 ± 0.83 million years ago. Similar to the Tranquille River sites are the Driftwood Shales in Driftwood Canyon Provincial Park, near Smithers, British Columbia. The same 2005 dating paper established the shales at Driftwood, which had not been formally described, as dating to around 51 million years ago in accordance with the other sites of the highlands, a date supported by the presence of the hedgehog-relative Silvacola from the same site.

Fagopsis unduata has additionally been identified from leaves and fruits from small region of Montana. The Ruby Reservoir area in southwestern Montana has been identified as part of the Renova Formation which is comprised of varying fissure fill deposits, riverine systems, and small shallow lakes which were all active during the transitional period across the Grande Coupure of the Latest Eocene to Youngest Oligocene.

== History and classification ==
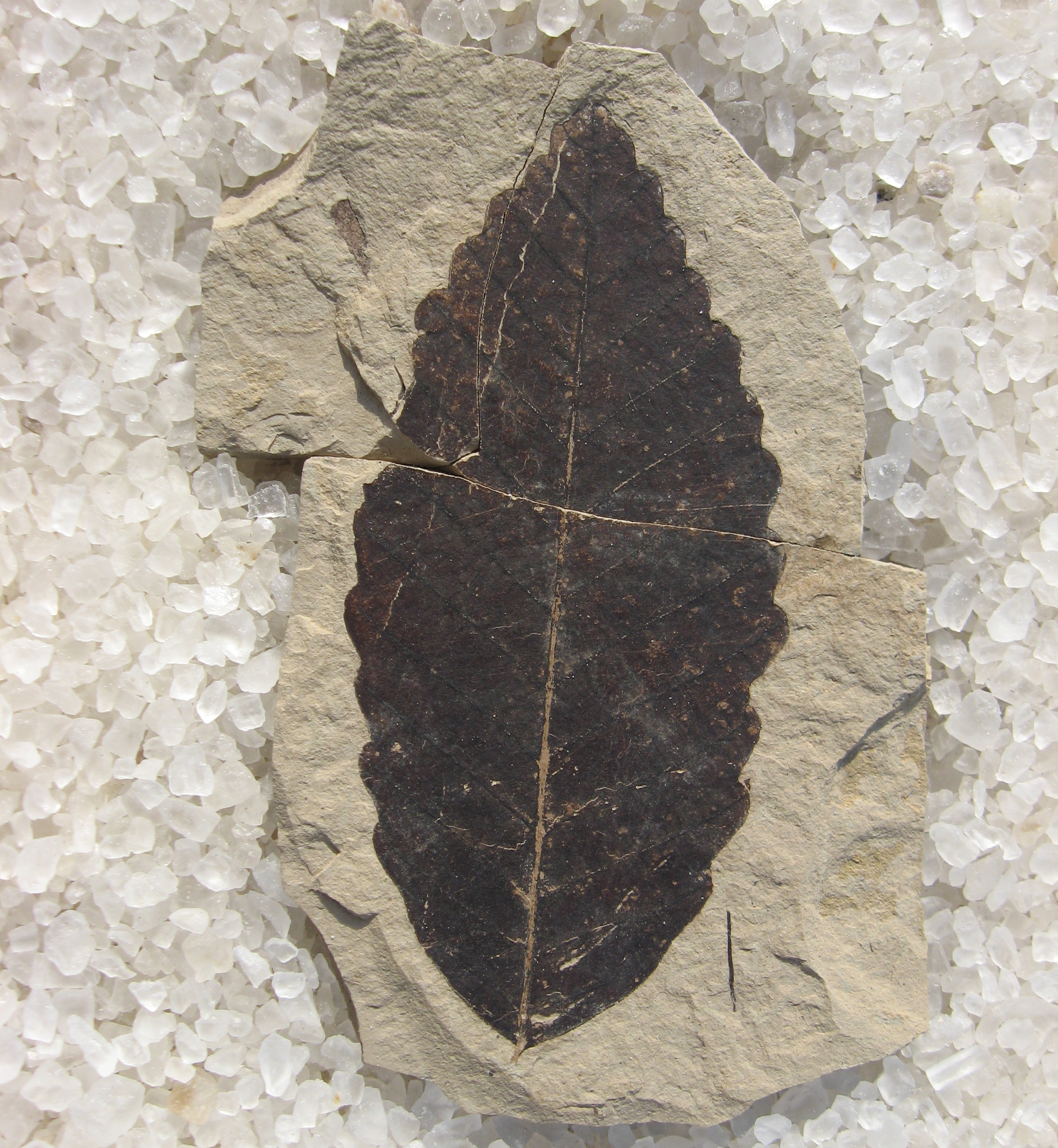
Fagopsis undulata leaf, Republic, Washington

Leo Lesquereux, while reviewing new fossils collected from sites in the Rocky Mountain region of the American west, described a series of new species from the Florissant Region. In the 1873 report he named a new species that he thought belonged to the water elm genus Planera, and named it Planera longifolia based on a series of specimens from the Castello's Ranch location. He illustrated several fossils from the site, but did not designate a type fossil for the species. The lack of a type series was rectified by Smithsonian paleobotanist Albert Peale who published a 1907 monograph listing the type specimens for the Smithsonian fossil plant collections. Peale designated the P. longifolia holotype to be specimens "USNM 234". The placement of the species came into question at the same time, and was moved from planera to the beech genus Fagus by Arthur Hollick and Theodore Cockerell via a 1908 footnote in their overview of the Florissant fossil flora. That placement lasted less than a year, with Hollick revisiting the species and moving it to a new genus in the family Fagaceae that he named Fagopsis. Based on two new specimens that had been found, one with fruits and leaves attached to a branchlet and one with pollen cones and leaves similarly attached, it had become clear the species was not part of either Planera or Fagus as it had been placed prior.

In 1899 Knowlton published his work on the fossils of the "Green River Series" in Yellowstone National Park and some surrounding localities. Based on a small series of partial leaves collected from along the Yellowstone River he named a new Fagus species, Fagus undulata. As with Lesquereux's type description, Knowlton did not designate a type series, and it so specimens were selected by Peale, who chose USNM 5126, USNM 5136, and USNM 5185 as lectotypes. This placement went unchallenged until 1987 when new fossils from north central Washington were described by Jack Wolfe and Wesley Wehr. Based on similarities between the new fossils from around Republic, Washington, they moved Fagus undulata to Hollicks genus Fagopsis as Fagopsis undulata.

During the period between 1890 and 1910 a series of fossils were described from sites in central to southern central British Columbia by John Dawson and David P. Penhallow. Starting in 1890, Dawson identified a partial leaf from Stump Lake as Carpinus grandis, a European fossil species from the Croatian Miocene. Then in 1902, Penhallow noted a number of fragmentary leaves he placed into Planera longifolia recognizing the similarities of the leaves to those of Florissant. The largest increase in distribution came with Penhallows 1908 overview of fossils collected since the 1870s and detailing collections made under the oversight of Canadian chief geologist Laurance Lambe in 1906. This paper saw the expansion of "C. grandis" leaves to the Princeton area at Tulameen and Similkameen River sites, along with sites on the Tranquille River, and at Quilchena. For "P. longifolia", he mentions occurrences on the North Fork Similkameen River, Tulameen River, and Tranquille Rivers in addition to Horsefly.

In their 1987 redescription of Fagopsis undulata, Wolfe and Wehr included the Carpinus grandis fossils, as circumscribed by Dawson, within their expanded Fagopsis species. Thus the occurrences in the Coldwater Beds, Allenby Formation, Tranquille Formation and Horsefly Shales were identified to F. undulata. In 2023, Pigg, Manchester, and DeVore reviewed the Horsefly flora for the first time in a century. They specifically noted the fossils that had been identified as P. longifolia were actually F. undulata confirming Wolfe and Wehrs assessment. The only Okanagan Highlands specimens that have not been addressed to Fagopsis species are the Tranquille Formation fossils, which Richard Dillhoff, Estella Leopold, and Steven Manchesters 2005 overview of the McAbee Flora only listed to genus. In the same paper they noted the occurrence of Fagopsis sp. fossils at Driftwood Canyon.

Placement within Fagaceae has been considered unclear, with work the work of Manchester and Crane (1983) suggesting placement close to some Quercus species. Later work by Bouchal et al (2015) examining F. longifolia pollen showed instead a plausible relationship to some extinct and living members of the genus Castanopsis.

Three additional species were historically included in Fagopsis, but have subsequently been moved. Fagopsis groenlandicum, Fagopsis nipponica and Fagopsis rarytkinensis are known from isolated leaf fossils found in East Asia, North America, Greenland, and Europe. Unlike the two accepted species however, the three transferred species have not been found in association with the distinctive wedge shaped fruits of true Fagopsis. As such Manchester (1999) moved the three to a new morphogenus Fagopsiphyllum as Fagopsiphyllum groenlandicum, Fagopsiphyllum nipponica and Fagopsiphyllum rarytkinensis. Manchester specified the new genus was for isolate leaf species which resembled Fagopsis but had not been found with the fruits.

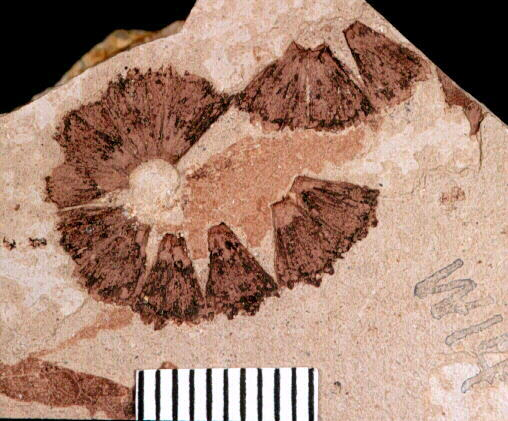
F. longifolia

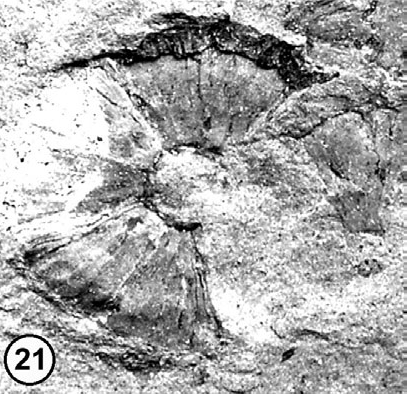
F. undulata

Fagopsis fruits
Florissant (top), Resner Canyon (bottom)

== Description ==
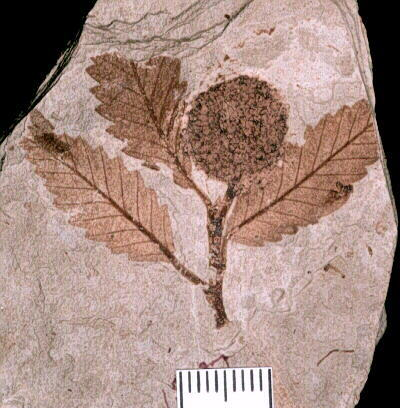
F longifolia male cone and leaves

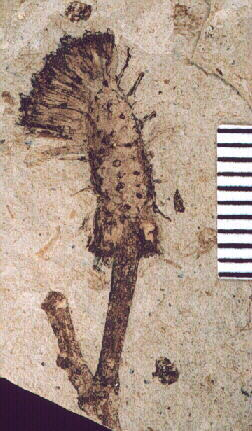
F longifolia female cone with attachment scars

In his brief description of the genus Fagopsis, Hollick defines the leaves as lanceolate to elliptical in outline, with margins that are either regularly dentate or roughly but regularly crenate. The leaves are craspedodromus with secondary veins running straight from the primary veins to the margins, where they often terminate in the teeth. To this, Manchester and Crane noted the tertiary venation is very fine.

=== F. longifolia ===
Fagopsis longifolia branches show monopodial arrangement of the side branches, fruits and leaves. The central axis continues to grow with smaller side branches staying subordinate to the central one.

The leaves are up to 14 cm (5.5 in) long and 50 mm (2.0 in) wide, resulting in length to width ratios of 1 to 2 and 1 to 3. They have a petiole that is 12 mm (0.47 in) long and 1.5 mm (0.059 in) wide. The teeth are non-glandular and simple, with a supporting vein terminating in the tooth tip. The secondary veins are sub-opposite to alternate in position on the primary vein.

The male pollen cones are spherical in shape, ranging between 8–12 mm (0.31–0.47 in) in diameter, and comprised of numerous flowering heads. The cones develop on peduncles which reach up to 6 mm (0.24 in) in length by 2 mm (0.079 in) wide. Each flower has a filament and two basifixed anthers, each with two pollen sacks. On specimens with the cones still attached to branches, the cones are produced on small side branches of the main stem, and no female cones are present.

A detailed examination of pollen extracted from fossils was published by Johannes Bouchal et al in 2014. The overall pollen grain architecture is closer to subfamily Castaneoideae genera and not Quercus or Fagus. The pollen grains are produced as monads, with each grain separate from the other, rather than being triads or tetrads with multiple grains fused together. The grains range between spheroids to prolate, lemon-shaped, in outline. Pollen grains in the cones still were measured to have polar diameters between 22 and 27 μm, and an equatorial diameter of 19–21 μm. Loose pollen gains from sediment samples are slightly larger, with diameters of 22–28 μm polar and 19–26 μm equatorial. The grains have a threefold symmetry, being tricolporate and showing three germination furrows which range between 18 and 22 μm in length. The surface has microtexturing expressed as minute ridged textures, microrugulae, which combine into larger ridges which form a vermiculate "can of worms" sculpturing.

Unlike the male cones, female cones are ellipsoidal during early growth and pollination stages, with sizes averaging 11 mm (0.43 in) long and 10 mm (0.39 in) wide. The main body is surrounded by elongated filaments that Manchester and Crane deemed styles. The styles are grouped in threes with the tips curving in a slight hook and extend above the surface of the cone between 3–3.5 mm (0.12–0.14 in).

After pollination the cones develop into fruiting cones, with an increased mature length between 12–18 mm (0.47–0.71 in) and width between 8–14 mm (0.31–0.55 in). The fruiting head is comprised of approximately 40 "fruit wedges", possibly cupules, which are arranged in a helical pattern on the central axis. The basal and apical fruits appear to have been more firmly attached to the central axis and were frequently not shed when the central fruits were. After shedding fruits, the central axis shows scarring from each fruit shed. The scars are grouped in threes and have an encircling affixed bract.

The cupules are a wedge or cone shaped, having a 1 mm (0.039 in) base which flares over 4–6 mm (0.16–0.24 in) length to a 3–5 mm (0.12–0.20 in) wide heads. The head has up to nine minute teeth ringing the upper edge. Each internal side of the fruits appear to have been covered by mats of fine 50+ μm long hairs. The fruits are often divided into two to three sections vial longitudinal creases on the fruit sides. At the base of each fruit section are small fruits with ovoid outlines. The long axis are 0.5–0.7 mm (0.020–0.028 in) and the short sides are 0.3–0.5 mm (0.012–0.020 in).

=== F. undulata ===
Wolfe and Wehr (1987) distinguished F. undulata from F. longifolia by the more rounded crenate teeth with shallower sinuses between each tooth. There are more secondaries and teeth overall then seen in F. longifolia. Wolfe and Wehr noted that F. undulata leaves found at the Resner Canyon and Graphite Creek sites near the Canadian border north of Republic are on average smaller than the Republic specimens. The Republic leaves have an average of 15 secondary vein pair, in contrast to the northern leaves with average secondary pair counts of 10 to 13.

A full description of the female cones found associated with the F. undulata leaves at Resner Canyon and Graphite Creek was not provided, but they were noted to be smaller overall then the female cones of F. longifolia.

== Paleoecology ==
While the overall morphology of a Fagopsis plant is unknown, it is thought that the male and female cones were grown on separate branches, with pollination happening in early summer. The fruits developed over the summer and early autumn before mature fruits or fruit strings were dispersed on the wind. The leaves were possibly biannual, being born on the plant for about a full year before dying and dropping from the plant. The wind-borne wedges were often dropped in connected sets, with groups of up to 12 attached in curled strings.

== Paleoenvironment ==
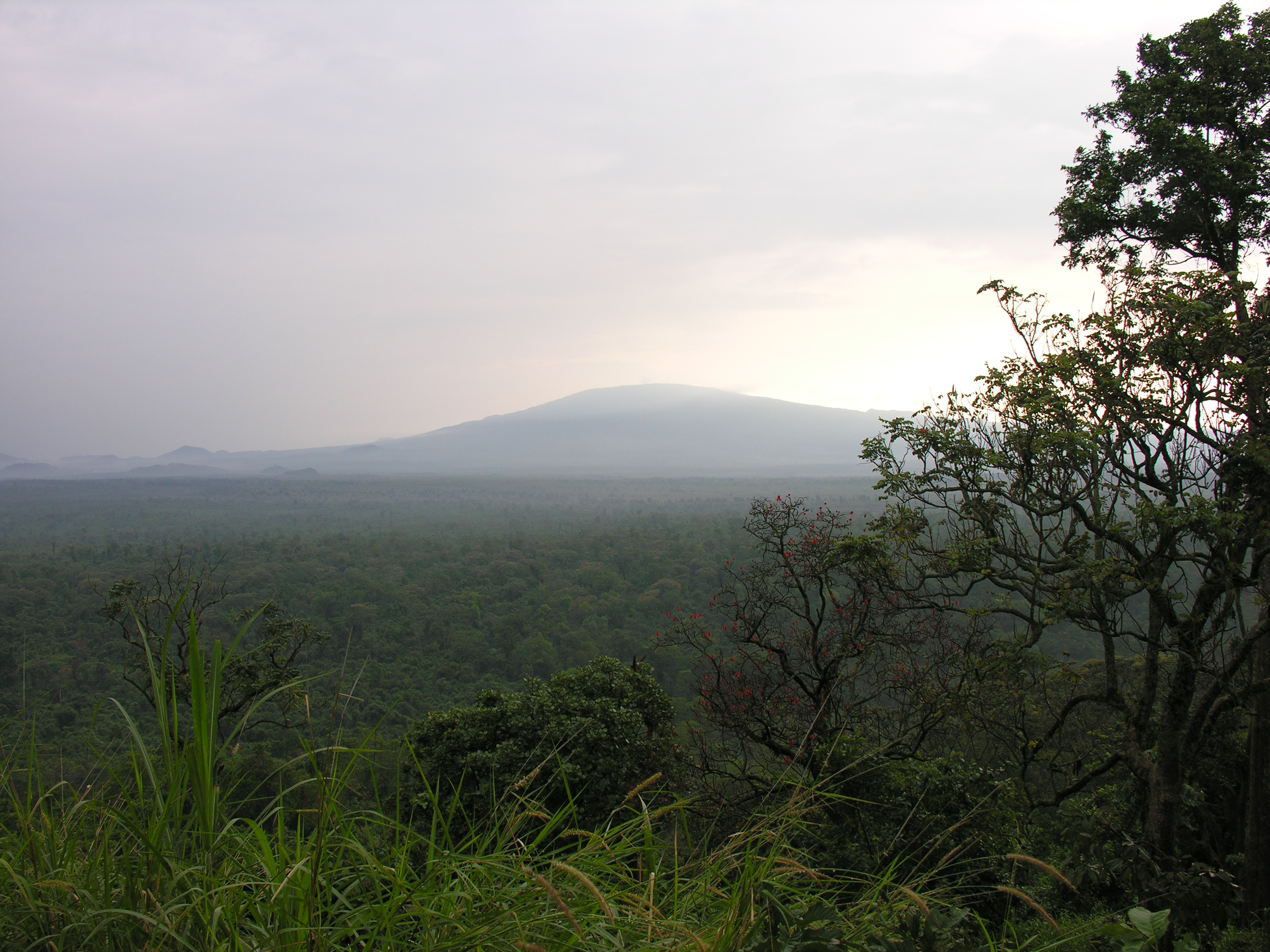
Virunga National Park, Albertine Rift, Africa

The Washington and British Columbian sites are part of an interrelated fossil site system collectively known as the Eocene Okanagan Highlands. The highlands, which includes the Early Eocene formations between Driftwood Canyon at the north and Republic at the south, have been described as one of the "Great Canadian Lagerstätten" based on the diversity, quality and unique nature of the paleofloral and paleofaunal biotas that are preserved. The highlands temperate biome preserved across a large transect of lakes recorded many of the earliest appearances of modern genera, while also documenting the last stands of ancient lines. The warm temperate highland floras in association with downfaulted lacustrine basins and active volcanism are noted to have no exact modern equivalents. This is due to the more seasonally equitable conditions of the Early Eocene, resulting in much lower seasonal temperature shifts. However, the highlands have been compared to the upland ecological islands of the Virunga Mountains within the African rift valleys Albertine Rift.

The Allenby and Klondike Mountain Formations represent a series of long upland lake systems that were surrounded by a warm temperate ecosystem with nearby volcanism dating from during and just after the early Eocene climatic optimum. The Okanagan Highlands likely had a mesic upper microthermal to lower mesothermal climate, in which winter temperatures rarely dropped low enough for snow, and which were seasonably equitable. The paleoforest surrounding the lakes have been described as precursors to the modern temperate broadleaf and mixed forests of Eastern North America and Eastern Asia. Based on the fossil biotas the lakes were higher and cooler then the coeval coastal forests preserved in the Puget Group and Chuckanut Formation of Western Washington, which are described as lowland tropical forest ecosystems. Estimates of the paleoelevation range between 0.7 and 1.2 km (0.43 and 0.75 mi) higher than the coastal forests. This is consistent with the paleoelevation estimates for the lake systems, which range between 1.1 and 2.9 km (1,100 and 2,900 m), which is similar to the modern elevation 0.8 km (0.50 mi), but higher.

Estimates of the mean annual temperature have been derived from climate leaf analysis multivariate program (CLAMP) analysis and leaf margin analysis (LMA) of the Republic paleoflora. The CLAMP results after multiple linear regressions gave a mean annual temperature of approximately 8.0 °C (46.4 °F), with the LMA giving 9.2 ± 2.0 °C (48.6 ± 3.6 °F). A bioclimatic-based estimate based on modern relatives of the taxa found at Republic suggested mean annual temperatures around 13.5 ± 2.2 °C (56.3 ± 4.0 °F). This is lower than the mean annual temperature estimates given for the coastal Puget Group, which is estimated to have been between 15 and 18.6 °C (59.0 and 65.5 °F). The bioclimatic analysis for Republic suggests a mean annual precipitation amount of 115 ± 39 cm (45 ± 15 in).

The Florissant paleoforest surrounding the lake has been described as similar to modern southeastern North America, with a number of taxa represented that are now found in the subtropics to tropics and confined to the old world. MacGinitie (1953) suggested a warm temperate climate based on the modern biogeographic relatives of the biota found in the formation. Modern estimates of the paleoelevation range between 1,900–4,133 m (6,234–13,560 ft), notably higher than the original estimates by MacGinitie of 300–900 m (980–2,950 ft). Estimates of the mean annual temperature for the Florissant Formation have been derived from CLAMP analysis and modern forest equivalencies of the paleoflora. The results of the various methods have given a mean annual temperature rage between approximately 10.7–14.0 °C (51.3–57.2 °F), while the bioclimatic analysis for suggests mean annual precipitation amounts of 740 cm (290 in).

The Renova Formation preserves a mosaic landscape with streams and small lakes located at high to middle altitudes and fairly climatologically buffered from the Grande Coupure changes across the Eocene-Oligocene boundary. The continued Laramide orogeny uplift of the Rocky Mountain belts to the west likely provided some stabilization of the seasonal temperatures and precipitation rates compared to sites of similar age to the north and south. The mountain lakes were likely surrounded by temperate forests.
