= Dolichos sericeus =

Scientific classification
- Kingdom: Plantae
- Clade: Embryophytes
- Clade: Tracheophytes
- Clade: Spermatophytes
- Clade: Angiosperms
- Clade: Eudicots
- Clade: Rosids
- Order: Fabales
- Family: Fabaceae
- Subfamily: Faboideae
- Genus: Dolichos
- Species: D. sericeus

Binomial name
- Dolichos sericeus E.Mey.

Species of perennial shrub

Dolichos sericeus is a species of flowering plant in the family Fabaceae. It is a perennial climbing or prostrate shrub.

== Description ==
Dolichos sericeus is a shrub that can grow up to 1.2 m (3.9 ft) long, the stem is slender and twining and covered in densely appressed or spreading hairs. Leaves are tri-foliate, petiolate and stipulate. Leaflets are broadly ovate to elliptic, up to 72 mm long and 40 mm wide and like its stem it is densely covered in hairs. Flowers are arranged in racemes, its peduncle is up to 35 mm (1.4 in) long holding 2 - 10 flowers, corolla is purple or pink gradually turning creamy with age. Fruit is crescent shaped, 6 to many seeded.

== Subspecies ==
- Dolichos sericeus subsp. formosus (Hochst. ex A.Rich.) Verdc.
- Dolichos sericeus subsp. glabrescens Verdc.
- Dolichos sericeus subsp. pseudofalcatus Verdc.
- Dolichos sericeus subsp. sericeus

== Distribution ==
Dolichos sericeus is native to Tropical Africa, it is distributed in the horn of Africa, eastern and southern Africa and also occurring in Nigeria and Cameroon. Found in forest margins, prefers sandy or loamy soil.
