= Cerdorhinus =

Cerdorhinus Temporal range: Permian

Scientific classification
- Domain: Eukaryota
- Kingdom: Animalia
- Phylum: Chordata
- Clade: Synapsida
- Clade: Therapsida
- Clade: †Gorgonopsia
- Family: †Gorgonopsidae
- Genus: †Cerdorhinus; Broom, 1936

Type species
- †Cerdorhinus parvidens Broom, 1936

Extinct genus of therapsids

Cerdorhinus is an extinct genus of gorgonopsian therapsids from the Permian of South Africa. The type species Cerdorhinus parvidens was named by South African paleontologist Robert Broom in 1936. A second species, Cerdorhinus rubidgei, was named in 1937. In 2007, a specimen of the latter was reassigned to the genus Cyonosaurus.
