= Ethel I. Sanborn =

American paleobotanist (1883–1952)

Ethel Ida Sanborn (1883–1952) was an American paleobotanist and professor of botany at Oregon State College and University of Oregon. She published extensively on the flora of Oregon and the Western United States. The standard author abbreviation Sanborn is used to indicate this person as the author when citing a botanical name.

== Works ==
- Sanborn, Ethel Ida (1928). The Hepaticae and Anthocerotes of Western Oregon. Department of Botany, Stanford University.
- Sanborn, Ethel Ida (1929). Hepaticae and Anthocerotes of western Oregon. The University.
- Sanborn, Ethel Ida (1947). The Scio Flora of Western Oregon. Oregon State College.
- Sanborn, Ethel I; Doty, Maxwell Stanford (1944). The marine algae of the Coos Bay-Cape Arago region of Oregon. Oregon State College. OCLC 1037965.
- Sanborn, Ethel I (1935). The Comstock flora of west central Oregon. Carnegie institution of Washington. OCLC 37934483.
- Sanborn, Ethel I; Potbury, Susan S; MacGinitie, H. D (1937). Eocene flora of western America. Carnegie Institution of Washington. OCLC 3232770.
