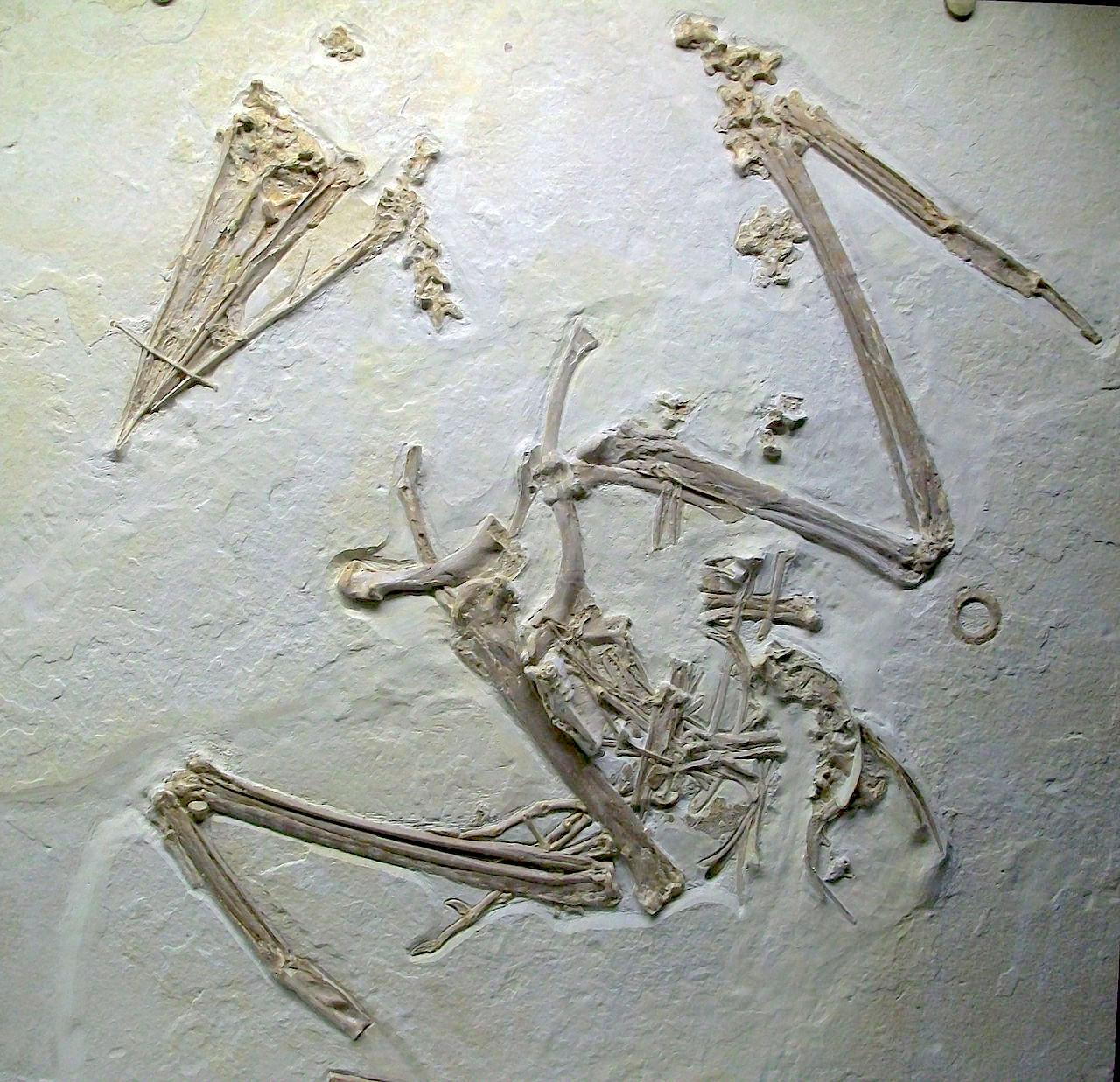
- Skeleton of L. azygosternon in the Field Museum of Natural History.

Scientific classification
- Kingdom: Animalia
- Phylum: Chordata
- Class: Aves
- Order: Suliformes
- Family: Fregatidae
- Subfamily: †Limnofregatinae; Olson, 1977
- Genus: †Limnofregata; Olson, 1977

Type species
- Limnofregata azygosternon Olson, 1977

Other species
- †L. hasegawai Olson and Matsuoka, 2005; †L. hutchisoni Stidham, 2015

= Limnofregata =

Limnofregata Temporal range: Early Eocene

Extinct genus of birds

Limnofregata ("Freshwater frigatebird") is an extinct genus of primitive frigatebird. The two known species were described after fossils from the Early Eocene Green River Formation (c. 49 million years ago) of Wyoming. A number of good complete and partial skeletons, some with feather impressions, are known of the type species, Limnofregata azygosternon, and L. hasegawai is known from two skulls and most of one torso.

== Description ==
Birds of the genus Limnofregata resembled modern frigatebirds, but had shorter less-hooked bills and longer legs, and longer slitlike nasal openings. They stood 30 to 40 centimetres (12 to 16 in) tall when on the ground and had a wingspan of about 100 to 120 centimetres (3 to 4 ft). The beak was shorter than that of modern frigatebirds, and lacked the typical hook at the end, resembling a strong booby beak more than that of today's frigatebirds. The species differ conspicuously in size, with L. hasegawai being as much larger when compared to L. azygosternon as today's largest species of frigatebird (Fregata magnificens) is compared to the smallest extant one (Fregata ariel). The bill of L. hasegawai was notably larger still than that of its congener, whereas its feet were smaller, echoing a pattern found in the extant Fregata species.

In 2014, a third species, Limnofregata hutchisoni, was described from the Wasatch Formation, 2 million years older than the Green River Formation. Though the only remains are a coracoid and a humerus, these bones clearly identify it as part of the genus. It is of comparable size to F. magnificens. It is at least 53 and possibly 54 or 55 million years old. The fossil beds have remains of crocodiles, large trionychid turtles and fish, indicating a sizeable body of water.

== Paleobiology ==
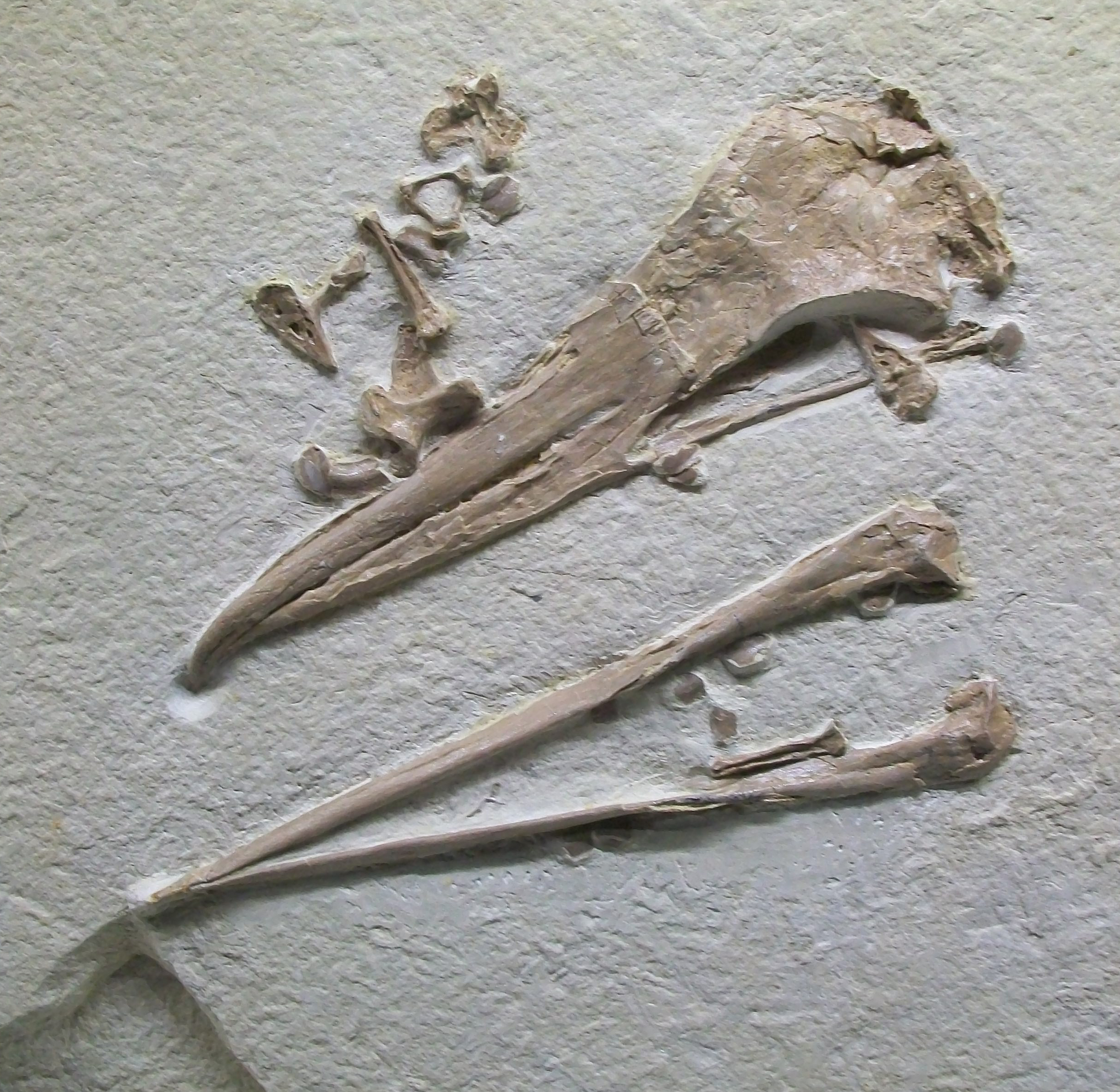
Skull of L. hasegawai in the Field Museum.

The Eocene frigatebird genus Limnofregata comprises birds whose fossil remains were recovered from prehistoric freshwater environments, unlike the marine preferences of their modern-day relatives. They are thought to have lived like gulls of the genus Larus, which is affirmed by the presence of longer legs for swimming. They inhabited the freshwater or brackish lakes that in time formed in today's Green River valley due to the uplift of the Rocky Mountains, feeding on smaller vertebrates and probably harassing other shorebirds for food and feasting on dead fish (e.g. Knightia) during summer dieoffs due to oxygen depletion in the eutrophic lakes. However, Limnofregata may have not been an exclusively non-marine bird, but rather an opportunistic aquatic bird that periodically visited freshwater ecosystems such as the Green River Formation to feed on dying fish.

Modern frigatebirds show pronounced sexual dimorphism in size, apparently to avoid competition due to different soaring behavior of male and female wings. As Limnofregata was most likely not a soaring bird, it can be expected that the sexes were much alike. It is not known if the males had a prominent throat balloon for advertising for mates as in their modern relatives, but Limnofregata throat bones differ markedly from those of modern frigatebirds.
