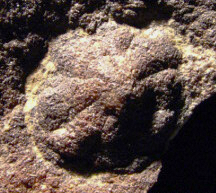

Scientific classification
- Kingdom: Animalia
- Phylum: incertae sedis
- Genus: †Conomedusites; Glaessner and Wade, 1966
- Species: †C. lobatus

Binomial name
- †Conomedusites lobatus Glaessner and Wade, 1966

= Conomedusites =

Conomedusites Temporal range: Ediacaran

Ediacaran animal

Conomedusites was a creature from the Ediacaran biota. The Ediacaran period ranged from 635 to 539 million years ago. Its fossil was first discovered in 1966 by Martin F. Glaessner and Mary Wade in South Australia. Conomedusites is believed to have been part of the phylum Cnidaria due to its similar structure to jellyfish and other cnidarians, but this is not known for certain. Conomedusites is thought to have been a stationary osmotroph.

== Morphology, anatomy, and behavior ==
Conomedusites is a tetraradial fossil, meaning that its body has four lobes. Conomedusites are described as a small convex body made up of four nearly equal lobes that are divided by sharpy defined grooves that deepen outwards, separating the lobes at the periphery, or above a broad, distorted, marginal flange with an entire margin. The four radial grooves are interpreted to be septal folds of the theca. Between the folds the peripheral margin is lobate, but in some specimens, particularly larger specimens, there is a tendency for further indentations to appear between the septal grooves so that there are eight lobes total. Each of these lobes are approximately equal. Some are even described to have a fringe of tentacles extending beyond the thecal margin. It is the only known medusoid fossil to display tetraradial symmetry and was soft bodied. The body is small and convex with grooves. The holotype has a diameter of 21-22mm and a height of 1-5mm. There is information on the aboral side of this fossil, however not the oral side. ^{]} It is hypothesized that Conomedusites were held up during their life by some sort of basal attachment in the sediment, as well as its buoyancy. These organisms appeared to live in communities, as many of the specimens occurred together in pairs on small rock slabs.

== Method of fossilization ==
In South Australia, fossilized Conomedusites were found in the lower surfaces of quartzite slabs and were preserved as casts.

== Distribution and paleoenvironment ==
The specimens were discovered in South Australia and are thought to have been deposited in a shallow marine environment, close to the shoreline. This location indicates that Conomedusites is an aquatic organism.

== Other notable characteristics ==
Conomedusites is a cnidarian with a theca that takes the form of a low cone. It shares a lot of similarities with Conchopeltis alternata, which is from the Middle Ordovician. However, it is distinguished by the absence of fine radial striation, and the presence of indistinct coarse concentric rugosities. These two organisms share the similar tendency to have strong tetrameral symmetry with four main radial grooves that can also be split into eight grooves.
