= Ralph Works Chaney =

American paleobotanist (1890–1971)

- Ralph W. Chaney
- Born: August 24, 1890; Brainerd, Illinois, U.S.
- Died: March 3, 1971 (aged 80); Berkeley, California, U.S.
- Education: University of Chicago
- Scientific career
- Workplaces: University of Iowa; University of California, Berkeley
- Author abbrev. (botany): R.W.Chaney

Ralph Works Chaney (August 24, 1890 – March 3, 1971) was an American paleobotanist. Chaney was the first paleobotanist to develop in detail the use of morphological characters of fossil leaves to deduce ecological information of the given era. He was also the first to use quantitative study of fossil floras in an attempt to arrive at a precise estimate of species dominance in vegetation, understanding that species in a given ecosystem evolve cooperatively.

== Early life ==
Chaney was born on August 24, 1890, in Brainerd, Illinois. He attended Hyde Park Academy High School, and began to cultivate his interest in ornithology. He became an avid bird watcher and collected a series of bird eggs and skins. After his graduation, Chaney briefly moved to South Dakota before enrolling at the University of Chicago in the fall of 1908. It was here where his interests shifted from ornithology to botany, and eventually paleobotany. He earned his B.S. degree in geology from the University of Chicago in 1912.

Chaney began to work towards a graduate degree in paleontology at the University of Chicago, studying under Stuart Weller. After two years, he found that he did not especially enjoy his Paleozoic studies.

== Career ==
=== Early career ===
In the summer of 1913, Chaney was hired as a cook by the U.S. Geological Survey and spent the summer months in the Matanuska Valley of Alaska. He was part of a team that was doing a topographic survey of the region. It was here where Chaney saw his first fossilized tree.

In 1914, he decided to take a job as head of the Science Department at the Frances W. Parker School in Chicago. He remained there until 1917, when he left to teach geology at the University of Iowa. He advanced from instructor to assistant professor before returning to the University of Chicago to resume his education. In 1919, Chaney earned his doctorate degree in geology. In 1920, Chaney was appointed Research Associate of the Carnegie Institution. He continued teaching at Iowa until 1922.

=== University of California ===
Following an invitation from John Campbell Merriam, Chaney took a position at the University of California, Berkeley while still continuing to do research for the Carnegie Institution. In 1925, he joined Roy Chapman Andrews' third Central Asiatic Expedition in Mongolia. Chaney joined as the expedition's paleobotanist under the recommendation of William Diller Matthew. He continued alone into Manchuria to collect additional specimens.

In 1931, Chaney was appointed professor of paleobotany and head of the Paleontology Department at the University of California, as well as curator of paleobotany at the Museum of Paleontology. He spent 1933 at the cave site of Zhoukoudian in the search for specimens of the "Peking Man" under the direction of Davidson Black. In 1937, Chaney worked for the China Geological Survey collecting Shanwang National Geological Park flora from the Miocene. In 1939, he served as president of the Paleontological Society of America

Following the breakout of World War II, Chaney contributed to the establishment of the Campus Catastrophe Relief Organization, a precursor to the Civil Defence Corps. He also volunteered as an aid in the Selective Service System by serving as Chairman of the University Area Draft Board. He had an important role in determining who was required at the university, and who could be drafted. In 1944, Chaney was appointed as assistant director of the Radiation Laboratory, which was undergoing research for the Manhattan Project.

Chaney returned to China in 1948 for the last time to study Metasequoia. Chaney sought out the region so that he could see if these trees were in fact living fossils. He confirmed that the middle Tertiary "Sequoia" fossils he'd been studying were actually the extant Metasequoia. He returned with seeds from the species, which were distributed worldwide to botanical gardens.

Chaney retired from the University of California in 1957, but remained with the institution. He was working with the Geological Survey of Japan and as a visiting professor with the National Taiwan University after his retirement, interested Tertiary floras of Japan and Taiwan.

== Awards and honors ==
- 1943 - elected member of the American Philosophical Society
- 1947 - elected member of the United States National Academy of Sciences
- 1956 - Botanical Society of America's Merit Award
- 1969 - U.S. Department of the Interior's Distinguished Service Award
- 1970 - Paleontological Society of America's Paleontological Society Medal

Works was active in issues of species conservation. A member of the Save the Redwoods League since the late 1920s, he became president of the organization from 1961 until his death in 1971.

== Selected publications ==
- (1910). A migration of Longspurs over Chicago on December 13, 1909. The Auk, 27(2):210-ll
- (1918). The ecological significance of the Eagle Creek flora of the Columbia River Gorge. J. Geol., 26(7):577-92
- (1924). Palaeontological researches. Carnegie Inst. Washington Yearb., 22(1923):349-50.
- (1926). Bearing of palaeobotany on habitat conditions in Mongolia. In: Important Results of the Central Asiatic Expeditions. Nat. Hist., 26(5):532.
- (1933). With Lyman H. Daugherty. The occurrence of Cercis associated with the remains of Sinanthropus. Geol. Soc. China Bull., 12(3):323-28
- (1940). Tertiary forests and continental history. Geol. Soc. Am. Bull., 51(3):469-88.
- (1951). A revision of fossil Sequoia and Taxodium in western North America based on the recent discovery of Metasequoia. Am. Philos. Soc. Trans., n.s. 40(3): 171–262.
- (1967). Preliminary notes on a middle Miocene flora from Taiwan. Geol. Soc. China Proc, 10:155-56.
