= 1966 in paleontology =

Paleontology or palaeontology is the study of prehistoric life forms on Earth through the examination of plant and animal fossils. This includes the study of body fossils, tracks (ichnites), burrows, cast-off parts, fossilised feces (coprolites), palynomorphs and chemical residues. Because humans have encountered fossils for millennia, paleontology has a long history both before and after becoming formalized as a science. This article records significant discoveries and events related to paleontology that occurred or were published in the year 1966.

== Arthropods ==
=== Newly named Insects ===
| Name | Novelty | Status | Authors | Age | Unit | Location | Notes | Images |
|---|---|---|---|---|---|---|---|---|
| Oligomyrmex antiqua | Comb nov | jr synonym | (Mayr, 1868) | Middle Eocene | Baltic amber | Europe | Fossil myrmicine ant, moved to Carebara antiqua in 2004 | Carebara antiqua |
| Sphecomyrminae | Subfam. Gen. et sp. nov | Valid | Wilson & Carpenter | Turonian | New Jersey Amber | USA | Basal most ant subfamily. One genus Sphecomyrma | |

== Conodonts ==
| Name | Novelty | Status | Authors | Age | Unit | Location | Notes | Images |
|---|---|---|---|---|---|---|---|---|
| Declinognathodus | Gen. nov | Valid | David L. Dunn | Pennsylvanian | | USA | | |

== Anapsids ==
=== Newly named mesosaurs ===
| Name | Novelty | Status | Authors | Age | Unit | Location | Notes | Images |
|---|---|---|---|---|---|---|---|---|
| Brazilosaurus | Gen. et sp. | Valid | Shikama & Ozaki | Artinskian | Irati Formation | Brazil | A mesosaur. | |

== Dinosaurs ==
=== Newly named dinosaurs ===
Data courtesy of George Olshevsky's dinosaur genera list.

| Name | Novelty | Status | Authors | Age | Unit | Location | Notes | Images |
|---|---|---|---|---|---|---|---|---|
| Probactrosaurus | Gen et sp nov | Valid | Rozhdestvensky | Early Cretaceous (Albian) | Dashuigou Formation | China | | Probactrosaurus |

=== Newly named birds ===
| Name | Novelty | Status | Authors | Age | Unit | Location | Notes | Images |
|---|---|---|---|---|---|---|---|---|
| Arikarornis macdonaldi | Gen et sp nov. | valid | Howard | Early Miocene | Middle Sharps Formation | USA | An Accipitrid, type species A. macdonaldi | |
| Miortyx aldeni | Sp. nov. | valid | Howard | Early Miocene | Middle Sharps Formation | USA | An Odontophoridae. | |
| Diomedea milleri | Sp. nov. | valid | Howard | Middle Miocene | Temblor Formation | USA | A Diomedeid. | |
| Dissourodes milleri | Gen et sp. nov. | jr synonym of Mycteria milleri | Short | Early Pliocene | Valentine Formation | USA | | |
| Pelecanus tirarensis | Sp. nov. | valid | Miller | Miocene | Etadunna Formation | Australia | A Pelecanidae. | |
| Praemancalla | Gen et sp. nov. | valid | Howard | Late Miocene | Laguna Hills Formation | USA | An Alcidae, Mancallinae, type species P. lagunensis | |
| Speotyto megalopeza | Sp. nov. | Jr synonym of Athene megalopeza | Ford | Late Pliocene | Rexroad Formation | USA | | |
| Wasonaka | Gen et sp. nov. | valid | Howard | Middle Pliocene | Arroyo de las Barrancas Blancas | Mexico | An Anatidae, Type species W. yepormerae | |

== Other animals ==
| Name | Novelty | Status | Authors | Age | Unit | Location | Notes | Images |
|---|---|---|---|---|---|---|---|---|
| Arborea | Gen. et comb. nov | Valid | Glaessner & Wade | Ediacaran | | Australia | The type species is "Rangea" arborea Glaessner (1959). | |
| Conomedusites | Gen. et sp. nov | Valid | Glaessner & Wade | Ediacaran | | Australia | The type species is C. lobatus. | |
| Dickinsonia elongata | Sp. nov | Synonym of Dickinsonia costata | Glaessner & Wade | Ediacaran | | Australia | | |
| Dickinsonia tenuis | Sp. nov | Valid | Glaessner & Wade | Ediacaran | | Australia Russia | | |
| Kimberia | Gen. et sp. nov | Junior homonym | Glaessner & Wade | Ediacaran | | Australia | The type species is K. quadrata. Wade (1972) coined a replacement name Kimberella. | |
| Lorenzinites | Gen. et sp. nov | | Glaessner & Wade | Ediacaran | | Australia | The type species is L. rarus. | |
| Mawsonites | Gen. et sp. nov | Valid | Glaessner & Wade | Ediacaran | | Australia | The type species is M. spriggi. | |
| Medusinites | Gen. et comb. nov | Valid | Glaessner & Wade | Ediacaran | | Australia | The type species is "Medusina" asteroides Sprigg (1949). | |
| Ovatoscutum | Gen. et sp. nov | Valid | Glaessner & Wade | Ediacaran | | Australia | The type species is O. concentricum. | |
| Praecambridium | Gen. et sp. nov | Valid | Glaessner & Wade | Ediacaran | | Australia | The type species is P. sigillum. | |
| Rangea grandis | Sp. nov | Synonym of Charnia masoni | Glaessner & Wade | Ediacaran | | Australia | | |
| Rangea longa | Sp. nov | Valid | Glaessner & Wade | Ediacaran | | Australia | Originally described as a species of Rangea; Grimes et al. (2023) transferred it to the genus Akrophyllas. | |
| Rugoconites | Gen. et sp. nov | Valid | Glaessner & Wade | Ediacaran | | Australia | The type species is R. enigmaticus. | |
| Spriggina? elongata | Sp. nov | Valid | Glaessner & Wade | Ediacaran | | Australia | Originally described as a species of Spriggina; Glaessner (1976) transferred it to the genus Marywadea. | |
