= Precursor (bird) =

"Precursor" Temporal range: Ypresian

Scientific classification
- Kingdom: Animalia
- Phylum: Chordata
- Class: Aves
- Superorder: Neoaves
- Order: see text
- Genus: "Precursor" Harrison & Walker, 1977

Species
- "Precursor" parvus Harrison & Walker, 1977 (type); "Precursor" litorhinus Harrison & Walker, 1977; "Precursor" magnus Harrison & Walker, 1977; but see text

Possible extinct genus of birds

"Precursor" is a controversial prehistoric bird genus from the Early Eocene. It was established based on fossils found in England, including in the famous London Clay deposits. Three species are included in the genus: "P." parvus, the type species, "P." magnus, and "P." litorum, all named by Colin Harrison and Cyril Walker in 1977.

These remains were originally considered to be members of the Charadriiformes, more specifically the earliest representatives of the Glareolidae (pratincoles and coursers). However, several authors have since found this interpretation to be dubious, with the lack of measurements and contradictory wording making the original description's conclusions difficult to verify. At least some of the material, namely the paratype humerus of "P." parvus, has been re-interpreted as belonging to the Pseudasturidae (or Halcyornithidae), a group of stem-parrots, the remains of which (including a complete skeleton) were found in the Green River Formation in the United States.
