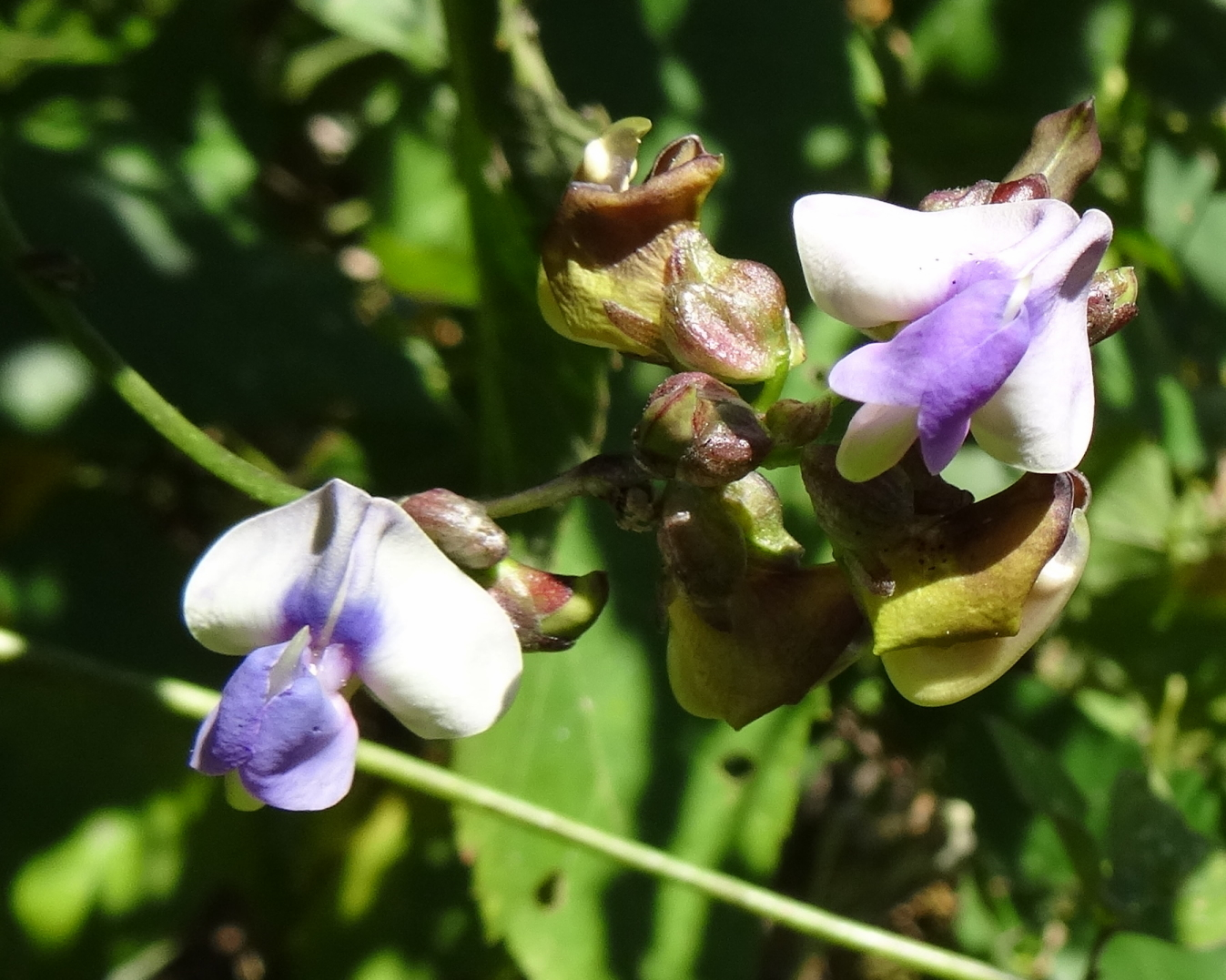
- Dolichos sp.

Scientific classification
- Kingdom: Plantae
- Clade: Tracheophytes
- Clade: Angiosperms
- Clade: Eudicots
- Clade: Rosids
- Order: Fabales
- Family: Fabaceae
- Subfamily: Faboideae
- Subtribe: Phaseolinae
- Genus: Dolichos; L.

Species
- about 60, see text

Synonyms
- Chloryllis E.Mey. 1836

= Dolichos (plant) =

Genus of legumes

Dolichos is a genus of flowering plants in the legume family, Fabaceae, and the subfamily Faboideae. It is distributed in Africa and Asia.

== Description ==
These are herbs and shrubs growing upright, sometimes with climbing stems, or spreading prostrate upon the ground. They have woody rhizomes. The leaves have single blades or are pinnate, divided into three leaflets. The plants sometimes produce their leaves after flowering. The flowers are solitary or in racemes with more than one flower. The flowers are white or purple, or occasionally yellow. The fruit is a flattened legume pod.

The plants' general form, annual stems sprouting from a large perennial rootstock, is thought to be adapted to habitat prone to seasonal wildfire.

Some of the species grow to heights of 30 feet. The average Dolichos is between 5 and 10 feet high.

== Species ==
There are about 60 species.

Species include:

- Dolichos aciphyllus
- Dolichos angustifolius
- Dolichos angustissimus
- Dolichos antunesii
- Dolichos argyros
- Dolichos axilliflorus
- Dolichos bellus
- Dolichos bianoensis
- Dolichos brevidentatus
- Dolichos capensis
- Dolichos cardiophyllus
- Dolichos complanatus
- Dolichos compressus
- Dolichos corymbosus
- Dolichos decumbens
- Dolichos dinklagei
- Dolichos dongaluta
- Dolichos elatus
- Dolichos falciformis
- Dolichos fangitsa
- Dolichos filifoliolus
- Dolichos formosanus
- Dolichos fragrans
- Dolichos glabratus
- Dolichos glabrescens
- Dolichos grandistipulatus
- Dolichos gululu
- Dolichos hastiformis
- Dolichos homblei
- Dolichos ichthyophone
- Dolichos junghuhnianus
- Dolichos karaviaensis
- Dolichos katali
- Dolichos kilimandscharicus Taub.
- Dolichos linearifolius
- Dolichos linearis
- Dolichos longipes
- Dolichos lualabensis
- Dolichos luticola
- Dolichos magnificus
- Dolichos mendoncae
- Dolichos minutiflorus
- Dolichos nimbaensis
- Dolichos oliveri Schweinf.
- Dolichos peglerae
- Dolichos petiolatus
- Dolichos pratensis
- Dolichos pseudocajanus
- Dolichos pseudocomplanatus
- Dolichos quarrei
- Dolichos reptans
- Dolichos rhombifolius
- Dolichos schweinfurthii
- Dolichos sericeus
- Dolichos sericophyllus
- Dolichos serpens
- Dolichos simplicifolius
- Dolichos smilacinus
- Dolichos splendens
- Dolichos staintonii
- Dolichos subcapitatus
- Dolichos tenuicaulis
- Dolichos thorelii
- Dolichos tonkouiensis
- Dolichos trilobus
- Dolichos trinervatus Baker
- Dolichos ungoniensis
- Dolichos xiphophyllus
- Dolichos zovuanyi
