= Sepulcher Formation =

Geological Formation

- Stratigraphic range: Paleogene
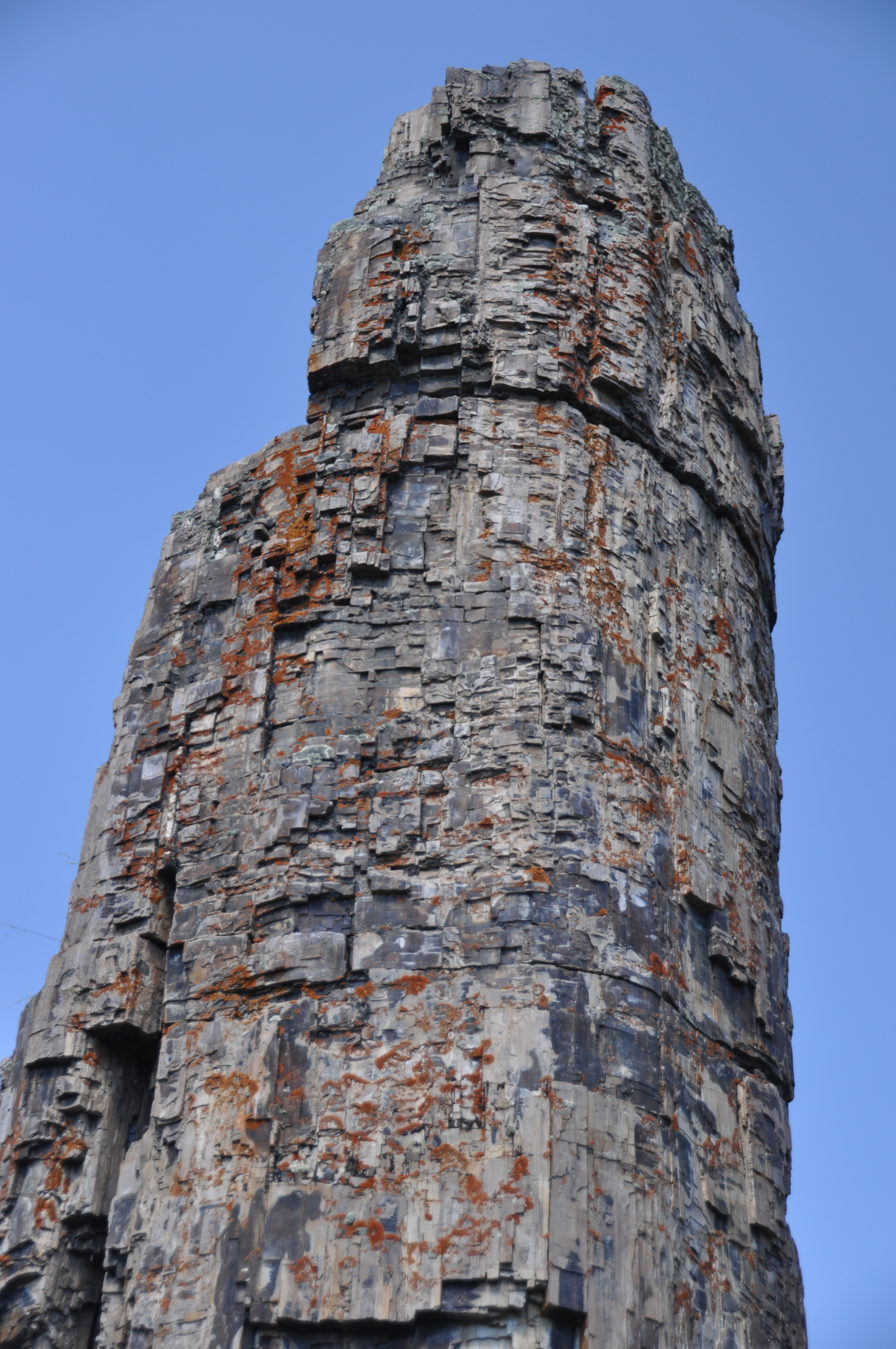
- Fossil redwood tree trunk from the Sepulcher Formation
- Type: Formation
- Unit of: Washburn Group

Location
- Region: Wyoming
- Country: United States

The Sepulcher Formation is a geologic formation in Wyoming. It preserves fossils dating back to the Paleogene period.

== See also ==
- List of fossiliferous stratigraphic units in Wyoming
- Paleontology in Wyoming
