= George MacGinitie =

American marine biologist

George Eber MacGinitie (5 April 1889 – 6 September 1989) was an American marine biologist and a professor at the California Institute of Technology. He married the marine biologist Nettie Murray MacGinitie and the couple conducted research together and helped produce films on marine life.

MacGinitie was born in Sparta, Nebraska to Laura Ella (McElhany) and John Maurice MacGinitie. He went to graduate AB at Fresno State College where his older brother, the paleobotanist Harry Dunlap MacGinitie (1896-1987) also went to. In 1926 he moved to Stanford University for his master's and began to study the shores of Monterey Bay and his thesis on Ecological aspects of Elkhorn Slough was produced in 1927. He married Nettie Lorene Murray, another marine biologist on 19 February 1927 at Fresno and they conducted research together. In 1929 he became an instructor at the Hopkins Marine Station. He conducted field instruction courses on marine biology and later joined the Kerckhoff Marine Laboratory. Between 1948 and 1950 he and his wife worked at Point Barrow in Alaska. In 1949 the couple published Natural History of Marine Animals. In 1954, they helped the Walt Disney production of 20,000 leagues under the sea.

He wrote The not so gay nineties in 1972 about growing up in Nebraska, and along with his wife he wrote a children's book, The Wild World of George and Nettie MacGinitie in 1974.
