= 1952 in paleontology =

Paleontology or palaeontology is the study of prehistoric life forms on Earth through the examination of plant and animal fossils. This includes the study of body fossils, tracks (ichnites), burrows, cast-off parts, fossilised feces (coprolites), palynomorphs and chemical residues. Because humans have encountered fossils for millennia, paleontology has a long history both before and after becoming formalized as a science. This article records significant discoveries and events related to paleontology that occurred or were published in the year 1952.

== Archosauromorphs ==
=== Dinosaurs ===
Name	Novelty	Status	Authors	Age	Type locality	Location	Notes	Images
Saurolophus angustirostris	Sp. nov.	Valid	Rozhdestvensky	Maastrichtian	Nemegt Formation	Mongolia	A species of Saurolophus	
Syrmosaurus viminocaudus	Gen. et sp. nov.	Jr. synonym	Maleev	Campanian	Djadochta Formation	Mongolia	Junior synonym of Pinacosaurus	
Talarurus plicatospineus	Gen. et sp. nov.	Valid	Maleev	Cenomanian-Santonian	Bayan Shireh Formation	Mongolia	An ankylosaurid	

== Plesiosaurs ==
=== New taxa ===
Name	Novelty	Status	Authors	Age	Unit	Location	Notes	Images
Alzadasaurus kansasensis	Sp nov	jr synonym	Welles	Late Cretaceous; Early Campanian	Niobrara Formation	USA; Kansas	A long-necked elasmosaurid plesiosaur. Synonymized with Styxosaurus snowii in 1999	Styxosaurus snowii
Styxosaurus browni	Sp nov	valid	Welles	Late Cretaceous; Early Campanian	Pierre Shale	USA; Wyoming	A long-necked elasmosaurid plesiosaur. Synonymized with Hydralmosaurus serpentinus in 1999; Removed from synonymy in 2016	Styxosaurus browni
