= Nettie MacGinitie =

American marine biologist

Nettie Lorene Murray MacGinitie
- Born: February 27, 1899; Falls City, Polk County, Oregon, U.S.
- Died: June 16, 1993 (aged 94)
- Education: Oregon State College
- Known for: Studies of marine animals and mollusks; films and books on marine life
- Notable work: Natural History of Marine Animals (1949)
- Spouse: George MacGinitie
- Children: Walter Harold MacGinitie
- Scientific career
- Fields: Marine biology, Malacology
- Workplaces: Kerckhoff Marine Laboratory

Nettie Lorene Murray MacGinitie (February 27, 1899 – June 16, 1993) was an American marine biologist and malacologist. She served as director of the Kerckhoff Marine Laboratory from 1957 to 1959, and with her husband, George MacGinitie, contributed to marine biology research, education, and public understanding of marine life through books and films.

== Early life and education ==
Nettie Lorene Murray was born in Falls City, Polk County, Oregon, to Catherina Kurz and Lindley Byron Murray. She grew up on a homestead and later attended Oregon State College.

In the summer of 1925, during a session at the Hopkins Marine Station of Stanford University, she met George MacGinitie at a tidepool. The two married in 1927.

== Career ==
From 1932 to 1957, George MacGinitie directed the Kerckhoff Marine Laboratory in Corona del Mar, California, after which Nettie succeeded him as director from 1957 to 1959.

Together, the MacGinities participated in a U.S. Navy marine research program at Point Barrow, Alaska, where Nettie described numerous mollusk species collected during the expedition.

== Publications and film work ==
The MacGinities coauthored the book Natural History of Marine Animals, first published in 1949, which became a widely used reference in marine biology. In 1974, they wrote the children’s book The Wild World of George and Nettie MacGinitie.

Nettie also assisted in the production of several educational films about marine life, including Secrets of Life (1956), Mysteries of the Deep (1959), and the Walt Disney production of 20,000 Leagues Under the Sea (1954). Their research and outreach efforts influenced conservation work at Elkhorn Slough.

== Personal life ==
Nettie and George MacGinitie had one son, Walter Harold MacGinitie, who became a specialist in reading and literacy testing and co-developed the Gates–MacGinitie Reading Test.

Nettie MacGinitie died on June 16, 1993.
