= Harry MacGinitie =

Harry Dunlap MacGinitie
- Born: 29 March 1896; Lynch, Nebraska
- Died: 31 January 1987 (aged 90); Napa, California
- Education: University of California, Berkeley
- Known for: Florissant Fossil Beds National Monument,
- Scientific career
- Fields: Paleobotany
- Workplaces: Carnegie Institution, Humboldt State University, US Army Corps meteorology

Harry Dunlap MacGinitie (29 March 1896 – 31 January 1987) was an American paleobotanist. The fossil plant genus Macginitiea is named after him.

MacGinitie was born in Lynch, Nebraska to Laura Ella McElhaney and John Maurice MacGinitie (originally as "McGuintie") I (1850-1933). He went to high school in Sturgis and then went to Fresno State College to receive an A.B. in 1926. His brother George Eber MacGinitie went on to study marine biology. He studied briefly at Stanford University and then taught at a high school before joining Humboldt State College, Arcata in 1928, working there until 1960. In between, he worked on his PhD at the University of California, Berkeley receiving his doctorate in 1935. He married Beatrice Hess on February 2, 1935. He taught the US Army Corps meteorology between 1943 and 1945. He worked as a research associate at the Carnegie Institution of Washington and after retirement he worked at the California Museum of Paleontology. He died at Napa.

MacGinitie was a specialist on fossil plants and worked on the Eocene flora of the Central Sierra Nevada, Miocene flora of the Columbia plateau, Eocene Chalk Bluffs, and the Florissant Beds. He collaborated with Estella Leopold and helped in the establishment of the Florissant Fossil Beds National Monument.
