= Kulthieth Formation =

Geologic formation in Yukon, Canada

- Stratigraphic range: Paleogene
- Type: Formation
- Sub-units: Burls Creek Shale Member

Location
- Region: Yukon
- Country: Canada

The Kulthieth Formation is a geologic formation in the Yukon and coastal southern Alaska. The former Kushtaka formation is considered an extension of the Kulthieth Formation It preserves fossils dating back to the late Paleocene though the Early Oligocene periods.

== See also ==
- List of fossiliferous stratigraphic units in Yukon
