= Arthur Hollick =

American paleobotanist (1857–1933)

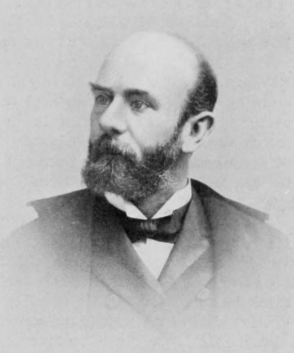
- Born: Charles Arthur Hollick; February 6, 1857; New Brighton, New York, US
- Died: March 11, 1933 (aged 76); New York, New York, US
- Education: Columbia School of Mines; George Washington University
- Occupation: Paleobotanist

Charles Arthur Hollick (February 6, 1857 – March 11, 1933), known widely as Arthur Hollick, was an American paleobotanist. He was curator of fossil plants at Columbia University and the New York Botanical Garden.

== Biography ==
Arthur Hollick was born in New Brighton, New York on February 6, 1857. He received a Bachelor of Philosophy from Columbia School of Mines in 1879 and his doctorate at George Washington University (then known as Columbian College) in 1897.

He died in New York City on March 11, 1933.

The standard author abbreviation Hollick is used to indicate this person as the author when citing a botanical name.
