= 1823 in science =

List of years in science	(table)
- … 1813; 1814; 1815; 1816; 1817; 1818; 1819; 1820; 1821; 1822; 1823; 1824; 1825; 1826; 1827; 1828; 1829; 1830; 1831; 1832; 1833 …
- Art; Archaeology; Architecture; Literature; Music; Philosophy; Science; +...

The year 1823 in science and technology involved some significant events, listed below.

== Astronomy ==
- Olbers' paradox is described by the German astronomer Heinrich Wilhelm Matthäus Olbers.
- Cambridge Observatory established in England.
- December 29 – Great Comet of 1823 first observed.

== Chemistry ==
- June 17 – Charles Macintosh patents a method of rubberizing fabric to waterproof it.

== Exploration ==
- February 20 – James Weddell's expedition to Antarctica reaches latitude 74°15' S and longitude 34°16'45" W, the most southerly position that will be attained for more than 80 years.

== Mathematics ==
- János Bolyai completes a treatise on parallel lines that he calls absolute geometry, although it will not be published until 1832.

== Medicine ==
- After August – Philipp Franz von Siebold begins to introduce Western medicine to Japan.
- October 5 – The Lancet founded by Thomas Wakley.
- Theodric Romeyn Beck publishes the first significant American book on forensic medicine, Elements of Medical Jurisprudence in Albany, New York.

== Paleontology ==
- January 23 – In a cave on the Gower Peninsula of Wales, William Buckland inspects the "Red Lady of Paviland", the first identification of a prehistoric (male) human burial. The bones, discovered on December 21 last, are with those of the woolly mammoth, proving that the two had coexisted, although Buckland dates th human remains as Roman.
- December 10 – On the Jurassic Coast of southern England, Mary Anning finds the first complete Plesiosaurus skeleton.

== Physics ==
- William Sturgeon invents the electromagnet.

== Technology ==
- December 6 – English inventor Samuel Brown obtains his first patent for a hydrogen fuelled compressionless atmospheric gas vacuum engine, the first internal combustion engine to be applied industrially.
- First use of a Fresnel lens in a lighthouse optic, at the Cordouan lighthouse on the Gironde estuary.
- First permanent wire cable suspension bridge, Pont Saint Antoine in Geneva, by Guillaume Henri Dufour, of two 40 m spans.
- First cast iron framed greenhouse erected at Wollaton Park in England as a Camellia house.
- French officer Henri-Joseph Paixhans develops the Paixhans gun, the first naval artillery to fire explosive shells.

== Publications ==
- Annals of the New York Academy of Sciences first published.

== Awards ==
- Copley Medal: John Pond

== Births ==
- January 3 – Robert Whitehead (died 1905), English inventor of the self-propelled torpedo.
- January 8 – Alfred Russel Wallace (died 1913), British naturalist who devises the theory of natural selection at the same time as Charles Darwin.
- February 3 – Spencer Fullerton Baird (died 1887), American ornithologist and ichthyologist.
- March 21 – Jules Émile Planchon (died 1888), French botanist.
- December 22 – Jean Henri Fabre (died 1915), French entomologist.
- December 23 – Thomas W. Evans (died 1897), American-born dentist.

== Deaths ==
- January 26 – Edward Jenner (born 1749), English inventor of vaccine.
- January 27 – Charles Hutton (born 1737), English mathematician.
- February 9 – Agnes Ibbetson (born 1757), English plant physiologist.
- September 23 – Matthew Baillie (born 1761), British pathologist.
