= 1819 in science =

List of years in science	(table)
- … 1809; 1810; 1811; 1812; 1813; 1814; 1815; 1816; 1817; 1818; 1819; 1820; 1821; 1822; 1823; 1824; 1825; 1826; 1827; 1828; 1829 …
- Art; Archaeology; Architecture; Literature; Music; Philosophy; Science; +...

The year 1819 in science and technology involved some significant events, listed below.

== Astronomy and space science ==
- Johann Franz Encke computes the orbit of Comet Encke, identifying it as periodic.
- July 1 – Johann Georg Tralles discovers the Great Comet of 1819, (C/1819 N1). It is the first comet analyzed using polarimetry, by François Arago.

== Chemistry ==
- Joseph Bienaimé Caventou and Pierre Joseph Pelletier isolate the alkaloid brucine from Strychnos nux-vomica.

== Exploration ==
- February 19 – Captain William Smith in British merchant brig Williams sights Williams Point, the northeast extremity of Livingston Island in the South Shetlands, the first land discovered south of latitude 60° S.
- October 15 – Desolation Island in the South Shetland Islands of the Antarctic is discovered by Captain William Smith in the Williams.
- A British Arctic expedition under William Edward Parry comprising HMS Hecla and HMS Griper reaches longitude 112°51' W in the Northwest Passage, the furthest west which will be attained by any single-season voyage for 150 years.

== Geology ==
- G. B. Greenough publishes his book A critical examination of the first principles of geology in a series of essays in London.

== Medicine ==
- August – René Laennec publishes De l’Auscultation Médiate ou Traité du Diagnostic des Maladies des Poumons et du Coeur in Paris, describing his invention of the stethoscope.
- English physician John Bostock publishes the first account of allergic rhinitis (in himself).
- French physician Pierre Amable Jean-Baptiste Trannoy publishes one of the first epidemiology treatises in France: Traité élémentaire des maladies épidémiques ou populaires à l'usage des officiers de santé (Elementary Treatise on Epidemic or Popular Diseases for the use of health officers).

== Technology ==
- May 22 – SS Savannah leaves port at Savannah, Georgia on a voyage to become the first steamship to cross the Atlantic Ocean, although only a fraction of the trip is made under steam. The ship arrives at Liverpool, England, on June 20.
- Invention of the M1819 breech-loading flintlock using interchangeable parts by Captain John H. Hall of Harpers Ferry Armory in the United States.

== Institutions ==
- Cambridge Philosophical Society founded as a scientific society at the University of Cambridge in England.

== Awards ==
- Copley Medal: Not awarded

== Births ==
- March 24 – Friedrich Theodor von Frerichs (died 1885), German medical pathologist.
- May 3 (O.S. April 21) – Nikolai Annenkov (died 1889), Russian botanist.
- June 5 – John Couch Adams (died 1892), Cornish-born mathematician and astronomer.
- July 17 – Eunice Newton Foote (died 1888), American physicist and women's rights campaigner.
- July 28 – Thomas Evans Blackwell (died 1863), English civil and hydraulic engineer.
- August 9 – William T. G. Morton (died 1868), American dentist.
- August 13 – George Gabriel Stokes (died 1903), Irish-born mathematician and physicist.
- September 18 – Léon Foucault (died 1868), French physicist.
- September 23 – Hippolyte Fizeau (died 1896), French physicist.

== Deaths ==
- January – Elsa Beata Bunge (born 1734), Swedish botanist
- August 19 – James Watt (born 1736), Scottish inventor, mechanical engineer and mathematician
- November 22 – John Stackhouse (born 1742), English botanist
