= 1747 in science =

List of years in science	(table)
- … 1737; 1738; 1739; 1740; 1741; 1742; 1743; 1744; 1745; 1746; 1747; 1748; 1749; 1750; 1751; 1752; 1753; 1754; 1755; 1756; 1757 …
- Art; Archaeology; Architecture; Literature; Music; Philosophy; Science; +...

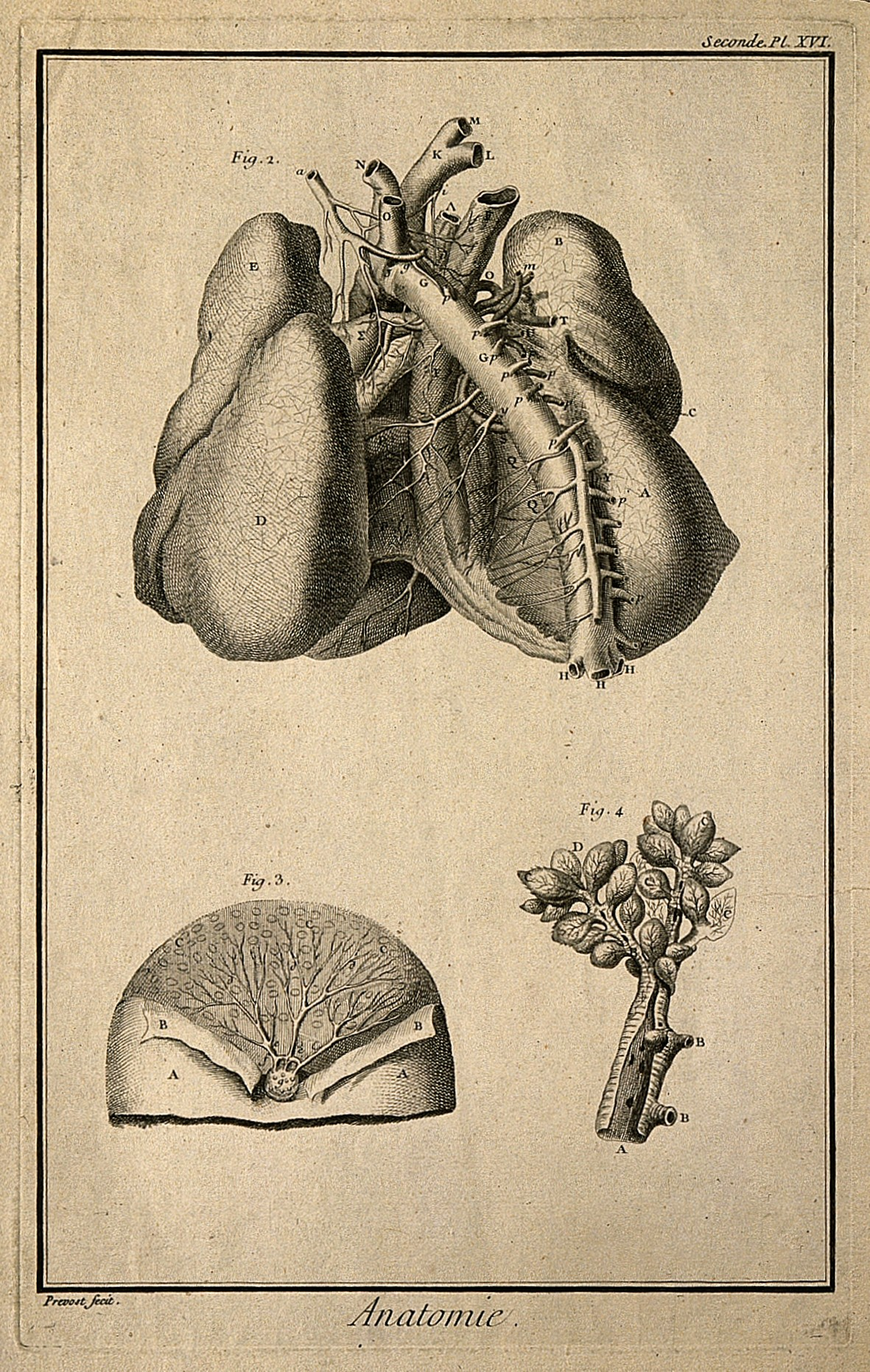

The year 1747 in science and technology involved some significant events.

== Anatomy ==
- Bernhard Siegfried Albinus (1697–1770), with the help of the artist Jan Wandelaar (1691–1759), produces the most exact account of the bones and muscles of the human body in Tabulae Sceleti et Musculorum Corporis Humani.
- Albrecht von Haller publishes Experiments in the Anatomy of Respiration.

== Engineering ==
- École royale des ponts et chaussées established in Paris under Jean-Rodolphe Perronet.

== Exploration ==
- June 24 – October 14 – The English ships Dobbs galley and California, under Captains William Moore and Francis Smith, explore Hudson Bay, discovering there is no Northwest Passage by this route.

== Mathematics ==
- Jean le Rond d'Alembert uses partial differential equations in mathematical physics.

== Medicine ==
- January 1 - In France: Ordonnance du roi, portant règlement général concernant les hôpitaux militaires — Order of the king Louis XV, laying down general regulations concerning military hospitals.
- January 31 – The first venereal diseases clinic opens at London Lock Hospital.
- James Lind undertakes one of the first controlled experiments in clinical medicine, on the effect of citrus fruit as a cure for scurvy.

== Physics ==
- July 2 – Benjamin Robins presents a paper to the Royal Society describing the physics of a spinning projectile following his investigation of rifle barrels.

== Awards ==
- Copley Medal: Gowin Knight

== Births ==
- January 17 - Markus Herz, German physician (died 1803)
- January 19 – Johann Elert Bode, German astronomer (died 1826)
- March 11 – William Curtis, English botanist and entomologist (died 1799)
- May 4 - Philippe-Jean Pelletan, French surgeon (died 1829)
- June 23 - Michele Troja, Italian physician (died 1827)
- November 23 – Baron Sigmund Zois von Edelstein (Baron von Zois), Slovenian geologist after whom zoisite is named (died 1819)
- December 8 - Clément Joseph Tissot, French physician (died 1826).

== Deaths ==
- April 2 – Johann Jacob Dillenius, German botanist, botanical artist, and physician who studied and produced several papers on cryptogams (lower plants that do not have seeds or flowers), such as mosses and algae (born 1687)
- August 8 – Mårten Triewald, Swedish mechanical engineer (born 1691)
- Johann Heinrich von Heucher, German botanist, after whom the genus heuchera is named (born 1677)
