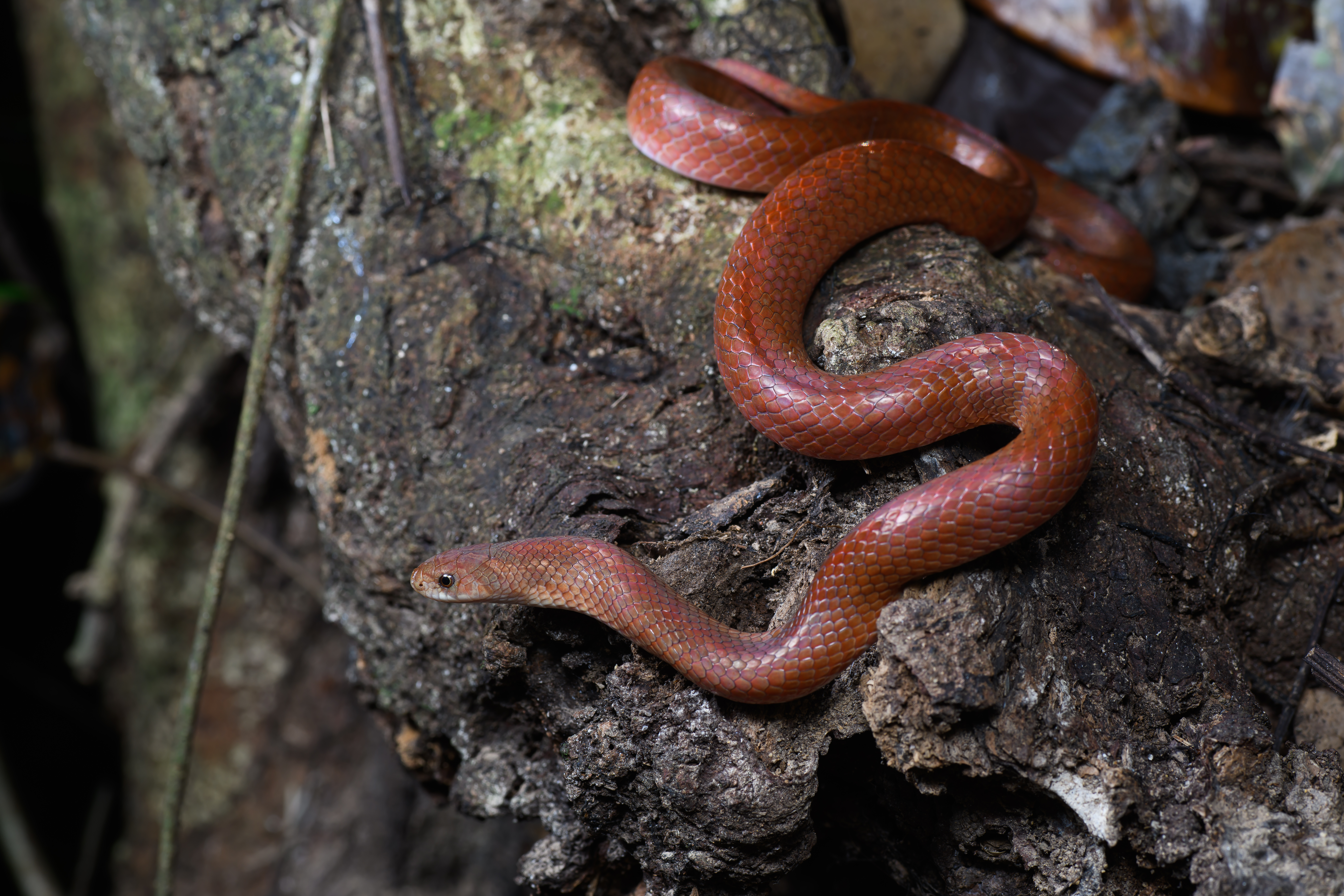

Scientific classification
- Kingdom: Animalia
- Phylum: Chordata
- Class: Reptilia
- Order: Squamata
- Suborder: Serpentes
- Family: Colubridae
- Genus: Oligodon
- Species: O. huahin

Binomial name
- Oligodon huahin Pauwels, Larsen, Suthanthangjai, David & Sumontha, 2017

= Oligodon huahin =

Species of snake

Oligodon huahin, the Hua Hin kukri snake, is a species of kukri snakes in the genus Oligodon (Fitzinger, 1826). The species was first discovered and described in late 2016, and the article was published July 13, 2017. It is only known from its type locality but its range is likely to be more extensive. O. huahin is thought to be very secretive, similar to other species of the genus Oligodon. This theory is supported by the type specimen, which all were males, suggesting that it was found during the mating season where males are out and actively search for females to reproduce. This may also explain why this species had not yet been discovered

== Phylogeny ==
Oligodon huahin is a member of the genus Oligodon, a genus common throughout central and tropical Asia. It belongs to the snake family Colubridae, the largest snake family, with member species to be found on every continent, except Antarctica.

== Etymology ==
The specific epithet is an invariable noun in honor of the administrative district where the type locality lies and of its charming main city Hua Hin. O. huahin is the first species of snake endemic to Hua Hin District, Prachuap Khiri Khan Province, Thailand. The following common names are suggested "Hua Hin Kukri Snake" (English), "Ngu Ngod Hua Hin" «งูงอดหัวหิน» or "Ngu Peekeaw Hua Hin" «งูปี่แก้วหัวหิน» (Thai), "Oligodon de Hua Hin" (French), "Hua Hin Kukrinatter" (German) and Hua Hin kukrislange" (Norwegian)

== Habitat, behaviour, ecology and syntopy ==
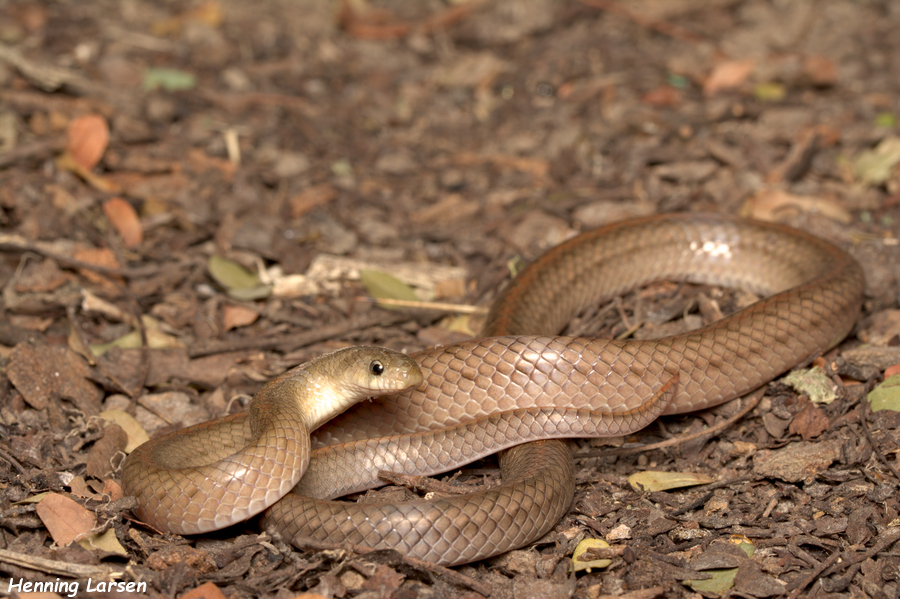
The first located specimen. Paratype: QSMI 1502 Observer and photographer: Henning Larsen

The habitat, behaviour and ecology of this species is poorly known. All type specimens used for the species description were found in a moist mixed bamboo forest area with a forest stream. This type of habitat is excellent for a broad range of species with a rich species diversity of both amphibians and reptiles. Based on data for other members of the genus Oligodon, O. huahin is thought to be an oviparous (egg-laying) species, as it is not observed any viviparity (giving live birth) among any species within this genus. This species is nocturnal. Other species observed in the syntopy are as follows:

- Reptiles
  - Lizards
    - (Agamidae)
      - Calotes versicolor (Daudin, 1802)
    - (Gekkonidae)
      - Cyrtodactylus phetchaburiensis Pauwels, Sumontha & Bauer, 2016
      - Dixonius siamensis (Boulenger, 1899)
      - Hemidactylus platyurus (Schneider, 1797)
    - (Scincidae)
      - Eutropis macularia (Blyth, 1853)
      - Lygosoma quadrupes (Linnaeus, 1766)
  - Snakes
    - (Colubridae)
      - Ahaetulla prasina (F. Boie, 1827)
      - Boiga siamensis Nutaphand, 1971
      - Boiga cyanea (Duméril, Bibron & Duméril, 1854)
      - Chrysopelea ornata (Shaw, 1802)
      - Coelognathus radiatus (F. Boie, 1827)
      - Lycodon davisoni (Blanford, 1878)
      - Lycodon capucinus (F. Boie1827)
      - Lycodon laoensis Günther, 1864
      - Oligodon fasciolatus Günther, 1864
      - Ptyas mucosa (Linnaeus, 1758)
    - (Elapidae)
      - Naja kaouthia Lesson, 1831
      - Ophiophagus hannah (Cantor, 1836)
    - (Homalopsidae)
      - Hypsiscopus plumbea (F. Boie, 1827)
    - (Lamprophiidae)
      - Psammodynastes pulverulentus (F. Boie, 1827)
    - (Natricidae)
      - Fowlea cf. piscator (Schneider, 1799)
    - (Pareatidae)
      - Pareas carinatus (F. Boie 1828)
      - Pareas margaritophorus (Jan, 1866)
    - (Pythonidae)
      - (Malayo)Python reticulatus (Schneider, 1801)
    - (Viperidae)
      - Trimeresurus albolabris Gray, 1842
    - (Xenopeltidae)
      - Xenopeltis unicolor F. Boie, 1827
- Amphibians
  - (Ichthyophiidae)
    - Ichthyophis kohtaoensis Taylor, 1960
  - (Bufonidae)
    - Duttaphrynus melanostictus (Schneider, 1799)
  - (Dicroglossidae)
    - Fejervarya limnocharis (Gravenhorst, 1829)
    - Limnonectes blythii (Boulenger, 1920)
    - Limnonectes jarujini Matsui, Panha, Khonsue, and Kuraishi, 2010
  - (Microhylidae)
    - Glyphoglossus guttulatus (Blyth, 1856)
    - Glyphoglossus molossus Günther, 1869
    - Microhyla fissipes Boulenger, 1884
    - Microhyla heymonsi, Vogt, 1911
    - Micryletta inornata (Boulenger, 1890)
  - (Ranidae)
    - Hylarana erythraea (Schlegel, 1837)
  - (Rhacophoridae)
    - Polypedates megacephalus Hallowell, 1860

== Description ==
See snake scales for terms used

It is characterized by a maximal known SVL of 485.8 mm; 6 maxillary teeth, the posterior two enlarged; 17-17-15 or 17-15-15 dorsal scale rows; 166–173 ventral scales and 35–41 subcaudal scales in males; a single anal scale; deeply forked hemipenes lacking spines and papillae, extending in situ to the 14th subcaudal; faint to nearly indistinct vertebral, paravertebral and lateral stripes; no dorsal or supracaudal blotches or crossbars; and a uniformly ivory venter lacking subrectangular or squarish blotches.

== Distribution ==
Oligodon huahin is only known from seven type specimens found at the type locality, within a range of approximately 1000 m^{2}, and therefore its distribution is poorly understood, although a "DOR" (dead on road) specimen was later found at a different location and habitat about 12 km away, which indicates that the species is adaptable to several different habitats than the one found at the type locality. This large specimen, with SVL of 520 mm, was not used in the description. The holotype and the paratypes was all collected from the type locality in Hua Hin District, Prachuap Khiri Khan Province, Thailand. This species is for now proven to be endemic to the Hua Hin District, but it is likely to found in parts of the Phetchaburi Province as well.

== Conservation ==
The conservation threats to O. huahin are not known, because the species is only known from a few specimens found at the same spot. The area from which these were collected is not under any sort of protection, and is therefore threatened by deforestation. The species is «Not Evaluated» by the "International Union for Conservation of Nature" (IUCN Red List).
