= 1743 in science =

List of years in science	(table)
- … 1733; 1734; 1735; 1736; 1737; 1738; 1739; 1740; 1741; 1742; 1743; 1744; 1745; 1746; 1747; 1748; 1749; 1750; 1751; 1752; 1753 …
- Art; Archaeology; Architecture; Literature; Music; Philosophy; Science; +...

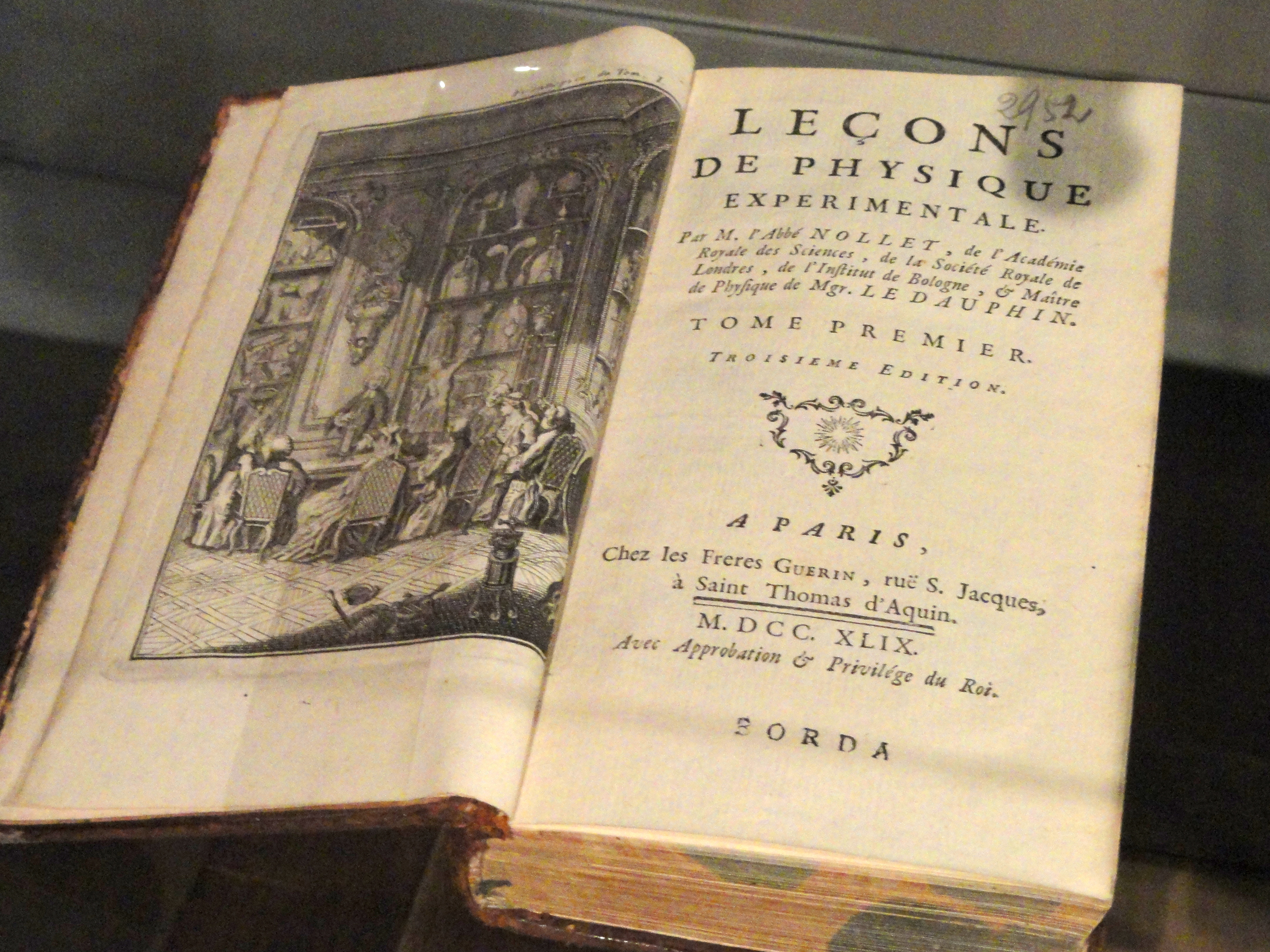
“Leçons de physique expérimentale", 3rd edition, 1749, by Abbé Nollet (Jean-Antoine Nollet). Exhibit in the Musée Nicéphore Niépce, 28 Quai Messageries, Saône-et-Loire, France.

The year 1743 in science and technology involved some significant events.

== Astronomy ==
- November 29 – Discovery of C/1743 X1, the 'Great Comet of 1744' (sic.), by Jan de Munck at Middelburg and subsequently by de Chéseaux and Klinkenberg.

== Geology ==
- Sir Christopher Packe produces a geological map of south-east England.

== Metrology ==
- May 19 – French physicist Jean-Pierre Christin of Lyon publishes the design of a mercury thermometer with a centigrade scale running from 0 representing the freezing point of water and 100 its boiling point.

== Physiology and medicine ==
- June 2 – British surgeon William Hunter presents his paper "Of the structure and diseases of articulating cartilages".

== Awards ==
- Copley Medal: Abraham Trembley

== Births ==
- February 13 – Joseph Banks, English botanist (died 1820)
- February 28 – René Just Haüy, French mineralogist (died 1822)
- April 13 (April 2 O.S.) – Thomas Jefferson, Founding Father and 3rd President of the United States and inventor (died 1826)
- June 3 – Lucia Galeazzi Galvani, Italian scientist (died 1788)
- August 17 – Eberhard August Wilhelm von Zimmermann, German geographer and zoologist (died 1815)
- August 26 – Antoine Lavoisier, French chemist (died 1794)
- September 17 – Marquis de Condorcet, French mathematician, philosopher and political scientist (died 1794)
- October 20 – François Chopart, French surgeon (died 1795)
- November 11 – Carl Peter Thunberg, Swedish botanist (died 1828)
- December 1 – Martin Heinrich Klaproth, German chemist (died 1817)
- Elisabeth Christina von Linné, Swedish botanist (died 1782)
