= 1737 in science =

List of years in science	(table)
- … 1727; 1728; 1729; 1730; 1731; 1732; 1733; 1734; 1735; 1736; 1737; 1738; 1739; 1740; 1741; 1742; 1743; 1744; 1745; 1746; 1747 …
- Art; Archaeology; Architecture; Literature; Music; Philosophy; Science; +...

The year 1737 in science and technology involved some significant events.

== Astronomy ==
- May 28 – The planet Venus passes in front of Mercury. The event is witnessed during the evening by amateur astronomer John Bevis at the Royal Greenwich Observatory in England.

== Botany ==
- February 27 – French scientists Henri-Louis Duhamel du Monceau and Georges-Louis Leclerc de Buffon publish the first study correlating past weather conditions with an examination of tree rings.
- Elizabeth Blackwell's A Curious Herbal, with her own colour illustrations, is published in London.
- Johannes Burman's Thesaurus zeylanicus, a flora of Ceylon, is published in Amsterdam.

== Geology ==
- Francesco Serao is the first person to use the word lava in connection with extruded magma in a short account of the eruption of Mount Vesuvius which took place between May 14 and June 4.
- October 11 – An earthquake in Calcutta, India is said to have caused 300,000 deaths; this is now in question: it was probably a cyclone, with deaths estimated at 3,000.
- October 16 – An earthquake with an estimated magnitude of 9.3 strikes offshore of the Kamchatka Peninsula.

== Mathematics ==
- Divergence of the sum of the reciprocals of the primes proved by Leonhard Euler.

== Technology ==
- John Harrison is given an award from the longitude prize to continue his work on development of a stable marine chronometer in England.

== Publications ==
- Venetian polymath Francesco Algarotti publishes Newtonianism for Ladies, or Dialogues on Light and Colours (Neutonianismo per le dame).

== Awards ==
- Copley Medal: John Belchier

== Births ==
- January 4 – Louis-Bernard Guyton de Morveau, French chemist and politician (died 1816)
- August 14 – Charles Hutton, English mathematician (died 1823)
- September 9 – Luigi Galvani, Italian physicist (died 1798)
