= 1751 in science =

List of years in science	(table)
- … 1741; 1742; 1743; 1744; 1745; 1746; 1747; 1748; 1749; 1750; 1751; 1752; 1753; 1754; 1755; 1756; 1757; 1758; 1759; 1760; 1761 …
- Art; Archaeology; Architecture; Literature; Music; Philosophy; Science; +...

The year 1751 in science and technology involved some significant events.

== Astronomy ==
- The globular cluster 47 Tucanae (or 47 Tuc), visible with the unaided eye from the southern hemisphere, is discovered by the French astronomer Nicolas Louis de Lacaille, who catalogues it in his list of southern nebulous objects: at a distance of 16000 lightyears, it has a total mass nearly 1 million times the Sun's mass and is 120 light years across, making it appear in the sky as wide as the full moon.

== Biology ==
- Linnaeus publishes his Philosophia Botanica, the first textbook of descriptive systematic botanical taxonomy and the first appearance of his binomial nomenclature.

== Chemistry ==
- Nickel (symbol Ni, atomic weight 58.71, atomic number 28) is discovered, in the mineral nickeline, by chemist Axel Fredrik Cronstedt in Stockholm, Sweden (although nickel was used in coins in China as early as 235 BCE).

== Medicine and physiology ==
- May 11 – Pennsylvania Hospital founded in Philadelphia by Benjamin Franklin and Thomas Bond, the first in the United States.
- Newcastle Infirmary founded in Newcastle upon Tyne, England.
- The pupil reflex is discovered: it is the first reflex of the human body to be discovered.

== Publications ==
- Commencement of publication in Paris of the Encyclopédie, ou dictionnaire raisonné des sciences, des arts et des métiers edited by Denis Diderot and Jean d'Alembert.
- 1st edition of Benjamin Franklin's Experiments and Observations on Electricity is published.

== Awards ==
- Copley Medal: John Canton

== Births ==
- April 5 – Maria Lullin, Swiss entomologist (died 1822)
- March 3 – Pierre Prévost, Swiss philosopher and physicist (died 1839)
- March 17 – Anders Dahl, Swedish botanist (died 1789)
- June 3 or 29 – William Roxburgh, Scottish surgeon and botanist, "father of Indian botany" (died 1815)
- July 1 – Antide Janvier, French precision clockmaker (died 1835)
- December 10 – George Shaw, English naturalist (died 1813)

== Deaths ==
- June 9 – John Machin, English mathematician and astronomer (born c. 1686)
- August 22 – Andrew Gordon, Scottish-born Benedictine monk, physicist and inventor (born 1712)
- August 30 – Christopher Polhem, Swedish scientist and inventor (born 1661)
- November 30 – Jean-Philippe de Cheseaux, Swiss mathematician and astronomer (born 1718)
