= 1742 in science =

List of years in science	(table)
- … 1732; 1733; 1734; 1735; 1736; 1737; 1738; 1739; 1740; 1741; 1742; 1743; 1744; 1745; 1746; 1747; 1748; 1749; 1750; 1751; 1752 …
- Art; Archaeology; Architecture; Literature; Music; Philosophy; Science; +...

The year 1742 in science and technology involved some significant events.

== Astronomy ==
- January 14 – Death of Edmond Halley; James Bradley succeeds him as Astronomer Royal in Great Britain.

== Mathematics ==
- June – Christian Goldbach produces Goldbach's conjecture.
- Colin Maclaurin publishes his Treatise on Fluxions in Great Britain, the first systematic exposition of Newton's methods.

== Metrology ==
- Anders Celsius publishes his proposal for a centigrade temperature scale originated in 1741.

== Physiology and medicine ==
- Surgeon Joseph Hurlock publishes his A Practical Treatise upon Dentition, or The breeding of teeth in children in London, the first treatise in English on dentition.

== Technology ==
- Benjamin Robins publishes his New Principles of Gunnery, containing the determination of the force of gun-powder and an investigation of the difference in the resisting power of the air to swift and slow motions in London, containing a description of his ballistic pendulum and the results of his scientific experiments into improvements in ballistics.
- The first large (12 ft focal length) reflecting telescope is made, in Gregorian form, by James Short, for use by Charles Spencer, 3rd Duke of Marlborough, in London.

== Awards ==
- Copley Medal: Christopher Middleton.

== Births ==
- March 15 (bapt.) – John Stackhouse, English botanist (died 1819).
- May 18 – Lionel Lukin, English inventor (died 1834).
- December 3 – James Rennell, English geographer, historian and oceanographer (died 1830).
- December 9 – Carl Wilhelm Scheele, Swedish chemist (died 1786).
- December 26 – Ignaz von Born, Hungarian metallurgist (died 1791).

== Deaths ==
- January 14 – Edmond Halley, English astronomer, geophysicist, mathematician, meteorologist, and physicist (born 1656).
- February 28 – Willem 's Gravesande, Dutch polymath (born 1688).
- May 13 – Nicolas Andry, French physician (born 1658).
- September 22 – Frederic Louis Norden, Danish explorer (born 1708).
