= 1749 in science =

List of years in science	(table)
- … 1739; 1740; 1741; 1742; 1743; 1744; 1745; 1746; 1747; 1748; 1749; 1750; 1751; 1752; 1753; 1754; 1755; 1756; 1757; 1758; 1759 …
- Art; Archaeology; Architecture; Literature; Music; Philosophy; Science; +...

The year 1749 in science and technology involved some significant events.

== Astronomy ==
- Pierre Bouguer publishes La figure de la terre in Paris, describing some of the results of his work with Charles Marie de La Condamine on the French Geodesic Mission to Peru (begun in 1735) to measure a degree of the meridian arc near the equator.

== Biology ==
- Georges-Louis Leclerc, afterwards Comte du Buffon, begins publication of his Histoire naturelle, générale et particulière.

== Mathematics ==
- April 12 – Euler produces the first proof of Fermat's theorem on sums of two squares, based on infinite descent.

== Institutions ==
- April 12 – Official opening of the Radcliffe Library in Oxford, built under the will of the physician John Radcliffe (died 1714) (although it does not become a primarily science library until 1810).
- Pehr Wilhelm Wargentin appointed Secretary of the Royal Swedish Academy of Sciences in Stockholm, a position he will hold until his death in 1783.

== Awards ==
- Copley Medal: John Harrison

== Births ==
- February 4 – Thomas Earnshaw, English watchmaker (died 1829)
- February 7 - Philippe Petit-Radel, French surgeon (died 1815)
- March 23 – Pierre-Simon Laplace, French mathematician and astronomer (died 1827)
- May 17 – Edward Jenner, English physician, inventor of the smallpox vaccine (died 1823)
- September 6 – Benjamin Bell, Scottish surgeon (died 1806)
- September 25 – Abraham Gottlob Werner, German geologist (died 1817)
- November 3 – Daniel Rutherford, Scottish physician, chemist and botanist noted for the isolation of nitrogen (died 1819)

== Deaths ==
- September 10 – Émilie du Châtelet, French mathematician and physicist (born 1706)
- December 23 – Mark Catesby, English naturalist (born 1683)
