= 1759 in science =

List of years in science	(table)
- … 1749; 1750; 1751; 1752; 1753; 1754; 1755; 1756; 1757; 1758; 1759; 1760; 1761; 1762; 1763; 1764; 1765; 1766; 1767; 1768; 1769 …
- Art; Archaeology; Architecture; Literature; Music; Philosophy; Science; +...

The year 1759 in science and technology involved several significant events.

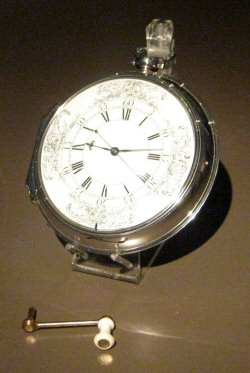
Harrison's marine chronometer

== Astronomy ==
- Halley's Comet returns; a team of three mathematicians, Alexis Clairaut, Jérome Lalande and Nicole Reine Lepaute, have – for the first time – predicted the date.

== Biology ==
- Caspar Friedrich Wolff's dissertation at the University of Halle Theoria Generationis supports the theory of epigenesis.

== Botany ==
- Kew Gardens established in England by Augusta of Saxe-Coburg, the mother of George III.

== Geology ==
- Giovanni Arduino proposes dividing the geological history of Earth into four periods: Primitive, Secondary, Tertiary and Volcanic, or Quaternary.

== Medicine ==
- June 15 – The first vascular surgery in history is performed by a Dr. Hallowell at Newcastle upon Tyne in England, who uses suture repair rather than a tying off with a ligature to repair an aneurysm on a patient's brachial artery. The new procedure of reconstructing a damaged artery replaces the practice of ligation that had risked the amputation of a limb or organ failure.
- Angélique du Coudray publishes Abrégé de l'art des accouchements ("The Art of Obstetrics").

== Physics ==
- Posthumous publication of Émilie du Châtelet's French translation and commentary on Newton's Principia, Principes mathématiques de la philosophie naturelle.

== Technology ==
- English clockmaker John Harrison produces his "No. 1 sea watch" ("H4"), the first successful marine chronometer.

== Transport ==
- James Brindley is engaged by the Duke of Bridgewater to construct a canal to transport coal to Manchester from the duke's mines at Worsley, in North West England.
- October 16 – Smeaton's Tower, John Smeaton's Eddystone Lighthouse off the coast of South West England, is first illuminated.

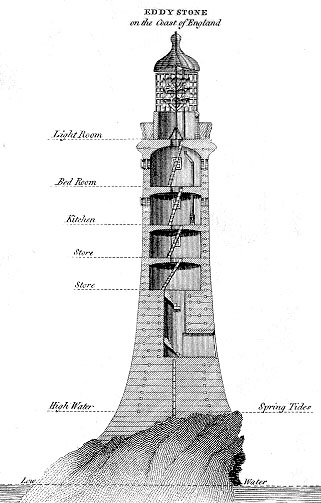
Smeaton's Tower

== Awards ==
- Copley Medal: John Smeaton

== Births ==
- January 29 – Louis Augustin Guillaume Bosc, French botanist (died 1828)
- July 19 – Jacques Anselme Dorthès, French physician, entomologist and naturalist (died 1794)
- August 12 – Thomas Andrew Knight, English horticulturalist (died 1838)
- September 19 – William Kirby, English entomologist (died 1850)
- December 2 – James Edward Smith, English botanist (died 1828)
- Date unknown – Maria Petraccini, Italian anatomist and physician (died 1791)

== Deaths ==
- February 16 – Bartholomew Mosse, Irish surgeon (born 1712)
- April 6 – Johann Gottfried Zinn, German anatomist and botanist (born 1727)
- July 27 – Pierre Louis Maupertuis, French mathematician (born 1698)
- September 10 – Ferdinand Konščak, Croatian explorer (born 1703)
- November 29 – Nicolaus I Bernoulli, Swiss mathematician (born 1687)
