= 1741 in science =

| List of years in science | (table) |
- … 1731; 1732; 1733; 1734; 1735; 1736; 1737; 1738; 1739; 1740; 1741; 1742; 1743; 1744; 1745; 1746; 1747; 1748; 1749; 1750; 1751 …
- Art; Archaeology; Architecture; Literature; Music; Philosophy; Science; +...

The year 1741 in science and technology involved some significant events.

== Astronomy ==
- August 29 – Pluto (not known at the time) reached perihelion (closest approach to the Sun).
- December 11 – a "Fire-ball" and explosion heard over southern England, about 11 a.m. "a countryman ... saw a flash of Lightning Before he heard the Noise ... The sound was double ... a Ball of Fire ... took its Course to the East ... over Westminster ... it divided into Two Heads [and] left a Train of Smoke ... which continued ascending for 20 minutes". The description is reminiscent of the Chelyabinsk meteor of 2013.
- Anders Celsius establishes the Uppsala Astronomical Observatory.
- Pehr Wilhelm Wargentin publishes his first paper on the moons of Jupiter, in the Acta of the Royal Society of Sciences in Uppsala.
- Edmund Weaver publishes The British Telescope: Being an Ephemeris of the Coelestial Motions.

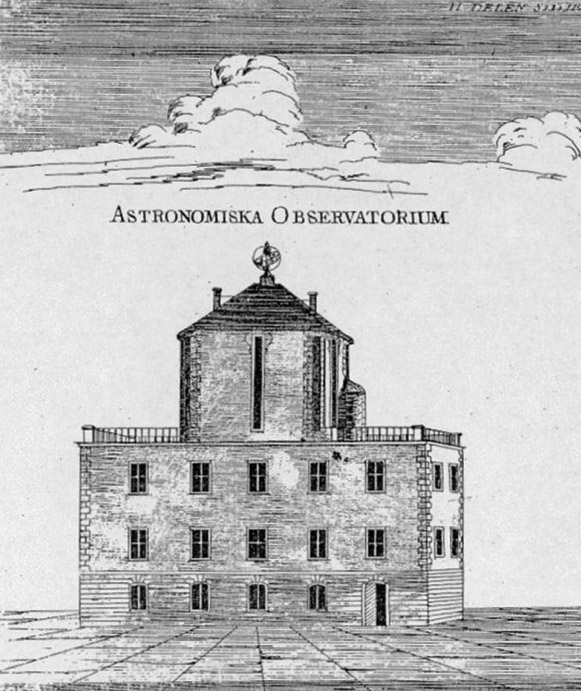
Uppsala Astronomical Observatory from a contemporary engraving.

== Botany ==
- Johann Jacob Dillenius publishes Historia Muscorum, a significant work on cryptogams.

== Exploration ==
- May – Vitus Bering sets out from Petropavlovsk-Kamchatsky to map the coasts of Siberia and Alaska.
- July 15 – Alexei Chirikov sights land in Southeast Alaska. He sends some men ashore in a longboat, making them the first Europeans to visit Alaska.

== Medicine ==
- Nicolas Andry publishes Orthopédie, giving a name to the discipline of orthopedics.

== Metrology ==
- December 25 – Anders Celsius proposes a centigrade temperature scale.

== Zoology ==
- July 20 – Georg Wilhelm Steller, physician on Bering’s Second Kamchatka Expedition, becomes the first European naturalist to set foot on Alaskan soil (Kayak Island), identifying many species for the first time, including Steller's jay. On the return voyage he discovers Steller's sea cow (extinct by 1768).

== Awards ==
- Copley Medal: John Theophilus Desaguliers

== Births ==
- January 20 – Carl Linnaeus the Younger, Swedish naturalist (died 1783)
- March 17 – William Withering, English botanist, geologist, chemist and physician who discovered digitalis (died 1799)
- September 22 – Peter Simon Pallas, German zoologist (died 1811)
- probable date – Bryan Higgins, Irish-born chemist (died 1818)

== Deaths ==
- May 16 – Jacob Christoph Le Blon, German inventor of four-colour printing (born 1667)
- December 19 – Vitus Bering, Danish-born Russian explorer (born 1681) (on Bering Island)
