= 1791 in science =

List of years in science	(table)
- … 1781; 1782; 1783; 1784; 1785; 1786; 1787; 1788; 1789; 1790; 1791; 1792; 1793; 1794; 1795; 1796; 1797; 1798; 1799; 1800; 1801 …
- Art; Archaeology; Architecture; Literature; Music; Philosophy; Science; +...

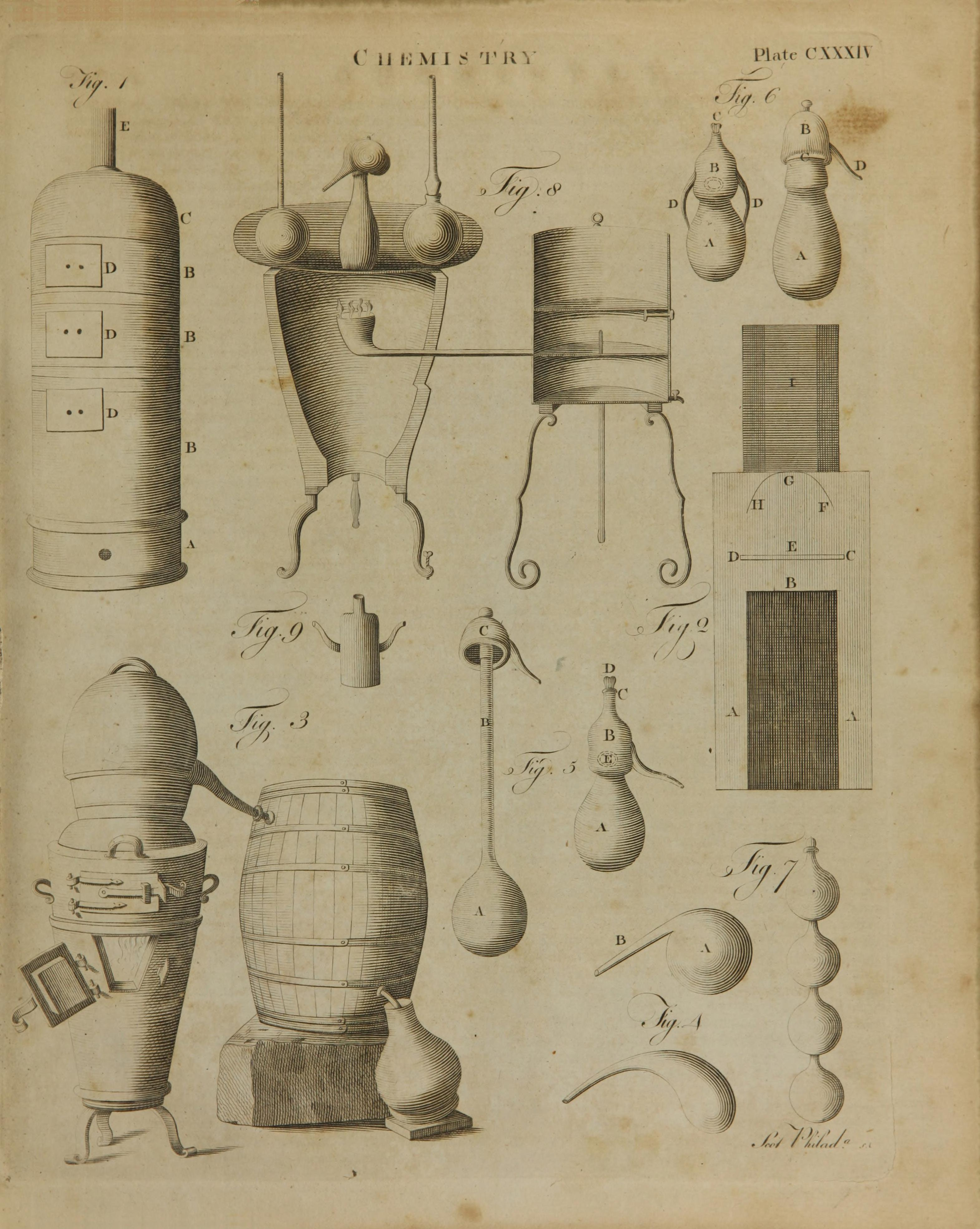

The year 1791 in science and technology involved some significant events.

== Biology ==
- Jean Baptiste François Pierre Bulliard begins publication of Histoire des champignons de la France, a significant text in mycology.
- Luigi Galvani publishes his discoveries in "animal electricity" (Galvanism).

== Chemistry ==
- Nicolas Leblanc patents the Leblanc process for the production of soda ash (sodium carbonate) from common salt (sodium chloride).
- The element Titanium is discovered included in ilmenite in Cornwall, England, by local amateur geologist Rev. William Gregor.

== Medicine ==
- May 7 – Irish surgeon Samuel Croker-King first describes his trepanning device.

== Metrology ==
- March – In France, the National Constituent Assembly accepts the recommendation of its Commission of Weights and Measures that the nation should adopt the metric system.

== Physics ==
- Pierre Prévost shows that all bodies radiate heat, no matter how hot or cold they are.

== Technology ==
- James Rumsey is granted a patent related to fluid power engineering, in England.

== Publications ==
- Sir John Sinclair's Statistical Account of Scotland begins publication, introducing the term Statistics into English.

== Awards ==
- Copley Medal: James Rennell; Jean-André Deluc

== Births ==
- March 20 – John Farey, English mechanical engineer and technical writer (died 1851)
- April 9 – George Peacock, English mathematician (died 1858)
- April 27 – Samuel F. B. Morse, American inventor (died 1872)
- July 13 – Allan Cunningham, English botanist and explorer (died 1839)
- July 27 – Jean-Nicolas Gannal, French pharmacist, chemist and inventor (died 1852)
- September 4 – Robert Knox, Scottish anatomist (died 1862)
- September 22 – Michael Faraday, English chemist and physicist (died 1867)
- September 23 – Johann Franz Encke, German astronomer (died 1865)
- December 26 – Charles Babbage, English mathematician and inventor of computing machines (died 1871)

== Deaths ==
- July 24 – Ignaz von Born, Hungarian metallurgist (born 1742)
- Date unknown – Maria Petraccini, Italian anatomist and physician (died 1759)
