= 1753 in science =

List of years in science	(table)
- … 1743; 1744; 1745; 1746; 1747; 1748; 1749; 1750; 1751; 1752; 1753; 1754; 1755; 1756; 1757; 1758; 1759; 1760; 1761; 1762; 1763 …
- Art; Archaeology; Architecture; Literature; Music; Philosophy; Science; +...

The year 1753 in science and technology involved some significant events.

== Astronomy ==
- Ruđer Bošković's De lunae atmosphaera demonstrates the lack of atmosphere on the Moon.

== Botany ==
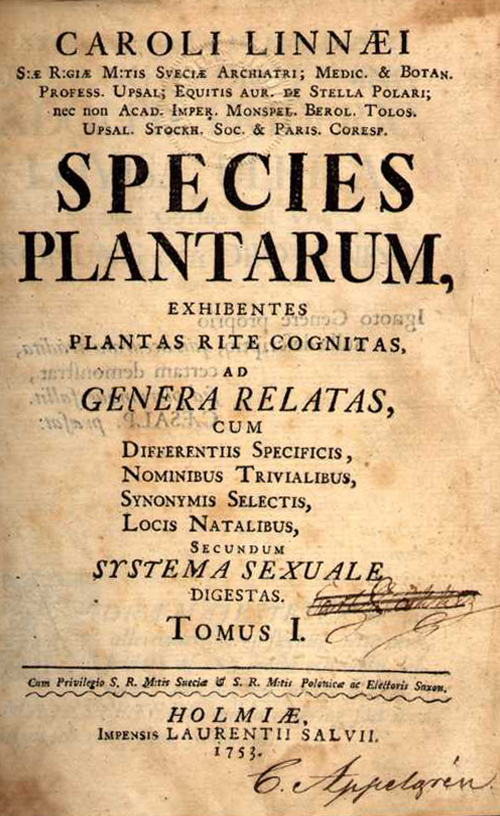
Species Plantarum

- May 1 – Publication of Linnaeus' Species Plantarum, the start of formal scientific classification of plants.
- June – Establishment in Florence of the Accademia dei Georgofili, the world's oldest society devoted to agronomy and scientific agriculture.

== Chemistry ==
- Claude François Geoffroy demonstrates that bismuth is distinct from lead and tin.

== Computer science ==
- January 1 – Retrospectively, the minimum date value for a datetime field in an SQL Server (up to version 2005) due to this being the first full year since Britain's adoption of the Gregorian calendar.

== Medicine ==
- James Lind publishes the first edition of A Treatise on the Scurvy (although it is little noticed at this time).

== Physics ==
- November 25 – The Russian Academy of Sciences announces a competition among chemists and physicists to provide "the best explanation of the true causes of electricity including their theory"; the prize will be won in 1755 by Johann Euler.

== Technology ==
- February 17 – The concept of electrical telegraphy is first published in the form of a letter from 'C. M.' to The Scots' Magazine.
- Benjamin Franklin invents the lightning rod, to ring a bell when struck by lightning, following his 1752 kite and key tests.
- George Semple uses hydraulic lime cement in rebuilding Essex Bridge in Dublin.

== Awards ==
- Copley Medal: Benjamin Franklin

== Births ==
- March 26 – Sir Benjamin Thompson, Count Rumford, Anglo-American physicist (died 1814)
- April 28 – Franz Karl Achard, chemist (died 1821)
- August 3 – Charles Stanhope, 3rd Earl Stanhope, British statesman and scientist (died 1816)

== Deaths ==
- August 6 – Georg Wilhelm Richmann, Russian physicist, electrocuted (born 1711)
- December – Thomas Melvill, Scottish natural philosopher (born 1726)
