= 1745 in science =

List of years in science	(table)
- … 1735; 1736; 1737; 1738; 1739; 1740; 1741; 1742; 1743; 1744; 1745; 1746; 1747; 1748; 1749; 1750; 1751; 1752; 1753; 1754; 1755 …
- Art; Archaeology; Architecture; Literature; Music; Philosophy; Science; +...

The year 1745 in science and technology involved some significant events.

== Astronomy ==
- The Omega Nebula, Messier 25, Messier 35, and IC 4665 are discovered by Philippe Loys de Chéseaux.

== Biology ==
- Charles Bonnet publishes his first work on entomology, entitled Traité d'insectologie.

== Geography ==
- The Cassini projection, a type of map projection, is described by César-François Cassini de Thury.

== Medicine ==
- May 2 – The Company of Surgeons separates from the Company of Barbers of London.
- The Dublin Lying-In Hospital is established by Bartholomew Mosse.

== Physics ==
- The Leyden jar, a device for storing electric charge, is invented by Pieter van Musschenbroek. It Is the first capacitor.
- Andrew Gordon describes the "whirl", the first electrostatic reaction motor, and "electric chimes", the first instance of the application of what comes to be called electric convection, in his Versuch einer Erklarung der Electricitat.
- Ruđer Bošković publishes De Viribus Vivis in which he tries to find a middle way between Newton's gravitational theory and Leibniz's monadology, developing a concept of "impenetrability" as a property of hard bodies which explains their behavior in terms of force rather than matter.

== Technology ==
- The first blasting cap, or detonator, is demonstrated by a William Watson of the Royal Society.

== Awards ==
- Copley Medal: William Watson

== Births ==
- January 6 – Jacques Étienne Montgolfier, French inventor (died 1799)
- January 7 – Johan Christian Fabricius, Danish entomologist (died 1808)
- January 23 – William Jessop, English civil engineer (died 1814)
- February 18 – Alessandro Volta, Italian physicist and chemist (died 1827)
- April 20 – Philippe Pinel, French psychiatrist (died 1826)
- April 26 – Johann Anton Güldenstädt, German naturalist and explorer (died 1781)
- November 30 – Jean-Louis Baudelocque, French obstetrician (died 1810)
- December 15 – Johann Gottfried Koehler, German astronomer (died 1801)
- December 28 – Juan de Ayala, Spanish explorer (died 1797)
- William Cruikshank, Scottish-born anatomist and chemist (died 1800)

== Deaths ==
- November 30 – Johann Bessler, German inventor (born 1680)
