= 1716 in science =

The year 1716 in science and technology involved some significant events.

== Chemistry ==
- Johann von Löwenstern-Kunckel publishes his handbook of experimental chemistry, Collegium physico-chymicum experimentale, oder, Laboratorium chymicum, in Germany.

== Events ==
- Tsar Peter the Great of Russia studies with the physician Herman Boerhaave at Leiden University.

== Births ==
- January 12 – Antonio de Ulloa, Spanish explorer (died 1795)
- March 6 – Pehr Kalm, Swedish botanist and explorer (died 1779)
- May 29 – Louis-Jean-Marie Daubenton, French naturalist (died 1799)
- c. August 18 – Johan Maurits Mohr, Dutch astronomer (died 1775)
- October 3 – Giovanni Battista Beccaria, Italian physicist (died 1781)
- October 4 – James Lind, Scottish-born pioneer of hygiene in the British Royal Navy (died 1794)
- December 27 – Leonardo Ximenes, Tuscan polymath (died 1786)
- James Brindley, English engineer (died 1772)

== Deaths ==
- November 14 – Gottfried Leibniz, German scientist and mathematician (born 1646)
