= 1872 in science =

The year 1872 in science and technology involved some significant events, listed below.

== Chemistry ==
- Robert Chesebrough patents Vaseline in the United States
- Eugen Baumann rediscovers polyvinyl chloride
- Charles-Adolphe Wurtz discovers the aldol reaction

== Conservation ==
- March 1 – Yellowstone National Park is established in the United States, the world's first national park

== Exploration ==
- May 13–September 26 – Benjamin Leigh Smith's 1872 expedition to Jan Mayen and Svalbard
- December 21 – Challenger expedition: HMS Challenger (1858) sails from Portsmouth in England on the 4-year scientific expedition that lays the foundation for the science of oceanography

== Mathematics ==
- Richard Dedekind publishes Stetigkeit und irrationale Zahlen, a theory of irrational numbers
- Felix Klein produces the Erlangen program on geometries

== Medicine ==
- February 15 – George Huntington makes the first detailed description of Huntington's disease, in Middleport, Ohio
- Moritz Kaposi describes Kaposi's sarcoma and the manifestations of systemic lupus erythematosus
- Ferdinand Monoyer proposes the dioptre as a unit for measuring the optical power of a lens

== Physics ==
- Ludwig Boltzmann states the Boltzmann equation for the temporal development of distribution functions in phase space, and publishes his H-theorem

== Technology ==
- April 1 – English hangman William Marwood first uses his technique of the long drop (on uxoricide William Frederick Horry at Lincoln Castle)
- April 2 – George Brayton obtains a United States patent for a constant pressure internal combustion engine, initially using vaporized gas, and marketed as 'Brayton's Ready Motor'
- John Hopkinson proposes the group flash system for distinguishing lighthouses
- Reverend C. M. Ramus of Sussex, England, devises the single-step hydroplane hull

== Institutions ==
- October 1 – the Virginia Agricultural and Mechanical College begins its first academic session
- The Polytechnic Museum in Moscow is founded

== Publications ==
- May – the magazine Popular Science is first published in the United States
- Charles Darwin publishes The Expression of the Emotions in Man and Animals

== Awards ==
- Copley Medal: Friedrich Woehler
- Wollaston Medal for geology: James Dwight Dana

== Births ==
- April 5 – Samuel Cate Prescott (died 1962), American food scientist and microbiologist
- April 21 - Charles Gandy (died 1943), French physician.
- May 6 – Willem de Sitter (died 1934), Dutch mathematician, physicist and astronomer
- May 21 – Henry E. Warren (died 1957), American inventor
- May 31 – Charles Greeley Abbot (died 1973), American astrophysicist
- August 1 – Solomon Carter Fuller (died 1953), Liberian-born psychiatrist
- September 23 – Marie Depage (died in sinking of the RMS Lusitania 1915), Belgian nurse
- October 4 – Ernest Fourneau (died 1949), French medicinal chemist

== Deaths ==
- March 8 – Priscilla Susan Bury (born 1799), English botanist
- April 2 – Samuel Morse (born 1791), American inventor
- May 6 – George Robert Gray (born 1808), English zoologist
- August 11 – Sir Andrew Smith (born 1797), Scottish-born military surgeon, explorer, ethnologist and zoologist
- August 22 – Pierre Charles Alexandre Louis (born 1787), French physician
- November 7 – Alfred Clebsch (born 1833), German mathematician
- December 6 – Félix Archimède Pouchet (born 1800), French scientist
- December 24 – William John Macquorn Rankine (born 1820), Scottish physicist
- Anne Elizabeth Ball (born 1808), Irish psychologist
