= 1894 in science =

The year 1894 in science and technology involved some significant events, listed below.

== Astronomy ==
- March 21 (23:00 GMT) – Syzygy: Mercury transits the Sun as seen from Venus, and Mercury and Venus both simultaneously transit the Sun as seen from Saturn.

== Biology ==
- Patrick Manson develops the thesis that malaria is spread by mosquitoes.
- Jean Pierre Mégnin publishes La faune des cadavres application de l'entomologie à la médecine légale in Paris, an important text in forensic entomology.
- Alexandre Yersin and Kitasato Shibasaburō independently identify the bacterium later called Yersinia pestis in the 1894 Hong Kong plague.

== Chemistry ==
- Argon identified by Lord Rayleigh and Sir William Ramsay.
- Viscose, a form of artificial silk or rayon, is patented by Charles Frederick Cross with Edward John Bevan and Clayton Beadle.

== Physiology and medicine ==
- Otto Binswanger describes what will become known as Binswanger's disease.

== Psychology ==
- Psychological Review established in the United States by James Mark Baldwin and James McKeen Cattell.

== Technology ==
- August 13 – The first Allan truss bridge, designed by Percy Allan, is completed in New South Wales.
- August 14 – Oliver Lodge demonstrates "Hertzian waves" i.e. radio transmission (of Morse code) in the University of Oxford from the Clarendon Laboratory to the University Museum (200 ft; 61 m) for the British Association for the Advancement of Science using a modified Branly coherer.
- November 6 – William C. Hooker of Abingdon, Illinois is granted a United States patent for a spring-loaded mousetrap.
- Construction of the first oil-engined rail locomotive, an experimental unit designed by William Dent Priestman and built by his company, Priestman Brothers of Hull, England.
- John Joly of Dublin devises the Joly colour screen, an additive colour photographic process for producing images from a single photographic plate.
- Corn flakes are created by Will Kellogg and family for patients at their Battle Creek Sanitarium in the United States.
- Astronomical photographer Julius Scheiner devises a film speed measurement system.

== Awards ==
- Copley Medal: Edward Frankland
- Wollaston Medal for Geology: Karl von Zittel

== Births ==
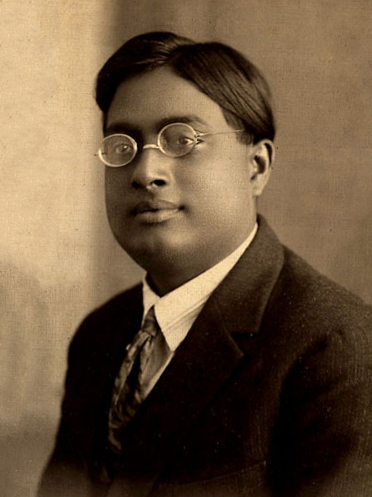
Born January 1: Satyendra Nath Bose

- January 1 – S. N. Bose (died 1974), Indian physicist.
- January 13 – Dorothée Pullinger (died 1986), French-born British production engineer.
- February 11 – Izaak Kolthoff (died 1993), Dutch 'father of analytical chemistry'.
- February 16 – Constance Tipper, née Elam (died 1995), English metallurgist.
- April 29 – Marietta Blau (died 1970), Austrian physicist.
- May 5 – August Dvorak (died 1975), American educational psychologist.
- June 13 – Leo Kanner (died 1981), Austrian-born clinical child psychiatrist.
- June 14 – W. W. E. Ross (died 1966), Canadian geophysicist and poet.
- June 23 – Alfred Kinsey (died 1956), American biologist, professor of entomology and zoology, and sexologist, founder of the Institute for Sex Research at Indiana University (Bloomington) in 1947.
- July 8 – Pyotr Kapitsa (died 1984), Russian physicist, Nobel Prize laureate.
- July 17 – Georges Lemaître (died 1966), Belgian physicist.
- August 2 – Bertha Lutz (died 1976), Brazilian herpetologist and women's rights campaigner.
- November 19 – Heinz Hopf (died 1971), German mathematician.

== Deaths ==
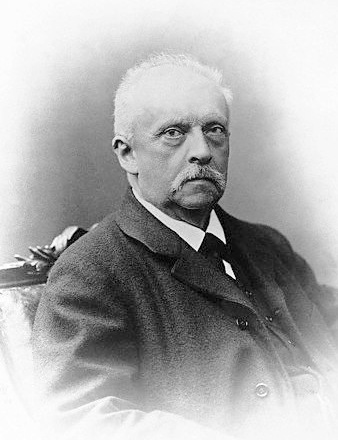
Died January 1: Hermann von Helmholtz

- January 1 – Heinrich Hertz (born 1857), German physicist.
- February 3 – Edmond Frémy (born 1814), French chemist.
- March 29 – Georges Pouchet (born 1833), French comparative anatomist.
- April 2 – Charles-Édouard Brown-Séquard (born 1817), Mauritian-born physiologist and neurologist.
- April 9 – Arthur Hill Hassall (born 1817), English physician, microbiologist and chemical analyst.
- April 27 – Birdsill Holly (born 1820), American hydraulic engineer.
- November 26 – Pafnuty Chebyshev (born 1821), Russian mathematician.
- October 7 – Oliver Wendell Holmes Sr. (born 1809), American physician and writer.
- September 8 – Hermann von Helmholtz (born 1821), German physicist.
