= 1896 in science =

The year 1896 in science and technology involved some significant events, listed below.

== Chemistry ==
- April – Svante Arrhenius first publishes the "greenhouse law", becoming the first person to predict that emissions of carbon dioxide from the burning of fossil fuels and other combustion processes are large enough to cause global warming through the greenhouse effect.

== Earth sciences ==
- June 15 – The 1896 Sanriku earthquake of 7.2 surface wave magnitude and tsunami in Japan kill 27,000.

== Exploration ==
- August – Conclusion of Nansen's Fram expedition.

== Mathematics ==
- The prime number theorem on the distribution of primes is proved.
- Ernst Schröder announces a proof of the Schröder–Bernstein theorem in set theory.
- Charles L. Dodgson publishes the first part of Symbolic Logic.
- Karl Pearson publishes significant contributions to correlation and regression.

== Meteorology ==
- International Cloud Atlas first published.

== Microbiology ==
- Ernest Duchesne discovers the antibiotic properties of penicillin as part of his doctoral research, but this is not followed up at this time.
- Ernest Hanbury Hankin discovers the antibiotic properties of what will become identified as bacteriophages.

== Physics ==
- January 12 – H. L. Smith takes the first X-ray photograph.
- March 1 – French physicist Henri Becquerel discovers the principle of radioactive decay when he exposes photographic plates to uranium.
- German physicist Wilhelm Wien derives Wien approximation.

== Physiology and medicine ==
- July – Victor Despeignes pioneers radiation oncology in Lyon.
- Antoine Marfan first describes the symptoms of Marfan syndrome.
- An improved sphygmomanometer, for the measurement of blood pressure, is described by Scipione Riva-Rocci.
- The 12th edition of Richard von Krafft-Ebing's Psychopathia Sexualis introduces the term 'paedophilia'.
- Belgian psychiatrist Jean Crocq publishes Les nèvroses traumatiques: ètude pathogènique & clinique.

== Technology ==
- Thomas Ellis Brown produces an innovative design of rolling bascule bridge for Brooklyn.
- Jesse W. Reno produces the first working escalator ("inclined elevator"), installed at Coney Island, Brooklyn.
- Gottlieb Daimler produces the first truck.
- Léon Serpollet invents the flash boiler for the steam car.
- Captain Neville Bertie-Clay, Superintendent of the British Army arsenal at Dum Dum in Bengal, invents an expanding bullet.
- December 11 – William Preece introduces Guglielmo Marconi's work in wireless telegraphy to the general public at a lecture, "Telegraphy without Wires", at the Toynbee Hall in London.

== Awards ==
- Copley Medal: Carl Gegenbaur
- Wollaston Medal for geology: Eduard Suess

== Births ==
- January 3 – Jay Laurence Lush (died 1982), American livestock geneticist.
- February 2 – Kazimierz Kuratowski (died 1980), Polish mathematician.
- February 14 – Arthur Milne (died 1950), English space physicist.
- February 28 – Philip Showalter Hench (died 1965), American physician, recipient of the Nobel Prize in Physiology or Medicine.
- March 29 – Wilhelm Ackermann (died 1962), German mathematician.
- April 7 – Donald Winnicott (died 1971), English child psychiatrist.
- April 14 – Priscilla Fairfield Bok (died 1975), American astronomer.
- April 30 – Hans List (died 1996), Austrian inventor.
- May 6 – Rolf Maximilian Sievert (died 1966), Swedish physicist.
- May 31 – Hilda Lyon (died 1946), English aeronautical engineer.
- June 1 – Shintaro Uda (died 1976), Japanese electrical engineer.
- June 7 – Robert S. Mulliken (died 1986), American physicist, recipient of the Nobel Prize in Chemistry.
- July 16 – Otmar von Verschuer (died 1969), German eugenicist.
- August 15 – Gerty Cori (née Radnitz) (died 1957), Prague-born winner of the Nobel Prize in Physiology or Medicine.

== Deaths ==
- June 23 – Joseph Prestwich (born 1812), English geologist.
- July 13 – August Kekulé (born 1829), German organic chemist.
- August 10 – Otto Lilienthal (born 1848), German aviation pioneer.
- September 18 – Hippolyte Fizeau (born 1819), French physicist.
- October 21 – James Henry Greathead (born 1844), British civil engineer.
- October 27 – H. Newell Martin (born 1848), British physiologist.
- November 3 – Eugen Baumann (born 1846), German chemist.
- November 22 – George Washington Gale Ferris Jr. (born 1859), American civil engineer, inventor of the Ferris wheel.
- December 10 – Alfred Nobel (born 1833), Swedish-born inventor.
