= 1706 in science =

The year 1706 in science and technology involved some significant events.

== Mathematics ==
- William Jones publishes Synopsis palmariorum matheseos or, A New Introduction to the Mathematics, Containing the Principles of Arithmetic and Geometry Demonstrated in a Short and Easie Method ... Designed for ... Beginners in which he
  - proposes using the symbol π (the Greek letter pi, as an abbreviation for perimeter) to represent the ratio of the circumference of a circle to its diameter.
  - introduces John Machin's quickly converging inverse-tangent series for π (pi), enabling it to be computed to 100 decimal places.

== Technology ==
- Francis Hauksbee produces his 'Influence machine' to generate static electricity.

== Publications ==
- Johann Jakob Scheuchzer begins publication in Zürich of his Beschreibung der Naturgeschichten des Schweitzerlands giving an account of the natural history and geology of Switzerland.
- Giovanni Battista Morgagni publishes Adversaria anatomica, the first in a series in which he describes his observations of human anatomy.

== Births ==
- January 17 – Benjamin Franklin, American scientist and inventor, known for his experiments with electricity (died 1790)
- January 28 – John Baskerville, English printer and inventor (died 1775)
- February 11 – Nils Rosén von Rosenstein, Swedish pediatrician (died 1773)
- May 12 – François Boissier de Sauvages de Lacroix, French physician and botanist (died 1767)
- June 10 – John Dollond, English optician (died 1761)
- December 17 – Émilie du Châtelet, French mathematician and physicist (died 1749)
- Date unknown – Giuseppe Asclepi, Italian astronomer and physicist (died 1776)

== Deaths ==
- June 15 – Giorgio Baglivi, Italian physician (born 1668)
- August 6 – Jean-Baptiste Du Hamel, French scientist, philosophe (born 1624)
- Date unknown – Jean Le Fèvre, French astronomer (born 1652)
- Date unknown – Jeanne Dumée, French astronomer (born 1660)
