= 1767 in science =

The year 1767 in science and technology involved some significant events.

== Agriculture ==
- Arthur Young publishes The farmer's letters to the people of England, containing the sentiments of a practical husbandman ... to which is added, Sylvæ, or, Occasional tracts on husbandry and rural oeconomics.

== Exploration ==
- June 17 – British Royal Navy Captain Samuel Wallis becomes the first European definitely to visit the island of Tahiti in the Pacific Ocean, during HMS Dolphin's second circumnavigation.
- July 3 – Pitcairn Island in the Pacific Ocean is sighted from HMS Swallow (1766) by 15-year-old Midshipman Robert Pitcairn on a British Royal Navy expeditionary voyage commanded by Philip Carteret, the first definite European sighting.
- Autumn – North Carolina woodsman Daniel Boone goes through the Cumberland Gap and reaches Kentucky (in defiance of the Royal Proclamation of 1763). He discovers a rich hunting ground, contested by several Native American tribes.

== Medicine ==
- October 12 – Dr William Watson, at the Foundling Hospital in London, conducts an early planned and controlled clinical trial, selecting 32 boys and girls of similar age who have not yet had smallpox. He divides them into three groups in order to test treatments before inoculation for the disease, with one group receiving a mixture of mercury and jalap, another senna glycoside, and the third getting no pre-treatment at all.
- November 9 – At the new King's College medical school in New York City (later the Columbia University College of Physicians and Surgeons), Dr John Jones gives the first lecture by a surgical professor in North America.

== Technology ==
- January 1 – First annual volume of The Nautical Almanac and Astronomical Ephemeris, produced by British Astronomer Royal Nevil Maskelyne at the Royal Observatory, Greenwich, gives navigators the means to find longitude at sea using tables of lunar distance.
- July 3 – First edition of Adresseavisen, Norway's oldest newspaper remaining in print, is published.
- Coldstream Bridge on the England/Scotland border, designed by John Smeaton, is opened, one of the first long (300 feet (90 m)) bridges with a flat deck.
- Horace-Bénédict de Saussure constructs the first known Western solar oven.
- Joseph Priestley discovers a method of producing carbonated water and publishes The History and Present State of Electricity.

== Awards ==
- Copley Medal: John Ellis

== Births ==
- March 6 – Davies Giddy, English promoter of science (died 1839)
- August 24 – Bernhard Meyer, German physician and ornithologist (died 1836)
- date unknown – Bewick Bridge, English mathematician (died 1833)

== Deaths ==
- February 19 – François Boissier de Sauvages de Lacroix, French physician and botanist (born 1706)
- March 20 – Firmin Abauzit, French scientist (born 1679)
- date unknown – Marie Anne Victoire Pigeon, French mathematician (born 1724)
