= 1743 in philosophy =

1743 in philosophy

== Events ==
- The American Philosophical Society (APS) was founded in 1743.

== Births ==
- William Paley (1743–1805).
- Thomas Jefferson (1743–1826). Liberal political philosopher.
