= 1774 in science =

The year 1774 in science and technology involved some significant events.

== Astronomy ==
- Johann Elert Bode discovers the galaxy Messier 81.
- Lagrange publishes a paper on the motion of the nodes of a planet's orbit.

== Biology ==
- Italian physicist Abbé Bonaventura Corti publishes Osservazioni microscopiche sulla tremella e sulla circulazione del fluido in una pianta acquajuola in Lucca, including his discovery of cyclosis in plant cells.
- French physician Antoine Parmentier publishes Examen chymique des pommes de terres in Paris, analysing the nutritional value of the potato.

== Chemistry ==
- August 1 – Joseph Priestley, working at Bowood House, Wiltshire, England, isolates oxygen in the form of a gas, which he calls "dephlogisticated air".
- Antoine Lavoisier publishes his first book, a literature review on the composition of air, Opuscules physiques et chimiques.
- Carl Wilhelm Scheele discovers "dephlogisticated muriatic acid" (chlorine), manganese and barium.

== Exploration ==
- Second voyage of James Cook
  - June 16/17 – English explorer Captain Cook becomes the first European to sight (and name) Palmerston Island in the Pacific Ocean.
  - September 4 – Cook becomes the first European to sight (and name) the island of New Caledonia in Melanesia.
  - October 10 – Cook becomes the first European to sight (and name) Norfolk Island in the Pacific Ocean, uninhabited at this date.

== Mathematics ==
- P.-S. Laplace publishes Mémoire sur la probabilité des causes par les événements, including a restatement of Bayes' theorem.

== Medicine and physiology ==
- William Hunter's Anatomia uteri humani gravidi tabulis illustrata | The Anatomy of the Human Gravid Uterus exhibited in figures is published by John Baskerville in Birmingham, England.
- Sugita Genpaku's Kaitai Shinsho ("New Text on Anatomy"), based on a Dutch publication, is published with illustrations in Japan, the first modern anatomy textbook produced there.

== Physics ==
- The Schiehallion experiment is carried out by Nevil Maskelyne to determine the mean density of the Earth.

== Technology ==
- January 27 – John Wilkinson patents a method for boring cannon from the solid, subsequently utilised for accurate boring of steam engine cylinders.
- Jesse Ramsden produces an advanced circular dividing engine with the support of the Board of Longitude.

== Awards ==
- Copley Medal: Not awarded

== Births ==
- April 21 – Jean-Baptiste Biot (died 1862), French physicist.
- April 24 – Jean Marc Gaspard Itard (died 1838), French otorhinolaryngologist.
- April 28 – Francis Baily (died 1844), English astronomer.
- May 7 – Francis Beaufort (died 1856), Irish-born hydrographer.
- May 28 – Edward Howard (died 1816), English chemist.
- August 18 – Meriwether Lewis (died 1809), American explorer.
- September 26 – John Chapman (died 1845), American nurseryman.
- November 12 – Charles Bell (died 1842), Scottish-born anatomist.
- December 12 – William Henry (died 1836), English chemist.

== Deaths ==
- February 4 – Charles Marie de La Condamine, French geographer (born 1701)
- May 1 – William Hewson, English surgeon, anatomist and physiologist, "father of haematology" (born 1739)
- July 9 – Anna Morandi Manzolini, Italian anatomist (born 1714)
