= 1761 in science =

The year 1761 in science and technology involved some significant events, listed below.

== Astronomy ==
- June 6 – The first transit of Venus since Edmond Halley suggested that its observation could determine the distance from the Earth to the Sun. Joseph-Nicolas Delisle set up a 62-station network for observing the transit. Those taking part included:
  - Nathaniel Bliss at the Royal Greenwich Observatory near London
  - César Cassini de Thury in Vienna
  - Jean-Baptiste Chappe d'Auteroche in Tobolsk, Siberia
  - Jeremiah Dixon and Charles Mason in Cape Town, South Africa (they had originally planned to go to Bengcoolen, Sumatra)
  - Maximilian Hell in Vardø, Norway
  - Joseph de Lalande in Paris
  - Tobias Mayer in Göttingen
  - Nevil Maskelyne on Saint Helena
  - Alexandre Pingré on Rodrigues Island (where he makes the last record of the Rodrigues parrot)
  - John Winthrop in St. John's, Newfoundland
  - Mikhail Lomonosov, who finds the first evidence that the planet has an atmosphere

Guillaume Le Gentil, who had hoped to observe from Pondicherry in India, is prevented from doing so due to the Seven Years' War and Ruđer Bošković arrives late in Constantinople.

== Botany ==
- Louis Gérard publishes Flora Gallo-Provincialis, the first flora arranged according to natural classification.

== Chemistry ==
- Johan Gottschalk Wallerius publishes his pioneering work in agricultural chemistry, Agriculturae fundamenta chemica (Åkerbrukets chemiska grunder).

== Mathematics ==
- Johann Heinrich Lambert gives a proof that π is irrational.

== Medicine ==
- Leopold Auenbrugger publishes Novum ex Percussione Thoracis Humani Interni Pectoris Morbos Detegendi in Vienna, for the first time advocating percussion of the chest as a diagnostic measure.
- Giovanni Battista Morgagni publishes De Sedibus et causis morborum per anatomem indagatis ("Of the seats and causes of diseases investigated through anatomy", published in Venice), a pioneering work of anatomical pathology.
- Samuel-Auguste Tissot publishes Avis au peuple sur sa santé, a popular text of the century.

=== Veterinary medicine ===
- August 4 – Claude Bourgelat founds the first veterinary school, in Lyon; courses begin in 1762.

== Technology ==
- Opening of Matthew Boulton's Soho Manufactory in England.
- The British Royal Navy first experiments with the copper sheathing of its warship hulls.

== Awards ==
- Copley Medal: not awarded

== Births ==
- January 17 – James Hall (died 1832), Scottish geologist and physicist.
- January 19 – Pierre Marie Auguste Broussonet (died 1807), French naturalist and physician.
- February 1 – Christiaan Hendrik Persoon (died 1836), South African-born Pomeranian/Dutch mycologist.
- February 4 – Blasius Merrem (died 1824), German zoologist.
- June 7 – John Rennie (died 1821), Scottish-born civil engineer.
- October 27 – Matthew Baillie (died 1823), Scottish-born pathologist.
- November 30 – Smithson Tennant (died 1815), English chemist.
- December 21 – Jean-Louis Pons (died 1831), French astronomer.
- December 25 – William Gregor (died 1817), Cornish mineralogist.

== Deaths ==
- January 4 – Stephen Hales (born 1677), English physiologist and clergyman.
- March 21 – Pierre Fauchard (born 1679), French physician and "father of modern dentistry".
- April 7 – Thomas Bayes (born c. 1702), English mathematician.
- May 14 – Thomas Simpson (born 1710), British mathematician.
- November – Giovanni Poleni (born c. 1683), Italian mathematician and physicist.
- November 30 – John Dollond (born 1706), English optician.
