= 1794 in science =

The year 1794 in science and technology involved some significant events.

== Anatomy ==
- Antonio Scarpa publishes Tabulae neurologicae ad illustrandam historiam cardiacorum nervorum, noni nervorum cerebri, glossopharingei et pharingei, the first work to give an accurate depiction of cardiac innervation, and to include the discovery that the inner ear is filled with fluid.

== Astronomy ==
- Ernst Chladni publishes Über den Ursprung der von Pallas gefundenen und anderer ihr ähnlicher Eisenmassen und über einige damit in Verbindung stehende Naturerscheinungen ("On the Origin of the Pallas Iron and Others Similar to it, and on Some Associated Natural Phenomena") in which he proposes that meteorites have their origins in outer space.
- Completion of the Radcliffe Observatory for the University of Oxford, Thomas Hornsby being the first observer.

== Biology ==
- Erasmus Darwin publishes the first edition of Zoonomia, a medical work in two volumes that touches upon proto-evolutionary concepts, notably arguing that all extant organisms are descended from one common ancestor. The work will later influence his grandson, Charles Darwin.
- Lazzaro Spallanzani publishes his conclusion that bats use a means other than sight for locating themselves in darkness.

== Mathematics ==
- Adrien-Marie Legendre publishes Éléments de géométrie, which becomes a popular textbook for many years.
- Jurij Vega publishes Thesaurus Logarithmorum Completus, a book of mathematical tables which reaches its 90th edition in 1924.

== Physiology and medicine ==
- October 31 – John Dalton delivers a pioneering paper on colour blindness (a condition which he inherited) to the Manchester Literary and Philosophical Society in England a few weeks after joining.
- December – Glasgow Royal Infirmary first opens in Scotland.
- Thomas Beddoes with James Watt publish Considerations on the Medicinal Use and on the Production of Factitious Airs in Bristol.

== Technology ==
- March 14 – Eli Whitney receives a patent for his cotton gin in the United States.
- Journal des Mines first published in Paris by l'Agence des mines de la République.

== Institutions ==
- The École centrale des travaux publics is founded by Lazare Carnot and Gaspard Monge in Paris under the National Convention in Revolutionary France; a year later it becomes the École Polytechnique.
- The Musée des Arts et Métiers is established in Paris.

== Awards ==
- Copley Medal: Alessandro Volta

== Births ==
- January 7 – Eilhard Mitscherlich, German chemist (died 1863)
- February 8 – Friedlieb Ferdinand Runge, German analytical chemist (died 1867)
- May 24 – William Whewell, English natural philosopher (died 1866)
- May 29 – Johann Heinrich von Mädler, German astronomer (died 1874)
- August 15 – Elias Magnus Fries, Swedish botanist (died 1878)
- September 24 – Jeanne Villepreux-Power, French marine biologist (died 1871)
- October 6 – Charles Wilkins Short, American botanist (died 1863)
- October 28 – Robert Liston, Scottish surgeon (died 1847)
- December 31 – Pierre Adolphe Piorry, French physician (died 1879)
- Ferdinand Deppe, German naturalist, explorer and painter (died 1861)
- Friedrich Freese, German botanist (died 1878)

== Deaths ==
- February 22 – Caspar Friedrich Wolff, German physiologist (born 1733)
- February 27 – Jean-Rodolphe Perronet, French bridge engineer (born 1708)
- March 29 – Marquis de Condorcet, French mathematician (born 1743) (in prison)
- May 8 – Antoine Lavoisier, French chemist (born 1743) (guillotined)
- October 28 – John Smeaton, English civil engineer (born 1724)
- Date unknown – Jacques Anselme Dorthès, French physician, entomologist and naturalist (born 1759) (on military service)
