= Mårten Triewald =

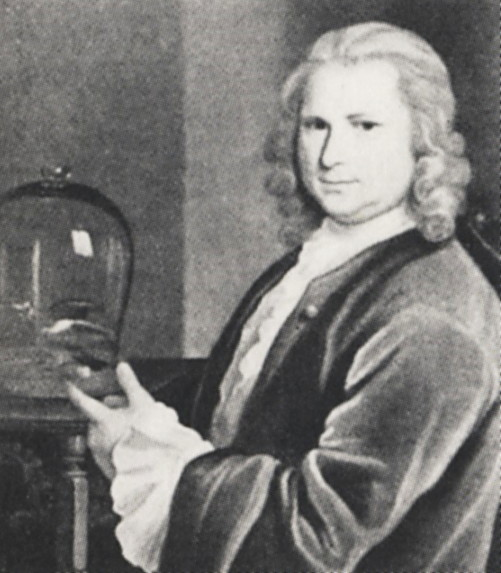
Mårten Triewald in 1740

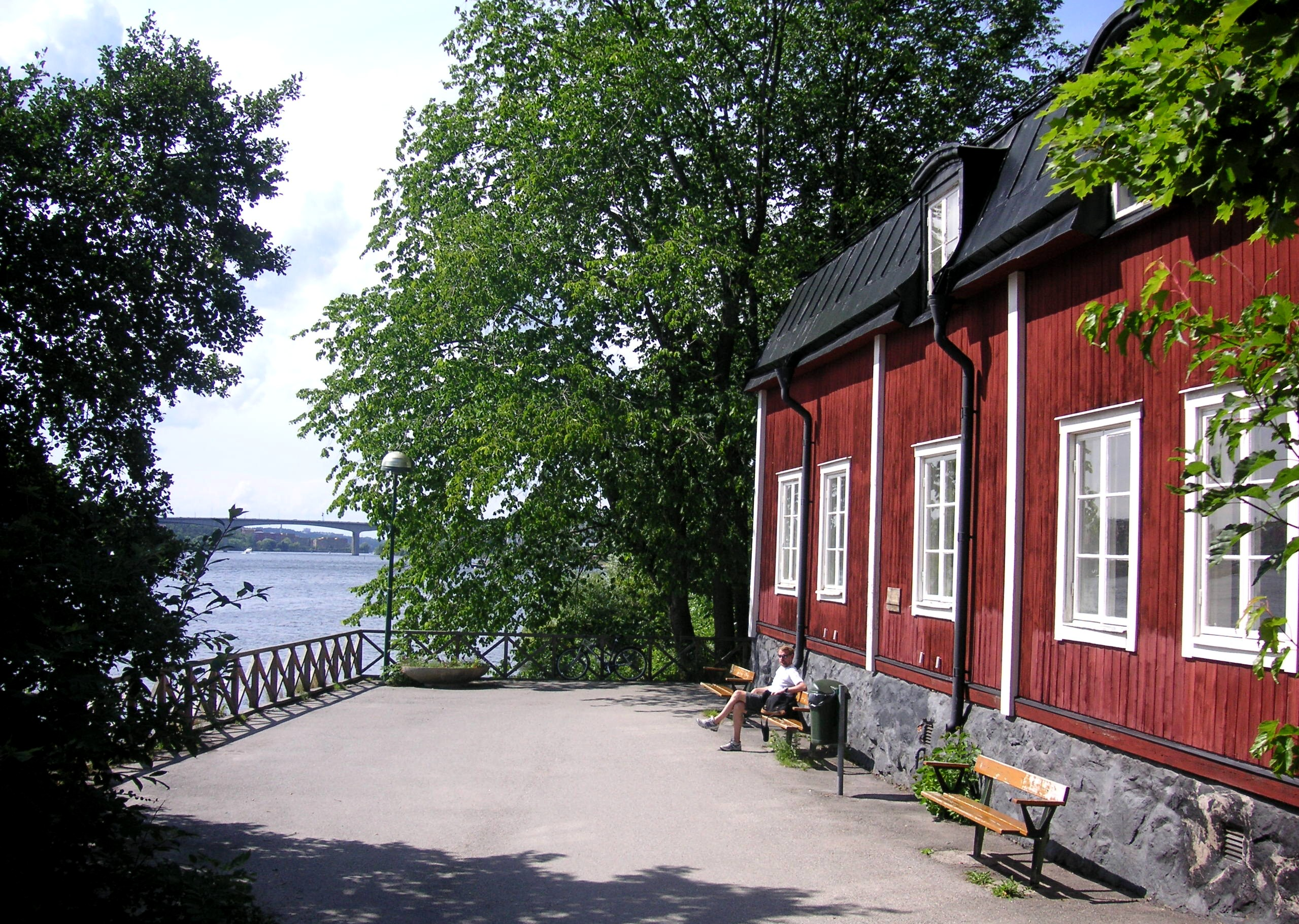
Triewalds malmgård in 2008, the mansion owned by Triewald 1739–1747.

Mårten Triewald FRS (18 November 1691 – 8 August 1747), sometimes referred to as Mårten Triewald the Younger, was a Swedish merchant, engineer and amateur physicist.

Mårten Triewald was the son of Mårten Triewald the Elder, a farrier and anchorsmith of German origin.

Triewald's mercantile activities took him to London where he attended lectures in Newtonian Experimental Philosophy given by John Theophilus Desaguliers and with whom he later corresponded. In 1716 Triewald was employed as an inspector at a coal mine in Newcastle, where he studied mechanics and the steam engines used there, and made improvements to them. He returned to Sweden in 1726 and at Dannemora mine and built a steam engine there under the designation "fire and air machine" (eld- och luftmachin in archaic Swedish). This steam engine is believed to be the first steam engine in Sweden that was put to practical and industrial use.

In 1728 and 1729 Triewald held lectures in mechanics at the Swedish House of Nobility, and demonstrated a collection of physical instruments that he had bought in England. In 1732, these instruments were taken over by Lund University, and Triewald's assistant Daniel Menlös was made a professor of mathematics at the university. In 1729 he formed a diving company, and wrote about the use of diving bells and equipment for divers under the title Konsten att lefa under watn ("The art of living under water"). He also took an interest in bee-keeping and published on this subject (Tractat om bij, 1728).

Triewald was given the title director mechanicus, and in 1735 was appointed kapten-mekanikus (Captain of Mechanics) at the Fortification Administration, deemed to be "the only one in the country suitable for this post", and given an annual pension by the Parliament.

In 1729, he was elected a member of the Royal Society of Sciences in Uppsala. In 1739, he was one of six founders of the Royal Swedish Academy of Sciences in Stockholm. He was also elected a Fellow of the Royal Society in 1731.

The mansion located in the southwestern part of Kungsholmen that Triewald bought in 1739, Triewalds malmgård, still exists and carries his name.

Marten Triewalds daughter Margaret Elisabeth was married to accountant Johan Falkensson (died 1779) who leased Hersbyholm on Lidingö

Mårten Triewald had a brother named Samuel von Triewald, who was a poet, politician and one of the first 'critics' in Sweden. He was also a member of the Royal Swedish Academy of Sciences.

== See also ==
- Triewaldsgränd
