= Clément Joseph Tissot =

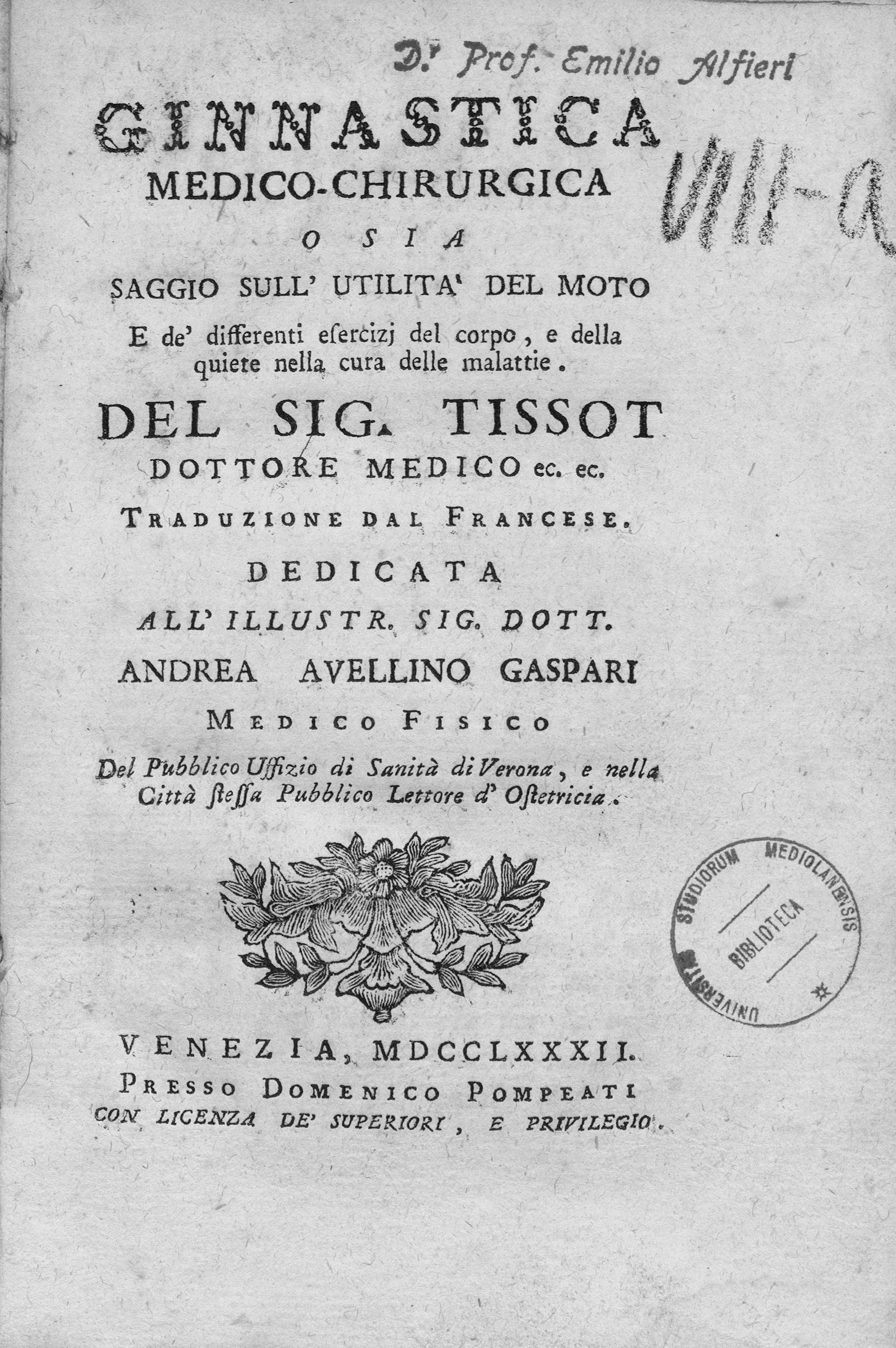
Gymnastique médicinale et chirurgicale, 1782

Clément Joseph Tissot (English: /tiːˈsoʊ/ tee-SOH, French: [klemɑ̃ ʒozɛf tiso]; 1747 – 1826) was a French medical doctor and a physiotherapist. He introduced remedial gymnastics as a treatment for orthopedic and surgical pathologies.

== Life ==
Born in Ornans in 1747, he was the son of a pharmacist from Besançon, where he studied medicine. In 1777 he joined the French Army as a surgeon. Soon, in contrast to the traditional immobilization technique, he introduced remedial gymnastics.

In 1780 he published his own ideas about physiotherapy, obtaining considerable attentions and honors. After the French Revolution he lost his job at court and was briefly imprisoned. Then he worked as an Assistant Medical and Surgical Director in the Napoleonic Army. He lived in Paris until his death in 1826.

== Works ==
- French original edition:
  - Tissot, Clement Joseph (1780). Gymnastique médicinale et chirurgicale (in French). Paris: Bastien.,
- Italien translation:
  - Tissot, Clement Joseph (1782). Gymnastique médicinale et chirurgicale [ita] (in Italian). Venezia: presso Domenico Pompeati.
