= 1814 in science =

The year 1814 in science and technology involved some significant events, listed below.

== Chemistry ==
- J. Jacob Berzelius publishes Försök att genom användandet af den electrokemiska theorien och de kemiska proportionerna grundlägga ett rent vettenskapligt system för mineralogien ("An attempt to establish a pure scientific system of mineralogy, by the application of the electro-chemical theory and the chemical proportions").
- The copper(II) acetate triarsenite (or copper(II) acetoarsenite) pigment later known as Paris green is produced by paint manufacturers Wilhelm Sattler and Friedrich Russ, in Schweinfurt, Germany, for the Wilhelm Dye and White Lead Company.

== Mathematics ==
- Peter Barlow publishes New Mathematical Tables and A New Mathematical and Philosophical Dictionary. 'Barlow's Tables' continue to be reprinted for 150 years.

== Meteorology ==
- August – William Charles Wells publishes the first correct scientific explanation of dew.

== Medicine ==
- April – Abraham Colles publishes "On the Fracture of the Carpal Extremity of the Radius" in the Edinburgh Medical and Surgical Journal, describing the injury which continues to be known as Colles' fracture.
- October 23 – Joseph Carpue performs plastic surgery on the nose.

== Physics ==
- 'Laplace's demon', an articulation of causal determinism, is published by Pierre-Simon Laplace.
- Joseph von Fraunhofer discovers the dark absorption lines in the spectrum of the sun now known as Fraunhofer lines.

== Technology ==
- July 25 – George Stephenson puts his first steam locomotive in service, the Blücher for Killingworth Colliery on Tyneside in England.
- Late – Completion of the Boston Manufacturing Company's integrated cotton weaving mill on the Charles River at Waltham, Massachusetts, engineered by Paul Moody for Francis Cabot Lowell and 'The Boston Associates', and inaugurating the Waltham-Lowell system of manufacturing.
- "The world's first complex machine mass-produced from interchangeable parts", Eli Terry's wooden pillar-and-scroll clock, comes off the production line in Plymouth, Connecticut.
- James Fox invents a modern planing machine in England at about this date, but the priority between Fox, Matthew Murray of Leeds and Richard Roberts of Manchester cannot be certainly established.
- Heinrich Stölzel invents a form of piston valve for brass instruments.
- Dietrich Nikolaus Winkel invents a form of metronome in Amsterdam.

== Awards ==
- Copley Medal: James Ivory

== Births ==
- February 28 – Edmond Frémy, French chemist (died 1894).
- April 20 – Filippo de Filippi, Italian zoologist (died 1867).
- May 19 – Henry William Ravenel, American botanist (died 1887).
- May 22 – Joseph-Louis Lambot, French inventor of ferrocement (died 1887).
- May 26
  - Wilhelm Engerth, Austrian architect and engineer (died 1884).
  - Heinrich Geißler, German scientific instrument maker (died 1879).
- July 19 – Samuel Colt, American gunmaker (died 1862).
- September 3 – James Joseph Sylvester, English mathematician (died 1897).
- November 6 – Adolphe Sax, Belgian musical instrument maker and inventor (died 1894).
- December 9 – Golding Bird, English physician (died 1854)
- December 13 – Ana Néri, Brazilian nurse (died 1880).
- December 28 – John Bennet Lawes, English agricultural scientist (died 1900).

== Deaths ==
- July 19 – Captain Matthew Flinders, English explorer of the coasts of Australia (born 1774)
- August 21 – Sir Benjamin Thompson, Count Rumford, Anglo-American physicist (born 1753).
- November 18 – William Jessop, English civil engineer (born 1745).
- December 9 – Joseph Bramah, English inventor (born 1748).
