= 1799 in science =

The year 1799 in science and technology involved many significant events, listed below.

== Archaeology ==
- July 15 – In the Egyptian port city of Rosetta (Rashid), French Captain Pierre Bouchard finds the Rosetta Stone, which will become the key to deciphering ancient Egyptian hieroglyphic writing.
- July 25 – At the Battle of Abukir in Egypt, Napoleon Bonaparte gains French control of Egyptian artifacts by defeating over 10,000 Ottoman Mamluk troops under Mustafa Pasha.

== Astronomy ==
- Pierre-Simon Laplace begins publication of Méchanique céleste.

== Biology ==
- Thomas Beddoes makes the first recorded use of the word Biology in its modern sense.
- George Shaw of the British Museum publishes the first scientific description of the platypus (Ornithorhynchus anatinus Shaw) in The Naturalists' Miscellany.

== Exploration ==
- Alexander von Humboldt and Aimé Bonpland begin a five-year exploration of the natural history of South America.

== Geology ==
- by summer – William Smith produces the first large-scale geological map, of the area round Bath, Somerset, England.
- December 11 – Smith draws up a table of strata round Bath.

== History of science ==
- Benjamin Hutchinson publishes Biographia Medica in London, the first English language historical dictionary of international medical biography.

== Mathematics ==
- Paolo Ruffini partially proves the Abel–Ruffini theorem that quintic or higher-order equations cannot be solved by a general formula.
- William Wallace becomes the first to publish the concept of the Simson line.

== Medicine ==
- March – The Pneumatic Institution for research into the medical implications of newly discovered gases is established by Thomas Beddoes in Bristol.
- Caleb Parry publishes An Inquiry Into the Symptoms and Causes of the Syncope Anginosa Commonly Called Angina Pectoris, illustrated by Dissections, describing the mechanisms for Angina.
- Maria Dalle Donne becomes the first female Doctor of Medicine, at the University of Bologna.
- Matthew Baillie begins publication in London of A Series of Engravings, Accompanied with Explanations, which are Intended to Illustrate the Morbid Anatomy of Some of the Most Important Parts of the Human Body, the first comprehensive atlas of pathology as a separate subject.

== Metrology ==
- An all-platinum kilogramme prototype is fabricated with the objective of equalling as closely as feasible the mass of one cubic decimetre of water at 4 °C. The prototype is presented to the Archives of the French Republic in June and on December 10 is formally ratified as the Kilogramme des Archives and the kilogramme defined as being equal to its mass. This standard holds for the next ninety years.

== Mineralogy ==
- Twelve-year-old Conrad John Reed finds what he described as a "heavy yellow rock" along Little Meadow Creek in Cabarrus County, North Carolina, and makes it a doorstop in his home. Conrad's father, John Reed, learns that the rock is actually gold in 1802, initiating the first gold rush in the United States.

== Paleontology ==
- Vice President of the United States Thomas Jefferson, writing in Transactions of the American Philosophical Society 4, describes the bones of Megalonyx jeffersonii, an extinct ground sloth.

== Physics ==
- Annalen der Physik first published.

== Technology ==
- Eli Whitney, holding a January 1798 United States government contract for the manufacture of muskets, is introduced by Oliver Wolcott Jr. to the French concept of interchangeable parts, an origin of the American system of manufacturing.

== Awards ==
- Copley Medal: John Hellins

== Births ==
- January – James Meadows Rendel, English civil engineer (died 1856)
- January 12 – Priscilla Susan Bury, British botanist (died 1872)
- March 16 – Anna Atkins, British botanist (died 1871)
- May 21 – Mary Anning, English paleontologist (died 1847)
- June 3 – Elisabetta Fiorini Mazzanti, Italian botanist (died 1879)
- June 18
  - William Lassell, English astronomer (died 1880)
  - Prosper Ménière, French physician (died 1862)
- June 25 – David Douglas, Scottish-born botanist (died 1834)
- September 8 – James Bowman Lindsay, Scottish inventor (died 1862)
- December 20 – Nicholas Callan, Irish physicist (died 1864)
- December (prob.) – Maria Ann Sherwood, English-born horticulturalist (died 1870)
- Undated
  - Petrache Poenaru, Romanian inventor (died 1875)
  - John Stringfellow, English pioneer of heavier-than-air flight (died 1883)

== Deaths ==
- January 17 – Maria Gaetana Agnesi, Italian mathematician (born 1718)
- January 22 – Horace-Bénédict de Saussure, Genevan pioneer of Alpine studies (born 1740)
- February 12 – Lazzaro Spallanzani, Italian physiologist (born 1729)
- February 18 – Johann Hedwig, German bryologist (born 1730)
- February 19 – Jean-Charles de Borda, French mathematician and physicist (born 1733)
- June 4 – Philip Woodroffe, Irish surgeon
- July 7 – William Curtis, English botanist and entomologist (born 1747)
- August 2 – Jacques Étienne Montgolfier, French inventor (born 1745)
- August 25 – John Arnold, English watchmaker (born 1736)
- September 7 – Jan Ingenhousz, Dutch physiologist (born 1730)
- October 6 – William Withering, English physician, discoverer of digitalis (born 1741)
- December 6 – Joseph Black, Scottish chemist and physicist (born 1728)
- December 31 – Louis-Jean-Marie Daubenton, French naturalist (born 1716)
