= 1826 in science =

The year 1826 in science and technology involved some significant events, listed below.

== Astronomy ==
- Mary Somerville presents a paper on "The Magnetic Properties of the Violet Rays of the Solar Spectrum" to the Royal Society in London.

== Chemistry ==
- Otto Unverdorben first isolates aniline, by destructive distillation of indigo; he calls it Crystallin.
- Antoine Jerome Balard isolates bromine.
- Pierre Jean Robiquet isolates the dye alizarin.
- Michael Faraday determines the chemical formula of naphthalene.

== Exploration ==
- May 22 – HMS Beagle departs on her first voyage from Plymouth for a hydrographic survey of the Patagonia and Tierra del Fuego regions of South America.
- Hyacinthe de Bougainville completes a three-year global circumnavigation.

== Mathematics ==
- Journal für die reine und angewandte Mathematik is founded by August Leopold Crelle in Berlin.
- February 23 – Nikolai Lobachevsky first presents his system of non-Euclidean hyperbolic geometry.

== Physiology and medicine ==
- Johannes Peter Müller publishes his first important works, Zur vergleichenden Physiologie des Gesichtsinns ("On the comparative physiology of sight", Leipzig) and Über die phantastischen Gesichtserscheinungen ("On visual hallucination", Coblenz), making a first statement of the law of specific nerve energies.

== Technology ==
- January 30 – The Menai Suspension Bridge, built by engineer Thomas Telford, is opened between the island of Anglesey and the mainland of Wales.
- April 1 – American inventor Samuel Morey patents a compressionless internal combustion engine in the United States.
- June – Nicéphore Niépce produces the first photograph, View from the Window at Le Gras.
- Benoit Fourneyron develops an efficient outward-flow water turbine.
- James Sharp of Northampton in England patents a practical form of gas stove.

== Zoology ==
- Karl Ernst von Baer discovers the mammalian ovum.
- The Austrian zoologist Johann Nepomuk Meyer first describes the Asiatic lion under the name Felis leo persicus.
- The Zoological Society of London is founded by Sir Thomas Stamford Raffles.

== Awards ==
- Copley Medal: James South

== Births ==
- January 15 – Marie Pasteur (died 1910), French chemist.
- May 26 – Richard Carrington (died 1875), English astronomer.
- June 26 – Morgan Crofton (died 1915), Irish mathematician.
- July 7 – John Fowler (died 1864), English agricultural engineer.
- July 13 – Stanislao Cannizzaro (died 1910), Italian chemist.
- August 21 – Carl Gegenbaur (died 1903), German anatomist.
- September 17 – Bernhard Riemann (died 1866), German mathematician.
- October 8 – Emily Blackwell (died 1910), American physician.
- Alphonse de Polignac (died 1863), French mathematician.

== Deaths ==
- January 3 – Marie Le Masson Le Golft (born 1750), French naturalist.
- January 6 – John Farey (born 1766), English geologist.
- March 28 - Jean-Baptiste Dumangin (born 1744), French physician.
- June 7 – Joseph von Fraunhofer (born 1787), German physicist.
- June 30 - Clément Joseph Tissot (born 1747), French physician and physiotherapist.
- July 4 – Thomas Jefferson (born 1743), Founding Father and 3rd President of the United States and inventor.
- July 22 – Giuseppe Piazzi (born 1746), Italian astronomer.
- August 13 - René Laennec (born 1781), French physician and musician.
- September 6 - Andrea Vaccà Berlinghieri (born 1772), Italian surgeon.
- October 25 – Philippe Pinel (born 1745), French psychiatrist.
- November 23 – Johann Elert Bode (born 1747), German astronomer.
- November 24 - Clarke Abel (born 1780), British surgeon and naturalist.
