= 1817 in science =

The year 1817 in science and technology involved some significant events, listed below.

== Biology ==
- Georges Cuvier publishes Le Règne Animal.

== Chemistry ==
- Discovery of cadmium by Friedrich Stromeyer.
- Discovery of lithium by Johann Arfvedson.
- Discovery of selenium by Jöns Jakob Berzelius.
- Pierre-Joseph Pelletier and Joseph Bienaimé Caventou isolate chlorophyll and emetine.
- Leopold Gmelin begins publication of his Handbuch der theoretischen Chemie.

== Medicine ==
- First cholera pandemic (1817–24) originates in Bengal, reaching Calcutta by September.
- James Parkinson publishes An Essay on the Shaking Palsy, describing "paralysis agitans", the condition which will become known as Parkinson's disease.

== Technology ==
- March – Ackermann steering geometry invented by Georg Lankensperger.
- June 12 – German inventor Karl Drais drives his dandy horse ("Draisine" or Laufmaschine), the earliest form of bicycle, in Mannheim.
- July 10 – David Brewster patents the kaleidoscope.

== Institutions ==
- October 1 – Philomaths established secretly by Poles at the Imperial University of Vilnius.

== Awards ==
- Copley Medal: Henry Kater

== Births ==
- January 29 – William Ferrel (died 1891), American meteorologist.
- February 15 – Robert Angus Smith (died 1884), Scottish-born atmospheric chemist.
- April 8 – Charles-Édouard Brown-Séquard (died 1894), Mauritian-born physiologist and neurologist.
- May 31 – Joseph Marie Élisabeth Durocher (died 1860), French geologist.
- June 30 – Joseph Dalton Hooker (died 1911), English botanist.
- July 5 – Carl Vogt (died 1895), German scientist who publishes notable works in zoology, geology and physiology.
- July 15 – John Fowler (died 1898), English civil engineer.
- September 10 – Richard Spruce (died 1893), English botanist.
- October 10 – C. H. D. Buys Ballot (died 1890), Dutch meteorologist.
- October 17 – Alfred Des Cloizeaux (died 1897), French mineralogist.
- November 26 – Charles-Adolphe Wurtz (died 1884), Alsatian French chemist.
- December 13 – Arthur Hill Hassall (died 1894), English physician, microbiologist and chemical analyst.
- December 14 – Sophia Wilkens (died 1889), Swedish pioneer in the education of students with intellectual disability.

== Deaths ==
- January 1 – Martin Heinrich Klaproth (born 1743), German chemist.
- April 12 – Charles Messier (born 1730), French astronomer.
- May 12 – William Goforth (born 1766), American physician and paleontologist.
- June 2 – Clotilde Tambroni, Italian philologist and linguist (born 1758)
- June 11 – William Gregor (born 1761), Cornish mineralogist.
- July 28 – Abraham Gottlob Werner (born 1749), German geologist.
- August 7 – Pierre Samuel du Pont de Nemours (born 1739), French-born American industrialist.
- September 18 – William Charles Wells (born 1757), American physician.
- November 7 – Jean-André Deluc (born 1727), Swiss geologist.
- December 15 – Abate Giovanni Battista Guglielmini (born 1763), Bolognese physicist.
