= 1734 in science =

The year 1734 in science and technology involved some significant events.

== Mathematics ==
- George Berkeley publishes The Analyst, an empiricist critique of the foundations of infinitesimal calculus, influential in the development of mathematics.
- Leonhard Euler introduces the integrating factor technique for solving first-order ordinary differential equations.

== Technology ==
- James Short constructs a Gregorian reflecting telescope with an aperture of 14 inches (36 cm).

== Zoology ==
- René Antoine Ferchault de Réaumur begins publication of Mémoires pour servir à l'histoire des insectes in Amsterdam.

== Awards ==
- Copley Medal: John Theophilus Desaguliers

== Births ==
- January 23 – Wolfgang von Kempelen, Hungarian inventor (died 1804)
- April 18 – Elsa Beata Bunge, Swedish botanist (died 1819)
- May 23 – Franz Mesmer, German physician (died 1815)
- September 3 – Joseph Wright, English painter of scientific subjects (died 1797)

== Deaths ==
- February 1 – John Floyer, English physician (born 1649)
- April 25 – Johann Konrad Dippel, German theologian, alchemist and physician (born 1673)
