= 1816 in science =

The year 1816 in science and technology involved some significant events, listed below.

== Botany ==
- Botanic Gardens, Sydney, established in Australia.

== Chemistry ==
- Veuve Clicquot invents the riddling table process to clarify champagne.

== Mathematics ==
- John Farey notes the Farey sequence.

== Medicine ==
- René Laennec invents the stethoscope.
- Caleb Parry publishes An Experimental Inquiry into the Nature, Cause and Varieties of the Arterial Pulse, describing the mechanisms for the pulse.

== Mineralogy ==
- Johann Fischer von Waldheim publishes Essai sur la Turquoise et sur la Calaite in Moscow, the first scientific treatise on the mineral turquoise.

== Physics ==
- Sir David Brewster (1781–1868) discovers stress birefringence.

== Technology ==
- January 9 – Sir Humphry Davy's Davy lamp is first tested underground as a coal mining safety lamp at Hebburn Colliery in north east England.
- The Spider Bridge at Falls of Schuylkill, a temporary iron-wire footbridge erected across the Schuylkill River, north of Philadelphia, Pennsylvania, is the first wire-cable suspension bridge in history.
- Johann Nepomuk Maelzel begins production of the metronome with a scale.
- Rev. Robert Stirling obtains a patent in the United Kingdom for the Stirling hot air engine.
- English inventor Francis Ronalds demonstrates the practicability of the electric telegraph but it is rejected as "wholly unnecessary" at this time.
- approx. date – Simeon North in New England produces a practicable milling machine for working metal.

== Awards ==
- Copley Medal: Not awarded

== Births ==
- January 2 – Anastasie Fătu, Moldavian and Romanian physician and naturalist (died 1886)
- July 7 – Rudolf Wolf, Swiss astronomer (died 1893)
- July 20 – Sir William Bowman, 1st Baronet, English ophthalmologist, histologist and anatomist (died 1892)
- December 13 – Werner Siemens, German electrical engineer (died 1892)

== Deaths ==
- January 2 – Louis-Bernard Guyton de Morveau, French chemist (born 1737)
- April 7 – Christian Konrad Sprengel, German botanist (born 1750)
- September 18 – Bernard McMahon, Irish American horticulturalist (born c. 1775)
- September 28 – Edward Howard, English chemist (born 1774)
- December 15 – Charles Stanhope, 3rd Earl Stanhope, English engineer (born 1753)
