= 1828 in science =

“Monster Soup, commonly called Thames Water" by William Heath Wellcome, bringing awareness to harmful microorganisms in the London Water

The year 1828 in science and technology involved some significant events, listed below.

== Astronomy ==
- Félix Savary computes the first orbit of a visual double star when he calculates the orbit of the double star Xi Ursae Majoris.

== Biology ==
- April 18 – Ornithologist Carl Julian (von) Graba lands in the little-studied Faroe Islands for a 3-month visit to research the bird life.
- April 27 – London Zoo opens in Regent's Park for members of the Zoological Society of London, the first scientific zoo in the United Kingdom.
- October 26 – English naturalist and explorer William John Burchell collects the only known specimen of Parabouchetia brasiliensis, an exceptionally rare member of the nightshade family Solanaceae, in central Brazil.
- Karl Ernst von Baer lays the foundations of the science of comparative embryology with his book Über Entwickelungsgeschichte der Thiere. He publishes von Baer's laws.
- Martin Lichtenstein publishes a monograph on the Dipodidae, Über die Springmäuse, in Berlin.
- Belfast Botanic Gardens open.

== Chemistry ==
- Swedish chemist Jöns Jakob Berzelius produces a table of atomic weights and discovers thorium.
- Urea becomes the first organic compound to be artificially synthesised, by Friedrich Wöhler, establishing that organic compounds could be produced from inorganic starting materials and potentially disproving a cornerstone of vitalism, the belief that life is not subject to the laws of science in the way inanimate objects are.
- The van Houten family of the Netherlands invent a press to remove about 50% of the cocoa butter from chocolate.

== Medicine ==
- February 19 – The Boston Society for Medical Improvement is established in the United States.
- April 17 – Royal Free Hospital, established as the London General Institution for the Gratuitous Care of Malignant Diseases by surgeon William Marsden, opens.
- December 20 – The U.S. State of Georgia legislature charters the Medical Academy of Georgia, which becomes the Medical College of Georgia, and authorizes it to award a Bachelor of Medicine degree, making it the 13th oldest U.S. medical school and the 6th public medical school to be established.
- December 24 – Burke and Hare murders: William Burke is sentenced to hang for his part in the murder of 17 victims to provide bodies for dissection by Edinburgh anatomist Robert Knox.
- F. Maury publishes Traité Complet de l'Art du Dentiste, the first handbook of dentistry.

== Paleontology ==
- January 7 – Rev. Henry Duncan describes his discovery of the fossil footmarks of quadrupeds (Chelichnus duncani) in Permian red sandstone in south west Scotland, the first scientific report of a fossil track.
- December – Mary Anning discovers Britain's first pterosaur fossil at Lyme Regis on the Jurassic Coast of England.
- Adolphe Theodore Brongniart publishes Prodrome d'une histoire des Végétaux Fossils, a study of fossil plants.

== Physics ==
- Self-taught English mathematician George Green publishes An Essay on the Application of Mathematical Analysis to the Theories of Electricity and Magnetism in Nottingham, the first mathematical theory of electricity and magnetism, introducing a form of divergence theorem (a version of Green's theorem), the idea of potential theory, and the concept of what will come to be called Green's functions.
- Irish astronomer William Rowan Hamilton publishes Theory of Systems of Rays.

== Technology ==
- October 1 – James Beaumont Neilson of Scotland patents the hot blast process for ironmaking.
- Ányos Jedlik creates the world's first electric motor.
- The brothers John and Charles Deane produce the first diving helmet by adaptation of a smoke helmet produced for them by Augustus Siebe.
- Scottish architect Peter Nicholson sets out a method of preparing stones for construction of a helicoidal skew arch.
- John Deats obtains his first United States patent for an improved plow.

== Institutions ==
- Imperial Petersburg Institute of Technology established in the Russian Empire.

== Awards ==
- Copley Medal: not awarded

== Births ==
- April 17
  - Sampson Gamgee (died 1886), Tuscan-born English surgeon.
  - Johanna Mestorf (died 1909), German prehistoric archaeologist.
- March 12 – Benjamin Leigh Smith (died 1913), English Arctic explorer.
- March 24 – Jules Verne (died 1905), French science fiction author.
- April 29 – Étienne Stéphane Tarnier (died 1897), French obstetrician.
- May 8 – Jean Henri Dunant (died 1910), Swiss founder of the Red Cross.
- June 21 – Ferdinand André Fouqué (died 1904), French geologist and petrologist.
- July 23 – Jonathan Hutchinson (died 1913), English physician.
- August 6 – Andrew Taylor Still (died 1917), American "father of osteopathy".
- August 28 – William A. Hammond (died 1900), American military physician and neurologist.
- September 15 – Aleksandr Butlerov (died 1886), Russian chemist.
- October 31 – Joseph Swan (died 1914), English surgeon.
- November 22 – Lydia Shackleton (died 1914), Irish botanical artist.

== Deaths ==
- March 17 – James Edward Smith (born 1759), English botanist.
- March 23 – David Friesenhausen (born 1756), German-Hungarian-Jewish rabbi, mathematician and astronomer.
- July 5 – Andrew Duncan (born 1744), Scottish physician.
- August 8 – Carl Peter Thunberg (born 1743), Swedish botanist.
- August 22 – Franz Joseph Gall (born 1758), German-born neuroanatomist.
- September 3 - Jean Boniface Textoris (born 1773), French military surgeon.
- December 22 – William Hyde Wollaston (born 1766), English chemist.
