= 1815 in science =

The year 1815 in science and technology involved some significant events, listed below.

== Astronomy and space science ==
- October 3 – The Chassigny Martian meteorite falls in Chassigny, Haute-Marne, France.

== Biology ==
- Jean-Baptiste Lamarck begins publication of Histoire naturelle des animaux sans vertèbres.

== Chemistry ==
- William Prout anonymously publishes his hypothesis that the atomic weight of every element is an integer multiple of that of hydrogen.
- Dutch chemist Coenraad van Houten introduces alkaline salts to chocolate to reduce its bitterness.

== Earth sciences ==
- April 5 – Volcanic eruption of Mount Tambora on the Indonesian island of Sumbawa. About 92,000 people die as a direct consequence of this disaster, the largest volcanic eruption in recorded history. The eruption sends so much volcanic ash into the atmosphere that weather patterns around the world are altered, causing 1816 to be the "Year Without A Summer".
- August 1 – William Smith publishes the first national geological map of the United Kingdom, A Delineation of the Strata of England and Wales, with part of Scotland.

== Medicine ==
- July 10 – Apothecaries Act prohibits unlicensed medical practitioners in the United Kingdom.
- Cholesterol is discovered by French chemist Michel E. Chevreul, who analyzes it in human gall stones, but its causal relationship with atherosclerosis remains unknown.

== Physics ==
- Experiments by Jean Baptist Biot reveal polarimetry in the polarization of light in liquids.
- Atomic decay is discovered by Swedish chemist Jöns Jakob Berzelius in gadolinite, a radioactive mineral damaged by alpha particles released in its own activity.

== Technology ==
- November 3 – Sir Humphry Davy announces his discovery of the Davy lamp as a coal mining safety lamp.
- Dental floss is invented by Levi Spear Parmly.

== Awards ==
- Copley Medal: David Brewster

== Births ==
- January 18 – Warren De La Rue, Guernsey-born astronomical photographer (died 1889)
- January 21 – Horace Wells, American dentist, pioneer of the use of anesthesia (suicide 1848)
- July 26 – Robert Remak, Polish/Prussian embryologist (died 1865)
- August 23 – Henry Acland, English physician (died 1900)
- October 31 – Karl Weierstraß, German mathematician (died 1897)
- November 2 – George Boole, English-born mathematician (died 1864)
- December 10 – Augusta Ada King (née Byron), Countess of Lovelace, English computing pioneer (died 1852)
- Peter Bellinger Brodie, English geologist and clergyman (died 1897)

== Deaths ==
- February 9 – Ellen Hutchins, Irish botanist (born 1785)
- February 18 – William Roxburgh, Scottish surgeon and botanist, "father of Indian botany" (born 1751)
- February 22 – Smithson Tennant, English chemist (born 1761)
- February 24 – Robert Fulton, American engineer (born 1765)
- March 5 – Franz Mesmer, German physician (born 1734)
- September – Mary Edwards, English human computer (born c.1750)
- September 20 – Nicolas Desmarest, French naturalist (born 1725)
- November 30 - Philippe Petit-Radel, French surgeon (born 1749)
