= 1822 in science =

The year 1822 in science and technology involved some significant events, listed below.

== Biology ==
- "Rostocker Pfeilstorch", a white stork, is found in northern Germany with an arrow from central Africa through its neck, demonstrating the fact of bird migration.

== Geology ==
- Georges Cuvier establishes new standards and methods in stratigraphy and paleontology.
- Gideon Mantell discovers the first fossil of the iguanodon.
- John Phillips and William Conybeare identify the Carboniferous Period.
- Jean Baptiste Julien d'Omalius d'Halloy identifies the Cretaceous Period. He also proposes the Jurassic System.

== Mathematics ==
- July 3 – Charles Babbage publishes a proposal for a "difference engine", a mechanical forerunner of the modern computer for calculating logarithms and trigonometric functions. Construction of an operational version will proceed under British Government sponsorship 1823–32 but it will never be completed.
- Karl Feuerbach describes the nine-point circle of a triangle.
- William Farish of the University of Cambridge publishes a systematization of the rules for isometric drawing.

== Medicine ==
- United States Army surgeon William Beaumont pioneers human gastric endoscopy on Alexis St. Martin.
- Scottish surgeon John Henry Wishart gives the first description in England of neurofibromatosis type II.
- German poet and physician Justinus Kerner gives the first detailed description of botulism.

== Physics ==
- Navier–Stokes equations in fluid dynamics first formulated.

== Technology ==
- May 23 – HMS Comet launched at Deptford Dockyard in the United Kingdom, the first steamboat commissioned by the Royal Navy.
- June 10 – The Aaron Manby crosses the English Channel, making her the first seagoing iron steamboat.
- French civil engineer Louis Vicat completes construction of a concrete viaduct across the Dordogne at Souillac, Lot.

== Events ==
- September 11 – Galileo's Dialogue Concerning the Two Chief World Systems (1632) is permitted by the Roman Catholic Church to be published.

== Awards ==
- June 12 – Edward Banks knighted, the first such honour for work in civil engineering.
- Copley Medal: William Buckland

== Births ==
- January 2 – Rudolf Clausius, German physicist (died 1888)
- January 6 – Heinrich Schliemann, German archaeologist (died 1890)
- January 12 – Étienne Lenoir, Belgian mechanical engineer (died 1900)
- February 16 – Sir Francis Galton, English explorer, biologist (died 1911)
- April 18 – August Heinrich Petermann, German cartographer (died 1878)
- June 10 – Lydia White Shattuck, American botanist (died 1889)
- July 22 – Gregor Mendel, Silesian geneticist (died 1884)
- October 13 (O.S. October 1) – Lev Tsenkovsky, Polish-Ukrainian biologist (died 1887)
- December 27 – Louis Pasteur, French biologist (died 1895)

== Deaths ==
- January 21 – Marie-Aimée Lullin, Swiss entomologist (born 1751)
- February 23 – Johann Matthäus Bechstein, German naturalist (born 1757)
- June 23 – René Just Haüy, French mineralogist (born 1743)
- August 13 – Jean-Robert Argand, Swiss-born mathematician (born 1768)
- August 25 – William Herschel, German-born British astronomer (born 1738)
- November 6 – Claude Louis Berthollet, French chemist (born 1748)
