= 1827 in science =

The year 1827 in science and technology involved some significant events, listed below.

== Chemistry ==
- April 7 – John Walker begins selling his invention, the "Lucifer" friction match, in England.
- Aluminium isolated by Friedrich Wöhler.
- William Prout classifies the components of food into the three main divisions of carbohydrates, fats and proteins.
- Zeise's salt is the first platinum/olefin complex, an early example of organometallic chemistry.

== Exploration ==
- William Edward Parry reaches 82°45'N, which will remain for 49 years the highest latitude attained.

== Geology ==
- Gideon Mantell publishes his Illustrations of the Geology of Sussex, including the first use of the binomial Megalosaurus bucklandii.
- G. Poulett Scrope publishes his Memoir on the Geology of Central France, including the volcanic formations…, extending by detailed observation his work on volcanology.

== History of science ==
- John Farey publishes A Treatise on the Steam Engine, historical, practical and descriptive in London.

== Medicine ==
- March 11 – The predecessor of Qasr El Eyni Hospital and Cairo University School of Medicine is established in Egypt under the direction of Antoine Clot as the first medical school in the region.
- November 29 – Burke and Hare sell their first corpse for dissection by anatomist Robert Knox in Edinburgh (Scotland).
- Irish physician Robert Adams first describes the cardiac condition which will become known as Adams-Stokes syndrome.
- English physician Richard Bright first describes the renal condition which will become known as Bright's disease.

== Physics ==
- May 1 – Georg Ohm publishes Die galvanische Kette, mathematisch bearbeitet (tr., The Galvanic Circuit Investigated Mathematically) in which Ohm's law makes its first appearance.
- Scottish botanist Robert Brown observes the phenomenon of Brownian motion.
- Joseph Fourier first proposes existence of the greenhouse effect.

== Technology ==
- April 26–May 24 – The Royal Netherlands Navy's British-built paddle steamer Curaçao makes the first Transatlantic Crossing by steam, from Hellevoetsluis to Paramaribo.
- May 25 – Romanian inventor Petrache Poenaru is granted a French patent for a fountain pen.
- June 4 – French inventor Joseph Niépce sends a package to Louis Daguerre revealing the existence of his invention, "heliography", where an image can be reproduced onto a pewter plate and then reprinted.
- c. July – Robert Wilson of Dunbar in Scotland demonstrates a screw propeller.
- Scottish farmer's son Rev. Patrick Bell produces a model reaping machine.
- Completion of Ozimek Suspension Bridge in Poland, designed by Karl Schottelius, possibly the oldest surviving wrought iron suspension bridge in continental Europe.
- Jacob Perkins introduces the uniflow steam engine to the United Kingdom.

== Zoology ==
- John James Audubon begins publication of The Birds of America in the United Kingdom.
- Three giraffes, the first to be seen in Europe for over three centuries, are presented by the Ottoman Viceroy of Egypt, Mehmet Ali Pasha. Zarafa is presented to King Charles X of France in Paris on 9 July having walked from Marseille (landed 31 October 1826). The others are presented to King George IV of the United Kingdom in London and the Austrian Emperor Francis I in Vienna.

== Institutions ==
- Royal Institute of Technology (originally named 'Technological Institute') founded in Stockholm, Sweden.

== Awards ==
- Copley Medal: William Prout; Henry Foster

== Births ==
- January 13 (O.S. January 1) – Nikolay Beketov (died 1911), Russian chemist.
- January 7 – Sandford Fleming (died 1915), Scottish-born Canadian engineer and surveyor known as the "father of time zones".
- April 5 – Joseph Lister (died 1912), British inventor of antiseptic.
- May 31 – Kusumoto Ine (born Shiimoto Ine, died 1903), pioneering Japanese woman physician.
- August 27 – Henry Edwards (died 1891), English-born entomologist and actor.
- November 30 – George Jackson Mivart (died 1900), English biologist.
- December 29 – Bernhard Sigmund Schultze (died 1919), German obstetrician.
- Henry Gray (died 1861), English anatomist.

== Deaths ==
- March 5
  - Pierre-Simon Laplace (born 1749), French mathematician.
  - Alessandro Volta (born 1745), Italian physicist.
- April 3 – Ernst Chladni (born 1756), German physicist.
- April 12 – Michele Troja (born 1747), Italian physician
- July 14 – Augustin-Jean Fresnel (born 1788), French physicist.
