= 1739 in science =

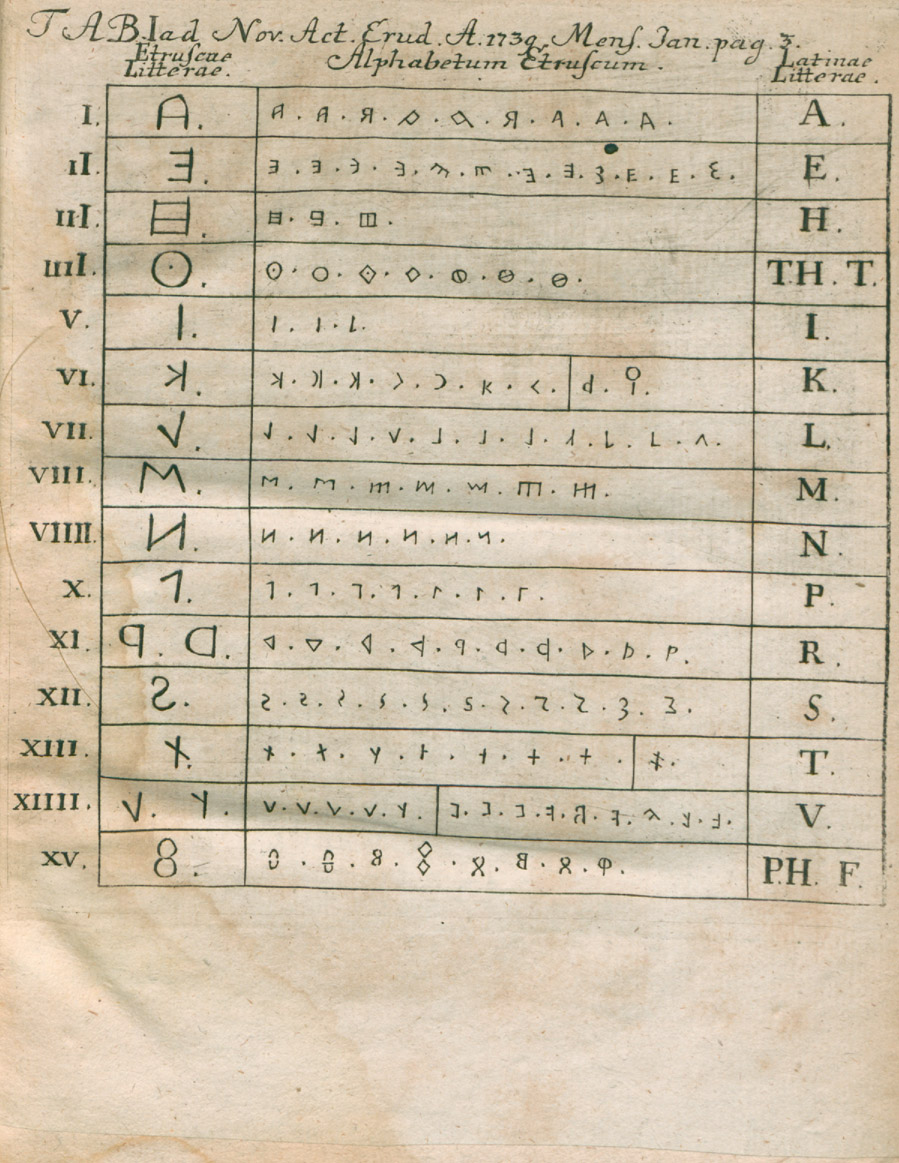

The year 1739 in science and technology involved some significant events.

== Earth sciences ==
- Plinian eruption of Mount Tarumae volcano in Japan.

== Exploration ==
- January 1 – Bouvet Island is discovered by French explorer Jean-Baptiste Charles Bouvet de Lozier in the South Atlantic Ocean.

== Mathematics ==
- Leonhard Euler solves the general homogeneous linear ordinary differential equation with constant coefficients.
- Euler invents the tonnetz (German for "tone-network"), a conceptual lattice diagram that shows a two-dimensional tonal pitch space created by the network of relationships between musical pitches in just intonation.

== Physics ==
- Émilie du Châtelet publishes Dissertation sur la nature et la propagation du feu.

== Awards ==
- Copley Medal: Stephen Hales

== Societies ==
- June 2 – The Royal Swedish Academy of Sciences is founded in Stockholm by Linnaeus, Mårten Triewald and others.

== Births ==
- November 14 – William Hewson, English surgeon, anatomist and physiologist, "father of haematology" (died 1774)
- December 14 – Pierre Samuel du Pont de Nemours, French industrialist (died 1817)
- Israel Lyons, English mathematician and botanist (died 1775)

== Deaths ==
- April 19 – Nicholas Saunderson, English scientist and mathematician (born 1682)
- April 27 – Nicolas Sarrabat, French scientist, astronomer and mathematician (born 1698)
