= 1829 in science =

The year 1829 in science and technology involved some significant events, listed below.

== Chemistry ==
- Isaac Holden produces a form of friction match.

== Mathematics ==
- Peter Gustav Lejeune Dirichlet publishes a memoir giving the Dirichlet conditions, showing for which functions the convergence of the Fourier series holds; introducing Dirichlet's test for the convergence of series; the Dirichlet function as an example that not any function is integrable; and, in the proof of the theorem for the Fourier series, the Dirichlet kernel and Dirichlet integral. He also introduces a general modern concept for a function.
- Nikolai Ivanovich Lobachevsky publishes his work on hyperbolic non-Euclidean geometry.
- S. D. Poisson publishes Sur l'attraction des sphéroides.

== Medicine ==
- Dr Benjamin Guy Babington makes the first known use of a laryngoscope.

== Palaeontology ==
- Jules Desnoyers names the Quaternary period.
- Engis 2, part of the skull of a young child and other bones, recognised in 1936 as the first known Neanderthal fossil, is found in the Awirs cave near Engis in the United Kingdom of the Netherlands (modern-day Belgium) by Philippe-Charles Schmerling.

== Technology ==
- May – Cyrill Demian patents a version of the accordion in Vienna.
- June 30 – Henry Robinson Palmer files a British patent application for corrugated iron for use in buildings.
- July 23 – In the United States, William Burt obtains the first patent for a form of typewriter, the typographer.
- October 6–14 – The Rainhill Trials, a steam locomotive competition, are run in England and won by Stephenson's Rocket.
- December 19 – Charles Wheatstone patents the concertina in Britain.
- William Mann invents the compound air compressor.
- Louis Braille publishes the first description of his method of embossed printing that allows the visually impaired to read.

== Higher Education ==
- Chalmers University of Technology founded in Gothenburg, Sweden.
- Technical University of Denmark (originally named 'College of Advanced Technology') founded in Copenhagen, Denmark.
- University of Stuttgart founded in Stuttgart, Germany.
- Ecole Centrale Paris (originally named 'École Centrale des Arts et Manufactures') founded in Paris, France.

== Awards ==
- Copley Medal: not awarded

== Births ==
- February 2
  - Alfred Brehm (died 1884), German zoologist.
  - William Stanley (died 1909), English inventor.
- March 23 – N. R. Pogson (died 1891 in science), English-born astronomer.
- April 28 – Charles Bourseul (died 1912), Belgian-born telegraph engineer.
- April 30 – Ferdinand von Hochstetter (died 1884), German-born geologist.
- June 4 – Allan Octavian Hume (died 1912), British political reformer, "father of Indian ornithology" and botanist.
- July 30 – George Rolleston (died 1881), English physician and zoologist.
- August 13 (O.S. August 1) – Ivan Sechenov (died 1905), "father of Russian physiology".
- August 23 – Moritz Cantor (died 1920), German historian of mathematics.
- August 24 - Emanuella Carlbeck (died 1901), Swedish pioneer in the education of students with intellectual disability.
- September 7 – August Kekulé (died 1896), German chemist.
- September 30
  - Franz Reuleaux (died 1905), German mechanical engineer, "father of kinematics".
  - Joseph Wolstenholme (died 1891), English mathematician.
- October 15 – Asaph Hall (died 1907), American astronomer.
- November 4 – Hanna Hammarström (died 1909), Swedish inventor.

== Deaths ==
- March 1 – Thomas Earnshaw (born 1749), English watchmaker.
- April 6 – Niels Henrik Abel (born 1802), Norwegian mathematician.
- May 10 – Thomas Young (born 1773), English physicist.
- May 29 – Humphry Davy (born 1778), English chemist.
- June 29 – James Smithson (born 1764), English mineralogist, chemist and benefactor.
- November 14 – Louis Nicolas Vauquelin (born 1763), French chemist.
- October 10 – Maria Elizabetha Jacson (born 1755), English botanist.
- December 28 – Jean-Baptiste Lamarck (born 1744), French naturalist.
- undated – Huang Lü, Chinese scientist.
