= 1861 in paleontology =

List of years in paleontology	(table)
- … 1851; 1852; 1853; 1854; 1855; 1856; 1857; 1858; 1859; 1860; 1861; 1862; 1863; 1864; 1865; 1866; 1867; 1868; 1869; 1870; 1871 …
- In science 1858 1859 1860 1861 1862 1863 1864
- Art; Archaeology; Architecture; Literature; Music; Philosophy; Science; +...

Paleontology or palaeontology is the study of prehistoric life forms on Earth through the examination of plant and animal fossils. This includes the study of body fossils, tracks (ichnites), burrows, cast-off parts, fossilised feces (coprolites), palynomorphs and chemical residues. Because humans have encountered fossils for millennia, paleontology has a long history both before and after becoming formalized as a science. This article records significant discoveries and events related to paleontology that occurred or were published in the year 1861.

== Crustaceans ==
=== New taxa ===
Taxon	Novelty	Status	Author(s)	Age	Unit	Location	Notes	Images
Etallonia	Gen. et. comb. nov.	Valid	Oppel	Jurassic	Solnhofen Limestone	Germany	An axiid, type species is E. longimana, initially described as Magila longimana in 1839.	
Pseudastacus	Gen. et. comb. nov.	Valid	Oppel	Jurassic	Solnhofen Limestone	Germany	A stenochirid, type species is P. pustulosus, initially described as Bolina pustulosa in 1839.	

== Dinosaurs ==
=== New taxa ===
Taxon	Novelty	Status	Author(s)	Age	Unit	Location	Notes	Images
Archaeopteryx lithographica	Gen. et sp. nov.	Valid	Meyer	Kimmeridgian	Solnhofen Limestone	Germany	Early bird, only known from a single flight feather.	
Echinodon becklesii	Gen. et sp. nov.	Valid	Owen	Berriasian	Purbeck Beds	UK	Known from multiple jaw and tooth fossils, originally interpreted as a lacertilian.	
Teratosaurus suevicus	Gen. et sp. nov.	Valid	von Meyer	Norian	Löwenstein Formation	Germany	Originally interpreted as an early dinosaur, now an early pseudosuchian.	

== Pterosaurs ==
=== New taxa ===
Taxon	Novelty	Status	Author(s)	Age	Unit	Location	Notes	Images
Scaphognathus	Gen. nov.	Valid	Wagner	Kimmeridgian	Solnhofen limestone	Germany	A new genus for Pterodactylus crassirostris Goldfuss, 1831	
