= 1859 in paleontology =

List of years in paleontology	(table)
- … 1849; 1850; 1851; 1852; 1853; 1854; 1855; 1856; 1857; 1858; 1859; 1860; 1861; 1862; 1863; 1864; 1865; 1866; 1867; 1868; 1869 …
- In science 1856 1857 1858 1859 1860 1861 1862
- Art; Archaeology; Architecture; Literature; Music; Philosophy; Science; +...

Paleontology or palaeontology is the study of prehistoric life forms on Earth through the examination of plant and animal fossils. This includes the study of body fossils, tracks (ichnites), burrows, cast-off parts, fossilised feces (coprolites), palynomorphs and chemical residues. Because humans have encountered fossils for millennia, paleontology has a long history both before and after becoming formalized as a science. This article records significant discoveries and events related to paleontology that occurred or were published in the year 1859.

== Plants ==
=== Angiosperms ===
Name	Novelty	Status	Authors	Age	Unit	Location	Synonymized taxa	Notes	Images
Anchietea borealis	Sp nov	jr synonym	Heer	Paleocene late Paleocene	Menat Formation	France; Puy-de-Dôme		First described as a violaceous species. Moved to Atriplex borealis inn 1912. Moved to Palaeocarpinus borealis in 2021.	

== Dinosaurs ==
=== New taxa ===
Taxon	Novelty	Status	Author(s)	Age	Unit	Location	Notes	Images
Compsognathus longipes	Gen. et. sp. nov.	Valid	Wagner	Tithonian	Solnhofen Limestone	Germany	A compsognathid.	
Hadrosaurus foulkii	Gen. et sp. nov.	Valid	Leidy	Campanian	Woodbury Formation	New Jersey	A hadrosaurid.	
"Scelidosaurus"	Invalid	Nomen nudum	Owen	Sinemurian	Blue Lias	UK	A basal thyreophoran.	

== Pterosaurs ==
- Buckman described a clutch of 4.5 cm long oval-shaped fossil eggs from Middle Jurassic marine rock in the United Kingdom. He erected the new oogenus and oospecies Oolithes bathonicae for them, the first time fossil eggs had been given their own unique taxonomic name.

=== New taxa ===
Taxon	Novelty	Status	Author(s)	Age	Unit	Location	Notes	Images
Dimorphodon	Gen. nov.	Valid	Owen	Sinemurian	Blue Lias	UK	A new generic name for Pterodactylus macronyx.	

== Synapsids ==
=== Non-mammalian ===
Taxon	Novelty	Status	Author(s)	Age	Unit	Location	Notes	Images
Galesaurus				252 Millions of years ago		South Africa		
