= 1857 in paleontology =

| List of years in paleontology | (table) |
- … 1847; 1848; 1849; 1850; 1851; 1852; 1853; 1854; 1855; 1856; 1857; 1858; 1859; 1860; 1861; 1862; 1863; 1864; 1865; 1866; 1867 …
- In science 1854 1855 1856 1857 1858 1859 1860
- Art; Archaeology; Architecture; Literature; Music; Philosophy; Science; +...

Paleontology or palaeontology is the study of prehistoric life forms on Earth through the examination of plant and animal fossils. This includes the study of body fossils, tracks (ichnites), burrows, cast-off parts, fossilised feces (coprolites), palynomorphs and chemical residues. Because humans have encountered fossils for millennia, paleontology has a long history both before and after becoming formalized as a science. This article records significant discoveries and events related to paleontology that occurred or were published in the year 1857.

== Dinosaurs ==
=== New taxa ===
| Taxon | Novelty | Status | Author(s) | Age | Unit | Location | Notes | Images |
|---|---|---|---|---|---|---|---|---|
| Gresslyosaurus ingens | Gen et sp. nov. | Disputed | Rütimeyer | Rhaetian | Knollenmergel | Switzerland | Possible subjective synonym of Plateosaurus | |
| Stenopelix valdensis | Gen. et sp. nov. | Valid | von Meyer | Berriasian | Obernkirchen Sandstein Formation | Germany | A Marginocephalian. | |

== Pterosaurs ==
- Hermann von Meyer names the species Pterodactylus crassipes, and also provides the alternative classification of the taxon as Rhamphorhynchus crassipes.

=== New taxa ===
| Taxon | Novelty | Status | Author(s) | Age | Unit | Location | Notes | Images |
|---|---|---|---|---|---|---|---|---|
| Pterodactylus crassipes | Sp. nov. | Valid | von Meyer | Kimmeridgian | Solnhofen limestone | Germany | Later identified as a theropod related to Archaeopteryx and named Ostromia crassipes. | |

== Ichthyosaurs ==
- Holotype specimen of Temnodontosaurus crassimanus (Ichthyosauria) from the Early Jurassic at Kettleness, Yorkshire, England.

== Paleontologists ==
- Birth of William Diller Matthew.
