= 1860 in paleontology =

List of years in paleontology	(table)
- … 1850; 1851; 1852; 1853; 1854; 1855; 1856; 1857; 1858; 1859; 1860; 1861; 1862; 1863; 1864; 1865; 1866; 1867; 1868; 1869; 1870 …
- In science 1857 1858 1859 1860 1861 1862 1863
- Art; Archaeology; Architecture; Literature; Music; Philosophy; Science; +...

Paleontology or palaeontology is the study of prehistoric life forms on Earth through the examination of plant and animal fossils. This includes the study of body fossils, tracks (ichnites), burrows, cast-off parts, fossilised feces (coprolites), palynomorphs and chemical residues. Because humans have encountered fossils for millennia, paleontology has a long history both before and after becoming formalized as a science. This article records significant discoveries and events related to paleontology that occurred or were published in the year 1860.

== Insects ==
=== New taxa ===
Name	Novelty	Status	Authors	Age	Unit	Location	Notes	Images
Limnobiorhynchus brevipalpa	comb. nov	jr synonym	(Loew) Osten-Sacken	Middle Eocene	Baltic amber	Europe	A Limoniid cranefly, syn of Elephantomyia brevipalpa	Elephantomyia brevipalpa
Limnobiorhynchus pulchella	comb. nov	jr synonym	(Loew) Osten-Sacken	Middle Eocene	Baltic amber	Europe	A Limoniid cranefly, syn of Elephantomyia pulchella	Elephantomyia pulchella

== Pterosaurs ==
=== New taxa ===
Taxon	Novelty	Status	Author(s)	Age	Unit	Location	Notes	Images
Dorygnathus	Gen. nov.	Valid	Wagner	Toarcian	Posidonia Shale	Germany	A new genus name for Pterodactylus banthensis Theodori, 1831.	

== Plesiosaurs ==
=== New taxa ===
Taxon	Novelty	Status	Author(s)	Age	Unit	Location	Notes	Images
Goniosaurus		Valid	Meyer					

== Synapsids ==
=== New taxa ===
Taxon	Novelty	Status	Author(s)	Age	Unit	Location	Notes	Images
Deuterosaurus		Valid	Eichwald	267 Millions of years ago		Russia	The scientists believed that they had found a Dinosaur, but in Reality it was a ProtoMammal.	
Eurosaurus		Valid	Eichwald					
Oudenodon		Valid	Owen	254 Millions of years ago.		India; Madagascar; Malawi; South Africa; Zambia		
