= 1856 in paleontology =

| List of years in paleontology | (table) |
- … 1846; 1847; 1848; 1849; 1850; 1851; 1852; 1853; 1854; 1855; 1856; 1857; 1858; 1859; 1860; 1861; 1862; 1863; 1864; 1865; 1866 …
- In science 1853 1854 1855 1856 1857 1858 1859
- Art; Archaeology; Architecture; Literature; Music; Philosophy; Science; +...

Paleontology or palaeontology is the study of prehistoric life forms on Earth through the examination of plant and animal fossils. This includes the study of body fossils, tracks (ichnites), burrows, cast-off parts, fossilised feces (coprolites), palynomorphs and chemical residues. Because humans have encountered fossils for millennia, paleontology has a long history both before and after becoming formalized as a science. This article records significant discoveries and events related to paleontology that occurred or were published in the year 1856.

== Insects ==
=== New taxa ===
| Name | Novelty | Status | Authors | Age | Unit | Location | Notes | Images |
|---|---|---|---|---|---|---|---|---|
| Osmylus picta | Sp. nov | Synonym | Hagen | Priabonian | Baltic amber | Europe | A protosmyline Osmylid lance lacewing Moved to "Protosmylus" picta (1913) moved to Osmylidia picta (2021) | |

== Conodonts ==
=== New taxa ===
| Taxon | Novelty | Status | Author(s) | Age | Unit | Location | Notes | Images |
|---|---|---|---|---|---|---|---|---|
| Acodus | | Valid | Pander | | | | | |
| Gnathodus | | valid | Pander | Early Carboniferous | | | | |
| Prioniodus | | valid | Pander | | | | | |

== Archosauromorphs ==
=== Dinosaurs ===
==== New taxa ====
| Taxon | Novelty | Status | Author(s) | Age | Unit | Location | Notes | Images |
|---|---|---|---|---|---|---|---|---|
| Deinodon horridus | Gen. et sp. nov. | Nomen dubium | Leidy | Campanian | Judith River Formation | Montana | Might be a subjective synonym of Gorgosaurus or Daspletosaurus. | |
| "Dinosaurus gresslyi" | Invalid | Nomen nudum | Rütimeyer | Rhaetian | Knollenmergel | Switzerland | Preoccupied by a therapsid but invalid as published in an abstract. Later named Gresslyosaurus | |
| Palaeoscincus costatus | Gen. et sp. nov. | Nomen dubium | Leidy | Campanian | Judith River Formation | Montana | Possible subjective synonym of Edmontonia or Panoplosaurus. | |
| Thespesius occidentalis | Gen. et sp. nov. | Nomen dubium | Leidy | Maastrichtian | Lance Formation | Montana | A dubious hadrosaurid. | |
| Trachodon mirabilis | Gen. et sp. nov. | Nomen dubium | Leidy | Campanian | Judith River Formation | Montana | A dubious hadrosaurid. | |
| Troodon formosus | Gen. et sp. nov. | Disputed | Leidy | Campanian | Judith River Formation | Montana | A potentially dubious troodontid. | |

=== Pterosaurs ===
- Albert Oppel reported the discovery of a pterosaur lower jaw from the Posidonia shales of Holzmaden. This was the first pterosaur specimen to be reported from these deposits, which would go on to produce many pterosaur fossils of exceptional quality.

=== Phytosaurs ===
==== New taxa ====
| Taxon | Novelty | Status | Author(s) | Age | Unit | Location | Notes | Images |
|---|---|---|---|---|---|---|---|---|
| Centemodon | | Nomen dubium | Lea | | | | | |

=== Crocodylomorphs ===
==== New taxa ====
| Taxon | Novelty | Status | Author(s) | Age | Unit | Location | Notes | Images |
|---|---|---|---|---|---|---|---|---|
| Dakosaurus | | Valid | Quenstedt | | | Germany | A metriorhynchid thalattosuchian belong to Geosaurinae. | |
