= 1862 in paleontology =

List of years in paleontology	(table)
- … 1852; 1853; 1854; 1855; 1856; 1857; 1858; 1859; 1860; 1861; 1862; 1863; 1864; 1865; 1866; 1867; 1868; 1869; 1870; 1871; 1872 …
- In science 1859 1860 1861 1862 1863 1864 1865
- Art; Archaeology; Architecture; Literature; Music; Philosophy; Science; +...

Paleontology or palaeontology is the study of prehistoric life forms on Earth through the examination of plant and animal fossils. This includes the study of body fossils, tracks (ichnites), burrows, cast-off parts, fossilised feces (coprolites), palynomorphs and chemical residues. Because humans have encountered fossils for millennia, paleontology has a long history both before and after becoming formalized as a science. This article records significant discoveries and events related to paleontology that occurred or were published in the year 1862.

== Dinosaurs ==
Name	Novelty	Status	Authors	Age	Unit	Location	Notes	Images
Dimodosaurus		Nomen dubium	Pidancet; Chopard				Possible subjective synonym of Plateosaurus.	
Griphornis	Gen. nov.	Nomen rejectum	Sir Richard Owen vide Woodward	Kimmeridgian	Solnhofen Limestone	Germany	Rejected in favor of Archaeopteryx.	
Griphosaurus	Gen. nov.	Nomen rejectum	Andreas Wagner	Kimmeridgian	Solnhofen Limestone	Germany	Named for a skeleton with feathers considered by Wagner to represent a reptile unrelated to the origin of birds, specifically opposing Darwinian evolution and Hermann von Meyer's taxon Archaeopteryx.	

== Paleontologists ==
- Birth of Eberhard Fraas.
