= 1855 in paleontology =

List of years in paleontology	(table)
- … 1845; 1846; 1847; 1848; 1849; 1850; 1851; 1852; 1853; 1854; 1855; 1856; 1857; 1858; 1859; 1860; 1861; 1862; 1863; 1864; 1865 …
- In science 1852 1853 1854 1855 1856 1857 1858
- Art; Archaeology; Architecture; Literature; Music; Philosophy; Science; +...

Paleontology or palaeontology is the study of prehistoric life forms on Earth through the examination of plant and animal fossils. This includes the study of body fossils, tracks (ichnites), burrows, cast-off parts, fossilised feces (coprolites), palynomorphs and chemical residues. Because humans have encountered fossils for millennia, paleontology has a long history both before and after becoming formalized as a science. This article records significant discoveries and events related to paleontology that occurred or were published in the year 1855.

== Pterosaurs ==
=== New taxa ===
Taxon	Novelty	Status	Author(s)	Age	Unit	Location	Notes	Images
Pterodactylus suevicus	Sp. nov.	Valid	Quenstedt	Kimmeridgian	Nusplinger Schist	Germany	Later named Cycnorhamphus suevicus	

== Plesiosaurs ==
=== New taxa ===
Taxon	Novelty	Status	Author(s)	Age	Unit	Location	Notes	Images
Aptychodon	Gen. nov.	Valid	Reuss	Turonian	Jizeru Formation	Czech Republic	A pliosauroid.	
Brimosaurus	Gen. nov.	Valid	Leidy	Late Cretaceous	Unknown	US	A dubious plesiosauroid.	

== Museums ==
- The Albany Museum of Grahamstown, South Africa is established.
