= 1863 in paleontology =

| List of years in paleontology | (table) |
- … 1853; 1854; 1855; 1856; 1857; 1858; 1859; 1860; 1861; 1862; 1863; 1864; 1865; 1866; 1867; 1868; 1869; 1870; 1871; 1872; 1873 …
- In science 1860 1861 1862 1863 1864 1865 1866
- Art; Archaeology; Architecture; Literature; Music; Philosophy; Science; +...

Paleontology or palaeontology is the study of prehistoric life forms on Earth through the examination of plant and animal fossils. This includes the study of body fossils, tracks (ichnites), burrows, cast-off parts, fossilised feces (coprolites), palynomorphs and chemical residues. Because humans have encountered fossils for millennia, paleontology has a long history both before and after becoming formalized as a science. This article records significant discoveries and events related to paleontology that occurred or were published in the year 1863.

== Pterosaurs ==
- The book "La Terre avant Le Deluge" by Louis Figuier was published. It included an early restoration of a Rhamphorhynchus walking across the ground on all fours. This depiction was based on fossil footprints from the Solnhofen limestone attributed to the taxon.
