= 1852 in paleontology =

List of years in paleontology	(table)
- … 1842; 1843; 1844; 1845; 1846; 1847; 1848; 1849; 1850; 1851; 1852; 1853; 1854; 1855; 1856; 1857; 1858; 1859; 1860; 1861; 1862 …
- In science 1849 1850 1851 1852 1853 1854 1855
- Art; Archaeology; Architecture; Literature; Music; Philosophy; Science; +...

Paleontology or palaeontology is the study of prehistoric life forms on Earth through the examination of plant and animal fossils. This includes the study of body fossils, tracks (ichnites), burrows, cast-off parts, fossilised feces (coprolites), palynomorphs and chemical residues. Because humans have encountered fossils for millennia, paleontology has a long history both before and after becoming formalized as a science. This article records significant discoveries and events related to paleontology that occurred or were published in the year 1852.

== Reptiles ==
=== Non-dinosaurs ===
Name	Authors	Age	Location	Images
Tanystropheus	von Meyer	237 Millions of years ago	China; France; Germany; Israel; Switzerland; UK	
Brachytrachelus	Preoccupied.	Geibel		preoccupied name; now known as Scaphognathus
Ctenochasma	Valid	von Meyer		Pterosaur
Macrotrachelus	Jr. synonym.	Giebel		Jr. synonym of Pterodactylus.

=== Dinosaurs ===
Name	Status	Authors	Age	Unit	Location	Notes	Images
Aepisaurus	Nomen dubium	Gervais	Early Cretaceous (Albian)	Grès vert	France	A possible camarasaurid.	
Oplosaurus	Nomen dubium	Gervais	Early Cretaceous (Barremian)	Wessex Formation	England	A sauropod of unknown affinities.	

== Death ==
- Gideon Algernon Mantell died.

== Literature ==
- Bleak House by Charles Dickens was published. The story told by this novel is unrelated to paleontology, but it does briefly mention a Megalosaurus, which happened to be the first reference made to dinosaurs in fiction.
