= 1865 in paleontology =

List of years in paleontology	(table)
- … 1855; 1856; 1857; 1858; 1859; 1860; 1861; 1862; 1863; 1864; 1865; 1866; 1867; 1868; 1869; 1870; 1871; 1872; 1873; 1874; 1875 …
- In science 1862 1863 1864 1865 1866 1867 1868
- Art; Archaeology; Architecture; Literature; Music; Philosophy; Science; +...

Paleontology or palaeontology is the study of prehistoric life forms on Earth through the examination of plant and animal fossils. This includes the study of body fossils, tracks (ichnites), burrows, cast-off parts, fossilised feces (coprolites), palynomorphs and chemical residues. Because humans have encountered fossils for millennia, paleontology has a long history both before and after becoming formalized as a science. This article records significant discoveries and events related to paleontology that occurred or were published in the year 1865.

== Newly named archosauromorphs ==
=== Newly named basal archosauromorphs ===
Name	Status	Authors	Age	Unit	Location	Notes
Ankistrodon	Nomen dubium	Thomas Henry Huxley	Early Triassic	Panchet Formation	India	A proterosuchid.

=== Newly named dinosaurs ===
Name	Novelty	Status	Authors	Age	Unit	Location	Notes	Images
Astrodon johnstoni	Gen. et sp. nov.	Valid	Leidy	Early Cretaceous (Aptian/Albian boundary)	Arundel Formation	Maryland	An indeterminate titanosauriform.	
Coelosaurus		Preoccupied.	Joseph Leidy	Late Cretaceous (early Maastrichtian)	Navesink Formation	New Jersey	An ornithomimid. Preoccupied by Owen 1854.	
Megadactylus		Preoccupied	Hitchcock	Early Jurassic	Portland Formation	US	Preoccupied by Fitzinger, 1843. Later renamed Amphisaurus.	
Polacanthus		Valid	Sir Richard Owen vide Anonymous.	Early Cretaceous (Barremian)	Wessex Formation	UK	A polacanthine ankylosaur.	
Tomodon		Preoccupied.	Joseph Leidy	Maastrichtian	Navesink Formation	US	Preoccupied by Duméril 1853 Later renamed Diplotomodon.	

== Plesiosaurs ==
=== Newly named plesiosaurs ===
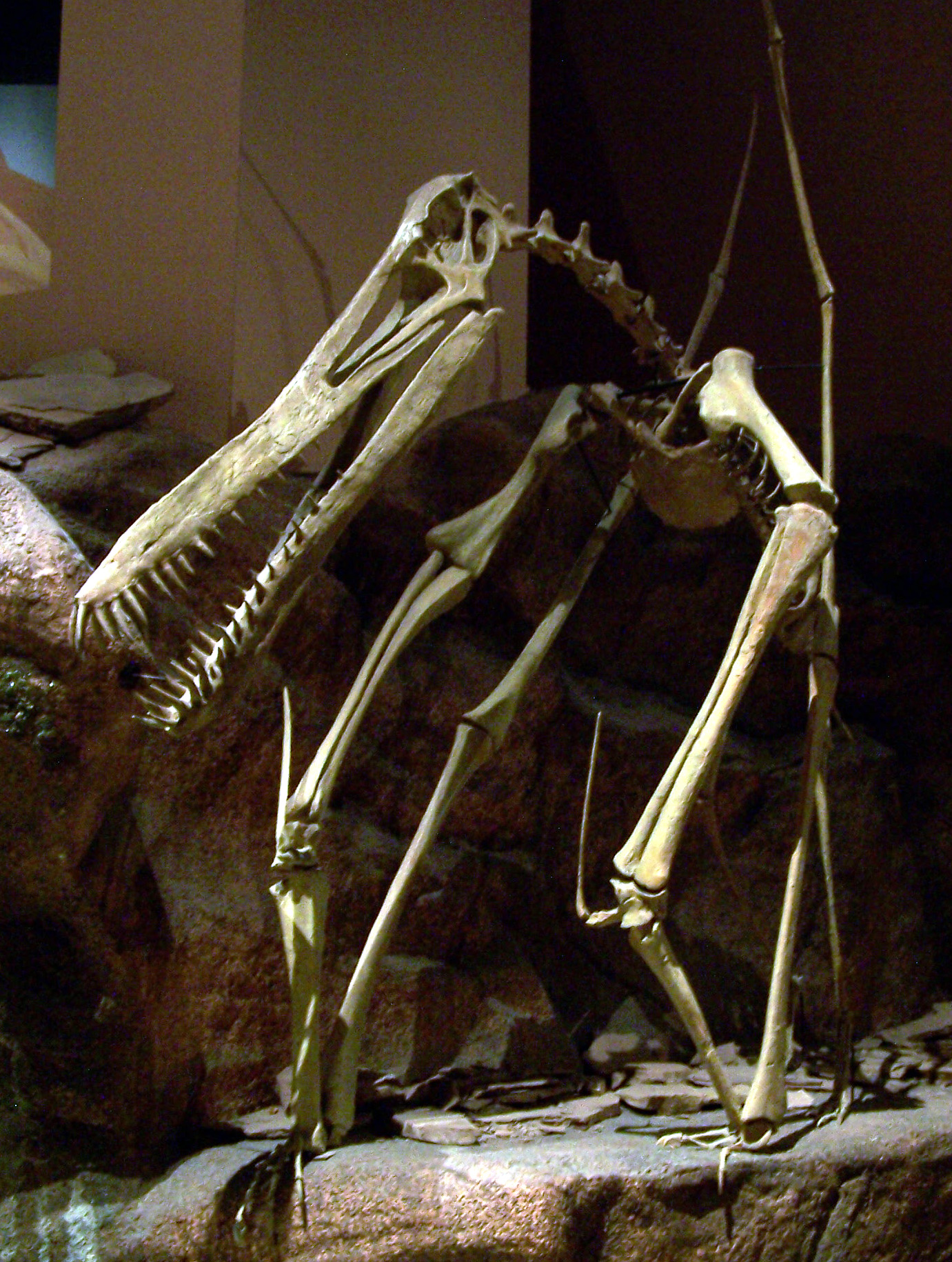
Anhanguera.

Name	Status	Authors	Age	Unit	Location	Notes
Piratosaurus	Nomen dubium	Leidy	Late Cretaceous (Santonian)			A dubious plesiosaur.
Plesiosaurus homalospondylus	Valid	Sir Richard Owen	Early Jurassic (Toarcian)	Alum shale	UK	A Microcleididae plesiosaur. Type species of Microcleidus Watson, 1909.
Plesiosaurus rostratus	Valid	Sir Richard Owen	Early Jurassic (Hettangian-Sinemurian)	Charmouth Mudstone	UK	A rhomaleosaurid plesiosaur. Type species of Archaeonectrus Novozhilov, 1964.
