= 1870 in paleontology =

List of years in paleontology	(table)
- … 1860; 1861; 1862; 1863; 1864; 1865; 1866; 1867; 1868; 1869; 1870; 1871; 1872; 1873; 1874; 1875; 1876; 1877; 1878; 1879; 1880 …
- In science 1867 1868 1869 1870 1871 1872 1873
- Art; Archaeology; Architecture; Literature; Music; Philosophy; Science; +...

Paleontology or palaeontology is the study of prehistoric life forms on Earth through the examination of plant and animal fossils. This includes the study of body fossils, tracks (ichnites), burrows, cast-off parts, fossilised feces (coprolites), palynomorphs and chemical residues. Because humans have encountered fossils for millennia, paleontology has a long history both before and after becoming formalized as a science. This article records significant discoveries and events related to paleontology that occurred or were published in the year 1870.

== Arthropods ==
=== Newly named insects ===
Name	Novelty	Status	Authors	Age	Unit	Location	Notes	Images
Bibio lartetii	Sp. nov	jr synonym	Oustalet, 1870	Oligocene		France	A bibionid, moved to Plecia larteti in 2017	Plecia larteti
Protomyia lugens	Sp nov	jr synonym	Oustalet, 1870	Oligocene		France	A bibionid, moved to Penthetria lugens in 2017	Penthetria lugens

== "Fish" ==
Name	Novelty	Status	Authors	Age	Unit	Location	Notes	Images
Asineops'	Gen et Sp nov	valid	Cope	Eocene; Ypresian	Green River Formation	US; Wyoming	A fish of possibly Percopsiformes affiliation. The type species is A. squamifrons	Asineops squamifrons
Cyprinodon levatus	Sp nov	Jr synonym	Cope	Eocene; Ypresian	Green River Formation	US; Wyoming	A percopsid fish Moved to Erismatopterus levatus in 1871	Erismatopterus levatus

== Turtles ==
Name	Novelty	Status	Authors	Age	Unit	Location	Notes	Images
Pneumatoarthrus	Gen et sp nov	valid	Cope	Cretaceous; Maastrichtian	Mount Laurel Formation	US; New Jersey	First identified as a possible basal sauropod. Reidentified as a protostegid marine turtle. The type species is P. peloreus	Pneumatoarthrus

== Archosauromorphs ==
=== Newly named birds ===
Name	Status	Authors		Location	Notes
Laornis	Misidentification.	Marsh	USA; New Jersey	Misidentified bird. The type species is L. edvardsianus	

=== Dinosaurs ===
Taxon	Novelty	Status	Author(s)	Age	Unit	Location	Notes	Images
Antrodemus	Gen. nov.	Nomen dubium	Leidy	Tithonian	Morrison Formation	Colorado	Possible subjective synonym of Allosaurus	
Hadrosaurus minor	Sp. nov.	Nomen dubium	Marsh	Maastrichtian	Navesink Formation?	New Jersey	A species of Hadrosaurus	
Ornithopsis hulkei	Gen. et sp. nov.	Nomen dubium	Seeley	Barremian	Wealden Formation	England	Earlier it was believed that the fossils were those of a pterosaur. But now it is known that they were the bones of a Sauropod.	
"Struthiosaurus"		Nomen nudum	Bunzel	Campanian	Grünbach Formation	Austria	An ankylosaur formally named Struthiosaurus in 1871	

== Plesiosaurs ==
=== New taxa ===
Name	Status	Authors	Location	Notes
Taphrosaurus	Valid	Cope	USA (New Jersey)	
Uronautes	Valid	Cope		

== Pterosaurs ==
- Harry Govier Seeley published his expansive book The Ornithosauria, reviewing the anatomy and classification of pterosaurs.

=== New taxa ===
Taxon	Novelty	Status	Author(s)	Age	Unit	Location	Notes	Images
Cycnorhamphus	Gen. nov.	Valid	Seeley	Kimmeridgian	Nursplinger Schist	Germany	A new genus for Pterodactylus suevicus Quenstedt, 1855	
Ornithocheirus brachyrhinus	Sp. nov.	Nomen dubium	Seeley	Albian	Cambridge Greensand	England	A new species of Ornithocheirus.	
Ornithocheirus capito	Sp. nov.	Nomen dubium	Seeley	Albian	Cambridge Greensand	England	A new species of Ornithocheirus.	
Ornithocheirus colorhinus	Sp. nov.	Valid	Seeley	Albian	Cambridge Greensand	England	A new species of Ornithocheirus. Later named Camposipterus colorhinus	
Ornithocheirus crassidens	Sp. nov.	Nomen dubium	Seeley	Albian	Cambridge Greensand	England	A new species of Ornithocheirus.	
Ornithocheirus dentatus	Sp. nov.	Nomen dubium	Seeley	Albian	Cambridge Greensand	England	A new species of Ornithocheirus.	
Ornithocheirus denticulatus	Sp. nov.	Nomen dubium	Seeley	Albian	Cambridge Greensand	England	A new species of Ornithocheirus.	
Ornithocheirus enchorhynchus	Sp. nov.	Nomen dubium	Seeley	Albian	Cambridge Greensand	England	A new species of Ornithocheirus.	
Ornithocheirus eurygnathus	Sp. nov.	Nomen dubium	Seeley	Albian	Cambridge Greensand	England	A new species of Ornithocheirus.	
Ornithocheirus huxleyi	Sp. nov.	Nomen dubium	Seeley	Albian	Cambridge Greensand	England	A new species of Ornithocheirus.	
Ornithocheirus machaerorhynchus	Sp. nov.	Valid	Seeley	Albian	Cambridge Greensand	England	A new species of Ornithocheirus. Later named Lonchodraco machaerorhynchus.	
Ornithocheirus microdon	Sp. nov.	Valid	Seeley	Albian	Cambridge Greensand	England	A new species of Ornithocheirus. Later named Lonchodraco microdon.	
Ornithocheirus nasutus	Sp. nov.	Valid	Seeley	Albian	Cambridge Greensand	England	A new species of Ornithocheirus. Later named Camposipterus nasutus.	
Ornithocheirus oxyrhinus	Sp. nov.	Nomen dubium	Seeley	Albian	Cambridge Greensand	England	A new species of Ornithocheirus.	
Ornithocheirus platystomus	Sp. nov.	Nomen dubium	Seeley	Albian	Cambridge Greensand	England	A new species of Ornithocheirus.	
Ornithocheirus polyodon	Sp. nov.	Nomen dubium	Seeley	Albian	Cambridge Greensand	England	A new species of Ornithocheirus.	
Ornithocheirus reedi	Sp. nov.	Nomen dubium	Seeley	Albian	Cambridge Greensand	England	A new species of Ornithocheirus.	
Ornithocheirus scaphorhynchus	Sp. nov.	Nomen dubium	Seeley	Albian	Cambridge Greensand	England	A new species of Ornithocheirus.	
Ornithocheirus tenuirostris	Sp. nov.	Nomen dubium	Seeley	Albian	Cambridge Greensand	England	A new species of Ornithocheirus.	
Ornithocheirus xyphorhynchus	Sp. nov.	Nomen dubium	Seeley	Albian	Cambridge Greensand	England	A new species of Ornithocheirus.	
Rhabdopelix		Misidentification	Cope				At first it was thought to be a Triassic pterosaur, but is now known to be (at least in part) a kuehneosaurid	

== Synapsids ==
=== Non-mammalian ===
Name	Status	Authors	Age	Location	Notes	Images
Lystrosaurus	Valid	Cope	252 million years ago.	Antarctica; China; India; South Africa	It was a protomammal that had fangs very similar to those of a walrus.	Lystrosaurus
