= 1871 in paleontology =

List of years in paleontology	(table)
- … 1861; 1862; 1863; 1864; 1865; 1866; 1867; 1868; 1869; 1870; 1871; 1872; 1873; 1874; 1875; 1876; 1877; 1878; 1879; 1880; 1881 …
- In science 1868 1869 1870 1871 1872 1873 1874
- Art; Archaeology; Architecture; Literature; Music; Philosophy; Science; +...

Paleontology or palaeontology is the study of prehistoric life forms on Earth through the examination of plant and animal fossils. This includes the study of body fossils, tracks (ichnites), burrows, cast-off parts, fossilised feces (coprolites), palynomorphs and chemical residues. Because humans have encountered fossils for millennia, paleontology has a long history both before and after becoming formalized as a science. This article records significant discoveries and events related to paleontology that occurred or were published in the year 1871.

== Fish ==
Name	Novelty	Status	Authors	Age	Unit	Location	Notes	Images
Erismatopterus	Gen et Sp et comb nov	valid	Cope	Eocene; Ypresian	Green River Formation	US; Wyoming	A percopsid fish. The type species is E. rickseckeri Also includes Cyprinodon levatus (1870); E. rickseckeri synonymized into E. levatus (1969)	Erismatopterus levatus

== Archosauromorphs ==
=== New taxa ===
Taxon	Novelty	Status	Author(s)	Age	Unit	Location	Notes	Images
Crocodilus carcharidens	Sp. nov.	Valid	Bunzel	Campanian	Grünbach Formation	Austria	Later given the genus name Doratodon	
Zatomus		Nomen dubium	Cope				Dubious genus of non-dinosaurian archosaur	

=== Dinosaurs ===
Taxon	Novelty	Status	Author(s)	Age	Unit	Location	Notes	Images
Danubiosaurus	Gen. et sp. nov.	Nomen dubium	Bunzel	Campanian	Grünbach Formation	Austria	Believed to be a lacertilian, a possible synonym of Struthiosaurus	
Hadrosaurus cavatus	Sp. nov.	Nomen dubium	Cope	Maastrichtian	Navesink Formation?	New Jersey	A species of Hadrosaurus	
Iguanodon suessii	Sp. nov.	Valid	Bunzel	Campanian	Grünbach Formation	Austria	Later given the genus name Mochlodon	
"Megalosaurus schnaitheimii"		Nomen nudum	Bunzel	Late Jurassic	Schnaitheim	Germany	An invalid species of Megalosaurus mentioned in passing	
Struthiosaurus	Gen. et sp. nov.	Valid	Bunzel	Campanian	Grünbach Formation	Austria	A nodosaurid	

=== Pterosaurs ===
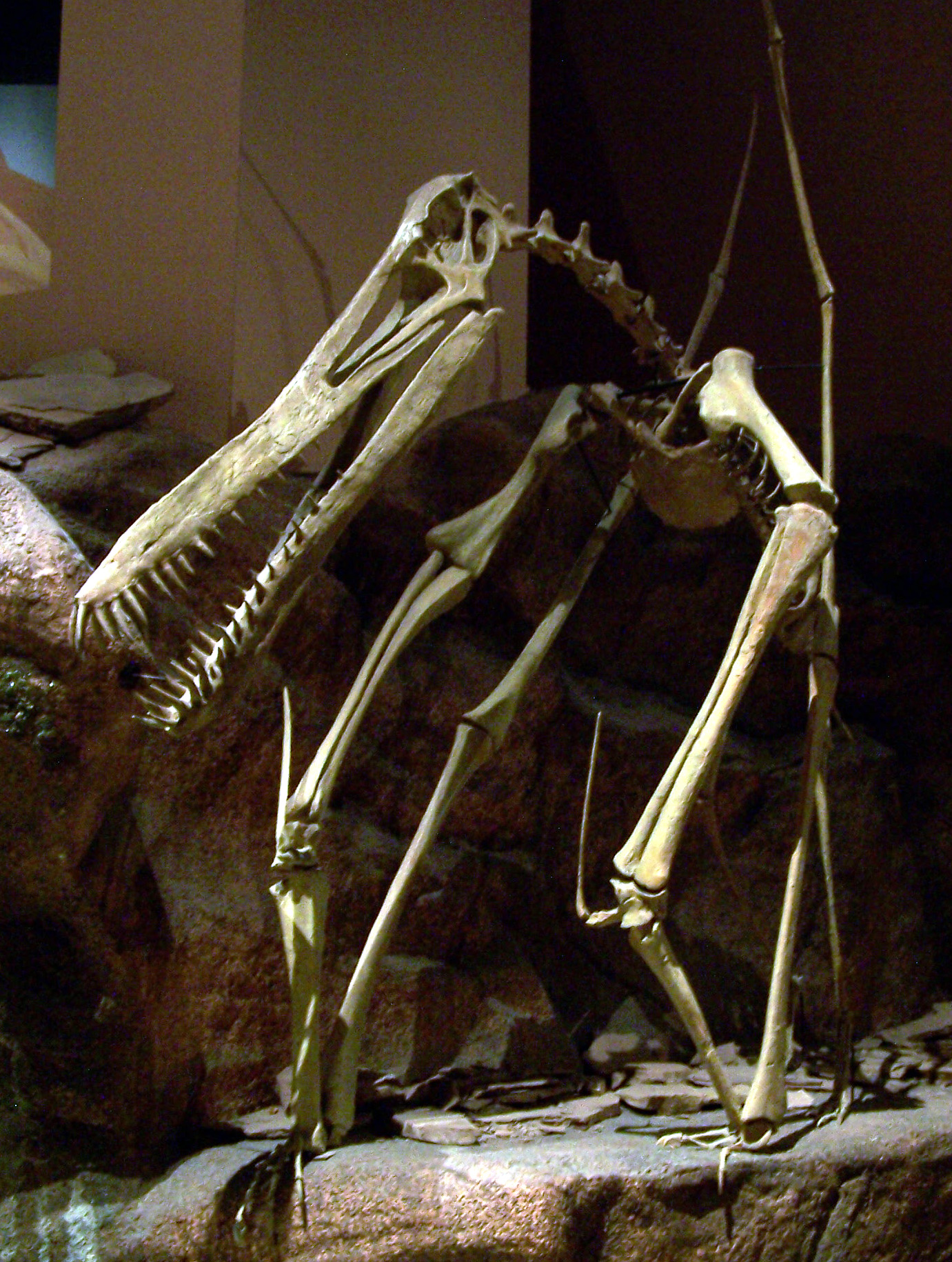
Anhanguera

Name	Status	Authors	Notes
Diopecephalus	Jr. synonym.	Seeley	Jr. synonym of Pterodactylus.
Ornithostoma	Valid	Seeley	
