= 1859 in science =

List of years in science	(table)
- … 1849; 1850; 1851; 1852; 1853; 1854; 1855; 1856; 1857; 1858; 1859; 1860; 1861; 1862; 1863; 1864; 1865; 1866; 1867; 1868; 1869 …
- Art; Archaeology; Architecture; Literature; Music; Philosophy; Science; +...

The year 1859 in science and technology involved some significant events, listed below.

== Archaeology ==
- May 26 & June 2 – Geologist Joseph Prestwich and amateur archaeologist John Evans report (to the Royal Society and Society of Antiquaries of London, respectively) the results of their investigations of gravel-pits in the Somme valley and elsewhere, extending human history back to what will become known as the Paleolithic Era.

== Astronomy ==
- August 28–September 2 – The solar storm of 1859, the largest geomagnetic solar storm on record, causes the Northern lights aurora to be visible as far south as Cuba and knocks out telegraph communication. This is also called the Carrington event, Richard Carrington being the first known person to observe solar flares, due to this storm. It is also the first major solar radiation storm to be recorded.
- Marian Albertovich Kowalski publishes the first usable method to deduce the rotation of the Milky Way.
- English clergyman Thomas William Webb publishes the first edition of his popular amateur guide Celestial Objects for Common Telescopes.
- Attempting to explain Mercury's solar orbit, French mathematician Urbain Le Verrier proposes the existence of a hypothetical planet, Vulcan, inside its orbit and amateur astronomer Edmond Modeste Lescarbault claims to have observed it on March 26.

== Biology ==
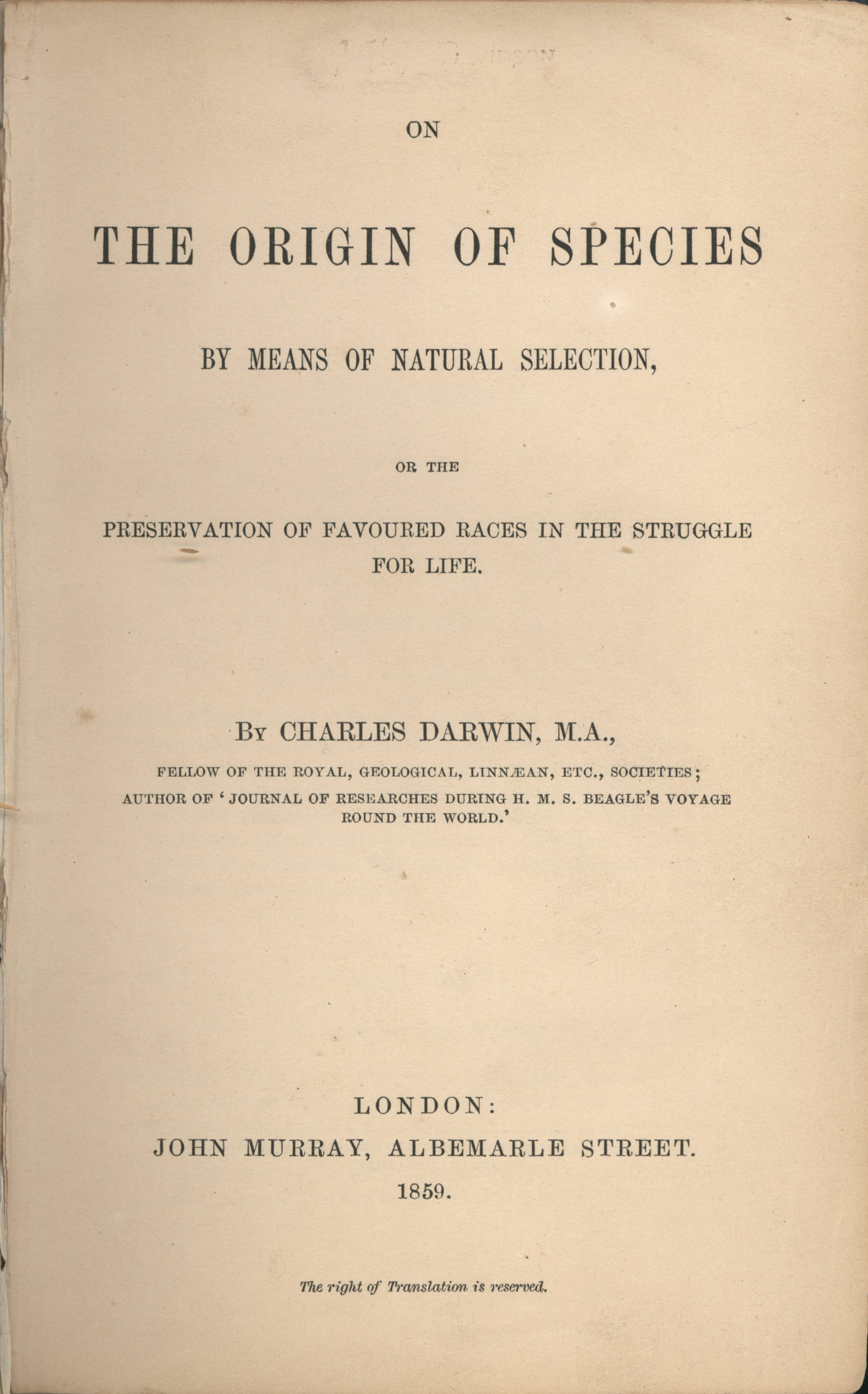

- March 21 – The Commonwealth of Pennsylvania issues the charter establishing the Zoological Society of Philadelphia, the first organization of its kind in the United States and founder of the nation's first zoo.
- November 3 – Alfred Russel Wallace's paper "On the Zoological geography of the Malay Archipelago", introducing the Wallace Line, is read by Charles Darwin to the Linnean Society of London.
- November 24 – Charles Darwin publishes On the Origin of Species.
- December – Joseph Dalton Hooker's Introductory Essay to the Flora Tasmaniae supports Darwin's theories.
- Pollen is identified as the cause of allergic rhinitis by Charles Harrison Blackley.
- Isidore Geoffroy Saint-Hilaire, in the second volume of Histoire naturelle générale des Règnes organiques, introduces the term ethology.
- Wilhelm Peters first describes the guppy (fish Poecilia reticulata) from Venezuela.
- Rudolf Virchow publishes Vorlesungen über Cellularpathologie in ihrer Begründung auf physiologischer und pathologischer Gewebelehre, a major textbook on cellular pathology.

== Chemistry ==
- Benjamin Collins Brodie reports the highly lamellar structure of thermally reduced graphite oxide.
- Aleksandr Butlerov discovers hexamine.
- August von Hofmann isolates sorbic acid.
- Gustav Robert Kirchhoff and Robert Bunsen invent an improved spectroscope.
- Pinacol is discovered through Pinacol coupling reaction by Wilhelm Rudolph Fittig.

== Climatology ==
- John Tyndall discovers that some gases block infrared radiation. He suggests that changes in the concentration of these gases could bring climate change.

== Geography ==
- The Royal Geographical Society of London is granted a Royal Charter by Queen Victoria.
- French mathematician Nicolas Auguste Tissot first proposes Tissot's indicatrix in cartography.

== Mathematics ==
- Emanoil Bacaloglu develops the "Bacaloglu pseudosphere".
- Arthur Cayley produces the first Cayley–Klein metric.
- Bernhard Riemann publishes his paper on number theory, Ueber die Anzahl der Primzahlen unter einer gegebenen Grösse ("On the Number of Primes Less Than a Given Magnitude") including the Riemann zeta function and Riemann hypothesis.

== Medicine ==
- Florence Nightingale publishes Notes on Nursing: What it is and What it is Not in London.
- District nursing begins in Liverpool, England, when philanthropist William Rathbone employs Mary Robinson to nurse the sick poor in their own homes.

== Technology ==
- May 2 – Isambard Kingdom Brunel's Royal Albert Bridge for the Cornwall Railway at Saltash in England is officially opened.
- November 24 – French ironclad Gloire launched, the first ocean-going ironclad battleship.
- Thomas Aveling of Rochester, Kent, England, produces the first traction engine, by modification of an existing machine.
- Étienne Lenoir, working in Paris, produces the first single-cylinder two-stroke Lenoir cycle gas engine with an electric ignition system.

== Physics ==
- Gustav Kirchhoff first states Kirchhoff's law of thermal radiation in several papers.

== Awards ==
- February 23 – William Armstrong created a Knight Bachelor
- Copley Medal: Wilhelm Weber
- Wollaston Medal for geology: Charles Darwin

== Births ==
- January 8 – Fanny Bullock Workman (died 1925), American mountaineer, explorer and cartographer.
- January 19 – Alice Eastwood (died 1953), Canadian-born botanist.
- February 14
  - George Washington Gale Ferris Jr. (died 1896), American civil engineer, inventor of the Ferris wheel.
  - Henry Valentine Knaggs (died 1954), English practitioner of naturopathic medicine.
- February 19 – Svante Arrhenius (died 1927), Swedish winner of the Nobel Prize in Chemistry.
- February 28 – Florian Cajori (died 1930), Swiss historian of mathematics.
- March 4 – Alexander Stepanovich Popov (died 1906), Russian physicist.
- March 10 – Frank Leverett (died 1943), American glaciologist.
- March 14 – Dorothea Pertz (died 1939), English botanist.
- April 7 – Jacques Loeb (died 1924), German physiologist.
- May 15 – Pierre Curie (died 1906), French winner of the Nobel Prize in Physics.
- May 18 – Harry Fielding Reid (died 1944), American geophysicist.
- May 28 – Edward Hopkinson (died 1922), English electrical engineer.
- June 25 – Gerhard Heilmann (died 1946), Danish paleo-ornithologist.
- July 31 – Theobald Smith (died 1934), American bacteriologist.
- September 7 – Margaret Crosfield (died 1952), British palaeontologist and geologist.
- November 22 – Cecilia Grierson (died 1934), Argentine physician and reformer.

== Deaths ==
- May 1 – John Walker (born 1781), English chemist.
- May 5 – Peter Gustav Lejeune Dirichlet (born 1805), German mathematician.
- May 6 – Alexander von Humboldt (born 1769), German naturalist and explorer.
- June 8 – Walter Hunt (born 1796), American inventor.
- July 8 – Charlotte von Siebold (born 1788), German gynecologist.
- September 10 – Thomas Nuttall (born 1786), English naturalist.
- September 15 – Isambard Kingdom Brunel (born 1806), British civil engineer.
- October 12 – Robert Stephenson (born 1803), English railway engineer.
