= 1945 in science =

The year 1945 in science and technology involved some significant events, listed below.

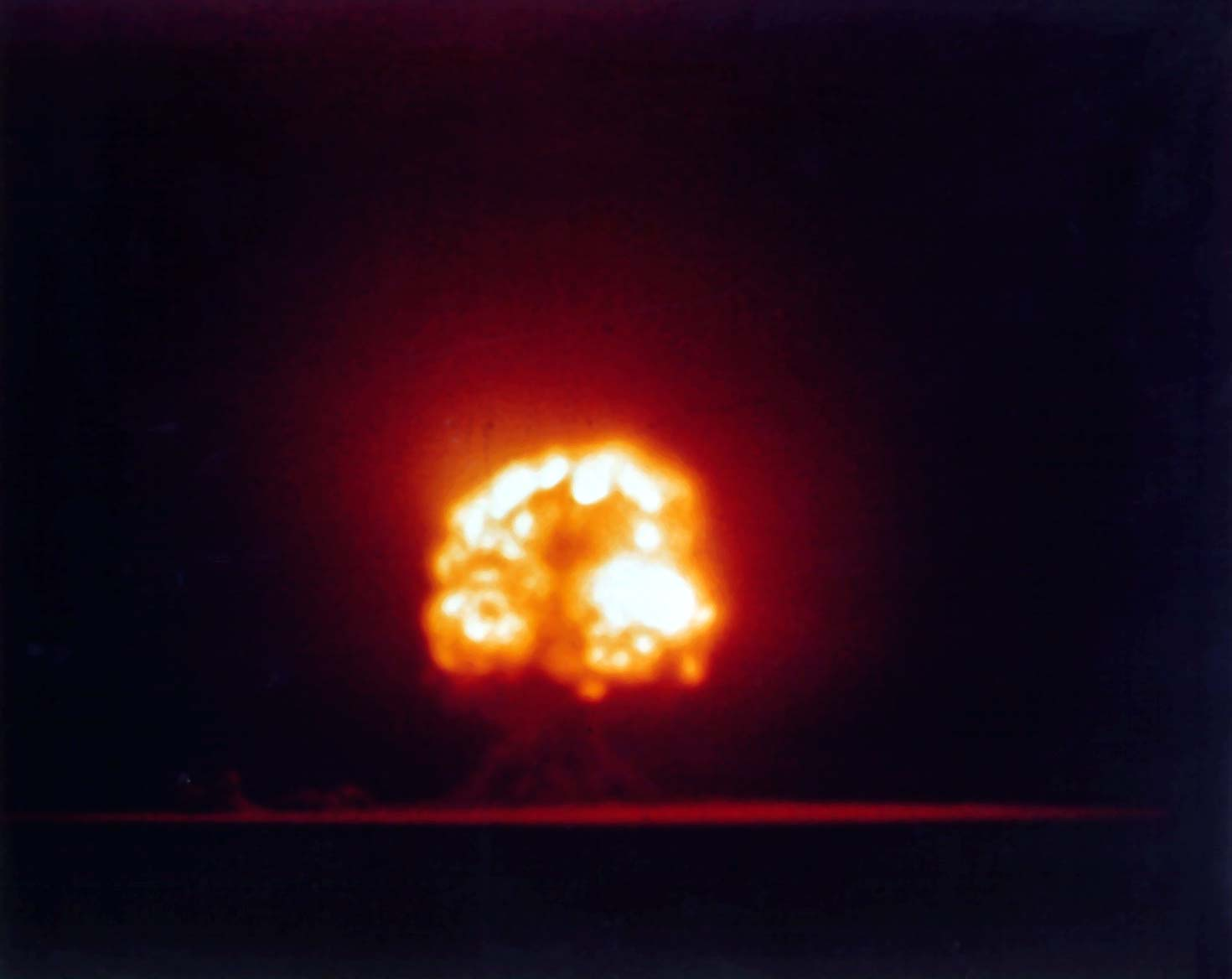
Trinity nuclear test

== Biology ==
- Salvador Edward Luria and Alfred Day Hershey independently recognize that viruses undergo mutations.

== Chemistry ==
- A team at Oak Ridge National Laboratory led by Charles Coryell discovers chemical element 61, the only one still missing between 1 and 96 on the periodic table, which they will name promethium. Found by analysis of fission products of irradiated uranium fuel, its discovery is not made public until 1947.
- Dorothy Hodgkin and C. H. (Harry) Carlisle publish the first three-dimensional molecular structure of a steroid, cholesteryl iodide. In January, Hodgkin also discovers the structure of penicillin, not published until 1949.
- A team at American Cyanamid's Lederle Laboratories, Pearl River, New York, led by Yellapragada Subbarow, obtain folic acid in a pure crystalline form.

== Computer science ==
- June 30 – Distribution of John von Neumann's First Draft of a Report on the EDVAC, containing the first published description of the logical design of a computer with stored-program and instruction data stored in the same address space within the memory (von Neumann architecture).
- July – Publication of Vannevar Bush's article "As We May Think" proposing a proto-hypertext collective memory machine which he calls 'memex'.
- November – Assembly of the world's first general purpose electronic computer, the Electronic Numerical Integrator Analyzer and Computer (ENIAC), is completed in the United States, covering 1,800 square feet (170 m^{2}) of floor space, and the first set of calculations is run on it.

== History of science and technology ==
- Douglas Guthrie's A History of Medicine is published in the U.K.

== Mathematics ==
- George Stigler solves the Stigler diet problem heuristically.

== Medicine ==
- February – Raymond L. Libby of American Cyanamid's research laboratories at Stamford, Connecticut, announces a method of orally administering the antibiotic penicillin.
- The Amsler grid is introduced for monitoring of the central visual field.

== Meteorology ==
- High-altitude west-to-east winds across Pacific, discovered by Japanese in 1942 and by Americans in 1944, are dubbed "jet stream".

== Physics ==
- July 16 – Nuclear testing: the Trinity test, the first test of an atomic bomb, using 6 kilograms of plutonium, succeeds in detonating an explosion equivalent to that of 20 kilotons of TNT.
- August 6 and 9 – Atomic bombings of Hiroshima and Nagasaki make the world aware of the power of nuclear weapons.
- August 12 – The Smyth Report is released by the United States government, informing the public of the basics of nuclear fission and its military and civilian applications, and emphasizing the role played by physics in the development of the atomic bomb.
- August 21 – American physicist Harry Daghlian accidentally drops a tungsten carbide brick onto a plutonium–gallium alloy bomb core, exposing himself to a lethal dose of neutron radiation and becoming the first known fatality due to a criticality accident 25 days later.

== Technology ==
- March 2 – The Bachem Ba 349 Natter is launched from Stetten am kalten Markt. The Natter is the first manned rocket, developed as an anti-aircraft weapon. The launch fails and the pilot dies.
- October – Arthur C. Clarke puts forward the idea of a geosynchronous communications satellite.
- November – Slinky toy first demonstrated by engineer Richard T. James in Philadelphia.
- The first desalination plant becomes operational.

== Institutions ==
- Kathleen Lonsdale and Marjory Stephenson become the first women elected as Fellows of the Royal Society of London.

== Publications ==
- Argentine physicist Ernesto Sabato publishes Uno y el Universo ("One and the Universe"), a collection of essays criticizing the apparent moral neutrality of science and warning of dehumanization in technological societies.
- First book in the New Naturalist series is published in the United Kingdom, E. B. Ford's Butterflies.

== Awards ==
- Nobel Prizes
  - Physics – Wolfgang Pauli
  - Chemistry – Artturi Ilmari Virtanen
  - Medicine – Sir Alexander Fleming, Ernst Boris Chain, Sir Howard Walter Florey

== Births ==
- January 4 – Richard R. Schrock, American chemist, Nobel Prize laureate.
- February 9 – Yoshinori Ohsumi, Japanese cell biologist, Nobel Prize laureate.
- February 26 – Michael Marmot, English epidemiologist.
- February 28 – Alexey Ekimov, Russian-born chemist, Nobel Prize laureate.
- March 31 – Edwin Catmull, American computer scientist.
- April 11 – John Krebs, English zoologist.
- April 24 – Larry Tesler (died 2020), American computer scientist.
- April 30 – Mike Smith (killed 1986 in rocket accident), American astronaut.
- May 3 – Jeffrey C. Hall, American geneticist and chronobiologist, Nobel Prize laureate.
- May 20 – Anton Zeilinger, Austrian quantum physicist, Nobel Prize laureate.
- July 7 – Adele Goldberg, American computer scientist.
- July 19 – Richard Henderson, Scottish molecular biologist, Nobel Prize laureate.
- August 1 – Douglas Osheroff, American physicist, Nobel Prize laureate.
- September 18 – John McAfee (presumed suicide 2021), British American computer programmer.
- September 19 – Ruxandra Sireteanu (died 2008), Romanian neuroscientist.
- October 2 – Martin Hellman, American cryptologist.
- Undated – Lyn Evans, Welsh physicist.

== Deaths ==
- March 23 – Sir Napier Shaw (born 1854), English meteorologist.
- March 24 – F. Percy Smith (born 1880), English naturalist and pioneer microcinematographer.
- April 22 – Wilhelm Cauer (born 1900), German mathematician and electronic engineer, shot during Battle of Berlin.
- May 12 – Julius Fromm (born 1883), German businessman, inventor known for the Condom machine
- May 14 – Isis Pogson (born 1852), English astronomer and meteorologist.
- August 4 – Gerhard Gentzen (born 1909), German mathematician, starved in prison camp.
- August 10 – Robert Goddard (born 1882), American rocket scientist, throat cancer.
- August 31 – Stefan Banach (born 1892), Polish mathematician, lung cancer.
- September 15 – Richard Friedrich Johannes Pfeiffer (born 1858), German physician and bacteriologist.
- September 24 – Hans Geiger (born 1882), German inventor of the Geiger counter.
- October 1 – Walter Bradford Cannon (born 1871), American physiologist.
- November 20 – Francis William Aston (born 1877), English chemist, Nobel Prize laureate.
- December 4 – Thomas Hunt Morgan (born 1866), American biologist, Nobel Prize laureate.
- December 11 – Charles Fabry (born 1867), French optical physicist.
- December 21/22 – Arthur Korn (born 1870), German-born inventor.
