= 1781 in science =

The year 1781 in science and technology involved some significant events.

== Astronomy ==
- March 13 – William Herschel observes Uranus (although initially recording it as a comet).
- March 20 – Pierre Méchain discovers dwarf galaxy NGC 5195.
- Charles Messier's final catalogue of Messier objects is published.
- Christian Mayer's catalogue of binary stars is published.

== Biology ==
- Felice Fontana uses a microscope to describe the axon of a brain cell.
- John Latham begins publication of A General Synopsis of Birds.

== Chemistry ==
- Archibald Cochrane, 9th Earl of Dundonald is granted a British patent for the manufacture of coal tar.
- Carl Wilhelm Scheele ascertains that a new acid can be made from tungstenite, leading to the discovery of tungsten in 1783.
- Autumn – Peter Jacob Hjelm isolates molybdenum.

== Awards ==
- Copley Medal: William Herschel

== Births ==
- January 30 – Adelbert von Chamisso, poet and botanist (died 1838)
- February 17 – Rene Theophile Hyacinthe Laennec, French physician, inventor of the stethoscope (died 1826).
- May 29 – John Walker, English chemist (died 1859)
- June 9 – George Stephenson, English locomotive engineer (died 1848)
- June 21 – Siméon Poisson, mathematician (died 1840)
- July 6 – Thomas Stamford Raffles, founder of the Zoological Society of London (died 1826)
- September 14 – James Walker, Scottish civil engineer (died 1862)
- October 5 – Bernhard Bolzano, mathematician (died 1848)
- December 11 – David Brewster, Scottish physicist (died 1868)

== Deaths ==
- May 27 – Giovanni Battista Beccaria, Italian physicist (born 1716)
