= 1773 in science =

The year 1773 in science and technology involved some significant events.

== Astronomy ==
Whirlpool Galaxy

- October 13 – French astronomer Charles Messier discovers the Whirlpool Galaxy (pictured), an interacting, grand design spiral galaxy located at a distance of approximately 23 million light-years in the constellation Canes Venatici.
- Lagrange presents his work on the secular equation of the Moon to the Académie française, introducing the idea of the potential of a body. He also publishes on the attraction of ellipsoids.

== Chemistry ==
- Hilaire Rouelle discovers urea.
- Carl Wilhelm Scheele and Joseph Priestley independently isolate oxygen, called by Priestley "dephlogisticated air" and Scheele "fire air".
- Antoine Baumé publishes his textbook Chymie expérimentale et raisonnée in Paris.

== Exploration ==
- January 17 – English Captain James Cook becomes the first European explorer to cross the Antarctic Circle.
- Spring – English Captain Tobias Furneaux explores the coast of Van Diemen's Land.
- June 4 – September 30 – British Royal Navy Phipps expedition towards the North Pole, which produces the first scientific description of the polar bear and the ivory gull.

== Linguistics ==
- Scottish judge James Burnett, Lord Monboddo, begins publication of Of the Origin and Progress of Language, a contribution to evolutionary ideas of the Enlightenment.

== Mathematics ==
- Lagrange considers a functional determinant of order 3, a special case of a Jacobian. He also proves the expression for the volume of a tetrahedron with one of the vertices at the origin as one sixth of the absolute value of the determinant formed by the coordinates of the other three vertices.

== Medicine ==
- October 12 – North America's first insane asylum opens for 'Persons of Insane and Disordered Minds' in Williamsburg, Virginia.
- Medical Society of London founded by John Coakley Lettsom.
- Louis-Bernard Guyton de Morveau proposes the use of "muriatic acid gas" (hydrogen chloride) for fumigation of buildings.

== Technology ==
- David Hartley patents a method of fireproofing construction for buildings and ships in Britain.

== Institutions ==
- Istanbul Technical University is established (under the original name of Royal School of Naval Engineering) as the world's first comprehensive institution of higher learning dedicated to engineering education.

== Awards ==
- Copley Medal: John Walsh
- John Harrison receives the Longitude prize for his invention of the marine chronometer.

== Births ==
- January 29 – Friedrich Mohs, German mineralogist (died 1839)
- February 24 - Jean Boniface Textoris, French military surgeon (died 1828)
- April 9 – Marie Boivin, French midwife, inventor and obstetrics writer (died 1841)
- May 19 – Arthur Aikin, English chemist and mineralogist (died 1854)
- June 13 – Thomas Young, English physicist (died 1829)
- June 29 (bapt.) – John Bostock, English physician and geologist (died 1846)
- July 23 – Thomas Brisbane, Scottish astronomer and Governor of New South Wales (died 1860)
- August 23 – Abraham Colles, Anglo-Irish surgeon (died 1843)
- October 28 – Simon Goodrich, English mechanical engineer (died 1847)
- December 21 – Robert Brown, Scottish botanist (died 1858)
- December 27 – George Cayley, English pioneer of heavier-than-air flight (died 1857)

== Deaths ==
- June 21 – Jorge Juan y Santacilia, Spanish naval officer, mathematician, scientist, astronomer and engineer (born 1713)
- July 16 – Nils Rosén von Rosenstein, Swedish pediatrician (born 1706)
- July 23 – George Edwards, English naturalist (born 1693)
