= 1944 in science =

The year 1944 in science and technology involved some significant events, listed below.

== Astronomy ==
- Hendrik van de Hulst predicts the 21 cm hyperfine line of neutral interstellar hydrogen.

== Biology ==
- February 1 – Oswald T. Avery and colleagues publish the Avery–MacLeod–McCarty experiment showing that a DNA molecule can carry an inheritable trait to a living organism. This is important because many biologists thought that proteins were the hereditary material and nucleic acids too simple chemically to serve as genetic storage molecules.
- The lipopolysaccharide character of enteric endotoxins is elucidated by M. J. Shear.
- Erwin Schrödinger publishes What is Life?, containing conceptual discussion of the genetic code and of negentropy.
- Donald Griffin with G. W. Pierce demonstrate that bats use high-frequency sound in a technique which Griffin describes as echolocation.
- Last known evidence for existence of the Asiatic lion in the wild in Iran (Khuzestan province).

== Chemistry ==
- February – Lars Onsager publishes the exact solution to the two-dimensional Ising model.
- Americium discovered by Glenn T. Seaborg, et al.

== Computer science ==
- August 7 – IBM dedicates the first program-controlled calculator, the Automatic Sequence Controlled Calculator, best known as the Harvard Mark I.

== Geology ==
- March 18 – Last eruption of Mount Vesuvius.

== History of science ==
- November 4 – The Whipple Museum of the History of Science is established when Robert Whipple presents his collection of scientific instruments to the University of Cambridge, England.
- C. Doris Hellman publishes her Columbia University thesis The Comet of 1577: Its Place in the History of Astronomy.

== Mathematics ==
- John von Neumann and Oskar Morgenstern's book Theory of Games and Economic Behavior is published by Princeton University Press.

== Medicine ==
- November 19 – Minnesota Starvation Experiment begins.
- Hans Asperger describes Asperger syndrome.
- Franz Josef Kallmann describes Kallmann syndrome.
- David S. Sheridan invents the disposable plastic tracheal tube catheter.
- Dorothea and Alexander Leighton's book Navajo at the Door is "the earliest example of applied medical anthropology".

== Meteorology ==
- June 5 – Group Captain James Stagg correctly forecasts a brief improvement in weather conditions over the English Channel which permits the following day's Normandy landings to take place.
- August 6 – Ball lightning observed in Uppsala, Sweden.

== Physics ==
- November 6 – Hanford Site in Washington (state) produces its first plutonium.

== Technology ==
- March 27 – In Sweden, Ruben Rausing patents Erik Wallenberg's method of packaging milk in paper, origin of the company Tetra Pak.
- June 13 – First operational use of the German V-1 flying bomb, the first operational cruise missile, containing a gyroscope guidance system and propelled by a simple pulsejet engine.
- September 8 – First operational use of the German V-2 rocket, the first ballistic missile. On June 20 one has become the first man-made object to cross the Kármán line and reach the edge of space.
- December 9 – First flight of the Heinkel He 162 Volksjäger, the second jet engined fighter aircraft to be introduced by the Luftwaffe in World War II.
- First operational use of a snorkel on a submarine.

== Awards ==
- Nobel Prizes
  - Physics – Isidor Isaac Rabi
  - Chemistry – Otto Hahn
  - Medicine – Joseph Erlanger, Herbert Spencer Gasser

== Births ==
- January 5 – David Canter, English pioneer environmental and investigative psychologist.
- February 8 – Howard Dalton (died 2008), English microbiologist.
- February 15 – Sigurd Hofmann, German physicist.
- March 7 – Michael Rosbash, American geneticist and chronobiologist, recipient of the Nobel Prize in Physiology or Medicine.
- March 23 – Francis Halzen, Belgian-born particle physicist, recipient of the Nobel Prize in Physics.
- June 1 – Colin Blakemore, English neurobiologist (died 2022).
- June 5 – Whitfield Diffie, American cryptographer.
- June 6 – Phillip Allen Sharp, American geneticist and molecular biologist, recipient of the Nobel Prize in Physiology or Medicine.
- June 22 – Gérard Mourou, French electrical engineer, recipient of the Nobel Prize in Physics.
- July 13 – Ernő Rubik, Hungarian inventor and architect.
- August 24 – Gregory Jarvis (died 1986), American astronaut.
- October 11 – William T. Greenough (died 2013), American neuroscientist.
- October 16 – Elizabeth Loftus, American psychologist.
- October 21 – Jean-Pierre Sauvage, French coordination chemist, recipient of the Nobel Prize in Chemistry.
- December 19 – Richard Leakey (died 2022), Kenyan palaeoanthropologist.
- December 28 – Kary Mullis (died 2019), American biochemist, recipient of the Nobel Prize in Chemistry.

== Deaths ==
- January 19 – Emily Winifred Dickson (born 1866), British gynaecologist.
- January 20 – James McKeen Cattell (born 1860), American psychologist.
- February 8 – Bernard Sachs (born 1858), American neurologist.
- March – John R. F. Jeffreys (born 1918), British mathematician and cryptanalyst (tuberculosis).
- March 2 – Ida Maclean (born 1877), English biochemist.
- March 5 – Ernst Cohen (born 1869), Dutch Jewish chemist (in Auschwitz concentration camp).
- March 29 – Grace Chisholm Young (born 1868), English mathematician.
- April 16 – Percy Lane Oliver (born 1878), British pioneer of voluntary blood donation
- August 23 – Margarete Zuelzer (born 1877), German Jewish microbiologist (in Westerbork transit camp).
- June 18 – Harry Fielding Reid (born 1859), American geophysicist.
- July 25 – Jakob Johann von Uexküll (born 1864), Baltic German pioneer of biosemiotics.
- November 2 – Thomas Midgley Jr. (born 1889), American chemist and inventor.
- November 22 – Sir Arthur Eddington (born 1882), English astrophysicist.
