= 1769 in science =

The year 1769 in science and technology involved some significant events, listed below.

== Astronomy ==
- March 4 – French astronomer Charles Messier first records the Orion Nebula (Messier 42).
- June 3 – Transit of Venus is observed from many places in order to obtain data for measuring the distance from the Earth to the Sun. Those taking part include
  - Jean-Baptiste Chappe d'Auteroche at San José del Cabo, Baja California
  - James Cook and Charles Green on Tahiti
  - Jeremiah Dixon and William Bayly in northern Norway, Dixon at Hammerfest and Bayly at North Cape
  - Maximilian Hell and János Sajnovics in Vardø, Norway
  - Guillaume Le Gentil in Pondicherry, India: Le Gentil had hoped to go to Manila in the Philippines but was turned away by the local Spanish colonial governor. The weather in Pondicherry is cloudy that day. Le Gentil had also missed the 1761 transit through bad luck.
  - Alexandre Guy Pingré in Haiti
  - William Wales and Joseph Dymond at Prince of Wales Fort on Hudson Bay
  - Anders Johan Lexell and Christian Mayer in Saint Petersburg; with other members of Russian Academy of Sciences at eight other locations in the Russian Empire
  - Members of the American Philosophical Society at three locations

The transit is followed five hours later by a total solar eclipse visible from Britain.

- November 9 – Transit of Mercury. James Cook observes this from Mercury Bay in New Zealand.
- Pluto's 8th complete orbit around the Sun from its present-day position

== Chemistry ==
- Carl Wilhelm Scheele discovers a method of mass-producing phosphorus.
- Approximate date – Britannia metal is first produced, in Sheffield, England.

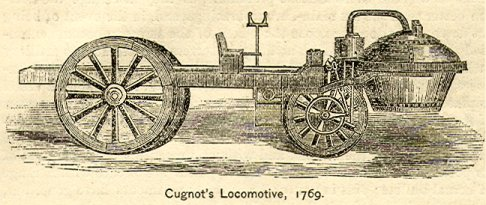
Cugnot's first steam-wagon, or fardier, of 1769.

== Technology ==
- April 29 – James Watt is granted a British patent for "A method of lessening the consumption of steam in steam engines" – the separate condenser, a key improvement (first devised by Watt in 1765) which stimulates the Industrial Revolution. In September he completes a full-size experimental engine at Kinneil House in Scotland.
- July 3 – Richard Arkwright is granted a British patent for a water-powered spinning frame able to spin thread mechanically.
- October 23 – Nicolas-Joseph Cugnot demonstrates a steam-powered artillery tractor (or 'automobile') in France (see drawing).
- Wolfgang von Kempelen begins development of his speaking machine.

== Exploration ==
- March 16 – Louis Antoine de Bougainville returns to Saint-Malo following a three-year circumnavigation of the world with the ships Boudeuse and Étoile, with the loss of only seven out of 330 men.

== Awards ==
- Copley Medal: William Hewson

== Births ==
- January 1
  - Marie-Louise Lachapelle, French midwife (died 1821)
  - Jane Marcet, née Haldimand, English popular science writer (died 1858)
- March 23 – William Smith, English geologist (died 1839)
- March 29 – Friedrich Accum, German chemist (died 1838)
- April 25 – Marc Isambard Brunel, French-born engineer (died 1849)
- August 23 – Georges Cuvier, French zoologist (died 1832)
- September 14 – Alexander von Humboldt, German naturalist and explorer (died 1859)
