= 1932 in science =

The year 1932 in science and technology involved some significant events, listed below.

== Astronomy and space sciences ==
- August 10 – A 5.1 kg chondrite-type meteorite breaks into fragments and strikes earth near the town of Archie, Missouri.
- Estonian astronomer Ernst Öpik postulates that long-period comets originate in an orbiting cloud (the Öpik–Oort cloud) at the outermost edge of the Solar System.

== Biology ==
- English geneticist C. D. Darlington publishes Recent Advances in Cytology, describing the mechanics of chromosomal crossover and its role in evolutionary science.
- English geneticist J. B. S. Haldane publishes The Causes of Evolution, unifying the findings of Mendelian genetics with those of evolutionary science.
- American physiologist Walter Bradford Cannon publishes The Wisdom of the Body, developing and popularising the concept of homeostasis.
- A flock of Soay sheep is translocated from Soay to Hirta (also in the depopulated archipelago of St Kilda, Scotland) by conservationist John Crichton-Stuart, 4th Marquess of Bute.
- The heath hen becomes extinct in North America.

== Earth sciences ==
- Braggite is first described, the first mineral discovered with the assistance of X rays.

== Mathematics ==
- Menger-Nöbeling theorem.
- John von Neumann makes foundational contributions to ergodic theory in a series of papers.
- Rózsa Péter presents the results of her paper on recursive function theory, "Rekursive Funktionen," to the International Congress of Mathematicians in Zurich, Switzerland.
- December – Marian Rejewski of the Polish Biuro Szyfrów applies pure mathematics – permutation group theory – to breaking the German armed forces' Enigma machine ciphers.

== Medicine ==
- January 5 – The pathology of Cushing's syndrome is first described by Harvey Cushing.
- American gastroenterologist Burrill Bernard Crohn and colleagues describe a series of patients with "regional ileitis", inflammation of the terminal ileum, the area most commonly affected by the condition which will become known as Crohn's disease.
- Grace Medes discovers tyrosinosis, the metabolic disorder later known as Type I tyrosinemia.
- Swedish neurosurgeon Herbert Olivecrona performs the first surgical excision of an intracranial arteriovenous malformation.
- Rudolph Schindler introduces the first semi-flexible gastroscope, in Germany.
- Commencement of the 40-year Tuskegee syphilis experiment by the U.S. Public Health Service to study the natural progression of untreated syphilis in poor African-American sharecroppers in Alabama without their informed consent.
- First published use of the term Medical genetics, in an article by Madge Thurlow Macklin.
- Gerhard Domagk develops a chemotherapeutic cure for streptococcus

== Pharmacology ==
- Albert Szent-Györgyi and Charles Glen King identify ascorbic acid as an anti-scorbutic.
- December 25 – IG Farben file a patent application in Germany for the medical application of the first sulfonamide drug, Sulfonamidochrysoidine (KI-730; which will be marketed as Prontosil), following Gerhard Domagk's laboratory demonstration of its properties as an antibiotic at the conglomerate's Bayer laboratories.

== Physics ==
- April 14 – John Cockcroft and Ernest Walton, utilising a Cockcroft–Walton generator at the Cavendish Laboratory in the University of Cambridge (England), focus a proton beam on lithium and split its nucleus.
- May – Radio Luxembourg begins high-powered longwave test transmissions aimed directly at the British Isles which prove, inadvertently, to be the first radio modification of the ionosphere.
- May 10 – James Chadwick, working at the Cavendish Laboratory in the University of Cambridge, reports the existence of the neutron. Werner Heisenberg explains its symmetries by introducing the concept of isospin.
- August 2 – The positron is observed by Carl Anderson.
- November 1 – The Kennedy–Thorndike experiment is published, showing that measured time as well as length is affected by motion, in accordance with the theory of special relativity.
- John von Neumann rigorously establishes a mathematical framework for quantum mechanics in Mathematische Grundlagen der Quantenmechanik.
- Zero-length springs are invented, revolutionizing seismometers and gravimeters.

== Awards ==
- Nobel Prizes
  - Physics – Werner Karl Heisenberg
  - Chemistry – Irving Langmuir
  - Medicine – Sir Charles Sherrington, Edgar Adrian

== Births ==
- January 16 – Dian Fossey (murdered 1985), American primatologist.
- February 7 – Alfred Worden (died 2020), American astronaut.
- February 10 – Robert Taylor (died 2017), American computer scientist.
- March 10 – Udupi Ramachandra Rao (died 2017), Indian space scientist.
- March 14 – Joseph Bryan Nelson (died 2015), British ornithologist.
- March 15 – Alan Bean (died 2018), American astronaut.
- March 21 – Walter Gilbert, American chemist and Nobel laureate
- March 24 – Lodewijk van den Berg (died 2022), Dutch-born American chemical engineer and astronaut
- April 26 – Michael Smith (died 2000), English-born biochemist, recipient of the 1993 Nobel Prize in Chemistry.
- May 22 – Robert Spitzer (died 2015), American psychiatrist.
- July 10 – Ioan Pușcaș (died 2015), Romanian gastroenterologist.
- July 31 – John Searle, American philosopher of the mind and language.
- August 4 – Frances E. Allen (died 2020), American computer scientist, Turing Award winner.
- August 15 – Robert L. Forward (died 2002), American science fiction author and physicist.
- August 18 – Luc Montagnier (died 2022), French virologist and joint recipient of the 2008 Nobel Prize in Physiology or Medicine for the discovery of the human immunodeficiency virus (HIV).
- September 18 – Nikolai Rukavishnikov (died 2002), Russian cosmonaut.
- September 29 – Rainer Weiss, German-born American physicist, joint recipient of the 2017 Nobel Prize in Physics for detection of gravitational waves.
- October 1 – Biswa Ranjan Nag (died 2004), Indian physicist.
- October 3 – Terence English, South African-born cardiac surgeon.
- October 13 – John G. Thompson, American mathematician.
- November 6 – François Englert, Belgian theoretical physicist, joint recipient of the 2013 Nobel Prize in Physics for discovery of the Higgs mechanism.
- December 15 – John Meurig Thomas (died 2020), Welsh physical chemist.

== Deaths ==
- February 29 – George Claridge Druce (born 1850), English botanist.
- March 14 – George Eastman (born 1854), American photography pioneer (suicide).
- April 3 – Wilhelm Ostwald (born 1853), Baltic German chemist.
- April 20 – Giuseppe Peano (born 1858), Italian mathematician.
- May 29 – Cuthbert Christy (born 1863), English medical investigator, zoologist and explorer.
- June 21 – Major Taylor (born 1878), African American racing cyclist.
- July 9 – King Camp Gillette (born 1855), American inventor.
- July 14 – Fran Jesenko (born 1875), Slovene botanist and plant geneticist.
- July 22 – Reginald Fessenden (born 1866), Canadian American radio broadcasting pioneer.
- August 9 – John Charles Fields (born 1863), Canadian mathematician.
- September 16 – Sir Ronald Ross (born 1857), British physiologist.
- November 12 – Sir Dugald Clerk (born 1854), Scottish-born mechanical engineer.
