= Zatomus =

Zatomus Temporal range: Late Triassic

Scientific classification
- Domain: Eukaryota
- Kingdom: Animalia
- Phylum: Chordata
- Class: Reptilia
- Clade: Archosauria
- Clade: Pseudosuchia
- Genus: †Zatomus; Cope, 1871

Species
- Z. sarcophagus Cope, 1871 (type)

Extinct genus of reptiles

Zatomus is an extinct genus of pseudosuchian from the Late Triassic. Fossil remains have been found in North Carolina, United States. It is classified as a rauisuchian, a type of large carnivorous thecodontian archosaur.

== History ==
The fossils of Zatomus were discovered in North Carolina by American geologist Ebenezer Emmons, who described and illustrated the fossils. These fossils consisted of teeth and dermal plates.

Edward Drinker Cope thought the fossil teeth resembled those of a dinosaur similar to Megalosaurus, Laelaps, or the rauisuchian Teratosaurus, and in 1871 he named Zatomus sarcophagus, based on the teeth.

These fossil teeth have subsequently been classified as belonging to rauisuchians.
