= 1861 in philosophy =

== Births ==
- 15 February – Alfred North Whitehead (died 1947)
- 27 February — Rudolf Steiner (died 1925)
