= 1855 in philosophy =

1855 in philosophy

== Publications ==
- Søren Kierkegaard, The Moment

== Deaths ==
- February 23 - Carl Friedrich Gauss (born 1777)
- November 11 - Søren Kierkegaard (born 1813)
