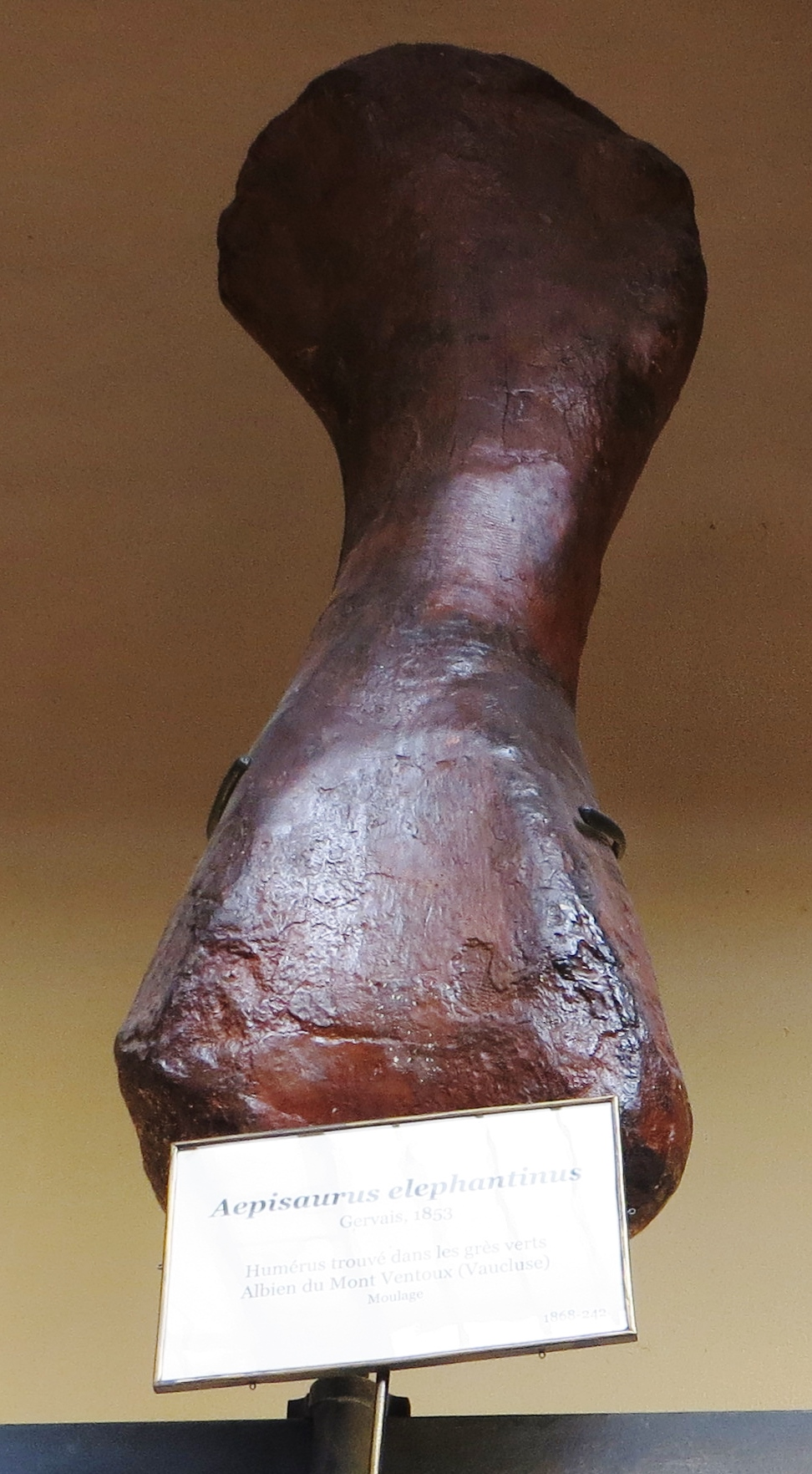
- Limb bone of Aepisaurus.

Scientific classification
- Kingdom: Animalia
- Phylum: Chordata
- Class: Reptilia
- Clade: Dinosauria
- Clade: Saurischia
- Clade: †Sauropodomorpha
- Clade: †Sauropoda
- Genus: †Aepisaurus; Gervais, 1852
- Species: †A. elephantinus

Binomial name
- †Aepisaurus elephantinus Gervais, 1852

= Aepisaurus =

Aepisaurus Temporal range: Early Cretaceous, 100.5 Ma

Extinct species of reptile

Aepisaurus (/ˌiːpɪˈsɔːrəs/; derived from the Greek: αἰπεινός, aipeinós - 'lofty/high' and σαυρος, sauros - 'lizard', i.e. "lofty lizard") was a genus of sauropod dinosaur from the Albian-age Lower Cretaceous Grès vert of Département du Vaucluse, France, around 100.5 million years ago. It is an obscure genus from an unknown family, represented by a single humerus, now partly lost. Despite its lack of popularity, or perhaps because of it, it has been misspelled several ways in the scientific literature, with multiple dates given to the year of description as well.

== History ==
French paleontologist Paul Gervais described the new genus in 1852 based on a humerus found at Mont Ventoux, near Bédoin, by Prosper Renaux (1793–1852) in 1841. The bone was 90 cm (35.43 in) long, 33 cm (13 in) wide at the proximal end, 15 cm (5.91 in) wide in the middle, and 25 cm (9.84 cm) wide at the distal end. From the same locality, he referred a conical tooth he thought could belong to a larger second species, and from elsewhere added to A. sp. (a practice used to denote that the remains belong to a certain genus, but the species is not known) a partial humerus and ulna. The proximal part of the humerus of Aepisaurus elephantinus is housed in the University of Montpellier (BED01). A plaster cast of the complete specimen is also displayed in the Muséum national d'Histoire naturelle in Paris (MNHN 1868–242).

Since the appearance of Titanosauridae, it has typically been referred to that family because the slender humerus resembles that of Laplatasaurus. However, as noted by McIntosh (1990), the bone is also like that of Camarasaurus and some brachiosaurids.

Le Loeuff (1993), in his review of European titanosaurs, could not locate the type specimen, and found that the illustration of it did not allow it to be placed with any sauropod group. Based on proportions, it could represent either a camarasaurid or titanosaurid. The additional remains referred to it by Gervais were removed, and in the case of the tooth, probably belonged to a crocodilian. Although McIntosh considered the genus to be Sauropoda incertae sedis (uncertain placement), an influential 2004 review agreed with Le Loeuff and listed the genus as a dubious sauropod. A 2022 review considered it an indeterminate eusauropod or neosauropod without comment.

== Paleobiology ==
As a sauropod, Aepisaurus would have been a large quadrupedal herbivore.

== Misspellings and other errata ==
The date of description is given as 1853 by Glut (1997) and some online sources, although the Paleobiology Database and both editions of The Dinosauria use 1852.

The genus is commonly misspelled Aepysaurus; both editions of The Dinosauria and a major review use this misspelling. Increasing the confusion, Friedrich von Huene once (1932) used Aepyosaurus, and Glut incorrectly gives the species as A. elephantius.
