= Emanuel Bunzel =

Austrian paleontologist

- Born: 1828; Prague, Kingdom of Bohemia
- Died: 1895 (aged 66–67)
- Occupation: Paleontologist
- Years active: 1866/1870–1895

Emanuel Bunzel (1828–1895), was an Austrian paleontologist.

== Biography ==
Emanuel Bunzel was born in Prague, Kingdom of Bohemia (today the Czech Republic), in 1828.

His work on the Grünbach Formation begann in 1871, with the publication of a skull fragment found in an Austrian coal mine in 1859 by colleagues Ferdinand Stoliczka and Eduard Suess as the type specimen for the dinosaur genus Struthiosaurus. Another dinosaur he described initially as a species of Iguanodon (I. suessii) has since been reassigned to the genus Mochlodon, also found in 1859 alongside Struthiosaurus. Also in 1871, he named the crocodylomorph Crocodilus carcharidens (now Doratodon), the pterosaur "Ornithocheirus" buenzeli and the theropod dinosaur Megalosaurus schnaitheimi, now believed to have been based upon remains referable to the metriorhynchid crocodylomorph Dakosaurus maximus.

Bunzel died in 1895, aged 66–67.
