= 1859 in philosophy =

1859 in philosophy

== Publications ==
- John Stuart Mill, On Liberty (1859)
- Charles Darwin, On the Origin of Species (1859) [Note: On the Origin of Species is not a philosophical text per se, but is nevertheless listed here for its enormous influence on philosophical thought.]

== Births ==
- January 13 - Kostis Palamas (died 1943)
- April 8 - Edmund Husserl (died 1938)
- October 18 - Henri Bergson (died 1941)
- October 20 - John Dewey (died 1952)

== Deaths ==
- April 16 - Alexis de Tocqueville (born 1805)
- May 6 - Alexander von Humboldt (born 1769)
