= William Bullock (inventor) =

American inventor (1813–1867)

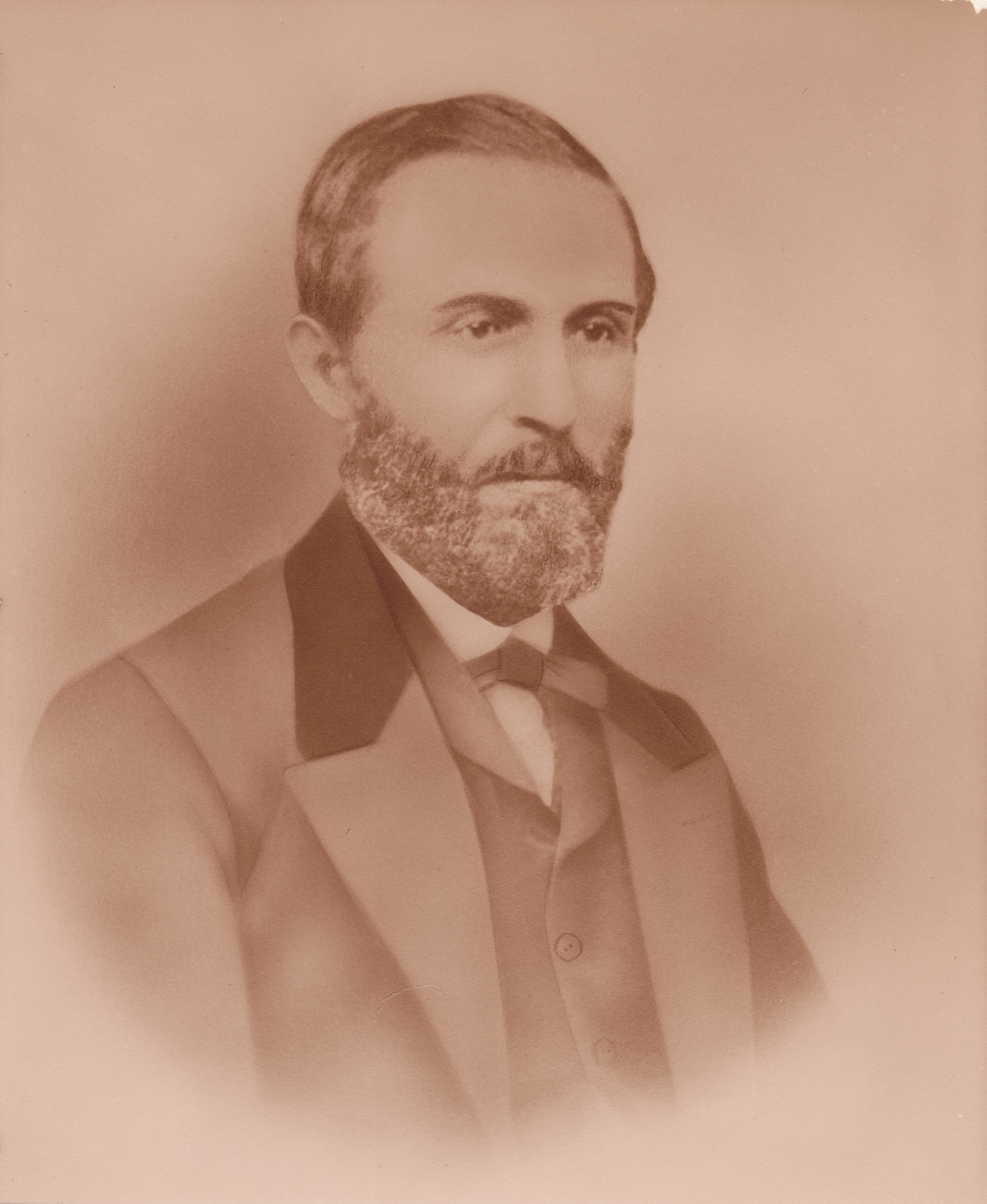
- Undated portrait
- Born: 1813; Greenville, New York, U.S.
- Died: April 12, 1867 (aged 53–54); Pittsburgh, Pennsylvania, U.S.
- Resting place: Union Dale Cemetery, Pittsburgh
- Occupation: Inventor
- Known for: The web rotary press
- Spouses: Angeline Kimball (m. c. 1834–1850); Emily Kimball (m. c. 1850)
- Children: 13

William Bullock (1813 – April 12, 1867) was an American inventor whose 1863 improvements to Richard March Hoe's rotary printing press helped revolutionize the printing industry due to its great speed and efficiency. A few years after his invention, Bullock was accidentally killed by his own web rotary press.

== Biography ==
William Bullock was born in Greenville, New York in 1813. Orphaned at an early age, he was raised by his brother. In his youth, he worked with his brother as a machinist and iron-founder. His fascination with books led him to acquire much knowledge of mechanics. At age 21, he was running his own machinery shop in Savannah, Georgia. At this time, Bullock invented a shingle-cutting machine, but his business went broke when he was unable to market it.

While in Georgia, Bullock married Angeline Kimball and had seven children with her. When his wife died in 1850, he married Angeline's sister Emily, who bore him six children.

Bullock returned to New York and designed such devices as a cotton and hay press, a seed planter, and a lathe cutting machine. He also invented a grain drill, which won him a prize from the Franklin Institute in 1849. Shortly after this, he became involved in the newspaper world, and began working as an editor for a Philadelphia newspaper, The Banner of the Union.

The paper later moved to Catskill, New York. In 1853, Bullock began working on a hand-turned wooden printing press that had a self-feeder, an idea that laid the foundation for his later presses, one of which he designed in 1860 for the national publication Frank Leslie's Illustrated Weekly.

Bullock moved to Pittsburgh, and in a couple of years, perfected a printing press called the web rotary press. Richard March Hoe had invented the rotary press in 1843, but Bullock's press was an improvement over Hoe's design. Bullock's press allowed for continuous large rolls of paper to be automatically fed through the rollers, eliminating the laborious hand-feeding system of earlier presses. The press was self-adjusting, printed on both sides, folded the paper, and a sharp serrated knife that rarely needed sharpening cut sheets with rapid precision. The press could print up to 12,000 sheets an hour; later improvements raised the speed to up to 30,000 sheets an hour.

== Death ==
Bullock was killed by his own invention. On April 3, 1867 he was making adjustments to one of his new presses that was being installed for the Philadelphia Public Ledger newspaper. Bullock tried to kick a driving belt onto a pulley. His leg was crushed when it became caught in the machine. After a few days, he developed gangrene. On April 12, 1867, Bullock died during an operation to amputate the leg. He is buried in Union Dale Cemetery on Pittsburgh's North Side.

== U.S. Patents ==
38,200 April 14, 1863 Printing press to use a continuous web or roll of paper, the first machine built especially for curved stereotype plates. It printed both sides of the sheet and cut it either before or after printings.

61,996 February 12, 1867 Improvement in Printing Presses, for discharging sheets. "... removing of sheets of printed paper from rotary presses and piling them rapidly."

100,367 March 1, 1870 (posthumous) Improvement in Rotary Paper-Cutting Machines. "... for cutting paper from a continuous roll into sheets"

100,368 March 1, 1870 (posthumous) Improved Machine for Planing and Squaring the ends of Segmental Stereotype Plates "... Improved Machine for Shaving and Squaring Circular Stereotype Plates"

171,093 Dec 14, 1875 (posthumous; Filing date June 20, 1866) Improvement in Machines for Damping Paper "... useful Machine for Dampening Paper"
