= 1867 in science =

The year 1867 in science and technology involved many significant events, listed below.

== Events ==
- April – First clear recorded use of the word science in English with today's usage as restricted to the natural and physical sciences (by Catholic theologian and mathematician W. G. Ward writing in the London-published Dublin Review).

== Astronomy ==
- Daniel Kirkwood publishes his observations of the Kirkwood Gaps in the asteroid belt.

== Botany ==
- August – The International Botanical Congress, meeting in Paris, adopts the first laws of botanical nomenclature, proposed by French-Swiss botanist Alphonse Pyramus de Candolle, based in part on the work of his father Augustin Pyramus de Candolle and the prototype of the International Code of Nomenclature for algae, fungi, and plants.
- Gorse naturalises in New Zealand and soon becomes the worst invasive weed.
- Swiss botanist Simon Schwendener proposes his dual theory of lichens.
- Rosa 'La France', the first hybrid tea rose, is cultivated by Jean-Baptiste Guillot.
- The Big Trees Ranch at Felton, California, is bought by San Francisco businessman Joseph Warren Welch to preserve the giant redwoods (Sequoia sempervirens) from logging.

== Chemistry ==
- Alfred Nobel patents dynamite (in the United Kingdom on May 7, and in Sweden on October 19).
- Henry Enfield Roscoe isolates vanadium.
- Charles-Adolphe Wurtz synthesizes neurine.

== Economics ==
- Publication of the first volume of Das Kapital by Karl Marx.

== Geology ==
- At Fountain Point, Michigan, an artesian water spring begins to gush continuously.
- Geological Exploration of the Fortieth Parallel established in the United States under the directorship of Clarence King.

== History of science ==
- Assyriologist George Smith discovers an inscription recording a solar eclipse in the month of Sivan on British Museum Tablet K51, which he is able to link to 15 June 763 BC, the cornerstone of ancient Near Eastern chronology.

== Mathematics ==
- English mathematician Rev. William Allen Whitworth publishes the first edition of his Choice and Chance: An Elementary Treatise on Permutations, Combinations, and Probability.

== Physiology and medicine ==
- March 16 – First publication of an article by Joseph Lister outlining the discovery of antiseptic surgery, in The Lancet.
- July 17 – In Boston, Massachusetts, the Harvard School of Dental Medicine is established as the first dental school in the United States.
- Lauder Brunton reports the successful use of amyl nitrite to treat angina, in The Lancet.
- Henry Maudsley publishes The Physiology and Pathology of Mind.
- Viennese psychiatrist Theodor Meynert observes variations in the cytoarchitecture of the brain.
- Yellow fever kills 3093 in New Orleans.

== Technology ==
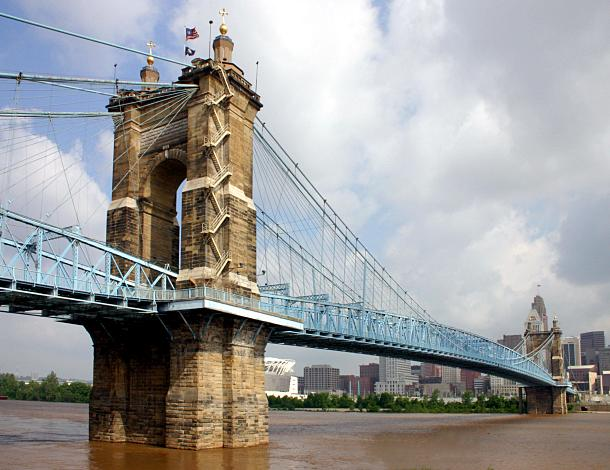
January 1: Roebling Suspension Bridge is longest.

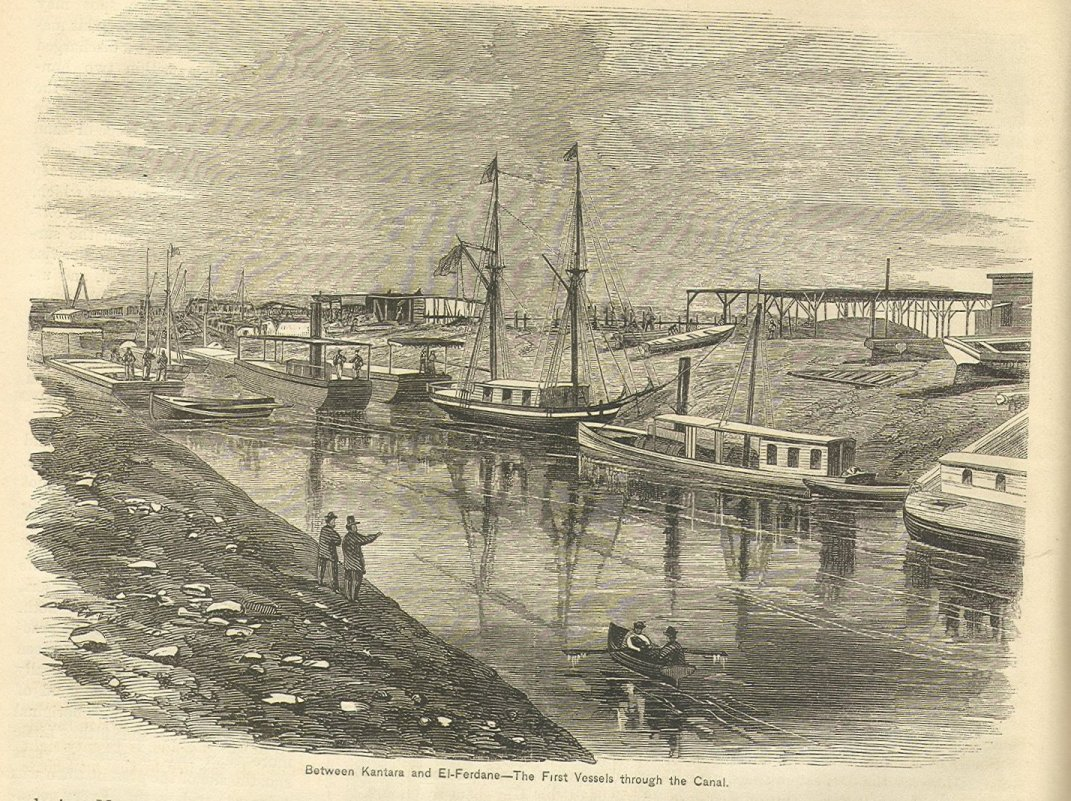
February 17: Suez Canal in use.

- January 1 – The Covington–Cincinnati Suspension Bridge opens between Cincinnati and Covington, Kentucky, its 1,057-foot (322 m) main span making it the longest single-span bridge in the world by a margin of 14 m at this time. It will be renamed after its designer, John A. Roebling, in 1983.
- February 17 – The first ship passes through the Suez Canal.
- July 2 – First elevated railroad in the United States begins service in New York City.
- December 14 – Spanish inventor Narcís Monturiol submerges his submarine Ictineo II at Barcelona, demonstrating its chemically fired anaerobic steam propulsion system.
- Pierre Michaux invents the front wheel-driven velocipede, the first mass-produced bicycle.

== Awards ==
- Copley Medal: Karl Ernst von Baer
- Wollaston Medal: George Poulett Scrope

== Births ==
- January 11 – Edward B. Titchener (died 1927), English-born structuralist psychologist.
- January 22 – Gisela Januszewska (died 1943 in Theresienstadt concentration camp), Moravian-born public health physician.
- April 16 – Wilbur Wright (died 1912), American pioneer aviator.
- May 5 – Kintarô Okamura (died 1935), Japanese phycologist.
- May 21 – Anne Walter Fearn (died 1939), American physician.
- June 11 – Charles Fabry (died 1945), French optical physicist.
- July 8 – Edgar Buckingham (died 1940), American physicist.
- October 21 – Aldred Scott Warthin (died 1931), American cancer geneticist.
- October 28 – Hans Driesch (died 1941), German developmental biologist.
- November 7 – Maria Skłodowska, later Marie Curie (died 1934), Polish-born physicist.
- November 26 – Emil von Dungern (died 1961), German serologist.
- December 1 – Ignacy Mościcki (died 1946), chemist and President of Poland.
- December 26 – John Bradfield (died 1943), Australian civil engineer.
- December 29 – Annie Montague Alexander (died 1950), American paleontologist.

== Deaths ==
- January 16 – William Marsden (born 1796), English surgeon.
- February 9 – Filippo de Filippi (born 1814), Italian zoologist.
- March 25 – Friedlieb Ferdinand Runge (born 1794), German analytical chemist.
- March 27 – Prideaux John Selby (born 1788), English ornithologist.
- April 12 – William Bullock (born 1813), American inventor.
- May 29 – Margaretta Morris (born 1797), American entomologist.
- August 25 – Michael Faraday (born 1791), English chemist and physicist.
- December 22 – Jean-Victor Poncelet (died 1788), French mechanical and military engineer and mathematician.
