= 1854 in science =

The year 1854 in science and technology involved some significant events, listed below.

== Astronomy ==
- July 22 – Discovery of the asteroid 30 Urania by John Russell Hind.
- October c. – George Airy calculates the mean density of the Earth by measuring the gravity in a coal mine in South Shields.

== Chemistry ==
- Benjamin Silliman of Yale University is the first person to fractionate petroleum into its individual components by distillation.

== Exploration ==
- January 4 – First definite sighting of McDonald Islands in the Antarctic.

== Mathematics ==
- March 26 – Playfair cipher first demonstrated, by Charles Wheatstone.
- George Boole's work on algebraic logic, An Investigation of the Laws of Thought on Which are Founded the Mathematical Theories of Logic and Probabilities, published in London.
- Arthur Cayley states the original version of Cayley's theorem and produces the first Cayley table.
- Bernhard Riemann, a German mathematician, submits his habilitation thesis Ueber die Darstellbarkeit einer Function durch eine trigonometrische Reihe ("About the representability of a function by a trigonometric series"), in which he describes the Riemann integral. It is published by Richard Dedekind in 1867.

== Medicine ==
- April–May – Dr John Snow traces the source of one outbreak of cholera in London (which kills 500) to a single water pump, validating his theory that cholera is water-borne, and forming the starting point for epidemiology.
- November – Florence Nightingale and her team of trained volunteer nurses arrive at Selimiye Barracks in Scutari in the Ottoman Empire to care for British Army troops invalided from the Crimean War.
- Spanish-born vocal pedagogist Manuel García observes his own functioning glottis using a form of laryngoscope incorporating mirrors.
- Claude Bernard introduces the term Milieu intérieur in physiology.

== Microbiology ==
- Filippo Pacini, an Italian anatomist, discovers Vibrio cholerae, the bacterium that causes cholera.
- Louis Pasteur begins studying fermentation at the request of brewers.

== Technology ==
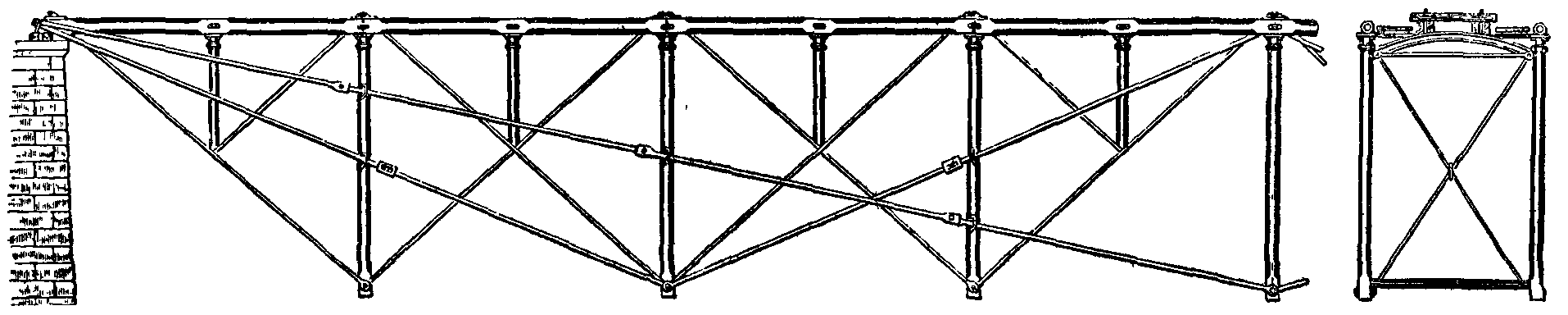
Fink truss

- May 9 – Albert Fink patents the Fink truss in the United States.
- May 17 – Deck of Wheeling Suspension Bridge in the United States destroyed through torsional movement and vertical undulations in a severe windstorm.
- June 13 – Anthony Faas patents improvements to the accordion in the United States.
- July – First voyage by a seagoing steamship fitted with a compound steam engine, the screw steamer Brandon, built on the River Clyde in Scotland by John Elder.
- September 19 – Thaddeus Hyatt patents a practical pavement light.
- November 27 – André-Adolphe-Eugène Disdéri patents a method of producing carte de visite photographs in France.
- December 20 – In the case of Talbot v. Laroche, pioneer of photography Henry Fox Talbot fails in asserting that the collodion process infringes his calotype patent.
- James Ambrose Cutting takes out three United States patents for improvements to the wet plate collodion process (Ambrotype photography).
- Elisha Otis completes work on the safety elevator.
- Joseph Whitworth patents polygonal rifling for ordnance in the United Kingdom.

== Events ==
- 10 June – The Crystal Palace reopens in Sydenham, South London with life-size dinosaur models in the grounds.

== Awards ==
- Copley Medal: Johannes Peter Müller
- Wollaston Medal for Geology: Richard John Griffith

== Births ==
- January 27 – George Alexander Gibson (died 1913), Scottish physician and geologist.
- January 29 – Fred Baker (died 1938), American physician and naturalist.
- February 9 – Aletta Jacobs (died 1929), Dutch physician and women's suffrage activist.
- March 4 – Napier Shaw (died 1945), English meteorologist.
- March 15 – Emil Adolf von Behring (died 1917), German physiologist, winner of the Nobel Prize in Physiology or Medicine in 1901.
- March 31 – Dugald Clerk (died 1932), Scottish mechanical engineer.
- April 28 – Phoebe Marks, later Hertha Ayrton (died 1923), English electrical engineer.
- April 29 – Henri Poincaré (died 1912), French mathematician.
- May 11 – Ottmar Mergenthaler (died 1899), German-born inventor.
- June 13 – Charles Algernon Parsons (died 1931), British inventor of the steam turbine.
- July 12 – George Eastman (suicide 1932), American photographic inventor.
- July 23 – Birt Acres (died 1918), American-born cinematographic inventor.
- July 28 – Victor Babeș (died 1926), Austrian-born Romanian physician and bacteriologist.
- October 3 – Hermann Struve (died 1920), Russian-born astronomer.

== Deaths ==
- January 16 – Charles Gaudichaud-Beaupré (born 1789), French botanist.
- April 15 – Arthur Aikin (born 1773), English chemist and mineralogist.
- July 6 – Georg Ohm (born 1789), German physicist.
- September 28 – George Field (born c.1777), English colour chemist.
- October 27 – Golding Bird (born 1814), English physician.
- November 18 – Edward Forbes (born 1815), Manx naturalist.
