= 1863 in science =

The year 1863 in science and technology involved some significant events, listed below.

== Chemistry ==
- August 1 – Friedrich Bayer founds the chemical manufacturing company of Bayer at Barmen in Germany.
- Teerfarbenfabrik Meister, Lucius & Co. of Höchst (Frankfurt) in Germany produce a green dye from coal tar.
- French chemist Angelo Mariani produces the first commercially successful coca wine.

== Cryptography ==
- German military officer Friedrich Kasiski publishes Die Geheimschriften und die Dechiffrir-Kunst ("Secret writing and the Art of Deciphering"), the first published general method for cryptanalysis of polyalphabetic ciphers, especially the Vigenère cipher.

== Life sciences ==
- August 7 – Amalie Dietrich arrives in Australia to begin a decade of collecting specimens in natural history and anthropology.
- Max Schultze advances cell theory with the observation that animal and vegetable protoplasm are identical.
- The first outbreak of phylloxera on the European mainland is observed, in the vineyards of the southern Rhône region of France.
- Henry Walter Bates publishes The Naturalist on the River Amazons.

== Medicine ==
- February 17 – First meeting of what will become the International Committee of the Red Cross is held in Geneva, Switzerland, following the lead of humanitarian Henry Dunant.
- William Banting publishes Letter on Corpulence, Addressed to the Public in London, the first popular low-carbohydrate diet.
- Ivan Sechenov publishes Refleksy golovnogo mozga ("Reflexes of the brain").
- Granula, the first manufactured breakfast cereal, is invented by nutrionist James Caleb Jackson in the United States.

== Meteorology ==
- The Paris Observatory begins to publish weather maps.

== Paleontology ==
- Richard Owen publishes the first description of a fossilised bird, Archaeopteryx, from the specimen in London's British Museum.

== Physics ==
- January – John Tyndall first explains the workings of the greenhouse effect.

== Technology ==
- February 10 – Alanson Crane patents a fire extinguisher.
- April 14 – William Bullock is granted a United States patent for improvements to the rotary printing press to use a continuous web or roll of paper to be printed on both sides, the first machine designed especially for curved stereotype plates.
- Spring – John Pratt builds a practical form of typewriter in the United States.
- July – The tiny Confederate States of America hand-propelled submarine H. L. Hunley is first tested successfully (although thirteen crew – including her inventor Horace Lawson Hunley – are lost in two sinkings later in the year).
- October 23 – The Ffestiniog Railway in North Wales introduces steam locomotives into general service, the first time this has been done anywhere in the world on a public railway of such a narrow gauge (2 ft (60 cm)).
- December 19 – Linoleum patented in the United Kingdom.
- John W. Murphy builds a Whipple-type truss bridge across the Lehigh River at Jim Thorpe, Pennsylvania for the Lehigh Valley Railroad in the United States, the first known to have both tension and compression members in wrought iron.

== Events and institutions ==
- March 3 – National Academy of Sciences incorporated in the United States.
- Summer – The Chōshū Five leave Japan secretly to study Western science and technology in Britain, at University College London, part of the ending of sakoku.
- November 29 – Polytechnic University of Milan founded as the Istituto Tecnico Superiore.

== Publications ==
- January 31 – The first of Jules Verne's scientifically inspired Voyages Extraordinaires, the novel Cinq semaines en ballon (Five Weeks in a Balloon), is published in Paris.

== Awards ==
- Copley Medal: Adam Sedgwick
- Wollaston Medal for Geology: Gustav Bischof

== Births ==
- March 25 – Simon Flexner (d. 1946), American pathologist and bacteriologist.
- April 7 – André Rochon-Duvigneaud (d. 1952), French ophthalmologist.
- April 29 – Signe Häggman (d. 1911), Finnish pioneer of physical education of the disabled.
- May 14 – John Charles Fields (d. 1932), Canadian mathematician.
- July 12
  - Albert Calmette (d. 1933), French physician, bacteriologist and immunologist.
  - Paul Drude (d. 1906), German physicist.
- October 16 – Beverly Thomas Galloway (d. 1938), American plant pathologist.
- November 25 – Ioan Cantacuzino (d. 1934), Romanian microbiologist.
- December 5 – Paul Painlevé (d. 19333), mathematician and statesman, 62nd Prime Minister of France.
- December 11 – Annie Jump Cannon (d. 1941), American astronomer and academic.
- Undated – Cuthbert Christy (d. 1932), English medical investigator, zoologist and explorer.

== Deaths ==
- March 7 – Charles Wilkins Short (b. 1794), American botanist.
- June 25 – Thomas Evans Blackwell (b. 1819), English civil and hydraulic engineer.
- July 21 – Josephine Kablick (b. 1787), Czech botanist and paleontologist.
- December 8 – Jacques Etienne Chevalley de Rivaz (b. 1801), Swiss-born physician
