= 1864 in science =

The year 1864 in science and technology included many events, some of which are listed here.

== Astronomy ==
- May 14 – The Orgueil meteorite, composed of carbonaceous chondrite, falls in southwestern France.
- August 29 – William Huggins is the first to take the spectrum of a planetary nebula when he analyzes NGC 6543.

== Botany ==
- English botanist Richard Spruce completes a 15-year expedition to the Andes and Amazon Basin during which he has collected more than 30,000 plant specimens.

== Chemistry ==
- August 20 – John Alexander Reina Newlands produces the first periodic table of the elements.
- November 27 – Barbituric acid is first synthesized, by German chemist Adolf von Baeyer.
- Lothar Meyer develops an early version of the periodic table, with 28 elements organized by valence.
- Cato Maximilian Guldberg and Peter Waage, building on Claude Louis Berthollet's ideas, propose the law of mass action.

== Conservation ==
- June 30 – The Yosemite Grant is created in the United States.

== Mathematics ==
- Alfred Enneper publishes his parametrization of the Enneper surface in connection with minimal surface theory.

== Physics ==
- December 8 – James Clerk Maxwell presents his paper A Dynamical Theory of the Electromagnetic Field to the Royal Society in London, treating light as an electromagnetic wave and presenting Maxwell's equations.

== Technology ==
- February 17 – In the American Civil War, the tiny Confederate hand-propelled submarine H. L. Hunley sinks the USS Housatonic using a spar torpedo in Charleston Harbor, becoming the first submarine to sink an enemy ship (although the submarine and her crew of eight are also lost).
- December 8 – The Clifton Suspension Bridge across the Bristol Avon in England, designed by Isambard Kingdom Brunel and completed as a memorial to him, opens to traffic.
- Oriel Chambers, Liverpool, England, the world's first metal-framed glass curtain walled building, designed by Peter Ellis (architect), is built.
- Nicolaus Otto and Eugen Langen produce a free piston gas atmospheric engine.
- Henry Roscoe and Robert Bunsen carry out what is reputed to be the first flashlight photography, using magnesium as a light source.
- Possible date – Siegfried Marcus builds the first motorized cart, in Vienna.

== Zoology ==
- The species Homo neanderthalensis is formally described by William King.
- The Central Park Zoo opens in New York City as a menagerie.

== Awards ==
- Copley Medal: Charles Darwin
- Wollaston Medal for Geology: Roderick Murchison

== Births ==
- January (prob. date) – George Washington Carver (died 1943), African American agricultural botanist.
- January 13 – Wilhelm Wien (died 1928), German physicist.
- February 28 – Oswald Bertram Lower (died 1925), Australian lepidopterist.
- March 12 – W. H. R. Rivers (died 1922), English psychiatrist.
- March 15 – Carl Edvard Johansson (died 1943), Swedish metrologist.
- April 21 – Max Weber (died 1920), German sociologist.
- June 14 – Alois Alzheimer (died 1915), German neuroscientist.
- June 25 – Walther Nernst (died 1941), German chemist.
- June 22 – Hermann Minkowski (died 1909), Lithuanian-German mathematician.
- September 8 (O.S. August 27) – Jakob Johann von Uexküll (died 1944), Baltic German pioneer of biosemiotics.
- December 1 – Carsten Borchgrevink (died 1934), Norwegian Antarctic explorer.

== Deaths ==
- January 14 – Father Nicholas Callan (born 1799), Irish physicist.
- March 21 – Luke Howard (born 1772), English meteorologist and manufacturing chemist.
- May 3 – William Lobb (born 1809), English plant collector.
- May 5 – Elizabeth Andrew Warren (born 1786), Cornish botanist and marine algolologist.
- May 29 – Johann Georg Bodmer (born 1786), Swiss mechanical engineer and inventor.
- November 23 – Friedrich Georg Wilhelm von Struve (born 1793), Baltic German-born astronomer.
- December 8 – George Boole (born 1815), English-born mathematician.
- December 12 – John Fowler (born 1826), English agricultural engineer.
