= 1857 in science =

The year 1857 in science and technology involved some significant events, listed below.

== Astronomy ==
- Peter Andreas Hansen's Tables of the Moon are published in London.

== Biology ==
- Rev. M. J. Berkeley publishes Introduction to Cryptogamic Botany.

== Chemistry ==
- Robert Bunsen invents apparatus for measuring effusion.
- August Kekulé proposes that carbon is tetravalent, or forms exactly four chemical bonds.
- Carl Wilhelm Siemens patents the Siemens cycle.

== Earth sciences ==
- January 9 – The 7.9 M_{w} Fort Tejon earthquake shakes Central and Southern California with a maximum Mercalli intensity of IX (Violent). The event, which involves slip on the southern segment of the San Andreas Fault, leaves two people dead.
- Friedrich Albert Fallou publishes Anfangsgründe der Bodenkunde [First Principles of Soil Science], laying the foundations for the modern study of soil science.

== Exploration ==
- May 16 – The British North American Exploring Expedition, led by Irish geographer Capt. John Palliser, sets off for a three-year exploration of Western Canada.
- Galen Clark becomes the first European American to see the Mariposa Grove of giant sequoias in California.

== History of science and technology ==
- The Stockton and Darlington Railway's Locomotion No. 1 of 1825 is set aside for preservation in England.

== Mathematics ==
- William Rowan Hamilton invents the Icosian game.

== Medicine ==
- March 12 – Elizabeth Blackwell opens the New York Infirmary for Indigent Women and Children.
- French surgeon Jean-Louis-Paul Denucé gives the first description of a neonatal incubator.
- French psychiatrist Bénédict Morel publishes Traité des dégénérescences physiques, intellectuelles et morales de l'espèce humaine et des causes qui produisent ces variétés maladives.

== Technology ==
- March 23 – Elisha Otis' first elevator is installed (at 488 Broadway (Manhattan)).
- The first rails made from steel are made by Robert Forester Mushet early in the year and laid experimentally at Derby railway station on the Midland Railway in England. They prove far more durable than the iron rails they replace and remain in use until 1873.

== Publications ==
- Naturalist P. H. Gosse's creationist text Omphalos: An Attempt to Untie the Geological Knot is published in England.

== Awards ==
- Copley Medal: Michel Eugène Chevreul
- Wollaston Medal for geology: Joachim Barrande

== Births ==
- January 20 – Vladimir Bekhterev (died 1927), Russian psychologist.
- February 3 – Wilhelm Johannsen (died 1927), Danish plant physiologist and geneticist.
- February 22 – Heinrich Hertz (died 1894), German physicist
- March 27 – Carl Pearson (died 1936), English mathematician.
- April 30 – Eugen Bleuler (died 1939), Swiss psychiatrist.
- May 13 – Ronald Ross (died 1932), Indian-born British physiologist, winner of the Nobel Prize in Physiology or Medicine 1902.
- May 15 – Williamina Fleming (died 1911), Scottish-born American astronomer.
- June 28 – Robert Jones (died 1933), Welsh orthopaedic surgeon.
- July 11 – Joseph Larmor (died 1942), Irish physicist.
- August 8 – Henry Fairfield Osborn (died 1935), American paleontologist.
- October 2 – John Macintyre (died 1928), Scottish laryngologist and pioneer radiographer.
- November 1 – John Joly (died 1933), Anglo-Irish physicist.
- November 27 – Charles Sherrington (died 1952), English neurophysiologist and bacteriologist, winner of the Nobel Prize in Physiology or Medicine 1932.
- November 29 – Theodor Escherich (died 1911), German-born pediatric bacteriologist.

== Deaths ==
- January 2 – Andrew Ure (born 1778), Scottish industrial chemist and encyclopaedist.
- May 23 – Augustin-Louis Cauchy (born 1789), French mathematician.
- June 21 – Louis Jacques Thénard (born 1777), French chemist.
- July 13 – Karl Wilhelm Gottlob Kastner (born 1783), German chemist.
- July 29 – Charles Lucien Bonaparte (born 1803), French naturalist.
- August 12 – William Conybeare (born 1787), English geologist.
- November 30 – Mary Buckland (born 1797), English paleontologist and marine biologist.
- December 15 – George Cayley (born 1773), English aviation pioneer.
- December 17 – Francis Beaufort (born 1774), British hydrographer.
- date unknown – Elizabeth Philpot (born 1780), English paleontologist.
