= 1851 in paleontology =

Paleontology or palaeontology is the study of prehistoric life forms on Earth through the examination of plant and animal fossils. This includes the study of body fossils, tracks (ichnites), burrows, cast-off parts, fossilised feces (coprolites), palynomorphs and chemical residues. Because humans have encountered fossils for millennia, paleontology has a long history both before and after becoming formalized as a science. This article records significant discoveries and events related to paleontology that occurred or were published in the year 1851.

== Archosauromorphs ==
=== Pterosaurs ===
- Two pterosaurs sculpted by Benjamin Waterhouse Hawkins were put on display in England's Crystal Palace. These were the first three-dimensional life-size restorations of pterosaurs.

=== Other archosauromorphs ===
==== New taxa ====
Name	Novelty	Status	Authors	Age	Unit	Location	Notes	Images
Clepsysaurus	Gen et sp nov	Nomen dubium	Lea	Late Triassic (Norian)	Passaic Formation	United States	Dubious genus phytosaur.	

== Plesiosaurs ==
=== Newly named plesiosaurs ===
Name	Status	Authors	Age	Unit	Location	Notes
Cimoliasaurus	Valid	Leidy	Late Cretaceous (Maastrichtian)	Navesink Formation	United States	An elasmosaurid.
Discosaurus	Valid	Leidy	Late Cretaceous		United States	A dubious elasmosaurid.
