= 1858 in science =

The year 1858 in science and technology involved some significant events, listed below.

== Astronomy ==
- June 2 – Donati's Comet, the first comet to be photographed, is discovered by Giovanni Battista Donati; it remains visible for several months afterwards.
- September 10 – George Mary Searle discovers the asteroid 55 Pandora from the Dudley Observatory near Albany, New York.

== Biology ==
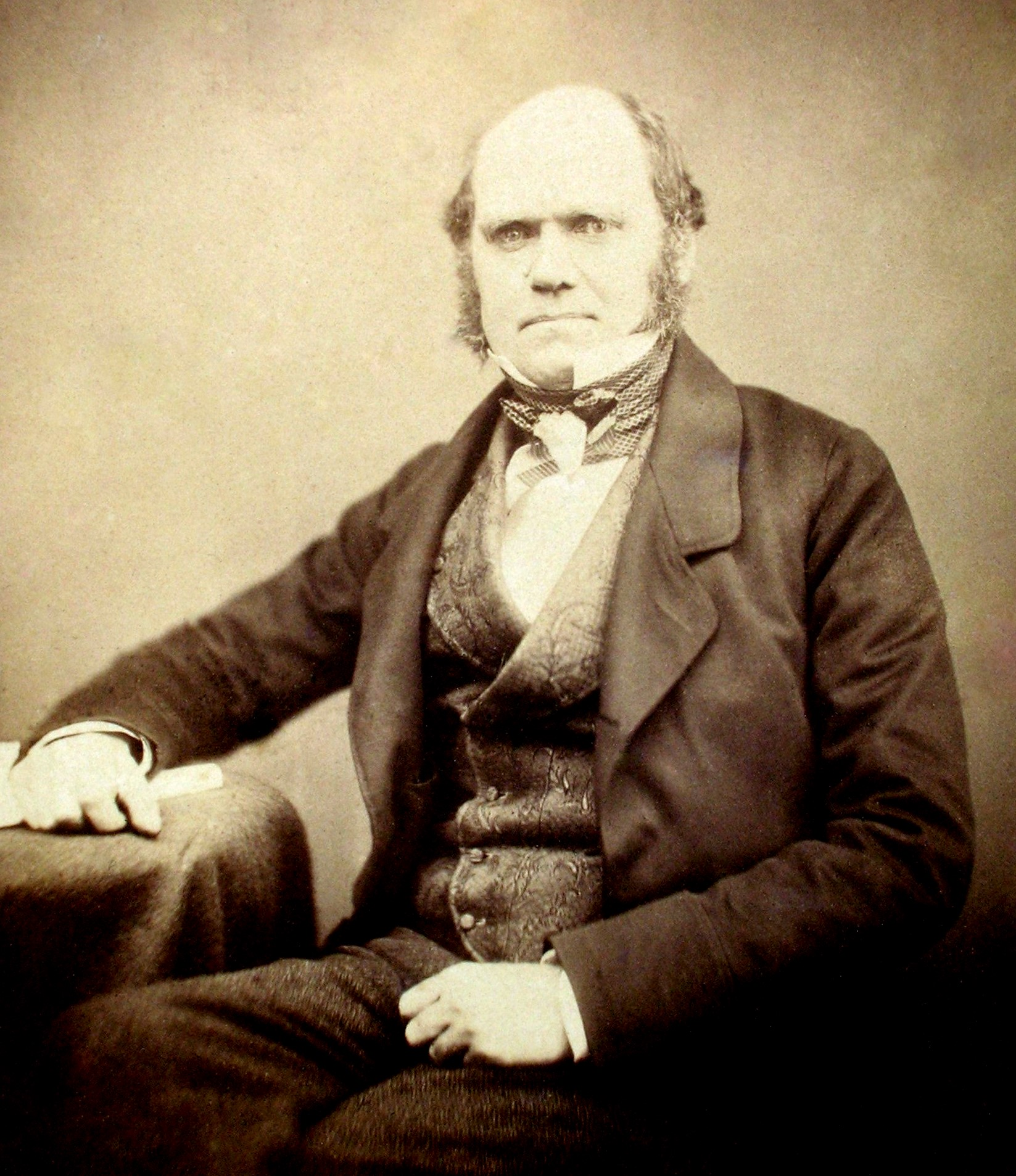
Darwin

- Publication of Darwin's theory of evolution:
  - June 18 – Charles Darwin receives papers from Alfred Russel Wallace setting out the latter's theory of natural selection which he forwards to Charles Lyell.
  - July 1 – Darwin and Wallace's papers on their theories of evolution, On the Tendency of Species to form Varieties; and on the Perpetuation of Varieties and Species by Natural Means of Selection (submitted with the support of Lyell and Joseph Dalton Hooker) are read by John Joseph Bennett to a meeting of the Linnean Society of London. They are first published on August 20.
- William Herschel initiates fingerprinting as a means of identification, in Bengal.
- Rudolf Virchow publishes Die Cellularpathologie in ihrer Begründung auf physiologische und pathologische Gewebelehre: 20 Vorlesungen, gehalten während der Monate Februar, März und April 1858 im Pathologischen Institut zu Berlin.
- George Bentham's Handbook of the British flora is published. This will be in use (in editions edited by Joseph Dalton Hooker) for a century.

== Chemistry ==
- May 28 – Erasmus Bond (owner of Pitt & Co. of London) patents tonic water, manufactured using quinine.

== Exploration ==
- February 13 – Richard Francis Burton and John Hanning Speke become the first Europeans to discover Lake Tanganyika.
- May 14 – Dr David Livingstone's 6-year Second Zambesi Expedition, under the patronage of the Royal Geographical Society, arrives at the African coast with the prefabricated iron paddle steamer Ma Robert.
- August 3 – John Hanning Speke discovers Lake Victoria, source of the River Nile.

== Mathematics ==
- The Möbius strip is discovered independently by German mathematicians August Ferdinand Möbius and Johann Benedict Listing.
- Arthur Cayley publishes "A memoir on the theory of matrices", introducing the modern concept of the matrix in mathematics.
- In Luxor, Egypt, the Rhind papyrus is found (named for Alexander Henry Rhind, the discoverer; it is sometimes called the Ahmes papyrus for the scribe who wrote it around 1650 BC).

== Physiology and medicine ==
- August 2 – Medical Act 1858 passed "to Regulate the Qualifications of Practitioners in Medicine and Surgery" in the United Kingdom.
- December 1 – The recently formed Odontological Society of London opens the Dental Hospital of London in England.
- First publication of Gray's Anatomy.
- Publication in London of Thomas B. Peacock's On Malformations, &c., of the Human Heart, with original cases which becomes a standard cardiology textbook.
- French pediatrician Eugène Bouchut develops a new technique for non-surgical orotracheal intubation to bypass laryngeal obstruction resulting from a diphtheria-related pseudomembrane.

== Psychiatry ==
- First treatise on postpartum psychiatric disturbances, by Louis-Victor Marcé, MD.

== Technology ==
- January 31 – I. K. Brunel's SS Great Eastern, the largest ship built to date, is launched on the River Thames using Tangye hydraulic rams.
- August – The first aerial photography is carried out by Nadar from a moored balloon in France using the collodion process.
- August 16 – Official inauguration of the transatlantic telegraph cable; however, it fails on September 1.
- Mirror galvanometer invented by William Thomson, 1st Baron Kelvin.
- Hoffmann kiln patented in Germany by Friedrich Hoffmann for continuous production brickmaking.

== Awards ==
- Copley Medal: Charles Lyell
- Wollaston Medal for geology: James Hall

== Births ==
- January 2 – Bernard Sachs (died 1944), American neurologist.
- January 9 – Elizabeth Gertrude Britton, née Knight (died 1934), American botanist.
- January 28 – Eugène Dubois (died 1940), Dutch paleoanthropologist.
- February 7 – Herman Frederik Carel ten Kate (died 1931), Dutch anthropologist.
- March 18 – Rudolf Diesel (died 1913), German mechanical engineer.
- March 27 – Richard Friedrich Johannes Pfeiffer (died 1945), German physician and bacteriologist.
- April 23 – Max Planck (died 1947), German theoretical physicist.
- May 19 – Thomas Allinson (died 1918), English physician and dietetic reformer.
- May 28 – T. H. E. C. Espin (died 1934), English astronomer, scientist and clergyman.
- July 9 – Franz Boas (died 1942), German-born anthropologist.
- August 11 – Christiaan Eijkman (died 1930), Dutch physiologist.
- August 19 – Ellen Willmott (died 1934), English horticulturist.
- August 27 – Giuseppe Peano (died 1932), Italian mathematician.
- October 4 – Mihajlo Idvorski Pupin (died 1935), Banat-born physicist.
- November 1 – Ludwig Struve (died 1920), Russian astronomer.
- November 30 – Jagadish Chandra Bose (died 1937), Bengali physicist.
- Laura Forster (died 1917), Australian physician.

== Deaths ==
- January 4 – Amelia Griffiths (born 1768), British phycologist.
- April 28 – Johannes Peter Müller (born 1801), German physiologist.
- June 10 – Robert Brown (born 1773), Scottish botanist.
- June 28 – Jane Marcet (born 1769), British popular science writer.
- November 8 – George Peacock (born 1791), English mathematician.
- December 10 – Joseph Paul Gaimard (born 1793), French naval surgeon and naturalist.
- December 16 – Richard Bright (born 1789), English physician.
