= 1860 in science =

The year 1860 in science and technology involved some significant events, listed below.

== Astronomy ==
- July 18 – Total solar eclipse. Warren De La Rue's photographs of this event, taken in Spain, together with those of Angelo Secchi, demonstrate the solar character of the prominences or red flames seen around the limb of the Moon during such an eclipse.

== Biology ==
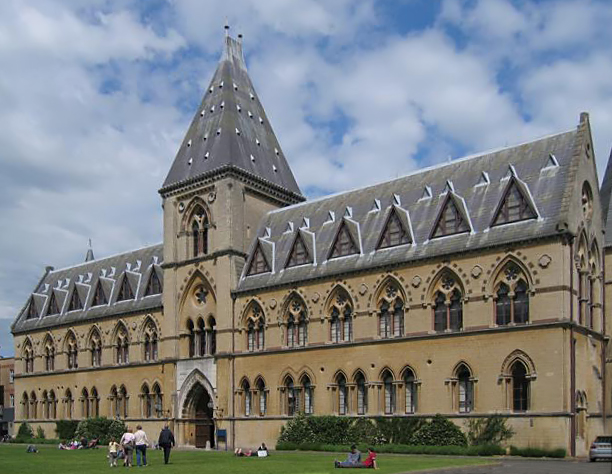
Oxford University Museum

- June 30 – Debate about evolution at the new Oxford University Museum of Natural History.
- John Curtis publishes Farm Insects, being the natural history and economy of the insects injurious to the field crops of Great Britain and Ireland... with suggestions for their destruction in Glasgow.

== Botany ==
- Joseph Dalton Hooker concludes publication of The Botany of the Antarctic Voyage of H.M. Discovery Ships Erebus and Terror ... 1839–1843 with issue of the final part of Flora Tasmaniae in London.

== Chemistry ==
- September 3–5 – Karlsruhe Congress, the first international meeting of chemists.
- Marcellin Berthelot rediscovers and names acetylene.
- Robert Bunsen and Gustav Kirchhoff, using their newly improved spectroscope, discover and name caesium in mineral water from Bad Dürkheim, Germany.
- Stanislao Cannizzaro, resurrecting Avogadro's ideas regarding diatomic molecules, compiles a table of atomic weights and presents it at the 1860 Karlsruhe Congress, ending decades of conflicting atomic weights and molecular formulas, and leading to Mendeleev's discovery of the periodic law.
- Albert Niemann makes a detailed analysis of the coca leaf, isolating and purifying the crystalline alkaloid which he calls cocaine.
- The Erlenmeyer flask is created by German chemist Emil Erlenmeyer.

== Mathematics ==
- Carl Wilhelm Borchardt first discovers and proves Cayley's formula in graph theory.

== Medicine ==
- July 9 – The Nightingale Training School and Home for Nurses, the first nursing school based on the ideas of Florence Nightingale, is opened at St Thomas' Hospital in London.

== Psychology ==
- Gustav Fechner publishes Elemente der Psychophysik, establishing the discipline of psychophysics and introducing the Weber–Fechner law on the intensity of stimuli.

== Technology ==
Au Clair de la Lune
This 1860 phonautogram by Leon Scott is the earliest known recorded sound.

- April 9 – Earliest known decipherable sound recording of the human voice, a phonautogram, produced by Édouard-Léon Scott de Martinville. Playback is impossible at this time.
- December 29 – Launch of HMS Warrior by the Thames Ironworks and Shipbuilding Company, the first all-iron warship, for the first time combining steam engines delivering high speed, rifled breech-loading guns, iron frames and armoured cladding, and the propeller, in the largest naval ship built to this date.
- Benjamin Tyler Henry patents the Henry rifle, a 16-shot .44 caliber rimfire breech-loading lever action tubular magazine model, predecessor of the Winchester.
- Edward Samuel Ritchie, considered to be the most innovative instrument maker in nineteenth-century America, receives a U.S. patent for the first successful and practicable liquid-filled marine compass suitable for general use.

== Awards ==
- Copley Medal: Robert Wilhelm Bunsen
- Wollaston Medal for geology: Searles Valentine Wood

== Births ==
- February 29 – Herman Hollerith (died 1929), American statistician, punched card data processing inventor.
- May 2
  - John Scott Haldane (died 1936), Scottish physiologist.
  - D'Arcy Wentworth Thompson (died 1948), Scottish biologist.
- May 25 – James McKeen Cattell (died 1944), American psychologist.
- June 8 – Alicia Boole Stott (died 1940) Anglo-Irish mathematician.
- December 31 – John T. Thompson (died 1940), American inventor.

== Deaths ==
- January 27 – János Bolyai (born 1802), Hungarian mathematician.
- January 27 – Thomas Brisbane (born 1773), British astronomer.
- April 1 – Joseph Guislain (born 1797), Belgian psychiatrist.
- June 29 – Thomas Addison (born 1793), English physician and scientist (suicide).
- July 1 – Charles Goodyear (born 1800), American inventor of the vulcanization process.
- December 3 – Joseph Marie Élisabeth Durocher (born 1817), French geologist.
