= 1854 in paleontology =

Paleontology or palaeontology is the study of prehistoric life forms on Earth through the examination of plant and animal fossils. This includes the study of body fossils, tracks (ichnites), burrows, cast-off parts, fossilised feces (coprolites), palynomorphs and chemical residues. Because humans have encountered fossils for millennia, paleontology has a long history both before and after becoming formalized as a science. This article records significant discoveries and events related to paleontology that occurred or were published in the year 1854.

== Vertebrate paleozoology ==
Non-mammalian synapsids described in 1854
Name	Status	Authors	Age	Unit	Location	Notes	Images
Bathygnathus	Valid	Joseph Leidy	Early Permian	Unnamed unit	Canada	A sphenacodontid pelycosaur.	

Nothosaurs described in 1854
Name	Status	Authors	Age	Location	Notes
Deirosaurus	Junior synonym	Owen	Late Triassic	Italy	Junior synonym of Lariosaurus.

Prehistoric dinosaurs described in 1854
Name	Status	Authors	Age	Unit	Location	Notes	Images
Leptospondylus	Junior synonym.	Sir Richard Owen	Early Jurassic (Hettangian-Sinemurian)	Upper Elliot Formation	South Africa	Junior subjective synonym of Massospondylus.	
Massospondylus	Valid	Sir Richard Owen	Early Jurassic (Hettangian-Sinemurian)	Upper Elliot Formation	Lesotho; South Africa; Zimbabwe	A massospondylid. a Small Plant-Eating Sauropodomorph.	Massospondylus
Nuthetes	Valid	Sir Richard Owen	Early Cretaceous (Berriasian)	Purbeck Group	England; France	A dromaeosaurid.	Nuthetes
Pachyspondylus	Junior synonym.	Sir Richard Owen	Early Jurassic (Hettangian-Sinemurian)	Upper Elliot Formation	South Africa	Junior subjective synonym of Massospondylus.	

== Literature ==
- The Fossil Spirit: A Boy's Dream of Geology by John Mill was published. The story features a fakir from Hindostan telling a group of boys about his past lives as prehistoric creatures across geologic time. One such life as was lived as an Iguanodon who was attacked by a Megalosaurus. Apart from this fight scene, paleontologist William A. S. Sarjeant has dismissed the book as a "singularly turgid and heavily didactic text."
