= 1866 in paleontology =

Paleontology or palaeontology is the study of prehistoric life forms on Earth through the examination of plant and animal fossils. This includes the study of body fossils, tracks (ichnites), burrows, cast-off parts, fossilised feces (coprolites), palynomorphs and chemical residues. Because humans have encountered fossils for millennia, paleontology has a long history both before and after becoming formalized as a science. This article records significant discoveries and events related to paleontology that occurred or were published in the year 1866.

== Dinosaurs ==
=== Newly named dinosaurs ===
Name	Status	Authors		Location	Notes
Calamospondylus	Nomen dubium	Fox	vide: Anonymous		
Euskelosaurus	Valid	Thomas Henry Huxley		Lesotho; South Africa; Zimbabwe	
Laelaps	Preoccupied.	Edward Drinker Cope			Preoccupied by Koch, 1836. Renamed Dryptosaurus.

== Synapsids ==
=== Non-mammalian ===
Name	Status	Authors	Age	Location	Notes	Images
Triglyphus	Valid	Fraas				
