= 1858 in paleontology =

Paleontology or palaeontology is the study of prehistoric life forms on Earth through the examination of plant and animal fossils. This includes the study of body fossils, tracks (ichnites), burrows, cast-off parts, fossilised feces (coprolites), palynomorphs and chemical residues. Because humans have encountered fossils for millennia, paleontology has a long history both before and after becoming formalized as a science. This article records significant discoveries and events related to paleontology that occurred or were published in the year 1858.

== Mammals ==
Name	Status	Authors	Age	Location	Notes	Images
Canis dirus	Valid taxon	Joseph Leidy	Pleistocene	Bolivia; Mexico; Peru; USA (Arizona, California, Florida, Idaho, Indiana, Kansas, Kentucky, Missouri, Nebraska, New Mexico, Oregon, Pennsylvania, South Carolina, South Dakota, Texas, Utah, Virginia, West Virginia, Wyoming); Venezuela	Commonly known as Dire Wolf.	Canis dirus
Zygomaturus	Valid taxon	Richard Owen	Pleistocene	Australia; New Caledonia; Papua New Guinea	A Rhino-like Marsupial.	Zygomaturus
