= 1810 in paleontology =

List of years in paleontology	(table)
- … 1800; 1801; 1802; 1803; 1804; 1805; 1806; 1807; 1808; 1809; 1810; 1811; 1812; 1813; 1814; 1815; 1816; 1817; 1818; 1819; 1820 …
- In science 1807 1808 1809 1810 1811 1812 1813
- Art; Archaeology; Architecture; Literature; Music; Philosophy; Science; +...

Paleontology or palaeontology is the study of prehistoric life forms on Earth through the examination of plant and animal fossils. This includes the study of body fossils, tracks (ichnites), burrows, cast-off parts, fossilised feces (coprolites), palynomorphs and chemical residues. Because humans have encountered fossils for millennia, paleontology has a long history both before and after becoming formalized as a science. This article records significant discoveries and events related to paleontology that occurred or were published in the year 1810.

== Reptiles ==
- In contrast to Cuvier and Blumenbach, Samuel Thomas von Soemmering interpreted Collini's 1784 fossil as a mammal. Specifically, he interpreted it as an unusual bat, which morphologically linked mammals with birds. He named this strange creature Ornithocephalus in his public lecture, which was published in 1812. Soemmering may have interpreted this series of forms in an evolutionary sense, following the early evolutionary ideas of Jean-Baptiste de Lamarck. Soemmering's analysis of the specimen was blemished by anatomical errors, like the misidentifications of bones. Soemmering agreed with Cuvier (who named it Pterodactylus) that the creature was a flying insectivore, however. Soemmering argued that pterosaurs walked on all fours like bats when on the ground. His advocacy for this interpretation of pterosaur terrestrial gait has been regarded as the beginning of a multi-century debate on the subject.
