= 1808 in paleontology =

List of years in paleontology	(table)
- … 1798; 1799; 1800; 1801; 1802; 1803; 1804; 1805; 1806; 1807; 1808; 1809; 1810; 1811; 1812; 1813; 1814; 1815; 1816; 1817; 1818 …
- In science 1805 1806 1807 1808 1809 1810 1811
- Art; Archaeology; Architecture; Literature; Music; Philosophy; Science; +...

Paleontology or palaeontology is the study of prehistoric life forms on Earth through the examination of plant and animal fossils. This includes the study of body fossils, tracks (ichnites), burrows, cast-off parts, fossilised feces (coprolites), palynomorphs and chemical residues. Because humans have encountered fossils for millennia, paleontology has a long history both before and after becoming formalized as a science. This article records significant discoveries and events related to paleontology that occurred or were published in the year 1808.

== Reptiles ==
- The famed Georges Cuvier publishes illustrations of vertebrae discovered near Honfleur. He mistakenly describes them as crocodilian, although later researchers have concluded that these remains almost certainly belonged to a theropod dinosaur.
