= 1806 in paleontology =

| List of years in paleontology | (table) |
- … 1796; 1797; 1798; 1799; 1800; 1801; 1802; 1803; 1804; 1805; 1806; 1807; 1808; 1809; 1810; 1811; 1812; 1813; 1814; 1815; 1816 …
- In science 1803 1804 1805 1806 1807 1808 1809
- Art; Archaeology; Architecture; Literature; Music; Philosophy; Science; +...

Paleontology or palaeontology is the study of prehistoric life forms on Earth through the examination of plant and animal fossils. This includes the study of body fossils, tracks (ichnites), burrows, cast-off parts, fossilised feces (coprolites), palynomorphs and chemical residues. Because humans have encountered fossils for millennia, paleontology has a long history both before and after becoming formalized as a science. This article records significant discoveries and events related to paleontology that occurred or were published in the year 1806.

== Reptiles ==
- William Clark notices an exposed fossil rib in an area later known as the Hell Creek Formation on the south bank of the Yellowstone River. Although he mistakenly believed the rib belonged to a huge fish, paleontologists have determined that this event marks the first documented dinosaur fossil discovery in North America.
