= 1804 in paleontology =

List of years in paleontology	(table)
- … 1794; 1795; 1796; 1797; 1798; 1799; 1800; 1801; 1802; 1803; 1804; 1805; 1806; 1807; 1808; 1809; 1810; 1811; 1812; 1813; 1814 …
- In science 1801 1802 1803 1804 1805 1806 1807
- Art; Archaeology; Architecture; Literature; Music; Philosophy; Science; +...

Paleontology or palaeontology is the study of prehistoric life forms on Earth through the examination of plant and animal fossils. This includes the study of body fossils, tracks (ichnites), burrows, cast-off parts, fossilised feces (coprolites), palynomorphs and chemical residues. Because humans have encountered fossils for millennia, paleontology has a long history both before and after becoming formalized as a science. This article records significant discoveries and events related to paleontology that occurred or were published in the year 1804.

== Mammals ==
- Georges Cuvier describes fossil from the Paris Basin. He determines that two particular taxa based on their fossils were similar to modern mammals such as tapirs, camels, or ruminants but otherwise were not close analogues. He names the perissodactyl Palaeotherium ("old beast") and the artiodactyl Anoplotherium ("unarmed beast").

=== New taxa ===
Taxon	Novelty	Status	Author(s)	Age	Unit	Location	Notes	Images
Palaeotherium	Gen. nov.	Valid	Cuvier	Late Eocene	Paris Basin	France	Genus of equoid of the Palaeotheriidae, previously considered to be closely related to and resembling tapirs.	
Anoplotherium	Gen. nov.	Valid	Cuvier	Late Eocene	Paris Basin	France	Genus of artiodactyl belonging to the Anoplotheriidae, endemic to western Europe.	
