= 1807 in paleontology =

List of years in paleontology	(table)
- … 1797; 1798; 1799; 1800; 1801; 1802; 1803; 1804; 1805; 1806; 1807; 1808; 1809; 1810; 1811; 1812; 1813; 1814; 1815; 1816; 1817 …
- In science 1804 1805 1806 1807 1808 1809 1810
- Art; Archaeology; Architecture; Literature; Music; Philosophy; Science; +...

Paleontology or palaeontology is the study of prehistoric life forms on Earth through the examination of plant and animal fossils. This includes the study of body fossils, tracks (ichnites), burrows, cast-off parts, fossilised feces (coprolites), palynomorphs and chemical residues. Because humans have encountered fossils for millennia, paleontology has a long history both before and after becoming formalized as a science. This article records significant discoveries and events related to paleontology that occurred or were published in the year 1807.

== Reptiles ==
- German anatomist Johann Friedrich Blumenbach interpreted Collini's 1784 animal as a bird, specifically, as some kind of waterfowl. This fossil would be named Pterodactylus in 1809.
