= 1797 in science =

List of years in science	(table)
- … 1787; 1788; 1789; 1790; 1791; 1792; 1793; 1794; 1795; 1796; 1797; 1798; 1799; 1800; 1801; 1802; 1803; 1804; 1805; 1806; 1807 …
- Art; Archaeology; Architecture; Literature; Music; Philosophy; Science; +...

The year 1797 in science and technology involved some significant events.

== Chemistry ==
- Smithson Tennant demonstrates that diamond is a pure form of carbon.
- Louis Nicolas Vauquelin discovers chromium.
- Joseph Proust proposes the law of definite proportions, which states that elements always combine in small, whole number ratios to form compounds.

== Mathematics ==
- Lagrange publishes his Théorie des fonctions analytiques.

== Physics ==
- Giovanni Battista Venturi describes the Venturi effect.

== Technology ==
- October 22 – André-Jacques Garnerin carries out the first descent using a frameless parachute, a 980 m (3,200 feet) drop from a balloon in Paris.
- English naval engineer Samuel Bentham applies for patents covering several machines to produce wood veneers; in his patent applications, he describes the concept of laminating several layers of veneer with glue to form a thicker piece – the first description of what in modern times becomes known as plywood.

== Zoology ==
- Thomas Bewick publishes the first volume, Land Birds, of his History of British Birds.

== Awards ==
- Copley Medal: Not awarded

== Births ==
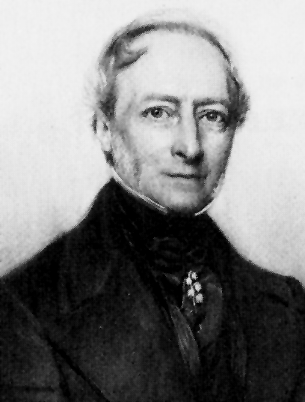
Frederick William Hope

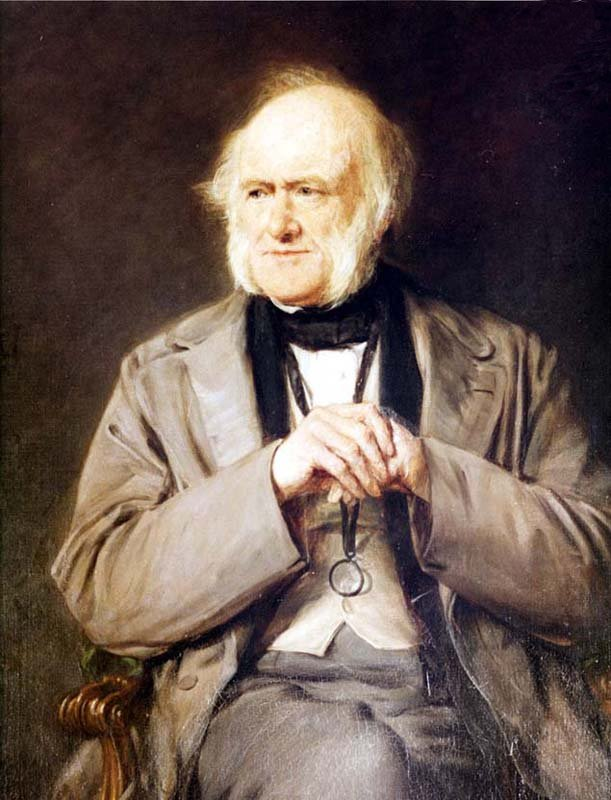
Charles Lyell

- January 3 – Frederick William Hope, British zoologist (died 1862)
- January 4 – Wilhelm Beer, Prussian astronomer (died 1850)
- February – Joseph-Alphonse Adhémar, French mathematician (died 1862)
- February 2 – Joseph Guislain, Flemish psychiatrist (died 1860)
- February 5 – Jean-Marie Duhamel, French mathematician and physicist (died 1872)
- March 10 – George Poulett Scrope, British geologist and economist (died 1876)
- March 21 – Johann Andreas Wagner, German paleontologist, zoologist and archeologist (died 1861)
- April 29 – George Don, Scottish botanist (died 1856)
- May 2 – Abraham Gesner, Canadian inventor of kerosene (died 1864)
- May 30 – Karl Friedrich Naumann, German geologist and mineralogist (died 1873)
- July 14 – James Scott Bowerbank, British naturalist, geologist and paleontologist (died 1877)
- July 26 – William Hutton, British geologist and paleontologist (died 1860)
- August 23 – Adhémar Jean Claude Barré de Saint-Venant, French mechanician and mathematician (died 1886)
- August 31 – James Ferguson, Scottish-born American astronomer (died 1867)
- September 1 – Augustin-Pierre Dubrunfaut, French chemist (died 1881)
- September 10 – Carl Gustaf Mosander, Swedish chemist (died 1858)
- September 17 – Heinrich Kuhl, German zoologist (died 1821)
- October 4 – Félix Savary, French astronomer (died 1841)
- October 5 – John Gardner Wilkinson, British egyptologist (died 1875)
- November 14 – Charles Lyell, Scottish geologist (died 1875)
- November 20 - Mary Buckland, British paleontologist and marine biologist (died 1857)
- December 3
  - Margaretta Morris, American entomologist (died 1867)
  - Andrew Smith, Scottish military surgeon, explorer, ethnologist and zoologist (died 1872)
- December 17 – Joseph Henry, American scientist (died 1878)
- December 23 – Adrien-Henri de Jussieu, French botanist (died 1853)

== Deaths ==
- March 16 – Cristina Roccati, Italian scholar in physics (born 1732)
- March 26 – James Hutton, Scottish geologist (born 1726)
- June 13 – Samuel-Auguste Tissot, Swiss physician (born 1728)
- August 29 – Joseph Wright, English painter of scientific subjects (born 1734)
- date unknown – Wang Zhenyi, Chinese Qing dynasty female astronomer and poet (born 1768)
