= 1798 in science =

| List of years in science | (table) |
- … 1788; 1789; 1790; 1791; 1792; 1793; 1794; 1795; 1796; 1797; 1798; 1799; 1800; 1801; 1802; 1803; 1804; 1805; 1806; 1807; 1808 …
- Art; Archaeology; Architecture; Literature; Music; Philosophy; Science; +...

The year 1798 in science and technology involved some significant events.

== Astronomy ==
- Caroline Herschel's index and updating of Flamsteed's star catalogue is published by the Royal Society of London.

== Chemistry ==
- The element beryllium is discovered by Louis Vauquelin as the oxide in beryl and in emeralds. Friedrich Wöhler and A. A. Bussy independently isolate the metal in 1828 by reacting potassium and beryllium chloride.

== Demography ==
- Thomas Robert Malthus publishes the first edition of An Essay on the Principle of Population (anonymously) in London.

== Mathematics ==
- Lagrange publishes his Résolution des équations numériques, including the method of approximating to the real roots of an equation by means of continued fractions.
- Carl Friedrich Gauss (born 1777) completes his magnum opus, Disquisitiones Arithmeticae (published 1801).

== Medicine ==
- Edward Jenner publishes An Inquiry into the Causes and Effects of the Variolæ Vaccinæ, a disease discovered in some of the western counties of England, particularly Gloucestershire, and known by the name of the Cow Pox, describing the smallpox vaccine, in London.
- Charles Bell publishes A System of Dissection Explaining the Anatomy of the Human Body in collaboration with his brother John.
- Alexander Crichton publishes An inquiry into the nature and origin of mental derangement; comprehending a concise system of the physiology and pathology of the human mind and a history of the passions and their effects, including a description of a condition resembling the inattentive subtype of attention deficit hyperactivity disorder.
- John Dalton publishes "Extraordinary Facts Relating to the Vision of Colours", describing colour blindness for the first time in print.
- Philippe Pinel publishes Nosographie philosophique, ou méthode de l'analyse appliquée à la médecine, emphasising the importance of nosology (classification of diseases) to medicine. It goes through six editions in the next ten years.
- Samuel Thomas von Sömmerring publishes Tabula sceleti feminini in Frankfurt am Main, the first accurate representation of the female skeleton.

== Physics ==
- Benjamin Thompson, Count Rumford, publishes An Inquiry Concerning the Source of the Heat Which Is Excited by Friction.

== Technology ==
- James Sadler introduces the table engine at the Portsmouth Block Mills in England.

== Zoology ==
- The platypus is first discovered by Europeans.

== Publications ==
- The Philosophical Magazine is initiated by Alexander Tilloch to cover the field of natural philosophy; it will still be published more than two centuries later.

== Awards ==
- Copley Medal: Sir George Shuckburgh-Evelyn, 6th Baronet; Charles Hatchett

== Births ==
- March 25 – Christoph Gudermann, German mathematician (died 1852)
- April 3 – Charles Wilkes, American navigator (died 1877)
- July 14 - François Mêlier, French physician (died 1866)
- August 17 – Thomas Hodgkin, English physician (died 1866)
- September 11 – Franz Ernst Neumann, German mineralogist, physicist and mathematician (died 1895)
- September 19 – Caesar Hawkins, English surgeon (died 1884)
- November 4 – Karl Kreil, Austrian astronomer (died 1862)
- December 28 – Thomas Henderson, Scottish astronomer (died 1844)

== Deaths ==
- May 10 – George Vancouver, English explorer (born 1757)
- May 2 – Erland Samuel Bring, Swedish mathematician (born 1736)
- August 25 – Mikiel'Ang Grima, Maltese surgeon (born 1729)
- November 5 – John Zephaniah Holwell, Anglo-Irish surgeon (born 1711)
- December 4 – Luigi Galvani, Italian physicist (born 1737)
- December 16 – Thomas Pennant, Welsh naturalist (born 1726)
