= 1809 in science =

List of years in science	(table)
- … 1799; 1800; 1801; 1802; 1803; 1804; 1805; 1806; 1807; 1808; 1809; 1810; 1811; 1812; 1813; 1814; 1815; 1816; 1817; 1818; 1819 …
- Art; Archaeology; Architecture; Literature; Music; Philosophy; Science; +...

The year 1809 in science and technology involved some significant events, listed below.

== Astronomy ==
- Carl Friedrich Gauss publishes Theoria motus corporum coelestium in sectionibus conicis solem ambientum in Hamburg, introducing the Gaussian gravitational constant and containing an influential treatment of the least squares method.
- S. D. Poisson publishes Sur les inégalités séculaires des moyens mouvements des planètes and Sur la variation des constantes arbitraires dans les questions de mécanique in the Journal of the École Polytechnique, extending Lagrange's theory of planetary orbits.

== Biology ==
- Jean-Baptiste Lamarck publishes Philosophie Zoologique, outlining his theory of evolution.
- Johann Heinrich Friedrich Link first describes Penicillium.

== Geology ==
- William Maclure publishes the first geological map of the United States with accompanying memoir.

== Mathematics ==
- Louis Poinsot describes the two remaining Kepler-Poinsot polyhedra.

== Medicine ==
- December 25 – American physician Ephraim McDowell performs the world's first ovariotomy, the removal of an ovarian tumor.
- Philippe Pinel publishes accounts of what would later be regarded as schizophrenia.

== Technology ==
- February 11 – Robert Fulton patents the steamboat in the United States.
- May 5 – Mary Kies becomes one of the first women granted a U.S. patent, for a technique of weaving straw hats with silk and thread.
- Samuel Thomas von Sömmerring invents a water voltameter electrical telegraph.
- William Hyde Wollaston invents the reflecting goniometer.

== Awards ==
- Copley Medal: Edward Troughton

== Births ==
- January 4 – Louis Braille (died 1852), French inventor.
- January 6 – Marie Durocher (died 1893), Brazilian physician.
- February 12 – Charles Darwin (died 1882), English naturalist.
- February 15 – Cyrus McCormick (died 1884), American inventor.
- February 21 – Carl Ernst Bock (died 1874), German physician and anatomist.
- April 7 – James Glaisher (died 1903), English meteorologist and balloonist.
- April 15 – Hermann Grassmann (died 1877), German mathematician.
- April 20 – James David Forbes (died 1868), Scottish physicist, glaciologist and seismologist.
- August 29 – Oliver Wendell Holmes Sr. (died 1894), American physician and writer.
- November 22 – Bénédict Morel (died 1873), French psychiatrist.
- Date unknown – William Lobb (died 1864), English plant collector.

== Deaths ==
- May 17 – Leopold Auenbrugger (born 1722), Austrian physician.
- August 18 – Matthew Boulton (born 1728), English mechanical engineer.
- October 11 – Meriwether Lewis (born 1774), American explorer.
- December 16 – Antoine François, comte de Fourcroy (born 1755), French chemist.
- December 29 – Thomas Barker (born 1722), English meteorologist.
