= 1870 in science =

| List of years in science | (table) |
- … 1860; 1861; 1862; 1863; 1864; 1865; 1866; 1867; 1868; 1869; 1870; 1871; 1872; 1873; 1874; 1875; 1876; 1877; 1878; 1879; 1880 …
- Art; Archaeology; Architecture; Literature; Music; Philosophy; Science; +...

The year 1870 in science and technology involved some significant events, listed below.

== Biology ==
- January 18 – Gerhardt Krefft first describes the Queensland lungfish, in The Sydney Morning Herald.
- Charles Valentine Riley confirms Phylloxera as the cause of the Great French Wine Blight.
- Heinrich Wilhelm Gottfried von Waldeyer-Hartz postulates that the number of ova in the female is fixed.

== Chemistry ==
- Norman Lockyer and Edward Frankland propose that the gas detected in solar observations should be called 'helium'.

== Mathematics ==
- Felix Klein constructs a model for hyperbolic geometry establishing its self-consistency and the logical independence of Euclid's fifth postulate. (Note: Eugenio Beltrami had previously given such a model in 1868.)
- W. Stanley Jevons publishes the popular textbook Elementary Lessons on Logic.

== Medicine ==
- Louis Pasteur and Robert Koch establish the germ theory of disease.
- Henry Maudsley publishes his lectures on Body and Mind: an Inquiry into their Connection and Mutual Influence.
- Frances Morgan becomes the first British woman to receive a Doctor of Medicine degree from a European university, the University of Zurich.

== Meteorology ==
- November 1 – In the United States, the newly created Weather Bureau (later renamed the National Weather Service) makes its first official meteorological forecast: "High winds at Chicago and Milwaukee... and along the Lakes".

== Paleontology ==
- Eustreptospondylus oxoniensis juvenile dinosaur fossil found in Summertown, Oxford.

== Physics ==
- Rudolf Clausius proves the scalar virial theorem.

== Psychology ==
- Ludimar Hermann observes the Hermann grid illusion.

== Technology ==
- February 26 – The Beach Pneumatic Transit subway in New York City is opened.
- March 8 – Joy valve gear for steam locomotives is patented in the United Kingdom by David Joy.
- August 2 – Official opening of the Tower Subway beneath the River Thames in London, first use of the cylindrical wrought iron tunnelling shield devised by Peter W. Barlow and James Henry Greathead and of a permanent tunnel lining of cast iron segments.
- Svend Foyn receives a Norwegian patent for the grenade harpoon cannon for whaling.
- Henry R. Heyl receives a United States patent for a magic lantern movie projector.
- A practical stock ticker is introduced by Thomas Edison.
- First known use of weapons for anti-aircraft warfare, at Paris during the Franco-Prussian War.

== Institutions ==
- Ellen Swallow Richards becomes the first woman admitted to study at the Massachusetts Institute of Technology.
- December 20 – Missouri University of Science and Technology established as the Missouri School of Mines and Metallurgy.

== Awards ==
- Copley Medal: James Prescott Joule
- Wollaston Medal for geology: Gerard Paul Deshayes

== Births ==
- January 9 – Joseph Strauss (died 1938), American bridge engineer.
- January 13 – Ross Granville Harrison (died 1959), American physiologist.
- February 7 – Alfred Adler (died 1937), Austrian psychotherapist.
- March 17 – Horace Donisthorpe (died 1951), English entomologist.
- May 20 – Arthur Korn (died 1945), German inventor.
- May 27 – Anna Stecksén (died 1904), Swedish scientist, physician and pathologist.
- June 21 – Clara Immerwahr (suicide 1915), German chemist.
- August 25 – Mihran Kassabian (died 1910), American radiologist.
- October 23 – George Newman (died 1948), English public health physician.

== Deaths ==
- January 25 – Janet Taylor (born 1804), English mathematician and navigational instrument maker.
- March 9 – 'Granny' Maria Ann Smith (born 1799), English-born Australian horticulturalist.
- March 12 – Charles Xavier Thomas (born 1785), French inventor of the first mass-produced calculator.
- July 12 – Alexander Henry Haliday (born 1806), Anglo Irish entomologist.
- November 14 – Karl Weltzien (born 1813), German inorganic chemist.
- December 27 (O.S. December 15) – Nikolai N. Kaufman (born 1834), Russian botanist.
