= 1804 in science =

List of years in science	(table)
- … 1794; 1795; 1796; 1797; 1798; 1799; 1800; 1801; 1802; 1803; 1804; 1805; 1806; 1807; 1808; 1809; 1810; 1811; 1812; 1813; 1814 …
- Art; Archaeology; Architecture; Literature; Music; Philosophy; Science; +...

The year 1804 in science and technology involved some significant events, listed below.

== Astronomy and space science ==
- April 5 – High Possil meteorite, the first recorded meteorite to fall in Scotland in modern times, falls at Possil.
- September 1 – Karl Ludwig Harding discovers the asteroid Juno.

== Botany ==
- March 7 – John Wedgwood founds the Horticultural Society of London.
- Jacques-Julien Labillardière begins publication of Novæ Hollandiæ Plantarum Specimen in Paris, the first flora of Australia.
- Publication in Paris of Nicolas-Théodore de Saussure's collected papers Recherches chimiques sur la végétation, outlining the basic reaction of photosynthesis.
- Publication in London of Maria Elizabetha Jacson's Botanical Lectures by a Lady.

== Chemistry ==
- June 21 – Smithson Tennant announces the discovery of the elements iridium and osmium; three days later, William Hyde Wollaston reveals to the Royal Society that he is the formerly anonymous discoverer of palladium.
- German pharmacist Friedrich Sertürner first isolates morphine from opium, probably the first ever isolation of a natural plant alkaloid.

== Exploration ==
- May 14 – The Lewis and Clark Expedition departs from Camp Dubois and begin their historic journey by traveling up the Missouri River.

== Geology ==
- Alexander von Humboldt discovers that the Earth's magnetic field decreases from the poles to the equator.

== Medicine ==
- October 13 – In Japan, Hanaoka Seishū (華岡 青洲) performs a partial mastectomy for breast cancer on a 60-year-old woman named Kan Aiya, using tsūsensan as a general anesthetic, generally regarded as the first reliably documented operation performed under general anesthesia.
- Publication of The Anatomy of the Human Body, vol. 3, Nervous System by Charles Bell.
- English physician Joseph Mason Cox publishes Practical Observations on Insanity; in which some suggestions are offered towards and improved mode of treating diseases of the mind, and some rules proposed which it is hoped may lead to a more humane and successful method of cure.
- Antonio Scarpa publishes Riflessioni ed Osservazione anatomico-chirugiche sull' Aneurisma, a classic text on aneurysms.

== Meteorology ==
- Joseph Louis Gay-Lussac and Jean Baptiste Biot study the atmosphere from a hot-air balloon.

== Paleontology ==
- James Parkinson publishes the first volume of Organic Remains of a Former World, supporting belief in catastrophism.

== Technology ==
- February 21 – The Cornishman Richard Trevithick's newly built "Penydarren" steam locomotive operates on the Merthyr Tramroad between Penydarren Ironworks in Merthyr Tydfil and Abercynon in South Wales, following several trials since February 13, the world's first locomotive to work on rails.
- The first Burr Truss bridge is built by Theodore Burr across the Hudson River in Waterford, New York.
- Joseph Marie Jacquard patents the Jacquard machine to automate the loom.
- William Congreve begins development of the solid-fuel Congreve rocket as an artillery weapon.
- The British Army first uses shrapnel shells ("spherical case shot"), invented by Major Henry Shrapnel, in action, against the Dutch in Suriname.

== Awards ==
- Copley Medal: Smithson Tennant

== Births ==
- February 12 – Heinrich Lenz, Russian-born Baltic German physicist (died 1865)
- February 18 – Baron Carl von Rokitansky, Bohemian pathologist (died 1878)
- March 8 – Alvan Clark, American telescope manufacturer (died 1887)
- April 5
  - Mary Philadelphia Merrifield, née Watkins, English fashion writer and algologist (died 1889)
  - Matthias Schleiden, German botanist (died 1881)
- May 4 – Margaretta Riley, English pteridologist (died 1899)
- May 9 – Hewett Watson, English biologist (died 1881)
- May 13 – Janet Taylor, née Jane Ann Ionn, English mathematician and navigational instrument maker (died 1870)
- June 5 – Robert Schomburgk, German-born explorer (died 1865)
- July 20 – Richard Owen, English anatomist and paleontologist (died 1892)
- September 14 – John Gould, English ornithologist (died 1881)
- September 16 – Squire Whipple, American civil engineer (died 1888)
- October 1 – William Stokes, Irish physician (died 1878)
- October 24 – Wilhelm Eduard Weber, German physicist (died 1891)
- December 10 – Carl Gustav Jacob Jacobi, German mathematician (died 1851)
- December 24 – Édouard Chassaignac, French surgeon (died 1879)

== Deaths ==
- February 6 – Joseph Priestley, English chemist (born 1733)
- March 26 – Wolfgang von Kempelen, Hungarian inventor (born 1734)
- August 30 – Thomas Percival, English reforming physician and medical ethicist (born 1740)
- September 20 – Pierre Méchain, French astronomer (born 1744)
- October 2 – Nicolas-Joseph Cugnot, French mechanical engineer (born 1725)
- November 5 – Louis Lépecq de La Clôture, French epidemiologist (born 1736)
