= 1807 in science =

List of years in science	(table)
- … 1797; 1798; 1799; 1800; 1801; 1802; 1803; 1804; 1805; 1806; 1807; 1808; 1809; 1810; 1811; 1812; 1813; 1814; 1815; 1816; 1817 …
- Art; Archaeology; Architecture; Literature; Music; Philosophy; Science; +...

The year 1807 in science and technology involved some significant events, listed below.

== Astronomy ==
- March 29 – H. W. Olbers discovers the asteroid which Carl Friedrich Gauss names Vesta.

== Chemistry ==
- Potassium and sodium are isolated by Sir Humphry Davy.
- The use of fulminate in firearms is patented by Scottish clergyman Alexander John Forsyth.

== Geology ==
- The Geological Society is founded in London; among the more prominent founders are William Babington, James Parkinson, Humphry Davy and George Bellas Greenough.

== Mathematics ==
- William Wallace proves that any two simple polygons of equal area are equidecomposable, later known as the Wallace–Bolyai–Gerwien theorem.

== Medicine ==
- Samuel Hahnemann first introduces the term 'homeopathy' in an essay, "Indications of the Homeopathic Employment of Medicines in Ordinary Practice", published in Versammlung der Hufelandische medicinisch-chirurgischen Gesellschaft.
- British Army surgeon John Vetch describes the keratoconjunctivitis ("Egyptian ophthalmia") suffered by troops returned from service overseas; he identifies it as epidemic.

== Technology ==
- July 20 – French brothers Claude and Nicéphore Niépce receive a patent for their Pyréolophore, an early internal combustion engine, having demonstrated it powering a boat on the Saône.
- August 17 – Robert Fulton's North River Steamboat makes her first trip from New York City to Albany.
- November 19 – English inventor Lionel Lukin launches the world's first sailing self-righting rescue life-boat, the Frances Anne, at Lowestoft.
- William Cubitt patents self-regulating sails for windmills.
- Henry Maudslay patents an improved table engine.
- William Hyde Wollaston patents the camera lucida.

== Zoology ==
- April 21 – The Tasmanian devil is first described, by George Prideaux Robert Harris.

== Publications ==
- Alexander von Humboldt's Le Voyage aux Régions equinoxiales du Nouveau Continent, fait en 1799–1804, par Alexandre de Humboldt et Aimé Bonpland begins publication.
- Thomas Young's A Course of Lectures on Natural Philosophy and the Mechanical Arts published.

== Awards ==
- Copley Medal: Everard Home

== Births ==
- January 28 – Robert McClure, Irish-born Arctic explorer (died 1873)
- May 28 – Louis Agassiz, Swiss-born American zoologist and geologist (died 1873)
- November 14 – Auguste Laurent, French chemist (died 1853)
- November 30 – William Farr, English epidemiologist (died 1883)

== Deaths ==
- February 27 – Louise du Pierry, French astronomer (born 1746)
- April 4 – Jérôme Lalande, French astronomer (born 1732)
- December 5 – Francis Willis, English physician specialising in mental disorders (born 1718)
