= 1813 in science =

List of years in science	(table)
- … 1803; 1804; 1805; 1806; 1807; 1808; 1809; 1810; 1811; 1812; 1813; 1814; 1815; 1816; 1817; 1818; 1819; 1820; 1821; 1822; 1823 …
- Art; Archaeology; Architecture; Literature; Music; Philosophy; Science; +...

The year 1813 in science and technology involved some significant events, listed below.

== Biology ==
- April – William Charles Wells reads a paper to the Royal Society of London making the first clear statement about natural selection.
- Charles Waterton begins the process of turning his estate at Walton Hall, West Yorkshire, England, into what is, in effect, the world's first nature reserve.

== Chemistry ==
- Mathieu Orfila publishes his groundbreaking Traité des poisons, formalizing the field of toxicology.
- Louis Jacques Thénard commences publication of his textbook Traité de chimie élémentaire, théorique et pratique in Paris.
- Edward Howard invents the enclosed vacuum pan for refining sugar.

== Exploration ==
- May 11 – Gregory Blaxland, William Lawson and William Wentworth leave on an expedition to cross the Blue Mountains (New South Wales).

== Mathematics ==
- S. D. Poisson publishes Poisson's equation, his correction of Laplace's second order partial differential equation for potential.

== Medicine ==
- English physician Thomas Tutton publishes Tracts on Delirium Tremens, on Peritonitis, and on Some other Internal Inflammatory Affections, and on the Gout in London, providing case studies of delirium tremens.

== Physics ==
- British engineer Peter Ewart supports the idea of the conservation of energy in his paper "On the measure of moving force".

== Sociology ==
- Henri de Saint-Simon publishes Physiologie sociale.

== Technology ==
- Probable date – George E. Clymer invents the Columbian press.

== Institutions ==
- March 1 – Sir Humphry Davy employs Michael Faraday as "chemical assistant" at the Royal Institution of Great Britain in London.

== Awards ==
- Copley Medal: William Thomas Brande

== Births ==
- January 19 – Henry Bessemer, English inventor (died 1898)
- February 18 – Karl Weltzien, Russian-born German inorganic chemist, an organizer of the Karlsruhe Congress (died 1870)
- March 19 – David Livingstone, Scottish missionary and explorer (died 1873)
- April 16 - Justin Benoît, French surgeon and anatomist (died 1893)
- July 12 – Claude Bernard, French physiologist (died 1878)
- October 17 – Georg Büchner, Hessian-born writer and anatomist (died 1837)
- December 19 – Thomas Andrews, Irish chemist (died 1885)
- December 29 – Alexander Parkes, English chemist (died 1890)
- William Bullock, American inventor (died 1867)

== Deaths ==
- April 10 – Joseph Louis Lagrange, Piedmont-born mathematician (born 1736)
- April 19 – Benjamin Rush, Founding Father of the United States, chemist and physician (born 1746)
- April 27 – General Zebulon Pike, American explorer (born 1779)
- May – Johann Karl Wilhelm Illiger, German zoologist (born 1775)
- July 22 – George Shaw, English naturalist (born 1751)
- August 23 – Alexander Wilson, Scottish American ornithologist (born 1766)
