= 1869 in science =

List of years in science	(table)
- … 1859; 1860; 1861; 1862; 1863; 1864; 1865; 1866; 1867; 1868; 1869; 1870; 1871; 1872; 1873; 1874; 1875; 1876; 1877; 1878; 1879 …
- Art; Archaeology; Architecture; Literature; Music; Philosophy; Science; +...

The year 1869 in science and technology involved some significant events, listed below.

== Events ==
- November 4 – The first issue of scientific journal Nature is published in London, edited by Norman Lockyer.

== Chemistry ==
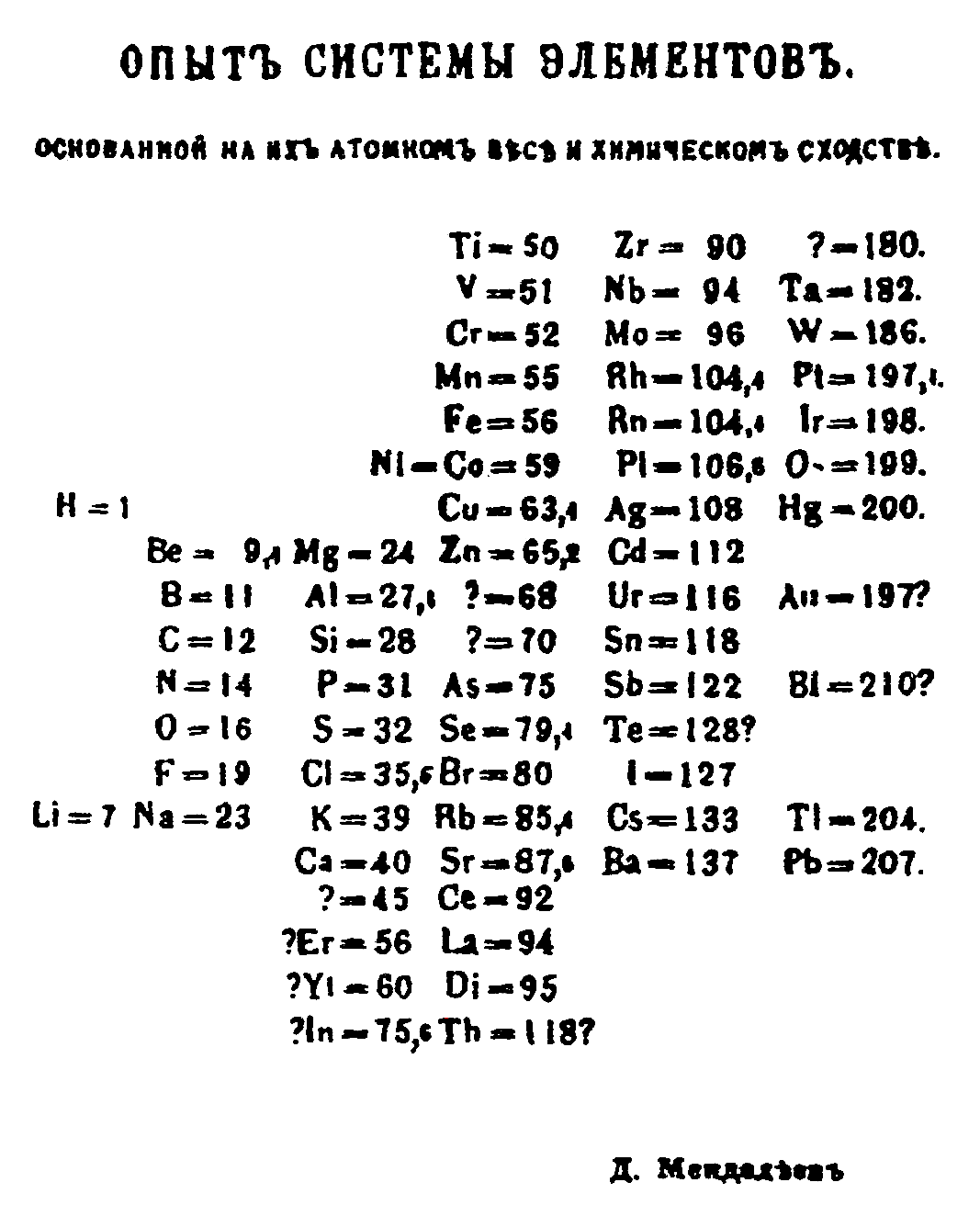
Mendeleev's 1869 periodic table

- March 6 – Dmitri Mendeleev makes a formal presentation of his periodic table to the Russian Chemical Society.
- June 15 – John Wesley Hyatt patents celluloid, in Albany, New York.
- July 15 – Hippolyte Mège-Mouriès files a patent for margarine (as oleomargarine) in France as a beef tallow and skimmed milk substitute for butter.
- German chemist Lothar Meyer makes a formal presentation of the revised and expanded version of his independently-created 1864 periodic table, „Die Natur der chemischen Elemente als Funktion ihrer Atomgewichte".
- Publication of Adolphe Wurtz's Dictionnaire de chimie pure et appliquée begins in Paris.

== Life sciences ==
- April 6 – The American Museum of Natural History is founded in New York.
- June 24 – Sea Birds Preservation Act passed in the United Kingdom, preventing killing of designated species during the breeding season, the first Act to offer any protection to British wild birds.
- Paul Langerhans discovers the pancreatic islets.
- Friedrich Miescher discovers deoxyribonucleic acid (DNA) in the pus of discarded surgical bandages. Found in the nuclei of cells, Miescher names it "nuclein".
- Neurasthenia is first published as a diagnosis in psychopathology by Michigan alienist E. H. Van Deusen of the Kalamazoo asylum followed a few months later by New York neurologist George Miller Beard.
- French missionary and naturalist Père Armand David receives the skin of a giant panda from a hunter, the first time this species has become known to a Westerner; he also first describes a specimen of the "pocket handkerchief tree", which will be named in his honor as Davidia involucrata.
- Alfred Russel Wallace publishes The Malay Archipelago.

== Mathematics ==
- W. Stanley Jevons publishes The Substitution of Similars and has a "Logic Piano" constructed to work out problems in symbolic logic.
- Hermann Schwarz devises Schwarz–Christoffel mapping.

== Technology ==
- Approximate date – Henry Christopher Mance develops a practical military heliograph in the British Raj.

== Awards ==
- Copley Medal: Henri Victor Regnault
- Wollaston Medal for Geology: Henry Clifton Sorby

== Births ==
- February 14 – C. T. R. Wilson (died 1959), Scottish physicist and meteorologist, recipient of the Nobel Prize in Physics.
- February 27 – Alice Hamilton (died 1970), American physician.
- April 8 – Harvey Cushing (died 1939), American neurosurgeon.
- April 17 – Robert Robertson (died 1949), Scottish-born chemist.
- June 19 – Christopher Addison (died 1951), English anatomist and politician.
- July 18 – Maria von Linden (died 1936), German bacteriologist and zoologist.
- August 23 – Robert Gunther (died 1940), English historian of science.
- October 3 – Robert W. Paul (died 1943), English pioneer of cinematography.
- November 23 – Valdemar Poulsen (died 1942), Danish audio engineer.
- December 16 – Bertha Lamme (died 1943), American electrical engineer.
- Helen Boyle (died 1957), British physician and psychologist.

== Deaths ==
- July 22 – John A. Roebling (born 1806), German American bridge engineer.
- July 28 – Carl Gustav Carus (born 1789), German physiologist and landscape painter.
- September 11 – Thomas Graham (born 1805), Scottish chemist.
