= 1814 in paleontology =

List of years in paleontology	(table)
- … 1804; 1805; 1806; 1807; 1808; 1809; 1810; 1811; 1812; 1813; 1814; 1815; 1816; 1817; 1818; 1819; 1820; 1821; 1822; 1823; 1824 …
- In science 1811 1812 1813 1814 1815 1816 1817
- Art; Archaeology; Architecture; Literature; Music; Philosophy; Science; +...

Paleontology or palaeontology is the study of prehistoric life forms on Earth through the examination of plant and animal fossils. This includes the study of body fossils, tracks (ichnites), burrows, cast-off parts, fossilised feces (coprolites), palynomorphs and chemical residues. Because humans have encountered fossils for millennia, paleontology has a long history both before and after becoming formalized as a science. This article records significant discoveries and events related to paleontology that occurred or were published in the year 184.

== Reptiles ==
=== New taxa ===
Taxon	Novelty	Status	Author(s)	Age	Unit	Location	Notes	Images
Crocodilus priscus	Sp. nov.	Valid	von Sömmerring	Tithonian	Mörnsheim Formation	Germany	Later named Aeolodon priscus by Christian Erich Hermann von Meyer	
