= 1874 in science =

| List of years in science | (table) |
- … 1864; 1865; 1866; 1867; 1868; 1869; 1870; 1871; 1872; 1873; 1874; 1875; 1876; 1877; 1878; 1879; 1880; 1881; 1882; 1883; 1884 …
- Art; Archaeology; Architecture; Literature; Music; Philosophy; Science; +...

The year 1874 in science and technology involved some significant events, listed below.

== Astronomy ==
- December 9 – a transit of Venus across the Sun is observed in Muddapur, India, by an astronomical expedition led by Pietro Tacchini

== Chemistry ==
- Per Teodor Cleve discovers that didymium is in fact two elements, now known as neodymium and praseodymium
- C. R. Alder Wright synthesizes heroin
- Othmar Zeidler synthesises DDT
- Carl Schorlemmer publishes A Manual of Chemistry of the Carbon Compounds; or, Organic Chemistry
- Jacobus van 't Hoff and Achille Le Bel independently propose that organic molecular models can be three-dimensional

== Exploration ==
- February – the Challenger expedition provides geological evidence for the existence of the continent of Antarctica

== History of science ==
- John William Draper publishes History of the Conflict between Religion and Science

== Mathematics ==
- Georg Cantor's paper, "Ueber eine Eigenschaft des Inbegriffes aller reellen algebraischen Zahlen" ("On a Property of the Collection of All Real Algebraic Numbers"), published in Crelle's Journal, considered as the origin of set theory
- William Stanley Jevons publishes his comprehensive treatise on logic, The Principles of Science
- Sofia Kovalevskaya is awarded a doctorate in mathematics at the University of Göttingen, the first woman in Europe to hold that degree. Her submission includes a paper on partial differential equations containing a presentation of the Cauchy-Kovalevski theorem

== Medicine ==
- April 1 – Dr Frances Morgan marries Dr George Hoggan and they set up the first husband-and-wife general medical practice in the United Kingdom
- Autumn – London School of Medicine for Women founded
- A. T. Still introduces osteopathic medicine in the United States

== Neuroscience ==
- Vladimir Alekseyevich Betz describes giant pyramidal cells in the motor cortex, later called Betz cells

== Physics ==
- James Clerk Maxwell produces a model of Maxwell's thermodynamic surface

== Psychology ==
- Franz Brentano publishes Psychologie vom Empirischen Standpunkte (Psychology from an Empirical Standpoint)

== Technology ==
- May 20 – Levi Strauss and Jacob Davis receive a United States patent for blue denim jeans with copper rivets
- July 1 – Sholes and Glidden typewriter, with cylindrical platen and QWERTY keyboard, first marketed, in the United States
- July 4 – official opening of Eads Bridge (combined road and rail steel arch) over the Mississippi River at St. Louis, Missouri, designed by James B. Eads. It is the longest arch bridge in the world at this time, with an overall length of 6,442 feet (1,964 m); the first use of true steel as a primary structural material in a major bridge project; the first built using cantilever support methods exclusively; and the first major project to make use of pneumatic caissons
- Invention of barbed wire by Joseph Glidden

== Awards ==
- Copley Medal: Louis Pasteur
- Wollaston Medal: Oswald Heer

== Births ==
- January 22 – Leonard Eugene Dickson (died 1954), American mathematician
- February 2 – Ernest Shackleton (died 1922), Anglo-Irish Antarctic explorer
- April 25 – Guglielmo Marconi (died 1937), Italian inventor
- September 12 – Redcliffe N. Salaman (died 1955), English botanist
- September 26 – Oakes Ames (died 1950), American botanist
- October 13 – Kiyotsugu Hirayama (died 1943), Japanese astronomer
- November 27 – Chaim Weizmann (died 1952), Russian-born chemist and first President of Israel
- November 29 – António Egas Moniz (died 1955), Portuguese neurologist, winner of the 1949 Nobel Prize in Physiology or Medicine
- December 6 – Elizabeth Laird (died 1969), Canadian physicist
- December 28 – Arthur Schüller (died 1957), Austrian-born neuroradiologist

== Deaths ==
- January 16 – Max Schultze (born 1825), German physiologist
- January 24 – Johann Philipp Reis (born 1834), German physicist and inventor
- February 17 – Adolphe Quetelet (born 1796), Belgian mathematician and astronomer
- February 19 – Carl Ernst Bock (born 1809), German physician and anatomist
- March 3 – Forbes Winslow (born 1810), English psychiatrist
- March 10 – Moritz von Jacobi (born 1801), German-born electrical engineer
- March 14 – Johann Heinrich von Mädler (born 1794), German astronomer
- March 28 – Peter Andreas Hansen (born 1795), Danish-born German astronomer
- April 13 – James Bogardus (born 1800), American inventor
- November 21 – Sir William Jardine, 7th Baronet (born 1800), Scottish-born naturalist
