= 1805 in science =

List of years in science	(table)
- … 1795; 1796; 1797; 1798; 1799; 1800; 1801; 1802; 1803; 1804; 1805; 1806; 1807; 1808; 1809; 1810; 1811; 1812; 1813; 1814; 1815 …
- Art; Archaeology; Architecture; Literature; Music; Philosophy; Science; +...

Significant events in 1805 in science and technology are listed.

== Biology ==
- Jean Henri Jaume Saint-Hilaire publishes Exposition des Familles naturelles et de la Germination des Plantes, contentant la description de 2337 genres et d'environ 4000 espèces, 112 planches dont les figures ont ete dessinées par l'auteur, popularising the Jussiaean classification system.
- Marie Jules César Savigny publishes Histoire naturelle et mythologique de l'Ibis in Paris, the first illustrated monograph on the ibis.

== Chemistry ==
- John Dalton's list of molecular weights is first published.
- Joseph Louis Gay-Lussac discovers that water is composed of two parts hydrogen and one part oxygen by volume.
- Jane Marcet's elementary textbook for young people, Conversations on Chemistry ("intended more especially for the female sex"), is published anonymously in London. It proves extremely popular on both sides of the Atlantic, running through at least forty editions.

== Exploration ==
- April 7 – The Lewis and Clark Expedition leaves Fort Mandan, bound for the Pacific Ocean.
- August 9 – Zebulon Pike leaves St. Louis to explore the headwaters of the Mississippi River.
- November 16 – The Lewis and Clark expedition reaches the Pacific Ocean at the mouth of the Columbia River.

== Mathematics ==
- Adrien-Marie Legendre publishes the first clear and concise exposition of the least squares method for fitting a curve to a given set of observations.

== Medicine ==
- German Army surgeon Philipp Bozzini invents the lichtleiter, ancestor of the endoscope, for examination of bodily orifices.
- James Parkinson publishes Observations on the Nature and Cure of the Gout.
- Japanese physician Udagawa Genshin publishes Ensai Ihan ("Medical precepts of the West").
- First record of a water birth, in France.

== Meteorology ==
- The Beaufort scale of wind speed is devised by British Royal Navy officer Francis Beaufort.

== Technology ==
- September – William Congreve first demonstrates the solid-fuel Congreve rocket for use as an artillery weapon.
- November 26 – The Ellesmere Canal's Pontcysyllte Aqueduct is opened in Wales; built by Thomas Telford and William Jessop, its cast iron trough is 1,007 ft (307 m) long and 126 ft (38 m) above the River Dee beneath.

== Awards ==
- Copley Medal: Humphry Davy

== Births ==
- February 13 – Peter Gustav Lejeune Dirichlet, mathematician (died 1859)
- May 12 – William Rowan Hamilton, mathematician, physicist and astronomer (died 1865)
- July 5 – Robert FitzRoy, admiral and meteorologist (suicide 1865)
- August 13 - Antoine Constant Saucerotte, French physician (died 1884)
- December 16 – Isidore Geoffroy Saint-Hilaire, zoologist (died 1861)
- December 20 – Thomas Graham, chemist (died 1869)
- December 22 – John Obadiah Westwood, entomologist (died 1893)
- Mary Seacole (née Grant), nurse (died 1881)

== Deaths ==
- January 23 – Claude Chappe, French inventor of the mechanical semaphore system (born 1763)
- February 17 – Josephus Nicolaus Laurenti, Viennese herpetologist (born 1735)
- May 16 – Christiaan Brunings, Dutch hydraulic engineer (born 1736)
- July 2 – Patrick Russell, Scottish-born surgeon and herpetologist (born 1726)
- December 23
  - Geneviève Thiroux d'Arconville, French novelist, translator and chemist (born 1720)
  - Pehr Osbeck, Swedish botanist and explorer, pupil of Linnaeus (born 1723)
