= 1865 in science =

List of years in science	(table)
- … 1855; 1856; 1857; 1858; 1859; 1860; 1861; 1862; 1863; 1864; 1865; 1866; 1867; 1868; 1869; 1870; 1871; 1872; 1873; 1874; 1875 …
- Art; Archaeology; Architecture; Literature; Music; Philosophy; Science; +...

The year 1865 in science and technology involved some significant events, listed below.

== Archaeology ==
- John Lubbock publishes Pre-historic Times, as Illustrated by Ancient Remains, and the Manners and Customs of Modern Savages, including his coinage of the term Palæolithic.

== Astronomy ==
- Vassar College Observatory opens at Poughkeepsie, New York, with Maria Mitchell as its first director.

== Chemistry ==
- Friedrich Kekulé proposes a ring structure for benzene.
- Adolf von Baeyer begins work on indigo dye, a milestone in modern industrial organic chemistry which revolutionizes the dye industry.
- Johann Josef Loschmidt indirectly determines the number of molecules in a mole, later named the Avogadro constant.

== Economics ==
- William Stanley Jevons publishes his book The Coal Question, which will form the scientific basis for the Jevons paradox.

== Life sciences ==
- Louis Pasteur shows that the air is full of bacteria.
- Joseph Lister begins to experiment with antiseptic surgery in Glasgow using carbolic acid.
- Max Schultze gives the first known description of the platelet.
- Claude Bernard publishes Principes de Médecine experimentale.
- February 8 & March 8 – Gregor Mendel reads his paper, Versuche über Pflanzenhybriden (Experiments on Plant Hybridization), at two meetings of the Natural History Society of Brünn in Moravia.
- May 17 – Father Armand David first observes Père David's Deer in China.
- June–August – Francis Galton formulates eugenics.
- September – John Henry Walsh (writing as 'Stonehenge' in the magazine The Field) gives the first definition of a dog breed standard (for the pointer) based on physical form.
- September 28 – Elizabeth Garrett Anderson obtains a licence from the Society of Apothecaries in London to practice medicine, the first woman to qualify as a doctor in the United Kingdom, and sets up in her own practice.

== Physics ==
- Rudolf Clausius gives the first mathematical version of the concept of entropy, and also names it.
- James Clerk Maxwell publishes A Dynamical Theory of the Electromagnetic Field.

== Technology ==
- Aveling and Porter produce the world's first steam roller at Rochester in England.
- Hermann Sprengel produces the Sprengel pump which is capable of creating a significant vacuum.

== Awards ==
- Copley Medal: Michel Chasles
- Wollaston Medal in Geology: Thomas Davidson

== Births ==
- January 22 – Friedrich Paschen (died 1947), German physicist.
- February 1 – Henry Luke Bolley (died 1956), American plant pathologist.
- March 19 – William Morton Wheeler (died 1937), American entomologist.
- March 31 – Anandi Gopal Joshi (died 1887), Indian physician.
- April 28 – Charles W. Woodworth (died 1940), American entomologist.
- June 27 – John Monash (died 1931), Australian civil engineer and General.
- August 10 – Charles Close (died 1952), Jersey-born cartographer.
- October 12 – Arthur Harden (died 1940), English biochemist, Nobel Prize in Chemistry recipient.
- November 4 – Chevalier Jackson (died 1958), American laryngologist and pioneer of endoscopy.

== Deaths ==
- January 14 – Marie-Anne Libert (born 1782), Belgian botanist.
- January 31 – Hugh Falconer (born 1808), British geologist, botanist, paleontologist and paleoanthropologist.
- April 23 – Diego de Argumosa (born 1792), Spanish surgeon.
- April 30 – Robert FitzRoy (born 1805), English admiral and meteorologist, suicide.
- May 27 – Charles Waterton (born 1782), English naturalist and explorer.
- June 5 – Sir John Richardson (born 1787), Scottish-born naturalist, explorer and naval surgeon.
- July 25 – Dr. James Barry (born 1789-1799), Irish-born military surgeon.
- August 12 – Sir William Jackson Hooker (born 1785), English botanist.
- August 13 – Ignaz Semmelweis (born 1818), Hungarian physician, following restraint in insane asylum.
- August 26 – Johann Franz Encke (born 1791), German astronomer.
- August 29 – Robert Remak (born 1815), Polish/Prussian Jewish embryologist.
- September 2 – Sir William Rowan Hamilton (born 1805), Irish mathematician, physicist and astronomer.
- October 17 – Joseph-François Malgaigne (born 1806), French surgeon.
