= 1816 in paleontology =

List of years in paleontology	(table)
- … 1806; 1807; 1808; 1809; 1810; 1811; 1812; 1813; 1814; 1815; 1816; 1817; 1818; 1819; 1820; 1821; 1822; 1823; 1824; 1825; 1826 …
- In science 1813 1814 1815 1816 1817 1818 1819
- Art; Archaeology; Architecture; Literature; Music; Philosophy; Science; +...

Paleontology or palaeontology is the study of prehistoric life forms on Earth through the examination of plant and animal fossils. This includes the study of body fossils, tracks (ichnites), burrows, cast-off parts, fossilised feces (coprolites), palynomorphs and chemical residues. Because humans have encountered fossils for millennia, paleontology has a long history both before and after becoming formalized as a science. This article records significant discoveries and events related to paleontology that occurred or were published in the year 1816.

== Reptiles ==
- Henry Englefield publishes a general work on the geology of the Isle of Wight, reporting the discovery of large, almost certainly dinosaurian bones being discovered by geologist Thomas Webster in what would later be identified as Cretaceous strata.
