= 1893 in science =

The year 1893 in science and technology involved some significant events, listed below.

== Biology ==
- July 11 – Kōkichi Mikimoto, in Japan, develops the method to seed and grow cultured pearls.
- Henry Luke Bolley discovers a method of treating smut with formaldehyde.

== Chemistry ==
- Hans Goldschmidt discovers the thermite reaction.
- Nagai Nagayoshi synthesizes methamphetamine from ephedrine.
- Alfred Werner discovers the octahedral structure of cobalt complexes, thus establishing the field of coordination chemistry.

== Earth sciences ==
- Eduard Suess postulates the former existence of the Tethys Sea.

== Exploration ==
- Mary Kingsley lands in Sierra Leone on the first of her journeys through Africa in the interests of anthropology and natural history.

== Mathematics ==
- J. J. Sylvester poses what becomes known as the Sylvester–Gallai theorem in geometry.
- Geometric Exercises in Paper Folding by T. Sundara Row is first published in Madras.

== Medicine ==
- July 9 – Daniel H. Williams completes the first successful open heart surgery.
- October 5 – Johns Hopkins Medical School opens in the United States.
- Emil Kraepelin introduces the concept of dementia praecox in the classification of mental disorders, distinguishing it from mood disorder in his Lehrbuch der Psychiatrie (4th edition).
- Ádám Politzer describes otosclerosis for the first time.
- Vladimir Bekhterev describes Ankylosing spondylitis.

== Physics ==
- Wilhelm Wien formulates Wien's displacement law.

== Technology ==
- January 2 – Webb C. Ball introduces railroad chronometers which become the general railroad timepiece standards in North America.
- February 1 – Thomas Edison finishes construction of the first motion picture studio in West Orange, New Jersey.
- February 11 – János Csonka and Donát Bánki apply for a patent for the carburetor in Hungary.
- February 23 – Rudolf Diesel receives a patent for the diesel engine. In this year he also publishes his treatise Theorie und Konstruktion eines rationellen Wärmemotors zum Ersatz der Dampfmaschine und der heute bekannten Verbrennungsmotoren.
- February 28 – Edward Goodrich Acheson patents the method for making the abrasive silicon carbide powder.
- May 9 – Edison's 1½ inch system of Kinetoscope is first demonstrated in public at the Brooklyn Institute.
- May – William Scherzer (dies July 20) files a patent for his design of rolling lift bridge.
- June 21 – The first Ferris Wheel opens to the public at the World's Columbian Exposition in Chicago.
- July 12 – Prototype of Diesel's Motor 250/400 (150/400) completed; first run August 10 (on petrol).
- July 25 – Completion of the Corinth Canal in Greece.
- August 17 – Wilhelm Maybach patents the spray nozzle carburetor in France.
- Refinery for Pacific Coast Borax Company in Alameda, California, designed by Ernest L. Ransome, is the first major reinforced concrete building in the United States.
- The first sousaphone is built by James Welsh Pepper at the request of bandmaster John Philip Sousa in the United States.

== Awards ==
- Copley Medal: George Gabriel Stokes
- Wollaston Medal for Geology: Nevil Story Maskelyne

== Births ==
- February 3 – Gaston Julia (died 1978), French mathematician.
- February 24 – Tokushichi Mishima (died 1975), Japanese inventor and metallurgist.
- April 29 – Harold Urey (died 1981), American winner of the Nobel Prize in Chemistry.
- April 30 – Roy Chadwick (died 1947), English aircraft designer.
- June 13 – Alan A. Griffith (died 1963), English stress engineer.
- August 5 – Sydney Camm (died 1966), English aircraft designer.
- August 15 – Leslie Comrie (died 1950), New Zealand astronomer and computing pioneer.
- August 24 – Haim Ernst Wertheimer (died 1978), German Jewish biochemist.
- August 25 – Henry Trendley Dean (died 1962), American dental researcher.
- September 16 – Albert Szent-Györgyi (died 1986), Hungarian physiologist, winner of the Nobel Prize in Physiology or Medicine.
- October 23 – Ernst Öpik (died 1985), Estonian astronomer and astrophysicist.
- November 3 – Edward Adelbert Doisy (died 1986), American biochemist, winner of the Nobel Prize in Physiology or Medicine.
- December 3 – Wilhelm Pelikan (died 1981), Austrian chemist.
- December 14 – Alf Lysholm (died 1973), Swedish mechanical engineer.
- December – Eugène Gabritschevsky (died 1979), Russian biologist and artist.

== Deaths ==
- January 2 – John Obadiah Westwood (born 1805), English entomologist.
- January 7 – Jožef Stefan (born 1835), Slovenian physicist and mathematician.
- March 3 – Orlando Whistlecraft (died 1810), English meteorologist.
- August 16 – Jean-Martin Charcot (born 1825), French neurologist.
- September 1 – Leonard Jenyns (born 1800), English natural historian.
- November 6 - Justin Benoît, (born 1813), French surgeon and anatomist
- December 4 – John Tyndall (born 1820), British physicist.
- December 6 – Rudolf Wolf (born 1816), Swiss astronomer.
- December 25 – Marie Durocher (born 1809), Brazilian obstetrician and physician.
- December 28 – Richard Spruce (born 1817), English botanist.
