= 1820 in paleontology =

List of years in paleontology	(table)
- … 1810; 1811; 1812; 1813; 1814; 1815; 1816; 1817; 1818; 1819; 1820; 1821; 1822; 1823; 1824; 1825; 1826; 1827; 1828; 1829; 1830 …
- In science 1817 1818 1819 1820 1821 1822 1823
- Art; Archaeology; Architecture; Literature; Music; Philosophy; Science; +...

Paleontology or palaeontology is the study of prehistoric life forms on Earth through the examination of plant and animal fossils. This includes the study of body fossils, tracks (ichnites), burrows, cast-off parts, fossilised feces (coprolites), palynomorphs and chemical residues. Because humans have encountered fossils for millennia, paleontology has a long history both before and after becoming formalized as a science. This article records significant discoveries and events related to paleontology that occurred or were published in the year 1820.

== Dinosaurs ==
- Dinosaur bones are discovered in Connecticut's red sandstones. The bones are so small that they were originally believed to be human remains. Richard Swann Lull later properly identified them as dinosaurian and proposed that these fossils may have belonged to a coelurosaur. Later work by Peter Galton in 1976 determined that these fossils were actually from a prosauropod.
