= 1943 in science =

The year 1943 in science and technology involved some significant events, listed below.

== Biology ==
- July 21 – Living specimens of Metasequoia glyptostroboides, the Dawn Redwood, previously known only as a Mesozoic fossil, are located in China.
- The University of Oxford acquires the nearby Wytham Woods which become an important centre for research into ecology in England.
- David Lack's study The Life of the Robin is published in England.
- Luria–Delbrück experiment

== Computer science ==
- March–December – Construction of British prototype Mark I Colossus computer, the world's first totally electronic programmable computing device, at the Post Office Research Station, Dollis Hill, to assist in cryptanalysis at Bletchley Park.
- May 17 – The United States Army contracts with the University of Pennsylvania's Moore School to develop the ENIAC.

== Earth sciences ==
- February 20 – The cinder cone volcano Parícutin begins to appear in Mexico, giving volcanologists an unusual opportunity to observe its complete life cycle.

== Nuclear physics ==
- January 1 – Project Y, the Manhattan Project's secret laboratory at Los Alamos, New Mexico, for development and production of the first atomic bombs under the direction of J. Robert Oppenheimer, begins operations.

== Pharmacology ==
- March 23 – The drugs Vicodin and Lortab are made in Germany.
- October 19 – The antibiotic streptomycin (the first antibiotic remedy for tuberculosis) is first isolated by Albert Schatz in the laboratory of Selman Abraham Waksman at Rutgers University in the United States.
- December – Winston Churchill's recurring bacterial pneumonia is successfully treated with the sulphapyridine M&B 693, a first-generation sulphonamide antibiotic.
- A golden mould, Penicillium chrysogenum, growing on an American cantaloupe in Peoria, Illinois, is found to be ideal for mass production of penicillin.

== Psychology ==
- Abraham Maslow proposes the Hierarchy of Needs theory of psychology in his paper "A Theory of Human Motivation".

== Physiology and medicine ==
- April 16–19 – Albert Hofmann discovers the hallucinogenic properties of lysergic acid diethylamide.
- Leo Kanner of the Johns Hopkins Hospital first publicly adopts the term autism in its modern sense in English in referring to early infantile autism and describes "Patient No. 1", Donald Triplett.
- Warren S. McCulloch and Walter Pitts publish "A Logical Calculus of the Ideas Immanent in Nervous Activity" in Bulletin of Mathematical Biophysics, considered seminal in neural network theory.
- Dr. Willem J. Kolff builds the first dialysis machine, in the occupied Netherlands.
- New Zealand-born British anaesthetist Robert Macintosh introduces his new curved laryngoscope blade for tracheal intubation.

== Technology ==
- March 5 – The Gloster Meteor, the first operational military jet aircraft for the Allies of World War II, has its first test flight, in England.
- May 16–17 – Operation Chastise: British Royal Air Force attacks German dams using 'bouncing bombs' designed by Barnes Wallis.
- Lyle Goodhue and William Sullivan patent the refillable aerosol spray in the United States, for use with mosquito–repellant.
- Krueger flaps for aircraft wings are invented by Werner Krüger and evaluated in the wind tunnels in Göttingen.

== Awards ==
- Nobel Prizes
  - Physics – Otto Stern
  - Chemistry – George de Hevesy
  - Medicine – Carl Peter Henrik Dam, Edward Adelbert Doisy

== Births ==
- January 14 – Ralph Steinman (died 2011), Canadian-born cell biologist, awarded Nobel Prize in Physiology or Medicine (2011).
- April 26 – Christiane Floyd, Austrian-born computer scientist.
- May 9 – Colin Pillinger (died 2014), English astrophysicist.
- May 14 – Richard Peto, English epidemiologist.
- June 6 – Richard Smalley (died 2005), American organic chemist, recipient of Nobel Prize in Chemistry (1996) for discovery of buckminsterfullerene.
- June 16 – Nancy Doe Hopkins, American molecular biologist and advocate for women in science.
- June 22 – J. Michael Kosterlitz, Scottish-born condensed matter physicist, winner of the Nobel Prize in Physics (2016).
- June 23 – Vint Cerf, American Internet pioneer.
- July 11 – Hilary Kahn (died 2007), South African-born English computer scientist.
- August 3 – Masato Sagawa, Japanese inventor.
- August 10 – Louis E. Brus, American chemist, recipient of Nobel Prize in Chemistry (2023).
- August 29 – Arthur B. McDonald, Canadian astrophysicist, recipient of Nobel Prize in Physics (2015).
- September 20 – Richard McGehee, American mathematician working on celestial mechanics.
- December 7 – Nick Katz, American mathematician.
- Mary Lake Polan, American obstetrician and gynecologist.
- Steen Willadsen, Danish-born embryologist.

== Deaths ==
- January 5 – George Washington Carver (born c.1864), African American agricultural botanist.
- January 7 – Nikola Tesla (born 1856), Serbian American inventor.
- January 24 – Carl Brigham (born 1890), American pioneer of psychometrics.
- January 26 – Nikolai Vavilov (born 1887), Russian plant pathologist (in prison).
- February 14 – David Hilbert (born 1862), German mathematician.
- February 20 – Ernest Guglielminetti (born 1862), Swiss physician
- February 23 – Abraham Buschke (born 1868), German Jewish dermatologist (in Theresienstadt concentration camp).
- March 2 – Gisela Januszewska (born 1867), Austrian public health physician (in Theresienstadt concentration camp).
- March 28 – Robert W. Paul (born 1869), English pioneer of cinematography.
- April 8 – Kiyotsugu Hirayama (born 1874), Japanese astronomer.
- June 26 – Karl Landsteiner (born 1868), Austrian-born American Jewish physiologist.
- July 5 – Charles Gandy (born 1872), French physician.
- July 7 – Hugh Whistler (born 1889), English ornithologist of India.
- September 23 – John Bradfield (born 1867), Australian civil engineer.
- September 30 – Carl Edvard Johansson (born 1864), Swedish metrologist.
- October 1 – Albert Stewart Meek (born 1871), English-born Australian ornithologist.
- November 14 – Frank Leverett (born 1859), American glaciologist.
- November 20 – Bertha Lamme Feicht (born 1869), American electrical engineer.
