= 1822 in paleontology =

List of years in paleontology	(table)
- … 1812; 1813; 1814; 1815; 1816; 1817; 1818; 1819; 1820; 1821; 1822; 1823; 1824; 1825; 1826; 1827; 1828; 1829; 1830; 1831; 1832 …
- In science 1819 1820 1821 1822 1823 1824 1825
- Art; Archaeology; Architecture; Literature; Music; Philosophy; Science; +...

Paleontology or palaeontology is the study of prehistoric life forms on Earth through the examination of plant and animal fossils. This includes the study of body fossils, tracks (ichnites), burrows, cast-off parts, fossilised feces (coprolites), palynomorphs and chemical residues. Because humans have encountered fossils for millennia, paleontology has a long history both before and after becoming formalized as a science. This article records significant discoveries and events related to paleontology that occurred or were published in the year 1822.

== Dinosaurs ==
- James Parkinson (after whom the disease is named) publishes a general text on paleontology wherein he illustrates and describes teeth belonging to Megalosaurus. Because his reference to this name in print was earlier to William Buckland's formal description of the genus, some people have concluded that Parkinson was the one who invented the name. This is a misconception: Buckland truly deserves credit for the name Megalosaurus and Parkinson got the name from him.
- According to an oft-repeated story, while her husband is treating a patient, Mary Ann Mantell amuses herself by rummaging through a pile of stone rubble and discovers the first fossil of what would later be named Iguanodon. This tooth intrigues her husband, who ascertains the quarry they were excavated from and returns there to successfully discover more fossils belonging to the species. However, some have questioned the authenticity of this story.
- In May, Mantell publishes a book called The Fossils of the South Downs wherein he briefly describes his findings of the fossils belonging to a large reptile, which he would later name Iguanodon.
- Adam Sedgwick noted a recent discovery by William Buckland in the Sandown Bay of the Isle of Wight. These large bones were misinterpreted by Buckland as belonging to a Cetacean. He would later realize that these were in fact Iguanodon bones. The long delay caused by his mistake prevented him from being able to name the genus himself.
