= 1880 in science =

The year 1880 in science and technology included many events, some of which are listed here.

== Archaeology ==
- January – The Gokstad ship is found in Norway, the first Viking ship burial to be excavated.

== Astronomy ==
- September 30 – American doctor Henry Draper takes the first photograph of the Orion Nebula, from Hastings-on-Hudson, New York; this year he also photographs the spectrum of Jupiter.

== Mathematics ==
- July – John Venn popularises Venn diagrams ("Eulerian circles").
- F. Landry finds the largest known Fermat prime, 65,537.
- The United States Census Bureau first encounters the "Alabama paradox".

== Medicine ==
- January 24 – English surgeon Sampson Gamgee reports on his use of the medical dressing Gamgee Tissue.
- July
  - German professor of pathology Karl Eberth first visualizes the bacteria which will become known as Salmonella in the Peyer's patches and spleens of typhoid patients.
  - Scottish surgeon William Macewen reports on his use of orotracheal intubation as an alternative to tracheotomy.
- Moritz Kaposi publishes Pathologie und Therapie der Hautkrankheiten in Vorlesungen für praktische Ärzte und Studierende ("Pathology and treatment of diseases of the skin, for practitioners and students"), a significant textbook in dermatology.

== Physics ==
- February 13 – Thomas Edison observes the Edison effect.
- The first demonstration of the direct piezoelectric effect is made by the brothers Pierre Curie and Jacques Curie.
- Johannes Diderik van der Waals formulates the Law of Corresponding States.

== Technology ==
- January 27 – Thomas Edison is granted a United States patent for the incandescent light bulb.
- February 2
  - The first electric streetlight is installed in Wabash, Indiana (city fully illuminated March 31).
  - The first successful shipment of frozen mutton from Australia arrives in London, aboard the SS Strathleven.
- February 19 – The photophone, an optical speech transmission system, is invented by Alexander Graham Bell and Charles Sumner Tainter in Washington, D.C.
- May 2 – The newly-launched SS Columbia becomes the first transport vehicle to use Edison's incandescent light bulbs when she is lit up for the first time at the foot of Wall Street in New York City.
- May 13 – Edison performs the first test of his electric railway in Menlo Park, New Jersey.
- June 1 – Tinius Olsen is awarded a U.S. patent for his "Little Giant" universal testing machine.
- November 4 – The first cash register is patented by James and John Ritty of Dayton, Ohio.
- Dugald Clerk builds the first successful two-stroke engine.
- James Albert Bonsack produces the first practical cigarette rolling machine.
- Lima Machine Works ships the first Shay locomotive to Ephraim Shay's design to a logger in Grand Rapids, Michigan.

== Publications ==
- February – The journal Science is first published in the United States with financial backing from Thomas Edison.
- Start of publication of Report Of The Scientific Results of the Exploring Voyage of H.M.S. Challenger during the years 1873-76.

== Awards ==
- Copley Medal: James Joseph Sylvester
- Wollaston Medal: Auguste Daubrée

== Births ==
- January 12 – F. Percy Smith (died 1945), English naturalist and pioneer microcinematographer.
- January 18 – Paul Ehrenfest (suicide 1933), Austrian physicist and mathematician.
- January 22 – Frigyes Riesz (died 1956), Hungarian mathematician.
- February 17 – Reginald Farrer (died 1920), English botanist.
- June 21 – Arnold Gesell (died 1961), American developmental psychologist.
- June 24 – Oswald Veblen (died 1960), American mathematician.
- August 17 – Paul Kammerer (suicide 1926), Austrian Lamarckian biologist.
- October 15 – Marie Stopes (died 1958), English paleobotanist and pioneer of birth control.

== Deaths ==
- January 9 – William Budd (born 1811), English physician and epidemiologist.
- May 6 – Friedrich Bayer (born 1825), German manufacturing chemist.
- May 27 – Alfred Swaine Taylor (born 1806), English toxicologist, "father of British forensic medicine".
- July 9 – Paul Broca (born 1824), French anthropologist.
- October 5 – William Lassell (born 1799), English astronomer.
- December 31
  - Eric Holmes (born 1821), British chemist.
  - John Stenhouse (born 1809), Scottish chemist.
