= Marie Durocher =

Brazilian physician

Marie Josefina Mathilde Durocher (6 January 1809 – 25 December 1893) was a Brazilian obstetrician, midwife and physician. She was the first female doctor in Latin America.

== Biography ==
Durocher was born in Paris and moved to Brazil with her parents at the age of eight; she worked with her mother in floristry and fashion, until she was widowed young with two children and decided to follow Madame Piplar and Madame Berghou to become a midwife. She was the first woman to be granted a medical degree from the newly founded Medical School of Rio de Janeiro in 1834.

Durocher was active in her profession for sixty years. She aroused attention with her habit of dressing in men's clothes, as she considered them more practical in her profession than the contemporary women's clothes. She was midwife of the grandchildren of Emperor Pedro II of Brazil. She became the first female member of the Academia Nacional de Medicina in 1871, and was the only woman in the Academy for 50 years.
