= Justin Benoît =

French physician and anatomist

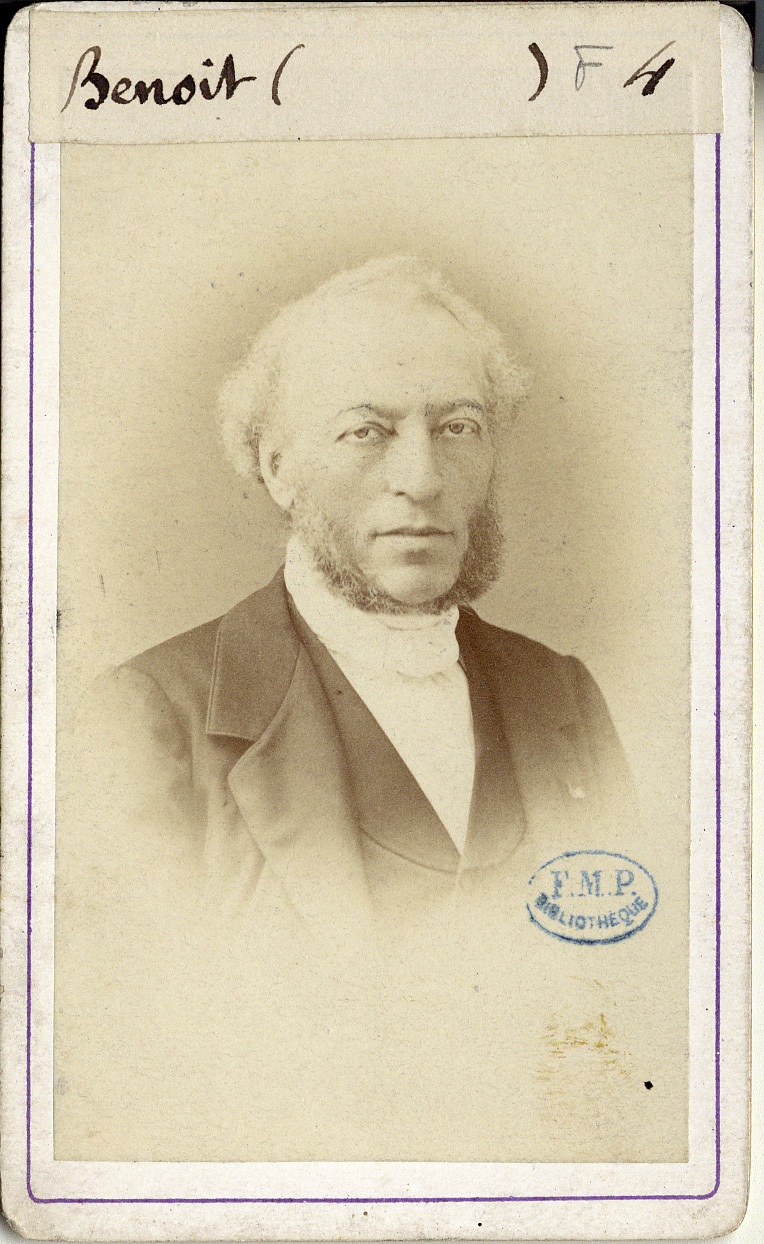
- Justin Benoît by Baudon (Photographer)
- Born: 16 May 1813; Millau, Aveyron, France
- Died: 6 November 1893 (aged 80); Montpellier, Hérault, France
- Resting place: Protestant Cemetery, Montpellier; 43°36′10″N 3°53′08″E)
- Education: University of Montpellier
- Spouse: Héloïse-Mira Cavalier
- Children: Caroline Benoît, wife of General François Perrier
- Scientific career
- Fields: Physician, anatomist
- Workplaces: University of Montpellier
- Thesis: De l'emploi thérapeutique du nitrate d'argent, et spécialement de l'emploi de cette substance dans les maladies (1839)

Justin Benoît (16 April 1813 in Millau – 6 November 1893 in Montpellier) was a French physician and anatomist.

== Biography ==
Son of Guillaume Benoît and Marie Cabantous, (Note: The birth certificate of the Léonore base bears the date of 16 April 1813, both parents (Guillaume and Marie) and one first name: Justin.) Justin Benoît married Héloïse-Mira Cavalier, daughter of Jacques Cavalier, notary, and Louise Vernet. The Benoît couple had four children, including a daughter, Caroline Benoît, who married General François Perrier in 1872.

Justin Benoit was an active and life-long member of the Reformed Church of Montpellier. He was elected to the Presbyteral Council of the Temple in rue Maguelone, of which he was secretary from 1874 to 1881.

== Professional life ==
After being appointed by competitive examination as a student of the “École pratique d'anatomie et de médecine opératoire” (Practical School of Anatomy and Operative Medicine) and after spending seventeen months as a hospital student (“Externe”) in the hospitals of Montpellier, he became an intern at the hospital of Nîmes in 1835. On 20 December 1836, he became an intern at the Montpellier Hospitals and then at the Saint-Eloi Hospital.

Doctor of Medicine in April 1839, he was admitted to the agrégation of the surgical section in 1844 after submitting his first aggregation thesis on 27 December 1842. That same year, he became a practitioner in the “Œuvre de la Miséricorde” in Montpellier, he also took charge of the medical service of the garrisons of Nîmes and then Montpellier.

He was curator of the anatomy collections of the Faculty of Medicine of Montpellier from 1850 to 1853. In 1851 he inaugurated the new buildings of the present Anatomical Museum.

At the Faculty of Medicine, he served as a substitute, then obtained the chair of anatomy in 1853. He held this position until his retirement in November 1886. During the Crimean War (1853-1856) he was head of the military ambulance service. In 1880, he was elected dean of the faculty for five years and advocated moving the former St. Eloi Hospital out of the city.

Retired in 1886, he died on 6 November 1893. He was buried in the Protestant cemetery of Montpellier.

== Works ==
- Mémoires de médecine et chirurgie cliniques available at Gallica (1850).
- Des principes qui doivent diriger dans l'étude et l'enseignement de l'anatomie humaine available at Gallica (1852)
- Autoplastie de la main.
- Traité de l'angine laryngée oedémateuse.
- Consultation sur un cas d'hermaphrodisme.
- De l'Efficacité du traitement arabique dans les syphilis invétérées et dans plusieurs autres maladies diathétiques rebelles.
- De l'emploi thérapeutique du nitrate d'argent, et spécialement de l'emploi de cette substance dans les maladies.
- De l'influence de l'air et des aliments dans le traitement des maladies chirurgicales.
- De l'Insalubrité de l'hôpital Saint-Éloi de Montpellier, de la nécessité de le remplacer par un hôpital offrant de meilleures conditions hygiéniques (Extract from the report presented to the Academic Council of Montpellier, 29 November 1880).

== Distinctions ==
- Officer of the Legion of Honour (30 March 1885)
- Officer of the Brazilian Order of the Rose (20 July 1872)
- Officer of the Ordre des Palmes académiques
- Member of the Académie des sciences et lettres de Montpellier from 1847.
- Member of the Reial Acadèmia de Medicina de Catalunya to which he sent many works.

== Legacy ==
- A street bears his name in Millau : impasse Doyen Justin Benoît. (44°05′34″N 3°03′12″E)
- The painter Édouard-Antoine Marsal made a portrait of him
