= 1862 in science =

The year 1862 in science and technology involved some significant events, listed below.

== Astronomy ==
- January 31 – Alvan Graham Clark makes the first observation of Sirius B, a white dwarf star, through an eighteen-inch telescope at Northwestern University in Illinois.

== Biology ==
- May 15 – Charles Darwin publishes On the various contrivances by which British and foreign Orchids are fertilised by insects, and on the good effects of intercrossing.
- Henry Walter Bates publishes "Contributions to an insect fauna of the Amazon valley. Lepidoptera: Heliconidae" describing Batesian mimicry.
- George Bentham and Joseph Dalton Hooker begin publication of Genera plantarum based on the collections of the Royal Botanic Gardens, Kew, England.
- John Gwyn Jeffreys begins publication of British Conchology, or an account of the Mollusca which now inhabit the British Isles and the surrounding seas.

== Chemistry ==
- Chemist and composer Alexander Borodin describes the first nucleophilic displacement of chlorine by fluorine in benzoyl chloride.
- Mineralogist Alexandre-Emile Béguyer de Chancourtois makes the first proposal to arrange the chemical elements in order of atomic weights, although this is largely ignored by chemists.
- Alexander Parkes exhibits Parkesine, one of the earliest synthetic polymers, at the International Exhibition in London. This discovery forms the foundation of the modern plastics industry.

== Earth sciences ==
- Friedrich Albert Fallou publishes "Pedologie oder allgemeine und besondere Bodenkunde" (Pedology or general and special soil science), founding soil science.

== Medicine ==
- Maurice Raynaud describes the vasospastic syndrome named after him in his doctoral dissertation.
- Hermann Snellen publishes the Snellen chart for testing visual acuity.

== Paleontology ==
- November 20 – Richard Owen first describes a fossilised bird, Archaeopteryx, to the Royal Society of London.

== Technology ==
- July 8 – Theodore Timby is granted a United States patent for discharging guns in a revolving turret, using electricity.
- July 22 – Henry O. Peabody is granted a United States patent for the Peabody action for rifles.
- November 4 – Richard Jordan Gatling is granted a United States patent for the Gatling gun.
- Brown & Sharpe produce the first Universal Milling machine.
- David Kirkaldy publishes Results of an Experimental Inquiry into the Comparative Tensile Strength and other properties of various kinds of Wrought-Iron and Steel in Glasgow describing his pioneering work in tensile testing.

== Awards ==
- Copley Medal: Thomas Graham
- Wollaston Medal for geology: Robert Godwin-Austen

== Births ==
- January 23 – David Hilbert (died 1943), German mathematician
- February 14 – Agnes Pockels (died 1935), German chemist (in Venice)
- March 14 – Vilhelm Bjerknes (died 1951), Norwegian physicist and meteorologist
- May 27 – John Edward Campbell (died 1924), Irish-born mathematician
- June 7 – Philipp Lenard (died 1947), German physicist
- June 9 – Ernest William Moir (died 1933), British civil engineer
- July 2 – William Henry Bragg (died 1942), English winner of the 1915 Nobel Prize in Physics
- August 2 – Paul Bujor (died 1952), Romanian animal morphologist, politician and short story writer
- October 12 – Theodor Boveri (died 1915), German geneticist
- October 19 – Auguste Lumière (died 1954), French inventor, film pioneer
- November 23 - Ernest Guglielminetti (died 1943), Swiss physician
- William Hoskins (died 1934), American inventor

== Deaths ==
- January 10 – Samuel Colt (born 1814), American inventor
- February 3 – Jean-Baptiste Biot (born 1774), French physicist
- February 7 – Prosper Ménière (born 1799), French physician who first described the symptoms of Ménière's disease
- February 11 – Luther V. Bell (born 1806), American psychiatric physician
- March 1 – Peter Barlow (born 1776), English mathematician
- April 3 – Sir James Clark Ross (born 1800), English explorer of the Polar regions
- May 6 – Olry Terquem (born 1782), French Jewish geometer
- October 8 – James Walker (born 1781), Scottish-born civil engineer
- October 21 – Sir Benjamin Collins Brodie, 1st Baronet (born 1783), English physiologist
- December 18 – Lucas Barrett (born 1837), English naturalist (drowned)
- December 20 – Robert Knox (born 1791), Scottish anatomist
- December 21 – Karl Kreil (born 1798), Austrian astronomer
