= 1875 in science =

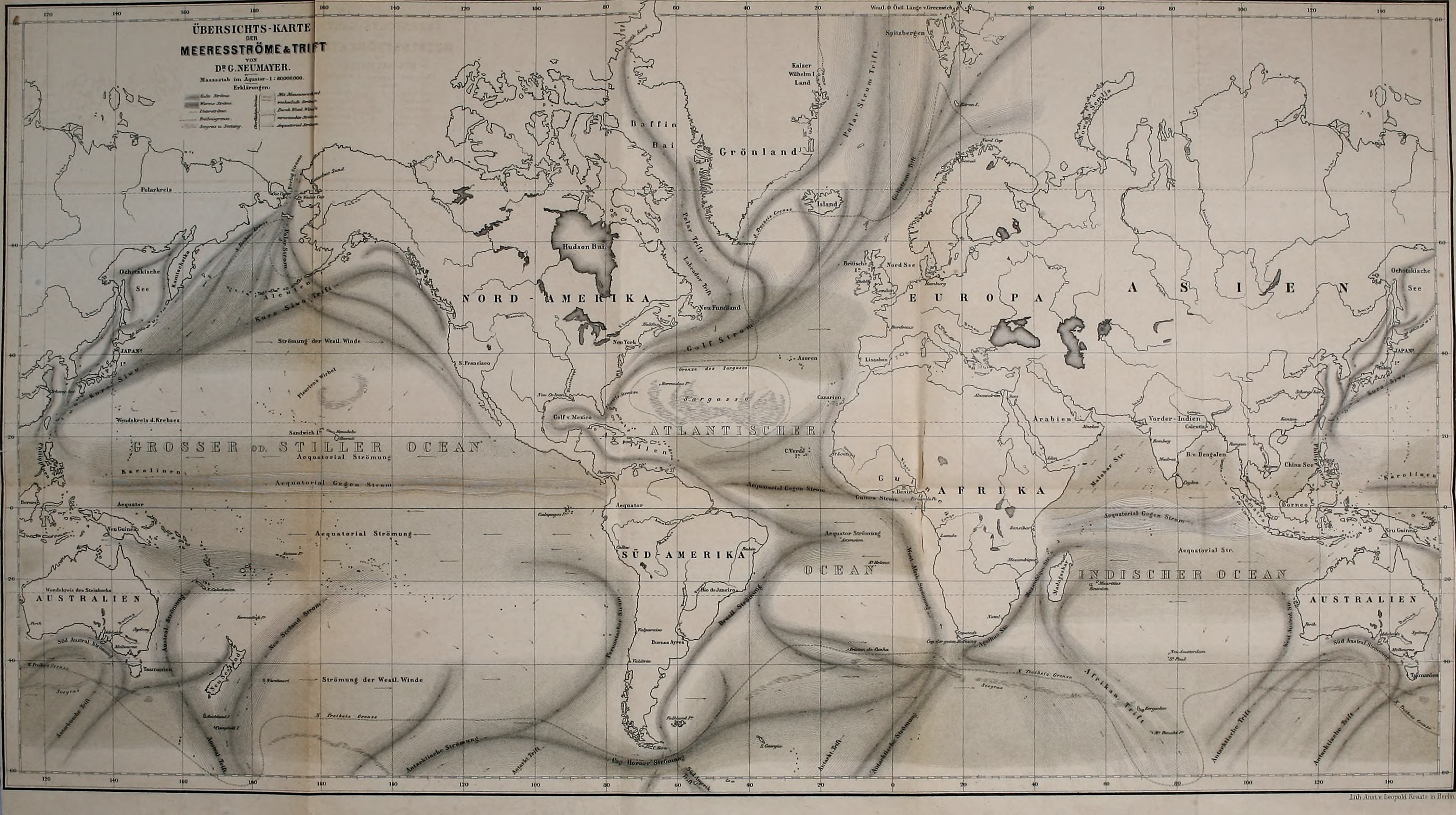
Map from Georg Balthasar von Neumayer’s 1875 treatise on scientific observations during naval expeditions, titled “Anleitung zu wissenschaftlichen Beobachtungen auf Reisen.“

The year 1875 in science and technology involved some significant events, listed below.

== Chemistry ==
- Gallium is discovered spectroscopically by French chemist Paul Emile Lecoq de Boisbaudran. Later in this year he obtains the free metal by electrolysis of its hydroxide and names it. This is the first of Dmitri Mendeleev's predicted elements to be identified.
- Phenylhydrazine is discovered by Hermann Emil Fischer.
- Swiss chocolatier Daniel Peter working with Henri Nestlé's company perfects a method of manufacturing milk chocolate using condensed milk.

== Earth sciences ==
- March 23 – Challenger expedition first records Challenger Deep.

== Genetics ==
- Francis Galton publishes The History of Twins, as a criterion of the relative powers of nature and nurture.

== Medicine ==
- March 1 – The Hospital for Sick Children (Toronto) is founded in Canada.
- The weekly medical journal, Deutsche Medizinische Wochenschrift, is established in Germany by Paul Börner.

== Metrology ==
- May 20 – International Bureau of Weights and Measures established by signature of the Metre Convention in Paris.

== Awards ==
- Copley Medal: August Wilhelm Hofmann
- Wollaston Medal for geology: Laurent-Guillaume de Koninck

== Births ==
- January 10 – Issai Schur (died 1941), Belarusian-born Jewish mathematician
- January 14 – Albert Schweitzer (died 1965), German-born French medical missionary
- February 4 – Ludwig Prandtl (died 1953), German physicist
- March 14 – Fran Jesenko (died 1932), Slovene botanist and plant geneticist
- June 20 – Reginald Punnett (died 1967), English geneticist
- June 28 – Henri Lebesgue (died 1941), French mathematician
- July 26 – Carl Jung (died 1961), Swiss psychiatrist
- September 11 – Edith Humphrey (died 1978), English chemist
- October 23 – Gilbert N. Lewis (died 1946), American chemist; first to isolate deuterium
- November 12 – Stanislaus von Prowazek, born Stanislav Provázek (died 1915), Bohemian parasitologist

== Deaths ==
- February 22 – Charles Lyell (born 1797), Scottish-born geologist
- February 28 – Robert Willis, English mechanical engineer, phonetician and architectural historian (born 1800)
- March 7 – John Edward Gray (born 1800), English taxonomist
- March 31 – Friedrich Julius Richelot (born 1808), German mathematician
- April 11 – Heinrich Schwabe (born 1789), German astronomer
- October 2 – Petrache Poenaru (died 1799), Romanian inventor
- October 19 – Charles Wheatstone (born 1802), English inventor
- November 27 – Richard Carrington (born 1826), English astronomer
