= 1868 in science =

The year 1868 in science and technology involved some significant events, listed below.

== Biology ==
- January 30 – Publication of Charles Darwin's The Variation of Animals and Plants Under Domestication (by John Murray in London), including his theory of heredity, which he calls pangenesis.
- Jules-Emile Planchon and colleagues propose Phylloxera as the cause of the Great French Wine Blight.
- Roland Trimen reads a paper to the Linnaean Society explaining Batesian mimicry in African butterflies.
- T. H. Huxley discovers what he thinks is primordial matter and names it Bathybius haeckelii. He admits his mistake in 1871.
- The Granny Smith apple cultivar originates in Eastwood, New South Wales, Australia, from a chance seedling propagated by Maria Ann Smith (née Sherwood, 1799–1870).

== Chemistry ==
- August 18 – The element later named as helium is first detected in the spectrum of the Sun's chromosphere by French astronomer Jules Janssen during a total eclipse in Guntur, India, but assumed to be sodium.
- October 20 – English astronomer Norman Lockyer observes and names the D_{3} Fraunhofer line in the solar spectrum and concludes that it is caused by a hitherto unidentified element which he later names helium.
- Louis Arthur Ducos du Hauron patents methods of color photography.

== Medicine ==
- Jean-Martin Charcot describes and names multiple sclerosis.
- Adolph Kussmaul performs the first esophagogastroduodenoscopy on a living human.

== Paleontology ==
- March – French geologist Louis Lartet discovers the first identified skeletons of Cro-Magnon, the first anatomically modern humans (early Homo sapiens sapiens), at Abri de Crô-Magnon, a rock shelter at Les Eyzies, Dordogne, France.

== Technology ==
- June 23 – The Sholes and Glidden typewriter is patented in the United States.
- October 28 – American inventor Thomas Edison applies for his first patent, for a form of electronic voting machine.
- Ernest and Auguste Bollée first patent the Éolienne Bollée wind turbine in France.
- Scottish physicist James Clerk Maxwell's paper on governors is a landmark in the mathematics of feedback and in control theory.
- Pendulum-and-hydrostat control for the Whitehead torpedo developed by Robert Whitehead.

== Awards ==
- Copley Medal: Charles Wheatstone
- Wollaston Medal for Geology: Carl Friedrich Naumann

== Births ==
- January 9 – S. P. L. Sørensen (died 1939), Danish chemist.
- January 31 – Theodore William Richards (died 1928), American chemist, recipient of Nobel Prize in Chemistry.
- February 7 – Aleen Cust (died 1937), Anglo-Irish veterinary surgeon.
- March 15 – Grace Chisholm Young (died 1944), English mathematician.
- March 22 – Robert Andrews Millikan (died 1953), American physicist, recipient of Nobel Prize in Physics.
- April 4
  - Philippa Fawcett (died 1948), English mathematician.
  - Henrietta Swan Leavitt (died 1921), American astronomer
- April 5 – Percy Furnivall (died 1938), English surgeon.
- April 8 – Herbert Spencer Jennings (died 1947), American zoologist.
- April 14 – Annie S. D. Maunder, née Russell (died 1947), Irish astronomer.
- April 28 – Georgy Voronoy (died 1908), Ukrainian mathematician.
- April 30 – J. B. Christopherson (died 1955), English physician.
- May 2 – Robert W. Wood (died 1955), American optical physicist.
- June 6 – Robert Falcon Scott (died 1912), English explorer.
- June 7 – John Sealy Townsend (died 1957), Irish mathematical physicist.
- June 14 – Karl Landsteiner (died 1943), Austrian physiologist.
- July 4 – Henrietta Swan Leavitt (died 1921), American astronomer.
- October 23 – Frederick W. Lanchester (died 1946), English automotive engineer.
- November 8 – Felix Hausdorff (died 1942), German mathematician.
- November 14 – Karl Landsteiner (died 1943), Austrian-born physiologist, recipient of Nobel Prize in Physiology or Medicine.
- November 15 – Emil Racoviță (died 1947), Romanian biologist, speleologist and explorer.
- November 17 – Korbinian Brodmann (died 1918), German neurologist.
- December 5 – Arnold Sommerfeld (died 1951), German theoretical physicist.
- December 9 – Fritz Haber (died 1934), German chemist.

== Deaths ==
- February 10 – Sir David Brewster, Scottish physicist (born 1781)
- February 11 – Léon Foucault (born 1819), French physicist.
- February 24 – John Herapath (born 1790), English physicist.
- May 22 – Julius Plücker (born 1801), German mathematician and physicist.
- June 25 – Alexander Mitchell (born 1780), Irish engineer and inventor of the screw-pile lighthouse.
- June 29 – Sir John Lillie, British army officer, entrepreneur and inventor (born 1790)
- July 15 – William T. G. Morton (born 1819), American dentist.
- August 29 – Christian Friedrich Schönbein, German chemist and inventor of the fuel cell (born 1799)
- September 26 – August Ferdinand Möbius (born 1790), German mathematician and astronomer
- December 25 – Linus Yale, Jr. (born 1821), American engineer and inventor.
- December 31 – James David Forbes (born 1809), Scottish-born physicist, glaciologist and seismologist.
