= 18th century in paleontology =

Paleontology or palaeontology is the study of prehistoric life forms on Earth through the examination of plant and animal fossils. This includes the study of body fossils, tracks (ichnites), burrows, cast-off parts, fossilised feces (coprolites), palynomorphs and chemical residues. Because humans have encountered fossils for millennia, paleontology has a long history both before and after becoming formalized as a science. This article records significant discoveries and events related to paleontology that occurred or were published in the 18th century.

== 1705 ==
- A paper by Robert Hooke is formally published posthumously. Its contents had originally been part of an earlier presentation to the Royal Society of London. This paper provided an argument against prevailing wisdom and advocated the idea that fossils were the remains of actual once-living organisms. Still, it was not enough to change the general consensus of his contemporaries in the scientific community.
- In the second edition of an earlier book (published in 1677), Robert Plot concludes that fossils (which he referred to as "lapides sui generis") were not the remains of once-living organisms, but were stones made to look like organisms by some unknown force of nature, instituted by God to decorate the inner parts of the Earth, in the way flowers beautify its surface.

== 1728 ==
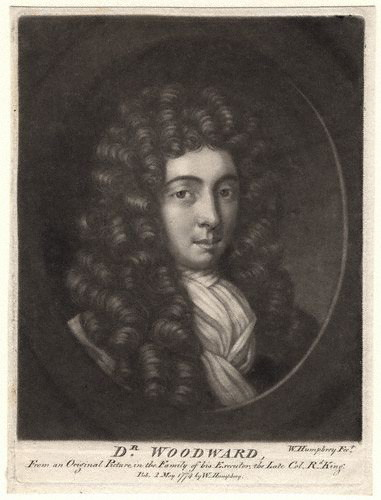
The naturalist John Woodward had an extensive fossil collection

- A catalogue of the large fossil collection belonging to Gresham College professor John Woodward is published posthumously. This catalogue contains fragments of dinosaur bone that may have belonged to a megalosaur. Because these specimens have been preserved in the Sedgwick Museum, they are the oldest identifiably dinosaur fossil discovery whose location is still known.

== 1755 ==
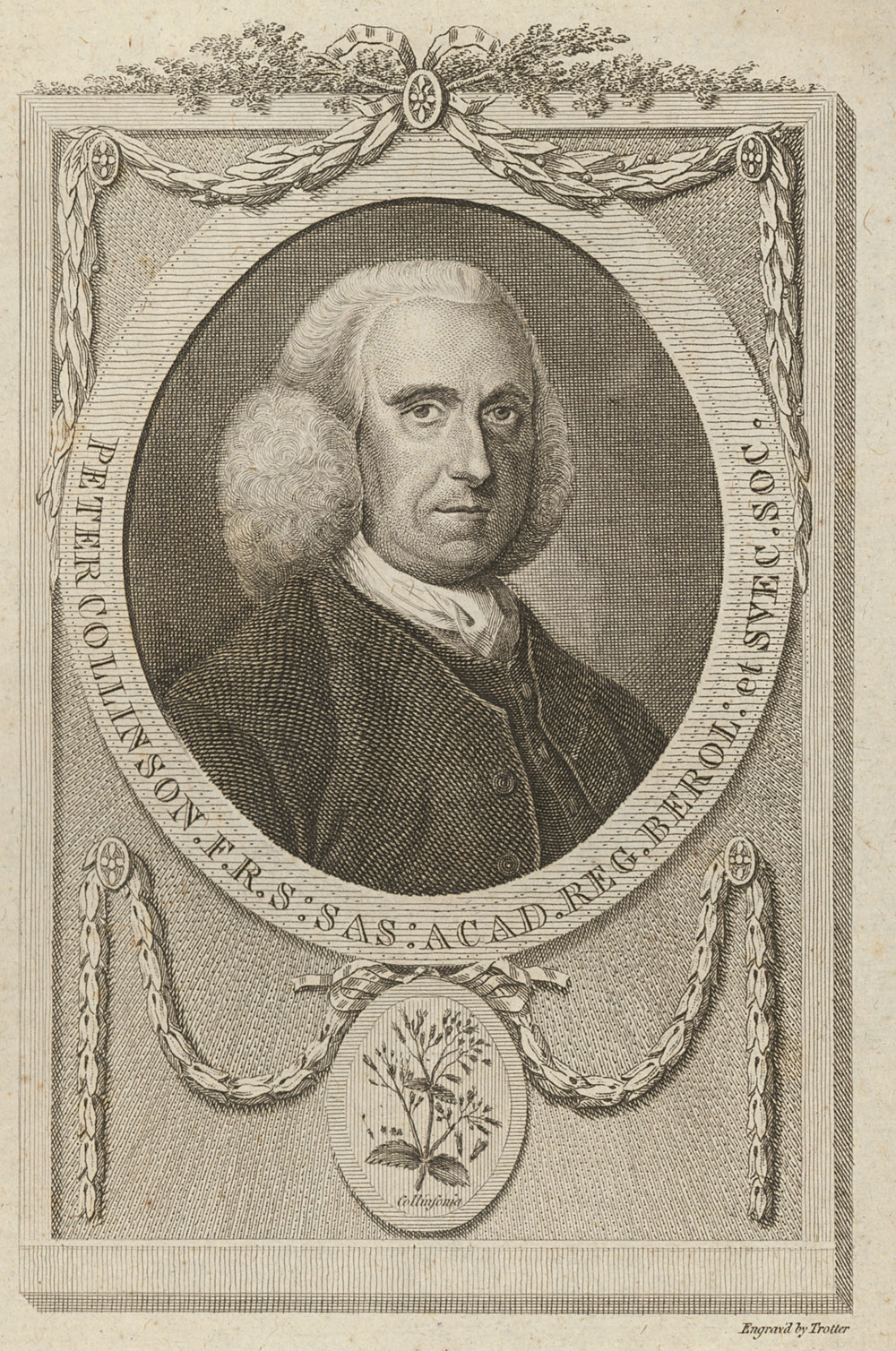
Peter Collinson

- Joshua Platt, a dealer in curiosities, discovers three large dinosaurian vertebrae at Stonesfield. He sends them off for examination to a Quaker botanist, merchant, and friend of Benjamin Franklin named Peter Collinson, who never gives them Platt's desired examination, and the fate and specific identity of the fossils remain unknown.

== 1758 ==
- Platt continued prospecting for fossils in Stonesfield. He met with success, finding an incomplete Megalosaurus thigh bone, which he noted and illustrated. This bone was included in the 1773 catalogue of his large personal fossil collection.

== 1763 ==
- The end of a Megalosaurus thighbone, previously misinterpreted by Robert Plot to be the remains of a war elephant brought to Great Britain by the Romans, is subject to further confusion. Richard Brookes publishes a paper naming it Scrotum humanum. Although he meant this name metaphorically to describe the bone's appearance, this idea is taken seriously by French philosopher Jean-Baptiste Robinet, who believed that nature formed fossils in mimicry of portions of the human anatomy- such as the scrotum.

== 1769 ==
- Georges Cuvier is born.

== 1773 ==
- A unpublished catalogue of the fossil collection belonging to curiosity dealer Joshua Platt is compiled. A notable inclusion was a partial Megalosaurus thigh bone that Platt discovered in 1758. However, this fossil has been lost.

== 1776 ==
- The French naturalist Abbé Dicquemare discovers and briefly describes (without illustrating) large bones discovered in the Normandy Coast's Vaches Noires Cliffs. Paleontologist Philippe Taquet has suggested that these bones were probably dinosaurian.

== 1778 ==
- Near Maastricht, the first Mosasaurus is discovered.

== 1784 ==
- William Buckland, a polymath who was the first person to scientifically describe a dinosaur, is born.
- Cosimo Alessandro Collini, keeper of the natural history collections of Mannheim, reported the skeleton of an unusual animal to the scientific literature. It had strange arms that could have supported a membrane like that of a bat's wing, yet it was preserved in rocks characterized by fossil of marine life. Based on these associations, he tentatively concluded that the animal was aquatic. This fossil would be named Pterodactylus in 1809.

== 1787 ==
- A fossil bone recovered from Cretaceous strata at Woodbury, New Jersey is discussed by the American Philosophical Society in Philadelphia. The remains were only retrospectively identified as dinosaurian, as dinosaurs would not be scientifically recognized as a distinct group of reptiles until Sir Richard Owen presented his treatise on British fossil reptiles to the British Association in August of 1841.

== 1789 ==
=== Newly named taxa ===
| Name | Novelty | Status | Authors | Age | Type locality | Location | Notes | Images |
|---|---|---|---|---|---|---|---|---|
| Orthoceras | Gen. nov. | Valid | Bruguière | Ordovician | | | Genus of nautiloid cephalopods | |

== 1790 ==
- Gideon Mantell, the scientist who first described an herbivorous dinosaur, is born.

== 1794 ==
- French paleontologist Jacques Amand Eudes-Deslongchamps is born.
- Ursus spelaeus, the Cave Bear, is described.

== 1796 ==
=== Newly named taxa ===
| Name | Novelty | Status | Authors | Age | Type locality | Location | Notes | Images |
|---|---|---|---|---|---|---|---|---|
| Megatherium americanum | Gen. et sp. nov. | Valid | Cuvier | Pleistocene | Lujan River | Argentina | A large extinct ground sloth | |

=== Research ===
- The skeleton named Megatherium by Cuvier is described at the same time by Garriga.

== 1799 ==
=== Newly named taxa ===
| Name | Novelty | Status | Authors | Age | Type locality | Location | Notes | Images |
|---|---|---|---|---|---|---|---|---|
| Baculites | Gen. nov. | Valid | Lamarck | Cretaceous - Paleogene | Maastricht | Netherlands | Genus of ammonite | |
| Mammut | Gen. nov. | Valid | Blumenbach | Miocene - Pleistocene | Big Bone Lick | United States | Genus of proboscidean | |
| Megalonyx | Gen. nov. | Valid | Jefferson | Pliocene - Pleistocene | Greenbrier County | United States | Genus of ground sloth | |
