= 1801 in paleontology =

Paleontology or palaeontology is the study of prehistoric life forms on Earth through the examination of plant and animal fossils. This includes the study of body fossils, tracks (ichnites), burrows, cast-off parts, fossilised feces (coprolites), palynomorphs and chemical residues. Because humans have encountered fossils for millennia, paleontology has a long history both before and after becoming formalized as a science. This article records significant discoveries and events related to paleontology that occurred or were published in the year 1801.

== Reptiles ==
- French anatomist Georges Cuvier restudied a bizarre fossil illustrated by Collini. He reinterpreted its forelimbs as wings and deemed it a flying reptile. This fossil would be named Pterodactylus in 1809.

== Paleontologists ==
- Birth of German paleontologist Christian Erich Hermann von Meyer
