= 1873 in science =

The year 1873 in science and technology involved some significant events, listed below.

== Chemistry ==
- Jacobus Henricus van 't Hoff and Joseph Achille Le Bel, working independently, develop a model of chemical bonding that explains the chirality experiments of Pasteur and provides a physical cause for optical activity in chiral compounds

== Exploration ==
- The Austro-Hungarian North Pole Expedition discovers Franz-Josef Land

== Mathematics ==
- Charles Hermite proves that the mathematical constant e is a transcendental number
- Henri Brocard introduces the Brocard points, Brocard triangle and Brocard circle

== Meteorology ==
- September 15 – agreement for establishment of the International Meteorological Organization.

== Physics ==
- February 20 – English electrical engineer Willoughby Smith publishes his discovery of the photoconductivity of the element selenium
- June 14 – Johannes Diderik van der Waals defends his thesis, Over de Continuiteit van den Gas en Vloeistoftoestand (On the continuity of the gaseous and liquid state) at Leiden University; in this, he introduces the concepts of molecular volume and molecular attraction; gives a semi-quantitative description of the phenomena of condensation and critical temperatures; and derives the van der Waals equation
- September 22 – James Clerk Maxwell delivers a discourse on molecules to the British Association for the Advancement of Science meeting in Bradford
- December – J. Willard Gibbs describes the principle of Gibbs free energy
- James Clerk Maxwell's A Treatise on Electricity and Magnetism first presents the partial differential equations known as Maxwell's equations which form the foundation of classical electrodynamics, optics and electric circuits
- Frederick Guthrie is the first to report observing thermionic emission

== Physiology and medicine ==
- June 18 – Alice Vickery passes the Royal Pharmaceutical Society's examination, becoming the first qualified female pharmacist in the United Kingdom
- Mycobacterium leprae, the causative agent of leprosy, is discovered by Norwegian physician Gerhard Armauer Hansen. It is the first bacterium to be identified as pathogenic in humans
- English allergist Charles Harrison Blackley publishes Experimental Researches on the Causes and Nature of Catarrhus aestivus
- Camillo Golgi first publishes a demonstration of Golgi's method

== Technology ==
- May 20 – Jacob W. Davis and Levi Strauss receive United States patent 139121 for using copper rivets to strengthen the pockets of denim jeans
- Carl von Linde installs his first commercial refrigeration system, built by Maschinenfabrik Augsburg for the Spaten Brewery and using dimethyl ether as the refrigerant
- Christopher Miner Spencer introduces the fully automatic turret lathe

== Awards ==
- Copley Medal: Hermann Helmholtz
- Wollaston Medal for geology: Philip de Malpas Grey Egerton

== Births ==
- February 11 – Louis Charles Christopher Krieger (died 1940), American mycologist
- February 12 – Barnum Brown (died 1963), American paleontologist
- March 5 – Thomas Harrison Montgomery, Jr. (died 1912), American zoologist and cell biologist
- April 25 – Félix d'Herelle (died 1949), French-Canadian microbiologist, a co-discoverer of bacteriophages
- June 28 – Alexis Carrel (died 1942), French surgeon, biologist and winner of a Nobel Prize in Physiology or Medicine
- June 30 – Friedrich Karl Georg Fedde (died 1942), German botanist
- July 7 – Sándor Ferenczi (died 1933), Hungarian psychoanalyst
- October 4 – Dimitrie Pompeiu (died 1954), Romanian mathematician
- October 9 – Karl Schwarzschild (died 1916), German astronomer and physicist

== Deaths ==
- January 27 – Adam Sedgwick (born 1785), English geologist
- February 1 – Matthew Fontaine Maury (born 1806), American oceanographer
- April 18 – Justus von Liebig (born 1803), German chemist
- March 10 – John Torrey (born 1796), American botanist
- March 30 – Bénédict Morel (born 1809), French psychiatrist
- September 15 – Alexei Pavlovich Fedchenko (born 1844), Russian naturalist
- September 24 – John Thurnam (born 1810), English psychiatrist and ethnologist
- October 17 – Robert McClure (born 1807), British Arctic explorer
- December 14 – Louis Agassiz (born 1807), Swiss-American zoologist and geologist
