= 1800 in science =

The year 1800 in science and technology included many significant events.

== Events ==
- January 13 – Royal Institution of Great Britain granted a royal charter.

== Astronomy ==
- The central star of the Ring Nebula is discovered by Friedrich von Hahn: the central star is a white dwarf star with a temperature of between 100,000 and 120,000 K.

== Chemistry ==
- Beryllium is discovered by Johann Bartholomäus Trommsdorff in beryl from Saxony, a new earth; he calls it Agusterde ("August Earth").
- Fulminates are discovered by Edward Howard.
- Antoine François, comte de Fourcroy, begins publication in Paris of the comprehensive chemistry textbook Système des connaissances chimiques et de leurs applications aux phénomènes de la nature et de l'art.

== Earth sciences ==
- October – Volcanic eruption of Mount Guntur in West Java.

== Exploration ==
- The Antipodes Islands, at this time the home of large herds of fur seals, are discovered by the crew of the British ship HMS Reliance.
- Jacques Labillardière publishes Relation du Voyage à la Recherche de la Pérouse in Paris.

== Medicine ==
- March 22 – Company of Surgeons granted a royal charter to become the Royal College of Surgeons in London.
- September – Philippe Pinel publishes Traité médico-philosophique sur l'aliénation mentale ou la manie (Medical and philosophical Treatise on insanity or mania) which marks the beginning of an in-depth change in the approaches and methods of work with "lunatics".
- Xavier Bichat publishes Traité sur les membranes and Recherches physiologiques sur la vie et la mort, pioneering texts in histology and pathology.
- Andrea Vaccà Berlinghieri publishes Traité des maladies vénériennes (Treatise on venereal diseases).
- Georges Cuvier begins publishing his Leçons d'anatomie comparée (5 volumes, 1800-1805).

== Paleontology ==
- Cuvier publishes a brief description of the pterodactyl.

== Physics ==
- Alessandro Volta devises the first chemical battery, thereby founding the discipline of electrochemistry.
- Infrared rays are discovered by William Herschel, an English astronomer of German origin.

== Technology ==
- Yeast is discovered as a new way to make beer ferment (beer made before 1800 was lambic).
- Robert Fulton builds a practical experimental manually-propelled naval submarine Nautilus in France (first test dive July 29 at Rouen).
- Henry Maudslay develops the first industrially practical screw-cutting lathe, allowing standardisation of screw thread sizes for the first time, in London.
- The first design for a cast iron twin leaf swing bridge is produced by Ralph Walker for London Docks.

== Zoology ==
- November 4 – Major-General Thomas Davies first describes the superb lyrebird.

== Awards ==
- Copley Medal: Edward Charles Howard

== Births ==
- January 14 – Ludwig von Köchel, Austrian musicologist and botanist (died 1877)
- February 11 – H. Fox Talbot, English pioneer of photography (died 1877)
- February 12 – John Edward Gray, English taxonomist (died 1875)
- February 23 – William Jardine, Scottish naturalist (died 1874)
- February 27 – Robert Willis, English mechanical engineer, phonetician and architectural historian (died 1875)
- March 3 – Heinrich Georg Bronn, German geologist, paleontologist (died 1862)
- March 14 – James Bogardus, American inventor (died 1874)
- April 15 – James Clark Ross, English explorer of the Polar regions (died 1862)
- May 25 – Leonard Jenyns, English natural historian (died 1893)
- July 31 – Friedrich Woehler, German chemist (died 1882)
- August 26 – Félix Archimède Pouchet, French natural scientist (died 1872)
- August 20 – Bernhard Heine, German physician, bone specialist and inventor (died 1846)
- September 22 – George Bentham, English botanist (died 1884)
- October 23 – Henri Milne-Edwards, French zoologist (died 1885)
- December 25 – John Phillips, English geologist (died 1874)
- December 29 – Charles Goodyear, American inventor of the vulcanization process (died 1860)
- Anna Volkova, Russian chemist (died 1876)

== Deaths ==
- January 1 – Louis-Jean-Marie Daubenton, French naturalist (born 1716)
- January 16 – Johann Christian Wiegleb, German chemist (born 1732)
- March 14 – Daines Barrington, English naturalist (born 1727)
- March 29 – Marc René, marquis de Montalembert, French military engineer (born 1714)
- May 23 – Henry Cort, English ironmaster (born 1740)
- June 20 – Abraham Gotthelf Kästner, German mathematician (born 1719)
- July 14 – Lorenzo Mascheroni, Italian mathematician (born 1750)
- September 10 – Johann David Schoepff, German naturalist and physician (born 1752)
- October 4 – Johann Hermann, German physician, naturalist (born 1738)
- November 5 – Jesse Ramsden, English scientific instrument maker (born 1735)
- December – Jean-Baptiste Audebert, French natural history painter (born 1752)
- December 30 – Thomas Dimsdale, English physician, banker and politician, pioneer of variolation (born 1712)
