= 1812 in science =

The year 1812 in science and technology involved some significant events, listed below.

== Chemistry ==
- Humphry Davy publishes Elements of Chemical Philosophy in London.
- John Davy first describes the synthesis of phosgene.
- Friedrich Mohs introduces his system of classifying minerals and his scale of mineral hardness.
- Heinrich Vogel (1778–1867) recognizes that glucose is a product of hydrolyzing lactose.

== Geophysics ==
- February 7 – The last New Madrid earthquake strikes New Madrid, Missouri, with an estimated moment magnitude of over 8.
- March 26 – An earthquake destroys Caracas, Venezuela.

== Mathematics, statistics and metrology ==
- February 11 – Massachusetts governor Elbridge Gerry invents gerrymandering.
- February 12 – Napoleon authorises the usage of Mesures usuelles, the basis of the Metric System.
- Pierre-Simon Laplace publishes Théorie analytique des probabilités in which he lays down many fundamental results in statistics.

== Medicine ==
- January – The New England Journal of Medicine is founded in Boston, by Dr John Collins Warren as the New England Journal of Medicine and Surgery and the Collateral Branches of Medical Science.
- January 21 – John Parkinson and his father James first describe appendicitis and resultant peritonitis in English.
- Benjamin Rush publishes Medical Inquiries and Observations upon the Diseases of the Mind in Philadelphia, the first textbook on psychiatry issued in the United States.
- James Barry qualifies as a medical doctor at the University of Edinburgh; born Margaret Ann Bulkley, this makes her the first British woman with such a qualification.
- Cholera in Jessore, India.
- Coffee is banned in Sweden.

== Paleontology ==
- Samuel Thomas von Sömmerring publishes his description of Pterodactylus which he names Ornithocephalus antiquus.
- Georges Cuvier publishes Recherches sur les ossements fossiles de quadrupèdes in Paris.

== Technology ==
- February 27 – British poet Lord Byron gives his first address as a member of the House of Lords, in defense of Luddite violence against Industrialism in his home county of Nottinghamshire.
- March 15 – Luddites attack the wool factory of Frank Vickerman in West Yorkshire, England.
- May 25 – Felling mine disaster: Coal mine explosion at Felling colliery near Jarrow, England – 96 dead. In the aftermath, physician William Reid Clanny invents a miners' safety lamp.
- August – Henry Bell's PS Comet begins a passenger service on the River Clyde in Scotland, the first commercially successful steamboat service in Europe.
- August 12 – The Middleton Railway, serving coal pits at Leeds in England, becomes the first to use steam locomotives successfully in regular service. The first locomotive, Salamanca, is also the first to use two cylinders and has a rack railway mechanism devised by John Blenkinsop and built by Matthew Murray.
- August 19 – War of 1812: USS Constitution defeats the British frigate Guerriere off the coast of Nova Scotia. British shot is said to have bounced off Constitution's sides, earning her the nickname "Old Ironsides".
- Philippe Girard invents a flax-spinning machine.
- The Old Oscar Pepper Distillery (the modern-day Labrot & Graham Distillery), the oldest Kentucky Bourbon whiskey distillery, is established along Glenn's Creek in Woodford County, Kentucky.

== Awards ==
- Copley Medal: Not awarded
- Humphry Davy receives a knighthood

== Births ==
- March 12 – Joseph Prestwich, English geologist (died 1896)
- March 20 – Charles Vincent Walker, English telegraph engineer (died 1882)
- March 24 – Robert Gordon Latham, English ethnologist and philologist (died 1888)
- May 10 – William Henry Barlow, English railway civil engineer (died 1902)
- June 9 – Johann Gottfried Galle, German astronomer (died 1910)
- September 12 – Richard March Hoe, American inventor (died 1886)
- October 27 – Abraham Dee Bartlett, English zoologist (died 1897)

== Deaths ==
- February 24 – Étienne-Louis Malus, French physicist (born 1775)
- April 7 – Robert Willan, English dermatologist (born 1757)
- May 9 – Charles-Nicolas-Sigisbert Sonnini de Manoncourt, French naturalist (born 1751)
- June 22 – Richard Kirwan, Irish scientist (born 1733)
- July 10 – Carl Ludwig Willdenow, German botanist (born 1765)
