= 1808 in science =

The year 1808 in science and technology involved some significant events, listed below.

== Astronomy ==
- December 9 (20:34 UTC) – Mercury occults Saturn (not known at this time).

== Chemistry ==
- Barium, calcium, magnesium, and strontium isolated by Humphry Davy.
- Joseph Louis Gay-Lussac formulates the law of combining volumes for gases.
- John Dalton begins publication of A New System of Chemical Philosophy, explaining his atomic theory of chemistry and including a list of atomic weights.
- Jöns Jakob Berzelius publishes Lärbok i Kemien in which he proposes modern chemical symbols and notation, and of the concept of relative atomic weight.

== Mathematics ==
- French mathematician Christian Kramp introduces the notation n! in factorials.
- German mathematician Carl Friedrich Gauss publishes Theorematis arithmetici demonstratio nova, introducing Gauss's lemma in the third proof of quadratic reciprocity.
- Irish American mathematician Robert Adrain produces a formulation of the method of least squares.

== Medicine ==
- The term psychiatry is coined (as psychiatrie) by German physician Johann Christian Reil.
- The early medical journal Bibliotek for Læger begins publication in Denmark.

== Natural history ==
- January 12 – Organizational meeting leading to creation of the Wernerian Natural History Society is held in Edinburgh.
- Alexander von Humboldt publishes his Ansichten der Natur.

== Technology ==
- February 11 – Anthracite coal is first burned as fuel by Jesse Fell in Wilkes-Barre, Pennsylvania; the discovery leads to the use of coal as a key fuel source of the Industrial Revolution in the United States.
- August 24 – William Congreve patents the Congreve clock with a rolling ball regulator.
- Bryan Donkin patents a steel nib pen in England.
- John Heathcoat is granted his first patent for a bobbinet lace machine in England.

== Awards ==
- Copley Medal: William Henry
- Joseph-Louis Lagrange is appointed by Napoleon as a Grand Officer of the Legion of Honour and a Comte of the French Empire.

== Births ==
- February 29 – Hugh Falconer, Scottish-born geologist, botanist, paleontologist and paleoanthropologist (died 1865).
- April 13 – Antonio Meucci, Italian-born inventor (died 1899).
- May 9 – John Scott Russell, Scottish-born naval architect and shipbuilder (died 1882).
- July 8 – George Robert Gray, English zoologist (died 1872).
- July 25 – Johann Benedict Listing, German mathematician (died 1882).
- August 4 – Johann Ritter von Oppolzer, Austrian physician (died 1871).
- October 29 – Caterina Scarpellini, Italian astronomer (died 1873).
- November 6 – Friedrich Julius Richelot, German mathematician (died 1875).
- Anne Elizabeth Ball, Irish|Irish phycologist (died 1872).

== Deaths ==
- March 3 – Johan Christian Fabricius, Danish entomologist (born 1745).
- May 18 – Rev. Elijah Craig, American inventor of bourbon whiskey (birth date uncertain).
- October 8 – John Sheldon, English anatomist (born 1752).
- October 21 – Maria Christina Bruhn, Swedish inventor (born 1732).
- December 24 – Thomas Beddoes, reforming English physician (born 1760).
