= 1801 in science =

The year 1801 in science and technology involved some significant events, listed below.

== Anthropology ==
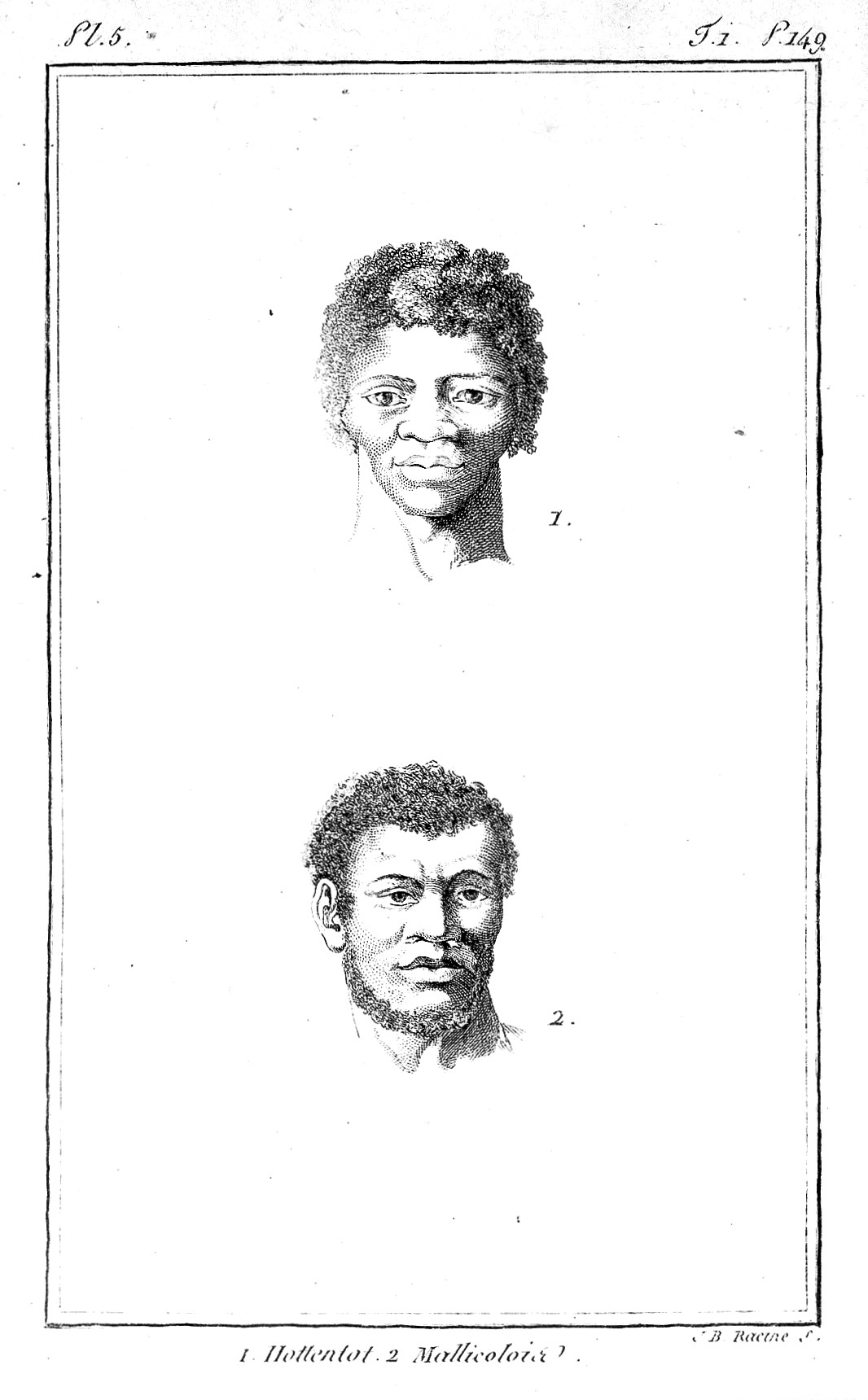
Plate from Virey's Histoire naturelle

- Julien-Joseph Virey publishes Histoire naturelle du genre humain, ou, recherches sur ses principaux fondements physiques et moraux, précédées d'un discours sur la nature des êtres organiques in Paris.

== Astronomy ==
- January 1 – Italian astronomer Giuseppe Piazzi makes the first discovery of an asteroid, Ceres, which is briefly considered to be the eighth planet.
- July 11 – French astronomer Jean-Louis Pons makes the first of his 37 comet discoveries.
- Jérôme Lalande and his staff at the Paris Observatory publish the astrometric star catalogue Histoire céleste française.

== Biology ==
- Jean-Baptiste Lamarck publishes Système des animaux sans vertèbres in Paris, a major work on the classification of the group of animals he is the first to describe as invertebrates. He is also first to separate the classes of arachnids and crustaceans from insects.
- André Michaux publishes Histoire des chênes de l'Amerique septentrionale ("History of the oaks of North America").

== Chemistry ==
- November 26 – Charles Hatchett announces to the Royal Society his discovery of the chemical element niobium, which he calls "columbium", in the ore columbite (it is renamed in 1950).
- Vanadium, a transition metal, is discovered by Andrés Manuel del Río in Mexico.
- René Just Haüy publishes his Traité de minéralogie.

== Mathematics ==
- Carl Friedrich Gauss's textbook on number theory, Disquisitiones Arithmeticae, is published in Leipzig.
- William Playfair produces the first pie chart and circle graph, to show part-whole relations.

== Medicine ==
- Xavier Bichat publishes his Anatomie générale.
- Philippe Pinel publishes Traité médico-philosophique sur l'aliénation mentale; ou la manie, presenting his enlightened humane psychological approach to the management of psychiatric hospitals. Translated into English by D. D. Davis as Treatise on Insanity in 1806, it is influential on both sides of the Atlantic during the 19th century.
- Antonio Scarpa publishes Saggio di osservazioni e d'esperienze sulle principali malattie degli occhi, earning him the title "father of Italian ophthalmology".
- Samuel Thomas von Sömmerring publishes Abbildungen des menschlichen Auges, including the first description of the macula in the retina of the human eye.

== Physics ==
- Dalton's law: John Dalton observes that the total pressure exerted by a gaseous mixture is equal to the sum of the partial pressures of each individual component in a gas mixture.
- Ultraviolet radiation is discovered by Johann Wilhelm Ritter.
- In optics, interference between light beams is discovered by Thomas Young, showing the wave nature of light.

== Technology ==
- July – Eli Whitney demonstrates before the United States Congress the advantages of the system of interchangeable parts in the manufacture of firearms.
- October 20 – First patent for the Fourdrinier continuous paper machine in England.
- December 24 – Cornish engineers Richard Trevithick and Andrew Vivian demonstrate "Puffing Devil", their steam-powered road locomotive, in Camborne, England.
- Joseph-Marie Jacquard develops the Jacquard Loom, in which holes strategically punched in a pasteboard card direct the movement of needles, thread, and fabric.
- The first iron (chain) suspension bridge is built by James Finley at Jacob's Creek in Westmoreland County, Pennsylvania.
- The xaenorphica, a bow-stringed instrument with a keyboard, is invented by C. L. Röllig of Vienna (the strings are set in vibration by violin bows).

== Awards ==
- Copley Medal: Astley Paston Cooper

== Births ==
- January 22 – Friedrich Gerke, German pioneer of telegraphy (died 1888)
- April 19 – Gustav Fechner, German psychologist (died 1887)
- May 17 – Lovisa Åhrberg, Swedish surgeon (died 1881)
- June 16 – Julius Plücker, German mathematician and physicist (died 1868)
- July 14 – Johannes Peter Müller, German physiologist (died 1858)
- July 31 – George Biddell Airy, English astronomer (died 1892)
- August 16 – Jacques Etienne Chevalley de Rivaz, Swiss-born physician (died 1863)
- September 21 – Moritz von Jacobi, German-born electrical engineer (died 1874)
- October 14 – Joseph Plateau, Belgian physicist (died 1883)

== Deaths ==
- May 17 – William Heberden, English physician (born 1710)
- Honoré Blanc, French gunsmith (born 1736)
