= 1802 in science =

The year 1802 in science and technology involved some significant events, listed below.

== Astronomy ==
- March 28 – H. W. Olbers discovers the asteroid Pallas, the second known.
- May 6 – William Herschel coins the term asteroid and on July 1 first uses the term binary star to refer to a star which revolves around another.

== Biology ==
- Pierre André Latreille begins publication of his Histoire naturelle générale et particulière des crustacés et insectes.
- George Montagu publishes his Ornithological Dictionary; or Alphabetical Synopsis of British Birds.
- In the history of evolutionary thought
  - Jean-Baptiste Lamarck publishes Recherches sur l'Organisation des Corps Vivants, proposing that all life is organized in a vertical chain of progressive complexity.
  - Gottfried Reinhold Treviranus begins publication of Biologie; oder die Philosophie der lebenden Natur, proposing a theory of the transmutation of species.

== Chemistry ==
- June – The first account of Thomas Wedgwood's experiments in photography using silver nitrate is published by Humphry Davy in the Journal of the Royal Institution in London. Since a fixative for the image has not yet been devised, the early photographs quickly fade.
- July – William Hyde Wollaston notes the discovery of the noble metal palladium.
- Charles's law (the "law of volumes"), describing how gases tend to expand when heated, is first published in France by Joseph Louis Gay-Lussac.

== Ecology ==
- Civil engineer and geographer François Antoine Rauch publishes Harmonie hydro-végétale et météorologique: ou recherches sur les moyens de recréer avec nos forêts la force des températures et la régularité des saisons par des plantations raisonnées in Paris, arguing against deforestation.

== Geology ==
- James Smithson proves that zinc carbonates are true carbonate minerals and not zinc oxides, as was previously thought.
- John Playfair publishes Illustrations of the Huttonian Theory of the Earth in Edinburgh, popularising James Hutton's theory of geology.
- James Sowerby begins to issue his British Mineralogy, or, coloured figures intended to elucidate the mineralogy of Great Britain in London, the first comprehensive illustrated reference work on the subject.

== Medicine ==
- June – The first pediatric hospital, the Hôpital des Enfants Malades, opens in Paris, on the site of a previous orphanage.
- London Fever Hospital founded.
- Charles Bell publishes The Anatomy of the Brain, Explained in a Series of Engravings.

== Meteorology ==
- December – Luke Howard presents the basis of the modern classification and nomenclature of clouds, at a lecture in London.

== Physics ==
- Johann Wilhelm Ritter builds the first electrochemical cell.

== Surveying ==
- April 10 – Great Trigonometric Survey of India begins with the measurement of a baseline near Madras.

== Technology ==
- November 5 – Marc Isambard Brunel begins installation of his blockmaking machinery at Portsmouth Block Mills in England.
- George Bodley of Exeter in England patents the first enclosed kitchen stove.

== Publications ==
- January 2 – Rev. Abraham Rees begins publication in London of The New Cyclopædia, or Universal Dictionary of Arts and Sciences.

== Awards ==
- Copley Medal: William Hyde Wollaston

== Births ==
- February 6 – Charles Wheatstone, English inventor (died 1875)
- April 4 – Dorothea Dix, American mental health reformer (died 1887)
- July 9 – Thomas Davenport, American inventor (died 1851)
- August 5 – Niels Henrik Abel, Norwegian mathematician (died 1829)
- October 10 – Hugh Miller, Scottish geologist (suicide 1856)
- December 15 – János Bolyai, Hungarian mathematician (died 1860)

== Deaths ==
- April 14 – John Mackay, Scottish botanist (born 1772)
- April 18 – Erasmus Darwin, English author of Zoonomia (born 1731)
- November 16 – André Michaux, French botanist (born 1746)
