= 1810 in science =

The year 1810 in science and technology included many events, some of which are listed here.

== Chemistry ==
- Chlorine is named by Humphry Davy.
- Cantharidin is isolated by Pierre Jean Robiquet from Lytta vesicatoria (Spanish fly) in Paris.

== Mathematics ==
- Charles Julien Brianchon proves Brianchon's theorem.

== Medicine ==
- John Haslam, resident apothecary at Bethlem Hospital in London, produces the book Illustrations of Madness: Exhibiting a Singular Case of Insanity, And a No Less Remarkable Difference in Medical Opinions: Developing the Nature of An Assailment, And the Manner of Working Events; with a Description of Tortures Experienced by Bomb-Bursting, Lobster-Cracking and Lengthening the Brain, the first full-length study of a single psychiatric patient (James Matthews) in medical history and the original description of the symptoms of paranoid schizophrenia.
- Franz Joseph Gall (with Johann Spurzheim) begins publishing Anatomie et physiologie du système nerveux en général et anatomie du cerveau en particulier, avec des observations sur la possibilité de reconnoître plusieurs dispositions intellectuelles et morales de l'homme et des animaux, par la configuration de leurs têtes in Paris, pioneering study of the localization of mental functions in the brain and popularising phrenology.
- Samuel Hahnemann publishes Organon der rationellen Heilkunde, the fundamental text for his theory of homeopathy.
- Karolinska Institute established in Stockholm (Sweden).

== Physics ==
- Johann Wolfgang von Goethe publishes his Theory of Colours.

== Technology ==
- June – Nicolas Appert publishes L'art de conserver pendant plusieurs années toutes les substances animales ou végétales, the first description of modern food preservation using airtight containers.

== Zoology ==
- Antoine Risso publishes Ichthyologie de Nice.

== Births ==
- January 12 – John Dillwyn Llewelyn (died 1882), Welsh botanist and photographer.
- April 6 – Philip Henry Gosse (died 1888), English science writer.
- May 31 – Filip Neriusz Walter (died 1847), Polish organic chemist.
- July 21 – Henri Victor Regnault (died 1878), French physical chemist.
- August 10 – Forbes Winslow (died 1874), English psychiatrist.
- September 24 – Caroline Rosenberg (died 1902), Danish botanist.
- October 12 – Alexander Bain (died 1877), Scottish inventor.
- November 11 – Orlando Whistlecraft (died 1893), English meteorologist.
- November 28 – William Froude (died 1879), English hydrodynamicist.
- December 7 – Theodor Schwann (died 1882), German physiologist.
- December 28 – John Thurnam (died 1873), English psychiatrist and ethnologist.

== Deaths ==
- February 24 – Henry Cavendish, English physicist and chemist (born 1731).
- May 2 – Jean-Louis Baudelocque, French obstetrician (born 1745)
- June 26 – Joseph Michel Montgolfier, French pioneer balloonist (born 1740).
