= 1811 in science =

The year 1811 in science and technology involved some significant events, listed below.

== Astronomy ==
- March 25 – Great Comet discovered by Honoré Flaugergues.

== Biology ==
- Johann Karl Wilhelm Illiger publishes Prodromus systematis mammalium et avium, an updating of Linnean taxonomy and a major influence on the concept of the 'Family' in biological taxonomy. He first defines the infraclass Marsupialia.
- Peter Simon Pallas begins publication of Zoographia rosso-Asiatica, sistens omnium animalium in extenso Imperio rossico, et adjacentibus maribus observatorum recensionem, domicilia, mores et descriptiones, anatomen atque icones plurimorum in Saint Petersburg.
- The original McIntosh red apple sapling is discovered on his Dundela farm in Upper Canada by John McIntosh (farmer).

== Chemistry ==
- Bernard Courtois discovers iodine.
- Joseph Louis Gay-Lussac and Louis Jacques Thénard publish Recherches Physico-Chimiques, faites sur la pile; sur la préparation chimique et les propriétés du potassium et du sodium; sur la décomposition de l'acide boracique; sur les acides fluorique, muriatique et muriatique oxigéné; sur l'action chimique de la lumière; sur l'analyse végétale et animale, etc. in Paris.
- Amedeo Avogadro proposes Avogadro's law, that equal volumes of gases under constant temperature and pressure contain equal number of molecules.

== Earth sciences ==
- June 10 – A volcanic eruption, observed from British sloop HMS Sabrina (1806), briefly creates Sabrina Island (Azores).

== Mathematics ==
- Carl Friedrich Gauss works with functions of complex number variables.
- S. D. Poisson publishes Traité de mécanique (vol. 1).

== Medicine ==
- Charles Bell publishes An Idea of a New Anatomy of the Brain, starting to distinguish between sensory and motor nerves.
- Abraham Colles publishes A Treatise on Surgical Anatomy in Dublin.
- Francis Place publishes Illustrations and Proofs of the Principles of Population, including an examination of the proposed remedies of Mr. Malthus, and a reply to the objections of Mr. Godwin and others in London, the first significant text in English to advocate contraception.

== Paleontology ==
- Mary Anning discovers the fossilised remains of an Ichthyosaur at Lyme Regis.

== Physics ==
- Amedeo Avogadro proposes his hypothesis relating volumes and numbers of molecules of gases.

== Technology ==
- Friedrich Koenig, with the assistance of Andreas Friedrich Bauer, produces the first steam rotary printing press, in London.

== Awards ==
- Copley Medal: Benjamin Brodie

== Births ==
- March 2 – Hugh Edwin Strickland, English geologist and ornithologist (died 1853)
- March 11
  - Lady Katherine Sophia Kane née Baily, Irish botanist (died 1886)
  - Urbain Le Verrier, French astronomer (died 1877)
- March 30 – Robert Bunsen, German chemist (died 1899)
- July 13 – James Young, Scottish chemist (died 1883)
- September 14 – William Budd, English physician and epidemiologist (died 1880)
- October 25 – Évariste Galois, French mathematician (died 1832)
- John Waterston, Scottish physicist and civil engineer (died 1883)

== Deaths ==
- February 9 – Nevil Maskelyne, English Astronomer Royal (born 1732)
- August 31 – Louis Antoine de Bougainville, French explorer (born 1729)
- September 8 – Peter Simon Pallas, German-born naturalist (born 1741)
