= 1806 in science =

The year 1806 in science and technology involved some significant events, listed below.

== Biology ==
- July 3 – Michael Keens of Isleworth, England, selects the Keens Imperial cultivar of strawberry from many hybrids, which becomes a popular commercial breed in this century.
- Publication begins in London of the Flora Graeca collected by John Sibthorp.
- Pierre André Latreille begins publication in France of Genera crustaceorum et insectorum, secundum ordinem naturalem ut familias disposita.

== Chemistry ==
- November 20 – Humphry Davy presents the results of his researches in the electrolysis of water to the Royal Society of London.
- Louis Nicolas Vauquelin and Pierre Jean Robiquet isolate asparagine in crystalline form from asparagus juice in France, the first amino acid identified.

== Exploration ==
- August – English seal hunter Abraham Bristow discovers the Auckland Islands.

== Mathematics ==
- Jean-Robert Argand introduces the Argand diagram.
- Adrien-Marie Legendre gives the first published application of the method of least squares, in a supplement to his Nouvelles méthodes pour la détermination des orbites des comètes.

== Medicine ==
- John Bell concludes publication of The Principles of Surgery in two volumes (1801–06). Its treatment of arterial surgery in particular ranks him as a founder of vascular surgery. His brother Charles Bell publishes Essays on The Anatomy of Expression in Painting.

== Technology ==
- October 7 – Carbon paper patented by Ralph Wedgwood in the United Kingdom.

== Awards ==
- Copley Medal: Thomas Andrew Knight

== Births ==
- January 14 – Matthew Fontaine Maury, American oceanographer (died 1873)
- February 14 – Joseph-François Malgaigne, French surgeon (died 1865)
- February 18 – Eduard Heis, German mathematician and astronomer (died 1877)
- April 9 – Isambard Kingdom Brunel, British civil engineer (died 1859)
- June 12 – John A. Roebling, German American bridge engineer (died 1869)
- June 27 – Augustus De Morgan, British logician (died 1871)
- November 21 – Alexander Henry Haliday, Irish entomologist (died 1870)
- December 11
  - Otto Wilhelm Hermann von Abich, German geologist (died 1886)
  - Alfred Swaine Taylor, English toxicologist, "father of British forensic medicine" (died 1880)
- Approximate date – Luther V. Bell, American psychiatric physician (died 1862)

== Deaths ==
- c. January?? – Mungo Park, Scottish explorer of West Africa (born 1771)
- April 5 – Benjamin Bell, Scottish surgeon (born 1749)
- June 23 – Mathurin Jacques Brisson, French zoologist (born 1723)
- August 3 – Michel Adanson, French botanist (born 1727)
- August 23 – Charles-Augustin de Coulomb, French physicist (born 1736)
- October 9 – Benjamin Banneker, African-American astronomer and surveyor (born 1731)
