= 1803 in science =

The year 1803 in science and technology involved some significant events.

== Astronomy ==
- April 26 – A meteorite shower falls on L'Aigle in Normandy; Jean Baptiste Biot demonstrates that it is of extraterrestrial origin.

== Botany ==
- Publication (posthumously) of André Michaux's Flora Boreali-Americana in Paris, the first flora of North America.
- Publication of Erik Acharius's work Methodus qua omnes detectos lichenes, a foundational taxonomic treatise on lichen classification
- University of Tartu Botanical Gardens established.

== Chemistry ==
- January 1 – William Henry's formulation of his law on the solubility of gases first published.
- September 3 – English scientist John Dalton starts using symbols to represent the atoms of different chemical elements.
- October 21 – John Dalton's atomic theory and list of molecular weights first made known, at a lecture in Manchester.
- William Hyde Wollaston discovers the chemical element rhodium.
- Smithson Tennant discovers the chemical elements iridium and osmium.
- Cerium is discovered in Bastnäs (Sweden) by Jöns Jakob Berzelius and Wilhelm Hisinger, and independently in Germany by Martin Heinrich Klaproth.
- Claude Louis Berthollet publishes Essai de statique chimique in Paris.

== Exploration ==
- June 9 – Matthew Flinders completes the first known circumnavigation of Australia.

== Mathematics ==
- Gian Francesco Malfatti presents his conjecture regarding Malfatti circles.

== Medicine ==
- Jean Marc Gaspard Itard first recognises pneumothorax.
- Dr Thomas Percival of Manchester publishes his Medical Ethics; or, a Code of Institutes and Precepts, Adapted to the Professional Conduct of Physicians and Surgeons, coining the expression medical ethics.

== Meteorology ==
- Luke Howard publishes the basis of the modern classification and nomenclature of clouds.

== Technology ==
- Robert Ransome invents the self-sharpening chilled cast-iron ploughshare in Ipswich, England.
- The first Fourdrinier continuous papermaking machine is installed in Hertfordshire, England.

== Transport ==
- January 4 – William Symington demonstrates his Charlotte Dundas, the "first practical steamboat", in Scotland.
- July 26 – The Surrey Iron Railway, a wagonway between Wandsworth and Croydon, is opened, being the first public railway line in England.
- Thomas Telford begins work on construction of the Caledonian Canal and improving roads in Scotland.

== Awards ==
- Copley Medal: Richard Chenevix

== Births ==
- February 26 – Arnold Adolph Berthold, German physiologist (died 1861)
- February 28 – Christian Heinrich von Nagel, German geometer (died 1882)
- April 1 – Miles Joseph Berkeley, English cryptogamist (died 1889)
- May 12 – Justus von Liebig, German chemist (died 1873)
- May 24 – Charles Lucien Bonaparte, French naturalist (died 1857)
- June 8 – Amalia Assur, Swedish dentist (died 1889)
- July 31 – John Ericsson, Swedish-born mechanical engineer and inventor (died 1889)
- October 3 – John Gorrie, American physician and inventor (died 1855)
- October 6 – Heinrich Wilhelm Dove, Prussian physicist and climatologist (died 1879)
- October 16 – Robert Stephenson, English railway engineer (died 1859)
- November 29 – Christian Doppler, Austrian mathematician and discoverer of the Doppler effect (died 1853)
- December 21 – Joseph Whitworth, English mechanical engineer (died 1887)
- Choe Han-gi, Korean philosopher of science (died 1877)

== Deaths ==
- May 8 – John Joseph Merlin, Liège-born English inventor (born 1735)
- October 14 – Ami Argand, Genevan physicist and chemist (born 1750)
