= Orlando (given name) =

Orlando is a masculine given name, originally an Italian form of the given name Roland.

== Notable people with the name include ==
=== A ===
- Orlando Ramón Agosti (1924–1997), Argentinian general
- Orlando Allen (1803–1874), American politician
- Orlando Álvarez (1952–2016), Puerto Rican baseball player
- Orlando Álvarez (lawyer) (1935–2013), Chilean lawyer
- Orlando Amêndola (1899–1974), Brazilian swimmer
- Orlando Anderson (1974–1998), American murder suspect
- Orlando Antigua (born 1973), American basketball coach
- Orlando Antonini (born 1944), Italian prelate
- Orlando Aravena (born 1942), Chilean footballer
- Orlando Arcia (born 1994), Venezuelan baseball player
- Orlando Aryee (born 1954), Ghanaian politician
- Orlando Azinhais (1933–2005), Portuguese fencer

=== B ===
- Orlando Baccino (born 1970), Argentinian judoka
- Orlando Bailey (born 2001), English rugby union footballer
- Orlando Baker (born 1979), Jamaican-American cricketer
- Orlando Harrison Baker (1830–1913), American professor
- Orlando Bareiro (born 1978), Paraguayan footballer
- Orlando M. Barnes (1824–1899), American politician
- Orlando Barone (born 1941), Argentinian journalist
- Orlando Bates (born 1950), Barbadian cyclist
- Orlando Aloysius Battista (1917–1995), Canadian-American chemist
- Orlando Bauzon (1944–2020), Filipino basketball player
- Orlando Echeverri Benedetti (born 1980), Colombian writer
- Orlando Benítez (born 1983), Colombian politician
- Orlando Bennett (born 1999), Jamaican hurdler
- Orlando Bianchini (born 1955), Italian hammer thrower
- Orlando Bloom (born 1977), British actor
- Orlando Bobo (1974–2007), American football player
- Orlando Bonsignori (??–1273), Italian banker
- Orlando Bordón (born 1986), Paraguayan footballer
- Orlando Borrego (1936–2021), Cuban economist
- Orlando Bosch (1926–2011), Cuban militant
- Orlando Boss (1844–1931), American army officer
- Orlando Charnock Bradley (1871–1937), British veterinarian
- Orlando Brandes (born 1946), Brazilian prelate
- Orlando Bravo (born 1970), Puerto Rican businessman
- Orlando Bridgeman (disambiguation), multiple people
- Orlando Brown (disambiguation), multiple people
- Orlando Bueso (born 1974), Honduran footballer
- Orlando Franklin Bump (1841–1884), American lawyer
- Orlando Burrell (1826–1921), American politician
- Orlando Bush (1849–1925), Canadian businessman
- Orlando Busino (1926–2022), American cartoonist

=== C ===
- Orlando Cabrera (born 1974), Colombian baseball player
- Orlando Cáceres (born 1961), Puerto Rican wrestler
- Orlando Calixte (born 1992), Dominican baseball player
- Orlando Campos (1925–1994), Indian bridge player
- Orlando Canizales (born 1965), American boxer
- Orlando Capellino (born 1958), Uruguayan football manager
- Orlando Carrió (1955–2002), Argentinian-Mexican actor
- Orlando "Boo" Carter (born 2005), American football player
- Orlando E. Caruana (1844–1917), Maltese-American soldier
- Orlando Casares, Argentinian football manager
- Orlando Castillo (born 1967), Colombian cyclist
- Orlando Catinchi (born 1957), Puerto Rican swimmer
- Orlando P. Carvalho, American business executive
- Orlando Cepeda (born 1937), Puerto Rican baseball player
- Orlando Chavarria (born 1971), Belizean cyclist
- Orlando Chaves (disambiguation), multiple people
- Orlando Coleman (born 1992), American basketball player
- Orlando Colmán (born 2002), Paraguayan footballer
- Orlando Conga, American singer
- Orlando Contreras (footballer) (born 1982), Peruvian footballer
- Orlando Cornejo (1929–2015), Chilean politician
- Orlando Corradi (1940–2018), Italian film director
- Orlando Cossani (1932–2004), Argentinian swimmer
- Orlando Costa (born 1977), Portuguese football manager
- Orlando Costas (1942–1987), Puerto Rican theologian
- Orlando Cowley (born 1953), Cuban water polo player
- Orlando Cruz (born 1981), Puerto Rican boxer

=== D ===
- Orlando da Costa (1929–2006), Portuguese writer
- Orlando da Costa (footballer) (born 1985), Brazilian footballer
- Orlando Daniels (1860–1927), Canadian politician
- Orlando d'Aragona (1296–1361), Italian noble
- Orlande de Lassus (1532–1594), Franco-Flemish composer
- Orlando de la Torre (1943–2022), Peruvian footballer
- Orlando Fortunato de Oliveira (born 1946), Angolan film director
- Orlando DiGirolamo (1924–1998), American musician
- Orlando Dollente (born 1964), Filipino boxer
- Orlando dos Santos Costa (born 1981), Brazilian footballer
- Orlando Drummond (1919–2021), Brazilian actor
- Orlando Duarte (1932–2020), Brazilian sports journalist
- Orlando Duque (born 1974), Colombian diver
- Orlando Dutton (1894–1962), English-Australian sculptor

=== E ===
- Orlando Early (born 1967), American basketball coach
- Orlando Egüez (1974–2019), Bolivian lawyer
- Orlando Javier Elizeche (born 1987), Paraguayan runner
- Orlando Ellsworth (1813–1872), American politician
- Orlando Engelaar (born 1979), Dutch footballer
- Orlando Etcheberrigaray (1933–2017), Chilean basketball player

=== F ===
- Orlando Fanasca (born 1983), Italian footballer
- Orlando Fedeli (1933–2010), Brazilian historian
- Orlando Fenwick (1822–1897), Australian politician
- Orlando Ferguson (1846–1911), American cartographer
- Orlando Fernández (born 1971), Puerto Rican swimmer
- Orlando Fernandez (boxer) (born 1963), Puerto Rican boxer
- Orlando Ferrante (born 1932), American football player
- Orlando Ferreira (born 1953), Portuguese judoka
- Orlando B. Ficklin (1808–1886), American politician
- Orlando Figes (born 1959), British historian
- Orlando Figuera (1996–2017), Venezuelan activist
- Orlando Figueroa (born 1955), Puerto Rican engineer
- Orlando Flacco, Italian artist
- Orlando García Flores (born 1965), Mexican politician
- Orlando Franklin (born 1987), Jamaican American football player
- Orlando Fuentes (born 1974), American judoka

=== G ===
- Orlando Galo (born 2000), Costa Rican footballer
- Orlando Garner (born 1963), Honduras Minister of National Defense
- Orlando Gando (born 1992), São Toméan footballer
- Orlando Gaona (born 1990), Paraguayan footballer
- Orlando Garcia (disambiguation), multiple people
- Orlando Garrido (disambiguation), multiple people
- Orlando Gee (1619–1705), English politician
- Orlando Gibbons (1583–1625), English composer
- Orlando Gill (born 2000), Paraguayan footballer
- Orlando Gómez (born 1946), Puerto Rican baseball coach
- Orlando Gonçalves (born 1938), Portuguese wrestler
- Orlando González (born 1951), Cuban baseball player
- Orlando Gough (born 1953), British composer
- Orlando Graham (born 1965), American basketball player
- Orlando Grootfaam (1974–2019), Surinamese footballer
- Orlando Requeijo Gual, Cuban diplomat
- Orlando Gutiérrez (disambiguation), multiple people
- Orlando Gutiérrez-Boronat (born 1965), Cuban author

=== H ===
- Orlando J. Heinitz (1921–2007), American businessman and politician
- Orlando Hernández (born 1965), Cuban-American baseball player
- Juan Orlando Hernández (born 1968), President of Honduras from 2014 to 2022
- Orlando Sierra Hernández (1959–2002), Colombian columnist
- Orlando Martínez Howley (1944–1975), Dominican journalist
- Orlando Huacón (born 1989), Ecuadorian wrestler
- Orlando Hubbs (1840–1930), American politician
- Orlando Hudson (born 1977), American baseball player
- Orlando Huff (born 1978), American football player

=== I ===
- Orlando Irizarry (born 1985), Puerto Rican volleyball player
- Orlando Isales (born 1959), Puerto Rican baseball player

=== J ===
- Orlando Jewitt (1799–1869), British wood engraver
- Orlando Johnson (born 1989), American basketball player
- Orlando Jones (born 1968), American comedian and actor
- Orlando Jordan (born 1980), American professional wrestler
- Orlando Jorge (disambiguation), multiple people
- Orlando Julius (1943–2022), Nigerian musician

=== K ===
- Orlando Kellogg (1809–1865), American politician

=== L ===
- Orlando Lagos (1913–2007), Chilean photographer
- Orlando Lampa (1944–2020), Filipino runner
- Orlando Lansdorf (1965–2021), Surinamese drag queen
- Orlando Lanza (1932–1999), Cuban rower
- Orlando Paredes Lara (born 1940), Mexican politician
- Orlando Lattmann (born 1989), Swiss footballer
- Orlando Lavalle (born 1969), Peruvian football manager
- Orlando Luis Pardo Lazo (born 1971), Cuban writer
- Orlando le Fleming (born 1976), English cricketer and musician
- Orlando Lelé (1949–1999), Brazilian footballer
- Orlando Leopardi (1902–1972), Italian boxer
- Orlando Letelier (1932–1976), Chilean economist
- Orlando Lightfoot (born 1974), American basketball player
- Orlando Castro Llanes (1925–2014), Venezuelan businessman
- Orlando Llenza (1930–2021), Puerto Rican general
- Orlando Lorenzini (1890–1941), Italian general
- Orlando Lourenco (born 1964), Zimbabwean tennis player
- Orlando Lowry (born 1961), American football player
- Orlando Lübbert (born 1945), Chilean screenwriter
- Orlando Luz (born 1998), Brazilian tennis player

=== M ===
- Orlando Madrigal (1921–1991), Costa Rican judoka
- Orlando Maldonado (born 1959), Puerto Rican boxer
- Orlando Malone (born 1963), American boxer
- Orlando H. Manning (1847–1909), American politician
- Orlando Marin (born 1935), American musician
- Orlando Marín (1942–2014), Colombian footballer
- Orlando R. Marsh (1881–1938), American electrical engineer
- Orlando L. Martin (1872–1951), American politician
- Orlando Martínez (1944–2021), Cuban boxer
- Orlando Martins (1899–1985), Nigerian actor
- Orlando Maturana (born 1965), Colombian footballer
- Orlando McDaniel (1960–2020), American football player
- Orlando McFarlane (1938–2007), Cuban baseball player
- Orlando McKay (born 1969), American football player
- Orlando Meléndez (born 1979), Puerto Rican basketball player
- Orlando Mendes (1916–1990), Mozambican biologist
- Orlando Méndez-Valdez (born 1986), Mexican-American basketball player
- Orlando Ricardo Menes (born 1958), Cuban-American poet
- Orlando Jorge Mera (1966–2022), Dominican politician
- Orlando Mercado (born 1961), Puerto Rican baseball player
- Orlando S. Mercado (born 1946), Filipino politician
- Orlando Merced (born 1966), Puerto Rican baseball player
- Orlando Merlini (??–1510), Italian painter
- Orlando C. Merriman (1827–1906), American politician
- Orlando Miguel (born 1969), Cuban-Mexican actor
- Orlando Miller (born 1969), American baseball player
- Orlando Pérez Moguel (born 1965), Mexican politician
- Orlando Mohorović (1950–2018), Croatian artist
- Orlando Monteiro (born 1972), Cape Verdean footballer
- Orlando Mora (born 1960), Costa Rican runner
- Orlando Morgan (1865–1956), English composer

=== N ===
- Orlando Nadres (1938–1991), Filipino actor
- Orlando Nappe (1931–2007), Argentinian footballer
- Orlando Narváez (born 1958), Ecuadorian footballer
- Orlando Neto (born 1979), Portuguese footballer
- Orlando Niebles (born 1985), Colombian footballer
- Orlando Norie (1832–1901), British artist

=== O ===
- Orlando Oberto (born 1980), Italian baseball player
- Orlando Olcese, Peruvian academic administrator
- Orlando Paladino Orlandini (1905–1986), Italian sculptor
- Orlando Ortiz Chevres (born 1978), Puerto Rican politician
- Orlando Otey (1925–2011), Mexican pianist
- Orlando Owoh (1932-2008), Nigerian musician

=== P ===
- Orlando Pace (born 1975), American football player
- Orlando Paden (born 1984), American politician
- Orlando Palacios (born 1954), Cuban boxer
- Orlando Palmeiro (born 1969), American baseball player
- Orlando Pantera (1967–2001), Cape Verdean singer
- Orlando Parga (born 1939), Puerto Rican politician
- Orlando Parker (born 1972), American football player
- Orlando Patterson (born 1940), Jamaican sociologist
- Orlando Peçanha (1935–2010), Brazilian footballer
- Orlando Peña (born 1933), Cuban baseball player
- Orlando Peña (musician) (1928–1994), Cuban bassist
- Orlando Peralta (1930–2010), Argentinian basketball player
- Orlando Perez (born 1977), American soccer player
- Orlando Peters (born 1988), Antiguan cricketer
- Orlando Petinatti (born 1968), Uruguayan radio personality
- Orlando Henderson Petty (1874–1932), American politician
- Orlando Phillips (born 1960), American basketball player
- Orlando Pingo de Ouro (1923–2004), Brazilian footballer
- Orlando Metcalfe Poe (1832–1895), American general
- Orlando Pineda (born 1986), Mexican footballer
- Orlando Pizzolato (born 1958), Italian runner
- Orlando Plagata (1933/1934–2005), Filipino football manager
- Orlando Plummer (1836–1913), American politician
- Orlando Polanco (born 1999), Cuban judoka
- Orlando Polmonari (1924–2014), Italian gymnast
- Orlando B. Potter (1823–1894), American businessman and politician
- Orlando Prado (born 1972), Peruvian footballer

=== Q ===
- Orlando Quintana (born 1978), Spanish footballer

=== R ===
- Orlando Ramírez (born 1951), Colombian baseball player
- Orlando Ramos, American politician
- Orlando Ribalta (born 1998), Cuban baseball player
- Orlando Ribeiro (disambiguation), multiple people
- Orlando Rincón (born 1985), Mexican footballer
- Orlando Ríos (1947–2008), Cuban percussionist
- Orlando Rivas (born 1950), Colombian footballer
- Orlando Mejía Rivera (born 1961), Colombian writer
- Orlando Robinson (born 2000), American basketball player
- Orlando Rodrigues (born 1969), Portuguese cyclist
- Orlando Rodrigues (sailor) (1932–2000), Portuguese sailor
- Orlando Rodríguez (disambiguation), multiple people
- Orlando Román (born 1978), Puerto Rican baseball player
- Orlando Romero (born 1960), Peruvian boxer
- Orlando Rosa (born 1977), Puerto Rican wrestler
- Orlando Aponte Rosario (born 1984), Puerto Rican politician
- Orlando Rossardi (1938–2024), Cuban poet, playwright, and researcher
- Orlando Ruff (born 1976), American football player
- Orlando Ruíz (1935–2017), Cuban fencer

=== S ===
- Orlando Sá (born 1988), Portuguese footballer
- Orlando Sabino (1946–2013), Brazilian serial killer
- Orlando Sain (1912–??), Italian footballer
- Orlando Salido (born 1980), Mexican boxer
- Orlando Samuell (born 1946), Cuban volleyball player
- Orlando Sánchez (disambiguation), multiple people
- Orlando Santamaría (1920–1992), Cuban sports shooter
- Orlando Savarin (born 1938), Italian rower
- Orlando Scandrick (born 1987), American football player
- Orlando D. Schärer, Swiss biologist
- Orlando Sconza (born 1960), Argentinian professor
- Orlando Segatore (1923–2016), Canadian football player
- Orlando Sérgio (born 1960), Angolan actor
- Orlando Serrell (born 1968), American savant
- Orlando Silva (basketball) (born 1929), Chilean basketball player
- Orlando Silvestri (born 1972), French footballer
- Orlando Sinclair (born 1998), Costa Rican footballer
- Orlando Sirola (1928–1995), Italian tennis player
- Orlando Smart (born 1971), American basketball player
- Orlando Smeekes (born 1981), Curaçaoan footballer
- Orlando Smith (born 1944), British Virgin Islands politician
- Orlando J. Smith (1842–1908), American philosopher
- Orlando Stevens (1797–1879), American politician
- Orlando Strange (1826–1906), Canadian politician
- Orlando Suárez (born 1972), Spanish footballer

=== T ===
- Orlando Teani (1910–1972), Italian cyclist
- Orlando Terranova (born 1979), Argentinian racing driver
- Orlando Thomas (1972–2014), American football player
- Orlando Torres (born 1946), Venezuelan footballer
- Orlando Guerrero Torres, Venezuelan bishop
- Orlando Trustfull (born 1970), Dutch football manager

=== U ===
- Orlando Urbano (born 1984), Italian footballer
- Orlando Urdaneta (born 1950), Venezuelan actor

=== V ===
- Orlando Varona (1925–1977), Cuban baseball player
- Orlando Vásquez (disambiguation), multiple people
- Orlando P. Vaughan (1848–1925), American politician
- Orlando Vega (born 1968), Puerto Rican basketball player
- Orlando Vela (born 1994), Mexican footballer
- Orlando Ventura (born 1948), Mexican field hockey player
- Orlando Jorge Villegas (born 1991), Dominican politician
- Orlando von Einsiedel (born 1980), British film director
- Orlando Voorn (born 1968), Dutch disc jockey

=== W ===
- Orlando F. Wallihan (1833–1912), American politician
- Orlando Ward (1891–1972), American army officer
- Orlando Watters (born 1971), American football player
- Orlando Weld-Forester (1813–1894), British politician
- Orlando Wellington, Ghanaian football manager
- Orlando Wells (born 1973), English actor
- Orlando Whistlecraft (1810–1893), English meteorologist
- Orlando Wiet (1965–2026), Surinamese-Dutch kickboxer, boxer, and mixed martial artist
- Orlando B. Wilcox (1823–1907), American soldier
- Orlando Wilson (television presenter) (born 1947), American television personality
- Orlando Wirht (born 1981), Dutch footballer
- Orlando Woolridge (1959–2012), American basketball player

=== Y ===
- Orlando Yntema (born 1986), Dutch baseball player

=== Z ===
- Orlando Zapata (1967–2010), Cuban human rights activist

== See also ==
- Orlando (surname), a page for people surnamed "Orlando"
- Orlando (disambiguation)
