= Orlando =

Orlando commonly refers to:

- Orlando, Florida, a city in the United States
- Orlando: A Biography, a novel by Virginia Woolf

Orlando may also refer to:

== People ==
- Orlando (given name), a masculine name, includes a list of people with the name
- Orlando (surname), includes a list of people with the name
- Orlando (Frankish warrior) (died 778), the military leader best known as Roland who inspired the Italian medieval icon "Orlando"

== Arts and entertainment ==
=== Film and television ===
- Orlando (film), a 1992 film based on the novel
- Orlando, My Political Biography, a 2023 French documentary film
- Orlando (TV series), an early 1960s British thriller series

=== Fictional characters ===
- Orlando (character), the central character in a sequence of Italian verse romances from Dante, Ariosto and others
- Orlando (As You Like It), in William Shakespeare's As You Like It
- Orlando, the title character of Orlando: A Biography, a novel by Virginia Woolf, and its film and stage adaptations
- Orlando (fictional cat), central figure in Katherine Hale's The Marmalade Cat 1938–1972 series of children's books
- Orlando, from the comic book The Invisibles
- Orlando, from the comic book series The League of Extraordinary Gentlemen

=== Literature ===
- Orlando: A Biography, a novel by Virginia Woolf

=== Music ===
- Orlando (band), an English 1990s band, part of the Romo movement
- Orlando (opera), an opera by Handel
- Orlando, an opera by Nicola Porpora
- Orlando Festival, the oldest chamber music festival in the Netherlands
- "Orlando", a musical number from the musical The Book of Mormon
- "Orlando", a song by the American rapper XXXTentacion from his album 17
- Orlando Consort, a British vocal consort
- Orlando Productions, a French record label

== Places ==
=== South Africa ===
- Orlando, Soweto, a subdivision of Johannesburg

=== United States ===
- Orlando, Florida, a city
- Orlando Township, Cheyenne County, Kansas, a former settlement
- Orlando, Kentucky, an unincorporated community
- Orlando, Oklahoma, a town
- Orlando, West Virginia, an unincorporated community

=== Italy ===
- Monte Orlando, a wildlife park in Gaeta

== Military ==
- HMS Orlando, four Royal Navy ships
- USS Orlando, a United States Navy frigate
- Cantiere navale fratelli Orlando, Italian shipyard founded by Orlando brothers
- Orlando Army Air Base and Orlando Air Force Base, former air bases near Orlando, Florida

== Sports ==
=== Teams based in Orlando, Florida ===
==== Basketball ====
- Orlando Magic, a National Basketball Association team
- Orlando Miracle, a former Women's National Basketball Association team
- Orlando Waves, a former American Basketball Association team

==== Gridiron football ====
- Orlando Apollos, a former professional football team
- Orlando Guardians, a former professional football team
- Orlando Panthers, a former professional football team
- Orlando Predators, a former Arena Football League team
- Orlando Predators (2019), a professional indoor football team
- Orlando Rage, a former XFL football team
- Orlando Renegades, a former United States Football League team
- Orlando Anarchy, a women's football team

==== Soccer ====
- Orlando Pride, a professional soccer team
- Orlando Lions, a former soccer team
- Orlando City SC, a professional soccer club

==== Ice hockey ====
- Orlando Seals, a former minor league ice hockey team
- Orlando Solar Bears, a professional ice hockey team
- Orlando Solar Bears (IHL), a former professional minor league ice hockey team

==== Other sports ====
- Orlando Jackals, a former professional roller hockey team
- Orlando Storm (tennis), a former World TeamTennis team

=== Other sports ===
- Orlando Pirates F.C., a South African football club
- Orlando (horse), a British Thoroughbred racehorse

== Other uses ==
- Chevrolet Orlando, a make of car
- Orlando Airport (disambiguation)
- Orlando College of Osteopathic Medicine, Winter Garden, Florida
- Orlando High School, Orlando, Florida
- Orlando tangelo, a variety of citrus fruit
- Orlando Wines, an Australian winery
- Orlando (cat), the winner of a 2012 stock picking contest
- Orlando shooting of 2016, more commonly referred to as the Pulse nightclub shooting, a mass shooting in Orlando, Florida

== See also ==
- Orlanda (disambiguation)
- Olando, a Kenyan surname
- Orando, a fictional planet in the DC Comics universe
- Owando, a town in Congo
- Roland (disambiguation)
