= Barry Rogers =

American jazz and salsa trombonist (1935–1991)

Background information
- Born: Barron W. Rogers; May 22, 1935; New York City, US
- Died: April 18, 1991 (aged 55) New York City, US
- Genres: Jazz, pop, salsa
- Occupation: Musician
- Instrument: Trombone

Barron W. "Barry" Rogers (May 22, 1935 – April 18, 1991) was an American jazz and salsa trombonist.

== Career ==
Born in The Bronx, he descended from Polish Jews and was raised in Spanish Harlem. His family (original name: Rogenstein) possessed a strong musicality. His father and several of his uncles sang in the choir of Joseph Rosenblatt, and his mother taught in Africa and Mexico, inspiring an interest in music from other nations. Rogers attended Bronx Vocational High School, and during this time he began playing in small Latin bands. Shortly thereafter, he started playing with saxophonist Hugo Dickens, who introduced him to a number of influential musicians including Pete La Roca, Larry Harlow (musician), Hubert Laws, and many others.

As a student of the playing of jazz trombonists Jack Teagarden, Lawrence Brown, and J. C. Higginbotham, Rogers began to play Latin music in the mid-1950s and would be most associated with it from then on. He developed his style while working with Puerto Rican bandleader Eddie Palmieri. The two performed in the style of the Cuban conjunto, or small ensembles generally consisting of bass, rhythm, a singer and trumpet, but with emphasis on two trombones rather than trumpet.

Willie Colón regarded Rogers as his strongest musical influence and would feature him in many of his productions. Bobby Valentín would feature Rogers in his song "El Jíbaro y la Naturaleza", which led Marvin Santiago to nickname him "El Terror de los Trombones" for the record.

Rogers worked with Israel "Cachao" López, Machito, Manny Oquendo, Celia Cruz, Tito Puente, Cheo Feliciano, Johnny Pacheco, Chino Rodríguez, and the Fania All-Stars. Although known as a salsa trombonist and studio musician, he worked with jazz, soul, and pop musicians. He was a founding member of the band Dreams with Michael Brecker, Randy Brecker, and Billy Cobham. He also worked with George Benson, David Byrne, Ron Carter, Aretha Franklin, Don Grolnick, Bob James, Elton John, Chaka Khan, Bob Moses, Todd Rundgren, Carly Simon, Spyro Gyra, James Taylor, and Grover Washington Jr. The father of trumpeter Chris Rogers, Barry Rogers died suddenly, of unknown causes, in Washington Heights, Manhattan at the age of 55.

The opening song from 1992's Return of the Brecker Brothers, "Song for Barry", was written as a tribute by his former band member and friend Michael Brecker after his passing.

== Discography ==
Note: he is credited as "Barry Rodgers" on several records.

With Average White Band

- Soul Searching (Atlantic, 1976)
- Benny and Us (Atlantic, 1977)
- Warmer Communications (Atlantic, 1978)

With Fania All-Stars

- Live at the Red Garter Vol. 1 (Fania, 1968)
- Live at the Cheetah Vol. 2 (Fania, 1972)
- Latin-Soul-Rock (Fania, 1974)
- Live at Yankee Stadium Vol. 1 (Fania, 1975)
- Live at Yankee Stadium Vol. 2 (Fania, 1975)
- Tribute to Tito Rodriguez (Fania, 1976)
- Rhythm Machine (Columbia, 1977)
- Live (Fania, 1978)

With Jun Fukamachi

- Spiral Steps (Kitty, 1976)
- Triangle Session (Kitty, 1977)
- Evening Star (Kitty, 1978)
- On the Move (Alfa, 1978)

With Chaka Khan

- Chaka (Warner Bros., 1978)
- Naughty (Warner Bros., 1980)
- What Cha' Gonna Do for Me (Warner Bros., 1981) as Rodgers
- Chaka Khan (Warner Bros., 1982)

With Herbie Mann

- Discotheque (Atlantic, 1975)
- Sunbelt (Atlantic, 1978)
- Brazil Once Again (Atlantic, 1978)

With Eddie Palmieri

- Eddie Palmieri and His Conjunto La Perfecta (Alegre, 1962)
- Echando Pa'lante (Tico, 1964)
- Lo Que Traigo Es Sabroso (Alegre, 1964)
- Mambo Con Conga Is Mozambique (Tico, 1966)
- Molasses (Tico, 1967)
- Champagne (Tico, 1968)
- Salsa-Jazz-Descarga (Coco, 1978)
- Sentido (Mango 1973)
- The Sun of Latin Music (Coco, 1974)
- Unfinished Masterpiece (Coco, 1975)

With Esther Phillips

- What a Diff'rence a Day Makes (Kudu, 1975)
- For All We Know (Kudu, 1976)
- Capricorn Princess (Kudu, 1976)

With Ismael Quintana

- Ismael Quintana (Vaya, 1974)
- Lo Que Estoy Viviendo (Vaya, 1976)
- Amor Vida y Sentimiento (Vaya, 1977)

With Todd Rundgren

- Something/Anything? (Bearsville, 1972)
- A Wizard, A True Star (Bearsville, 1973)
- Todd (Bearsville, 1974)

With Dr. Lonnie Smith

- Afrodesia (Groove Merchant, 1975)
- Keep On Lovin (Groove Merchant, 1976)
- Funk Reaction (LRC, 1977)

With James Taylor

- One Man Dog (Warner Bros., 1972)
- Walking Man (Warner Bros., 1974)
- That's Why I'm Here (Columbia, 1985)

With Bobby Valentin

- Va a La Carcel Vol. 1 (Bronco, 1975)
- Va a La Carcel Vol. 2 (Bronco, 1975)
- Afuera (Bronco, 1976)

With others

- Aerosmith, Night in the Ruts (Columbia, 1979)
- Air, Air (Embryo, 1971)
- Joe Bataan, Afrofilipino (Salsoul, 1975)
- Celi Bee, Alternating Currents (APA 1978)
- Manu Dibango, Gone Clear (CRC, 1980)
- Manu Dibango, Ambassador (CRC, 1981)
- Andrea Brachfeld, Andrea (Latina 1978)
- Randall Bramblett, That Other Mile (Polydor, 1975)
- Brecker Brothers, Don't Stop the Music (Arista, 1977)
- Elkie Brooks, Two Days Away (A&M, 1977)
- Roy Buchanan, A Street Called Straight (Atlantic, 1976)
- David Byrne, Rei Momo (Luaka Bop, Sire, Warner Bros., 1989)
- Cachao, Dos (Salsoul, 1977)
- Tony Camillo, Bazuka (A&M, 1975)
- Ron Carter, Anything Goes (Kudu, 1975)
- Felix Cavaliere, Felix Cavaliere (Bearsville, 1974)
- Felix Cavaliere, Castles in the Air (Epic, 1979)
- Chic, Chic (Atlantic, 1977) as Rodgers
- Chic, C'est Chic (Atlantic, 1978)
- Bill Chinnock, Badlands (North Country, 1977)
- Bill Chinnock, Dime Store Heroes (North Country, 1980)
- Willie Colón, The Player (Fania, 2007)
- Hank Crawford, I Hear a Symphony (Kudu, 1975)
- Gregg Diamond, Gregg Diamond's Star Cruiser (Marlin, 1978)
- Gregg Diamond, Hardware (Mercury, 1979)
- Dr. John, City Lights (Horizon 1978)
- William Eaton, Struggle Buggy (Marlin, 1977)
- Pee Wee Ellis, Home in the Country (Savoy, 1977)
- Jon Faddis, Good and Plenty (Buddah, 1979)
- Joe Farrell, La Catedral y El Toro (Warner Bros., 1977)
- Cheo Feliciano, Felicidades (Vaya, 1973)
- Cheo Feliciano, The Singer (Vaya, 1976)
- Barry Finnerty, New York City (Victor, 1982)
- Aretha Franklin, Aretha (Arista, 1980)
- Steve Gadd, The Gadd Gang (Columbia, 1986)
- Mac Gollehon, La Fama (American Showplace, 2012)
- Gloria Gaynor, I've Got You (Polydor, 1976)
- Gloria Gaynor, Glorious (Polydor, 1977)
- Don Grolnick, Weaver of Dreams (Blue Note, 1990)
- Henri Guedon, Olympia 80 (Blue Silver 1980)
- Larry Harlow, Our Latin Feeling (Nuestro Sentimiento Latino) (Fania, 1980)
- Larry Harlow, Yo Soy Latino (Fania, 1982)
- Nona Hendryx, Nona Hendryx (Epic, 1977)
- Bob James, H (Tappan Zee, 1980)
- The Jammers, The Jammers (Salsoul, 1982)
- Elton John, Blue Moves (Rocket, 1976)
- Luther Kent, World Class (RCS, 1978)
- Ryo Kawasaki, Mirror of My Mind (Satellites, 1997)
- Ijahman Levi, Tell It to the Children (Tree Roots 1982)
- O'Donel Levy, Windows (Groove Merchant, 1976)
- Ralph MacDonald, The Path (Marlin, 1978)
- Ralph MacDonald, Counterpoint (Marlin, 1979)
- Machito, Fireworks (Coco, 1977)
- Jimmy Maelen, Beats Workin (Pavillion, 1980)
- Van McCoy, Lonely Dancer (MCA, 1979)
- Jimmy McGriff, Red Beans (Groove Merchant, 1976)
- Jimmy McGriff, Tailgunner (LRC, 1977)
- Meco, Moondancer (Casablanca, 1979)
- Bette Midler, Songs for the New Depression (Atlantic, 1976)
- Bob Mintzer, Horn Man (Agharta, 1982)
- Ismael Miranda, No Voy Al Festival (Fania, 1977)
- Bob Moses, When Elephants Dream of Music (Gramavision, 1983)
- Alphonse Mouzon, Funky Snakefoot (Blue Note, 1974)
- Idris Muhammad, House of the Rising Sun (Kudu, 1976)
- Chico O'Farrill, Latin Roots (Philips, 1976)
- Orquesta Broadway, Pasaporte (Coco, 1976)
- Johnny Pacheco, His Flute and Latin Jam (Fania, 1965)
- Parliament, Trombipulation (Casablanca, 1980)
- Jimmy Ponder, All Things Beautiful (LRC, 1978)
- Pucho & His Latin Soul Brothers, Dateline (Prestige, 1969)
- Frank Quintero, Hechizo (CBS, 1978)
- Ismael Rivera, Feliz Navidad (Fania, 2006)
- Max Romeo, Holding Out My Love to You (Shanachie, 1981)
- Jimmy Sabater, Solo (Tico, 1969)
- Mongo Santamaria & Justo Betancourt, Ubane (Vaya, 1976)
- Masahiko Satoh, All-in All-Out (Openskye, 1979)
- Don Sebesky, The Rape of El Morro (CTI, 1975)
- Carly Simon, Hotcakes (Elektra, 1974)
- Carly Simon, Boys in the Trees (Elektra, 1978)
- Sister Sledge, We Are Family (Cotillion, 1979)
- Phoebe Snow, Never Letting Go (Columbia, 2011)
- David Spinozza, Spinozza (A&M, 1978)
- Spyro Gyra, Catching the Sun (MCA, 1980)
- Candi Staton, Chance (Warner Bros., 1979)
- Sweet Sensation, Love Child (ATCO, 1990)
- Richard Tee, Strokin (Tappan Zee, 1979)
- Richard Tee, Natural Ingredients (Tappan Zee, 1980)
- Joe Thomas, Feelin's from Within (Groove Merchant, 1976)
- Joe Thomas, Here I Come (LRC, 1977)
- Cal Tjader & Eddie Palmieri, El Sonido Nuevo (Verve, 1966)
- Roberto Torres, El Castigador (Mericana, 1973)
- Roberto Torres, Roberto Torres de Nuevo (Salsoul, 1976)
- Peter Tosh, Mystic Man (Columbia, 1979)
- Peter Tosh, Wanted Dread & Alive (EMI, 1981)
- John Tropea, To Touch You Again (Marlin, 1979)
- Tina Turner, Love Explosion (United Artists, 1979)
- Stanley Turrentine, The Man with the Sad Face (Fantasy, 1976)
- Thijs van Leer, Nice to Have Met You (CBS, 1978)
- Grover Washington Jr., Feels So Good (Kudu, 1975)
- Tony Williams, The Joy of Flying (Columbia, 1979)
- Norma Jean Wright, Norma Jean (Bearsville, 1978) as Rodgers
- Pete Yellin, It's the Right Thing (Mainstream, 1973)
- Zulema, Z-licious (London, 1978)
