= Harvard Educational Review =

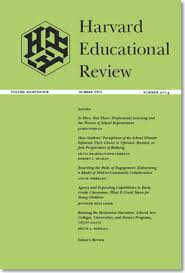
- Discipline: Education
- Language: English

Publication details
- History: 1930–present
- Publisher: Harvard Education Publishing Group (United States)
- Frequency: Quarterly

Standard abbreviations
- ISO 4: Harv. Educ. Rev.

Indexing
- ISSN: 0017-8055 (print); 1943-5045 (web)
- LCCN: 34007870
- OCLC no.: 1587741

Links
- Journal homepage

The Harvard Educational Review is an academic journal of opinion and research dealing with education, associated with the Harvard Graduate School of Education, and published by the Harvard Education Publishing Group. The journal was established in 1930.

Since 1945, editorial decisions have been carried out by an autonomous graduate student editorial board. This student board works together to bring to publication manuscripts on a wide range of topics and from a number of disciplines.

In June 2025, the publisher abruptly cancelled an entire special issue of the journal on "education and Palestine" shortly before publication, without involving the editorial board. Over 115 education scholars condemned the cancellation in an open letter.

== Alumni ==
Notable alumni of the Harvard Educational Review include:

- Lisa Delpit, educationalist and MacArthur Fellow
- Eve L. Ewing, sociologist, author, poet, and visual artist
- Sara Lawrence-Lightfoot, educational sociologist and MacArthur Fellow
- Orval Hobart Mowrer, psychologist and former president of the American Psychological Association
- Lauren Resnick, educational psychologist
- Theodore Sizer, educationalist and founder of the Coalition of Essential Schools
- Julian Stanley, psychologist and founder of the Center for Talented Youth
