= Orlanda =

Orlanda may refer to:

== People ==
- Orlanda Amarílis (1924–2014), Cape Verdean author
- Orlanda Maria Duarte Santos Ferreira, Cape Verdean politician
- Orlanda Velez Isidro (born 1973), Portuguese soprano

== Ships ==
- SS Orlanda, a German cargo ship in service 1920–45

== Books ==
- Orlanda, a 1996 novel by Jacqueline Harpman

== See also ==
- Orlando (given name)
- Orlando (disambiguation)
