= Orlando Rodríguez =

Orlando Rodríguez may refer to:

- Orlando Rodríguez (footballer) (born 1984), Panamanian footballer
- Orlando "Q" Rodriguez (born 1947), American percussionist

== See also ==
- Orlando Rodrigues (born 1969), Portuguese cyclist
- Orlando Rodrigues (sailor) (1932–2000), Portuguese sailor
