= Orlando (surname) =

Orlando is a Southern Italian-origin surname, a cognate of Roland.

Notable people with the surname include:

- Alberto Orlando (born 1938), Italian footballer
- Alessandro Orlando (born 1970), Italian footballer
- Alexandra Orlando (born 1987), Italian-Canadian rhythmic gymnast
- Alfonso Orlando (1892–1969), Italian runner
- Andrea Orlando (born 1969), Italian politician
- Angelo Orlando (born 1965), Italian football coach
- Bo Orlando (born 1966), American football player
- Bobby Orlando (born 1958), American record producer
- David Orlando (born 1971), Swiss footballer
- Davide Orlando (born 1971), Swiss footballer
- Diogo Orlando (born 1983), Brazilian footballer
- Elena Orlando (born 1992), American ice hockey player
- Francesco Orlando (disambiguation)
- Gaetano Orlando (born 1962), Canadian-Italian ice hockey player
- Gino Orlando (1929–2003), Brazilian footballer
- Giovanni Orlando (born 1945), Italian swimmer
- Jeffrey Pullicino Orlando (born 1963), Maltese politician
- Jimmy Orlando (1916–1992), American ice hockey player
- Joe Orlando (1927–1998), Italian-American illustrator
- John Orlando (born 1960), Nigerian footballer
- Johnny Orlando (born 2003), Canadian singer and actor
- Jonathon Orlando (born 1987), American soccer player
- Leoluca Orlando (born 1947), Italian politician
- Luca Orlando (born 1990), Italian footballer
- Luciano Orlando (1887–1915), Italian mathematician
- Massimo Orlando (born 1971), Italian football coach
- Matías Orlando (born 1991), Argentinian rugby union footballer
- Mike Orlando (born 1970), American guitarist
- Muriel Orlando (born 1989), Argentinian footballer
- Orazio Orlando (1937–1990), Italian actor
- Paulo Orlando (born 1985), Brazilian baseball player
- Quentin Orlando (1919–2011), American politician
- Ramón Orlando (born 1959), Dominican singer-songwriter
- Robert Orlando (born 1964), American filmmaker
- Roberto Orlando (disambiguation)
- Ruggero Orlando (1907–1994), Italian journalist
- Silvio Orlando (born 1957), Italian actor
- Silvio Orlando (rugby union) (born 1981), Italian rugby union footballer
- Simone Orlando, Canadian ballet dancer
- Stefania Orlando (born 1966), Italian television personality
- Taddeo Orlando (1885–1950), Italian general
- Todd Orlando (born 1971), American football coach
- Tony Orlando (born 1944), American singer-songwriter
- Valerio Rocco Orlando (born 1978), Italian artist
- Vittorio Emanuele Orlando (1860–1952), Italian politician

== See also ==
- Orlando (given name)
