= Orlando Gutiérrez =

Orlando Gutiérrez may refer to:

- Orlando Gutiérrez-Boronat (born 1965), Cuban author
- Orlando Gutiérrez (Spanish footballer) (born 1976), Spanish footballer for Club Portugalete
- Orlando Gutiérrez (Chilean footballer) (born 1989), Chilean footballer for Ñublense
