= Ismael Miranda =

Puerto Rican musician (born 1950

- Born: Ismael Miranda Carrero; February 20, 1950 (age 76); Aguada, Puerto Rico
- Other names: El Niño Bonito de la Salsa; ("The Pretty Boy of Salsa")
- Occupations: Singer; songwriter
- Parents: Ismael Miranda Aquino (father); Ana Carrero Echevarria (mother)
- Musical career
- Genres: Salsa
- Label: Fania

Ismael Miranda, also known as El Niño Bonito de la Salsa ("The Pretty Boy of Salsa") (born February 20, 1950) is a Puerto Rican singer and songwriter.

== Early years ==
Miranda (birth name: Ismael Miranda Carrero) was born in Aguada, Puerto Rico and grew up in New York City on East 13th Street in Manhattan's East Village. He wanted to become a musician as a child. His musical inclination led him to form two different juvenile groups, "The 4J's and Little Junior" and "The Class Mates" by the time he was eleven years old. He sang and played conga for the group and they appeared on Jerry Lewis's Muscular Dystrophy Telethon. Miranda also grew up and played in his first bands with Jazz percussionist Orlando "Q" Rodriguez and piano player Mark Dimond.

== First recording ==
In 1967, when Miranda was 17 years old, he made his recording debut on the album Let's Ball with Joey Pastrana, and had his first "hit" with "Rumbón Melón". He was then hired as bandleader Larry Harlow's lead singer. That same year Miranda and Harlow co-authored El Exigente The Demanding One), set to the rhythm of Latin Boogaloo.

== The Fania All Stars ==
In 1969, Miranda joined the Fania All Stars and went with the band on tour to Europe, Asia and Latin America. In 1973, he formed his own band called "Orquesta Revelación" and recorded "Así se compone un son" under the Fania record label. He was then baptized as "El Niño Bonito de la Salsa" ('The Pretty Boy of Salsa"). During the 1970s, he continued to have more songs like "Lupe, Lupe", "Señor Sereno".

In 1984, Miranda recorded an album for Fania with the Cuban conjunto Sonora Matancera. By 1988, he had planned to retire. However, he went on to establish his own record label "IM Records" and recorded several boleros with Andy Montañez. By 1992, he signed under the management of Chino Rodríguez in New York City, who negotiated with the late Jerry Masucci on the Fania All-Star Reunion of 1994.

== Later years ==
The 2002 recording of one of Miranda's concerts received the recognition and acclaim of the National Foundation of Popular Culture of Puerto Rico. He also recorded a CD which contained songs composed by Mexican composer José Alfredo Jiménez in the salsa version.

On September 27, 2003, Ismael Miranda performed at the Copacabana nightclub in New York City. He currently continues to perform and is now on a national tour.

During January 23, 2021, Miranda was hospitalized in a Caguas hospital in Puerto Rico, after complaining of severe dizziness.

== Discography ==
With Joey Pastrana & His Orchestra

- Let's Ball (Cotique), 1967

With Larry Harlow / Orchestra Harlow

- El Exigente (Fania Records), 1967
- Presenta A Ismael Miranda (Fania Records), 1968
- Me and My Monkey (Fania Records), 1969
- Electric Harlow (Fania Records), 1970
- Abran Paso! (Fania Records), 1971
- Opportunidad (Fania Records), 1972
- Tribute To Arsenio Rodríguez (Fania Records), 1972
- Con Mi Viejo Amigo (With My Old Friend) (Fania Records), 1976
- The Best of Orchestra Harlow & Ismael Miranda (Fania Records), 1976

With Willie Colón

- Doble Energía (Fania Records) 1980

With Sonora Matancera

- La Sonora y el Niño (Fania Records) 1984

With His Orchestra (Orquesta Revelación)

- Así Se Compone Un Son (1973)
- En Fa Menor (1974)
- Este es... Ismael Miranda (1975)
- No Voy al Festival (1977)
- Sabor, Sentimiento, y Pueblo (1978)
- La Clave del Sabor (1981)
- The Master (1983)
- Una Nueva Visión (1985)
- Por el Buen Camino (1987)
- Motivos de Mi Tierra (1987)
- Felicitándote (1988)
- La Mano Maestra (1989)
- Hasta la Última Gota (1991)
- Entre Sombras (1992)
- Enamorado de Ti (1993)
- El Sabor de Puerto Rico (1994)
- Cantar o No Cantar with Junior Gonzalez (1995)
- Al Son del Bolero with Andy Montañez (1996)
- Con Buena Nota (1997)
- Románticos de Nuevo with Andy Montañez (1997)
- Con Alma de Niño (1998)
- Son de Vieques (1999)
- Vengo Con Todo (2001)
- Tequila y Ron (2003)
- Edición Especial (2005)
- Con Sabor y Sentimiento (2007)
- Buscando el Camino (2008)
- De Regreso al Son (2009)
- Aferrado a Ti (2011)
- Son 45 (2014)

Compilaciones (Compilations)

- El Compositor Que Canta (1978)
- Éxitos de los 50, Vol. 1 (1982)
- Éxitos de los 50, Vol. 2 (1985)
- Fania All Stars: "Live" June 11, 1994, Puerto Rico (1995)
- Fania All-Stars With Ismael Miranda (1996)
- The Best (2001)
- 27 Años de Trayectoria (2002)
- Pura Salsa (2006)
- Pura Salsa Live (2007)
- Romántico (2009)
- Greatest Hits (2009)
- Historia de la Salsa (2010)
- La Herencia (2012)

== See also ==
- List of Puerto Ricans
- Music of Puerto Rico
