= Lisa Delpit =

American educationalist, researcher and author

Lisa D. Delpit is an American educationalist, researcher, and author. She is the former executive director and Eminent Scholar at the Center for Urban Educational Excellence at Florida International University in Miami, Florida, Benjamin E. Mays Chair of Urban Educational Leadership at Georgia State University, and the first Felton G. Clark Distinguished Professor of Education at Southern University and A&M College in Baton Rouge, Louisiana. She earned the MacArthur "Genius" Fellowship for her research on school-community relations and cross-cultural communication.

== Early life and education ==
Lisa Delpit spent her childhood years on Lettsworth St. in "Old South Baton Rouge," the first black settlement in the city. The house in which she lived as a child was built next to the "Chicken Shack," a community restaurant that her father started, she was told, with 46¢ in his pocket. Much of her youth was spent in the kitchen with her father, Thomas Delpit. Delpit recalls a Baton Rouge where her mother could not try on a hat in the department store and where black children were unable to attend school with white children. She remembers black nuns who told her 'Act your age, not your color' because of the then internalized views in society concerning black people. At only the age of seven, when her father died of kidney failure because he had no access to a dialysis machine, Delpit remembers the local hospital having a separate ward for colored patients. She recalls: "When I was growing up, my mother and my teachers in the pre-integration, poor black Catholic school that I attended, corrected every word I uttered in their effort to coerce my black English into sometimes hypercorrect standard English forms acceptable to black nuns in Catholic schools. In elementary school, I diagrammed thousands of sentences, filled in tens of thousands of blanks, and never wrote any text longer than two sentences until I was in the 10th grade of high school". Delpit was one of the first black students to integrate St. Anthony's High School, a Catholic high school.

Delpit attended Antioch College in Ohio, which was known at the time for its radicalism. After she obtained her Bachelor of Science Degree in Education, she was eager to utilize the progressive teaching strategies in her first teaching position at an inner-city open elementary school in Southern Philadelphia. Delpit recalls: "The black kids went to school there because it was their only neighborhood school. The white kids went to school there because their parents had learned the same kinds of things I had learned about education." Dissonance arose in Delpit's teaching when she realized her strategies did not work for all her students; her white students zooming ahead while her black students played games and learned to read, but only much slower than the white kids. When Delpit attended Harvard Graduate School of Education to pursue master's and doctoral degrees in Curriculum, Instruction and Research, she came to understand the importance of students learning to write in meaningful contexts. Delpit went on to explore the novel views acquired about culture and learning by way of a fellowship she received which facilitated her work in Papua New Guinea. Delpit spent approximately one year on the island.

As a scholar, she served on the Commission for Research in Black Education (CORIBE). As a teacher and professor, she worked at Georgia State University GSU, Florida International University College of Education(FIU), and Southern University and A&M College.

Delpit's research has been on elementary education with a focus on language and literacy development. She has researched issues relating to race and access granted to minority groups in education. She is founder of the National Coalition for Quality Education in New Orleans, and co-sponsor and developer of the Conference on Education for Liberation at Georgia State University

Delpit has won awards for her work on teaching and educating urban areas and diverse education systems. In 1990, she was the only educator to win the MacArthur award. Delpit's many awards include the Harvard University Graduate School of Education 1993 Alumni Award for Outstanding Contribution to Education; the 1994 American Educational Research Association Cattell Award for Outstanding Early Career Achievement; a 1998 award from Sesame Street Productions, the Sunny Days award; and the 2001 Kappa Delta Phi Laureate Award for her contribution to the education of teachers.

== Common themes ==
=== The Granting of Students Access to the Culture of Power ===
In one of her most heavily cited works, The Silenced Dialogue: Power and Pedagogy in Educating Other People's Children, Delpit argues the focus on process-oriented as opposed to skills-oriented writing instruction reduces the chances for black children to gain access to the tools required for accessing the "culture of power", which she describes as follows: (1) Issues of power as being enacted in classrooms; (2) Codes or rules established for participation in power, lending credence to the existence of a "culture of power"; (3) Rules of the culture of power being a reflection of the rules adhered to in the culture of those who have power; (4) Understanding explicitly the rules of a culture of power as fundamental to acquisition of the power of that culture; and (5)Tendency of those within the culture of power to be least aware or willing to admit that a culture of power exists. Delpit explores stances taken by teachers towards black children within the classroom and emphasizes how essential it is for teachers, both black and white, to communicate effectively and positively with black students if they are to achieve academic success. She concludes the skills/process debate is fallacious because it subscribes to the view that black and poor children can be categorically organized. Rather, she asserts the need for equipping teachers to communicate across cultures because they give voice to children of color. Giving students a voice contributes to teachers "empowering" students. She suggests that "the teacher can not be the only expert in the room" and students should be able to display their own expert knowledge in the classroom. Delpit also argues that teachers simply "adopting direct instruction is not the answer". Incorporating other instructional methods that better involve students, can help students understand that they have a voice in their own learning process.

=== Preparing teachers for Cultural, Linguistic and Ethnic Diversity ===
In Lessons from Teachers, Delpit emphasizes the importance of teachers altering practices in urban schools. Among the principles identified are the need to teach more and not less content to poor children, ensuring children access to conventions/strategies necessary for succeeding in the context of American society, connecting students' knowledge and experiences from their social contexts to knowledge acquired in the schools and acknowledgement and recognition of students' home cultures. Delpit asserts these principles challenge teachers to revolutionize education by counteracting the negative impact of stereotypical values attached to students of color in the American system.

=== Developing Open-mindedness and Eliminating bias of the "Other" ===
In Educators as "Seed People" Growing a New Future, Delpit discusses the significance of educators taking on positive attitudes towards students of color. She highlights the importance of looking beyond standardized test scores and scripted instructional programs if one is to truly educate all students. Delpit maintains educators can no longer continue to question whether low income students of color are capable, but must instead create rigorous and engaging instruction based on the students' cultural, intellectual, historical and political legacies. She asserts educators have much to learn from pre-integration African-American institutions in which Black intelligence is affirmed and which provide students with the motivation to achieve.

=== Educating "Other People's Children" ===
In "Other People's Children: Cultural Conflict in the Classroom," Delpit discusses how different teaching strategies such as "whole language" and "process not product" are putting non white students at a higher risk for failure. She discusses how certain schools got rid of different things in the school system to try to raise Math and Reading score. They thought that cancelling things like field trips and classes that have to do with English and arts classes, would help raise scores and make the students do better. Another example Delpit focuses on is the need to teach dominant language forms so that all students have access to multiple forms of language. This book talks about how constricting the conversation about education has become and how we can fix that.

=== "Multiplication is for White People" ===
"If we do not recognize the brilliance before us, we cannot help but carry on the stereotypic societal views that these [African-American] children are somehow damaged goods and that they cannot be expected to succeed."- Lisa Delpit In this book, Delpit discusses how African American children can't live up to their full potential because of "society's deeply ingrained bias of equating blackness with inferiority....".

== Awards ==
- Recipient of the MacArthur "Genius" Fellowship - GSU (1990)
- Award-winning author of Other People's Children: Cultural Conflict in the Classroom, The Skin We Speak and The Real Ebonics Debate
- Winner of an American Educational Studies Association Critics' Choice Award and Choice Magazine's Outstanding Academic book award, and voted one of Teacher Magazine's "great books"
- Harvard University Graduate School of Education 1993 Alumni Award for Outstanding Contribution to Education
- 1994 American Educational Research Association Cattell Award for Outstanding Early Career Achievement

- 1998 the Sunny Days Award from Sesame Street Productions
- 2001 Kappa Delta Phi Laureate Award for her contribution to the education of teachers.
- 2002 AACTE Advocate of Justice Award
- 2003 Antioch College Horace Mann Humanity Award
- 2006 Martin Luther King Service Award from Florida International University

== Selected works ==
- Delpit, L. D., & Kemelfield, G. (1985). An evaluation of the viles tok ples skul scheme in the North Solomon's Province. Statistics, 15(4), 168–170.
- Delpit, L. (1986). Skills and other dilemmas of a progressive black educator. Harvard Educational Review, 56(4), 379–386.
- Delpit, L. D. (1988). The silenced dialogue: Power and pedagogy in educating other people's children. Harvard Educational Review, 58(3), 280–299.
- Delpit, L. (1990). Language diversity and learning. In S. Hynds & D.L. Rubin (Eds.), Perspectives on Talk and Learning (pp. 247–266). Urbana, IL: National Council of Teachers of English.
- Delpit, L. D. (1992). Acquisition of literate discourse. Bowing before the master? Theory Into Practice, XXXI(4), 296–302.
- Delpit, L. D. (1992). Education in a multicultural society: Our future's greatest challenge. The Journal of Negro Education, 61(3), 237–249.
- Delpit, L. (1994). Seeing color: A review of White teacher. In B. Bigelow, L. Christensen, S. Karp, B. Miner, & B. Parkerson (Eds.), Rethinking our classrooms: Teaching for equity and justice (pp. 130–131). Milwaukee, WI: Rethinking Schools.
- Delpit, L. (1995). Teachers, culture, and power: An interview with Lisa Delpit. In D. Levine, R. Lowe, B. Peterson & R. Tenorio (Eds.), Rethinking schools: An agenda for change, (pp. 136–147). New York, NY: The New Press.
- Delpit, Lisa. (1995). Other People's Children: Cultural conflict in the classroom. New York, NY: The New Press.
- Delpit, L & Perry, T. (1998). The Real Ebonics Debate: Power, Language, and the Education of African-American Children (Eds.). Boston, MA: Beacon Press.
- Delpit, L. & Dowdy, J. K. (2002). The Skin That we Speak: Thoughts on language and culture in the classroom (Eds.). New York, NY: The New Press.
- Delpit, L. D., & White-Bradley, P. (2003). "Educating or imprisoning the spirit: Lessons from ancient Egypt." Theory into Practice, 42(4), 283–288.
- Delpit, L.D. (2006). "Lessons from teachers." Journal of Teacher Education, 57(3), 220–231.
- Delpit, L. D. (2012). Multiplication is for White People: Raising expectations for other people's children The New Press.
- "Lisa Delpit Says Teachers Must Value Students' Cultural Strengths." Education Week, 24 Feb. 2019.
