= Thwaite, Suffolk =

Village in Suffolk, England

Coordinates: 52.270°N 1.095°E

Thwaite
- Location within Suffolk
- Population: 149 (2011 Census)
- OS grid reference: TM113681
- District: Mid Suffolk
- Shire county: Suffolk
- Region: East
- Country: England
- Sovereign state: United Kingdom
- Post town: EYE
- Postcode district: IP23
- Dialling code: 01449

Thwaite is a rural village in Suffolk, England.

Thwaite is based on and around the A140 road, midway between Suffolk's county town of Ipswich and the city of Norwich, in Norfolk. It forms part of Mid Suffolk district.

The village consists of a Public House (The Bucks Head) which has recently undergone a radical refurbishment, a redundant church, a recently restored 'school room' (used for small gatherings and parish meetings), and a post box. Homes include several thatched cottages interspersed with a number of individual houses, seemingly built during each decade right up to the early 2000s. The community includes a number of farms and maintains close links with neighbouring village of Stoke Ash, which has a post office, village hall and primary school.

In 1910, Isaac Newton Phelps Stokes dismantled a large timber-framed house, formerly the Queens Head, located next to what is now the A140. He transported it in 688 crates from Tilbury docks to the US, where it was reconstructed using the timbers of a wrecked English ship, on a hill overlooking Long Island Sound near Greenwich, Connecticut. It was renamed 'High Low House' - one of its former names whilst standing in Thwaite.

The churchyard contains interesting headstones, not least the cast iron headstone of Orlando Whistlecraft - weather prophet and poet.

== Notable residents ==
- Orlando Whistlecraft (1810–1893), early meteorologist
