= Frank Quintero =

Venezuelan singer-songwriter (born 1952)

- Born: Juan Francisco Quintero Mendoza; November 27, 1952 (age 73); Caracas
- Origin: Venezuela
- Genres: Ballad; Pop; Latin pop; Rock
- Occupations: Singer; songwriter; Drums Player
- Instruments: Drums; Voice; Guitar
- Years active: 1976 – present
- Labels: CBS-Columbia; Sonorodven; Sony Music; Latin Wold; H2Q Records

Frank Quintero (born Juan Francisco Quintero Mendoza ) is a Venezuelan singer-songwriter, guitarist and drummer specialized in pop music.

== Biography ==
Born in Caracas, November 27, 1952 Quintero began playing drums with rock-oriented bands. Eventually, he picked up important experience while performing with jazz and latin groups before getting around to record his first solo album, Después de la tormenta, released in 1976 by the CBS-Columbia label. The highlight of this album is La Dama de la Ciudad, a romantic waltz ballad that became a huge success on the radio and charts.

The next year came his second production, Travesía, a rock-pop production recorded in Caracas, New York City and Trinidad. This production gained a significant support from his followers, which prompted the release of Hechizo in 1978, recorded between Caracas and New York. This time, Quintero added a jazzy touch to the production, incorporating a horns section that included the Brecker Brothers (Randy and Michael), Dave Sanborn and Barry Rogers.

1979 start studies at Berklee College of Music in Boston, Massachusetts, In 1982, he obtained the titles of Musician Performer on Drums and Producer at Berklee, within the mention Professional Musician. That year he returned to Venezuela for continuing to expand his professional life, while sporadically he continued traveling to Los Angeles and New York for the same purpose.

Afterwards, Quintero became a prolific songwriter, band leader and productor, releasing 21 records in a span of 35 years. In between, he also has collaborated with other artists in multiple recordings.

== Discography ==
Year	Studio album	Label	Source
1976	Después de la tormenta	CBS Columbia	
1977	Travesía	CBS Columbia	
1978	Hechizo	CBS Columbia	
1980	De noche y con poca luz	CBS Columbia	
1981	Pájaros y estrellas	CBS Columbia	
1984	A través de mis ojos	CBS Columbia	
1985	La calle del atardecer	Sonorodven	
1987	Hablando a tu sueño	Sonorodven	
1989	Buscando soles	Sonorodven	
1992	Agua dulce	Sony Music	
1994	Frankamente acústico (Unplugged)	Sony Music	
1997	Canciones para mis pequeños amigos	Anes Records	
1999	Bien	Latin World Entertainment Group.	
2002	Signos de admiración	Latin World Entertainment Group	
2003	Celebración	Independent	
2003	Demos	Independent	
2006	De vuelta a la calle del atardecer	IC Records	
2011	Guerreros de Luz	IC Records	
2015	Natural	H2Q Records	
