= The Jammers =

- Origin: United States
- Genres: Garage house, boogie
- Years active: 1982–1984
- Labels: Salsoul (US, UK)

Jammers were an American boogie music group led by Richie Weeks and consisting of the members of Instant Funk, Weeks & Co and various Salsoul Records acts. Their hit song "Be Mine Tonight," composed by singer-songwriter Margaret Blount and producer Richie Weeks, was released in 1982 on Salsoul Records. Often played by DJs along with "And You Know That" from their 1982 album, The Jammers, the dual-single chart listing entered the Billboard Dance charts on November 6, 1982, and peaked at No. 19. "Be Mine Tonight" also hit the R&B chart, peaking at number 76. In the United Kingdom, "Be Mine Tonight" peaked at No. 65 on the UK Singles Chart.

== Group ==
The band's material was provided, produced and arranged by Richie Weeks of club/boogie group Weeks & Co. Shep Pettibone was involved in mixing of their material. Album session musicians include Warren Benbow, Jocelyn Brown and Debbi Blackwell Cook, Sheldon Weeks on lead vocals. Other members include, bass guitarist Raymond Earl, keyboardist Dennis Richardson, and drummer Scotty Miller from Instant Funk and saxophonist Roy Nathanson, members of New York City Strings, salsa trombonist Barry Rogers, jazz trumpeter Earl Gardner.

They recorded three singles ("And You Know That", "Be Mine Tonight", and "Let's B-B Break") and one eponymous album in total.

== Discography ==
=== Album ===
Year	Album	US	UK
1982	The Jammers	—	—
"—" denotes an album that did not chart or was not released in that region.

=== Singles ===
Year	Title	Label	Peak chart positions			
Year	Title	Label	US	U.S. R&B	U.S. Dance	UK
1982	"And You Know That"	Salsoul	—	—	19	—
1982	"Be Mine Tonight"	Salsoul	—	76	19	65
1984	"Let's B-B Break"	Salsoul	—	—	—	—
"—" denotes a single that did not chart or was not released in that region.
