= Orlando "Q" Rodriguez =

American precussionist (born 1947)

Orlando "Q" Rodriguez (born September 13, 1947) is an American rock and jazz percussionist based in New York City. He appeared on the album Live at the House of Tribes by Wynton Marsalis in 2005.

He began his career as a teenager during the early 1960s, playing with Dennis Davis, Ossie Davis, Ruby Dee, Rene McLean, Jackie McLean, Louie Ramirez, and Rod Rogers in Slugs nightclub in New York City. Salsa singer Ismael Miranda was in his first bands with Rodriguez and pianist Mark Diamond.

He has worked with Ashford & Simpson, Walter Becker, Warren Benbow, James Brown, Teddy Charles, Ben E. King, Gloria Lynn, Donald Fagen, Jerry Freidman, Kathie Lee Gifford, Paul Griffin, Jay and the Americans, Aaron Neville, Ralfi Pagan, Victor Paz, Elliott Randall, Max Roach, Barry Rogers, Sam & Dave, Bill Saxton, Paul Shaffer, Frankie Valli, Kenny Vance, Nancy Wilson, and Sam Wooding.

== Discography ==
=== As sideman ===
- Kathie Lee Gifford. Heart of a Woman (Universal)
- Wynton Marsalis. Live at The House of Tribes (Blue Note)
- Kenny Vance. "What a Wonderful world" "Vance 32" 1975 (Collectables)
- Ralfi Pagan. Make it with you "Legend" (Aries Music)
- Jay and the Americans. Keeping the Music Alive (Rockaway)
- Ralpe Roig y Su Orquesta. Oyelo Sonar (MGM)
