= Orlando Jorge =

Orlando Jorge may refer to:

- Orlando Jorge Mera (1966–2022), Dominican Republic minister
- Orlando Jorge Villegas (born 1991), Dominican Republic legislator
