= Orlando Peralta =

Argentine basketball player (1930–2010)

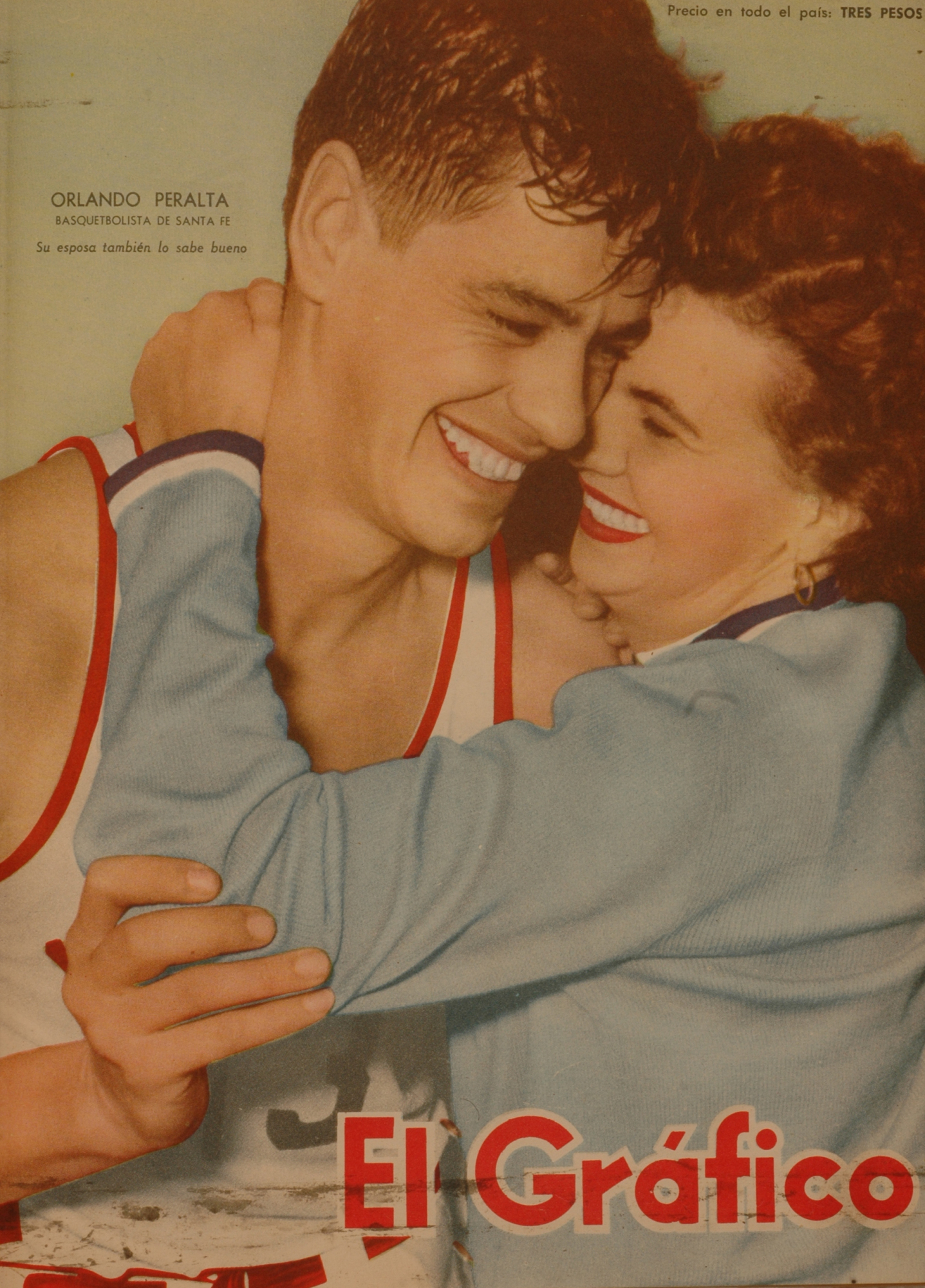
- Peralta in El Gráfico, 1958

Personal information
- Born: 8 February 1930
- Died: 27 November 2010 (aged 80)
Medals
Men's basketball
Representing Argentina
Pan American Games
Silver medal – second place	1951 Buenos Aires	Team
Silver medal – second place	1955 Mexico City	Team

Orlando Amadeo Peralta Dupont (Note: In this Spanish name, the first or paternal surname is Peralta and the second or maternal family name is Dupont.) (8 February 1930 – 27 November 2010) was an Argentine basketball player. He died on 27 November 2010, at the age of 80.
