= Orlando da Costa (footballer) =

Brazilian footballer

Personal information
- Date of birth: 8 August 1985 (age 41)
- Place of birth: São Paulo, Brazil
- Height: 1.75 m (5 ft 9 in)
- Position: Midfielder

Senior career*
| Years | Team | Apps | (Gls) |
| 2007 | Osasco | | |
| 2010–2011 | Union Sidi Kacem | | |
| 2011–2012 | Moghreb Tétouan | | |
| 2012–2013 | Kawkab Marrakech | | |
| 2013–2014 | Concordia Chiajna | 6 | (1) |
| 2014 | Berceni | 4 | (1) |
| 2016–2017 | Louletano | 17 | (3) |
| 2018–2019 | SL Cartaxo | 14 | (0) |
| Total | | 41 | (5) |
- * Club domestic league appearances and goals

Orlando da Costa (born 8 August 1985) is a Brazilian former footballer who played as a midfielder.

== Honours ==
Moghreb Tétouan

- Botola: 2011–12
