= Orlando Gutiérrez-Boronat =

Cuban writer

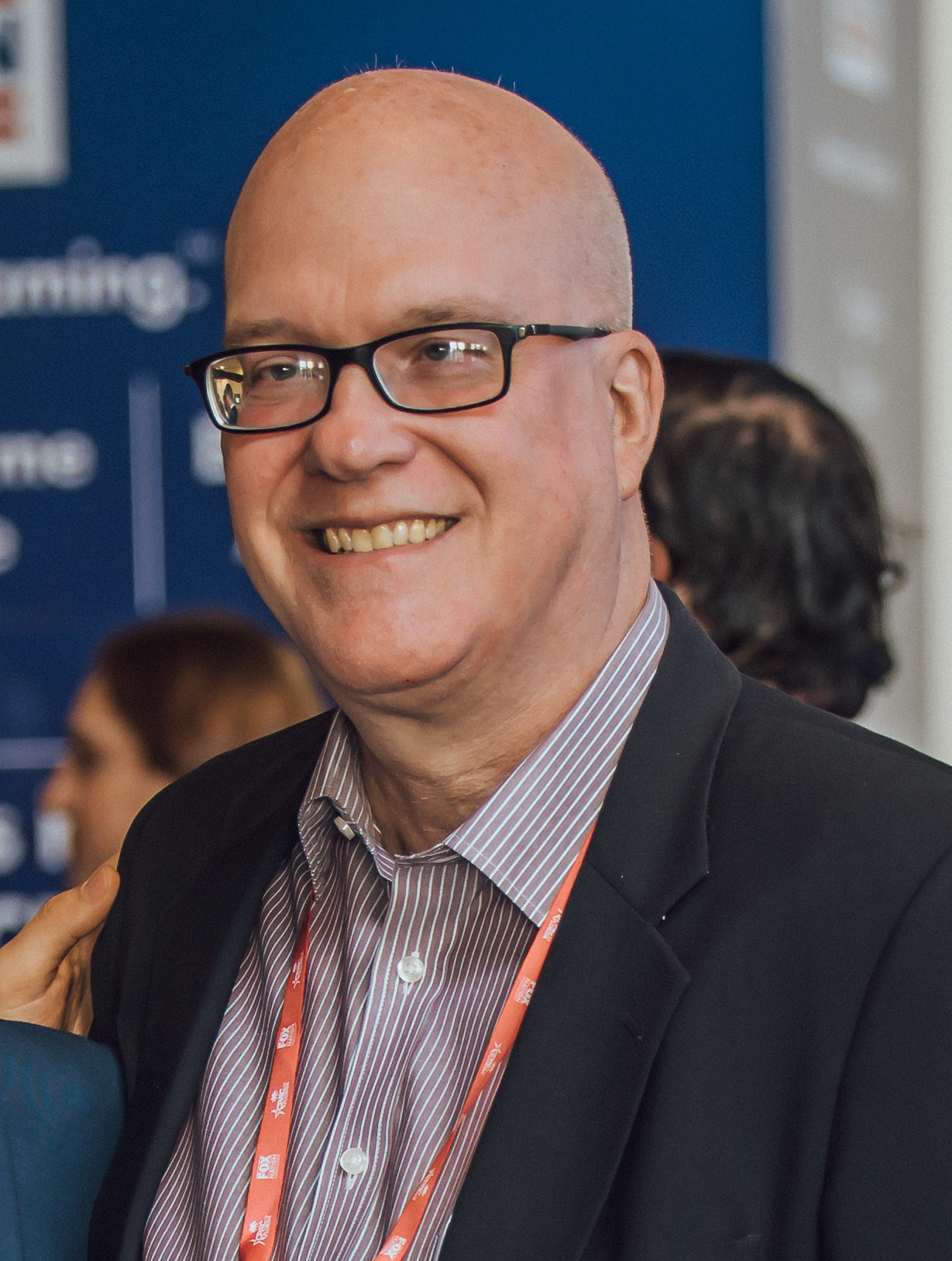
- Born: 1965; Havana
- Education: University of Miami
- Occupations: Writer, visiting scholar
- Website: gutierrezboronat.com

Orlando Gutiérrez-Boronat (born 1965 in Havana, Cuba) is an author, spokesperson for the Cuban Democratic Directorate, member of the Assembly of the Cuban Resistance (a coalition of Cuban anti-communist groups inside and outside Cuba), invited lecturer at Georgetown University, and community leader.

== Biography ==
His family settled in the United States from Cuba in 1971. In 1990, he co-founded Cuban American NGO, Directorio Democratico Cubano "Directorio" seeking human rights and democratic change in Cuba. In 2005, Gutierrez-Boronat launched Radio República, a radio station offering uncensored news and information to Cubans on the island that transmits every day via shortwave, and also through AM frequencies and social media. Radio República recently launched a podcast driven website allowing for programming to be downloaded and heard world-wide. The DDC receives funding from [NED]. The NED funds also went toward the Directorio's Radio Republica operation.

Gutierrez-Boronat holds a PhD in the Philosophy of International Relations from the University of Miami (2005), and a master's degree in Political Science (2001) and undergraduate degrees in Communications and Political Science from Florida International University.

Dr. Gutierrez Boronat has served as an international diplomat for the cause of a Free Cuba. In the past few years, he has met with President Donald J. Trump and Vice President Mike Pence of the United States; with President Jair Bolsonaro of Brazil; with President Tsai-ing wen of the Republic of China (Taiwan); with the Foreign Ministers of Costa Rica, Chile, and Peru; and with members of Congress of the United States and several Latin American countries.

In October 2020, he organized the Anti-Communist and Anti-Socialist Caravan and Seminar in Miami, Florida, that according to observers drew about 30,000 vehicles and thousands of participants.

Dr. Gutierrez-Boronat has been instrumental in the creation of the Justice Cuba Commission, composed of human rights experts from ten countries, which has investigated crimes against humanity of the Cuban government against the Cuban population, as well as in other nations. The Justice Cuba Commission advocates for an international tribunal to try these crimes.

Gutierrez-Boronat signed the Madrid Charter, a document drafted by the conservative Spanish political party Vox that describes left-wing groups as enemies of Ibero-America involved in a "criminal project" that are "under the umbrella of the Cuban regime".
