= Orlando Bareiro =

Paraguayan footballer (born 1978)

Personal information
- Full name: Orlando David Bareiro Milessi
- Date of birth: 13 April 1978 (age 48)
- Place of birth: Asunción, Paraguay
- Position: Forward

Youth career
- Deportivo Recoleta

Senior career*
| Years | Team | Apps | (Gls) |
| 2000 | Libertad | | |
| 2002 | Deportivo Recoleta | | |
| 2003–2004 | Nacional Asunción | 14 | (1) |
| 2004 | Santiago Wanderers | 12 | (3) |
| 2005 | Fernando de la Mora | 5 | (3) |
| 2005–2009 | Crucero del Norte | 82 | (27) |
| 2010 | Sportivo Patria | 13 | (4) |
| 2011 | Fernando de la Mora | | |
| 2012 | Sportivo Trinidense | | |
| 2012 | River Plate Asunción | | |
- * Club domestic league appearances and goals

Orlando David Bareiro Milessi (born 13 April 1978), also known as David Bareiro, is a former Paraguayan footballer who played as a forward for clubs in Chile and Argentina as well as in his native Paraguay.

== Career ==
Besides Paraguay, Bareiro played in Chile for Santiago Wanderers in 2004 and both Crucero del Norte and Sportivo Patria in the Torneo Argentino A.

Following his retirement, he started an eponymous football academy in his homeland.

== Personal life ==
In Argentina, he was known as Pelado Bairero (Bald Bareiro) due to his shaved head.
