= Orlando Airport =

Orlando Airport may refer to:

- Orlando Apopka Airport (X04) – a general aviation airport northwest of Orlando in Apopka, Florida
- Orlando Executive Airport (ORL) – a general aviation and reliever airport east of Orlando city center
- Orlando International Airport (MCO) – the primary commercial service airport for Orlando, Florida
- Melbourne Orlando International Airport (MLB) – a secondary commercial service airport southeast of Orlando in Melbourne, Florida
- Orlando Sanford International Airport (SFB) – a secondary commercial service airport north of Orlando in Sanford, Florida

== See also ==
- Ørland Airport
