= Orlando Garrido =

Orlando Garrido may refer to:

- Orlando H. Garrido (born 1931), Cuban biologist and tennis player
- Orlando Garrido (weightlifter) (1924–2015), Cuban Olympic weightlifter
