= Orlando Whistlecraft =

English meteorologist

- Born: 11 November 1810; Thwaite, Suffolk, England
- Died: 27 February 1893 (aged 82); Thwaite, Suffolk, England
- Education: Robert Burcham Clamp's school
- Spouse: Elizabeth Rush
- Children: Diana, Julia, Orlando, Caroline, Arthur, Amelia
- Scientific career
- Fields: Meteorology

Orlando Whistlecraft (11 November 1810 – 27 February 1893) was an early English meteorologist who was born and died in the village of Thwaite, Suffolk in the East of England. He kept detailed weather records for more than sixty years, and was referred to as 'the weather prophet of Thwaite'. The village sign for Thwaite includes a sun and clouds to commemorate Whistlecraft's work.

== Life ==
Whistlecraft was the son of James Whistlecraft, a farmer, and Susan Brooke. He suffered rheumatic fever as a child, and was paralysed in his right arm, learning to write with his left. He attended school first in Stowmarket then aged 10 at Robert Burcham Clamp's school in St Nicholas Street, Ipswich. Whistlecraft returned to Thwaite in 1829 to run a school. In 1843 he turned to shopkeeping in order to devote more time to his passion for meteorology.

Whistlecraft was referred to as the 'weather prophet of Thwaite'. He was most notable for Whistlecraft's Weather Almanac published annually from 1856 to 1884, and for The Climate of England (1840) and Rural Gleanings (1851). He kept detailed weather records for more than sixty years, beginning when he was nine years old. The National Meteorological Archive in Exeter contains his weather diaries for Thwaite from 1827 to 1892.

In an interviewed published in the East Anglian Daily Times in 1892 he described his motivation for publishing his almanac

I used to study the look of the heavens, and the action of the glass, and so on, and those fortnightly forecasts of mine came so near, so often, that people came to me and said, “You must write an almanac at one”. I used to the pay taxes at Eye in those days and the tax receiver, who came down to London, took the matter up, saying that he would guarantee the purchase of so many copies if the thing were started. Then Mr J M Burton of Ipswich – a bookseller and stationer in a large way of business there – came and said to me “why shouldn't you and I publish and almanac?”.

He is referenced in "Rats", a short story by M. R. James: "so fine was the April of that year—which I have reason to believe was that which Orlando Whistlecraft chronicles in his weather record as the "Charming Year".

Whistlecraft died "in some poverty" on 27 February 1893. He was buried in Thwaite's St George Church on 3 March 1893. His tombstone reads "Orlando Whistlecraft, Weather Prophet & Poet". He is remembered in the Thwaite village sign designed in 2000, which features a sun and clouds.

== Personal life ==
Whistlecraft married Elizabeth Rush, who was born in Stonham Parva, at St George's parish church Thwaite on 28 March 1834. They had six children.
