= Olando =

Olando is a Kenyan surname. Notable people with the surname include:

- Crispin Olando (born 1988), Kenyan international footballer
- Philadelphia Olando (born 1990), Kenyan rugby sevens player

== See also ==
- Orlando, Florida
