= Roberto Orlando =

Roberto Orlando may refer to:

- Roberto Orlando Affonso Júnior (born 1983), Brazilian footballer playing in Hong Kong
- Roberto Orlando (athlete) (born 1995), Italian athlete
