= Francesco Orlando =

Francesco Orlando may refer to:

- Francesco Orlando (critic) (1934–2010), Italian literary critic
- Francesco Orlando (footballer) (born 1996), Italian football player
