= Orlando Bridgeman =

Orlando Bridgeman may refer to:

- Sir Orlando Bridgeman, 1st Baronet, of Great Lever (1606–1674), English Lord Chief Baron of the Exchequer, Chief Justice of the Common Pleas and Lord Keeper of the Great Seal
- Sir Orlando Bridgeman, 1st Baronet, of Ridley (1649–1701), his son, English MP for Horsham
- Sir Orlando Bridgeman, 2nd Baronet (1678–1746), his son, English MP for Coventry, Calne, Lostwithiel, Bletchingley and Dunwich
- Sir Orlando Bridgeman, 4th Baronet (1695–1764), British MP for Shrewsbury
- Orlando Bridgeman, 1st Earl of Bradford (1762–1825), British MP for Wigan, 1784–1800
- Orlando Bridgeman, 3rd Earl of Bradford (1819–1898), British MP for South Shropshire, Vice-Chamberlain of the Household, Lord Chamberlain and Master of the Horse
- Orlando Bridgeman, 5th Earl of Bradford (1873–1957), British soldier and Lord-in-Waiting
- Orlando Bridgeman (1671–1721), English MP for Wigan (UK Parliament constituency), 1698–1701 and 1702–1705
- Orlando Bridgeman (Ipswich MP) (1680–1731), English MP for Ipswich (UK Parliament constituency), 1714–1715
- Orlando Bridgeman (RAF officer) (1898–1931), British World War I flying ace

== See also ==
- Bridgeman (surname)
