= Larry Harlow (musician) =

American musician (1939–2021)

- Born: Lawrence Ira Kahn; March 20, 1939; Brooklyn, New York, U.S.
- Origin: New York City
- Died: August 20, 2021 (aged 82) The Bronx, New York, U.S.
- Genres: Salsa, Charanga, Boogaloo, Latin jazz
- Occupations: Pianist, composer, producer
- Instrument: piano
- Years active: 1960s–2020
- Label: Fania
- Formerly of: Fania All-Stars
- Website: www.larryharlow.com

Larry Harlow (born Lawrence Ira Kahn; March 20, 1939 – August 20, 2021) was an American salsa music pianist, performer, composer, band leader and producer. He was born into a musical American family of Jewish descent.

== Background ==
=== Summary ===
Harlow was born Lawrence Ira Kahn on March 20, 1939, in Brownsville, Brooklyn, the son of Rose (née Sherman; 1910–1975) and Buddy Kahn (né Nathan Kahn; 1909–1981), and brother of Andy Harlow (né Andre H. Kahn; born 1945). His mother was an opera singer with the stage name Rose Sherman in New York. His father was the bandleader at the Latin Quarter in New York under the name Buddy Harlowe.

In 1957, Larry graduated from Music & Arts High School. Harlow was affectionately nicknamed "El Judío Maravilloso" (The Marvelous Jew).

Harlow was a noted salsa bandleader and multi-instrumentalist, although he primarily played piano. He produced over 260 albums for Fania Records as well as his manager and musician friend Chino Rodriguez's two albums for Salsa Records and including his brother Andy's four albums on the Fania stable-mate Vaya Records between 1972 and 1976: Sorpresa La Flauta (VS-14), La Música Brava (VS-24), El Campesino (VS-39), and Latin Fever (VS-59). The first album garnered a gold disc and spawned "La Lotería", the Vaya record company's biggest-selling 45 rpm release to date.

=== Music skills ===
Harlow excelled at an early age at various instruments. The music and culture of New York's Latino community led him to Cuba, where he intensely studied Afro-Cuban music. Harlow, who was known for his innovative blend of Afro-Cuban and jazz styles of piano playing, studied music in the 1950s in Cuba but was unable to complete his degree before the Cuban Revolution forced him to leave the island in 1959. Larry's Orquesta Harlow was the second orchestra signed to the Fania label. Harlow also produced over 106 albums for various artists and over 50 albums on his own, besides the ones he produced for Fania.

Harlow continued to perform with Fania. Among his most popular albums were Abran Paso! and Tribute to Arsenio Rodriguez with Ismael Miranda as the lead singer. Larry's opera Hommy (inspired by the Who's Tommy) was credited as integral to Celia Cruz's comeback (from an early retirement). In other firsts, Harlow was the first piano player for the legendary salsa group known as the Fania All-Stars, generally regarded as the seminal and most-important salsa group to date, and Fania's first record producer. He also appeared with the Fania All-Stars in the movies Our Latin Thing (Nuestra Cosa), Salsa, and Live in Africa. One of the highlights of the film Our Latin Thing is the Orchestra Harlow's 1971 performance of "Abran Paso" in front of an exuberant and dancing audience in East Harlem with a baby-faced Ismael Miranda on vocals.

=== Contributions ===
Among Harlow's further contributions to music was his insistence on creation of a Latin Grammy Award (before the category merged in 2010 with less-specific jazz ones. A year after the trustees who oversee the Grammy Awards cut 31 categories in May 2011, they drew fierce protests from Latin jazz musician Bobby Sanabria, Carlos Santana, Paul Simon and Herbie Hancock among others, and the Grammys Trustees Board voted to reinstate the award for Best Latin Jazz Album in June 2012). Larry Harlow's 1977 salsa suite La Raza Latina, an ambitious history of the Latin music genre created with singer/songwriter Rubén Blades, was nominated for a Grammy Award. Partially in recognition of his early efforts to establish the Latin Grammy categories (which for some years were awarded in a separate ceremony) as well as for his impressive career contributions to the tropical dance music genre (and Harlow's "jazzified" pianistic approach to it), in November 2008 Larry Harlow was presented with the Trustees Award by the Latin Recording Academy.

=== The Latin Legends Band (a.k.a. Latin Legends of Fania) ===
In 1994, at the suggestion of his manager at the time Chino Rodriguez, Larry Harlow teamed up with Ray Barreto, Adalberto Santiago, and cuatro guitar virtuoso Yomo Toro to found the Latin Legends Band, with the aim of both educating Latino and American youth about Latin music heritage and pioneering new ideas in the music, resulting in Larry Harlow's Latin Legends Band 1998. This was from an idea by Barretto, and Harlow and the Latin Legends of Fania band worked around the world. With this same purpose he collaborated with multi-disciplinary artist David Gonzalez in ¡Sofrito!, a spicy stew of folk tales set to salsa, mambo, and jazz rhythms.

In 2005, Harlow contributed to The Mars Volta's album Frances the Mute, on which he played a piano solo toward the end of "L'Via L'Viaquez." He also played piano with the group in some live shows.

=== Awards ===
Larry Harlow was inducted into the International Latin Music Hall of Fame in 2000 and was presented with the Beny Moré Memorial Award by the same organization in 2002. In 2008, Larry Harlow was presented with the Latin Grammy Trustees Award. He also received the Legacy Award at the 2016 La Musa Awards.

Larry Harlow held a BA in Music from Brooklyn College, City University of New York since 1963, and a master's degree in philosophy from the New School of Social Research also in New York City.

=== Latter years and death ===
Prior to his death, Harlow resided in New York with his wife Maria del Carmen Kahn, and regularly continued to lead and perform with Larry Harlow and the Fania Latin Legends.

Harlow died in the Bronx, New York on August 20, 2021, aged 82, due to heart failure while hospitalized for a renal condition.

== Discography ==
- Orchestra Harlow, Heavy Smokin' (Fania LP 331, October 1966)
- Orchestra Harlow, Gettin' Off (Bajándote) (Fania LP 334, 1967)
- Orchestra Harlow, El Exigente (The Demanding One) (with Ismael Miranda) (Fania LP 342, 1967)
- Orchestra Harlow, Presenta a Ismael Miranda (Fania LP 360, 1968)
- Orchestra Harlow, Me and My Monkey (with Ismael Miranda) (Fania LP 374, 1969)
- Orchestra Harlow, Electric Harlow (with Ismael Miranda) (Fania LP 385, 1970)
- Ambergris, Ambergris (Paramount PAS-5014, 1970)
- Orchestra Harlow, Abran Paso! (with Ismael Miranda) (Fania LP 396, 1971)
- Orchestra Harlow, Tribute to Arsenio Rodríguez (with Ismael Miranda) (Fania LP 404, 1971)
- Orchestra Harlow, Harlow's Harem (Fania LP 408, 1971) compilation
- Orchestra Harlow, Oportunidad (with Ismael Miranda) (Fania LP 419, 1972)
- Frankie Dante & Orquesta Flamboyan Con Larry Harlow (Cotique CS-1071, 1972)
- Orchestra Harlow, Hommy: A Latin Opera (Fania LP 425, 1973)
- Orchestra Harlow, Salsa (Fania LP 460, 1974)
- Orchestra Harlow, Live in Quad (Fania LP 472, 1974)
- Orchestra Harlow, El Judío Maravilloso (The Marvelous Jew) (Fania LP 490, 1975)
- Orchestra Harlow, Con Mi Viejo Amigo (With My Old Friend) (with Ismael Miranda) (Fania LP 494, 1976)
- Orchestra Harlow, The Best of Orchestra Harlow & Ismael Miranda (Fania LP 496, 1976) compilation
- Orchestra Harlow, El Jardinero Del Amor (with Junior González) (Fania LP 499, 1976)
- Orchestra Harlow, La Raza Latina: A Salsa Suite (with Rubén Blades) (Fania LP 516, 1977)
- Larry Harlow, Presents 'Latin Fever' (Fania LP 527, 1978)
- Orchestra Harlow, El Albino Divino (with Nestor Sanchez) (Fania LP 533, 1978)
- Orchestra Harlow, Rumbambola (Fania LP 543, 1979)
- Larry Harlow, La Responsabilidad (with Fausto Rey) (Fania LP 551, 1979)
- Orchestra Harlow, El Dulce Aroma Del Éxito (Fania LP 566, 1980)
- Larry Harlow, Our Latin Feeling (Nuestro Sentimiento Latino) (with Junior González) (Fania LP 586, 1980)
- Larry Harlow, Así Soy Yo (Coco Records CLP-160, 1981)
- Larry Harlow, Yo Soy Latino (Fania LP 607, 1983)
- Larry Harlow, Señor Salsa (Tropical Budda Records TBLP-007, 1984)
- Andy & Larry Harlow (Salsa Brothers), The Miami Sessions (Songo Records SR-1001, 1988)
- Larry Harlow, My Time is Now (Mi Tiempo Llego) (Cache Records AM-002, 1990)
- Larry Harlow's Latin Legends Band, 1998 (Masucci Music CDZ 82449, 1998)
- Larry Harlow, Romance En Salsa (Caiman Music/K-Tel 13853-2908-2, 1999)
- Larry Harlow and the Latin Legends Band, ¡Sofrito! (with David Gonzalez) (Laughing Horse Records LHR-1009, 2000)
- Larry Harlow's Latin Jazz Encounter, Live at Birdland (Latin Cool Records LCP-1001, 2003)
- Orchestra Harlow, The Best (Fania CD 787, 2004) compilation
- Larry Harlow's Latin Legends of Fania, 40th Anniversary Live Concert (Eye Music Network ID3771EO, 2006)
- Larry Harlow, La Herencia (Fania/Emusica/UMG 773 130 270, 2007) compilation
- Orquesta Harlow, Selecciones Fania (Fania/Vene Music/Universal Music Latino 278 654 230, 2011) compilation
- Larry Harlow & Marlow Rosado, Harlow & Marlow, Volume One: Passing the Torch (Biviria Music 1068, 2016)

== Filmography ==
- Our Latin Thing (Fania 1972)
- Salsa (Fania, 1974)
- Celia Cruz and the Fania All Stars: In Africa (Fania, 1993)
- "Live" June 11, 1994, Puerto Rico (Fania, 1995)
- Larry Harlow's Latin Legends Of Fania: 40th Anniversary Live Concert (Eye Music Network/Image Entertainment ID3770EODVD, 2006)
- Soul Power (2009)

== Gallery ==
Harlow's partial CD collection at Radio Voz WVOZ Puerto Rico (2006)
