= Orlando Sánchez =

Orlando Sánchez may refer to:

- Orlando Sánchez (baseball) (born 1956), Puerto Rican baseball player and manager
- Orlando Sánchez (basketball) (born 1988), Dominican basketball player
- Orlando Sanchez (politician) (born 1957), American politician
- Orlando Sanchez (fighter) (1982–2022), American Brazilian jiu-jitsu and MMA fighter
