= Orlando Rodrigues (sailor) =

Portuguese sailor

Personal information
- Nationality: Portuguese
- Born: 13 August 1932 Luanda, Angola
- Died: 10 February 2000 (aged 67)

Sport
- Sport: Sailing

Orlando Rodrigues (13 August 1932 – 10 February 2000) was a Portuguese sailor. He competed in the Flying Dutchman event at the 1968 Summer Olympics.
