= Chino Rodriguez =

Latin American musician and impresario

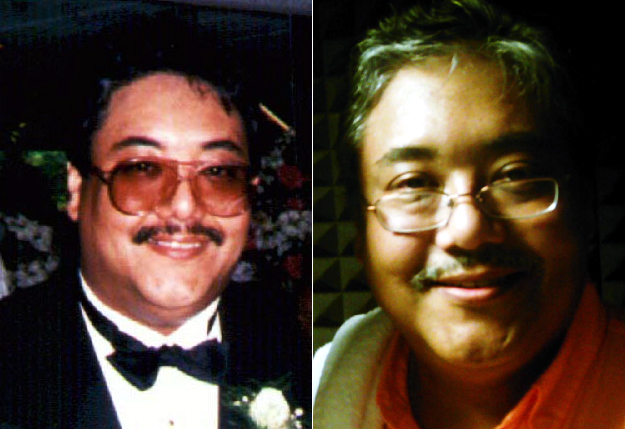

Background information
- Born: James Mui; February 2, 1954; Manhattan, New York City, U.S
- Died: November 5, 2022 (aged 68)
- Genres: Salsa, Latin jazz
- Occupations: Trombonist, impresario
- Instrument: Trombone
- Years active: 1965–2022
- Labels: SALSA / Mary Lou Records, Oriente Music Group
- Website: Latin Music Booking Oriente Music Group (OMG)

James Mui, known professionally as Chino Rodriguez (February 2, 1954 — November 5, 2022), was an American musician and impresario who specialized in Latin music, salsa and Latin jazz.

== Biography ==
Rodriguez was born as James Mui on February 2, 1954 in the Little Italy/Chinatown area of Manhattan, New York City, to a Chinese father, Chueng Mui (Chinese: 梅莊, Méi Zhuāng), who obtained U.S. citizenship by joining the Merchant Marines during World War II, and a third-generation Puerto Rican mother, Gloria Figueroa Rodríguez.

== Early music career ==
Rodriguez studied music at Junior High School 65 on the Lower East Side of Manhattan. In his late teens, he joined Orchestra Dee Jay in Brooklyn, originally as a band boy, then later as an occasional coro (chorus) singer. He formed his first band, Chino Rodriguez and his Orchestra, 1968–69, playing at weddings, birthdays, and private parties. Through the local musician's union, American Federation of Musicians 802, he found work playing music for the New York City Department of Parks arts program, from 1970-74.

== Recording career ==
Rodriguez recorded two albums for Ismael Maisonave's label, Salsa Records: Maestro De Kung-Fu, produced by Andy Harlow, and Si Te Vas Mi China, produced by Larry Harlow.

Chino onstage with Jose Rodriguez and Lewis Kahn, early 1970s

Maestro de Kung-Fu contained "La Computadora", the first Latin recording using a MOOG synthesizer, played by Larry Harlow. Cuban pianist Alfredo Rodriguez played on "Moonlight Serenade." Chino Rodriguez y La Consagración was nominated for Latin New York Magazine's award for Best New Band. Rodriguez's second album, Si Te Vas Mi China, was recorded in 1976 after a year's worth of daily rehearsals. It produced two hits upon its release in 1977 and, like his debut album, achieved gold status.

== Latin music impresario ==
Rodriguez began working part-time at Fania Records as a teenager, when Fania was about to purchase Salsa Records. At the record label, Chino Rodriguez recorded and began helping with the booking of the Fania All-Stars. Later, he worked as an independent booking agent representing many of the Fania artists.

He returned to the business side of the music industry in 1991, becoming Senior Vice President and General Manager of the newly formed Hidden Faces Records. After organizing business operations for Hidden Faces, he opened his own artist management company, Chino Rodriguez Management (C.R.M.), and booking agency, OMNI Latino Entertainment (OLE). His offices were opened in Brooklyn, New York. In 2011, Rodriguez represented Latin hip hop artists Proyecto Uno, bachata artist Domenic Marte, reggaetón duo Edgardo y D'niel, and bachata artist Alfred Martinez. Chino presently worked with many reggaetón and rap artists and lived in Florida.

== Discography ==
- Maestro De Kung-Fu, SALSA Records, 1976. Re-released on CD in 2004 by Mary Lou/SALSA Records.
- Si Te Vas Mi China, SALSA Records, 1977. Re-released on CD in 2004 by Mary Lou/SALSA Records.

== Sources ==
- Flores, Juan. From Bomba to Hip Hop: Puerto Rican Culture and Latino Identity. New York: Columbia University Press, 2000; ISBN 978-0-231-11077-8
- Leymarie, Isabelle. Cuban Fire: The Story of Salsa and Latin Jazz. New York: Continuum International Publishing Group, 2002; ISBN 978-0-8264-6566-5
- Washburne, Christopher. Sounding Salsa: Performing Latin Music in New York City. Philadelphia: Temple University Press, 2008; ISBN 978-1-59213-316-1
