= Florida International University College of Education =

FIU College of Education
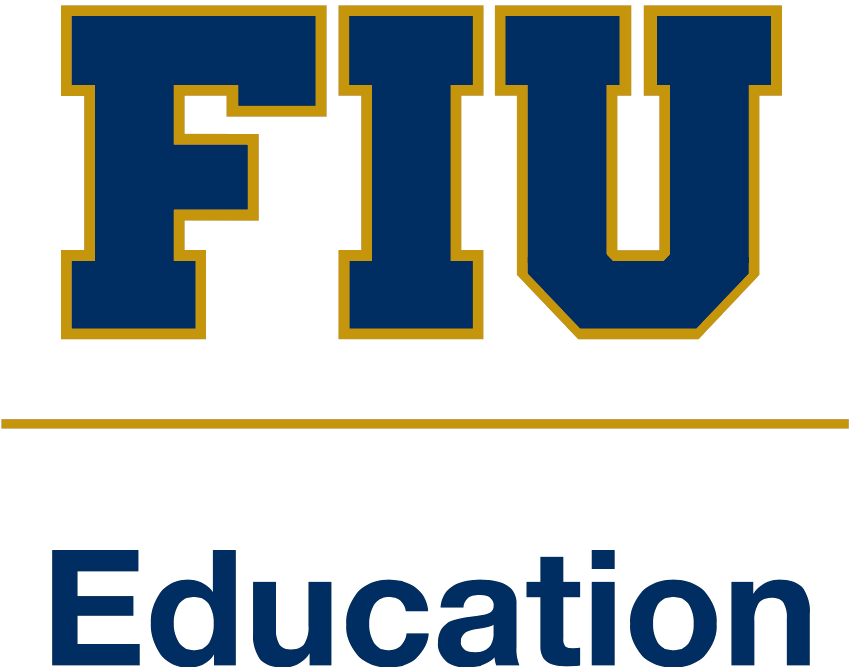
- Type: Public
- Established: 1965
- Dean: Delia C. García
- Students: 2,807 (Fall 2009)
- Location: Miami, Florida, U.S.
- Website: education.fiu.edu

The Florida International University College of Education, located in Miami, Florida in the United States is one of the university's 26 schools and colleges and was founded in 1965. The College of Education offers over 15 undergraduate degrees and over 40 graduate degrees all housed within the college's two departments.

The two departments are:

Teaching and Learning
Leadership and Professional Studies

== Facilities ==
The College resides in the Sanford and Dolores Ziff and Family Building or most commonly known as the Ziff Education Building. The Ziff Building contains all of the college's classroom, research and resource facilities as well as the college's administrative offices.
