= 1890 in paleontology =

List of years in paleontology	(table)
- … 1880; 1881; 1882; 1883; 1884; 1885; 1886; 1887; 1888; 1889; 1890; 1891; 1892; 1893; 1894; 1895; 1896; 1897; 1898; 1899; 1900 …
- In science 1887 1888 1889 1890 1891 1892 1893
- Art; Archaeology; Architecture; Literature; Music; Philosophy; Science; +...

Paleontology or palaeontology is the study of prehistoric life forms on Earth through the examination of plant and animal fossils. This includes the study of body fossils, tracks (ichnites), burrows, cast-off parts, fossilised feces (coprolites), palynomorphs and chemical residues. Because humans have encountered fossils for millennia, paleontology has a long history both before and after becoming formalized as a science. This article records significant discoveries and events related to paleontology that occurred or were published in the year 1890.

== Plants ==
=== Angiosperms ===
Name	Novelty	Status	Authors	Age	Type locality	Location	Notes	Images
Carpolithes dentatus	Sp nov	jr synonym	Penhallow (in Dawson)	Eocene; Ypresian	Okanagan Highlands "Stump lake", Coldwater Beds	Canada; British Columbia	A small betulaceous fruit; moved to Palaeocarpinus dentatus in 2003	
Comptonia columbiana	Sp nov	valid	Dawson	Eocene; Ypresian	Okanagan Highlands; Allenby Formation	Canada; British Columbia	A Sweet fern	Comptonia columbiana

=== Pteridophyta ===
Name	Novelty	Status	Authors	Age	Type locality	Location	Notes	Images
Azollophyllum primaevum	Sp nov	jr synonym	Penhallow	Ypresian	Allenby Formation	Canada	moved to Azolla primaeva in 1955	Azolla primaeva

== Arthropods ==
=== Insects ===
Name	Novelty	Status	Authors	Age	Type locality	Location	Notes	Images
Cymatomera maculata	Sp nov	Jr synonym	Scudder	Late Eocene	Florissant Formation	United States; Colorado	A palaeorehniid ensiferan. Synonymized with Palaeorehnia maculata in 1908	Palaeorehnia maculata
Florissantia	gen et sp nov	Valid	Scudder	Late Eocene	Florissant Formation	United States; Colorado	A dictyopharine planthopper. Type species F. elegans	Florissantia elegans
Telmatrechus	Gen et sp et comb nov	Valid	Scudder	Early Eocene; Ypresian	Eocene Okanagan Highlands; Allenby Formation	Canada; British Columbia	A gerrine water strider genus. Type species is Hygrotrechus stali (1879); Includes the new species T. parallelus. Synonymized into Gerris (1910); Resurrected as a valid genus in 1998.	Telmatrechus parallelus

== Archosauromorphs ==
=== Pseudosuchians ===
Name	Novelty	Status	Authors	Age	Type locality	Location	Notes	Images
Suchodus	Gen et sp nov	Valid	Lydekker	Middle Jurassic (Callovian)	Oxford Clay Formation	UK	A metriorhynchid thalattosuchian, type species S. durobrivensis	Suchodus brachyrhynchus

=== Dinosaurs ===
Taxon	Novelty	Status	Author(s)	Age	Unit	Location	Notes	Images
Barosaurus	Gen. et sp. nov.	Valid	Marsh	Kimmeridgian-Tithonian	Morrison Formation	South Dakota	A diplodocid	
Ceratops paucidens	Comb. nov.	Nomen dubium	Marsh	Maastrichtian	Laramie Formation	Wyoming	A new combination for Hadrosaurus paucidens	
Claosaurus	Gen. nov.	Valid	Marsh	Santonian	Niobrara Formation	Kansas	A new genus for Hadrosaurus agilis	
Ornithomimus	Gen. et sp. nov.	Valid	Marsh	Maastrichtian	Laramie Formation	Colorado	An ornithomimid	
Trachodon longiceps	Sp. nov.	Nomen dubium	Marsh	Maastrichtian	Laramie Formation	Wyoming	A species of Trachodon	
Triceratops prorsus	Sp. nov.	Jr. synonym	Marsh	Maastrichtian	Laramie Formation	Wyoming	A species of Triceratops	
Triceratops serratus	Sp. nov.	Jr. synonym	Marsh	Maastrichtian	Laramie Formation	Wyoming	A species of Triceratops	
Triceratops sulcatus	Sp. nov.	Jr. synonym	Marsh	Maastrichtian	Laramie Formation	Wyoming	A species of Triceratops	

== Sauropterygia ==
=== Nothosauroidea ===
Name	Novelty	Status	Authors	Age	Type locality	Location	Notes	Images
Anarosaurus	Gen et sp nov	Valid	Dames	Middle Triassic	Lower Muschelkalk	Germany	A pachypleurosaur. Type species B. pumilio	Anarosaurus heterodontus
