= 1888 in paleontology =

List of years in paleontology	(table)
- … 1878; 1879; 1880; 1881; 1882; 1883; 1884; 1885; 1886; 1887; 1888; 1889; 1890; 1891; 1892; 1893; 1894; 1895; 1896; 1897; 1898 …
- In science 1885 1886 1887 1888 1889 1890 1891
- Art; Archaeology; Architecture; Literature; Music; Philosophy; Science; +...

Paleontology or palaeontology is the study of prehistoric life forms on Earth through the examination of plant and animal fossils. This includes the study of body fossils, tracks (ichnites), burrows, cast-off parts, fossilised feces (coprolites), palynomorphs and chemical residues. Because humans have encountered fossils for millennia, paleontology has a long history both before and after becoming formalized as a science. This article records significant discoveries and events related to paleontology that occurred or were published in the year 1888.

== Newly named plants ==
Name	Status	Authors	Notes
Aachenosaurus	Nomen dubium	Smets	Misidentified piece of petrified wood.

== Dinosaurs ==
- Richard Lydekker published a catalogue of reptiles in the British Museum of Natural History, their collection information, and their classification.

=== New taxa ===
Taxon	Novelty	Status	Author(s)	Age	Unit	Location	Notes	Images
Allosaurus medius	Sp. nov.	Nomen dubium	Marsh	Albian	Arundel Formation	Maryland	A species of Allosaurus	
Ceratops montanus	Gen. et sp. nov.	Nomen dubium	Marsh	Maastrichtian	Laramie Formation	Montana	Preoccupied by Rafinesque, 1815. Later unnecessarily renamed Proceratops	
Coelurus gracilis	Sp. nov.	Nomen dubium	Marsh	Albian	Arundel Formation	Maryland	A species of Coelurus	
Cumnoria	Gen. nov.	Valid	Seeley	Kimmeridgian	Kimmeridge Clay Formation	England	A new genus for Iguanodon prestwichii	
Iguanodon dawsoni	Sp. nov.	Valid	Richard Lydekker	Barremian	Wadhurst Clay Formation	England	Later given the genus name Barilium	
Ornithopsis manseli	Sp. nov.	Nomen dubium	Lydekker	Kimmeridgian	Kimmeridge Clay Formation	England	A species for "Ischyrosaurus" Hulke, 1874	
Pleurocoelus nanus	Gen. et sp. nov.	Nomen dubium	Marsh	Albian	Arundel Formation	Maryland	A sauropod possibly synonymous with Astrodon	
Pleurocoelus altus	Sp. nov.	Nomen dubium	Marsh	Albian	Arundel Formation	Maryland	A species of Pleurocoelus	
Priconodon crassus	Gen. et sp. nov.	Nomen dubium	Marsh	Albian	Arundel Formation	Maryland	A nodosaurid	
Sphenospondylus gracilis	Sp. nov.	Nomen dubium	Lydekker	Barremian	Wessex Formation	England	A species for Sphenospondylus	
Trachodon cantabrigiensis	Sp. nov.	Nomen dubium	Lydekker	Albian	Cambridge Greensand	England	A species of Trachodon	

== Birds ==
=== New taxa ===
Name	Status	Authors	Notes
Neochen pugil	Valid	Oluf Winge	

== Plesiosaurs ==
=== Newly named plesiosaurs ===
Name	Status	Authors	Location	Images
Trinacromerum	Valid	Cragin	Canada (Manitoba); USA (Colorado, Kansas, Texas and Utah)	Trinacromerum.

== Synapsids ==
=== Non-mammalian ===
Name	Status	Authors	Age	Location	Images
Palaeohatteria	Valid	Credner			
Phocosaurus	Valid	Seeley			
