= 1887 in paleontology =

List of years in paleontology	(table)
- … 1877; 1878; 1879; 1880; 1881; 1882; 1883; 1884; 1885; 1886; 1887; 1888; 1889; 1890; 1891; 1892; 1893; 1894; 1895; 1896; 1897 …
- In science 1884 1885 1886 1887 1888 1889 1890
- Art; Archaeology; Architecture; Literature; Music; Philosophy; Science; +...

Paleontology or palaeontology is the study of prehistoric life forms on Earth through the examination of plant and animal fossils. This includes the study of body fossils, tracks (ichnites), burrows, cast-off parts, fossilised feces (coprolites), palynomorphs and chemical residues. Because humans have encountered fossils for millennia, paleontology has a long history both before and after becoming formalized as a science. This article records significant discoveries and events related to paleontology that occurred or were published in the year 1887.

== Lepidosaurs ==
Name	Status	Authors	Age	Unit	Location	Notes
Patricosaurus	Nomen dubium	Harry Govier Seeley	Middle Cretaceous (late Albian to early Cenomanian)	Cambridge Greensand	UK	An indeterminate lepidosaur.

== Archosaurs ==
=== Classification Events ===
- Harry Govier Seeley divides the Dinosaurs into two taxa based on the configuration of their hip bones.

=== Newly named dinosaurs ===
Name	Status	Authors	Age	Unit	Location	Notes	Images
Aristosuchus	Valid	Harry Govier Seeley	Early Cretaceous (Barremian)	Wessex Formation	UK	A compsognathid.	Aristosuchus
Ornithodesmus	Valid	Harry Govier Seeley	Early Cretaceous (Barremian)	Wessex Formation	UK	A member of Paraves.	

== Plesiosaurs ==
=== New taxa ===
Name	Status	Authors	Notes
Orophosaurus	Nomen dubium	Cope	
Piptomerus	Synonym of Cimoliasaurus	Cope	

== Plants ==
The Fossil Grove was discovered in Glasgow, Scotland. It contains the fossilised stumps of eleven extinct Lepidodendron trees, which are sometimes described as "giant club mosses" but they may be more closely related to quillworts.

== Paleontologists ==
- Death of George Bax Holmes, a wealthy fossil collector who collaborated with Sir Richard Owen. His collection remains preserved in Brighton's Booth Museum of Natural History.
