= 1889 in paleontology =

List of years in paleontology	(table)
- … 1879; 1880; 1881; 1882; 1883; 1884; 1885; 1886; 1887; 1888; 1889; 1890; 1891; 1892; 1893; 1894; 1895; 1896; 1897; 1898; 1899 …
- In science 1886 1887 1888 1889 1890 1891 1892
- Art; Archaeology; Architecture; Literature; Music; Philosophy; Science; +...

Paleontology or palaeontology is the study of prehistoric life forms on Earth through the examination of plant and animal fossils. This includes the study of body fossils, tracks (ichnites), burrows, cast-off parts, fossilised feces (coprolites), palynomorphs and chemical residues. Because humans have encountered fossils for millennia, paleontology has a long history both before and after becoming formalized as a science. This article records significant discoveries and events related to paleontology that occurred or were published in the year 1889.

== Dinosaurs ==
Taxon	Novelty	Status	Author(s)	Age	Unit	Location	Notes	Images
Anchisaurus major	Sp. nov.	Jr. synonym	Marsh	Hettangian	Portland Formation	Connecticut	A species of Anchisaurus now a synonym of Anchisaurus polyzelus	
Calamospondylus foxi	Gen. et sp. nov.	Preoccupied	Lydekker	Barremian	Wessex Formation	England	Preoccupied by Fox vide [Anonymous] 1866. Renamed Calamosaurus	
Ceratops horridus	Sp. nov.	Valid	Marsh	Maastrichtian	Laramie Formation	Wyoming	A species of Ceratops now named Triceratops horridus	
Ceratops alticornis	Comb. nov.	Nomen dubium	Marsh	Maastrichtian	Laramie Formation	Colorado	A reassignment of Bison alticornis to Ceratops following reidentification of the age	
Coelophysis	Gen. nov.	Valid	Cope	Rhaetian	Chinle Formation	New Mexico	A new genus for Coelurus bauri	
Cryptodraco	Gen. nov.	Jr. synonym	Lydekker	Oxfordian	Oxford Clay Formation	England	Unnecessary replacement name for Cryptosaurus	
Hadrosaurus breviceps	Sp. nov.	Nomen dubium	Marsh	Maastrichtian	Laramie Formation	Montana	A species of Hadrosaurus	
Hadrosaurus paucidens	Sp. nov.	Nomen dubium	Marsh	Maastrichtian	Laramie Formation	Montana	A species of Hadrosaurus	
Monoclonius fissus	Sp. nov.	Nomen dubium	Cope	Campanian	Judith River Formation	Montana	A species of Monoclonius	
Monoclonius recurvicornis	Sp. nov.	Nomen dubium	Cope	Campanian	Judith River Formation	Montana	A species of Monoclonius	
Monoclonius sphenocerus	Sp. nov.	Nomen dubium	Cope	Campanian	Judith River Formation	Montana	A species of Monoclonius	
Morosaurus agilis	Sp. nov.	Valid	Marsh	Kimmeridgian	Morrison Formation	Colorado	A species of Morosaurus, now Smitanosaurus agilis	
Morosaurus lentus	Sp. nov.	Valid	Marsh	Kimmeridgian	Morrison Formation	Wyoming	A species of Morosaurus, now Camarasaurus lentus	
Nodosaurus textilis	Gen. et sp. nov.	Valid	Marsh	Cenomanian	Frontier Formation	Wyoming	A club-less ankylosaur	
Orinosaurus	Gen. nov.	Jr. synonym	Lydekker	Norian	Elliot Formation	South Africa	Unnecessary replacement name for Orosaurus	
Pteropelyx grallipes	Gen. et sp. nov.	Nomen dubium	Cope	Maastrichtian	Laramie Formation	Montana	A hadrosaurid	
Triceratops	Gen. nov.	Valid	Marsh	Maastrichtian	Laramie Formation	Wyoming	A new genus for Ceratops horridus	
Triceratops flabellatus	Sp. nov.	Jr. synonym	Marsh	Maastrichtian	Laramie Formation	Wyoming	A species of Triceratops now a synonym of Triceratops horridus	
Triceratops galeus	Sp. nov.	Jr. synonym	Marsh	Maastrichtian	Laramie Formation	Colorado	A species of Triceratops now a synonym of Triceratops horridus	

== Plesiosaurs ==
=== New taxa ===
Name	Status	Authors	Notes
Peloneustes	Valid	Lydekker	
