= 1882 in paleontology =

List of years in paleontology	(table)
- … 1872; 1873; 1874; 1875; 1876; 1877; 1878; 1879; 1880; 1881; 1882; 1883; 1884; 1885; 1886; 1887; 1888; 1889; 1890; 1891; 1892 …
- In science 1879 1880 1881 1882 1883 1884 1885
- Art; Archaeology; Architecture; Literature; Music; Philosophy; Science; +...

Paleontology or palaeontology is the study of prehistoric life forms on Earth through the examination of plant and animal fossils. This includes the study of body fossils, tracks (ichnites), burrows, cast-off parts, fossilised feces (coprolites), palynomorphs and chemical residues. Because humans have encountered fossils for millennia, paleontology has a long history both before and after becoming formalized as a science. This article records significant discoveries and events related to paleontology that occurred or were published in the year 1882.

== Diapsids ==
=== Newly named choristoderes ===
Name	Status	Authors	Location	Notes
Actiosaurus	Nomen dubium	Sauvage	France	A choristodere.

=== Newly named ichthyosaurs ===
Name	Status	Authors	Notes
Rachitrema	Nomen dubium	Sauvage	An ichthyosaur.

=== Newly named dinosaurs ===
Name	Status	Authors	Location	Notes
Amphisaurus	Preoccupied.	Othniel Charles Marsh		Preoccupied by Barkas, 1870. Later renamed Anchisaurus.
Sphenospondylus	Nomen dubium	Harry Govier Seeley		An iguanodont.
Thecospondylus	Nomen dubium	Harry Govier Seeley	UK	

== Synapsids ==
=== Non-mammalian ===
Name	Status	Authors	Age	Location	Notes	Images
Edaphosaurus	Valid	Cope	280 Million of years ago	Czech Republic; Germany; USA (New Mexico, Oklahoma, Texas and West Virginia)	a Sail-Backed ProtoMammal.	Edaphosaurus

== Paleontologists ==
- The fossil collection of the recently deceased Reverend William Fox, which contained over 500 specimens, was bought by the trustees of the British Museum of Natural History.
