= 1880 in paleontology =

List of years in paleontology	(table)
- … 1870; 1871; 1872; 1873; 1874; 1875; 1876; 1877; 1878; 1879; 1880; 1881; 1882; 1883; 1884; 1885; 1886; 1887; 1888; 1889; 1890 …
- In science 1877 1878 1879 1880 1881 1882 1883
- Art; Archaeology; Architecture; Literature; Music; Philosophy; Science; +...

Paleontology or palaeontology is the study of prehistoric life forms on Earth through the examination of plant and animal fossils. This includes the study of body fossils, tracks (ichnites), burrows, cast-off parts, fossilised feces (coprolites), palynomorphs and chemical residues. Because humans have encountered fossils for millennia, paleontology has a long history both before and after becoming formalized as a science. This article records significant discoveries and events related to paleontology that occurred or were published in the year 1880.

== Ichthyosaurs ==
Name	Novelty	Status	Authors	Age	Type locality	Location	Notes	Images
Baptanodon	Gen et comb nov	valid	Marsh	Late Jurassic (Oxfordian)	Sundance Formation	United States; Wyoming	Moved from "Sauranodon" natans Marsh, 1879.	Baptanodon natans

== Pterosaurs ==
Name	Status	Authors	Age	Unit	Location	Notes
Cretornis	Valid	Fritsch	middle Cretaceous (early Turonian)	Jizera Formation	Czech Republic	A member of Azhdarchoidea.
Rhamphocephalus	Valid	Seeley	Middle Jurassic (Bathonian)	Taynton Limestone Formation	England	A rhamphorhynchoid.

== Synapsids ==
=== Non-mammalian ===
Name	Status	Authors	Age	Unit	Location	Notes	Images
Stereorhachis	Nomen dubium	Gaudry	Late Carboniferous	Coal deposits	France	A member of Eothyrididae.	
