= 1884 in paleontology =

List of years in paleontology	(table)
- … 1874; 1875; 1876; 1877; 1878; 1879; 1880; 1881; 1882; 1883; 1884; 1885; 1886; 1887; 1888; 1889; 1890; 1891; 1892; 1893; 1894 …
- In science 1881 1882 1883 1884 1885 1886 1887
- Art; Archaeology; Architecture; Literature; Music; Philosophy; Science; +...

Paleontology or palaeontology is the study of prehistoric life forms on Earth through the examination of plant and animal fossils. This includes the study of body fossils, tracks (ichnites), burrows, cast-off parts, fossilised feces (coprolites), palynomorphs and chemical residues. Because humans have encountered fossils for millennia, paleontology has a long history both before and after becoming formalized as a science. This article records significant discoveries and events related to paleontology that occurred or were published in the year 1884.

== Arthropods ==
=== insects ===
Name	Novelty	Status	Authors	Age	Type locality	Location	Notes	Images
Anomalites	Gen et Sp nov	valid	Frič	Eocene; Priabonian	Nogent-le-Rotrou	France	A scarab beetle preserved in quartz	Anomalites fugitivus

== Vertebrates ==
=== Expeditions, field work, and fossil discoveries ===
- Joseph Burr Tyrrell discovered a partial Albertosaurus skull near Kneehills Creek in Alberta Canada. This specimen is now catalogued as CMN 5600.

=== Pseudosuchians ===
Newly named pseudosuchians
Name	Novelty	Status	Authors	Age	Type unit	Location	Notes	Images
Macelognathus	Gen et sp nov	Valid	Marsh	Kimmeridgian-Tithonian	Como Bluff Morrison Formation	USA; Wyoming	A sphenosuchian crocodylomorph. Type species M. vagans	Macelognathus vagans

=== Non-avian dinosaurs ===
newly named non-avian dinosaurs
Name	Novelty	Status	Authors	Age	Type unit	Location	Notes	Images
Ceratosaurus	Gen et sp nov	Valid	Marsh	Kimmeridgian-Tithonian	Morrison Formation	USA; Colorado	A ceratosaurid ceratosaur Type species C. nasicornis	Ceratosaurus
Dinodocus	Gen et sp nov	Nomen dubium	Owen	Aptian	Hythe Formation	UK; England	A Sauropod, type species D. mackesoni	

=== Synapsids ===
Newly named non-mammalian synapsids
Name	Novelty	Status	Authors	Age	Type unit	Location	Notes	Images
Tritylodon	Gen et sp nov	Valid	Owen	Hettangian–Sinemurian	Karoo Supergroup	South Africa	A tritylodontid, type species T. longaevus	Tritylodon longaevus

=== Plesiosaurs ===
Newly named plesiosaurs
Name	Status	Authors	Location
Dactylosaurus	Valid	Gurich	Netherlands
