= 1879 in paleontology =

List of years in paleontology	(table)
- … 1869; 1870; 1871; 1872; 1873; 1874; 1875; 1876; 1877; 1878; 1879; 1880; 1881; 1882; 1883; 1884; 1885; 1886; 1887; 1888; 1889 …
- In science 1876 1877 1878 1879 1880 1881 1882
- Art; Archaeology; Architecture; Literature; Music; Philosophy; Science; +...

Paleontology or palaeontology is the study of prehistoric life forms on Earth through the examination of plant and animal fossils. This includes the study of body fossils, tracks (ichnites), burrows, cast-off parts, fossilised feces (coprolites), palynomorphs and chemical residues. Because humans have encountered fossils for millennia, paleontology has a long history both before and after becoming formalized as a science. This article records significant discoveries and events related to paleontology that occurred or were published in the year 1879.

== Plants ==
=== Ferns ===
Name	Novelty	Status	Authors	Age	Type locality	Location	Notes	Images
Equisetum similkamense	Sp nov	valid	Dawson	Ypresian	Allenby Formation	Canada; British Columbia	A scouring rush	Equisetum similkamense

== Arthropods ==
=== Insects ===
Name	Novelty	Status	Authors	Age	Type locality	Location	Notes	Images
Buprestis saxigena	Sp nov	valid	Scudder	Ypresian	Coldwater Beds	Canada; British Columbia	A jewel beetle	Buprestis saxigena (1890 illustration)
Buprestis sepulta	Sp nov	valid	Scudder	Ypresian	Coldwater Beds	Canada; British Columbia	A jewel beetle	Buprestis sepulta (1890 illustration)
Buprestis tertiaria	Sp nov	valid	Scudder	Ypresian	Coldwater Beds	Canada; British Columbia	A jewel beetle	Buprestis tertiaria (1890 illustration)
Cercopis selwyni	Sp nov	valid	Scudder	Ypresian	Allenby Formation	Canada; British Columbia	A froghopper	Cercopis selwyni (1890 illustration)
Cercyon? terrigena	Sp nov	valid	Scudder	Ypresian	Coldwater Beds	Canada; British Columbia	A water scavenger beetle	Cercyon? terrigena (1890 illustration)
Coelidia columbiana	Sp nov	valid	Scudder	Ypresian	Allenby Formation	Canada; British Columbia	A leafhopper	Coelidia columbiana (1890 illustration)
Hygrotrechus stali	Sp nov	jr synonym	Scudder	Ypresian	Allenby Formation	Canada; British Columbia	A gerrine water strider moved to Telmatrechus stali (1890) moved to "Gerris" stali (1910) returned to Telmatrechus stali (1998)	Telmatrechus stali (1890 illustration)
Nebria paleomelas	Sp nov	valid	Scudder	Ypresian	Coldwater Beds	Canada; British Columbia	A ground beetle	Nebria paleomelas (1890 illustration)
Penthetria similkameena	Sp nov	Jr synonym	Scudder	Ypresian	Allenby Formation	Canada; British Columbia	A plecian marchfly moved to Plecia similkameena (1885)	Plecia similkameena
Planophlebia	Gen et sp nov	Jr synonym	Scudder	Ypresian	Allenby Formation	Canada; British Columbia	A hemipteran of uncertain placement	Planophlebia gigantea (1890 illustration)
Tenebrio primigenius	Sp nov	valid	Scudder	Ypresian	Allenby Formation	Canada; British Columbia	A darkling beetle	Tenebrio primigenius (1890 illustration)
Trox oustaleti	Sp nov	valid	Scudder	Ypresian	Allenby Formation	Canada; British Columbia	A hide beetle	Trox oustaleti (1890 illustration)

== Ichthyosauromorpha ==
=== Ichthyosaurs ===
Name	Novelty	Status	Authors	Age	Type locality	Location	Notes	Images
Sauranodon	Gen nov	Junior homonym	Marsh	Late Jurassic (Oxfordian)	Sundance Formation	United States; Wyoming	Preoccupied by Sauranodon Jourdan, 1862; renamed Baptanodon Marsh, 1880.	Baptanodon natans

== Archosauromorphs ==
=== Newly named non-avian dinosaurs ===
Name	Status	Authors	Age	Unit	Location	Notes
Anoplosaurus	Valid	Harry Govier Seeley	middle Cretaceous (late Albian-early Cenomanian)	Cambridge Greensand	United Kingdom	A nodosaurid ankylosaur, a member of Struthiosaurinae. The type species is A. curtonotus.
Brontosaurus	Valid	Othniel Charles Marsh	Late Jurassic (Kimmeridgian-Tithonian)	Morrison Formation	US	An apatosaurine diplodocid.
Camptonotus	Preoccupied.	Othniel Charles Marsh	Late Jurassic (Kimmeridgian-Tithonian)	Morrison Formation	US	Preoccupied by Uhler, 1864. Later renamed Camptosaurus.
Coelurus	Valid	Othniel Charles Marsh	Late Jurassic (Kimmeridgian-Tithonian)	Morrison Formation	US	A basal coelurosaur. The type species is Coelurus fragilis.
Eucercosaurus	Nomen dubium	Harry Govier Seeley	middle Cretaceous (late Albian-early Cenomanian)	Cambridge Greensand	United Kingdom	An dubious ornithopod.
Labrosaurus	Valid	Othniel Charles Marsh	Late Jurassic (Kimmeridgian-Tithonian)	Morrison Formation	US	Junior subjective synonym of Allosaurus. The type species is Allosaurus lucaris Marsh, 1878.
Syngonosaurus	Nomen dubium	Harry Govier Seeley	middle Cretaceous (late Albian-early Cenomanian)	Cambridge Greensand	United Kingdom	A dubious ornithopod. The type species is S. macrocercus.
Vectisaurus	Nomen dubium	Hulke	early Cretaceous (Barremian)	Wessex Formation	United Kingdom	A dubious iguanodont. The type species is Vectisaurus valdensis.

== Synapsids ==
=== "Pelycosaurians" ===
Name	Novelty	Status	Authors	Age	Type locality	Location	Notes	Images
Macromerion	Gen et comb nov	Valid	Fritsch	Late Carboniferous		Czech Republic	A new genus for "Labyrinthodon" schwartzenbergii 1875.	
