= 1881 in paleontology =

List of years in paleontology	(table)
- … 1871; 1872; 1873; 1874; 1875; 1876; 1877; 1878; 1879; 1880; 1881; 1882; 1883; 1884; 1885; 1886; 1887; 1888; 1889; 1890; 1891 …
- In science 1878 1879 1880 1881 1882 1883 1884
- Art; Archaeology; Architecture; Literature; Music; Philosophy; Science; +...

Paleontology or palaeontology is the study of prehistoric life forms on Earth through the examination of plant and animal fossils. This includes the study of body fossils, tracks (ichnites), burrows, cast-off parts, fossilised feces (coprolites), palynomorphs and chemical residues. Because humans have encountered fossils for millennia, paleontology has a long history both before and after becoming formalized as a science. This article records significant discoveries and events related to paleontology that occurred or were published in the year 1881.

== Molluscs ==
=== Bivalves ===
Name	Novelty	Status	Authors	Age	Unit	Location	Notes	Images
Fordilla	gen et sp nov	Valid	Barrande	Early Cambrian		USA	early Cambrian bivalve genus	Fordilla troyensis
Nucula ponderata	sp nov	synonym	Barrande	Ordovician		France; Portugal; UK	moved to the genus Concavodonta as C. ponderata in 1972	

== Dinosaurs ==
=== Newly named dinosaurs ===
Name	Status	Authors	Location	Notes
''Crataeomus''	Nomen dubium	Harry Govier Seeley		Possible subjective synonym of Struthiosaurus.
''Diracodon''	Nomen dubium	Othniel Charles Marsh		Possible subjective synonym of Stegosaurus.
Doratodon	Misidentification	Harry Govier Seeley		Misidentified crocodilian.
Hallopus	Misidentification.	Othniel Charles Marsh		Misidentified crocodilian.
''Hoplosaurus''	Nomen dubium	Harry Govier Seeley		synonym of Pelorosaurus.
Mochlodon	Valid	Harry Govier Seeley	Austria; Hungary; Romania	A Dwarf Iguanodont.
''Oligosaurus''	Nomen dubium	Harry Govier Seeley		Possible subjective synonym of Rhabdodon.
''Ornithomerus''	Jr. synonym	Harry Govier Seeley		Junior subjective synonym of Rhabdodon.
''Pleuropeltus''	Nomen dubium	Harry Govier Seeley		Possible subjective synonym of Struthiosaurus.
Rhadinosaurus	Nomen dubium	Harry Govier Seeley	Austria	

== Pterosaurs ==
=== New taxa ===
Name	Status	Authors	Location	Notes
Dermodactylus	Valid	Marsh		
Laopteryx	Valid	Marsh		
Nyctodactylus	Jr. synonym.	Marsh		Jr. synonym of Nyctosaurus.

== Synapsids ==
=== Non-mammalian ===
Name	Status	Authors	Age	Location	Notes	Images
Aelurosaurus	Valid	Owen	257 Million of years ago	South Africa	A Saber-Toothed Gorgonopsian.	Aelurosaurus

== Paleontologists ==
- Death of the Reverend William Fox a significant early collector of dinosaur fossils from the Isle of Wight.
