= 1874 in paleontology =

List of years in paleontology	(table)
- … 1864; 1865; 1866; 1867; 1868; 1869; 1870; 1871; 1872; 1873; 1874; 1875; 1876; 1877; 1878; 1879; 1880; 1881; 1882; 1883; 1884 …
- In science 1871 1872 1873 1874 1875 1876 1877
- Art; Archaeology; Architecture; Literature; Music; Philosophy; Science; +...

Paleontology or palaeontology is the study of prehistoric life forms on Earth through the examination of plant and animal fossils. This includes the study of body fossils, tracks (ichnites), burrows, cast-off parts, fossilised feces (coprolites), palynomorphs and chemical residues. Because humans have encountered fossils for millennia, paleontology has a long history both before and after becoming formalized as a science. This article records significant discoveries and events related to paleontology that occurred or were published in the year 1874.

== Dinosaurs ==
- Richard Owen publishes a monograph on Wealden and Purbeck reptiles, classifying Scelidosaurus, Iguanodon and Echinodon in the new dinosaur clade Prionodontia.

=== New taxa ===
Taxon	Novelty	Status	Author(s)	Age	Unit	Location	Notes	Images
Agathaumas milo	Sp. nov.	Nomen dubium	Cope	Maastrichtian	Laramie Formation	Colorado	Described as a synonym of Hadrosaurus occidentalis	
Cionodon	Gen. et sp. nov.	Nomen dubium	Cope	Maastrichtian	Laramie Formation	Colorado	A hadrosaurid. Misspelled as Cinodon in original publication due to proofreader	
Craterosaurus	Gen. et sp. nov.	Nomen dubium	Seeley	Aptian	Potton Sands	England	A dubious stegosaur	
Hadrosaurus mirabilis	Comb. nov.	Nomen dubium	Cope	Campanian	Judith River Formation	Montana	A new combination for Trachodon mirabilis	
Hadrosaurus occidentalis	Comb. nov.	Nomen dubium	Cope	Maastrichtian	Lance Formation	Wyoming	A new combination for Thespesius occidentalis	
Ischyrosaurus manseli	Gen. nov.	Preoccupied	Hulke	Kimmeridgian	Kimmeridge Clay Formation	England	Preoccupied by Edward Drinker Cope, 1869. Later named Ornithopsis manseli	
Morinosaurus	Gen. et sp. nov	Nomen dubium	Sauvage	Kimmeridgian	Boulogne-sur-Mer	France	A dubious sauropod	
Polyonax	Gen. et sp. nov.	Nomen dubium	Cope	Maastrichtian	Laramie Formation	Colorado	A ceratopsid	

== Ichthyosaurs ==
=== New taxa ===
Name	Status	Authors	Age	Unit	Location	Notes	Images
Ophthalmosaurus	Valid	Seeley	Middle Jurassic (Callovian)	Oxford Clay Formation	UK	An ophthalmosaurid ichthyosaur.	

== Plesiosaurs ==
=== New taxa ===
Name	Status	Authors	Age	Unit	Location	Notes	Images
Colymbosaurus	Valid	Seeley	Late Jurassic (Kimmeridgian)	Kimmeridge Clay	UK	A cryptoclidid, new genus for "Plesiosaurus" megadeirus Seeley, 1869	
Eretmosaurus	Valid	Seeley	Early Jurassic (Hettangian-Sinemurian)	Blue Lias	UK	A member of Microcleididae; new genus for "Plesiosaurus" rugosus Owen, 1840.	
Mauisaurus	Nomen dubium	Hector	Late Cretaceous (late Campanian-Maastrichtian)	Conway Formation	New Zealand	An elasmosaurid.	
Muraenosaurus	Valid	Seeley	Middle Jurassic (Callovian)	Oxford Clay	UK	A cryptoclidid.	
Rhomaleosaurus	Valid	Seeley	Early Jurassic (Toarcian)	Whitby Mudstone Formation	UK	A rhomaleosaurid; new genus for "Plesiosaurus" cramptoni Carte and Bailey, 1863	

== Pterosaurs ==
=== Newly named pterosaurs ===
Name	Status	Authors	Age	Unit	Location	Notes	Images
Coloborhynchus	Valid	Owen	Early Cretaceous (Valanginian)	Wadhurst Clay Formation	UK	A member of Ornithocheiridae.	
Criorhynchus	Jr. synonym	Owen				Jr. synonym of Ornithocheirus.	

== Squamates ==
=== Newly named mosasaurs ===
Name	Status	Authors	Age	Unit	Location	Notes	Images
Taniwhasaurus	Valid	Hector	Late Campanian	Conway Formation	New Zealand; Japan; Antarctica	A tylosaurine mosasaurid.	Taniwhasaurus oweni
