= 1882 in science =

List of years in science	(table)
- … 1872; 1873; 1874; 1875; 1876; 1877; 1878; 1879; 1880; 1881; 1882; 1883; 1884; 1885; 1886; 1887; 1888; 1889; 1890; 1891; 1892 …
- Art; Archaeology; Architecture; Literature; Music; Philosophy; Science; +...

The year 1882 in science and technology involved some significant events, listed below.

== Astronomy ==
- September – Great Comet of 1882 sighted.
- December 6 – Transit of Venus, 1882.

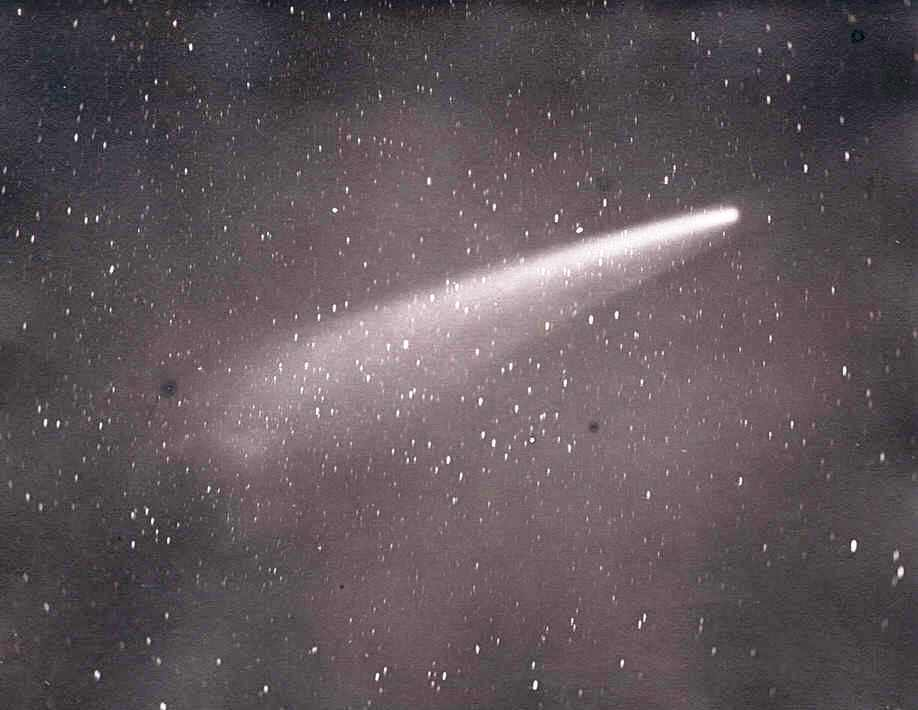
Great Comet as seen from Cape Town by David Gill

== Biology ==
- March 24 – Robert Koch announces his discovery of the bacterium responsible for tuberculosis, Mycobacterium tuberculosis.
- Élie Metchnikoff discovers phagocytosis.

== Chemistry ==
- Italian physicist Luigi Palmieri detects helium on Earth for the first time through its D_{3} spectral line when he analyzes the lava of Mount Vesuvius.

== Earth sciences ==
- Clarence Dutton's Tertiary History of the Grand Cañon District is published by the United States Geological Survey.

== Mathematics ==
- June – German mathematician Ferdinand von Lindemann publishes proof that π is a transcendental number and that squaring the circle is consequently impossible.
- December – Swedish mathematician Gösta Mittag-Leffler establishes the journal Acta Mathematica.
- Felix Klein first describes the Klein bottle.

== Medicine ==
- March 28 – Paul Beiersdorf patents an adhesive bandage in Germany, the foundation of the Beiersdorf company.
- Vladimir Bekhterev publishes Provodiashchie puti mozga ("The Conduction Paths in the Brain and Spinal Cord"), beginning to note the role of the hippocampus in memory.

== Technology ==
- January 12 – Holborn Viaduct power station in the City of London, the world's first coal-fired public electricity generating station, begins operation.
- By March – Étienne-Jules Marey invents a chronophotographic gun capable of photographing 12 consecutive frames per second on the same plate.
- April 29 – Werner von Siemens demonstrates his Electromote, the first form of trolleybus, in Berlin.
- June 6 – Henry W. Seeley patents the electric clothes iron in the United States.
- September 4 – Thomas Edison starts the United States' first commercial electrical power plant, lighting one square mile of lower Manhattan.
- English mechanical engineer James Atkinson invents his "Differential Engine".
- American electrical engineer Schuyler Wheeler produces an electric fan.
- Alfred P. Southwick publishes his proposals for use of the electric chair as an execution method in the United States.
- Nikola Tesla claims this is when he conceives the rotating magnetic field principle, which he later uses to invent his induction motor.

== Events ==
- First International Polar Year, an international scientific program, begins.
- The Chartered Institute of Patent Agents, the modern-day Chartered Institute of Patent Attorneys, is founded in the United Kingdom.

== Awards ==
- Copley Medal: Arthur Cayley
- Wollaston Medal for Geology: Franz Ritter von Hauer

== Births ==
- March 14 – Wacław Sierpiński (died 1969), Polish mathematician.
- March 23 – Emmy Noether (died 1935), German mathematician.
- March 30 – Melanie Klein (died 1960), Viennese-born psychoanalyst.
- April 27 – Harry Allan (died 1957), New Zealand botanist.
- June 17 – Harold Gillies (died 1960), New Zealand-born plastic surgeon.
- July 12 – Traian Lalescu (died 1929), Romanian mathematician.
- July 21 – Herbert E. Ives (died 1953), American optical engineer.
- September 30 – Hans Geiger (died 1945), German inventor of the Geiger counter.
- October 5 – Robert Goddard (died 1945), American rocket scientist.
- October 26 – Marietta Pallis (died 1963), Indian-born Graeco-British ecologist.
- November 18 – Frances Gertrude McGill (died 1959), pioneering Canadian forensic pathologist.
- December 11 – Max Born (died 1970), German physicist and recipient of the Nobel Prize in Physics in 1954.
- December 28 – Arthur Eddington (died 1944), English astrophysicist.
- Israel Aharoni (died 1946), Belarusian-born Jewish zoologist.

== Deaths ==
- January 11 – Theodor Schwann (born 1810), German physiologist.
- April 19 – Charles Darwin (born 1809), English naturalist and geologist.
- August 24 – John Dillwyn Llewelyn (born 1810), Welsh botanist and photographer.
- September 23 – Friedrich Wöhler (born 1800), German chemist.
- October 27 – Christian Heinrich von Nagel (born 1803), German geometer.
- November 20 – Henry Draper (born 1837), doctor, American astronomer.
- December 24
  - Johann Benedict Listing (born 1808), German mathematician.
  - Charles Vincent Walker (born 1812), English telegraph engineer.
