= 1890 in science =

List of years in science	(table)
- … 1880; 1881; 1882; 1883; 1884; 1885; 1886; 1887; 1888; 1889; 1890; 1891; 1892; 1893; 1894; 1895; 1896; 1897; 1898; 1899; 1900 …
- Art; Archaeology; Architecture; Literature; Music; Philosophy; Science; +...

The year 1890 in science and technology involved some significant events, listed below.

== Biology ==
- September 25 – Sequoia National Park created in the United States.
- October 1 – Yosemite National Park created in the United States.
- Walter Heape successfully breeds rabbits from fertilised ova transferred from the biological mother to the uterus of an animal of a different breed.
- Francis Galton announces a statistical demonstration of the uniqueness and classifiability of individual human fingerprints.
- Jacques Loeb publishes his first major work on tropism, Der Heliotropismus der Thiere und seine Uebereinstimmung mit dem Heliotropismus der Pflanzen.
- Henry Luke Bolley at the new North Dakota Agricultural College isolates the organism responsible for potato scab and develops an effective treatment.

== Chemistry ==
- Nikolai Menshutkin discovers that a tertiary amine can be converted into a quaternary ammonium salt by reaction with an alkyl halide – the Menshutkin reaction.
- Emil Fischer establishes the stereochemistry and isomeric nature of the sugars by epimerization between gluconic and mannonic acids and synthesizes glucose, fructose and mannose from glycerol.

== Computer science ==
- June 1 – The United States Census Bureau begins using Herman Hollerith's tabulating machine to record census returns using punched card input, a landmark in the history of computing hardware. Hollerith's company eventually becomes IBM.

== Earth sciences ==
- The United States city of Boise, Idaho, drills the first geothermal well.
- The phosphate mineral messelite (from Messel in Germany) is first described.

== Mathematics ==
- Philippa Fawcett is placed above the Senior Wrangler in the Mathematical Tripos at the University of Cambridge in England.
- P. J. Heawood proves the five colour theorem.
- Giuseppe Peano is the first to demonstrate a space-filling curve.

== Medicine ==
- Discovery by Emil von Behring and Kitasato Shibasaburō that an anti-toxin for immunizing people against diphtheria can be prepared by injecting diphtheria toxin into animals.
- Curt Schimmelbusch invents the Schimmelbusch mask for the safe delivery of anesthetics to surgical patients.
- Santiago Ramón y Cajal publishes the first edition of Manual de Anatomia Pathologica General.
- Robert Koch publishes his postulates on the causal relationship between microbes and diseases.
- William James publishes The Principles of Psychology.

== Technology ==
- May – Herbert Akroyd Stuart, in collaboration with Charles Richard Binney and Richard Hornsby & Sons, files a British patent for Improvements in Engines Operated by the Explosion of Mixtures of Combustible Vapour or Gas and Air, the first successful design of hot bulb engine, which will be produced as the heavy-oil Hornsby-Akroyd oil engine.
- August 6 – At Auburn Prison in New York, William Kemmler becomes the first person to be executed in the AC electric chair.
- October 9 – The first brief flight of Clément Ader's steam-powered fixed-wing aircraft Eole takes place in Satory, France. It flies uncontrolled approximately 50 m (160 ft) at a height of 20 cm, the first take-off of a powered airplane solely under its own power.
- Approximate date – British civil engineer Ernest William Moir invents the airlock while working in New York.
- Scottish American chemist William Morrison produces the first successful practical electric road vehicle in the United States.
- The precut paperboard box is invented by Robert Gair, a Brooklyn printer and packaging producer.
- The Hurter and Driffield film speed measurement system is described.

== Awards ==
- Copley Medal: Simon Newcomb
- Wollaston Medal for Geology: William Crawford Williamson

== Births ==
- January 14 – Arthur Holmes (died 1965), English geologist.
- January 19 – Ștefan Procopiu (died 1972), Romanian physicist.
- January 26 – Grantly Dick-Read (died 1959), English obstetrician.
- February 17 – Ronald Fisher (died 1962), English statistician and geneticist.
- March 11 – Vannevar Bush (died 1974), American science administrator.
- March 20 – Elizabeth Rona (died 1981), Hungarian-born nuclear chemist.
- March 26 – Abner Doble (died 1961), American steam engineer.
- May 4 – Carl Brigham (died 1943), American pioneer of psychometrics.
- June 1 – Edward Hutchinson Synge (died 1957), Irish theoretical physicist.
- December 20 – Jaroslav Heyrovský (died 1967), Czech chemist.
- December 21 – Hermann Joseph Muller (died 1967), American geneticist.

== Deaths ==
- January 27 – Karl Friedrich Otto Westphal (born 1833), German psychiatrist.
- February 3 – C. H. D. Buys Ballot (born 1817), Dutch meteorologist.
- April 1 – Alexander Mozhaysky (born 1825), Russian aeronautical pioneer.
- August 30 – Marianne North (born 1830), English botanist.
- December 26 – Heinrich Schliemann (born 1822), German archaeologist.
