= 1877 in science =

List of years in science	(table)
- … 1867; 1868; 1869; 1870; 1871; 1872; 1873; 1874; 1875; 1876; 1877; 1878; 1879; 1880; 1881; 1882; 1883; 1884; 1885; 1886; 1887 …
- Art; Archaeology; Architecture; Literature; Music; Philosophy; Science; +...

The year 1877 in science and technology involved some significant events, listed below.

== Events ==
- June 19 – Eadweard Muybridge successfully produces a fast-motion sequence of photographs showing a horse in movement, Sallie Gardner at a Gallop, using multiple cameras at Palo Alto, California, demonstrating that a running horse has all four legs lifted off the ground at once. The sequence could be run on a Zoopraxiscope.

== Astronomy ==
- August 12 – American astronomer Asaph Hall discovers Deimos, the smaller of the two moons of Mars. On August 18, he discovers the larger, Phobos.

== Cartography ==
- Peirce quincuncial projection devised by Charles Sanders Peirce.

== Chemistry ==
- Ludwig Boltzmann establishes statistical derivations of many important physical and chemical concepts, including entropy, and distributions of molecular velocities in the gas phase.

== Earth sciences ==
- June 26 – Volcanic eruption of Cotopaxi in Ecuador.

== History of science ==
- Dr. August Eisenlohr publishes the first translation and study of the Rhind Mathematical Papyrus.
- American railroad lawyer and ethnologist Lewis H. Morgan publishes Ancient Society, linking social progress with technological change.

== Mathematics ==
- Georg Cantor advances the continuum hypothesis.

== Medicine ==
- October 2 – Berlin urologist Maximilian Nitze and Viennese instrument-maker Josef Leiter introduce the first practical cystourethroscope with an electric light source.
- Adolph Kussmaul first describes dyslexia as "word-blindness".
- William Macewen at the Glasgow Royal Infirmary develops the first bone grafts, and also performs knee surgery using a special instrument (Macewen's osteotome), for the treatment of rickets.
- Patrick Manson studies animal carriers of infectious diseases.

== Physics ==
- Ludwig Boltzmann states the relationship between entropy and probability.

== Technology ==
- March 28 – Frederick Wolseley is granted his first patent for a sheep shearing machine.
- April 30 – French poet Charles Cros describes a method of recording sound, the Paleophone.
- June – Emile Berliner files a patent for a "combined telegraph and telephone" incorporating a microphone.
- June 20 – Alexander Graham Bell installs the world's first commercial telephone service in Hamilton, Ontario.
- September 4 – Louis Brennan patents the Brennan torpedo.
- October – Emile Berliner files a patent for a telephone with induction coils.
- November 4 – Opening of Gustave Eiffel's Maria Pia Bridge carrying the railway across the Douro into Porto, Portugal.
- November 29 – Thomas Edison first demonstrates his phonograph sound recording machine.
- December 13 – Thomas Edison files a patent for "telephones or speaking-telegraphs" incorporating a microphone.
- Surveyor and inventor George R. Carey of Boston, Massachusetts, creates a selenium telectroscope — a camera that can project a moving image to a distant point, an ancestor of television. Constantin Senlecq of Ardres, France, develops the same idea independently at about the same time.

== Publications ==
- Zeitschrift für Physiologische Chemie is founded by Felix Hoppe-Seyler.

== Awards ==
- Copley Medal: James Dwight Dana
- Wollaston Medal: Robert Mallet

== Births ==
- February 2 – Margarete Zuelzer (died 1944), German microbiologist.
- February 7 – G. H. Hardy (died 1947), English mathematician.
- March 16 – Thomas Wyatt Turner (died 1978), American civil rights activist, biologist and educator; first black person ever to receive a doctorate from Cornell University.
- April 5 – Walter Sutton (died 1916), American geneticist and surgeon.
- April 24 – José Ingenieros (died 1925), Argentine polymath.
- June 14 – Ida Maclean, born Ida Smedley (died 1944), English biochemist.
- September 1 – Francis William Aston (died 1945), English chemist, Nobel Prize laureate.
- September 2 – Frederick Soddy (died 1956), English physical chemist.
- September 11 – James Hopwood Jeans (died 1946), English mathematician.
- September 13 – Wilhelm Filchner (died 1957), German explorer.
- October 21 – Oswald Avery (died 1955), Canadian American bacteriologist.
- October 25 – Henry Norris Russell (died 1957), American astronomer.
- November 3 – Rosalie Edge (died 1962), American conservationist.

== Deaths ==
- January 2 – Alexander Bain (born 1810), Scottish inventor.
- January 12 – Wilhelm Friedrich Benedikt Hofmeister (born 1824), German botanist.
- February 8 – Charles Wilkes (born 1798), American navigator.
- April 9 – Pierre Louis Alphée Cazenave (born 1795), French dermatologist.
- May 5 – Joseph Bienaimé Caventou (born 1795), French pharmacist.
- June 3 – Ludwig von Köchel (born 1800), Austrian musicologist and botanist.
- September 17 – H. Fox Talbot (born 1800), English pioneer of photography.
- September 23 – Urbain Le Verrier (born 1811), French astronomer.
- September 26 – Hermann Günther Grassmann (born 1809), German mathematician.
- Choe Han-gi (born 1803), Korean philosopher of science.
