= 1875 in paleontology =

| List of years in paleontology | (table) |
- … 1865; 1866; 1867; 1868; 1869; 1870; 1871; 1872; 1873; 1874; 1875; 1876; 1877; 1878; 1879; 1880; 1881; 1882; 1883; 1884; 1885 …
- In science 1872 1873 1874 1875 1876 1877 1878
- Art; Archaeology; Architecture; Literature; Music; Philosophy; Science; +...

Paleontology or palaeontology is the study of prehistoric life forms on Earth through the examination of plant and animal fossils. This includes the study of body fossils, tracks (ichnites), burrows, cast-off parts, fossilised feces (coprolites), palynomorphs and chemical residues. Because humans have encountered fossils for millennia, paleontology has a long history both before and after becoming formalized as a science. This article records significant discoveries and events related to paleontology that occurred or were published in the year 1875.

== Dinosaurs ==
| Taxon | Novelty | Status | Author(s) | Age | Unit | Location | Notes | Images |
|---|---|---|---|---|---|---|---|---|
| Arctosaurus | Gen. et sp. nov. | Nomen dubium | Adams | Carnian | Heiberg Formation | Nunavut | Dubious archosauriform | |
| Cionodon stenopsis | Sp. nov. | Nomen dubium | Cope | Campanian | Belly River Group | Alberta | A species of Cionodon | |
| Bothriospondylus | Gen. et sp. nov. | Nomen dubium | Owen | Kimmeridgian | Kimmeridge Clay Formation | England | A sauropod | |
| Marmarospondylus | Gen. nov. | Nomen dubium | Sir Richard Owen | Bathonian | Forest Marble Formation | A new genus for Bothriospondylus robustus named earlier in the same year | | |
| Omosaurus armatus | Gen. et sp. nov. | Preoccupied | Owen | Kimmeridgian | Kimmeridge Clay Formation | England | Preoccupied by Omosaurus Joseph Leidy, 1856. Later renamed Dacentrurus | |
| Priodontognathus | Gen. nov. | Nomen dubium | Seeley | Oxfordian | Yorkshire | England | A new genus for Iguanodon phillipsii | |

== Pterosaurs ==
=== New taxa ===
| Name | Status | Authors | Notes |
|---|---|---|---|
| Doratorhynchus | Valid | Seeley | |

== Synapsids ==
=== Ophiacodontidae ===
| Name | Novelty | Status | Authors | Age | Type locality | Location | Notes | Images |
|---|---|---|---|---|---|---|---|---|
| Clepsydrops | Gen nov | Valid | Cope | early Late Carboniferous | | USA; Illinois | An ophiacodontid synapsid | |

== Paleontologists ==
- Birth of Friedrich von Huene, the well known German paleontologist.
