= 1958 in science =

The year 1958 in science and technology involved some significant events, listed below.

== Events ==
- During International Geophysical Year
  - Earth's magnetosphere is discovered.
  - The 3rd Soviet Antarctic Expedition discovers the subglacial Gamburtsev Mountain Range in Antarctica; also becoming the first to reach the Southern Pole of Inaccessibility (December 14).
  - The Commonwealth Trans-Antarctic Expedition completes (March 2) its three-year mission to make the first overland crossing of Antarctica, via the South Pole. The first (and third ever) team to reach the Pole overland (January 3) is Edmund Hillary's, using adapted Ferguson TE20 tractors, the first powered vehicles to complete a trip here.
- April 17–October 19 – Expo 58 in Brussels. The centrepiece is the Atomium; and a model of tobacco mosaic virus structure by Rosalind Franklin's research team is exhibited.
- July 9 – 1958 Lituya Bay megatsunami: A 7.8 M_{w} strike-slip earthquake in Southeast Alaska causes a landslide that produces a megatsunami. The runup from the waves reaches 525 m (1,722 ft) on the rim of Lituya Bay.

== Astronomy and space exploration ==
- January 4 – Sputnik 1 falls to Earth from its orbit and burns up (launched on October 4, 1957).
- January 31 – The first successful American satellite, Explorer I, is launched into orbit.
- February 5 – A backup for Vanguard TV3 fails to reach orbit.
- February 11 – The strongest known solar maximum is recorded.
- March 5 – Explorer 2 fails to reach orbit.
- March 17 – Vanguard 1 becomes the first of its program to enter space, after three failed attempts.
- March 26 – Explorer 3 is launched into orbit.
- April 14 – Sputnik 2 re-enters Earth's atmosphere.
- July 29 – The United States Congress formally creates the National Aeronautics and Space Administration (NASA).
- September 14 – Two rockets designed by Ernst Mohr (the first post-war German rockets) reach the upper atmosphere.
- December 18 – The United States launches SCORE, the world's first communications satellite.

== Biology ==
- Francis Crick states the "central dogma of molecular biology".
- John Gurdon clones a frog using somatic-cell nuclear transfer from a Xenopus tadpole.
- Anne McLaren, with John D. Biggers, reports the first mammals, a litter of mice, grown from embryos developed in vitro and transferred to a surrogate mother.
- Danish virologist Preben von Magnus gives the first confirmation of monkeypox virus and description of monkeypox (in laboratory crab-eating macaques).

== Chemistry ==
- Denatonium, the bitterest chemical compound known (used as an aversive agent), is discovered during research on local anesthetics by Macfarlan Smith of Edinburgh, Scotland, and registered under the trademark Bitrex.
- Instant noodles introduced by Momofuku Ando.

== Computer science ==
- May 27–June 2 – A joint meeting of the ACM and GAMM at ETH Zurich agrees to produce the International Algebraic Language, which will become the programming language ALGOL.
- Friedrich L. Bauer and other members of the ZMMD-Group build a working ALGOL 58 compiler.
- John McCarthy specifies the Lisp programming language.

== History of science ==
- Society for the History of Technology established.

== Mathematics ==
- School Mathematics Study Group, directed by Edward G. Begle, established to develop a new school mathematics curriculum for the United States; it is influential in the promotion of New Math.

== Medicine ==
- May 22 – Jérôme Lejeune, working with Marthe Gautier in Raymond Turpin's French laboratory, discovers that the genetic cause of Down syndrome is an extra copy of chromosome 21, the first time that a defect in intellectual development is shown to be linked to chromosomal abnormalities.
- June 7 – Ian Donald publishes an article in The Lancet which describes the diagnostic use of ultrasound in obstetrics.
- October 31 – The first clinical implantation into a human of a fully implantable artificial pacemaker takes place at the Karolinska Institute in Solna, Sweden, using a pacemaker designed by Rune Elmqvist and surgeon Åke Senning. The patient, Arne Larsson (1915–2001), survives until age 86, having been fitted with 22 pacemakers throughout his life.
- Engineer Earl Bakken (U.S.) produces the first wearable external artificial pacemaker, for a patient of Dr. C. Walton Lillehei.
- B. Eiseman and colleagues from Colorado first describe fecal microbiota transplantation.
- Denis Parsons Burkitt first describes Burkitt's lymphoma.

== Paleontology ==
- February 7 – Discovery of "Deep Skull" in Niah Caves in Sarawak by Barbara and Tom Harrisson, at around 40,000 years BP the oldest known evidence of Homo sapiens in southeast Asia.

== Psychology ==
- Fritz Heider proposes the naïve scientist model of social cognition.

== Technology ==
- January 28 – The classic Lego brick is patented in Denmark.
- April 1 – The BBC Radiophonic Workshop is established in London.
- September 12 – Jack Kilby demonstrates the first integrated circuit.
- December 8 – First production Leyland Atlantean rear-engined double-decker bus enters service in England.
- December 15 – Arthur L. Schawlow and Charles H. Townes of Bell Laboratories publish a paper in Physical Review Letters setting out the principles of the optical laser.
- December 18 – The Bell XV-3 Tiltrotor makes the first true mid-air transition from vertical helicopter-type flight to fully level fixed-wing flight.
- Dutch rally driver Maus Gatsonides introduces his first roadside automobile speed measurement device.

== Awards ==
- Fields Prize in Mathematics: Klaus Roth and René Thom
- Nobel Prizes
  - Physics – Pavel Alekseyevich Cherenkov, Ilya Mikhailovich Frank, Igor Yevgenyevich Tamm
  - Chemistry – Frederick Sanger
  - Medicine – George Wells Beadle, Edward Lawrie Tatum, Joshua Lederberg

== Births ==
- January 15 – Debi Prasad Sarkar, Indian biochemist
- February 26 – Susan J. Helms, American astronaut
- March 7 – Alan Hale (died 2026), Japan-born American astronomer
- June 4 – Thomas Callister Hales, American mathematician
- July 14 – Anthony Atala, Peruvian-born American regenerative medicine practitioner
- July 15 – Monica Grady, British meteorite scientist
- August 16 – Anne L'Huillier, French-born atomic physicist (Nobel Prize in Physics 2023)
- October 5 – Neil deGrasse Tyson, American astrophysicist
- John M. Martinis, American physicist (Nobel Prize in Physics 2025)

== Deaths ==
- February 1 – Clinton Davisson (born 1888), American physicist (Nobel Prize in Physics 1937)
- February 11 – Ernest Jones (born 1879), Welsh psychoanalyst
- April 16 – Rosalind Franklin (born 1920), English crystallographer
- August 14 – Frédéric Joliot-Curie (born 1900), French physicist (Nobel Prize in Chemistry 1935)
- August 16 – Chevalier Jackson (born 1865), American laryngologist and pioneer of endoscopy
- August 27 – Ernest Lawrence (born 1901), American nuclear physicist (Nobel Prize in Physics 1939)
- October 2 – Marie Stopes (born 1880), Scottish paleobotanist and pioneer of birth control
- November 17 – Yutaka Taniyama (born 1927), Japanese mathematician (suicide)
- December 12 – Milutin Milanković (born 1879), Serbian geophysicist
- December 15 – Wolfgang Pauli (born 1900), Austrian theoretical physicist
