= Leyden, Colorado =

Coordinates: 39°50′41″N 105°11′03″W

Location of Leyden within the state of Colorado.

Leyden, Colorado, elevation 5,656 feet (1,724 m) is a small unincorporated community in Jefferson County, Colorado west of Arvada at the junction of West 82nd Avenue and Quaker Street. It is a historic company town established by the Leyden Coal Company in 1902 to house the miners of the Leyden Coal Mine nearby to the west.

== History ==
The town of Leyden consists of a collection of square frame homes with pyramidal roofs that were originally red trimmed in white. It was named for pioneer miner brothers Michael, Martin and John Leyden, who discovered the original Leyden mine in the hogback ridge to the west, where Michael and Martin died in 1866 and 1870, respectively. At its height, the town of Leyden included these homes as well as the company store, school, boarding house, saloon, and Presbyterian chapel. The store still stands at the southeast corner of 82nd and Quaker, while the school is the easternmost house on the hillside to the north, and the foreman's house stands next door to its west. The town housed a diverse population of native and immigrant miners, including from such countries as Austria, Hungary, Greece, Germany, Brazil, Italy, Mexico, and more. Major events in its history include the Leyden Mine Disaster in 1910 which claimed 10 lives, and the workers' strike of 1914

Leyden ceased to be a company town around 1951 when the mine ceased operation. The town site was sold to investors and then the company town houses were sold to individual homeowners. Leyden has remained an unincorporated community with its own water district ever since.

== Leyden Coal Mine ==
The Leyden Coal Mine was operated by the Leyden Coal Company. Between 1903 and 1950 it produced about 6 Mt of sub-bituminous coal. The mine consisted of four shafts providing the access to two flat-lying coal seams from 240 to 260 m (790 to 855 ft) below the surface in the Late Cretaceous Laramie Formation. It was a room and pillar operation with an estimated recovery of about 35%. The coal was used in the Denver area and beyond, as well as by the Denver Tramway that was a subsidiary of railroad magnate David Moffat.

In 1961, the Public Service Company of Colorado, a subsidiary of Xcel Energy, established the Leyden Gas Storage Operation which used the abandoned mine to store natural gas but gas storage ceased after 2000 due to concerns about leakage. In 2004 the City of Arvada began injecting water and using the abandoned mine as a subsurface water reservoir.
