= 1953 in science =

The year 1953 involved numerous significant events in science and technology, including the first description of the DNA double helix, the discovery of neutrinos, and the release of the first polio vaccine.

== Biology ==
- February 15 – Linus Pauling proposes a DNA triple helix structure, which is rapidly shown to be incorrect.

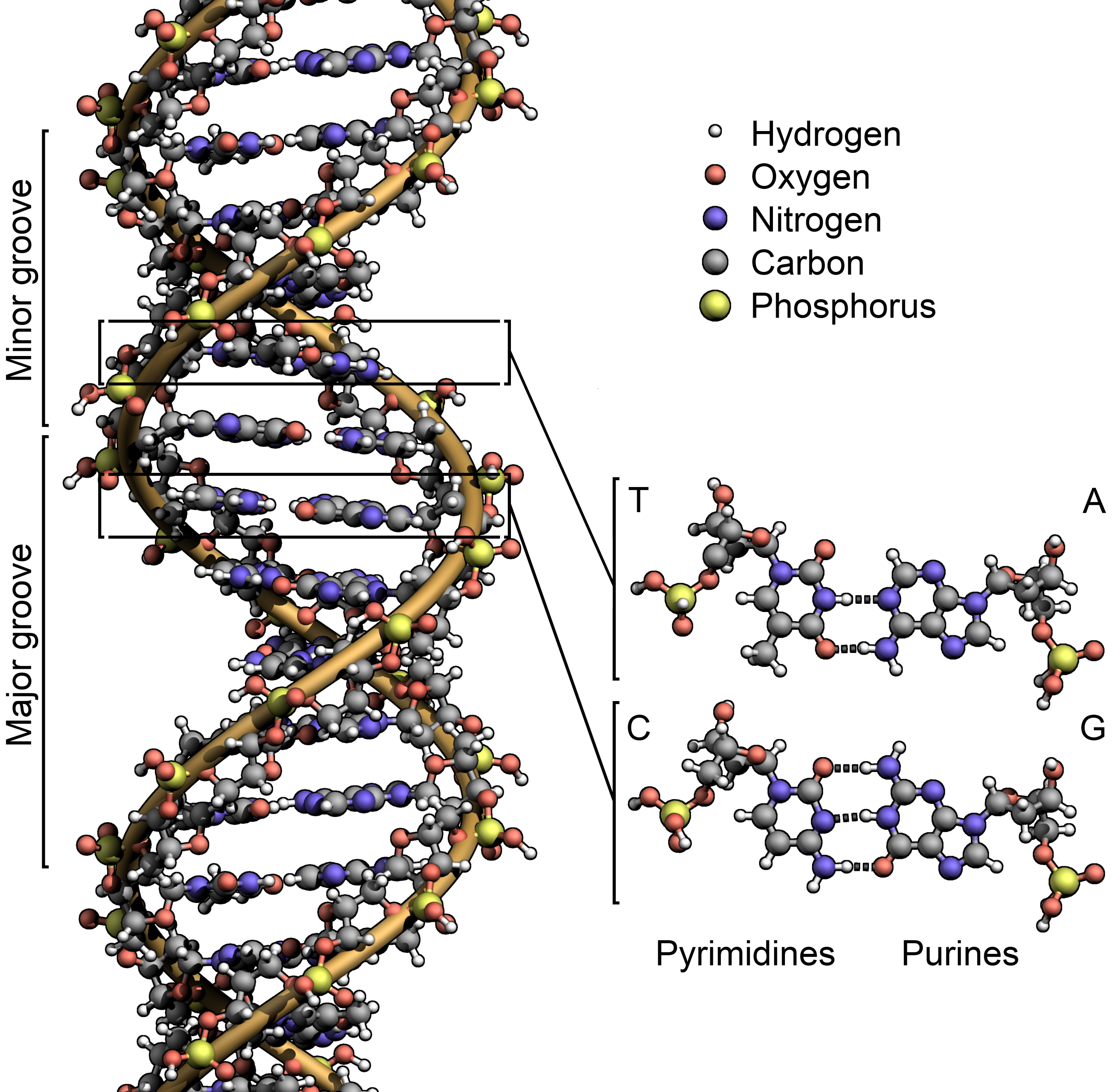
25 April 1953: the DNA double helix is first formally described.

- February 28 – Francis Crick and James Watson enter The Eagle, Cambridge, for a pub lunch announcing "We have discovered the secret of life."
- April 25 – Francis Crick and James D. Watson of the U.K. Medical Research Council's Unit for Research on the Molecular Structure of Biological Systems at the Cavendish Laboratory in the University of Cambridge publish "Molecular Structure of Nucleic Acids: A Structure for Deoxyribose Nucleic Acid" in the British journal Nature. Their work is often ranked as one of the most dramatic biological discoveries of the 20th century, because of the structural beauty and functional logic of the DNA double helix. In 1962, they will share the Nobel Prize in Medicine with Maurice Wilkins, who publishes X-ray crystallography results for DNA in the same issue of Nature in 1953. The third related article published at the same time is by Rosalind Franklin and Raymond Gosling, on "Molecular Configuration in Sodium Thymonucleate".

== Chemistry ==
- May 15 – Stanley Miller publishes results from the Miller–Urey experiment in the journal Science. These surprise many chemists, by showing that organic molecules present in living organisms can form easily from simple inorganic chemicals.
- Rudolph Pariser, Robert G. Parr and John Pople publish their computational quantum chemistry theory for approximating molecular orbitals.
- Ziegler–Natta catalyst invented by Karl Ziegler and Giulio Natta.

== Computer sciences ==
- October – UNIVAC 1103 launched.
- Tom Kilburn at the University of Manchester completes a device called MEG, which performs floating-point calculations. This machine evolves into the first transistorized computer, the Metro-Vickers MV950, ultimately leading to the mass production of computers.
- Alan Turing publishes an article describing the first 1,104 zeroes of the Riemann zeta-function, the culmination of fifteen years of work on how to use computers to tackle a fundamental problem in number theory.

== Earth sciences ==
- Maurice Ewing and Bruce Heezen discover the deep canyon running along the center of the Mid-Atlantic Ridge, an important contribution to the theory of plate tectonics.

== Mathematics ==
- Klaus Roth publishes a theorem regarded as a milestone in arithmetic combinatorics.

== Medicine and human sciences ==
- January 31 – Physicians at the University of Rochester, New York, use frontal lobe novocaine injections to relieve cancer pain, inspired by Dr. van Wagenen’s psychiatric trials predicting lobotomy success; 60% respond well and undergo surgery.
- February 13 – Christine Jorgensen, the first widely known American transsexual, returns to New York after successful sexual reassignment surgery in Denmark.
- March 26 – Jonas Salk announces his polio vaccine.
- May 6 – The first successful open heart surgery on a human utilizing a cardiopulmonary bypass pump ("heart-lung machine") is performed by John Gibbon at Thomas Jefferson University Hospital in Philadelphia when he repairs an atrial septal defect in 18-year-old Cecilia Bavolek.
- July 11 – Andrew Watt Kay publishes his augmented histamine test.
- August 18 – The second of the controversial Kinsey Reports on human sexuality, Sexual Behavior in the Human Female, is published in the United States.
- September 1 – American neurosurgeon William Beecher Scoville performs an experimental segmental resection on Henry Molaison ("H.M.") at Hartford Hospital (Connecticut) in an attempt to control his severe epilepsy, involving removal of most of H.M.'s medial temporal lobes on both hemispheres including the hippocampi, amygdalae and entorhinal cortex (the major sensory input to the hippocampi), and rendering him a continuing subject for the study of memory formation and cognitive neuropsychology.
- September 4 – The discovery of REM sleep is first published by researchers Eugene Aserinsky and Nathaniel Kleitman of the University of Chicago.
- American scientist Winston Price isolates the first rhinovirus, the most prevalent cause of the common cold.
- Cincinnati psychiatrist Max Lurie and Harry Salzer coin the term antidepressant.
- B. F. Skinner publishes the book Science and Human Behavior, a controversial attempt to apply the results of behavioral studies of laboratory animals to human psychology.

== Paleontology ==
- 20 November – Authorities at the Natural History Museum in London announce that the skull of Piltdown Man (allegedly an early human discovered in 1912) is a hoax.

== Photography ==
- 31 January – Kodak introduces enhanced Linagraph paper, circular neutral density wedges, ultra-pure hemin for research, and high-speed cameras capturing up to 3200 fps—advancing tools for laboratories and engineering analysis.

== Physics ==
- Frederick Reines and Clyde Cowan perform the first neutrino detection experiments, constructing the first neutrino detector (a cadmium-water target) and using the Hanford Site nuclear facility in Washington state as the neutrino source. This work, first discussed with Enrico Fermi and others in 1951–2, leads to the 1995 Nobel Prize in Physics.
- Enrico Fermi, John Pasta, Stanislaw Ulam, and Mary Tsingou conduct computer simulations of a vibrating string that included a non-linear term in what became known as the Fermi–Pasta–Ulam–Tsingou experiment.
- Charles Kittel publishes his influential textbook Introduction to Solid State Physics in the United States.

== Technology ==
- September 16 – Epic film The Robe is released in the United States as the first widescreen anamorphic format movie, filmed in CinemaScope.
- December 17 – The NTSC color television standard is agreed for the United States.
- J. C. Bamford of England introduce the backhoe loader.
- The Jet Propulsion Laboratory completes development of the SSM-A-17 Corporal I rocket. This is the first American surface-to-surface ballistic missile, powered by a liquid-fuelled motor utilizing nitric acid as the oxidizer.

== Events ==
- January 13 – "Doctors' plot": The state newspaper Pravda publishes an article alleging that many of the Soviet Union's top doctors are part of a major plot to poison the country's senior political and military leaders.
- February 16 – The Pakistan Academy of Sciences is established.
- October 9 – As part of an extended series of publications on science, Pope Pius XII publishes "The Technician", which instructs scientists to restrict themselves to the study of physical matter and do nothing to undermine the idea of a non-material soul or a Superior Being. "The Technician" is delivered as a papal address on October 9.
- Rudolf Carnap publishes an article called "Testability and Meaning" in Readings in the Philosophy of Science, which moves away from the philosophical position of logical positivism with respect to science (particularly the heavily mathematical sciences, such as physics). Carnap instead emphasizes the idea that progress in science depends on the gradual accumulation of many small results that support human understanding of the world, a view more in line with Ludwig Wittgenstein's later philosophy and the biological sciences.

== Prizes ==
=== Nobel Prize ===
- 1953 Nobel Prize in Physiology or Medicine: Hans Adolf Krebs and Fritz Albert Lipmann
- 1953 Nobel Prize in Physics: Frits Zernike
- 1953 Nobel Prize in Chemistry: Hermann Staudinger

== Births ==
- January 2 – Vincent Racaniello, American virologist.
- January 17 – Ingeborg Hochmair (née Desoyer), Austrian electrical engineer.
- January 21 – Paul Allen, American entrepreneur, co-founder of Microsoft (d. 2018).
- January 25 – Mark Walport, English medical scientist and Government Chief Scientific Adviser (United Kingdom).
- March 5 – Michel Devoret, French-born physicist, recipient of the Nobel Prize in Physics.
- May 14 – Martin Page, English botanist.
- May 15 – Athene Donald (née Griffith), English experimental physicist.
- May 17 – Maria Petrou, Anglo-Greek artificial intelligence researcher (d. 2012).
- May 18 – David Deutsch, Israeli-born quantum physicist.
- August 16 – David Spiegelhalter, English statistician.
- August 24 – Georg Nagel, German biophysicist, recipient of the Nobel Prize in Physiology or Medicine.
- December 1 – Victor Ambros, American developmental biologist, recipient of the Nobel Prize in Physiology or Medicine.
- Debra Fischer, American astronomer.
- Pat Nuttall, British virologist and acarologist.

== Deaths ==
- January 16 – Solomon Carter Fuller, African American psychiatrist (b. 1872).
- February 25 – Sergei Winogradsky, Russian microbiologist (b. 1856).
- April 17 – Sven Gustaf Wingqvist, Swedish engineer, inventor and industrialist (b. 1876).
- April 22 – Jan Czochralski, Polish–German discoverer of the Czochralski process for growing crystals (b. 1885).
- August 15 – Ludwig Prandtl, German physicist (b. 1875).
- September 28 – Edwin Hubble, American astronomer (b. 1889).
- September 30 – Lewis Fry Richardson, English mathematical physicist (b. 1881).
- October 30 – Alice Eastwood, Canadian American botanist (b. 1859).
- November 13 – Herbert E. Ives, American optical engineer (b. 1882).

== See also ==
- List of years in science
- 1953 in spaceflight
