= Karl Prachar =

Austrian mathematician (1924–1994)

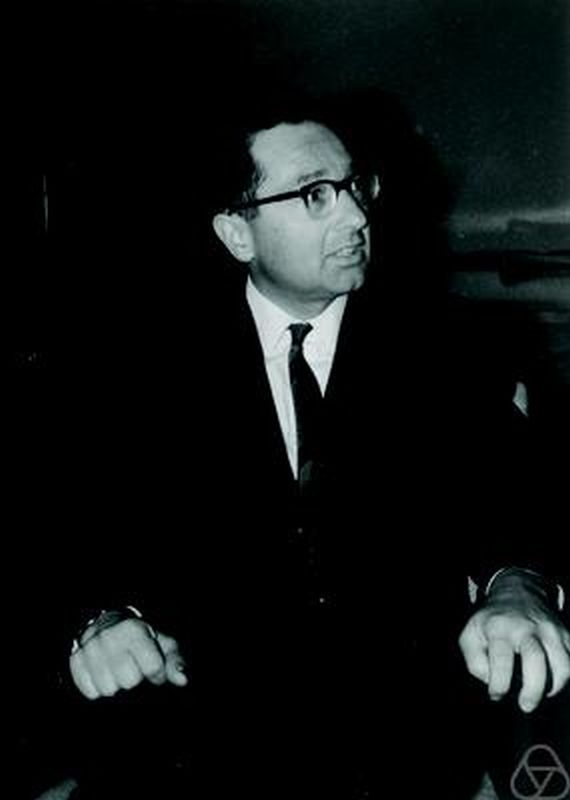
Karl Prachar, Wien 1967

Karl Prachar (German: [ˈpʁaçaːɐ̯]; 1924 – November 27, 1994) was an Austrian mathematician who worked in the area of analytic number theory. He is known for his much acclaimed book on the distribution of the prime numbers, Primzahlverteilung (Springer Verlag, 1957).

Prachar received his doctorate in 1947 from the University of Vienna.
