= 1969 in science =

The year 1969 in science and technology involved some significant events, listed below.

== Astronomy and space exploration ==
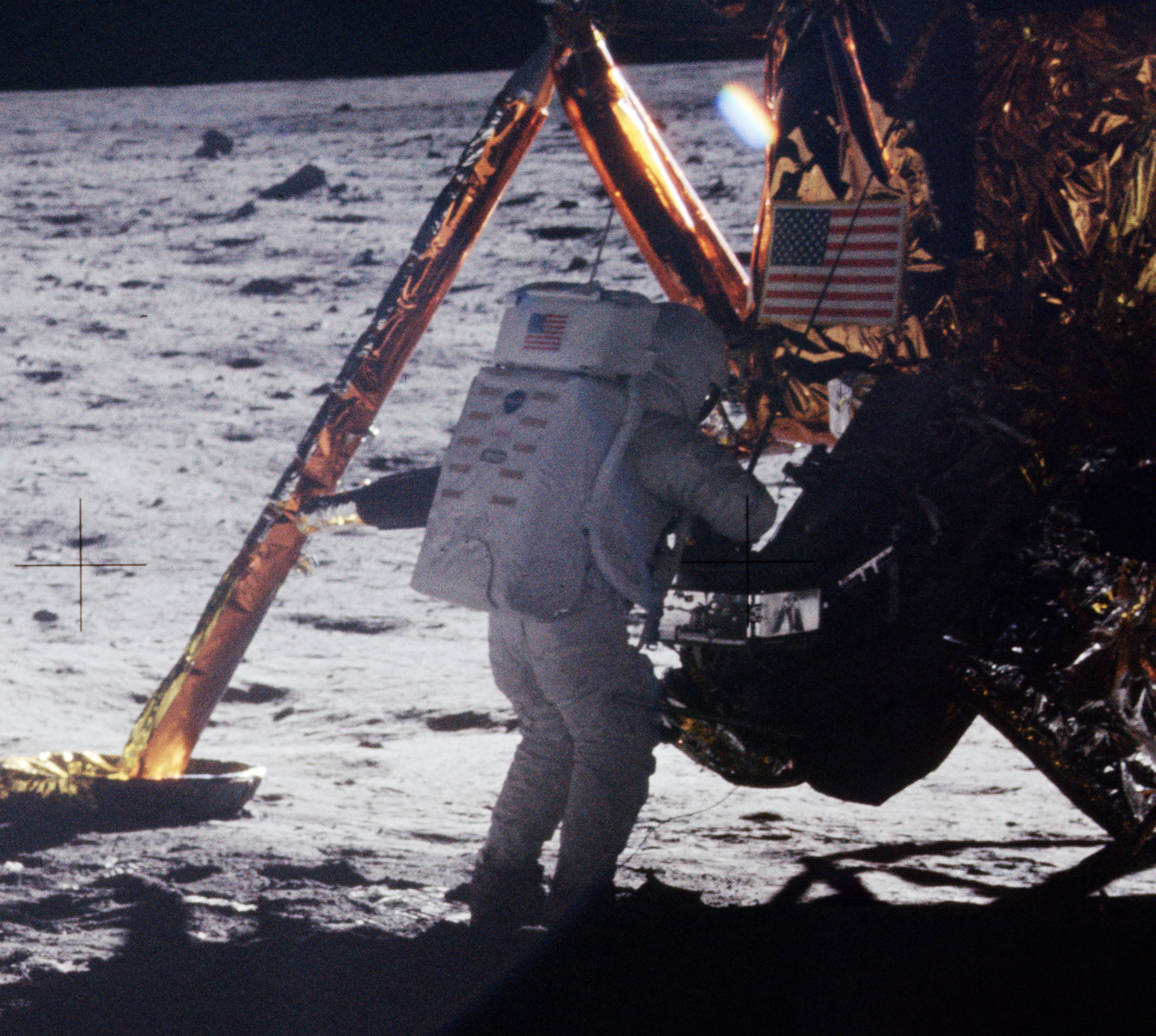
Neil Armstrong on the Moon

- January 14 – Soyuz programme: The Soviet Union launches Soyuz 4.
- January 15 – Soyuz programme: The Soviet Union launches Soyuz 5.
- January 16 – First successful docking of two crewed spacecraft in orbit and the first transfer of crew from one space vehicle to another (by a space walk) between Soyuz 5 and Soyuz 4.
- January 18 – Failure of Soyuz 5's service module to separate correctly causes a near-fatal re-entry (not publicly acknowledged until 1997) but the module makes a hard landing in the Ural Mountains.
- March 3 – Apollo program: NASA launches Apollo 9 to test the lunar module.
- March 13 – Apollo program: Apollo 9 returns safely to Earth after testing the Lunar Module.
- May 16 – Venera program: Venera 5, a Soviet spaceprobe, lands on Venus.
- May 17 – Venera program: Soviet Venera 6 begins to descend into Venus', atmosphere sending back atmospheric data before being crushed by pressure.
- May 18 – Apollo program: Apollo 10 launches.
- May 22 – Apollo program: Apollo 10's lunar module flies within 15,400 m of the Moon's surface.
- May 26 – Apollo program: Apollo 10 returns to Earth after a successful eight-day test of all the components needed for the upcoming first human Moon landing.
- July 17 – The New York Times publicly retracts its ridicule of the rocket scientist Robert H. Goddard published on 13 January 1920 which stated that spaceflight is impossible.
- July 20 – Apollo program: 20:17 UTC – The human race, represented by Neil Armstrong and Buzz Aldrin, lands on the Moon in the Apollo 11 Lunar Module Eagle. At 02:56 UTC on July 21 (22:56 ET July 20), Armstrong takes the first human step on the Moon's surface. Apollo 11 lifted off for the Moon on July 16 and returns safely on July 24.
- July 21 – Luna programme: 2 hours before the Apollo 11 lunar module lifts off from the Moon's surface, the Soviet uncrewed craft Luna 15, launched on July 13 and intended to return samples from the Moon, crashes in Mare Crisium.
- August 5 – Mariner program: Mariner 7 makes its closest fly-by of Mars (3,524 kilometers).
- September 20 – Comet 67P/Churyumov–Gerasimenko is identified by Soviet astronomers Klim Churyumov and Svetlana Gerasimenko.
- November 14 – Apollo program: NASA launches Apollo 12, the second crewed mission to the surface of the Moon.
- November 19 – Apollo program: Apollo 12 astronauts Charles Conrad and Alan Bean land at Oceanus Procellarum ("Ocean of Storms") and become the third and fourth humans to walk on the Moon.

== Biology ==
- Thomas D. Brock and Hudson Freeze of Indiana University publish their findings on hyperthermophilic bacteria, most notably Thermus aquaticus, a thermophilic bacterium species living at a temperature of 60-80 °C in a hot spring at Yellowstone National Park. T. aquaticus (Taq) later becomes a standard source of enzymes able to withstand higher temperatures than those from E. Coli and is significant in the history of polymerase chain reaction.
- Last Przewalski's Horse sighted in the wild, in Mongolia.
- Marked decline in common whitethroats due to Sahel drought draws attention to effects of climate on migratory species.

== Chemistry ==
- Dorothy Hodgkin and colleagues at the University of Oxford determine the structure of insulin.

== Computer science ==
- April 7 – RFC 1, the first Request for Comments document from the Internet Engineering Task Force, is published.
- October 29 – The first ARPANET message is sent, between computers at the University of California, Los Angeles (UCLA) and Stanford Research Institute.
- November 21 – The first permanent ARPANET link is established, between Interface Message Processors at UCLA and Stanford.
- The B programming language is developed at Bell Labs by Ken Thompson and Dennis Ritchie.
- CCD invented at AT&T Bell Labs, used as the electronic imager in still and video cameras.
- The laser printer is invented at Xerox by Gary Starkweather.
- Initial release of Multics ("Multiplexed Information and Computing Service"), an influential early time-sharing operating system based on the concept of a single-level memory.

== Medicine ==
- March – The condition diffuse panbronchiolitis is named, in Japan.
- April 4 – Surgeons Denton Cooley and Domingo Liotta implant the first temporary artificial heart.
- May 15 – A teenager known as 'Robert R.' dies in St. Louis, Missouri, of a baffling medical condition. In 1984 it will be identified as the earliest confirmed case of HIV/AIDS in North America. The first strain of the AIDS virus (HIV) has probably migrated to the United States via Haiti.
- International adoption of the diagnostic term 'Sudden infant death syndrome'.
- Frederick Pei Li and Joseph F. Fraumeni Jr. characterize the inherited increased susceptibility to multiple forms of cancer that becomes known as Li–Fraumeni syndrome.
- Wolf Wolfensberger publishes "The Origin and Nature of Our Institutional Models", influential in the move away from a medical model of disability towards the deinstitutionalisation of those with intellectual disability.

== Meteorology ==
- Late January – Eugene, Oregon, has a record snowfall of 3 feet in 3 days: a pineapple express moves into the region with a shot of cold air, followed by some snow showers.
- Herbert Saffir and Bob Simpson develop the Saffir-Simpson Hurricane Scale.

== Paleontology ==
- John Ostrom publishes his findings on the dinosaur Deinonychus, describing it as being a small, agile species closely related to the birds.

== Physics ==
- Yoichiro Nambu and Leonard Susskind make the first presentations of string theory.
- Spain withdraws from CERN.

== Awards ==
- Nobel Prizes
  - Physics – Murray Gell-Mann
  - Chemistry – Derek Harold Richard Barton, Odd Hassel
  - Medicine – Max Delbrück, Alfred D. Hershey, Salvador Luria
- Turing Award – Marvin Minsky

== Births ==
- October 7 – Karen L. Nyberg, American space engineer and astronaut.
- December 16 – Adam Riess, American astrophysicist, Nobel laureate in Physics in 2011.
- December 28 – Linus Torvalds, Finnish computer programmer.
- Nicola Fox, English-born heliophysicist and space scientist.
- Thomas Reardon, American computer programmer.

== Deaths ==
- March 3 – Elizabeth Laird (born 1874), Canadian physicist.
- April 8 – Zinaida Aksentyeva (born 1900), Ukrainian/Soviet astronomer and geophysicist.
- May 8 – Sir Sydney Smith (born 1883), New Zealand-born forensic pathologist.
- May 14 – Walter Pitts (born 1923), American logician and cognitive psychologist.
- June 1 – Michiyo Tsujimura (born 1888), Japanese agricultural scientist
- June 18 – Edgar Anderson (born 1897), American botanist
- June 24 – Willy Ley (born 1906), German American scientific populariser.
- August 8 – Otmar von Verschuer (born 1896), German eugenicist.
- August 9 – C. F. Powell (born 1903), British physicist, Nobel Prize laureate in 1950.
- August 17 – Otto Stern (born 1888), German physicist, Nobel laureate in Physics in 1943.
- September 16 – Henry Fairfield Osborn, Jr. (born 1887), American conservationist.
- September 24 – Warren Sturgis McCulloch (born 1898), American neurophysiologist and cybernetician.
- October 21 – Wacław Sierpiński (born 1882), Polish mathematician.
- November 12 – William F. Friedman (born 1891), Russian American cryptanalyst.
