= 1962 in science =

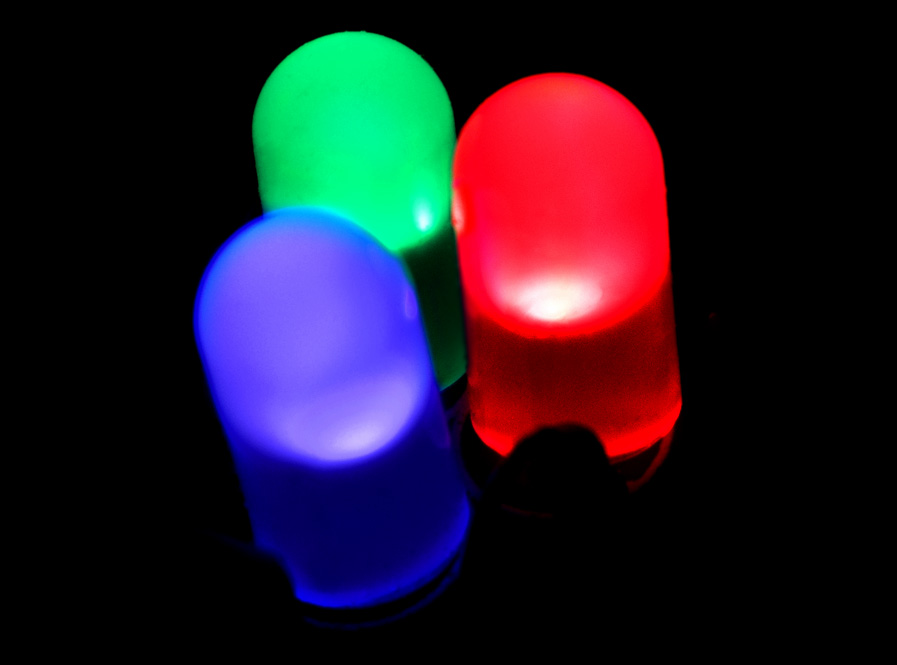
Light Emitting Diodes, or LEDs

The year 1962 in science and technology involved some significant events, listed below.

== Astronomy and space exploration ==
- January 26 – The Ranger 3 space probe is launched to study the Moon, but later misses it by 22,000 miles.
- February 4–5 – During a new moon and total solar eclipse, an extremely rare grand conjunction of the classical planets occurs, including all five of the naked-eye planets plus the Sun and Moon, all within 16° of each another on the ecliptic.
- February 19 – Penumbral lunar eclipse.
- February 20 – Mercury program: While aboard Friendship 7, John Glenn orbits the Earth three times in 4 hours, 55 minutes, becoming the first American to do so.
- April 26
  - The Ranger 4 spacecraft crashes into the Moon. It is also the first spacecraft to impact the far side of the Moon.
  - First successful launch of a Zenit reconnaissance satellite, Kosmos 4, by the Soviet Union (although few satisfactory photographs are obtained on this mission).
- May 24 – Mercury program: Scott Carpenter becomes the second American to orbit the Earth aboard Aurora 7.
- July 17 – Penumbral lunar eclipse.
- July 11 – First live transatlantic television broadcast from the United States to Britain, via AT&T's Telstar, the world's first active, direct relay communications satellite (launched the previous day on a NASA Delta rocket from Cape Canaveral) and Goonhilly Satellite Earth Station.
- July 22 – Mariner program: The Mariner 1 spacecraft flies erratically several minutes after launch and has to be destroyed.
- July 31 – Annular solar eclipse.
- August 5 – 3C 273, the first object to be identified as a quasar, is found by John Bolton with the radio telescope at the Parkes Observatory in New South Wales.
- August 15 – Penumbral lunar eclipse.
- September 29 – The Canadian Alouette 1, the first satellite built outside the United States or the Soviet Union, is launched from Vandenberg Air Force Base in California.
- December 14 – Mariner program: The Mariner 2 spacecraft flies by Venus, the first to carry out a successful planetary encounter.
- Olin Eggen, Donald Lynden-Bell, and Allan Sandage theorize galaxy formation by a single (relatively) rapid monolithic collapse, with the halo forming first, followed by the disk.

== Biology ==
- May 1 – Douglas Harold Copp discovers of the hormone calcitonin.
- August – The "Hastings Rarities" are exposed as ornithological frauds.
- Emile Zuckerkandl and Linus Pauling publish a paper introducing what will become known as the molecular clock concept.
- The first nude mouse strain is discovered by N. R. Grist at Ruchill Hospital's Brownlee virology laboratory in Glasgow.
- The Neuroscience Research Program (NRP) is established by Francis O. Schmitt et al.

== Computer science ==
- May – J. C. R. Licklider of BBN co-presents a paper on "On-Line Man-Computer Communication".
- August – J. C. R. Licklider begins to refer to the Intergalactic Computer Network, effectively conceptualizing what will become the Internet.
- September 19 – The first ICT 1301 business mainframe sold, "Flossie", is installed at Senate House (University of London). It will still be operable 50 years later.
- October – J. C. R. Licklider becomes the first head of the computer research program at the United States Department of Defense's ARPA, which he names the Information Processing Techniques Office (IPTO).
- November 3 – The earliest recorded use of the term "personal computer" features in The New York Times in a story about John Mauchly's speech the day before to the American Institute of Industrial Engineers. Mauchly, "inventor of some of the original room-size computers", says that "in a decade or so" everyone would have their own computer with "exchangeable wafer-thin data storage files to provide inexhaustible memories and answer most problems". He is quoted as saying, "There is no reason to suppose the average boy or girl cannot be master of a personal computer."
- December 7 – The Atlas supercomputer, the most powerful in the world at this date, is dedicated at the University of Manchester in England. It is the first system designed for multiprogramming, and will be in use for the next decade.
- December 28 – Mauchly is again reported as saying he "envisions a time when everyone will carry his own personal computer".
- At MIT, Ivan Sutherland uses the TX-2 computer to write Sketchpad, the origin of graphical programs used for computer-aided design.
- Roger Tomlinson leads development of the Canada Geographic Information System, the world's first geographic information system (GIS).
- Simula I, the first object-oriented programming language, developed at the Norwegian Computing Center in Oslo by Ole-Johan Dahl and Kristen Nygaard, is released.

== Ecology ==
- June – Rachel Carson's Silent Spring begins serialization in The New Yorker; it is released as a book on September 27.

== History of science ==
- Thomas Kuhn's The Structure of Scientific Revolutions is published in the United States.

== Medicine ==
- November – English orthopedic surgeon John Charnley makes the first successful whole hip replacement operation using a high molecular weight polyethylene (HMWP) socket, at Wrightington Hospital, Wigan.
- James W. Black synthesises propranolol, the first beta blocker (used for regulation of angina pectoris), which becomes the world's best-selling drug.
- Joseph Murray performs the first permanent cadaveric kidney transplantation.
- Nodding disease is first documented, in southern Tanzania.
- Wade-Dahl-Till valve, a cerebral shunt, is developed by hydraulic engineer Stanley Wade, author Roald Dahl and neurosurgeon Kenneth Till.

== Physics ==
- The muon neutrino is discovered by Leon M. Lederman.

== Psychology ==
- Stanley Schachter and Jerome E. Singer propose their two-factor theory of emotion.

== Technology ==
- October – The first practical visible-spectrum (red) light-emitting diode is developed by Nick Holonyak Jr., while working at the General Electric Company in Syracuse, New York.
- The New Austrian Tunnelling method is so named.

== Awards ==
- Fields Prize in Mathematics: Lars Hörmander and John Milnor
- Nobel Prizes
  - Physics – Lev Davidovich Landau
  - Chemistry – Max Ferdinand Perutz, John Cowdery Kendrew
  - Medicine – Francis Harry Compton Crick, James Dewey Watson, Maurice Hugh Frederick Wilkins
  - Peace – Linus Pauling
- Maxwell Medal and Prize of the Institute of Physics (first award): Abdus Salam

== Births ==
- April 27 – Edvard Moser, Norwegian neuroscientist, recipient of the Nobel Prize in Physiology or Medicine.
- April – Sarah Gilbert, English vaccinologist.
- May 17 – Ferenc Krausz, Hungarian-born attosecond physicist, recipient of the Nobel Prize in Physics.
- June 18 – Lisa Randall, American theoretical physicist.
- June 29 – George D. Zamka, American astronaut.
- September 20 – Jim Al-Khalili, Iraqi-born British theoretical physicist and science communicator.
- October 6 – David Baker, American biochemist and computational biologist, recipient of the Nobel Prize in Chemistry.
- Michele Dougherty, South African-born space physicist.

== Deaths ==
- February 19 – Georgios Papanikolaou (born 1883), Greek American inventor of the Pap smear.
- March 15 – Arthur Compton (born 1892), American physicist, recipient of the Nobel Prize in Physics.
- March 19 – Samuel Cate Prescott (born 1872), American food scientist and microbiologist.
- March 24 – Auguste Piccard (born 1884), Swiss physicist and explorer.
- April 27 – Willem Karel Dicke (born 1905), Dutch pediatrician.
- May 13 – Henry Trendley Dean (born 1893), American dental researcher.
- July 28 – Natan Yavlinsky (born 1912), Russian nuclear physicist, in aviation accident.
- July 29 – Ronald Fisher (born 1890), English-born statistician and geneticist.
- November 5 – Paul Lester Errington (born 1902), American conservationist.
- November 18 – Niels Bohr (born 1885), Danish physicist.
- December 20 – Emil Artin (born 1898), Austrian-born mathematician.
- December 24 – Wilhelm Ackermann (born 1896), German mathematician.
