= Laramie Formation =

Geological formation in Colorado, US

- Stratigraphic range: Maastrichtian, 69–68 Ma
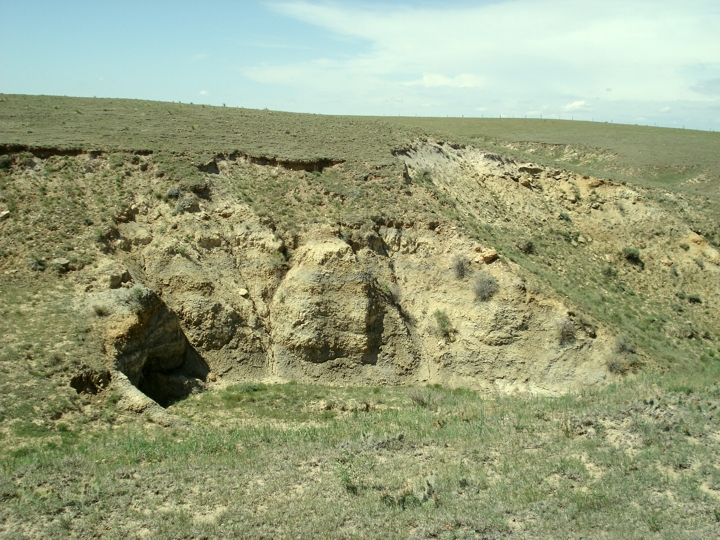
- A typical outcrop of the Laramie Formation in northeastern Colorado.
- Type: Geological formation
- Underlies: Arapahoe Formation
- Overlies: Fox Hills Formation
- Thickness: 200-400 ft (60-120 m)

Lithology
- Primary: Sandstone, mudstone, clay, coal

Location
- Region: Colorado
- Country: United States

Type section
- Named by: Clarence King

The Laramie Formation is a geologic formation of the Late Cretaceous (Maastrichtian) age, named by Clarence King in 1876 for exposures in northeastern Colorado, in the United States. It was deposited on a coastal plain and in coastal swamps that flanked the Western Interior Seaway. It contains coal, clay and uranium deposits, as well as plant and animal fossils, including dinosaur remains. The formation contains some of the oldest records of grass in western North America.

== Stratigraphy and Lithology ==
The Laramie Formation is exposed around the edges of the Denver Basin and ranges from 400 to 500 feet (120–150 m) on the western side of the basin, and 200–300 feet (60–90 m) thick on the eastern side. It rests conformably on the Fox Hills Sandstone and unconformably underlies the Arapahoe Conglomerate. The formation can be divided into an unnamed lower member containing bedded sandstone, clay and coal; and an unnamed upper member composed predominately of 90 to 190 m of drab-colored mudstone, some sandstone, and thin coal beds. Nodular ironstone concretions occur in the mudstones that contain plant remains. Some of the material in the sandstones originated from silicic volcanoes far to the west.

== Resources ==
The coal and clay deposits of the Laramie Formation were once economically important. Clay mining began in the Golden, Colorado area in 1877 and continued until the mid-twentieth century. Most of the clay was used to make bricks and tiles for building construction.

It is estimated that about 130 million short tons of sub-bituminous coal were mined from the Laramie Formation between 1884 and 1979, mostly from seams in the lower part of the formation. Where the seams are relatively flat lying or gently dipping most of the mines were underground room and pillar operations, and where the seams are steeply inclined to vertical, stope mining was used. Relatively little surface mining was done.

The Laramie Formation also hosts uranium deposits. The Leyden Coal Mine produced uranium for a few years as a byproduct of the coal mining. Uranium deposits also occur in sandstones of the Laramie Formation in Weld County, Colorado, and near the town of Grover, Colorado. (See Uranium mining in Colorado)

== Paleofauna ==
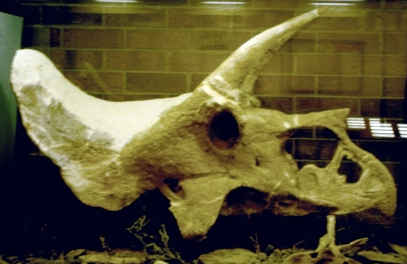
Skull of Triceratops from the Laramie Formation. This skull may be the oldest known for the genus. Currently on display at the courthouse in Greeley, Colorado

Fossil vertebrates from the Laramie Formation were among the first dinosaurs to be discovered in the American West (Carpenter and Young 2003). In 1873, Edward D. Cope accompanied Ferdinand V. Hayden, who was leader of the U.S. Geological and Geographical Survey of the Territories. The route of the expedition included eastern Colorado where Cope collected specimens in what is now the Laramie Formation along Bijou Creek on the east side of the Denver Basin (Cope, 1874).

Cope named three species of dinosaurs without description: Cinodon arctatus (later changed to Cionodon arctatus), Polyonax mortuarius and Agathaumas milo (later renamed Hadrosaurus occidentalis). These specimens are currently in the American Museum of Natural History. These specimens are very scrappy and the names no longer considered valid. Subsequent discoveries of dinosaurs occur through the formation, and include a nearly complete skull of Triceratops. Non-dinosaur vertebrates also occur (Carpenter 1979).

More recent work in and around the Pawnee National Grasslands in Weld County has produced a diverse collection of 10 different fossil mammal species, including six multituberculates and four therians.

List of Fossil Vertebrates (data from Carpenter 1979; Hutchinson and Holroyd 2003)

=== Cartilaginous fishes ===
Cartilaginous fishes of the Laramie Formation
Genus	Species	Location	Stratigraphic position	Abundance	Notes
Texatrygon	cf. T. avonicola				Ptychotrygonidae
Lonchidion	L. selachos				Lonchidiidae
Myledaphus	M. bipartitus				Rhinobatidae
Restesia	R. americana				Orectolobidae

=== Bony fishes ===
Bony fishes of the Laramie Formation
Genus	Species	Location	Stratigraphic position	Abundance	Notes	Images
Amia	Indeterminate				Amiidae	A living Amia.
Atractosteus	A. occidentalis?				Lepisosteidae	A living Amia.

=== Amphibians ===
Amphibians of the Laramie Formation
Genus	Species	Location	Stratigraphic position	Abundance	Notes	Images
Albanerpeton	A. nexuosus				Albanerpetontidae	Albanerpeton
Lisserpeton	L. bairdi				Scapherpetontidae	Albanerpeton
Opisthotriton	O. kayi				Batrachosauroididae	Albanerpeton
Scapherpeton	S. tectum				Scapherpetontidae	Albanerpeton

=== Turtles ===
Turtles of the Laramie Formation
Genus	Species	Location	Stratigraphic position	Abundance	Notes
Adocus	Indeterminate				Adocidae
Basilemys	cf. B. sinuosa				Nanhsiungchelyidae
Compsemys	C. victa				Pleurosternidae
Helopanoplia	cf. H. distincta				Trionychidae
Plesiobaena	cf. P. antique				Baenidae

=== Squamates ===
Squamates of the Laramie Formation
Genus	Species	Location	Stratigraphic position	Abundance	Notes
Odaxosaurus	O. piger				Anguidae
Chamopsiidae	Indeterminate				Informally known as the Laramie chamopsiid

=== Crocodilians ===
Crocodilians of the Laramie Formation
Genus	Species	Location	Stratigraphic position	Abundance	Notes	Images
Borealosuchus	B. sternbergii					
Brachychampsa	B. montana					

=== Dinosaurs ===
Color key: Taxon / Reclassified taxon / Taxon falsely reported as present / Dubious taxon or junior synonym / Ichnotaxon / Ootaxon / Morphotaxon	Notes; Uncertain or tentative taxa are in small text; ~~crossed out~~ taxa are discredited.

Dinosaurs reported from the Laramie Formation
Genus	Species	Location	Stratigraphic position	Material	Notes	Images
Ceratopsipes	C. goldenensis					
Dromaeosaurus	Indeterminate					Dromaeosaurus
cf. Edmontonia	Indeterminate				Nodosauridae (possibly Denversaurus)	Edmontonia
Edmontosaurus	E. annectens					Edmontosaurus
Ornithomimus	O. minutus			"Partial metatarsals II-IV."	The specimens are now lost.	Ornithomimus
Paronychodon	Indeterminate					
Thescelosaurus	T. sp.			Two teeth	Thescelosauridae	Thescelosaurus
Torosaurus	T. latus				Ceratopsidae	Torosaurus
Triceratops	T. horridus				Ceratopsidae	Triceratops
Tyrannosaurus	T. rex				Tyrannosauridae	Tyrannosaurus

=== Mammals ===
Mammals of the Laramie Formation
Genus	Species	Location	Stratigraphic position	Abundance	Notes
Gypsonictops	Indeterminate				Leptictidae
Meniscoessus	Indeterminate				Cimolodontidae
cf. Mesodma	Indeterminate				Neoplagiaulacidae
Cimolomys	Indeterminate				
cf. Cimolodon	Indeterminate				

== Paleoflora ==
Fossil pollen (palynomorphs) include bryophyte and pteridophyte spores, gymnosperm pollen, and abundant angiosperm pollen, including Aquilapollenites striatus, Ilexpollenites compactus, Interpollis cf. I. supplingensis, and Tricolpites interangulus. The palynomorphs indicate an early Maastrichtian age (68-69 mya), which is supported by magnetostratigraphy. Magnetostratigraphy also shows that the Laramie Formation becomes progressively younger eastward as deposition followed the regression of the Western Interior Seaway.

Fossil leaves are abundant, especially in the shales and sandstones associated with coal. Dicot angiosperms dominate, with lesser amounts of ferns, palms, and herbaceous lycopods. Conifers are rare. Common plants include "Ficus" planicostata, "Myrica" torreyi, Sabalites sp., Platanites marginata, and Marmarthia pearsonii.

Color key: Taxon / Reclassified taxon / Taxon falsely reported as present / Dubious taxon or junior synonym / Ichnotaxon / Ootaxon / Morphotaxon	Notes; Uncertain or tentative taxa are in small text; ~~crossed out~~ taxa are discredited.

Flora of the Laramie Formation
Genus	Species	Location	Stratigraphic position	Abundance	Notes	Images
Aquilapollenites	Aquilapollenites striatus					Ficus Myrica
"Ficus"	"Ficus" planicostata					Ficus Myrica
Ilexpollenites	Ilexpollenites compactus					Ficus Myrica
Interpollis	Interpollis cf. I. supplingensis					Ficus Myrica
Marmarthia	Marmarthia pearsonii					Ficus Myrica
"Myrica"	"Myrica" torreyi					Ficus Myrica
Platanites	Platanites marginata					Ficus Myrica
Phragmites	Phragmites falcata					Ficus Myrica
Sabalites	Sabalites sp.					Ficus Myrica
Tricolpites	Tricolpites interangulus					Ficus Myrica

== See also ==
- List of dinosaur-bearing rock formations
