= 1889 in science =

The year 1889 in science and technology involved some significant events, listed below.

== Biology ==
- February 17 – The Royal Society for the Protection of Birds is founded in Manchester (England), originally known as "The Plumage League" to campaign against the use of plumage in women's clothing.
- Francis Galton publishes Natural Inheritance, a book which summarizes the results of a number of his papers and inspires Karl Pearson, Raphael Weldon and others to develop the mathematics and statistics of inheritance and biometry.
- Joseph von Mering and Oskar Minkowski at the University of Strasbourg demonstrate that a function of the mammalian pancreas is to produce the hormone insulin, the lack of which leads to diabetes mellitus.
- Hugo de Vries publishes Intracellular Pangenesis, a book which postulates the existence of genes.

== Chemistry ==
- April – British chemists Frederick Abel and James Dewar file their first patent for the smokeless propellant cordite.
- Svante Arrhenius provides a physical explanation for the Arrhenius equation on the reaction rate constant.

== Earth sciences ==
- July 28 – 1889 Kumamoto earthquake, recorded as far away as Potsdam, Germany.
- October 6 – Mount Kilimanjaro's summit is first reached, by German geologist Hans Meyer.
- Returning to France from his expedition up the Niger River, Louis Gustave Binger reveals that the Mountains of Kong do not exist.

== History of science ==
- Adolf Erik Nordenskiöld publishes the Facsimile-Atlas to the Early History of Cartography in Stockholm.

== Mathematics ==
- Joseph Louis François Bertrand publishes Calcul des probabilités ("Calculation of probabilities") containing the Bertrand's box paradox in probability theory.
- Giuseppe Peano publishes Arithmetices principia, nova methodo exposita ("The principles of arithmetic presented by a new method") containing the Peano axioms for the natural numbers.

== Medicine ==
- May – Johns Hopkins Hospital opens in Baltimore, Maryland, with senior founding staff comprising pathologist William Henry Welch, surgeon William Stewart Halsted, gynecologist Howard Atwood Kelly and internist William Osler, who originates the concept of a residency for training junior doctors.
- The 1889–1890 flu pandemic originates in the Russian Empire.

== Paleontology ==
- First Barosaurus remains excavated in the Morrison Formation of South Dakota by Othniel Charles Marsh and John Bell Hatcher of Yale University.

== Psychology ==
- The Müller-Lyer illusion is devised.

== Technology ==
- January 8 – Herman Hollerith receives a patent in the United States for his electric tabulating machine.
- March 12 – Almon B. Strowger, an undertaker in Topeka, Kansas, files a patent in the United States for an automatic telephone exchange using the Strowger switch.
- May 6–October 31 – Exposition Universelle in Paris, with the Eiffel Tower as its entrance arch. At 300 m, the tower's height exceeds the previous tallest structure in the world by 130 m. The Galerie des machines, designed by architect Ferdinand Dutert and engineer Victor Contamin, at 111 m, spans the longest interior space in the world at this time.
- June 3 – The first long distance electric power transmission line in the United States is completed, running 14 miles (23 km) between a generator at Willamette Falls and downtown Portland, Oregon.
- November 23 – The first jukebox goes into operation, in San Francisco.
- An early method of high-voltage direct current transmission as developed by Swiss engineer René Thury is implemented commercially in Italy by the Acquedotto de Ferrari-Galliera company, transmitting 630 kW at 14 kV DC over a distance of 120 km.
- Probable date – Car to the design of Siegfried Marcus completed in Vienna.

== Awards ==
- Copley Medal: George Salmon
- Wollaston Medal for Geology: Thomas George Bonney

== Births ==
- January 17 – Ralph H. Fowler (died 1944), English physicist and astronomer.
- March 21 – Frederick Osborn (died 1981), American philanthropist and eugenicist.
- April 21 – Paul Karrer (died 1971), Swiss winner of Nobel Prize in Chemistry.
- May 18 – Thomas Midgley Jr. (died 1944), American chemist and inventor.
- June 4 – Beno Gutenberg (died 1960), German-born seismologist.
- June 23 – Verena Holmes (died 1964), English mechanical engineer and inventor.
- July 18 – Axel Boëthius (died 1969), Swedish archeologist of Etruscan culture.
- July 30 (O.S. July 17) – Vladimir K. Zworykin (died 1982), Russian-born pioneer of television technology.
- August 1 – Walter Gerlach (died 1979), German physicist.
- August 7 – Léon Brillouin (died 1969), French physicist.
- August 11 – Ross T. McIntire (died 1960), American naval surgeon.
- September 7 – Mary Barkas (died 1959 or 1961), New Zealand psychiatrist.
- September 28 – Hugh Whistler (died 1943), English ornithologist of India.
- November 20 – Edwin Hubble (died 1953), American astronomer.
- November 24 – William Justin Kroll (died 1973), Luxembourgish metallurgist.
- December 21 – Sewall Wright (died 1988), American geneticist.
- December 29 – Vera Fedorovna Gaze (died 1954), Russian astronomer.
- John Ryle (died 1950), English physician and epidemiologist.

== Deaths ==
- January 4 – Mary Philadelphia Merrifield (born 1804), English algologist.
- February 8 – Roberto Duarte Silva (born 1837), Portuguese chemist.
- March 8 – John Ericsson (born 1803), Swedish American mechanical engineer and inventor.
- March 16 – Ernst Wilhelm Leberecht Tempel (born 1821), German astronomer.
- March 22 – Sophia Wilkens (born 1817), Swedish pioneer in the education of students with intellectual disability.
- April 19 – Warren De La Rue (born 1815), British astronomical photographer.
- June 28 – Maria Mitchell (born 1818), American astronomer.
- July 30 – Miles Joseph Berkeley (born 1803), English botanist.
- August 21 (O.S. August 9) – Nikolai Annenkov (born 1819), Russian botanist.
- October 11 – James Joule (born 1818), English physicist.
- October 18 – Antonio Meucci (born 1808), Italian American inventor.
