= 1879 in science =

The year 1879 in science and technology involved some significant events, listed below.

== Astronomy ==
- British children's writer and amateur astronomer Agnes Giberne publishes the popular illustrated book Sun, Moon and Stars: Astronomy for Beginners which sells 24,000 copies on both sides of the Atlantic in twenty years.

== Biology ==
- April 26 – The National Park, later renamed the Royal National Park, is declared in New South Wales, Australia, the world's second oldest purposed national park (after Yellowstone in the United States), and the first to use the term "national park".
- Jean Henri Fabre publishes the first of his Souvenirs entomologiques.
- Heinrich Anton de Bary coins the term symbiosis in his monograph Die Erscheinung der Symbiose (Strasbourg).

== Cartography ==
- Peirce quincuncial projection developed by Charles Sanders Peirce.

== Chemistry ==
- January 2 – Publication of first issue of Journal of the American Chemical Society.
- Per Teodor Cleve discovers the elements holmium and thulium.
- Lars Fredrik Nilson discovers the element scandium.
- Constantin Fahlberg working with Ira Remsen at Johns Hopkins University discovers saccharin.
- Rodolphe Lindt invents the conching machine for use in chocolate manufacture.
- Otto Schott develops a glass containing lithium. It is the first glass type that has a homogeneity allowing spectrometric measurements.

== Earth sciences ==
- Vasily Dokuchaev introduces the concept of pedology, laying the foundations for the modern study of soil science.
- Ferdinand André Fouqué publishes Santorin et ses éruptions, a significant text in volcanology.

== History of science ==
- Carl Schorlemmer publishes The Rise and Development of Organic Chemistry.

== Mathematics ==
- Charles L. Dodgson publishes Euclid and his Modern Rivals in London.
- Gottlob Frege publishes Begriffsschrift, eine der arithmetischen nachgebildete Formelsprache des reinen Denkens ("Concept-Script: A Formal Language for Pure Thought Modeled on that of Arithmetic") in Halle, a significant text in the development of mathematical logic.
- Felix Klein first describes the Grünbaum–Rigby configuration.

== Medicine ==
- British psychiatrist James Crichton-Browne publishes "On the weight of the brain and its component parts in the insane", a key paper in the neuropathology of insanity.
- London physician William Murrell reports the successful use of nitroglycerin as medication for angina.
- Viennese physician Felix von Winiwarter provides an early description of Thromboangiitis obliterans.

== Meteorology ==
- George Stokes perfects the Campbell–Stokes recorder (for sunshine).

== Paleontology ==
- Camptosaurus prestwichii found at Cumnor, near Oxford.

== Pharmacology ==
- Vassili von Anrep of the University of Würzburg demonstrate the analgesic properties of cocaine.

== Physics ==
- Edwin Hall discovers the Hall Effect.
- Joseph Stefan originates the Stefan–Boltzmann law, stating that the total radiation from a black body is proportional to the fourth power of its thermodynamic temperature.

== Psychology ==
- Wilhelm Wundt creates the first laboratory of experimental psychology at the University of Leipzig.

== Technology ==
- February 3 – Mosley Street in Newcastle upon Tyne (England) becomes the world's first public highway to be lit by the electric incandescent light bulb invented by Joseph Swan.
- May 31 – Werner von Siemens demonstrates the first electric locomotive using an external power source at Berlin.
- June 6 – William Denny and Brothers launch the world's first ocean-going ship to be built of mild steel, the SS Rotomahana, on the River Clyde in Scotland.
- October 22 – Thomas Edison successfully tests a carbon filament thread in an incandescent light bulb.
- December 31 – Carl Benz completes his first petrol two-stroke engine.
- A heavy oil engine is built by Jacob Morrison of Norton, County Durham, England.

== Awards ==
- Copley Medal: Rudolf Clausius
- Wollaston Medal: Bernhard Studer

== Births ==
- January 1 – Ernest Jones (died 1958), Welsh psychoanalyst.
- February 1 – Henri Chrétien (died 1956), French astronomer and optical inventor.
- February 22 – J. N. Brønsted (died 1947), Danish physical chemist.
- March 8 – Otto Hahn (died 1968), German physicist and winner of the 1944 Nobel Prize in Chemistry.
- March 10 – Wu Lien-teh (died 1960), Malayan Chinese physician.
- March 14 – Albert Einstein (died 1955), German-born physicist and winner of the 1921 Nobel Prize in Physics.
- May 28 – Milutin Milanković (died 1958), Serbian geophysicist.
- June 3 – Raymond Pearl (died 1940), American biologist.
- August 29 – May Smith (died 1968), English experimental psychologist.
- October 9 – Max von Laue (died 1960), German physicist and winner of the 1914 Nobel Prize in Physics.
- December 28 – Arthur O. Austin (died 1964), American electrical engineer.

== Deaths ==
- January 24 – Heinrich Geißler (born 1814), German scientific instrument maker.
- March 3 – William Kingdon Clifford (born 1845), English geometer.
- April 4 – Heinrich Wilhelm Dove (born 1803), Prussian physicist and climatologist.
- April 16 – Peter Kosler (born 1824), Carniolan geographer and cartographer.
- April 23 – Elisabetta Fiorini Mazzanti (born 1799), Italian botanist.
- May 4 – William Froude (born 1810), English hydrodynamicist.
- May 29 – Pierre Adolphe Piorry (born 1794), French physician.
- August 26 – Édouard Chassaignac (born 1804), French surgeon.
- November 5 – James Clerk Maxwell (born 1831), Scottish-born mathematician and physicist.
