= 1888 in science =

The year 1888 in science and technology involved some significant events, listed below.

== Events ==
- May 8–November – International Exhibition of Science, Art and Industry, in Glasgow, Scotland.

== Astronomy ==
- January 3 – The 91 cm refracting telescope at Lick Observatory is first used. The James Lick telescope is the largest refractor in the world at this time, and the observatory is the first established at the top of a mountain.
- August 22 – Earliest evidence of a death and injury by a meteorite, in Sulaymaniyah, Iraq.
- The 76 cm refracting telescope is completed at Nice Observatory.
- John Louis Emil Dreyer's New General Catalogue is published.

== Biology ==
- June 30 – The Marine Biological Association of the United Kingdom opens its laboratory on Plymouth Hoe.
- Seventeen biologists found the Marine Biological Laboratory in Woods Hole, Massachusetts, USA, which will become a major center of applied research.
- Peter Hermann Stillmark describes the isolation of ricin, thus founding the field of lectinology.

== Chemistry ==
- Methyl isocyanate is discovered.
- Henri-Louis Le Chatelier states that the response of a chemical system perturbed from equilibrium will be to counteract the perturbation.
- Emil Fischer establishes the relation between glucose, fructose and mannose by passage to a common osazone.

== Geography ==
- January 27 – The National Geographic Society is founded in Washington, D.C. by Gardiner Greene Hubbard.

== Geology ==
- July 15 – 1888 eruption of Mount Bandai: An explosive eruption of the stratovolcano Mount Bandai in the Fukushima Prefecture of Japan results in pyroclastic flows and the deaths of at least 477 people. Japanese geologists Seikei Sekiya and Y. Kikuchi from the Imperial University of Tokyo visit Bandai within days of the eruption and, after spending several months studying the new crater and the devastated areas, publish a report in English which is considered a classic in volcanology.

== Mathematics ==
- The American Mathematical Society is founded by Thomas Fiske.
- Hilbert's basis theorem is first proved by David Hilbert.
- Francis Galton introduces the concept of correlation in statistics.
- Richard Dedekind publishes Was sind und was sollen die Zahlen? ("What are numbers and what should they be?") which includes his definition of an infinite set.
- Sofia Kovalevskaya discovers the 'Kovalevskaya top'.

== Meteorology ==
- The global atmospheric temperature returns to normal, five years after the 1883 eruption of Krakatoa (Krakatau). The volcanic dust veil, that has created spectacular atmospheric effects, also acted as a solar-radiation filter, lowering global temperatures by as much as 1.2 degrees Celsius in the year after the eruption.

== Physics ==
- Heinrich Rudolf Hertz discovers radio waves.

== Physiology and medicine ==
- Carlo Martinotti describes cortical cells later known as Martinotti cells.
- Emile Roux and Alexandre Yersin isolate diphtheria toxin.
- Heinrich Wilhelm Gottfried von Waldeyer-Hartz names the chromosome.
- German ophthalmologist Adolf Gaston Eugen Fick constructs and fits the first successful glass contact lens.

== Technology ==
- January 3 – Marvin Stone is granted a United States patent for the paper drinking straw.
- April – American engineer Oliver B. Shallenberger invents a practical AC induction electricity meter.
- May 1 – Nikola Tesla is granted a US patent for the induction motor.
- May 15 – Emile Berliner is granted a US patent for the gramophone record.
- August 10 – Gottlieb Daimler flies in an airship designed by Dr. Frederich Wölfert powered by a Daimler Motoren Gesellschaft-built petrol engine.
- September 4 – George Eastman is granted a US patent for his roll film camera, for which he registers the trademark Kodak.
- October 3 – The first patent for a ballpoint pen is granted to John Loud, a British tanner who wishes to produce a writing instrument that can write on leather.
- October 14 – Louis Le Prince shoots the first recorded film, Roundhay Garden Scene, in Leeds, England, using a single lens camera and Eastman paper film.
- December 7 – John Boyd Dunlop patents the pneumatic bicycle tyre.

== Awards ==
- Copley Medal: Thomas Henry Huxley
- Wollaston Medal for Geology: Henry Benedict Medlicott

== Births ==
- February 14 – Robert Remak (died 1942), German mathematician.
- February 17 – Otto Stern (died 1969), German-born physicist, Nobel laureate in Physics in 1943.
- March 16 – Anton Köllisch (died 1916), German chemist noted for synthesising MDMA
- May 13 – Inge Lehmann (died 1993), Danish seismologist.
- June 12 – Zygmunt Janiszewski (died 1920), Polish mathematician.
- July 5 – Herbert Spencer Gasser (died 1963), American physiologist, Nobel laureate in Physiology or Medicine in 1944.
- July 22 – Selman Waksman (died 1973), Ukrainian-born Jewish-American biochemist and microbiologist.
- July 23 – Ivan Magill (died 1986), Irish-born anaesthesiologist.
- August 13 – John Logie Baird (died 1946), Scottish-born inventor.
- September 17 – Michiyo Tsujimura (died 1969), Japanese agricultural scientist
- November 15 – Harald Ulrik Sverdrup (died 1957), Norwegian meteorologist and oceanographer.
- November 24 – Eduard Pernkopf (died 1955), Austrian anatomist.
- November 30 – Ralph Hartley (died 1970), American electrical engineer.

== Deaths ==
- January 19 – Heinrich Anton de Bary (born 1831), German surgeon, botanist, microbiologist and mycologist.
- February 22 – Anna Kingsford (born 1846), English physician, anti-vivisectionist and vegetarian.
- March 9 – Robert Gordon Latham (born 1812), English ethnologist and philologist.
- March 15 – Squire Whipple (born 1804), American civil engineer.
- April 1 – Jules Émile Planchon (born 1823), French botanist.
- May 21 – Friedrich Gerke (born 1801), German pioneer of telegraphy.
- August 23 – Philip Henry Gosse (born 1810), English science writer.
- August 24 – Rudolf Clausius (born 1822), German physicist.
- September 12 – Richard A. Proctor (born 1837), English astronomer.
- September 30 – Eunice Newton Foote (born 1819), American physicist and women's rights campaigner.
- October 25 – Theodor Kjerulf (born 1825), Norwegian geologist.
- November 1 – Nikolay Przhevalsky (born 1839), Russian explorer.
