= 1884 in science =

The year 1884 in science and technology involved some significant events, listed below.

== Chemistry ==
- October 14 – George Eastman is granted his first patents for photographic roll film in the United States.
- J. H. van 't Hoff proposes the Arrhenius equation for the temperature dependence of the reaction rate constant, and therefore, rate of a chemical reaction.
- Hermann Emil Fischer proposes the structure of purine, a key component in many biomolecules, which he synthesizes in 1898; he also begins work on the chemistry of glucose and related sugars.
- Henry Louis Le Chatelier develops Le Chatelier's principle, which explains the response of dynamic chemical equilibria to external stresses.
- Paul Vieille invents Poudre B, the first smokeless powder for firearms.

== Climatology ==
- The Köppen climate classification scheme is first published by German-Russian botanist Wladimir Köppen.

== Mathematics ==
- Georg Cantor introduces the Cantor function.
- Gottlob Frege publishes Die Grundlagen der Arithmetik ("The Foundations of Arithmetic") presenting a theory of logicism.
- Edwin Abbott Abbott (as "A Square") publishes Flatland: A Romance of Many Dimensions, a mathematical novella.

== Medicine ==
- January 7 – German microbiologist Robert Koch isolates Vibrio cholerae, the cholera bacillus, working in India. Koch and Friedrich Loeffler formulate Koch's postulates on the causal relationship between microbes and diseases. Loeffler also discovers the causative organism for diphtheria, Corynebacterium diphtheriae.
- Dr Takaki Kanehiro of the Imperial Japanese Navy conducts a controlled experiment demonstrating that deficient diet is the cause of beriberi, but mistakenly concludes that sufficient protein alone would prevent it.
- Georg Theodor Gaffky isolates the pathogenic bacillus salmonella typhi as the cause of typhoid fever.
- Ophthalmologist Karl Koller announces his use of a local anesthetic (cocaine) in surgery; Jellinek also demonstrates cocaine's effects as an anesthetic on the respiratory system.
- Friedrich Schultze first describes the disorder that will become known as Charcot–Marie–Tooth disease.
- First known case of artificial insemination by sperm donation: William H. Pancoast, a professor in Philadelphia, takes sperm from his "best looking" student to inseminate an anesthetized woman without her knowledge, not reported for 25 years.
- Among the papers on brain function published by Vladimir Bekhterev is a study on the formation of the human conception of space.

== Physics ==
- Ludwig Boltzmann derives the Stefan–Boltzmann law on blackbody radiant flux from thermodynamic principles.

== Technology ==
- February 12 – Lewis Waterman gets his first patent for a capillary feed fountain pen in the United States.
- May 16 – Angelo Moriondo of Turin is granted a patent for an espresso machine.
- June 13 – LaMarcus Adna Thompson opens the "Gravity Pleasure Switchback Railway" at Coney Island, New York City.
- October – Hiram Maxim first demonstrates the Maxim gun, the first self-powered machine gun (using recoil operation).
- Fall – Chester H. Pond invents the first electrical self-winding clock.
- Charles Parsons invents the modern steam turbine.
- Charles Renard and Arthur Constantin Krebs make a fully controllable free-flight in French Army airship La France with an electric motor.
- Hungarian engineers Károly Zipernowsky, Ottó Bláthy and Miksa Déri invent the closed core high efficiency transformer and AC parallel power distribution.
- Thomas Parker builds a practical production electric car in Wolverhampton (England) using his own specially designed high-capacity rechargeable batteries.
- Mexican General Manuel Mondragón designs an early form of the Mondragón rifle, the world's first automatic rifle.
- Edward Butler files a patent for his petroleum motor tricycle.

== Other events ==
- September 24 – Smeaton's Tower opened to the public on Plymouth Hoe as a monument to the history of civil engineering.
- October 22 – International Meridian Conference in Washington, D.C. fixes the Greenwich meridian as the world's prime meridian.
- Sophie Bryant becomes the first woman in England to be awarded the degree of Doctor of Science, by the University of London. Also in this year, she is the first woman to publish a paper with the London Mathematical Society.
- Sofia Kovalevskaya is appointed "Professor Extraordinarius" in mathematics at Stockholm University and becomes the editor of Acta Mathematica.

== Awards ==
- Copley Medal: Carl Ludwig
- Wollaston Medal for Geology: Albert Jean Gaudry

== Births ==
- January 26 – Edward Sapir (died 1939), Pomeranian-born anthropological linguist.
- January 28
  - Auguste Piccard (died 1962), Swiss physicist and explorer.
  - Jean Piccard (died 1963), Swiss-born chemist and explorer.
- March 24 – Chika Kuroda (died 1968), Japanese chemist.
- July 2 – Alfons Maria Jakob (died 1931), German neuropathologist.
- July 4 – Eleanor Williams (died 1963), Australian bacteriologist and serologist.
- February 23 – Casimir Funk (died 1967), Polish biochemist, coiner of the term vitamin.
- August 5 – Ludwik Hirszfeld (died 1954), Polish microbiologist and serologist.
- August 31 – George Sarton (died 1956), Flemish historian of science.
- November 8 – Hermann Rorschach (died 1922), Swiss psychiatrist.

== Deaths ==
- January 6 – Gregor Mendel (born 1822), Silesian geneticist.
- February 7 – Johann Friedrich Julius Schmidt (born 1825), German astronomer.
- May 10 – Charles-Adolphe Wurtz (born 1817), Alsatian French chemist.
- May 12 – Robert Angus Smith (born 1817), British atmospheric chemist.
- May 13 – Cyrus McCormick (born 1809), American inventor.
- July 18 – Ferdinand von Hochstetter (born 1829), German geologist.
- July 20 – Sir Caesar Hawkins (born 1798), English surgeon.
- November 3 - Antoine Constant Saucerotte (born 1805), French physician
- November 11 – Alfred Brehm (born 1829), German zoologist.
- November 25 – Hermann Kolbe (born 1818), German chemist.
