= 1881 in science =

The year 1881 in science and technology involved some significant events, listed below.

== Astronomy ==
- 22 May – John Tebbutt discovers the long-period comet, C/1881 K1 (also known as the Great Comet of 1881, Comet Tebbutt, 1881 III, 1881b).

== Biology ==
- October – Charles Darwin publishes his last scientific book The Formation of Vegetable Mould through the Action of Worms.
- L. S. Poliakov describes the wild horse discovered by Nikolai Przhevalsky in Mongolia in 1879 as a new species, Przewalski's horse (Equus przewalski poliakov).
- The first systematic study in forensic entomology is conducted by physician and entomologist Hermann Reinhard in Germany.

== Chemistry ==
- Friedrich Beilstein publishes the first edition of his Handbuch der organischen Chemie.

== History of science and technology ==
- The birch bark Bakhshali manuscript, incorporating perhaps the earliest known use of mathematical zero, is unearthed near Bakhshali in British India.
- Publication in England of a pioneering study in industrial archaeology, H. A. Fletcher's "The archaeology of the west Cumberland iron trade".

== Mathematics ==
- Simon Newcomb makes the first statement of Benford's law.

== Medicine ==
- July 13 – Dr. George Goodfellow performs the first laparotomy to remove a bullet.
- September 25 – The first modern Caesarean section is performed successfully by German gynecologist Ferdinand Adolf Kehrer in Meckesheim using the transverse incision technique.
- December – Eduard von Hofmann carries out autopsy studies of the nearly 400 victims of the Vienna Ringtheater fire, carbon monoxide poisoning being held an underlying cause of death.
- Louis Pasteur discovers a vaccine for anthrax.
- Carlos Finlay, a Cuban doctor, first proposes that yellow fever is transmitted by mosquitoes rather than direct human contact.
- French obstetrician Étienne Stéphane Tarnier introduces a form of neonatal incubator (couveuse) for routine care of premature infants at the Paris Maternité.
- English ophthalmologist Waren Tay publishes the first description of the genetic disorder which will become known as Tay–Sachs disease.
- approx. date – The non-invasive sphygmomanometer, for the measurement of blood pressure, is invented by Samuel Siegfried Karl von Basch.

== Metrology ==
- The International Congress of Electricians, meeting in Paris, makes significant progress in definition of the International System of Units.

== Technology ==
- March 1 – The Cunard Line's SS Servia, the first steel transatlantic liner, is launched at J. & G. Thomson's yard at Clydebank in Scotland.
- May 16 – The Gross-Lichterfelde Tramway, the world's first electric tramway, is opened in Berlin by Siemens & Halske.
- June – The positive-buoyancy powered submarine "Fenian Ram" (Holland Boat No. II), designed by John Philip Holland, is first submersion-tested in New York City.
- August 30 – French inventor Clément Ader demonstrates his théâtrophone system which delivers the first example of transmitted binaural 2-channel stereophonic sound, delivered over telephone wires from the operatic stage of the Palais Garnier to the International Exposition of Electricity in Paris.
- September 26 – Godalming becomes the first town in England to have its streets illuminated by electric light (hydroelectrically generated).
- October 10 – Richard D'Oyly Carte's Savoy Theatre opens in London, the world's first public building to be fully lit by electricity, using Joseph Swan's incandescent light bulbs. The stage is first lit electrically on December 28.
- December 21 – SS Aberdeen, the first oceangoing ship successfully powered by a triple expansion steam engine, designed by Alexander Carnegie Kirk, is launched at Robert Napier and Sons' yard at Govan in Scotland.
- Nikolay Benardos introduces carbon arc welding, the first practical arc welding method.
- Peter Herdic patents the Herdic horse-drawn cab in the United States.

== Awards ==
- Copley Medal: Karl Adolph Wurtz
- Wollaston Medal for Geology: Peter Martin Duncan

== Births ==
- January 29 – Alice Catherine Evans (died 1975), American microbiologist.
- January 31 – Irving Langmuir (died 1957), American chemist.
- March 17 – Walter Rudolf Hess (died 1973), Swiss physiologist, recipient of the Nobel Prize in Physiology or Medicine.
- April 28 – Edith A. Roberts (died 1977), American plant ecologist.
- May 1 – Pierre Teilhard de Chardin (died 1955), French paleontologist and philosopher.
- August 6 – Alexander Fleming (died 1955), British bacteriologist.
- September 18 – Vera Lebedeva (died 1968), Soviet Russian pediatrician.
- October 4 – George Constantinescu (died 1965), Romanian engineer.
- October 11 – Lewis Fry Richardson (died 1953), British mathematical physicist.
- October 22 – Clinton Davisson (died 1958), American physicist.
- November 9 – Margaret Reed Lewis (died 1970), American cell biologist.
- November 13 – Ludwig Koch (died 1974), German Jewish animal sound recordist.

== Deaths ==
- February 3 – John Gould (born 1804), English zoologist.
- March 26 – Lovisa Åhrberg (born 1801), Swedish surgeon.
- May 14 – Mary Seacole (born 1805), Jamaican-born nurse.
- May 19 – Joseph Barnard Davis (born 1801), English craniologist, physician and anthropologist.
- May 26 – Jakob Bernays (born 1824), German philologist.
- June 16 – George Rolleston (born 1829), English physician and zoologist.
- June 23 – Matthias Jakob Schleiden (born 1804), German biologist.
- June 29 – Maurice Raynaud (born 1834), French physician.
- July 27 – Hewett Watson (born 1804), English biologist.
- October 31 – George W. DeLong (born 1844), American Arctic explorer.
- November 30 – Jean-Alfred Gautier (born 1793), Swiss astronomer
