= 1887 in science =

The year 1887 in science and technology involved many significant events, listed below.

== Astronomy ==
- April – Carte du Ciel project initiated by Paris Observatory director Amédée Mouchez.
- Theodor von Oppolzer's Canon der Finsternisse, a compilation of the 8,000 solar and 5,200 lunar eclipses from 1200 BC until 2161 AD, is published posthumously.

== Biology ==
- Jean Pierre Mégnin publishes Faune des Tombeaux ("Fauna of the Tombs"), the founding work of modern forensic entomology.
- Sergei Winogradsky discovers the first known form of lithotrophy during his research with Beggiatoa.
- The Petri dish is created by German bacteriologist Julius Richard Petri.

== Chemistry ==
- Amphetamine is first synthesized in Germany by Romanian chemist Lazăr Edeleanu, who names it phenylisopropylamine.
- Otto Schott produces 'Normalthermometerglas' (family of Borosilicate glass) for the first time.

== Cartography ==
- Guyou hemisphere-in-a-square projection developed by Émile Guyou.

== Climate ==
- January 28 – In a snowstorm at Fort Keogh, Montana, in the United States, the largest snowflakes on record are reported. They are 15 inches (38 cm) wide and 8 inches (20 cm) thick.
- September 28 – Start of the Yellow River floods in China: 900,000 dead.

== Conservation ==
- June 23 – The Rocky Mountains Park Act becomes law in Canada, creating that nation's first national park, Banff National Park.

== Earth sciences ==
- February 23 – The French Riviera is hit by a large earthquake, killing around 2,000 along the coast of the Mediterranean Sea.
- In Hawaii, the Mauna Loa volcano eruptions subside, having begun in 1843. During the 1887 eruption, about 2½ million tons (2.3 million metric tons) of lava per hour pours out, covering an area of 29 km^{2}.

== Linguistics ==
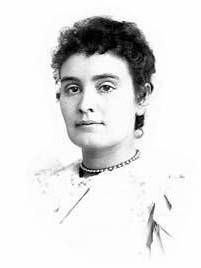
Anne Sullivan

- March 3 – Anne Sullivan begins to teach language to the deaf and blind Helen Keller.
- July 26 – L. L. Zamenhof publishes Lingvo internacia ("International language") under the pseudonym "Doktoro Esperanto".

== Mathematics ==
- Joseph Louis François Bertrand rediscovers Bertrand's ballot theorem.
- Henri Poincaré provides a solution to the three-body problem.
- The Schröder–Bernstein theorem in set theory is first published by Georg Cantor (without proof) and (on July 11) first proved by Richard Dedekind (without publication).

== Medicine ==
- January 11 – Louis Pasteur's anti-rabies treatment is defended in the French Academy of Medicine by Dr. Joseph Grancher.
- August – The U.S. National Institutes of Health is founded at the Marine Hospital, Staten Island, NY, as the Laboratory of Hygiene.
- October 1 – Hong Kong College of Medicine for Chinese founded by Patrick Manson.
- Paediatrician Samuel Gee gives the first modern-day description of coeliac disease in children in a lecture at Great Ormond Street Hospital for sick children in London.>
- Surgeon Franz König publishes "Über freie Körper in den Gelenken" in the journal Deutsche Zeitschrift für Chirurgie, first describing (and naming) the disease Osteochondritis dissecans.
- The Hospitals Association establishes the first (non-statutory and voluntary) register of nurses in the United Kingdom.

== Physics ==
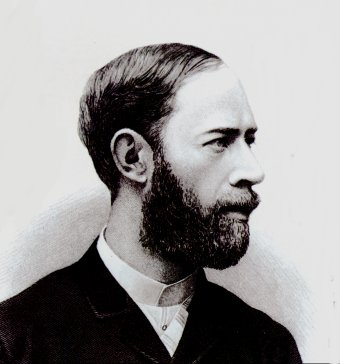
Heinrich Hertz

- November – The Michelson–Morley experiment is performed, indicating that the speed of light is independent of motion.
- Heinrich Hertz discovers the photoelectric effect on the production and reception of electromagnetic waves in radio, an important step towards the understanding of the quantum nature of light.

== Psychology ==
- November – G. Stanley Hall founds The American Journal of Psychology.
- Richard Hodgson and S. J. Davey, in the course of investigations into popular belief in parapsychology, publish one of the first descriptions of eyewitness unreliability.

== Technology ==
- March 8 – Everett Horton of Connecticut patents a fishing rod of telescoping steel tubes.
- March 13 – Chester Greenwood patents earmuffs.
- June 8 – Herman Hollerith receives a U.S. patent for his punched card calculator.
- July – James Blyth operates the first working wind turbine at Marykirk in Scotland.
- July 19 – Dorr Eugene Felt receives the first U.S. patent for his comptometer.
- August – Anna Connelly patents a fire escape.
- October 18 – Jacob Fitzgerald and William H. Silver are granted a U.S. patent for a "potato masher and fruit crusher", a form of potato ricer.
- November 8 – Emile Berliner is granted a U.S. patent for his Gramophone.
- Adolf Gaston Eugen Fick invents the contact lens, made of a type of brown glass.
- English engineer James Atkinson invents his "Cycle Engine".
- Mexican general Manuel Mondragón patents the Mondragón rifle, the world's first automatic rifle.
- Alfred Yarrow completes the first practical high-pressure water-tube Yarrow boiler, for a torpedo boat.

== Organizations ==
- March 7 – North Carolina State University is established as North Carolina College of Agriculture and Mechanic Arts.
- October 3 – Florida A&M University opens its doors in Tallahassee, Florida.

== Publications ==
- Publication in Barcelona of Enrique Gaspar's El anacronópete, the first work of fiction to feature a time machine.

== Awards ==
- June – William Armstrong created 1st Baron Armstrong of Cragside, the first engineer to be raised to the Peerage of the United Kingdom
- Copley Medal: Joseph Dalton Hooker
- Wollaston Medal for Geology: John Whitaker Hulke

== Births ==
- January 7 – Kurt Schneider (died 1967), German psychiatrist.
- January 15 – Henry Fairfield Osborn, Jr. (died 1969), American conservationist.
- January 28 – Edmund Jaeger (died 1983), American naturalist.
- April 20 – Margaret Newton (died 1971), Canadian plant pathologist.
- June 22 – Julian Huxley (died 1975), English biologist and populariser of science.
- July 30 – Felix Andries Vening Meinesz (died 1966), Dutch geophysicist.
- August 18 – Erwin Schrödinger (died 1961), Austrian physicist.
- September 26 – Barnes Wallis (died 1979), English aeronautical engineer.
- October 11 – María Teresa Ferrari (died 1956), Argentine physician.
- November 10 – Elisa Leonida Zamfirescu (died 1973), Romanian engineer.
- November 19 – James B. Sumner (died 1955), American winner of the 1946 Nobel Prize in Chemistry.
- November 23 – Henry Moseley (killed 1915), English physicist.
- November 25 (November 13 Old Style) – Nikolai Vavilov (died 1943), Russian plant pathologist.
- December 13 – George Pólya (died 1985), Hungarian mathematician.
- December 22 – Srinivasa Ramanujan (died 1920), Indian mathematician.
- December 27 – Edward Andrade (died 1971), English physicist.

== Deaths ==
- January 22 – Joseph Whitworth (born 1803), English mechanical engineer.
- February 26 – Anandi Gopal Joshi (born 1865), Indian physician.
- July 17 – Henry William Ravenel (born 1814), American botanist.
- July 18 – Dorothea Dix (born 1802), American mental health reformer.
- August 2 – Joseph-Louis Lambot (born 1814), French inventor of ferrocement.
- August 15 – Julius von Haast (born 1824), German geologist.
- August 19
  - Spencer Fullerton Baird (born 1823), American ornithologist and ichthyologist.
  - Alvan Clark (born 1804), American telescope manufacturer.
- October 7 (O.S. September 25) – Lev Tsenkovsky (born 1822), Russian biologist.
- October 17 – Gustav Kirchhoff (born 1824), German physicist.
- November 18 – Gustav Fechner (born 1801), German psychologist.
