= 1877 in paleontology =

List of years in paleontology	(table)
- … 1867; 1868; 1869; 1870; 1871; 1872; 1873; 1874; 1875; 1876; 1877; 1878; 1879; 1880; 1881; 1882; 1883; 1884; 1885; 1886; 1887 …
- In science 1874 1875 1876 1877 1878 1879 1880
- Art; Archaeology; Architecture; Literature; Music; Philosophy; Science; +...

Paleontology or palaeontology is the study of prehistoric life forms on Earth through the examination of plant and animal fossils. This includes the study of body fossils, tracks (ichnites), burrows, cast-off parts, fossilised feces (coprolites), palynomorphs and chemical residues. Because humans have encountered fossils for millennia, paleontology has a long history both before and after becoming formalized as a science. This article records significant discoveries and events related to paleontology that occurred or were published in the year 1877.

== Arthropods ==
=== Newly named crustaceans ===
Name	Novelty	Status	Authors	Age	Unit	Location	Notes	Images
Anthrapalaemon woodwardi	Sp nov	jr synonym	Robert Etheridge, Junior	Visean		UK; Scotland	Moved to the genus Tealliocaris in 1908	

=== Newly named insects ===
Name	Novelty	Status	Authors	Age	Type locality	Country	Notes	Images
Anthomyia burgessi	Sp nov	nomen dubium	Scudder	?Ypresian	Quesnel ?Fraser Formation	Canada; British Columbia	An anthomyiid fly. Considered nomen dubium without discussion by Michelsen (1996).	Anthomyia burgessi (1890 illustration)
Anthomyia inanimata	Sp nov	nomen dubium	Scudder	?Ypresian	Quesnel ?Fraser Formation	Canada; British Columbia	An anthomyiid fly. Considered nomen dubium without discussion by Michelsen (1996).	Anthomyia inanimata (1890 illustration)
Aphaenogaster longaeva	Sp nov	nomen dubium	Scudder	?Ypresian	Quesnel ?Fraser Formation	Canada; British Columbia	A myrmicine ant, possibly nomen dubium.	Aphaenogaster longaeva (1890 illustration)
Boletina sepulta	Sp nov	valid	Scudder	?Ypresian	Quesnel ?Fraser Formation	Canada; British Columbia	A fungus gnat.	Boletina sepulta (1890 illustration)
Brachypeza abita	Sp nov	valid	Scudder	?Ypresian	Quesnel ?Fraser Formation	Canada; British Columbia	A mycetophiline fungus gnat.	Brachypeza abita (1890 illustration)
Brachypeza procera	Sp nov	valid	Scudder	?Ypresian	Quesnel ?Fraser Formation	Canada; British Columbia	A mycetophiline fungus gnat.	Brachypeza procera (1890 illustration)
Calyptites	Gen et sp nov	valid	Scudder	?Ypresian	Quesnel ?Fraser Formation	Canada; British Columbia	An ant of uncertain placement.	Calyptites antediluvianum (1890 illustration)
Formica arcana	Sp nov	valid	Scudder	?Ypresian	Quesnel ?Fraser Formation	Canada; British Columbia	A formicine ant	Formica arcana (1890 illustration)
Hypoclinea obliterata	Sp nov	jr synonym	Scudder	?Ypresian	Quesnel ?Fraser Formation	Canada; British Columbia	A dolichoderine ant Moved to Dolichoderus obliteratus (1893)	Dolichoderus obliteratus (1890 illustration)
Heteromyza senilis	Sp nov	valid	Scudder	?Ypresian	Quesnel ?Fraser Formation	Canada; British Columbia	A heleomyzid fly.	Heteromyza senilis (1890 illustration)
Lachnus petrorum	Sp nov	jr synonym	Scudder	?Ypresian	Quesnel ?Fraser Formation	Canada; British Columbia	An aphidomorph of uncertain placement Moved to Geranchon petrorum (1890)	Geranchon petrorum (1890 illustration)
Liometopum pingue	Sp nov	valid	Scudder	Ypresian	Green River Formation	USA; Colorado	An ant species, moved to Eoformica pingue in 1930	Eoformica pinguis
Lithortalis	Gen et sp nov	valid	Scudder	?Ypresian	Quesnel ?Fraser Formation	Canada; British Columbia	A picture-winged fly. Type species L. picta	Lithortalis picta (1890 illustration)
Lonchaea senescens	Sp nov	valid	Scudder	?Ypresian	Quesnel ?Fraser Formation	Canada; British Columbia	A lauxaniid fly. Referred to Lauxaniidae without redescription.	"Lonchaea" senescens (1890 illustration)
Palloptera morticina	Sp nov	valid	Scudder	?Ypresian	Quesnel ?Fraser Formation	Canada; British Columbia	A flutter-wing fly.	Palloptera morticina (1890 illustration)
Pimpla decessa	Sp nov	valid	Scudder	?Ypresian	Quesnel ?Fraser Formation	Canada; British Columbia	A pimpline ichneumon parasitic wasp	Pimpla decessa (1890 illustration)
Pimpla saxea	Sp nov	valid	Scudder	?Ypresian	Quesnel ?Fraser Formation	Canada; British Columbia	A pimpline ichneumon parasitic wasp	Pimpla saxea (1890 illustration)
Pimpla senecta	Sp nov	valid	Scudder	?Ypresian	Quesnel ?Fraser Formation	Canada; British Columbia	A pimpline ichneumon parasitic wasp	Pimpla senecta (1890 illustration)
Prometopia depilis	Sp nov	valid	Scudder	?Ypresian	Quesnel ?Fraser Formation	Canada; British Columbia	A sap beetle	Prometopia depilis (1890 illustration)
Sciomyza revelata	Sp nov	valid	Scudder	?Ypresian	Quesnel ?Fraser Formation	Canada; British Columbia	A marsh fly.	Sciomyza revelata (1890 illustration)
Trichonta dawsoni	Sp nov	valid	Scudder	?Ypresian	Quesnel ?Fraser Formation	Canada; British Columbia	A mycetophiline fungus gnat.	Trichonta dawsoni (1890 illustration)

== Fish ==
Name	Novelty	Status	Authors	Age	Unit	Location	Notes	Images
Heliobatis	gen et sp nov.	Valid	Marsh	Wasatchian	Green River Formation	USA	One of two stingrays from the Green River Formation. The type species is H. radians.	Heliobatis radians

== Non-dinosaurian reptiles ==
Name	Novelty	Status	Authors	Age	Unit	Location	Notes	Images
Dasygnathus		Junior synonym	Huxley	Late Triassic	Lossiemouth Sandstone Formation	Scotland	An indeterminate pseudosuchian whose name was preoccupied by MacLeay (1819), later renamed Dasygnathoides by Kuhn (1961). The type species is D. longidens.	
Palaeoctonus		Nomen dubium	Cope	Late Triassic		US	Dubious genus of misidentified phytosaur.	
Suchoprion		Nomen dubium	Cope			US	Dubious genus of misidentified phytosaur.	

== Dinosaurs ==
=== Laelaps trihedrodon, Cope criticizes Dryptosaurus ===
O. W. Lucas collected the first remains of what would later in the year be named Laelaps trihedrodon from Quarry I of the Saurian Hill at Garden Park, Colorado. Edward Drinker Cope would describe the material later in the year in a short paper titled "On a carnivorous dinosaurian from the Dakota beds of Colorado." The "Dakota beds" he references are actually Morrison Formation strata. Cope claims to have a skeleton of unspecified completeness on which to establish the new species, but only describes a partial dentary which has 5 successional teeth, 2 functional teeth, and one tooth missing from its socket. All of the preceding material has since been lost to science with the exception of 5 broken, partial tooth crowns. From the now missing dentary, Cope infers that the creature is a carnivore and compares its dentition to that belonging to other members of his infamous genus "Laelaps", L. aquilunguis and L. incrassatus. Cope concludes the paper with a pointed criticism of his rival O. C. Marsh's attempt to rename Laelaps as the genus Dryptosaurus because the generic name Laelaps has been used in entomology. Cope claims that since the mite genus Laelaps was a synonym that the name was not truly preoccupied and Marsh's erection of Dryptosaurus has therefore created a new, redundant synonym of Laelaps the dinosaur. However, subsequent researchers have supported Marsh's new name.

=== Apatosaurus ===
- Apatosaurus specimen found with preserved gastroliths.

=== New genera ===
Name	Status	Authors	Age	Location	Notes	Images
Allosaurus	Valid	Marsh	Late Jurassic (Kimmeridgian-Tithonian)	Portugal; US (Colorado, Montana, New Mexico, Oklahoma, South Dakota, North Dakota,Nebraska,Kansas,Texas,Arizona,Utah,Idaho and Wyoming)	An allosaurid theropod. The type species is A. fragilis.	Allosaurus.
Amphicoelias	Nomen dubium	Cope	Late Jurassic	US (Colorado)	A diplodocoid sauropod. The type species is A. altus.	Amphicoelias true size
Apatodon	Nomen dubium	Marsh		US (Colorado)	Possible subjective synonym of Allosaurus. The type species is A. mirus.	
Apatosaurus	Valid	Marsh	Late Jurassic	US (Colorado, New Mexico, Oklahoma, Utah)	An apatosaurine diplodocid. The type species is A. ajax.	Apatosaurus
Atlantosaurus	Nomen dubium	Marsh	Late Jurassic	US	A replacement name for Titanosaurus Marsh (1877).	
Camarasaurus	Valid	Edward Drinker Cope	Late Jurassic	US (Colorado,Utah)	A camarasaurid. The type species is C. supremus.	Camarasaurus
Caulodon	Jr. synonym	Cope	Late Jurassic	US	Junior subjective synonym of Camarasaurus.	
Dryptosaurus	Valid	Othniel Charles Marsh	Late Cretaceous (Maastrichtian)	US (New Jersey)	Replacement name for Laelaps Cope (1866).	Dryptosaurus
Dystrophaeus	Valid	Cope	Late Jurassic	US	A eusauropod of unknown affinities. The type species is D. viaemalae.	
Nanosaurus	Valid	Othniel Charles Marsh	Late Jurassic	US (Colorado and Wyoming)	An ornithischian. The type species is N. agilis.	
Stegosaurus	Valid	Othniel Charles Marsh	Late Jurassic	Portugal; US (Colorado, Utah and Wyoming)	A stegosaur. The type species is S. armatus.	Stegosaurus
Tichosteus	Nomen dubium	Cope		US	Affinities unknown. The type species is T. lucasanus.	
Titanosaurus	Nomen dubium	Lydekker	Late Cretaceous (Maastrichtian)	India	A titanosaur. The type species is T. indicus.	
Titanosaurus	Preoccupied.	Marsh			Preoccupied by a genus erected by Richard Lydekker this same year, later renamed Atlantosaurus. The type species is T. montanus.	

== Synapsids ==
=== Non-mammalian ===
Name	Status	Authors	Age	Location	Notes	Images
Archaeobelus	Synonym of Clepsydrops					
Clepsydrops limbatus		Cope				

== See also ==
  - 1877 in science
