= List of North American dinosaurs =

This is a list of dinosaurs whose remains have been recovered from North America. North America has a rich dinosaur fossil record with great diversity of dinosaurs.

== History ==
The earliest potential record of dinosaurs in North America comes from rare, unidentified (possibly theropod) footprints in the Middle-Late Triassic Pekin Formation of North Carolina. However, the most reliable early record of North American dinosaurs comes from fragmentary saurischian fossils unearthed from the Late Triassic Dockum Group of Texas. Later in the Triassic period, dinosaurs left more recognizable remains, and could be identified as specific genera. Examples include Coelophysis, Chindesaurus, Gojirasaurus, and Tawa. Fossils of Tawa-like dinosaurs have also been found in South America, which has implications for paleogeography. During the Early Jurassic, dinosaurs such as Dilophosaurus, Anchisaurus, Podokesaurus, and the early thyreophoran Scutellosaurus lived in North America. The latter is thought ancestral to all stegosaurs and ankylosaurs. The Middle Jurassic is the only poorly represented period in North America, although several Middle Jurassic localities are known from Mexico. Footprints, eggshells, teeth, and fragments of bone representing theropods, sauropods, and ornithopods have been found, but none of them are diagnostic to the genus level.

VOA report about North American dinosaurs

The Late Jurassic of North America, however, is the exact opposite of the Middle Jurassic. The Late Jurassic Morrison Formation is found in several U.S. states, including Colorado, Utah, Wyoming, Montana, New Mexico, Oklahoma, South Dakota, and Texas. It is notable as being the most fertile single source of dinosaur fossils in the world. The roster of dinosaurs from the Morrison is impressive. Among the theropods, Allosaurus, Torvosaurus, Ceratosaurus, Coelurus, Ornitholestes, Tanycolagreus, Stokesosaurus, and Marshosaurus are found in the Morrison. An abundance of sauropods has been found there, including Apatosaurus, Diplodocus, Barosaurus, Brachiosaurus, Camarasaurus, Brontosaurus and Amphicoelias. Three genera of stegosaurs, Alcovasaurus, Stegosaurus and Hesperosaurus, have been found there. Finally, neornithischians found in the Morrison include Camptosaurus, Dryosaurus, and Nanosaurus.

During the Early Cretaceous, new dinosaurs evolved to replace the old ones. Sauropods were still present, but they were not as diverse as they were in the Jurassic Period. Theropods from the Early Cretaceous of North America include dromaeosaurids such as Deinonychus and Utahraptor, the carnosaur Acrocanthosaurus, and the coelurosaur Microvenator. Sauropods included Astrodon, Brontomerus, and Sauroposeidon. Ornithischians were more diverse than they were in the Jurassic Period. Tenontosaurus, Dakotadon, and Hippodraco are some of the ornithopods that lived during this time period. Ankylosaurs replaced their stegosaur cousins in the Cretaceous. Ankylosaurs from the Early Cretaceous of North America include Sauropelta and Gastonia. Therizinosaurs such as Falcarius are also known from the Early Cretaceous of North America.

Finally, during the Late Cretaceous Period, dinosaurs continued to diversify, with the Cenomanian stage seeing the rise of hadrosaurs such as Eolambia and Protohadros, as well as tyrannosaurs such as Moros intrepidus, which would make the carnosaurs, like Siats, as the continent's apex predators. These groups continued to thrive into the Turonian stage, in which therizinosaurs like Nothronychus, and larger ceratopsians such as Zuniceratops lived. During the Campanian stage of the Late Cretaceous, an enormous diversity of dinosaurs is known. Theropods included the tyrannosaurs Albertosaurus, Gorgosaurus, Daspletosaurus, Teratophoneus, Bistahieversor, and Appalachiosaurus, and the dromaeosaurids Dromaeosaurus, Saurornitholestes, Atrociraptor, and Bambiraptor. Ceratopsians, such as Pachyrhinosaurus, Styracosaurus, Centrosaurus, Monoclonius, Brachyceratops and Pentaceratops also existed. Among hadrosaurs, Hypacrosaurus, Gryposaurus, Kritosaurus, Parasaurolophus, Corythosaurus, Lambeosaurus and Prosaurolophus existed. During the latest Cretaceous, the Maastrichtian age, the diversity of dinosaurs saw a decline from the preceding Campanian stage. North American herbivorous dinosaurs from this time period include the titanosaur sauropod Alamosaurus, the ceratopsians Bravoceratops, Regaliceratops, Triceratops, Leptoceratops, Torosaurus, Ojoceratops, Nedoceratops, and Tatankaceratops (the latter two possible synonyms of Triceratops), the pachycephalosaurs Pachycephalosaurus, Sphaerotholus, Stygimoloch, and Dracorex (the latter two possible synonyms of Pachycephalosaurus), the hadrosaurs Augustynolophus, Saurolophus, and Edmontosaurus, the neornithischian Thescelosaurus, the ankylosaurid Ankylosaurus and the nodosaurids Denversaurus, Glyptodontopelta, and Edmontonia. Predatory dinosaurs from this time period included the tyrannosauroids Tyrannosaurus, Nanotyrannus, and Dryptosaurus, the ornithomimids Ornithomimus, Dromiceiomimus, Struthiomimus, the oviraptorosaurs Anzu, Leptorhynchos and Ojoraptorsaurus, the troodontids Pectinodon, Paronychodon and Troodon, the coelurosaur Richardoestesia and the dromaeosaurs Acheroraptor and Dakotaraptor.

The only recorded find of a dinosaur fossil in Central America consists of a single femur discovered from mid Cretaceous-aged deposits in Comayagua Department in the central part of Honduras. The fossil had been found in January, 1971 by Bruce Simonson and Gregory Horne, though it was later sent to the National Museum of Natural History, USA where it is deposited under catalogue number USNM PAL 181339. The discovery was not formally described until 1994 where it was identified as the femur of a small hadrosaur or iguanodontid, probably the former. The first report of a dinosaur from Central America ever however was a newspaper article published in August of 1933 by Canada's Montreal Gazette, though the story was picked up by several American newspapers. The fossil was an isolated metatarsus that had been collected by University of Pennsylvania explorer George Mason from woods near Olanchito, Honduras, though a vertebra was also mentioned to be found by locals. The bones have since been lost and their true identity remains indeterminable.

== Criteria for inclusion ==
- The genus must appear on the List of dinosaur genera.
- At least one named species of the creature must have been found in North America.

== List of North American dinosaurs ==
=== Valid genera ===
Name	Year	Formation	Location	Notes	Images
Abydosaurus	2010	Cedar Mountain Formation (Early Cretaceous, Albian)	United States (Utah)	Had a short domed crest on its skull similar to that of Giraffatitan	
Acantholipan	2018	Pen Formation (Late Cretaceous, Santonian)	Mexico (Coahuila)	Known to possess spike-like osteoderms	
Achelousaurus	1994	Two Medicine Formation (Late Cretaceous, Campanian)	United States (Montana)	Combines long spikes on the top of its frill and a low keratinous boss over its eyes and nose	
Acheroraptor	2013	Hell Creek Formation (Late Cretaceous, Maastrichtian)	United States (Montana)	One of the geologically youngest dromaeosaurids	
Acristavus	2011	Two Medicine Formation, Wahweap Formation (Late Cretaceous, Campanian)	United States (Montana; Utah)	Uniquely for a hadrosaurid, it lacked any ornamentation on its skull	
Acrocanthosaurus	1950	Antlers Formation, Arundel Formation, Cloverly Formation, Twin Mountains Formation (Early Cretaceous, Aptian to Albian)	United States (Maryland; Oklahoma; Texas; Wyoming)	Possessed elongated neural spines that would have supported a low sail or hump in life	
Acrotholus	2013	Milk River Formation (Late Cretaceous, Santonian)	Canada (Alberta)	Had a tall, oval-shaped dome	
Adelolophus	2014	Wahweap Formation (Late Cretaceous, Campanian)	United States (Utah)	Potentially a close relative of Parasaurolophus	
Agujaceratops	2006	Aguja Formation (Late Cretaceous, Campanian)	United States (Texas)	The type species was originally assigned to the genus Chasmosaurus	
Ahshislepelta	2011	Kirtland Formation (Late Cretaceous, Campanian)	United States (New Mexico)	Relatively small compared to other North American ankylosaurs	
Ahshislesaurus	2025	Kirtland Formation (Late Cretaceous, Campanian)	United States (New Mexico)	The type specimen was originally considered to belong to Kritosaurus but it has been later found to be likely more closely related to Naashoibitosaurus	
Ahvaytum	2025	Popo Agie Formation (Late Triassic, Carnian)	United States (Wyoming)	One of the oldest North American dinosaurs	
Akainacephalus	2018	Kaiparowits Formation (Late Cretaceous, Campanian)	United States (Utah)	Much of the skeleton is known, including the entirety of the skull	
Alamosaurus	1922	Ojo Alamo Formation (Late Cretaceous, Maastrichtian)	United States (New Mexico)	The first titanosaur confirmed to have crossed into North America, possibly representing a relative of South American forms	
Alaskacephale	2006	Prince Creek Formation (Late Cretaceous, Maastrichtian)	United States (Alaska)	Had an array of polygonal nodes on its squamosal	
Albertaceratops	2007	Oldman Formation (Late Cretaceous, Campanian)	Canada (Alberta)	Possessed long brow horns and a bony ridge over its nose	
Albertadromeus	2013	Oldman Formation (Late Cretaceous, Campanian)	Canada (Alberta)	The proportions of its hindlimb suggest a cursorial lifestyle	
Albertavenator	2017	Horseshoe Canyon Formation (Late Cretaceous, Maastrichtian)	Canada (Alberta)	Its discovery suggests that the diversity of small dinosaurs may be higher than previously thought	
Albertonykus	2009	Horseshoe Canyon Formation (Late Cretaceous, Maastrichtian)	Canada (Alberta)	May have used its specialized forelimbs to dig into tree trunks for feeding on termites	
Albertosaurus	1905	Horseshoe Canyon Formation (Late Cretaceous, Maastrichtian)	Canada (Alberta)	Known from more than thirty specimens, twenty-six of which are preserved together	
Aletopelta	2001	Point Loma Formation (Late Cretaceous, Campanian)	United States (California)	Would have lived in present-day Mexico. Its fossils were only found in California due to the shifting of tectonic plates	
Allosaurus	1877	Morrison Formation (Late Jurassic, Kimmeridgian to Tithonian)	United States (Colorado; Oklahoma; Utah; Wyoming)	Multiple specimens have been discovered, making it well-known both popularly and scientifically. At least three species are known from the United States, in addition to one described from Portugal	
Ampelognathus	2023	Lewisville Formation (Late Cretaceous, Cenomanian)	United States (Texas)	Originally described as a close relative of a clade containing Thescelosaurus and iguanodonts, but it was recovered as a rhabdodontomorph by subsequent research	
Amphicoelias	1878	Morrison Formation (Late Jurassic, Tithonian)	United States (Colorado)	Originally believed to date from the Cretaceous	
Anasazisaurus	1993	Kirtland Formation (Late Cretaceous, Campanian)	United States (New Mexico)	May have been a second species of Kritosaurus	
Anchiceratops	1914	Horseshoe Canyon Formation (Late Cretaceous, Campanian)	Canada (Alberta)	Had a long, rectangular frill ringed by short, triangular spikes	
Anchisaurus	1885	Portland Formation (Early Jurassic, Hettangian to Sinemurian)	United States (Connecticut; Massachusetts)	Some possible remains were originally misidentified as human skeletons	
Angulomastacator	2009	Aguja Formation (Late Cretaceous, Campanian)	United States (Texas)	The tip of its jaw was angled 45° at its anterior end, with the tooth row bent to match	
Animantarx	1999	Cedar Mountain Formation (Early Cretaceous to Late Cretaceous, Albian to Cenomanian)	United States (Utah)	Its holotype was discovered during a radiological survey of a fossil site. No bones were exposed before it was excavated	
Ankylosaurus	1908	Ferris Formation, Frenchman Formation, Hell Creek Formation, Lance Formation, Scollard Formation (Late Cretaceous, Maastrichtian)	Canada (Alberta; Saskatchewan); United States (Montana; Wyoming)	The largest and most well-known ankylosaur	
Anodontosaurus	1929	Dinosaur Park Formation, Horseshoe Canyon Formation (Late Cretaceous, Campanian to Maastrichtian)	Canada (Alberta)	Originally mistakenly believed to have been toothless	
Anzu	2014	Hell Creek Formation (Late Cretaceous, Maastrichtian)	United States (Montana; North Dakota; South Dakota)	Large and known from considerably good remains. Preserves evidence of a tall head crest	
Apatoraptor	2016	Horseshoe Canyon Formation (Late Cretaceous, Campanian)	Canada (Alberta)	Quill knobs preserved on its ulna confirm this genus had wings	
Apatosaurus	1877	Morrison Formation (Late Jurassic, Kimmeridgian to Tithonian)	United States (Colorado; New Mexico; Oklahoma; Utah; Wyoming)	Had a characteristically robust skeleton compared to other diplodocids	
Appalachiosaurus	2005	Blufftown Formation?, Demopolis Chalk, Donoho Creek Formation?, Ripley Formation?, Tar Heel/Coachman Formation? (Late Cretaceous, Campanian)	United States (Alabama; Georgia (U.S. state)? North Carolina? South Carolina?)	The most complete theropod known from the eastern side of North America	
Aquilarhinus	2019	Aguja Formation (Late Cretaceous, Campanian)	United States (Texas)	May have been a semiaquatic, coastal species that used its unusual, shovel-shaped bill to scoop up vegetation in wet sediment	
Aquilops	2014	Cloverly Formation (Early Cretaceous, Albian)	United States (Montana)	May have had a short horn protruding from its upper beak	
Ardetosaurus	2024	Morrison Formation (Late Jurassic, Kimmeridgian)	United States (Wyoming)	The holotype specimen was damaged by a museum fire	
Arkansaurus	2018	Trinity Group (Early Cretaceous, Aptian to Albian)	United States (Arkansas)	State dinosaur of Arkansas. Its generic name was in use informally even before its formal description	
Arrhinoceratops	1925	Horseshoe Canyon Formation (Late Cretaceous, Campanian to Maastrichtian)	Canada (Alberta)	Described as lacking a nasal horn although this is an artifact of preservation	
Astrodon	1865	Antlers Formation?, Arundel Formation (Early Cretaceous, Albian)	United States (Maryland; Oklahoma?)	State dinosaur of Maryland	
Astrophocaudia	2012	Paluxy Formation (Early Cretaceous, Albian)	United States (Texas)	Known from a single partial skeleton	
Athenar	2025	Morrison Formation (Late Jurassic, Tithonian)	United States (Utah)	Originally believed to be a diplodocid	
Atlantosaurus	1877	Morrison Formation (Late Jurassic, Kimmeridgian)	United States (Colorado)	Potentially synonymous with Apatosaurus, but a referred species may represent a separate taxon	
Atrociraptor	2004	Horseshoe Canyon Formation (Late Cretaceous, Maastrichtian)	Canada (Alberta)	Had a short, deep snout with enlarged teeth	
Aublysodon	1868	Judith River Formation (Late Cretaceous, Campanian)	United States (Montana)	Only known from teeth	
Augustynolophus	2014	Moreno Formation (Late Cretaceous, Maastrichtian)	United States (California)	State dinosaur of California. Originally named as a species of Saurolophus	
Avaceratops	1986	Judith River Formation (Late Cretaceous, Campanian)	United States (Montana)	Lacked the fenestrae in its frill, a feature shared only with Triceratops	
Bambiraptor	2000	Two Medicine Formation (Late Cretaceous, Campanian)	United States (Montana)	Small but well-preserved enough to display its mix of dinosaur- and bird-like features	
Barosaurus	1890	Morrison Formation (Late Jurassic, Kimmeridgian to Tithonian)	United States (South Dakota; Utah)	Similar to Diplodocus but larger and with a longer neck	
Bistahieversor	2010	Fruitland Formation, Kirtland Formation (Late Cretaceous, Campanian)	United States (New Mexico)	Analysis of its braincase suggests it behaved like tyrannosaurids despite likely not being a member of that family	
Bisticeratops	2022	Kirtland Formation (Late Cretaceous, Campanian)	United States (New Mexico)	Preserves bite marks from a tyrannosaurid	
Borealopelta	2017	Clearwater Formation (Early Cretaceous, Albian)	Canada (Alberta)	So well-preserved that several osteoderms, keratin, pigments and stomach contents are preserved in the positions they would have been in while alive, without flattening or shriveling	
Boreonykus	2015	Wapiti Formation (Late Cretaceous, Campanian)	Canada (Alberta)	One of the few dromaeosaurids known from high latitudes	
Brachiosaurus	1903	Morrison Formation (Late Jurassic, Kimmeridgian to Tithonian)	United States (Colorado; Oklahoma; Utah; Wyoming)	A high browser with a tall chest and elongated forelimbs	
Brachyceratops	1914	Two Medicine Formation (Late Cretaceous, Campanian)	United States (Montana)	Only known from juvenile remains. One specimen has been found to represent a subadult Styracosaurus ovatus	
Brachylophosaurus	1953	Judith River Formation, Oldman Formation, Wahweap Formation? (Late Cretaceous, Campanian)	Canada (Alberta); United States (Montana; Utah?)	Several specimens preserve extensive soft tissue remains	
Bravoceratops	2013	Javelina Formation (Late Cretaceous, Campanian to Maastrichtian)	United States (Texas)	Suggested to have had a single small horn on the top of its frill but this may be inaccurate	
Brontomerus	2011	Cedar Mountain Formation (Early Cretaceous, Aptian to Albian)	United States (Utah)	Possessed an enlarged ilium which supported powerful leg muscles, which it may have used to kick away predators	
Brontosaurus	1879	Morrison Formation (Late Jurassic, Kimmeridgian to Tithonian)	United States (Utah; Wyoming)	Popularly associated with Apatosaurus but a 2015 study found enough differences for it to be classified as a separate genus	
Brontotholus	2025	Oldman Formation, Two Medicine Formation (Late Cretaceous, Campanian)	Canada (Alberta); United States (Montana)	One of the largest known North American pachycephalosaurs	
Caenagnathus	1940	Dinosaur Park Formation (Late Cretaceous, Campanian)	Canada (Alberta)	One of the largest known caenagnathids	
Camarasaurus	1877	Morrison Formation, Summerville Formation? (Late Jurassic, Kimmeridgian to Tithonian)	United States (Colorado; New Mexico? Oklahoma? South Dakota? Utah; Wyoming)	Very common and known from multiple specimens	
Camposaurus	1998	Bluewater Creek Formation (Late Triassic, Norian)	United States (Arizona)	Potentially the oldest known neotheropod	
Camptosaurus	1885	Morrison Formation (Late Jurassic, Kimmeridgian to Tithonian)	United States (Utah; Wyoming)	May have fed on tough vegetation as evidenced by extensive wear frequently exhibited on its teeth	
Caseosaurus	1998	Tecovas Formation (Late Triassic, Norian)	United States (Texas)	Possibly synonymous with Chindesaurus	
Cedarosaurus	1999	Cedar Mountain Formation (Early Cretaceous, Valanginian)	United States (Utah)	One specimen preserves over a hundred gastroliths	
Cedarpelta	2001	Cedar Mountain Formation (Late Cretaceous, Cenomanian to Turonian)	United States (Utah)	Lacked the extensive cranial ornamentation of later ankylosaurids	
Cedrorestes	2007	Cedar Mountain Formation (Early Cretaceous, Valanginian)	United States (Utah)	Known from a partial skeleton. The specific name, crichtoni, honors Michael Crichton, author of Jurassic Park and The Lost World	
Centrosaurus	1904	Dinosaur Park Formation (Late Cretaceous, Campanian)	Canada (Alberta)	Hundreds of individuals have been preserved in a single "mega-bonebed"	
Cerasinops	2007	Two Medicine Formation (Late Cretaceous, Campanian)	United States (Montana)	Combines features of both Asian and North American basal ceratopsians	
Ceratops	1888	Judith River Formation (Late Cretaceous, Campanian)	United States (Montana)	Although only known from a few bones, this genus is the namesake of the Ceratopsia and the Ceratopsidae	
Ceratosaurus	1884	Morrison Formation (Late Jurassic, Kimmeridgian to Tithonian)	United States (Colorado; Utah; Wyoming)	Possessed a row of osteoderms running down its back	
Chasmosaurus	1914	Dinosaur Park Formation (Late Cretaceous, Campanian)	Canada (Alberta)	Known from multiple remains, including various skulls, though most may not belong to this genus	
Chindesaurus	1995	Chinle Formation (Late Triassic, Norian)	United States (Arizona)	May be a herrerasaur or a close relative of Tawa	
Chirostenotes	1924	Dinosaur Park Formation (Late Cretaceous, Campanian)	Canada (Alberta)	Originally known only from isolated body parts	
Cionodon	1874	Denver Formation, Judith River Formation (Late Cretaceous, Campanian to Maastrichtian)	Canada (Alberta); United States (Colorado)	Poorly known	
Citipes	2020	Dinosaur Park Formation (Late Cretaceous, Campanian)	Canada (Alberta)	Some specimens were found as stomach contents of Gorgosaurus	
Claosaurus	1890	Niobrara Formation (Late Cretaceous, Santonian to Campanian)	United States (Kansas)	Historically conflated with other hadrosaurs	
Coahuilaceratops	2010	Cerro Huerta Formation (Late Cretaceous, Maastrichtian)	Mexico (Coahuila)	Possessed brow horns comparable in size to those of Triceratops and Torosaurus	
Coahuilasaurus	2024	Cerro del Pueblo Formation (Late Cretaceous, Campanian)	Mexico (Coahuila)	Identified as a specimen of Kritosaurus before receiving its own genus name	
Coelophysis	1889	Chinle Formation (Late Triassic, Norian)	United States (Arizona; New Mexico)	Known from over a thousand specimens, making it one of the most well-known early dinosaurs. Some referred species may belong to their own genera	
Coelurus	1879	Morrison Formation (Late Jurassic, Kimmeridgian)	United States (Wyoming)	Potentially an early member of the tyrannosauroid lineage	
Colepiocephale	2003	Foremost Formation (Late Cretaceous, Campanian)	Canada (Alberta)	Originally described as a species of Stegoceras	
Convolosaurus	2019	Twin Mountains Formation (Early Cretaceous, Aptian)	United States (Texas)	Before its formal description, it had been informally referred to as the "Proctor Lake hypsilophodontid"	
Coronosaurus	2012	Oldman Formation (Late Cretaceous, Campanian)	Canada (Alberta)	Had irregular masses of small spikes on the very top of its frill	
Corythosaurus	1914	Dinosaur Park Formation, Oldman Formation (Late Cretaceous, Campanian)	Canada (Alberta)	Possessed a semicircular crest which may have been used for vocalization	
Crittendenceratops	2018	Fort Crittenden Formation (Late Cretaceous, Campanian)	United States (Arizona)	The youngest known member of the Nasutoceratopsini	
Cryptarcus	2026	Dinosaur Park Formation (Late Cretaceous, Campanian)	Canada (Alberta)	Originally described as a second species of Chasmosaurus	
Daemonosaurus	2011	Chinle Formation (Late Triassic, Norian to Rhaetian?)	United States (New Mexico)	Unique among early dinosaurs for possessing a short snout with long teeth	
Dakotadon	2008	Lakota Formation (Early Cretaceous, Valanginian to Barremian)	United States (South Dakota)	Originally named as a species of Iguanodon	
Dakotaraptor	2015	Hell Creek Formation (Late Cretaceous, Maastrichtian)	United States (South Dakota)	The holotype assemblage may represent a chimera of multiple taxa	
Daspletosaurus	1970	Dinosaur Park Formation, Judith River Formation, Oldman Formation, Two Medicine Formation (Late Cretaceous, Campanian)	Canada (Alberta); United States (Montana)	At least three species are known. These have been interpreted as forming an anagenetic lineage but this hypothesis has been criticized	
Deinonychus	1969	Antlers Formation, Arundel Formation?, Cedar Mountain Formation?, Cloverly Formation (Early Cretaceous to Late Cretaceous, Aptian to Cenomanian)	United States (Maryland? Montana; Oklahoma; Utah? Wyoming)	Its discovery helped researchers realize that dinosaurs were active, warm-blooded animals, kicking off the dinosaur renaissance	
Denversaurus	1988	Hell Creek Formation, Lance Formation (Late Cretaceous, Maastrichtian)	United States (South Dakota; Wyoming)	The youngest known nodosaurid	
Diabloceratops	2010	Wahweap Formation (Late Cretaceous, Campanian)	United States (Utah)	Had a distinctively short, deep skull	
Diclonius	1876	Judith River Formation (Late Cretaceous, Campanian)	United States (Montana)	Replaced its teeth in such a way that new teeth could be used at the same time as older ones	
Dilophosaurus	1970	Kayenta Formation (Early Jurassic, Sinemurian to Toarcian)	United States (Arizona)	Possessed two semicircular crests running along the length of the skull	
Dineobellator	2020	Ojo Alamo Formation (Late Cretaceous, Maastrichtian)	United States (New Mexico)	Several features of its hands and feet may be adaptations for increased grip strength	
Dinevenator	2026	Kirtland Formation (Late Cretaceous, Campanian)	United States (New Mexico)	Originally assigned to the genera Saurornitholestes and Xenovenator	
Diplodocus	1878	Morrison Formation (Late Jurassic, Kimmeridgian to Tithonian?)	United States (Colorado; Montana; New Mexico; Utah; Wyoming)	Had a long, thin tail popularly thought to have been used like a bullwhip but it is possible that it could not handle the stress of supersonic travel	
Diplotomodon	1868	Hornerstown Formation?/Navesink Formation? (Late Cretaceous, Maastrichtian)	United States (New Jersey)	Has been suggested to be non-dinosaurian	
Dromaeosaurus	1922	Dinosaur Park Formation, Hell Creek Formation?, Horseshoe Canyon Formation?, Prince Creek Formation? (Late Cretaceous, Campanian to Maastrichtian?)	Canada (Alberta); United States (Alaska? South Dakota?)	Analysis of wear on its teeth suggests it preferred tougher prey, including bone	
Dromiceiomimus	1972	Horseshoe Canyon Formation (Late Cretaceous, Maastrichtian)	Canada (Alberta)	May be synonymous with Ornithomimus edmontonicus	
Dryosaurus	1894	Morrison Formation (Late Jurassic, Kimmeridgian to Tithonian)	United States (Colorado; Utah; Wyoming)	Remains of multiple growth stages have been found, including specimens in embryonic age	
Dryptosaurus	1877	Navesink Formation?, New Egypt Formation (Late Cretaceous, Maastrichtian)	United States (New Jersey)	Its discovery showed that theropods were bipedal animals	
Dynamoterror	2018	Menefee Formation (Late Cretaceous, Campanian)	United States (New Mexico)	Part of the Teratophoneini, a clade of tyrannosaurids exclusively known from southwestern North America	
Dyoplosaurus	1924	Dinosaur Park Formation (Late Cretaceous, Campanian)	Canada (Alberta)	The holotype specimen preserves skin impressions	
Dysganus	1876	Judith River Formation (Late Cretaceous, Campanian)	United States (Montana)	Four species have been named, all from isolated teeth	
Dyslocosaurus	1992	Lance Formation?/Morrison Formation? (Late Jurassic, Kimmeridgian?/Late Cretaceous, Maastrichtian?)	United States (Wyoming)	Has been suggested to have four claws on its hindlimbs	
Dystrophaeus	1877	Morrison Formation (Late Jurassic, Oxfordian)	United States (Utah)	Inconsistent in phylogenetic placement, although undescribed remains could further clarify its relationships	
Edmontonia	1928	Dinosaur Park Formation, Horseshoe Canyon Formation, Judith River Formation? (Late Cretaceous, Campanian to Maastrichtian)	Canada (Alberta); United States (Montana?)	Possessed forward-pointing, bifurcated spikes on its shoulders	
Edmontosaurus	1917	Frenchman Formation, Hell Creek Formation, Horseshoe Canyon Formation, Lance Formation, Prince Creek Formation (Late Cretaceous, Campanian to Maastrichtian)	Canada (Alberta; Saskatchewan); United States (Alaska; Colorado; Montana; North Dakota; South Dakota; Wyoming)	Known from multiple well-preserved specimens, including a few "mummies". Several were originally assigned to their own genera and/or species	
Einiosaurus	1994	Two Medicine Formation (Late Cretaceous, Campanian)	United States (Montana)	Distinguished by its forward-curving nasal horn	
Enigmacursor	2025	Morrison Formation (Late Jurassic, Kimmeridgian to Tithonian)	United States (Colorado)	Known from a three-dimensionally preserved skeleton	
Eolambia	1998	Cedar Mountain Formation (Late Cretaceous, Cenomanian)	United States (Utah)	Remains of multiple individuals are known, making up much of the skeleton	
Eoneophron	2024	Hell Creek Formation (Late Cretaceous, Maastrichtian)	United States (South Dakota)	Smaller than the contemporary Anzu	
Eotrachodon	2016	Mooreville Chalk (Late Cretaceous, Santonian)	United States (Alabama)	Had a saurolophine-like skull despite its basal position	
Eotriceratops	2007	Horseshoe Canyon Formation (Late Cretaceous, Maastrichtian)	Canada (Alberta)	May have been the largest known ceratopsid	
Epichirostenotes	2011	Horseshoe Canyon Formation (Late Cretaceous, Maastrichtian)	Canada (Alberta)	Its discovery allowed researchers to connect isolated caenagnathid body parts to each other	
Euoplocephalus	1910	Dinosaur Park Formation (Late Cretaceous, Campanian)	Canada (Alberta)	Unusually, its palpebral bone was mobile, allowing it to be used as an eyelid	
Falcarius	2005	Cedar Mountain Formation (Early Cretaceous, Valanginian)	United States (Utah)	Transitional between generalized theropods and specialized therizinosaurs	
Ferrisaurus	2019	Tango Creek Formation (Late Cretaceous, Maastrichtian)	Canada (British Columbia)	Its holotype was discovered close to a railway line	
Fona	2024	Cedar Mountain Formation (Late Cretaceous, Cenomanian)	United States (Utah)	Possibly a semi-fossorial animal based on the related Oryctodromeus	
Foraminacephale	2016	Dinosaur Park Formation, Oldman Formation (Late Cretaceous, Campanian)	Canada (Alberta)	Originally assigned to three different pachycephalosaurid genera	
Fosterovenator	2014	Morrison Formation (Late Jurassic, Kimmeridgian to Tithonian)	United States (Wyoming)	Has been variously described as a ceratosaurid, a tetanuran or a close relative of Elaphrosaurus	
Fruitadens	2010	Morrison Formation (Late Jurassic, Tithonian)	United States (Colorado)	One of the smallest known ornithischians	
Furcatoceratops	2023	Judith River Formation (Late Cretaceous, Campanian)	United States (Montana)	Preserves most of the postcranial skeleton, a rarity for ceratopsids. Remains originally identified as Avaceratops	
Galeamopus	2015	Morrison Formation (Late Jurassic, Kimmeridgian)	United States (Colorado; Wyoming)	One specimen is nearly complete, even preserving an associated skull	
Gargoyleosaurus	1998	Morrison Formation (Late Jurassic, Kimmeridgian to Tithonian)	United States (Wyoming)	Combines features of both ankylosaurids and nodosaurids	
Gastonia	1998	Cedar Mountain Formation (Early Cretaceous, Valanginian to Barremian)	United States (Utah)	Several concentrations of fossils may suggest this taxon lived in herds	←
Glishades	2010	Two Medicine Formation (Late Cretaceous, Campanian)	United States (Montana)	Described as a basal hadrosauroid but may in fact be a juvenile saurolophine hadrosaurid	
Glyptodontopelta	2000	Ojo Alamo Formation (Late Cretaceous, Maastrichtian)	United States (New Mexico)	Originally interpreted as possessing a flat mosaic of osteoderms similar to the shields of glyptodonts	
Gojirasaurus	1997	Bull Canyon Formation (Late Triassic, Norian)	United States (New Mexico)	May be a chimera consisting of undiagnostic theropod bones mixed with pseudosuchian vertebrae	
Gorgosaurus	1914	Dinosaur Park Formation, Judith River Formation?, Two Medicine Formation?, Wapiti Formation (Late Cretaceous, Campanian)	Canada (Alberta); United States (Montana?)	Dozens of specimens are known	
Gremlin	2023	Oldman Formation (Late Cretaceous, Campanian)	Canada (Alberta)	Possessed a ridge running along the top of the skull	
Gryphoceratops	2012	Milk River Formation (Late Cretaceous, Santonian)	Canada (Alberta)	Potentially the smallest adult ceratopsian known from North America	
Gryposaurus	1914	Bearpaw Formation?, Dinosaur Park Formation, Javelina Formation?, Kaiparowits Formation, Two Medicine Formation (Late Cretaceous, Santonian to Maastrichtian?)	Canada (Alberta); United States (Montana; Texas? Utah)	One specimen preserves impressions of a row of pyramidal scales running along its back	
Hadrosaurus	1858	Woodbury Formation (Late Cretaceous, Campanian)	United States (New Jersey)	Its holotype was the first dinosaur skeleton to be mounted	
Hagryphus	2005	Kaiparowits Formation (Late Cretaceous, Campanian)	United States (Utah)	Large but only known from a single hand	
Haplocanthosaurus	1903	Morrison Formation (Late Jurassic, Kimmeridgian)	United States (Colorado; Montana? Wyoming)	One of the smallest sauropods of the Morrison Formation	
Hesperonychus	2009	Dinosaur Park Formation, Oldman Formation? (Late Cretaceous, Campanian)	Canada (Alberta)	A common component of its habitat as indicated by the great number of its remains	
Hesperornithoides	2019	Morrison Formation (Late Jurassic, Oxfordian to Tithonian)	United States (Wyoming)	Before its formal description, it had been nicknamed "Lori"	
Hesperosaurus	2001	Morrison Formation (Late Jurassic, Kimmeridgian)	United States (Montana; Wyoming)	Two morphotypes of plates are known, which has been interpreted as an indication of sexual dimorphism	
Hierosaurus	1909	Niobrara Formation (Late Cretaceous, Coniacian to Campanian)	United States (Kansas)	Only known from a few bones, including osteoderms	
Hippodraco	2010	Cedar Mountain Formation (Early Cretaceous, Valanginian)	United States (Utah)	Its tooth crowns were shaped like shields	
Hoplitosaurus	1902	Lakota Formation (Early Cretaceous, Barremian?)	United States (South Dakota)	Known from some osteoderms, including spikes similar to those of Polacanthus	
Huehuecanauhtlus	2012	Unnamed formation (Late Cretaceous, Santonian)	Mexico (Michoacán)	The southernmost non-hadrosaurid hadrosauroid known from North America	
Hypacrosaurus	1913	Horseshoe Canyon Formation, Two Medicine Formation (Late Cretaceous, Campanian to Maastrichtian)	Canada (Alberta); United States (Montana)	Some juveniles of this genus were originally interpreted as dwarf lambeosaurines	
Hypsibema	1869	Marshalltown Formation?, Ripley Formation, Tar Heel/Coachman Formation (Late Cretaceous, Campanian)	United States (Missouri; New Jersey? North Carolina)	Potentially one of the largest non-hadrosaurid hadrosauroids	
Hypsirophus	1878	Morrison Formation (Late Jurassic, Tithonian)	United States (Colorado)	Usually seen as synonymous with Stegosaurus but may be a separate genus due to differences in its vertebrae	
Iani	2023	Cedar Mountain Formation (Late Cretaceous, Cenomanian)	United States (Utah)	Represents the family Tenontosauridae, a clade of North American rhabdodontomorphs	
Iguanacolossus	2010	Cedar Mountain Formation (Early Cretaceous, Valanginian)	United States (Utah)	Large and robustly built	
Infernogallus	2026	Hell Creek Formation (Late Cretaceous, Maastrichtian)	United States (Montana; North Dakota; South Dakota)	Uniquely, its jaw muscles show an adaptation to a frugivorous diet	
Invictarx	2018	Menefee Formation (Late Cretaceous, Campanian)	United States (New Mexico)	Only known from a few bones but can be distinguished from other genera by characters of its osteoderms	
Issi	2021	Fleming Fjord Formation (Late Triassic, Norian)	Greenland (Sermersooq)	Originally described as an exemplar of Plateosaurus	
Jeyawati	2010	Moreno Hill Formation (Late Cretaceous, Turonian to Coniacian)	United States (New Mexico)	Its postorbital bone had a rugose texture	
Judiceratops	2013	Judith River Formation (Late Cretaceous, Campanian)	United States (Montana)	Unusually, its brow horns were teardrop-shaped in cross-section	
Kaatedocus	2012	Morrison Formation (Late Jurassic, Kimmeridgian)	United States (Wyoming)	Originally interpreted as a diplodocid although one study finds it to be more likely a basal dicraeosaurid	
Kayentavenator	2010	Kayenta Formation (Early Jurassic, Sinemurian to Pliensbachian)	United States (Arizona)	Described in a book published through an online print-on-demand service	
Koparion	1994	Morrison Formation (Late Jurassic, Kimmeridgian)	United States (Utah)	Known from a single tooth which may have come from a troodontid	
Kosmoceratops	2010	Kaiparowits Formation (Late Cretaceous, Campanian)	United States (Utah)	Possessed fifteen horns and horn-like structures, including eight hornlets folding down from the top of the frill	
Kritosaurus	1910	El Picacho Formation?, Javelina Formation?, Kirtland Formation, Ojo Alamo Formation? (Late Cretaceous, Campanian to Maastrichtian?)	United States (New Mexico; Texas?)	Had an elevated nasal bone with an enlarged nasal cavity to match	
Labocania	1974	Cerro del Pueblo Formation, La Bocana Roja Formation (Late Cretaceous, Cenomanian? to Campanian)	Mexico (Baja California; Coahuila)	The description of the second species, L. aguillonae, suggests a position within the tyrannosaurid clade Teratophoneini	
Lambeosaurus	1923	Dinosaur Park Formation (Late Cretaceous, Campanian)	Canada (Alberta)	Possessed a hollow head crest that varied in shape between species, sexes and ages. Most familiarly, it was hatchet-shaped in adult male L. lambei	
Laosaurus	1878	Morrison Formation (Late Jurassic, Oxfordian to Tithonian)	United States (Wyoming)	Several referred specimens have been reassigned to other taxa	
Latirhinus	2012	Cerro del Pueblo Formation (Late Cretaceous, Campanian)	Mexico (Coahuila)	As described, it represented a chimera composed of lambeosaurine and saurolophine remains. The exact holotypic bones belonged to a lambeosaurine	
Lepidus	2015	Colorado City Formation (Late Triassic, Norian)	United States (Texas)	Muscle scars are preserved on the holotype bones	
Leptoceratops	1914	Hell Creek Formation, Lance Formation, Scollard Formation (Late Cretaceous, Maastrichtian)	Canada (Alberta); United States (Montana; Wyoming)	Analysis of its teeth shows it could chew like a mammal, an adaptation to eating tough, fibrous plants	
Leptorhynchos	2013	Aguja Formation (Late Cretaceous, Campanian)	United States (Texas)	Had a slightly upturned mandible similar to those of oviraptorids	
Lokiceratops	2024	Judith River Formation (Late Cretaceous, Campanian)	United States (Montana)	Unusually for a ceratopsid, its frill ornamentations were bilaterally asymmetrical. Closely related to Albertaceratops and Medusaceratops	
Lophorhothon	1960	Mooreville Chalk, Tar Heel/Coachman Formation? (Late Cretaceous, Campanian)	United States (Alabama; North Carolina?)	Although incomplete, the holotype skull preserves evidence of a crest	
Lythronax	2013	Wahweap Formation (Late Cretaceous, Campanian)	United States (Utah)	Already had the forward-directed orbits of derived tyrannosaurids despite its early age	
Machairoceratops	2016	Wahweap Formation (Late Cretaceous, Campanian)	United States (Utah)	Possessed two long, forward-pointing horns on the top of its frill	
Magnapaulia	2012	El Gallo Formation (Late Cretaceous, Campanian)	Mexico (Baja California)	Has been suggested to be semi-aquatic due to its tall, narrow tail	
Maiasaura	1979	Oldman Formation, Two Medicine Formation (Late Cretaceous, Campanian)	Canada (Alberta); United States (Montana)	Remains of hundreds of individuals, including juveniles, eggs and nests, have been found at a single site	
Malefica	2022	Aguja Formation (Late Cretaceous, Campanian)	United States (Texas)	Its discovery suggests a greater diversity of basal hadrosaurids than previously thought	
Maraapunisaurus	2018	Morrison Formation (Late Jurassic, Kimmeridgian)	United States (Colorado)	Named from a single, lost vertebra of immense size	
Marshosaurus	1976	Morrison Formation (Late Jurassic, Kimmeridgian)	United States (Colorado? Utah)	Potentially a close relative of Piatnitzkysaurus and Condorraptor	
Martharaptor	2012	Cedar Mountain Formation (Early Cretaceous, Valanginian)	United States (Utah)	Had not yet acquired the robust feet of derived therizinosaurs	
Medusaceratops	2010	Judith River Formation (Late Cretaceous, Campanian)	United States (Montana)	Possessed elongated spikes curving away from the sides of its frill	
Menefeeceratops	2021	Menefee Formation (Late Cretaceous, Campanian)	United States (New Mexico)	One of the oldest centrosaurines	
Mercuriceratops	2014	Dinosaur Park Formation, Judith River Formation (Late Cretaceous, Campanian)	Canada (Alberta); United States (Montana)	Had "wing"-like projections on its squamosal bones	
Mexidracon	2025	Cerro del Pueblo Formation (Late Cretaceous, Campanian)	Mexico (Coahuila)	Had unusually long hands for an ornithomimosaur	
Microvenator	1970	Cloverly Formation (Early Cretaceous, Albian)	United States (Montana)	Teeth from Deinonychus have been mistakenly attributed to this genus	
Mierasaurus	2017	Cedar Mountain Formation (Early Cretaceous, Valanginian)	United States (Utah)	One of the latest-surviving turiasaurs	
Moabosaurus	2017	Cedar Mountain Formation (Early Cretaceous, Aptian)	United States (Utah)	Described as a macronarian but has since been reinterpreted as a turiasaur closely related to Mierasaurus	
Monoclonius	1876	Dinosaur Park Formation, Judith River Formation (Late Cretaceous, Campanian)	Canada (Alberta); United States (Montana)	Only known from indistinct remains of juveniles and subadults	
Montanoceratops	1951	Horseshoe Canyon Formation?, St. Mary River Formation (Late Cretaceous, Maastrichtian)	Canada (Alberta); United States (Montana)	Often restored with a short nasal horn although this may be a misplaced cheek horn	
Moros	2019	Cedar Mountain Formation (Late Cretaceous, Cenomanian)	United States (Utah)	The proportions of its metatarsals are similar to those of ornithomimids	
Mymoorapelta	1994	Morrison Formation (Late Jurassic, Kimmeridgian to Tithonian)	United States (Colorado; Utah)	The first ankylosaur described from the Morrison Formation	
Naashoibitosaurus	1993	Kirtland Formation (Late Cretaceous, Campanian)	United States (New Mexico)	Like other kritosaurins, it possessed a nasal arch, but it was not as tall as that of Gryposaurus	
Nanosaurus	1877	Morrison Formation (Late Jurassic, Kimmeridgian to Tithonian)	United States (Colorado; Wyoming)	Several referred specimens were originally assigned to other genera	
Nanotyrannus	1988	Hell Creek Formation (Late Cretaceous, Maastrichtian)	United States (Montana)	Remains referred to this genus have been historically believed to be juvenile Tyrannosaurus specimens, but its validity was later affirmed in 2025	
Nanuqsaurus	2014	Prince Creek Formation (Late Cretaceous, Maastrichtian)	United States (Alaska)	Described as a dwarf tyrannosaurid although undescribed remains suggest a size comparable to Albertosaurus	
Nasutoceratops	2013	Kaiparowits Formation (Late Cretaceous, Campanian)	United States (Utah)	Possessed an enlarged nasal cavity and two long, curving horns similar to those of modern cattle	
Navajoceratops	2020	Kirtland Formation (Late Cretaceous, Campanian)	United States (New Mexico)	Had a distinctive notch at the very top of its frill, similar to its potential ancestor Pentaceratops	
Nedcolbertia	1998	Cedar Mountain Formation (Early Cretaceous, Valanginian)	United States (Utah)	Known from three partial skeletons. The specific name, justinhofmanni, honors a six-year-old schoolboy who won a contest to have a dinosaur named after him	
Nevadadromeus	2022	Willow Tank Formation (Late Cretaceous, Cenomanian)	United States (Nevada)	The first non-avian dinosaur described from Nevada	
Niobrarasaurus	1995	Niobrara Formation (Late Cretaceous, Coniacian to Campanian)	United States (Kansas)	Originally mistakenly believed to have been aquatic	
Nodocephalosaurus	1999	Kirtland Formation (Late Cretaceous, Campanian)	United States (New Mexico)	Closely related to Asian ankylosaurids	
Nodosaurus	1889	Frontier Formation (Late Cretaceous, Cenomanian to Coniacian)	United States (Wyoming)	Its armor included banded dermal plates interspersed by bony nodules	
Nothronychus	2001	Moreno Hill Formation, Tropic Shale (Late Cretaceous, Turonian)	United States (New Mexico; Utah)	Would have lived in the marshes and swamps along the Turonian shoreline	
Ojoraptorsaurus	2011	Ojo Alamo Formation (Late Cretaceous, Maastrichtian)	United States (New Mexico)	Only known from an incomplete pair of pubes	
Oohkotokia	2013	Two Medicine Formation (Late Cretaceous, Campanian)	United States (Montana)	Potentially a synonym of Scolosaurus	
Ornatops	2021	Menefee Formation (Late Cretaceous, Campanian)	United States (New Mexico)	Preserves a pair of bumps on its skull which may have anchored a crest	
Ornitholestes	1903	Morrison Formation (Late Jurassic, Kimmeridgian)	United States (Wyoming)	May have possessed a sickle claw similar to those of dromaeosaurids	
Ornithomimus	1890	Denver Formation, Dinosaur Park Formation, Ferris Formation?, Horseshoe Canyon Formation, Kaiparowits Formation? (Late Cretaceous, Campanian to Maastrichtian)	Canada (Alberta); United States (Colorado; Utah? Wyoming)	One referred specimen preserves impressions of ostrich-like feathers covering most of its body	
Orodromeus	1988	Two Medicine Formation (Late Cretaceous, Campanian)	United States (Montana)	Eggs considered to belong to this taxon may have actually come from a troodontid	
Oryctodromeus	2007	Blackleaf Formation, Wayan Formation (Late Cretaceous, Cenomanian)	United States (Idaho; Montana)	Several specimens have been preserved in burrows	
Osmakasaurus	2011	Lakota Formation (Early Cretaceous, Valanginian)	United States (South Dakota)	Originally named as a species of Camptosaurus	
Pachycephalosaurus	1943	Hell Creek Formation, Lance Formation, Scollard Formation? (Late Cretaceous, Maastrichtian)	Canada (Alberta?); United States (Montana; South Dakota; Wyoming)	Possessed a tall, rounded head dome surrounded by bony knobs	
Pachyrhinosaurus	1950	Horseshoe Canyon Formation, Prince Creek Formation, St. Mary River Formation, Wapiti Formation (Late Cretaceous, Campanian to Maastrichtian)	Canada (Alberta); United States (Alaska)	Three species have been named, each with a unique pattern of cranial ornamentation	
Palaeoscincus	1856	Judith River Formation (Late Cretaceous, Campanian)	United States (Montana)	Although many restorations depict it with the spikes of Edmontonia and the tail club of Ankylosaurus, this is most likely incorrect	
Panoplosaurus	1919	Dinosaur Park Formation (Late Cretaceous, Campanian)	Canada (Alberta)	Unlike other nodosaurids, it lacked enlarged spikes	
Parasaurolophus	1922	Dinosaur Park Formation, Fruitland Formation, Kaiparowits Formation, Kirtland Formation (Late Cretaceous, Campanian)	Canada (Alberta); United States (New Mexico; Utah)	Possessed a curved, hollow crest that varied in size between species	
Paraxenisaurus	2020	Cerro del Pueblo Formation (Late Cretaceous, Campanian)	Mexico (Coahuila)	Described as the first deinocheirid from North America	
Parksosaurus	1937	Horseshoe Canyon Formation (Late Cretaceous, Maastrichtian)	Canada (Alberta)	Had long toes which may be an adaptation to walking on soft soils in watercourses and marshlands	
Paronychodon	1876	Hell Creek Formation, Judith River Formation, Lance Formation (Late Cretaceous, Campanian to Maastrichtian)	United States (Montana; North Dakota; South Dakota; Wyoming)	Only known from highly distinctive teeth	
Pawpawsaurus	1996	Paw Paw Formation (Early Cretaceous, Albian)	United States (Texas)	Had enlarged nasal cavities that gave it an acute sense of smell, even more powerful than that of contemporary theropods	
Pectinodon	1982	Hell Creek Formation, Lance Formation (Late Cretaceous, Maastrichtian)	United States (Wyoming)	Had comb-like serrations on its teeth	
Peloroplites	2008	Cedar Mountain Formation (Late Cretaceous, Cenomanian to Turonian)	United States (Utah)	One of the largest known nodosaurids	
Pentaceratops	1923	Fruitland Formation, Kirtland Formation (Late Cretaceous, Campanian)	United States (New Mexico)	Its epijugal bones, the hornlets under its eyes, were relatively large	
Planicoxa	2001	Cedar Mountain Formation (Early Cretaceous, Barremian to Albian)	United States (Utah)	The rear of its ilium was characteristically flat	
Platypelta	2018	Dinosaur Park Formation (Late Cretaceous, Campanian)	Canada (Alberta)	Originally assigned to Euoplocephalus but was given its own genus because of several morphological differences	
Platytholus	2023	Hell Creek Formation (Late Cretaceous, Maastrichtian)	United States (Montana)	Differs from juveniles of the contemporary Pachycephalosaurus and Sphaerotholus, hence its classification as a new genus	
Plesiolophus	2026	Oldman Formation (Late Cretaceous, Campanian)	Canada (Alberta)	Its skull has more primitive features compared to its closest relatives	
Podokesaurus	1911	Portland Formation (Early Jurassic, Hettangian to Sinemurian)	United States (Massachusetts)	May have had a tail one and a half times longer than the rest of its skeleton	
Polyodontosaurus	1932	Dinosaur Park Formation (Late Cretaceous, Campanian)	Canada (Alberta)	May be identical to Latenivenatrix	
Polyonax	1874	Denver Formation (Late Cretaceous, Maastrichtian)	United States (Colorado)	Poorly known	
Prenoceratops	2004	Oldman Formation, Two Medicine Formation (Late Cretaceous, Campanian)	Canada (Alberta); United States (Montana)	The only basal neoceratopsian known from a bonebed	
Priconodon	1888	Arundel Formation (Early Cretaceous, Aptian to Albian)	United States (Maryland)	Large but only known from teeth	
Probrachylophosaurus	2015	Foremost Formation, Judith River Formation (Late Cretaceous, Campanian)	Canada (Alberta); United States (Montana)	Shows a skull morphology transitional between crestless and crested brachylophosaurins	
Propanoplosaurus	2011	Patuxent Formation (Early Cretaceous, Aptian)	United States (Maryland)	Only known from the imprints of a neonate skeleton	
Prosaurolophus	1916	Dinosaur Park Formation, Two Medicine Formation (Late Cretaceous, Campanian)	Canada (Alberta); United States (Montana)	Had a relatively large head for a hadrosaur	
Protohadros	1998	Woodbine Formation (Late Cretaceous, Cenomanian)	United States (Texas)	Possessed a downturned jaw which may be an adaptation to grazing on low-growing plants	
Pteropelyx	1889	Judith River Formation (Late Cretaceous, Campanian)	United States (Montana)	Potentially synonymous with Corythosaurus, although this cannot be confirmed due to the lack of cranial remains	
Ptychotherates	2026	Chinle Formation (Late Triassic, Norian to Rhaetian)	United States (New Mexico)	Had the proportionately deepest jugal of any Triassic dinosaur	
Rativates	2016	Dinosaur Park Formation (Late Cretaceous, Campanian)	Canada (Alberta)	Originally described as a specimen of Struthiomimus	
Regaliceratops	2015	St. Mary River Formation (Late Cretaceous, Maastrichtian)	Canada (Alberta)	Possessed a series of large, pentagonal plates lining its frill	
Richardoestesia	1990	Aguja Formation, Dinosaur Park Formation, Ferris Formation?, Hell Creek Formation?, Horseshoe Canyon Formation?, Lance Formation?, Scollard Formation? (Late Cretaceous, Campanian to Maastrichtian?)	Canada (Alberta); United States (Montana? Texas; Wyoming?)	Teeth assigned to this genus have been recovered all around the world, in deposits spanning from the Jurassic to the Cretaceous, although they may not represent a single taxon	
Rugocaudia	2012	Cloverly Formation (Early Cretaceous, Aptian to Albian)	United States (Montana)	Some of this genus' remains include several caudal vertebrae	
Sarahsaurus	2011	Kayenta Formation (Early Jurassic, Sinemurian to Pliensbachian)	United States (Arizona)	Possessed strong hands which may indicate a feeding specialization	
Saurolophus	1912	Horseshoe Canyon Formation (Late Cretaceous, Maastrichtian)	Canada (Alberta)	Had a short, solid crest that pointed directly upwards. A larger, more well-known species has been found in Mongolia	
Sauropelta	1970	Cedar Mountain Formation?, Cloverly Formation (Early Cretaceous, Albian)	United States (Montana; Utah? Wyoming)	Its tail had at least forty vertebrae, making up half of its total body length	
Saurophaganax	1995	Morrison Formation (Late Jurassic, Kimmeridgian)	United States (New Mexico? Oklahoma)	Originally described as a large theropod, but was later suggested to be a chimera of sauropod and theropod bones. The holotype bone may have belonged to a sauropod	
Sauroposeidon	2000	Antlers Formation, Cloverly Formation, Glen Rose Formation, Twin Mountains Formation (Early Cretaceous, Aptian to Albian)	United States (Oklahoma; Texas; Wyoming)	Could raise its head up to 18 metres (59 ft) in the air, the height of a six-story building	
Saurornitholestes	1978	Dinosaur Park Formation, Donoho Creek Formation, Kirtland Formation, Mooreville Chalk, Oldman Formation, Tar Heel/Coachman Formation, Two Medicine Formation (Late Cretaceous, Campanian to Maastrichtian)	Canada (Alberta); United States (Alabama; Montana; New Mexico; South Carolina)	Its second premaxillary teeth could be adapted to preening feathers	
Scolosaurus	1928	Dinosaur Park Formation, Oldman Formation (Late Cretaceous, Campanian)	Canada (Alberta)	Once widely believed to be synonymous with other Campanian ankylosaurids	
Scutellosaurus	1981	Kayenta Formation (Early Jurassic, Sinemurian)	United States (Arizona)	Had hundreds of osteoderms arranged in rows along its back and tail	
Segisaurus	1936	Navajo Sandstone (Early Jurassic, Pliensbachian to Toarcian)	United States (Arizona)	Preserves evidence of a wishbone similar to that of modern birds	
Seitaad	2010	Navajo Sandstone (Early Jurassic, Pliensbachian)	United States (Utah)	The holotype may have died when a sand dune collapsed on it	
Siats	2013	Cedar Mountain Formation (Late Cretaceous, Cenomanian)	United States (Utah)	Large but inconsistent in phylogenetic placement	
Sierraceratops	2022	Hall Lake Formation (Late Cretaceous, Campanian to Maastrichtian)	United States (New Mexico)	May be part of a unique clade of chasmosaurine ceratopsids only known from southern Laramidia	
Silvisaurus	1960	Dakota Formation (Early Cretaceous to Late Cretaceous, Albian to Cenomanian)	United States (Kansas)	Hypothesized to live in a forested habitat	
Smitanosaurus	2020	Morrison Formation (Late Jurassic, Oxfordian to Tithonian)	United States (Colorado)	Only known from a partial skull and some vertebrae	
Sonorasaurus	1998	Turney Ranch Formation (Early Cretaceous to Late Cretaceous, Albian to Cenomanian)	United States (Arizona)	State dinosaur of Arizona	
Sphaerotholus	2002	Dinosaur Park Formation, Frenchman Formation, Hell Creek Formation, Horseshoe Canyon Formation, Kirtland Formation (Late Cretaceous, Campanian to Maastrichtian)	Canada (Alberta; Saskatchewan); United States (Montana; New Mexico)	Five species have been named, all known from skull elements. Lived in a broad range	
Spiclypeus	2016	Judith River Formation (Late Cretaceous, Campanian)	United States (Montana)	Has been described as "boldly audacious"	
Spinops	2011	Dinosaur Park Formation?/Oldman Formation? (Late Cretaceous, Campanian)	Canada (Alberta)	Described almost a century after its remains were collected	
Stegoceras	1902	Dinosaur Park Formation, Fruitland Formation?, Kirtland Formation?, Oldman Formation (Late Cretaceous, Campanian)	Canada (Alberta); United States (New Mexico?)	May have been an indiscriminate bulk-feeder due to the shape of its snout	
Stegopelta	1905	Frontier Formation (Early Cretaceous to Late Cretaceous, Albian to Cenomanian)	United States (Wyoming)	May have possessed a sacral shield similar to other nodosaurids	
Stegosaurus	1877	Morrison Formation (Late Jurassic, Kimmeridgian to Tithonian)	United States (Colorado; Wyoming)	Had a single alternating row of large, kite-shaped plates	
Stellasaurus	2020	Two Medicine Formation (Late Cretaceous, Campanian)	United States (Montana)	Possessed an enlarged, thickened nasal horn	
Stenonychosaurus	1932	Dinosaur Park Formation, Two Medicine Formation? (Late Cretaceous, Campanian)	Canada (Alberta); United States (Montana?)	Its brain-to-body mass ratio is one of the highest of any non-avian dinosaur. Possibly synonymous with Troodon	
Stephanosaurus	1914	Dinosaur Park Formation (Late Cretaceous, Campanian)	Canada (Alberta)	Poorly known	
Stokesosaurus	1974	Morrison Formation (Late Jurassic, Kimmeridgian? to Tithonian)	United States (South Dakota? Utah)	Only known from a few remains but they are enough to tell that it was a tyrannosauroid	
Struthiomimus	1917	Horseshoe Canyon Formation?, Lance Formation?, Oldman Formation (Late Cretaceous, Campanian to Maastrichtian?)	Canada (Alberta); United States (Wyoming?)	Known from many specimens, indicating it was a common animal	
Styracosaurus	1913	Dinosaur Park Formation, Two Medicine Formation? (Late Cretaceous, Campanian)	Canada (Alberta); United States (Montana?)	Possessed several long horns jutting out from the top of its frill, the patterns of which could have varied between individuals	
Supersaurus	1985	Morrison Formation (Late Jurassic, Tithonian)	United States (Colorado; Wyoming)	Several remains were originally believed to represent their own genera	
Suskityrannus	2019	Moreno Hill Formation (Late Cretaceous, Turonian)	United States (New Mexico)	Small yet already possessed several features of larger, more derived tyrannosaurids, including an arctometatarsus	
Suuwassea	2004	Morrison Formation (Late Jurassic, Oxfordian to Tithonian)	United States (Montana)	Shares features with both diplodocids and dicraeosaurids, but is most likely a member of the latter group	
Talos	2011	Kaiparowits Formation (Late Cretaceous, Campanian)	United States (Utah)	The holotype specimen preserves a pathology on its sickle claw	
Tanycolagreus	2005	Morrison Formation (Late Jurassic, Kimmeridgian to Tithonian)	United States (Colorado; Utah; Wyoming)	Had a long, blunt snout	
Tatankacephalus	2009	Cloverly Formation (Early Cretaceous, Aptian to Albian)	United States (Montana)	Retained premaxillary teeth in its upper jaws, a basal trait	
Tawa	2009	Chinle Formation (Late Triassic, Norian)	United States (New Mexico)	Well-preserved but inconsistent in phylogenetic placement	
Tenontosaurus	1970	Antlers Formation, Arundel Formation, Cedar Mountain Formation, Cloverly Formation, Paluxy Formation, Twin Mountains Formation, Wayan Formation (Early Cretaceous, Aptian to Albian)	United States (Idaho; Maryland; Montana; Oklahoma; Texas; Utah)	Remains of this genus are often found associated with skeletons of Deinonychus	
Teratophoneus	2011	Kaiparowits Formation (Late Cretaceous, Campanian)	United States (Utah)	Its snout was shorter and deeper than those of other tyrannosaurids	
Terminocavus	2020	Kirtland Formation (Late Cretaceous, Campanian)	United States (New Mexico)	Had a teardrop-shaped hole on the top of its frill which was almost closed off by a pair of epoccipitals	
Texacephale	2010	Aguja Formation (Late Cretaceous, Campanian)	United States (Texas)	Might represent a specimen of Stegoceras	
Texasetes	1995	Paw Paw Formation (Early Cretaceous, Albian)	United States (Texas)	Potentially synonymous with Pawpawsaurus	
Thanatotheristes	2020	Foremost Formation (Late Cretaceous, Campanian)	Canada (Alberta)	A close relative of Daspletosaurus	
Theiophytalia	2006	Purgatoire Formation (Early Cretaceous, Aptian to Albian)	United States (Colorado)	Only known from a skull originally referred to Camptosaurus	
Thescelosaurus	1913	Frenchman Formation, Hell Creek Formation, Lance Formation, Laramie Formation, Scollard Formation (Late Cretaceous, Maastrichtian)	Canada (Alberta; Saskatchewan); United States (Colorado; Montana; North Dakota; South Dakota; Wyoming)	One specimen was originally considered to have preserved its heart, although this was later found to be a mineral concretion	
Thespesius	1856	Lance Formation (Late Cretaceous, Maastrichtian)	United States (South Dakota)	Once suggested to be a possible Miocene mammal	
Tichosteus	1877	Morrison Formation (Late Jurassic, Kimmeridgian)	United States (Colorado)	Two species have been named, both from isolated vertebrae	
Titanoceratops	2011	Fruitland Formation?/Kirtland Formation? (Late Cretaceous, Campanian)	United States (New Mexico)	Potentially a large, old specimen of Pentaceratops	
Tlatolophus	2021	Cerro del Pueblo Formation (Late Cretaceous, Campanian)	Mexico (Coahuila)	Possessed a short, broad crest resembling an inverted comma	
Torosaurus	1891	Frenchman Formation, Hell Creek Formation, Lance Formation, North Horn Formation?, Scollard Formation (Late Cretaceous, Maastrichtian)	Canada (Alberta; Saskatchewan); United States (Colorado? Montana? New Mexico? North Dakota? South Dakota; Texas? Utah? Wyoming)	Once believed to be potentially synonymous with Triceratops	
Torvosaurus	1979	Morrison Formation (Late Jurassic, Kimmeridgian to Tithonian)	United States (Colorado; Wyoming)	Had short but powerfully built arms. Several species, many of them unnamed, have been found in Europe, South America and possibly Africa	
Tototlmimus	2016	Packard Formation (Late Cretaceous, Campanian)	Mexico (Sonora)	The southernmost ornithomimid known from North America	
Trachodon	1856	Judith River Formation (Late Cretaceous, Campanian)	United States (Montana)	Several remains assigned to this genus actually belong to other taxa, most notably Edmontosaurus	
Triceratops	1889	Denver Formation, Evanston Formation, Hell Creek Formation, Lance Formation, Laramie Formation, Scollard Formation (Late Cretaceous, Maastrichtian)	Canada (Alberta; Saskatchewan?); United States (Colorado; Montana; South Dakota; Wyoming)	A common ceratopsid with long brow horns and a short nasal horn	
Trierarchuncus	2020	Hell Creek Formation (Late Cretaceous, Maastrichtian)	United States (Montana)	Known from remains of different sizes which depict how the claws of alvarezsaurids grew more hooked as they aged	
Tromerosaurus	2026	Dinosaur Park Formation, Oldman Formation (Late Cretaceous, Campanian)	Canada (Alberta)	Remains originally identified as Daspletosaurus and Gorgosaurus	
Troodon	1856	Judith River Formation, Two Medicine Formation? (Late Cretaceous, Campanian)	United States (Montana)	Usually seen as a dubious, undiagnostic genus, but a later study recommends the formal designation of a neotype to preserve its validity based on new troodontid fossil material discovered in the Two Medicine Formation	
Tyrannosaurus	1905	Frenchman Formation, Hall Lake Formation, Hell Creek Formation, Lance Formation, North Horn Formation, Scollard Formation, Willow Creek Formation (Late Cretaceous, Campanian to Maastrichtian)	Canada (Alberta; Saskatchewan); United States (Colorado; Montana; New Mexico; South Dakota; Utah; Wyoming)	The last, largest and most well-known tyrannosaurid	
Unescoceratops	2012	Dinosaur Park Formation (Late Cretaceous, Campanian)	Canada (Alberta)	Had the roundest teeth of any known leptoceratopsid	
Utahceratops	2010	Kaiparowits Formation (Late Cretaceous, Campanian)	United States (Utah)	Almost the entire skeleton is known, including the skull	
Utahraptor	1993	Cedar Mountain Formation (Early Cretaceous, Berriasian to Valanginian)	United States (Utah)	Very large and powerfully built	
Uteodon	2011	Morrison Formation (Late Jurassic, Tithonian)	United States (Utah)	May be a species of Camptosaurus, with a referred braincase being from Dryosaurus	
Utetitan	2025	Black Peaks Formation?, Javelina Formation?, North Horn Formation (Late Cretaceous, Maastrichtian)	United States (Texas? Utah)	Known from partial skeletons originally identified as possible northern specimens of Alamosaurus	
Vagaceratops	2010	Dinosaur Park Formation (Late Cretaceous, Campanian)	Canada (Alberta)	Possessed a row of fused epoccipitals folding over the top of the frill	
Velafrons	2007	Cerro del Pueblo Formation (Late Cretaceous, Campanian)	Mexico (Coahuila)	May have had elongated neural spines similar to those of Hypacrosaurus altispinus	
Venenosaurus	2001	Cedar Mountain Formation (Early Cretaceous, Aptian to Albian)	United States (Utah)	Its skeleton has traits of both titanosaurs and more basal macronarians	
Wendiceratops	2015	Oldman Formation (Late Cretaceous, Campanian)	Canada (Alberta)	Had three pairs of enlarged, curved epiparietals at the very top of its frill	
Xenoceratops	2012	Foremost Formation (Late Cretaceous, Campanian)	Canada (Alberta)	Possessed two long spikes at the top of its frill with smaller knobs at their bases	
Xenovenator	2026	Cerro del Pueblo Formation (Late Cretaceous, Campanian)	Mexico (Coahuila)	Had an unusually thickened skull roof which suggests it may have engaged in intraspecific combat	
Yehuecauhceratops	2017	Aguja Formation (Late Cretaceous, Campanian)	Mexico (Coahuila)	One of the smallest known ceratopsids	
Yurgovuchia	2012	Cedar Mountain Formation (Early Cretaceous, Valanginian)	United States (Utah)	May have had a flexible tail due to the structure of its caudal vertebrae	
Zapsalis	1876	Judith River Formation (Late Cretaceous, Campanian)	United States (Montana)	Some teeth referred to this genus actually belong to Saurornitholestes	
Zephyrosaurus	1980	Cloverly Formation (Early Cretaceous, Aptian to Albian)	United States (Montana)	Currently only known from fragmentary remains but several undescribed specimens exist	
Ziapelta	2014	Kirtland Formation (Late Cretaceous, Campanian)	United States (New Mexico)	Many specimens are known, most from the front part of the animal	
Zuniceratops	1998	Moreno Hill Formation (Late Cretaceous, Turonian to Coniacian)	United States (New Mexico)	Carried a pair of brow horns despite not being a member of the Ceratopsidae	
Zuul	2017	Judith River Formation (Late Cretaceous, Campanian)	United States (Montana)	Preserves several osteoderms, keratin and skin remains	

=== Invalid and potentially valid genera ===
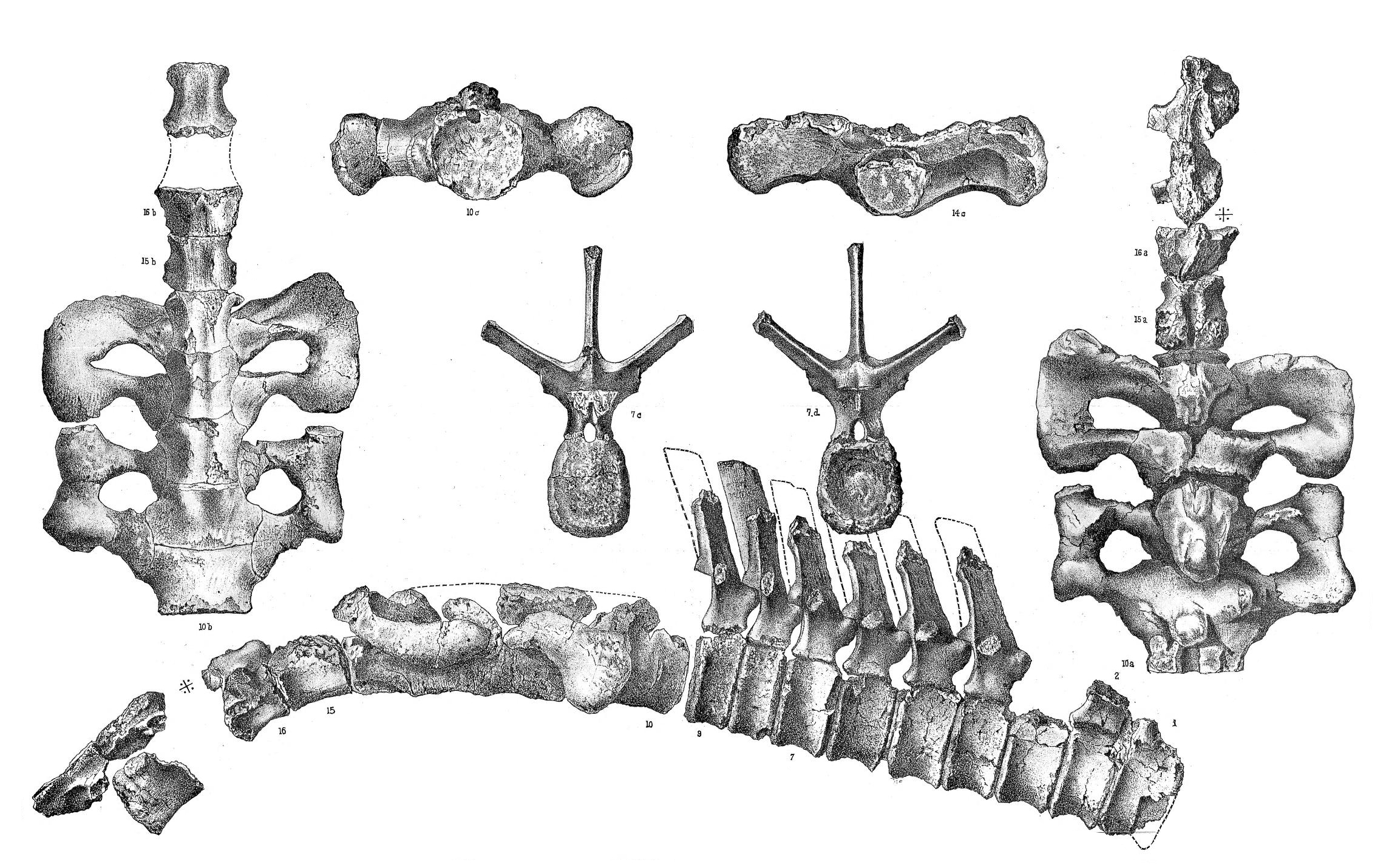
Agathaumas

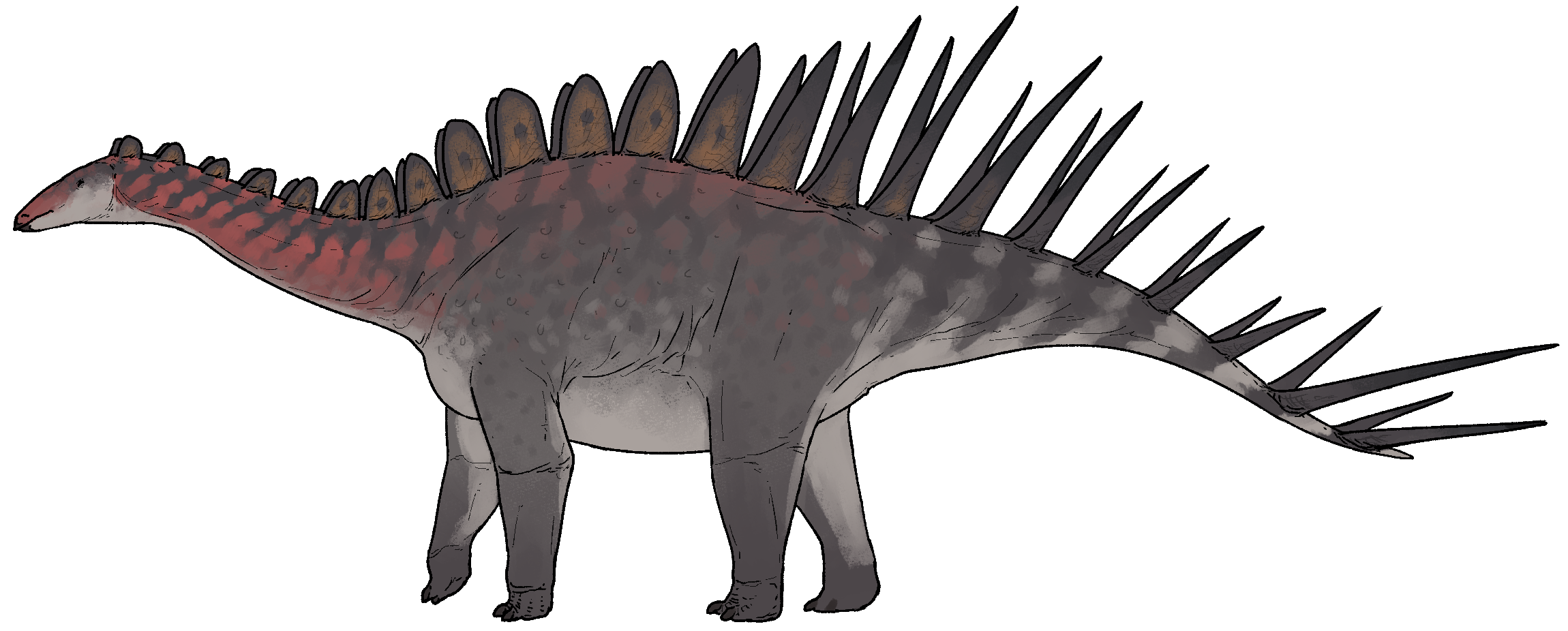
Alcovasaurus

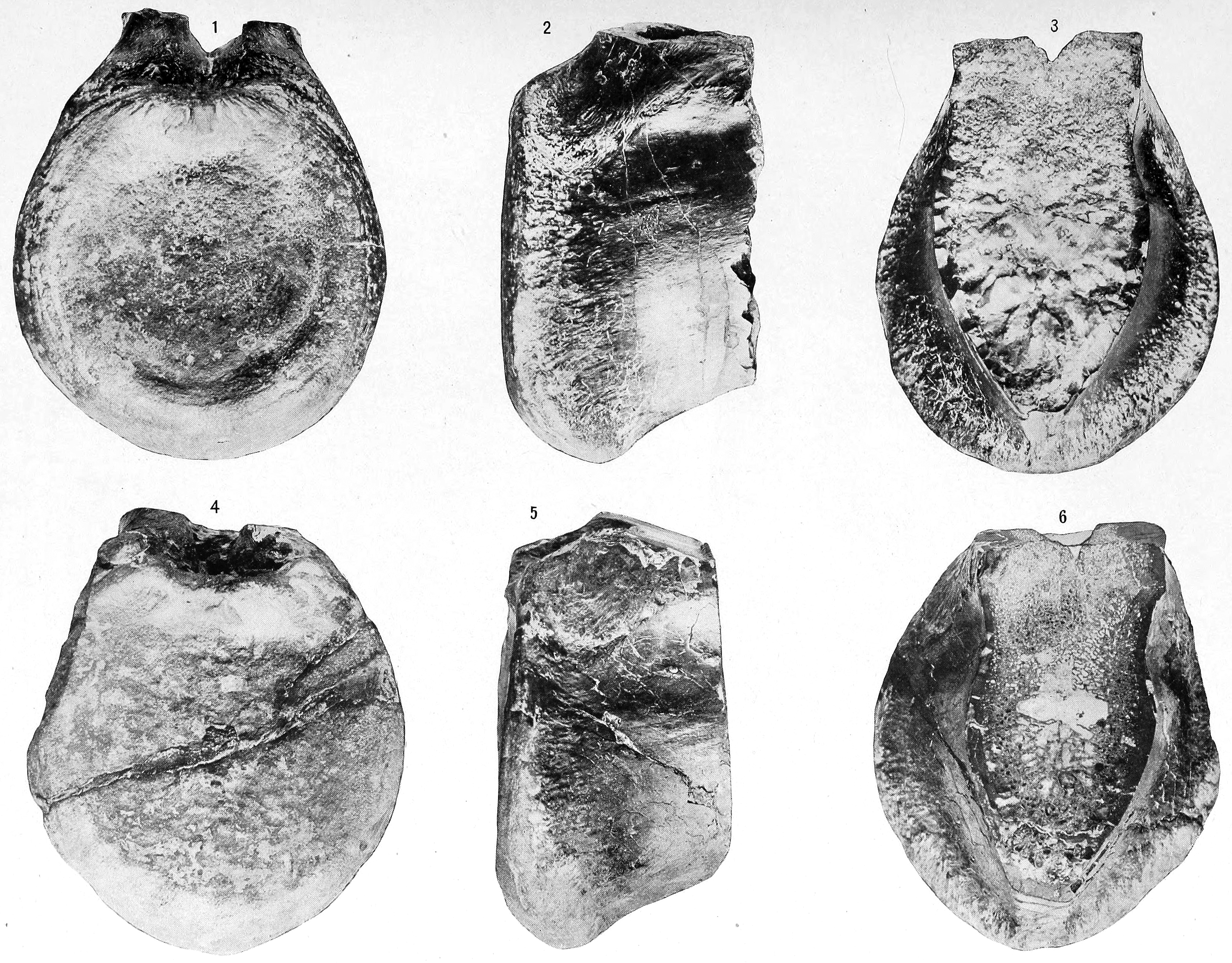
Antrodemus

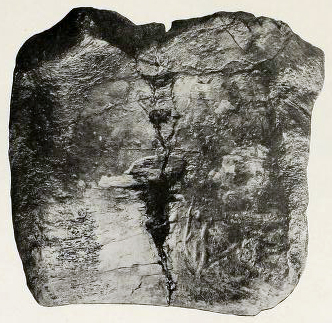
"Capitalsaurus"

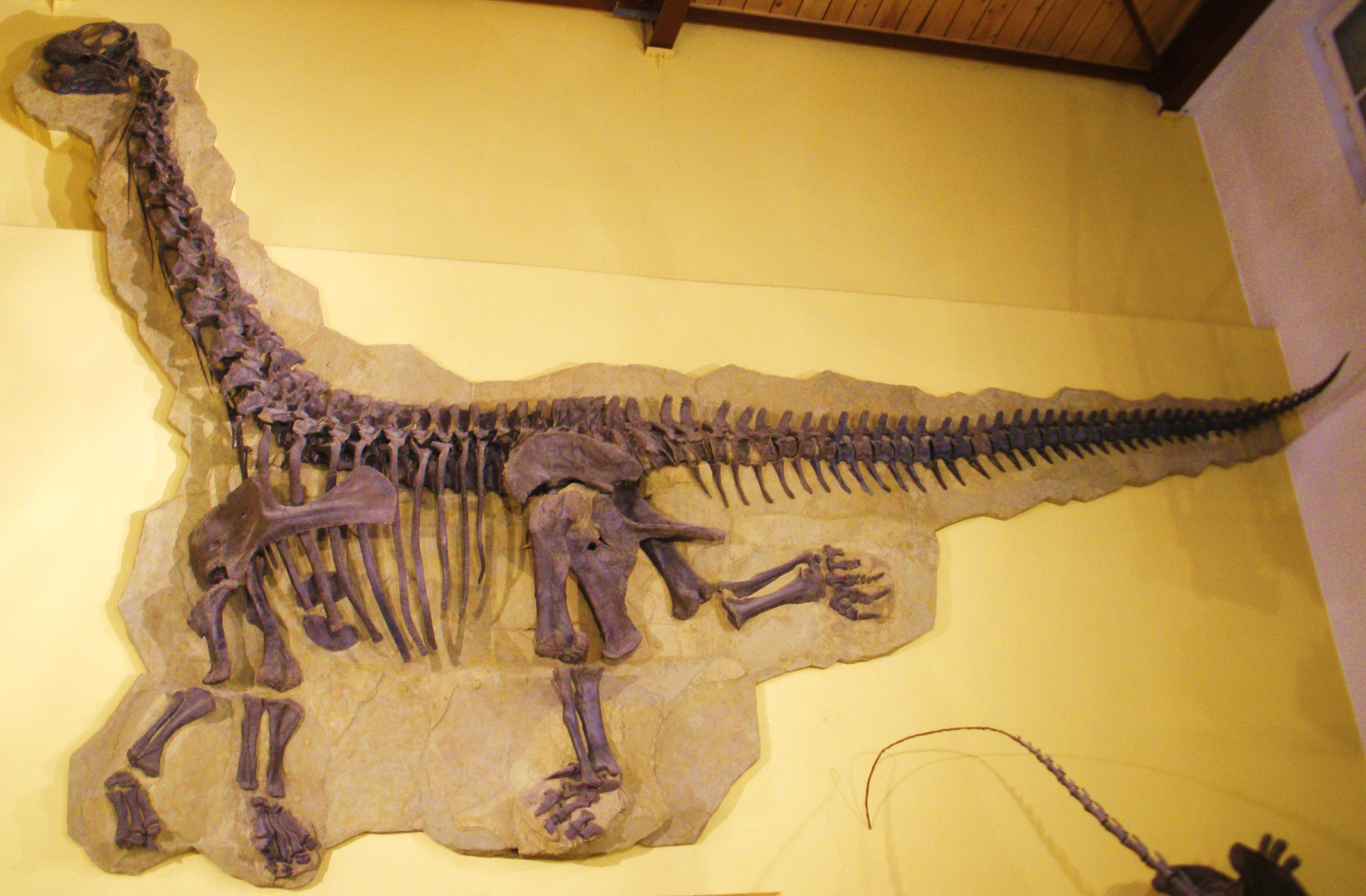
Cathetosaurus

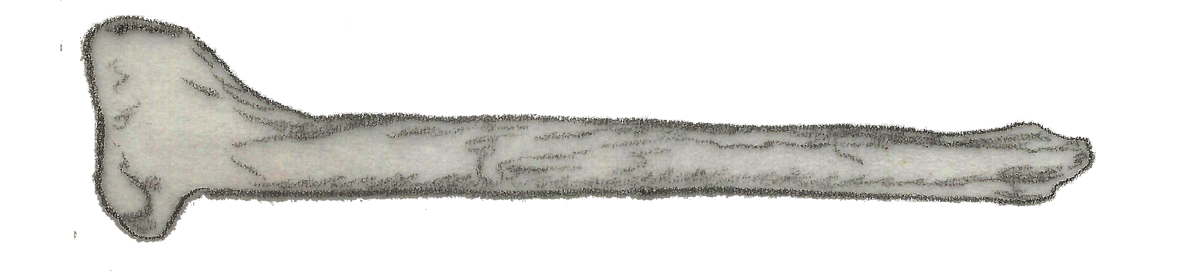
"Coelosaurus"

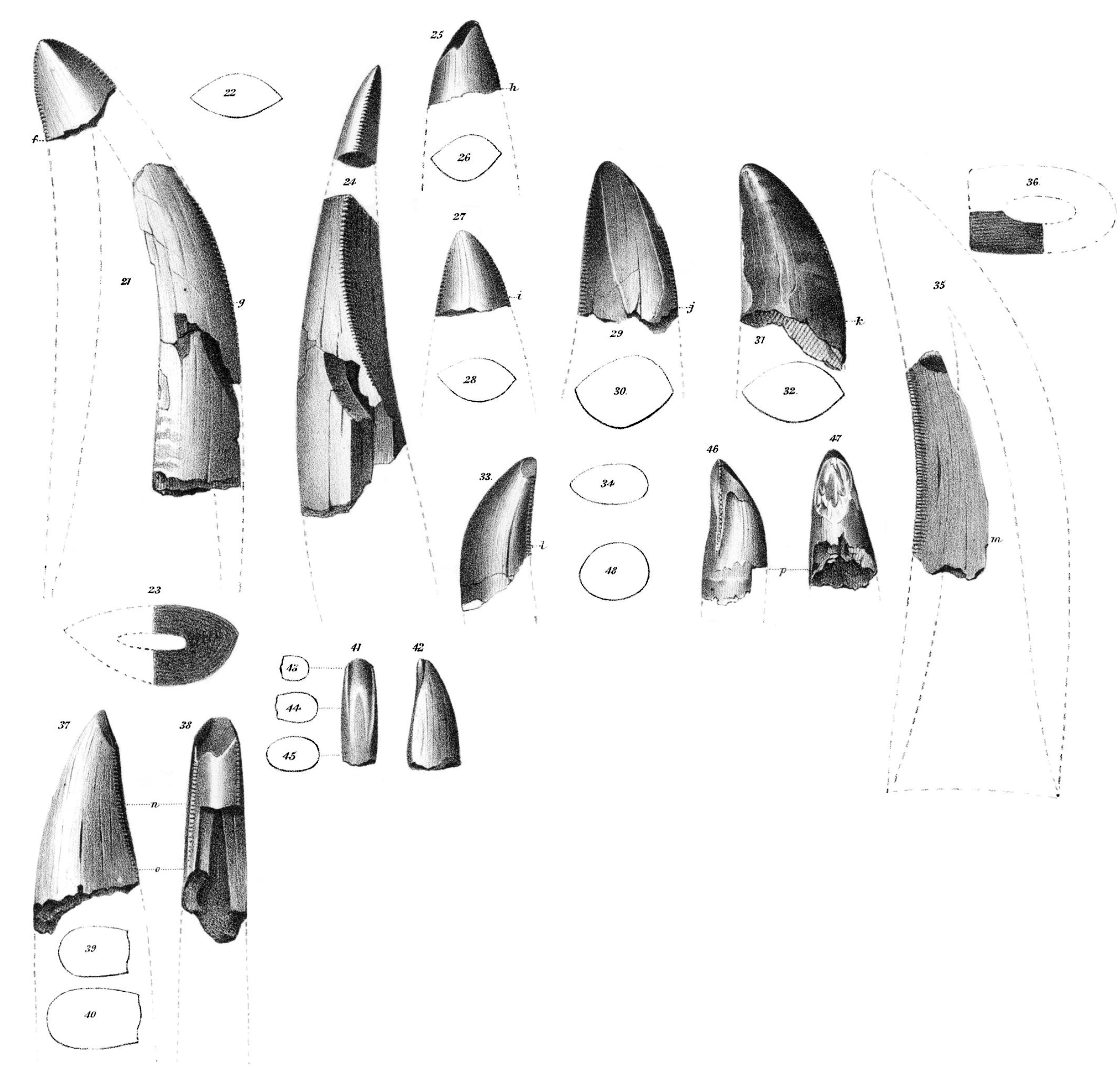
Deinodon

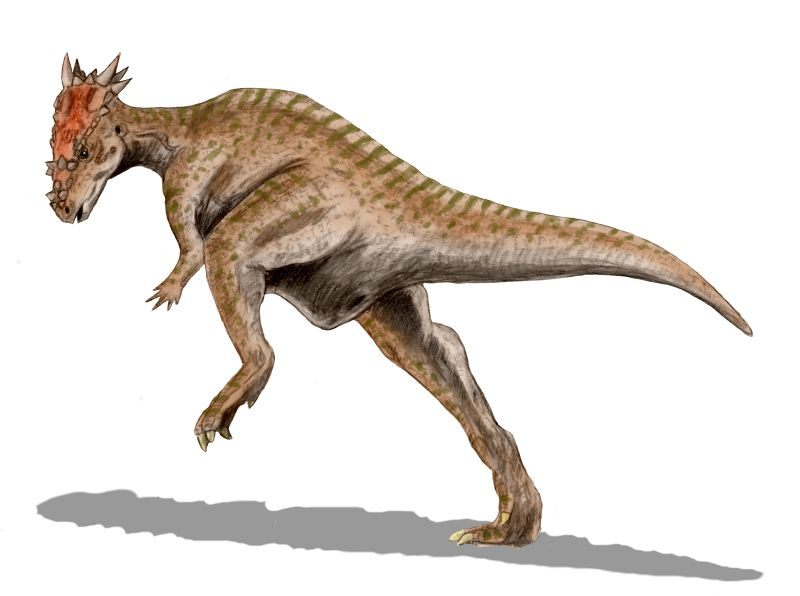
Dracorex

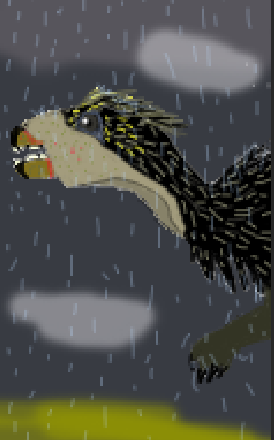
Drinker

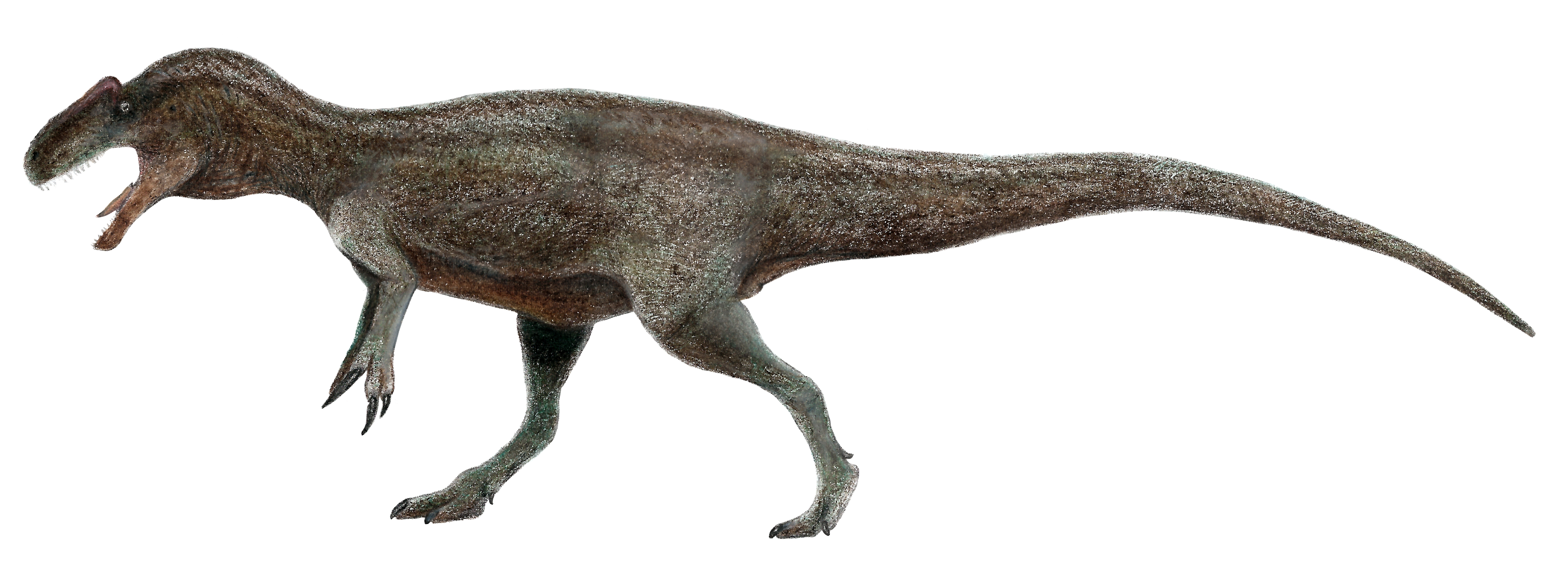
Epanterias

Geminiraptor

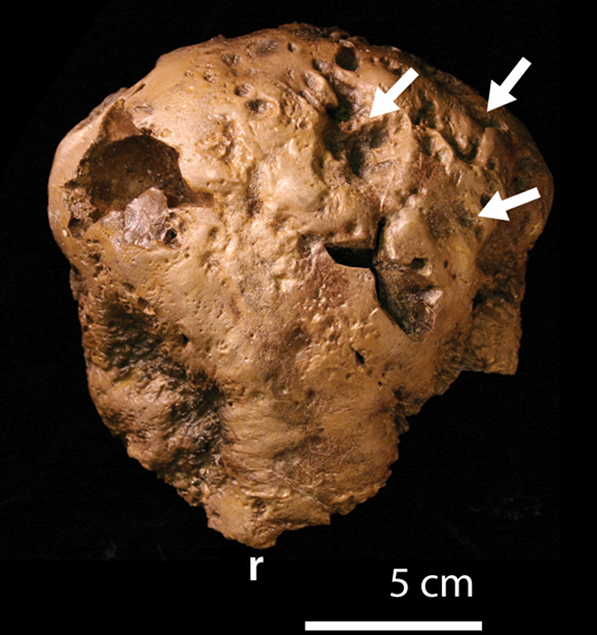
Gravitholus

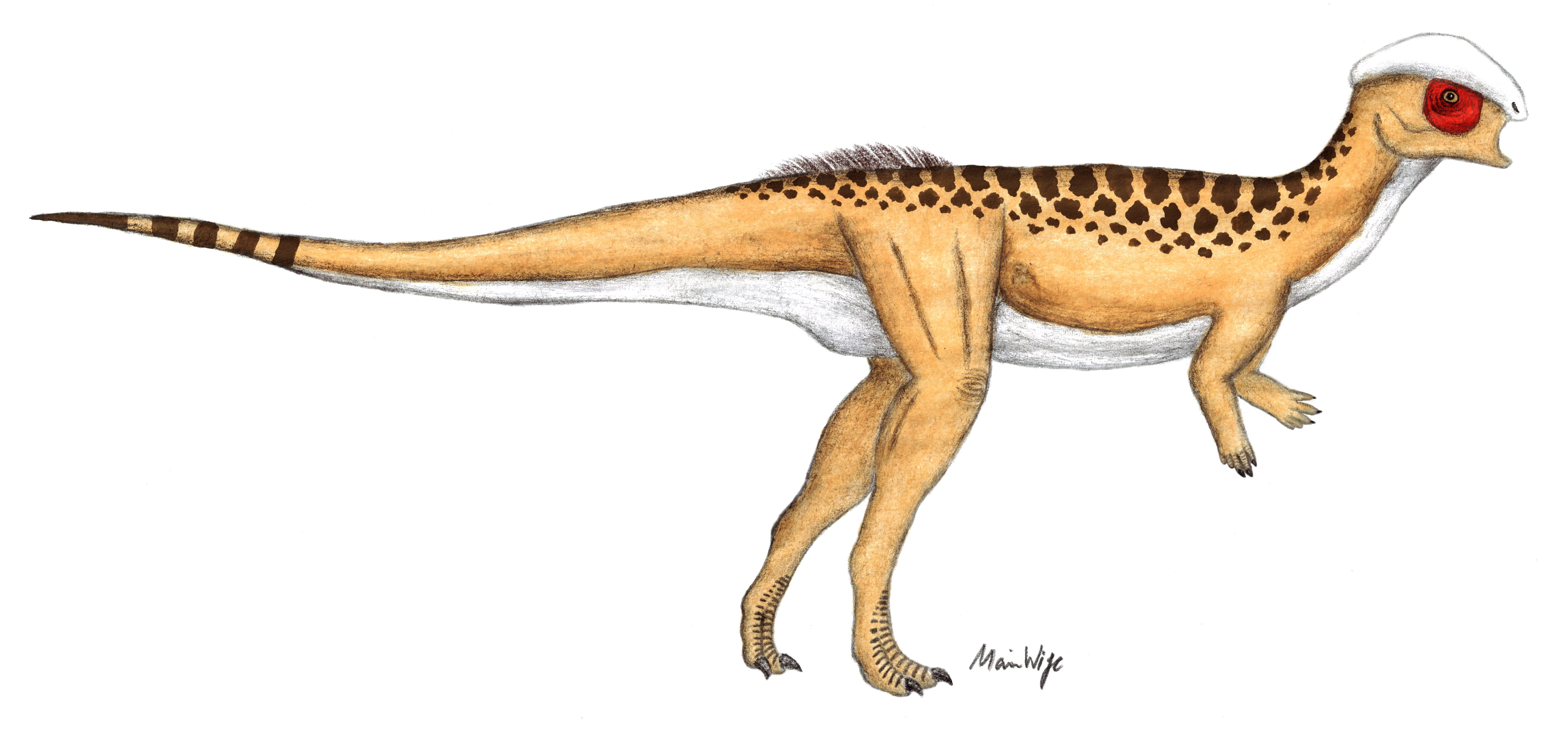
Hanssuesia

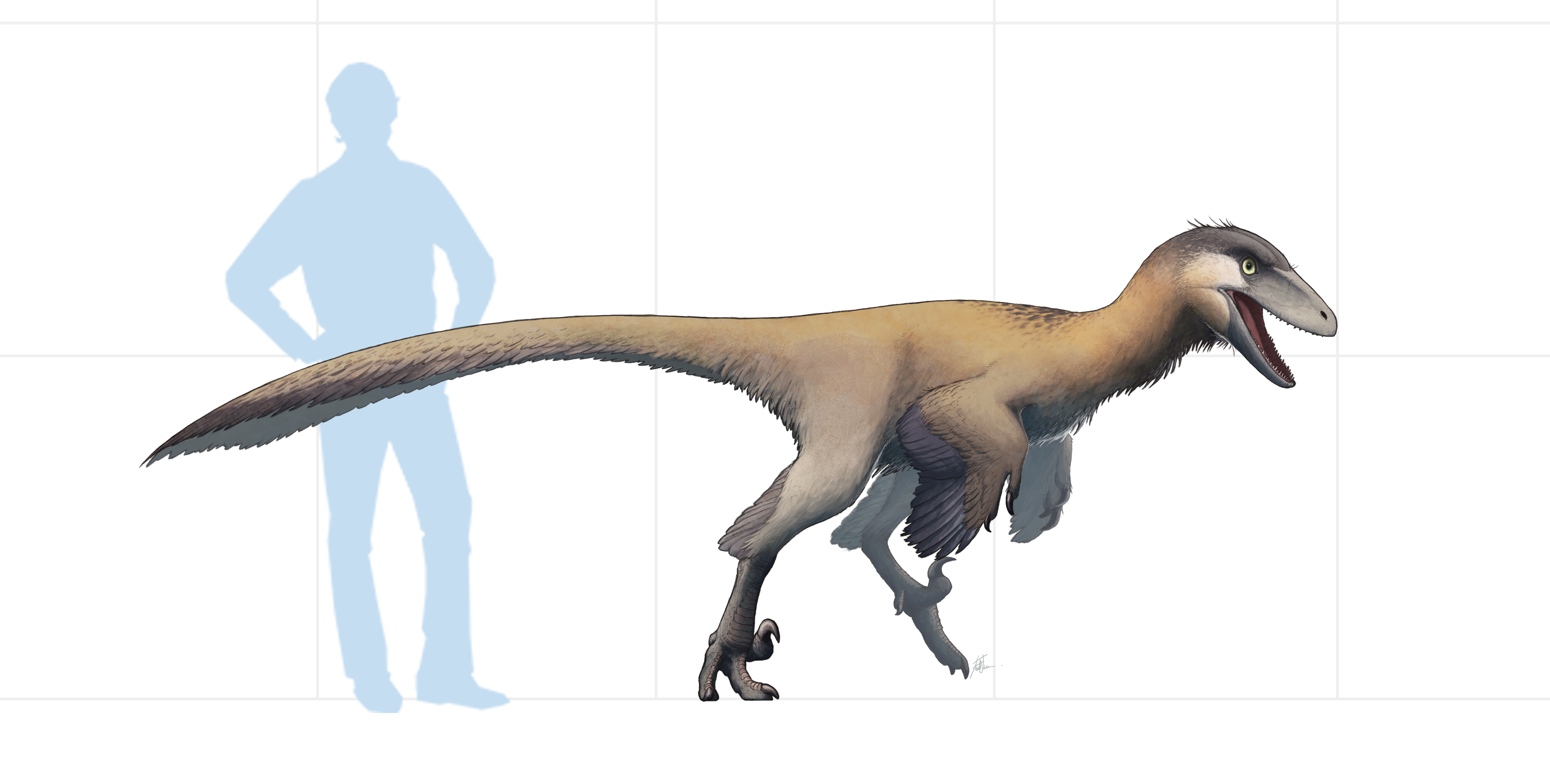
Latenivenatrix

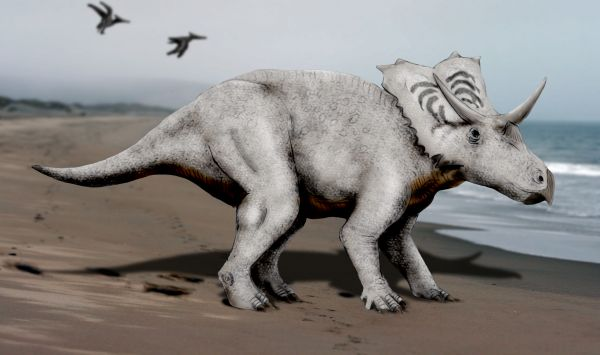
Mojoceratops

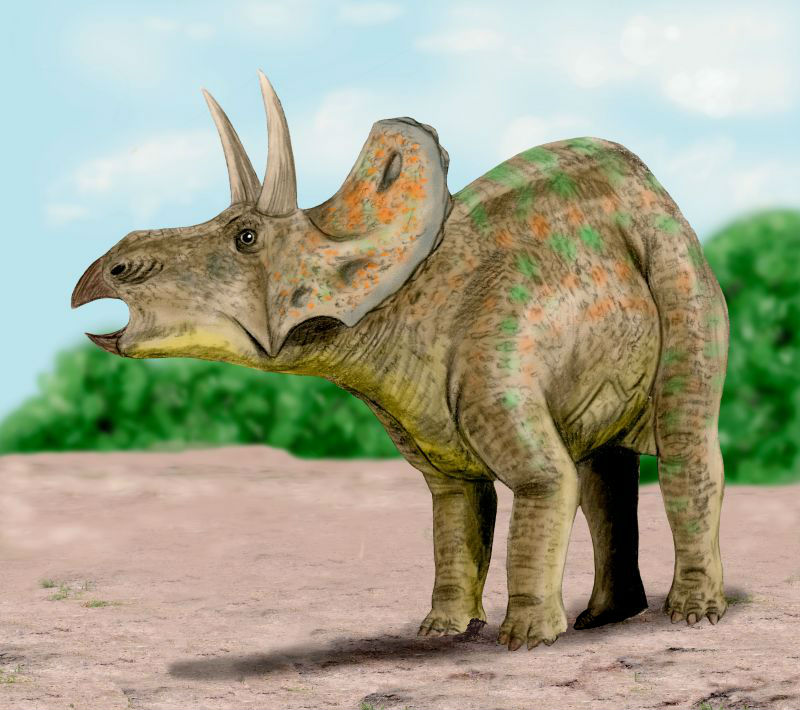
Nedoceratops

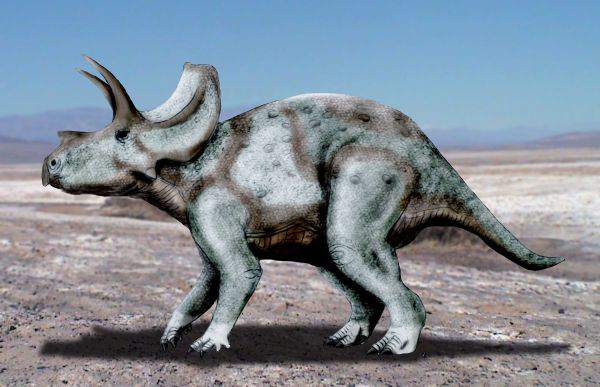
Ojoceratops

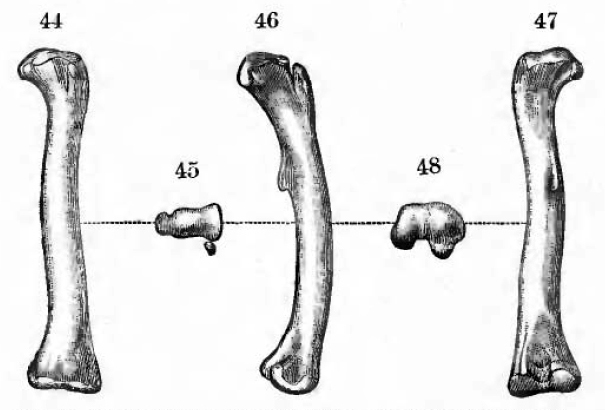
Othnielia

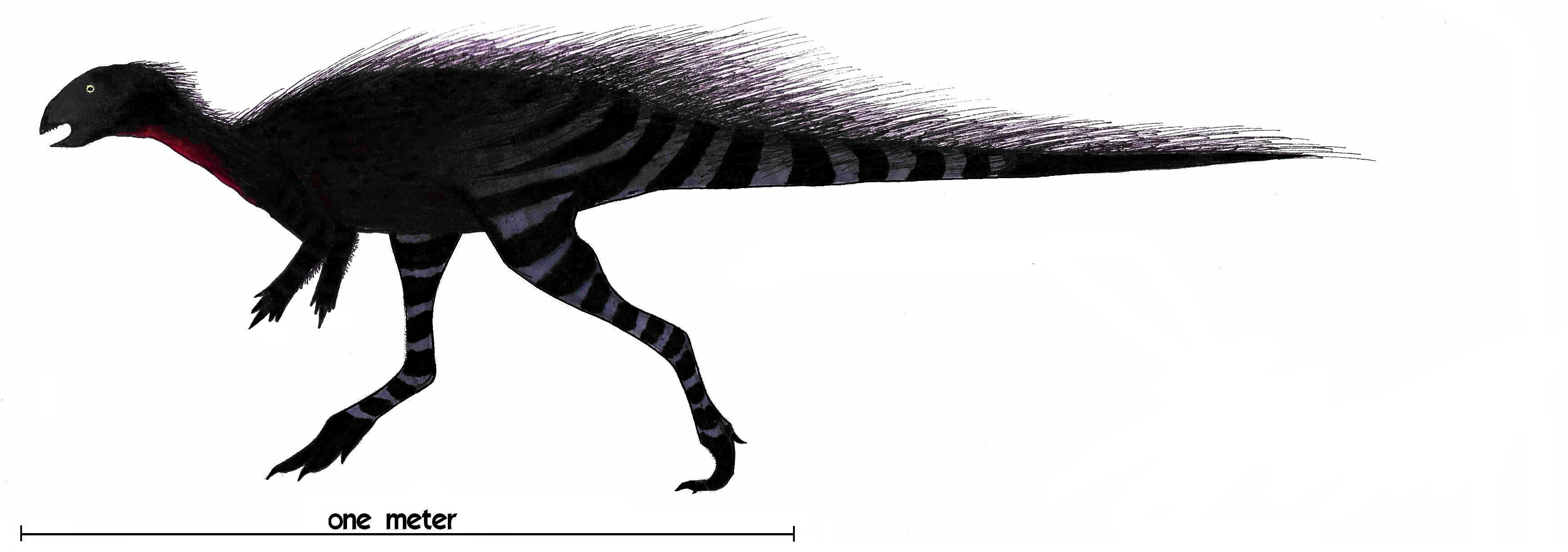
Othnielosaurus

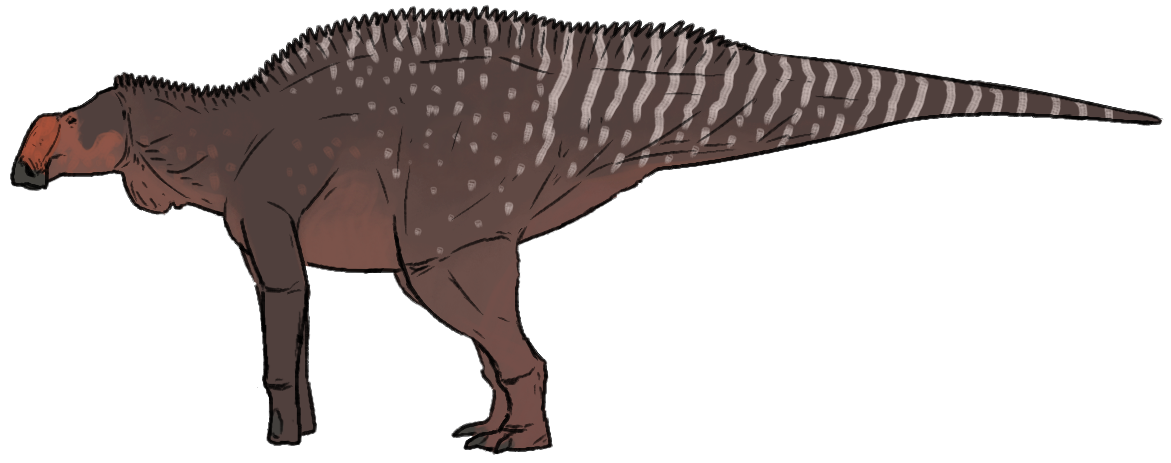
Rhinorex

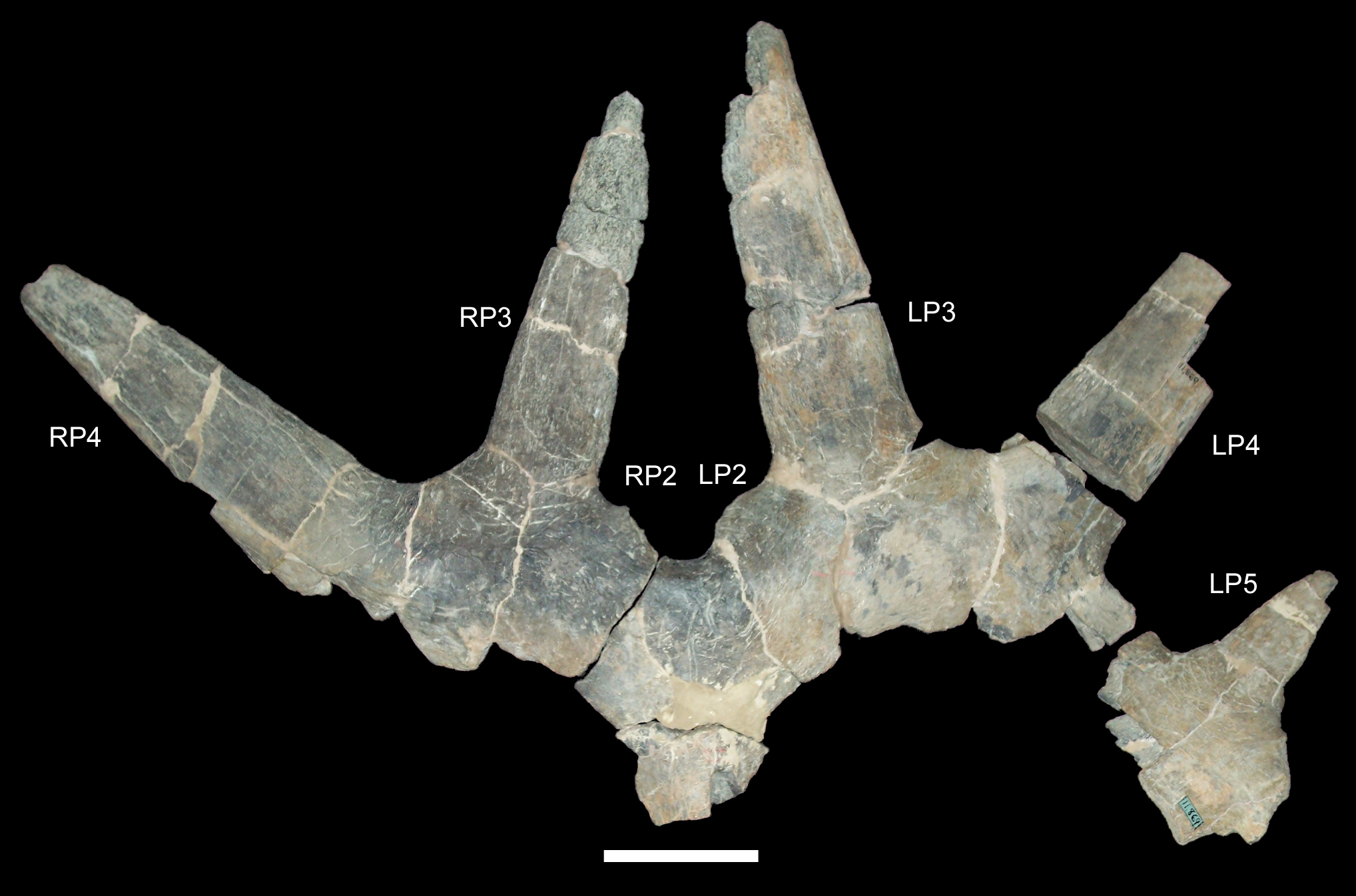
Rubeosaurus

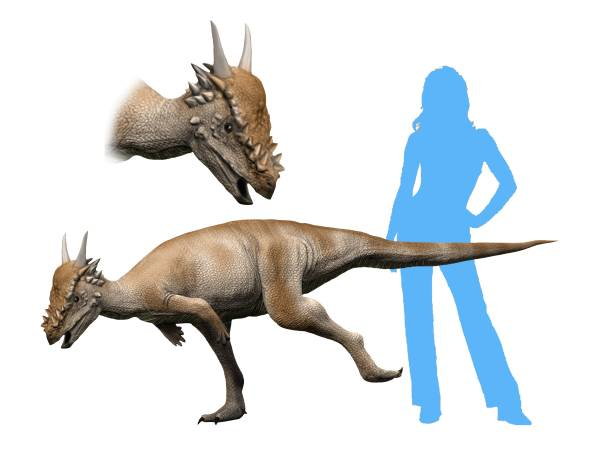
Stygimoloch

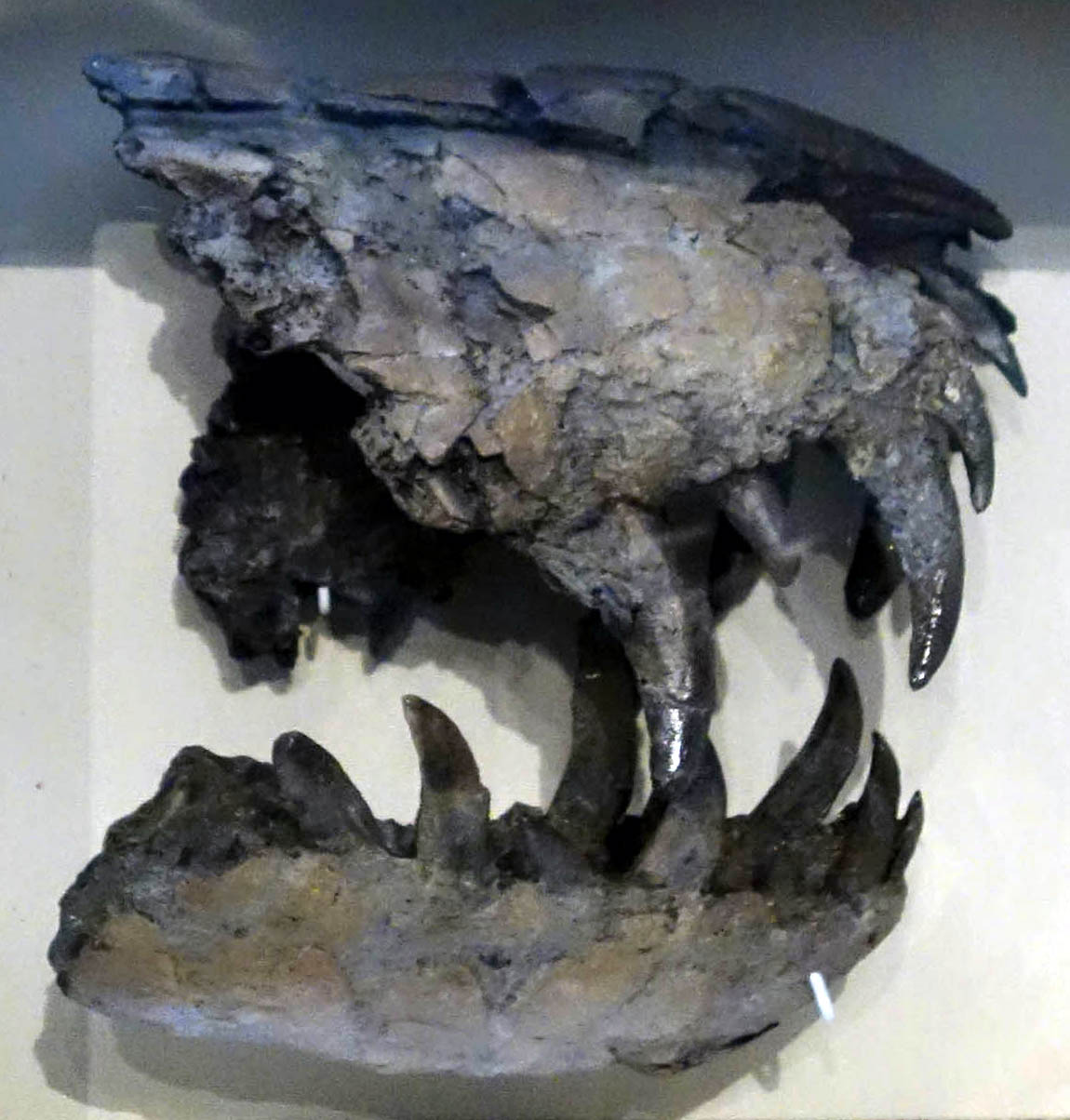
Stygivenator

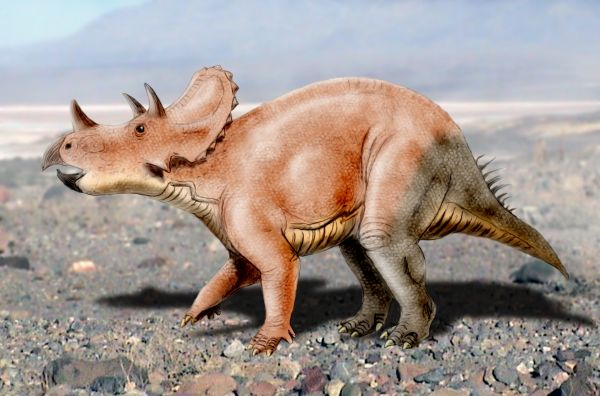
Tatankaceratops
- Agathaumas sylvestris: Mostly well-known from a painting by Charles R. Knight. It may have been a synonym of Triceratops, but without cranial remains, this cannot be confirmed.
- Alcovasaurus longispinus: Although originally named as a species of Stegosaurus, it may actually be a species of the otherwise European Miragaia. However, a later study has considered Miragaia a junior synonym of Dacentrurus, making Alcovasaurus a potentially distinct genus.
- Antrodemus valens: May represent the same animal as Allosaurus. If so, the name Antrodemus would have priority. However, because it is based on undiagnostic remains of uncertain provenance, this cannot be confirmed.
- Apatodon mirus: Its holotype was originally believed to be the jawbone of a Mesozoic pig, but has been reinterpreted as a dinosaur vertebra. What type of dinosaur it belonged to is unknown, but there have been suggestions that it was from Allosaurus.
- "Beelemodon": Known only from two teeth found in Wyoming. They share features of compsognathids, dromaeosaurids and basal oviraptorosaurs.
- "Capitalsaurus": The official dinosaur of the District of Columbia. It is known from a single vertebra discovered at the intersection of First and F Streets S.E., which is now appropriately named "Capitalsaurus Court".
- Cathetosaurus lewisi: Usually seen as a species of Camarasaurus, but an unpublished study argues that it might be a distinct genus.
- Claorhynchus trihedrus: An indeterminate cerapod that may be either a hadrosaurid or a ceratopsid, in which case it may be a synonym of Triceratops.
- "Coelosaurus" antiquus: The generic name is said to be preoccupied, but its namesake remains obscure.
- "Comanchesaurus kuesi": Only named in a dissertation. It has been described as a possible indeterminate saurischian.
- Deinodon horridus: Only known from teeth. Several referred teeth have since been found to belong to already known species, and the holotype itself could belong to Gorgosaurus.
- Dracorex hogwartsia: Described as a small, flat-headed pachycephalosaur. However, it is likely that it is just a juvenile Pachycephalosaurus.
- Drinker nisti: May be a synonym of Nanosaurus, but a recent analysis suggests that some features of its teeth are also present in pachycephalosaurs. If this assignment is correct, it would make this taxon the only pachycephalosaur known from the Jurassic.
- Epanterias amplexus: Possibly a large specimen of Allosaurus, but it may be a different taxon due to its younger age.
- Geminiraptor suarezarum: Originally named as a troodontid, but it was later reinterpreted as a second species of Falcarius.
- Gravitholus albertae: Potentially an older specimen of Stegoceras.
- Hanssuesia sternbergi: Generally believed to be synonymous with Stegoceras.
- Latenivenatrix mcmasterae: The largest known troodontid. It is sometimes suggested to be synonymous with Stenonychosaurus, which its remains were originally assigned to.
- "Magulodon muirkirkensis": Only known from a single tooth that may belong to either an ornithopod or a basal ceratopsian.
- "Microcephale": Said to be an extremely small pachycephalosaur, with skull caps only 5 centimetres (2.0 in) long.
- Mojoceratops perifania: May be a synonym of Chasmosaurus.
- Nedoceratops hatcheri: Due to its lack of a nasal horn, it has been named "Diceratops" (which is preoccupied by an insect) and Diceratus. However, it may simply be an unusual specimen of Triceratops.
- Ojoceratops fowleri: May be ancestral to Triceratops or a synonym of Eotriceratops.
- "Orcomimus": Potentially attributable to any of the ornithomimosaur taxa known from the Hell Creek Formation.
- Othnielia rex: Only known from an undiagnostic femur, but it may have belonged to Nanosaurus anyway.
- Othnielosaurus consors: Most likely a synonym of Nanosaurus.
- Palaeopteryx thomsoni: Known from a few very small bones which could belong to either a bird or a small bird-like dinosaur.
- Protoavis texensis: Described as a Triassic bird but is most likely a chimera consisting of elements from various unrelated tetrapods.
- Rhinorex condrupus: Phylogenetic analysis shows that it may fall within Gryposaurus, and thus be a junior synonym of that genus.
- Rubeosaurus ovatus: Likely a species of Styracosaurus, or even simply an unusual specimen of S. albertensis.
- Stygimoloch spinifer: Had a short skull dome with long horns jutting out from behind it. It is usually thought to be a subadult Pachycephalosaurus, but has been noted to be stratigraphically younger. Three attributed specimens recovered from the Ferris Formation, which is the taxon's southernmost occurrence, would make it distinct from the aforementioned genus.
- Stygivenator molnari: Uncertain whether it belongs to Tyrannosaurus or Nanotyrannus.
- Tatankaceratops sacrisonorum: Noted to possess a strange mix of features of both juvenile and adult Triceratops. It may be a dwarf specimen of that genus or an individual that stopped growing prematurely.

== Timeline ==
This is a timeline of selected dinosaurs from the list above. Time is measured in Ma, megaannum, along the x-axis.

== See also ==
- List of Appalachian dinosaurs - for dinosaurs specifically known from the former landmass of Appalachia (where much of eastern North America is now)
- List of North American birds
