= Palaeoctonus =

Palaeoctonus Temporal range: Late Triassic, 211–205 Ma

Scientific classification
- Domain: Eukaryota
- Kingdom: Animalia
- Phylum: Chordata
- Class: Reptilia
- Clade: Archosauromorpha
- Clade: Archosauriformes
- Order: †Phytosauria (?)
- Genus: †Palaeoctonus; Cope, 1877

Species
- †P. appalachianus; †P. aulacodus; †P. cyphodon; †P. dumblianus; †P. orthodon

Extinct genus of reptiles

Palaeoctonus is an extinct genus of archosaur (possibly phytosaur) known only from isolated teeth. The name is derived from Greek (palaios meaning "ancient", -ktonos meaning "killer"). The genus is believed to have flourished during the Upper (Late) Triassic period.
