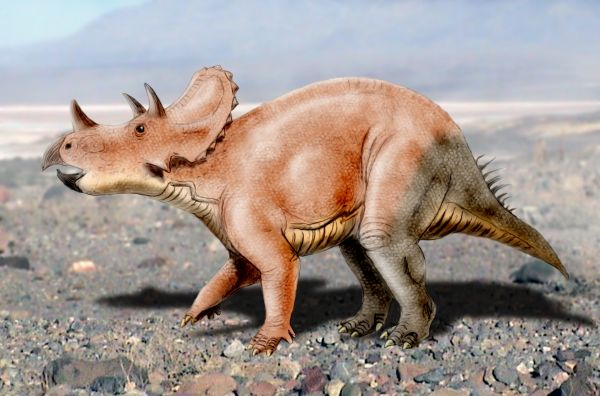
- Artist's restoration of Tatankaceratops

Scientific classification
- Kingdom: Animalia
- Phylum: Chordata
- Class: Reptilia
- Clade: Dinosauria
- Clade: †Ornithischia
- Clade: †Ceratopsia
- Family: †Ceratopsidae
- Subfamily: †Chasmosaurinae
- Tribe: †Triceratopsini
- Genus: †Tatankaceratops; Ott & Larson, 2010
- Species: †T. sacrisonorum

Binomial name
- †Tatankaceratops sacrisonorum Ott & Larson, 2010

= Tatankaceratops =

Tatankaceratops Temporal range: Late Maastrichtian, 66 Ma

Extinct genus of dinosaurs

Tatankaceratops (meaning "bison horned face") is a controversial genus of herbivorous chasmosaurine ceratopsid dinosaur that lived during the Late Cretaceous period (latest Maastrichtian stage, about 66 million years ago) in what is now the upper Hell Creek Formation, in South Dakota. It is known from a single partial skull housed at the Black Hills Institute, BHI 6226, described by Christopher J. Ott and Peter L. Larson in 2010 as the type species Tatankaceratops sacrisonorum.

In 2011, Nick Longrich published a paper containing a brief re-evaluation of Tatankaceratops. He suggested that the genus appeared to possess a bizarre mix of characteristics from adult and juvenile Triceratops specimens; the animal's small size and short, slender brow horns are consistent with the animal being a juvenile, but the gnarled bone and fusion of skull elements to one another are typical of old adult ceratopsids. The elongate nose horn meanwhile was characteristic of Triceratops, and specifically, the highly advanced T. prorsus. Longrich also noted that this animal could represent a dwarf species of Triceratops or simply a specimen of the aforementioned genus with a developmental disorder which caused it to stop growing prematurely. Other paleontologists, including Thomas R. Holtz, Jr., have written that they "strongly suspect" Tatankaceratops is merely a juvenile specimen of Triceratops. Authors of subsequent studies involving triceratopsins have not considered it a valid genus.

== Systematics ==
The cladogram below follows Ott and Larson (2010).

- Neoceratopsia
  - Protoceratops
  - Ceratopsoidea
    - Zuniceratops
    - Ceratopsidae
      - Centrosaurinae
        - - - - Achelousaurus
              - Pachyrhinosaurus
            - Einiosaurus
          - - Centrosaurus
            - Styracosaurus
        - Avaceratops
      - Chasmosaurinae
        - - - - Anchiceratops
              - Arrhinoceratops
            - - Nedoceratops
              - - Torosaurus
                - Triceratops
          - - Chasmosaurus
            - Pentaceratops
        - Tatankaceratops

== See also ==
- Timeline of ceratopsian research
