= Dolichoderus obliteratus =

Dolichoderus obliteratus Temporal range: Miocene

Scientific classification
- Domain: Eukaryota
- Kingdom: Animalia
- Phylum: Arthropoda
- Class: Insecta
- Order: Hymenoptera
- Family: Formicidae
- Subfamily: Dolichoderinae
- Genus: Dolichoderus
- Species: D. obliteratus

Binomial name
- Dolichoderus obliteratus (Scudder, 1877)

Species of ant

Dolichoderus obliteratus is an extinct species of Miocene ant in the genus Dolichoderus. Described by Samuel Hubbard Scudder in 1877, only a fossilised wing of the species was found in Canada.
