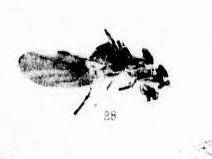
- Holotype

Scientific classification
- Domain: Eukaryota
- Kingdom: Animalia
- Phylum: Arthropoda
- Class: Insecta
- Order: Hymenoptera
- Family: Formicidae
- Subfamily: Myrmicinae
- Genus: Aphaenogaster
- Species: †A. longaeva

Binomial name
- †Aphaenogaster longaeva Scudder, 1877

= Aphaenogaster longaeva =

Aphaenogaster longaeva Temporal range: Ypresian?

Extinct species of ant

Aphaenogaster longaeva is an extinct species of ant in formicid subfamily Myrmicinae known from a solitary Eocene or Oligocene fossil found in North America. A. longaeva was one of five insect species described by the paleoentomologist Samuel Hubbard Scudder in an 1877 paper.

== History and classification ==
Aphaenogaster longaeva is known from a single insect which is a compression-impression fossil preserved in fine shale of the Quesnel beds, possibly Fraser Formation, near Quesnel, British Columbia. During the initial surveys of the area by George Mercer Dawson, clay silt and sand outcrops were identified along the banks of the Fraser River, and a small sampling was performed by Dawson. The fossils were mostly of plants such as beech, walnut, and poplar. Scudder in 1890 notes that the fossil insects collected represented twenty-five species, dominated by Hymenoptera and Diptera specimens, with a single Coleopteran fossil found. Dawson tentatively assigned the Quesnel fossils a Miocene age based on the floral similarity to fossil sites of Alaska. The age of the site has been changed at least twice since the original description, with the fossils being listed as Eocene in age in a 1978 paper by Laurie Burnham. More recently the site was suggested to be of Oligocene age by Archibald and Mathewes (2000) based on the fossils of nearby Quilchena, British Columbia. Archibald et al (2018) considered the fossil site itself to be lost, but most likely to belong to the Eocene Okanagan Highlands, a series of Ypresian age lakebeds arcing from Driftwood Canyon north of Quesnel, to the Klondike Mountain Formation sites around Republic, Washington to the south.

At the time of description the species was known from a single fragmentary fossil and its less detailed counterpart. The part side of the holotype was deposited in collections of the Canadian Geological Survey while the counterpart was placed in the Museum of Comparative Zoology paleontology collections at Harvard University. Along with a number of other insect type specimens, the A. longaeva holotype counterpart is part of the Samuel Hubbard Scudder insect collection donated to Harvard in 1902. The fossil was first studied by paleoentomologist Scudder with his 1877 type description of the new species being published in an addendum to Dawson's Report of Progress, Geological Survey of Canada, 1875–76. The etymology for the specific epithet longaeva was not given with the type description. A. longaeva was one of five Formicidae species which Scudder described in the paper. Placement of the species into Aphaenogaster was based on the very similar vein structure and shape of the discoidal cell between A. longaeva and "Aphaenogaster" berendti, described from Baltic amber. However the latter species was subsequently moved to the genus Stenamma as Stenamma berendti. Due to the incomplete nature of the type specimens used in Scudder's descriptions, four of the five species from Quesnel were considered to be of uncertain genus by Frank M. Carpenter in his review of North American ant fossils, with A. longaeva listed as "(Myrmicinae) longaeva". Archibald et al (2018) noted the species is in need of reexamination and possible revision.

== Description ==
The Aphaenogaster longaeva fossil is a jumble of parts that obscure the total length of the adult, though the preserved wings and body segments possibly indicate it to be a male. Scudder in 1890 indicates the fossil to contain portions of the head, antennae, thorax, legs and wings. The wing overall would have had an approximate length, if complete, of 7 millimetres (0.28 in), and is 2.3 millimetres (0.091 in) wide. It shows a darkened coloration from the pterostigma to the wing tip, with the pterostigma itself being the darkest portion of the wing. The wing also shows a scattered covering of small hairs that Scudder described as "excessively delicate".
