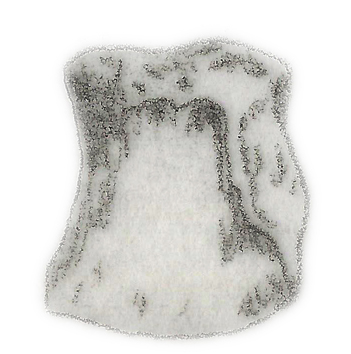
- Vertebra from the holotype of T. lucasanus

Scientific classification
- Kingdom: Animalia
- Phylum: Chordata
- Class: Reptilia
- Clade: Dinosauria
- Clade: †Ornithischia
- Clade: †Ornithopoda
- Family: †incertae sedis
- Genus: †Tichosteus; Cope, 1877

Type species
- †Tichosteus lucasanus Cope, 1877 (nomen dubium)

Other species
- †T. aequifacies Cope, 1878 (nomen dubium)

= Tichosteus =

Tichosteus Temporal range: Late Jurassic, Kimmeridgian

Extinct genus of dinosaurs

Tichosteus (meaning "walled bone") is a genus of herbivorous dinosaur from the Late Jurassic. It is known only from vertebrae recovered from Kimmeridgian rocks in the Morrison Formation, Colorado.

== History ==
In 1877 Edward Drinker Cope named the type species Tichosteus lucasanus. The generic name is derived from Greek teichos, "wall", and osteon, "bone", referring to the fact that the vertebrae, though hollow inside, had no lateral pneumatic foramina, openings in the side wall for air sacks to invade the bone. The specific name honours superintendent of public schools Oramel W. Lucas, who collected two vertebrae for Cope, near Arkansas River. The dorsal vertebrae, together forming the holotype AMNH 5770, are about 23 millimetres (0.91 in) long. Cope estimated the size of the animal as that of an alligator; Charles Craig Mook later compared it to a wolf. The specimen represents a subadult individual, as can be seen from the suture between the vertebral centrum and the neural arch.

In 1878 Cope named a second species: Tichosteus aequifacies. The specific name is derived from Latin aequus, "equal", and facies, "face", referring to the more symmetric extremities of the vertebrae as compared to T. lucasanus. The type specimen, AMNH 5771, again consists of two vertebrae.

== Classification ==
Cope himself was rather puzzled by the affinities of Tichosteus, providing no classification apart from the fact that it was named in an article dedicated to reptiles. Later authors often saw Tichosteus as a theropod. At the end of the twentieth century, it was suggested that it may have been a basal iguanodont; the species are nomina dubia and are incertae sedis within Ornithopoda.
