= Apatodon =

Apatodon Temporal range: Late Jurassic, 156.3–145 Ma

Scientific classification
- Kingdom: Animalia
- Phylum: Chordata
- Class: Reptilia
- Clade: Dinosauria
- Genus: †Apatodon; Marsh, 1877
- Species: †A. mirus

Binomial name
- †Apatodon mirus Marsh, 1877

Extinct genus of dinosaurs

Apatodon is a dubious genus of dinosaur that may have been a theropod. The type, and only species, A. mirus, was named in 1877 by Othniel Charles Marsh. It was found in the Late Jurassic-aged Morrison Formation of Colorado.

== History ==
When Marsh named Apatodon in 1877, he thought it was a jaw with a tooth from a Mesozoic pig, but it was soon shown that the specimen was an eroded vertebra, from a dinosaur possibly from the Morrison Formation of Garden Park, Colorado. Baur (1890) correctly identified that Marsh (1877) had misidentified the neural spine as the tooth of a pig-like animal.

Apatodon was assigned to Iguanodontoidea by Hay in 1902, to Ornithischia by von Huene in 1909, to Stegosauridae by von Zittel in 1911, and to Titanosaurinae by Steel in 1970, and also Casanovas et al. in 1987. (Kuhn in 1939 also listed Apatodon as a sauropod).

The only recovered specimen is not regarded as sufficient to identify a particular species of dinosaur. However, George Olshevsky considered Apatodon to be synonymous with the contemporaneous Allosaurus fragilis. The issue is now beyond resolution; however, as the type bone fragment has been lost.

== Etymology ==
The name Apatodon is derived from Greek: απατη ("trick", "deceit") and οδους (genitive οδοντος) ("tooth", in reference to its original, incorrect identification).
