= 1873 in paleontology =

Paleontology or palaeontology is the study of prehistoric life forms on Earth through the examination of plant and animal fossils. This includes the study of body fossils, tracks (ichnites), burrows, cast-off parts, fossilised feces (coprolites), palynomorphs and chemical residues. Because humans have encountered fossils for millennia, paleontology has a long history both before and after becoming formalized as a science. This article records significant discoveries and events related to paleontology that occurred or were published in the year 1873.

== Plants ==
=== Algae ===
Name	Novelty	Status	Authors	Age	Unit	Location	Synonymized taxa	Notes	Images
Fucus lignitum	Sp nov		Lesquereux	Cretaceous	Montana Group	USA; Wyoming		A brown algae species.	

=== Mosses ===
Name	Novelty	Status	Authors	Age	Unit	Location	Synonymized taxa	Notes	Images
Hypnum haydenii	Sp nov	jr synonym	Lesquereux	eocene Priabonian	Florissant Formation	USA; Colorado		Described as a moss species. Moved to Sequoia haydenii (1907). Moved to Juniparis haydenii (1912).	

=== Ferns ===
Name	Novelty	Status	Authors	Age	Unit	Location	Synonymized taxa	Notes	Images
Salvinia attenuata	Sp nov	jr synonym	Lesquereux	Cretaceous	Montana Group	USA; Wyoming		Described as a watermoss species. Moved to Marsilea attenuata (1894).	

=== Lycophytes ===
Name	Novelty	Status	Authors	Age	Unit	Location	Synonymized taxa	Notes	Images
Selaginella? falcata	Sp nov	jr homonym	Lesquereux	Cretaceous	Montana Group	USA; Wyoming		A possible spikemoss species. Junior homonym of Selaginella falcata (P.Beauv.) Spring (1843).	
Selaginella laciniata	Sp nov		Lesquereux	Cretaceous	Montana Group	USA; Wyoming		A possible spikemoss species.	

=== Conifers ===
Name	Novelty	Status	Authors	Age	Unit	Location	Synonymized taxa	Notes	Images
Sequoia biformis	Sp nov	jr synonym	Lesquereux	Cretaceous	Montana Group	USA; Wyoming		Described as a coast redwood species. Moved to Geinitzia biformis (1900).	
Widdringtonia complanata	Sp nov	jr synonym	Lesquereux	Cretaceous	Montana Group	USA; Wyoming		Described as an African cypress species. Moved to Callitris complanata (1887).	

=== Monocots ===
Name	Novelty	Status	Authors	Age	Unit	Location	Synonymized taxa	Notes	Images
Ottelia americana	Sp nov		Lesquereux	Cretaceous	Montana Group	USA; Wyoming		Described as an anacharioid hydrocharitaceous species.	
Pistia corrugata	Sp nov	jr synonym	Lesquereux	Cretaceous	Montana Group	USA; Wyoming		Described as a water cabbage species. Moved to Cobbania corrugata (2007).	

=== Eudicots ===
Name	Novelty	Status	Authors	Age	Unit	Location	Synonymized taxa	Notes	Images
Alnites unequilateralis	Sp nov	jr synonym	Lesquereux	Eocene; Ypresian	Green River Formation	USA; Wyoming		First described as a betulaceous species. Moved to Alnus inaequilateralis Moved to (1883); Moved to Planera inaequilateralis (1923). Moved to Bursera inaequilateralis (1969)	Bursera inaequilateralis
Carpites viburni	Sp nov	jr synonym	Lesquereux	Eocene; Ypresian	Green River Formation	USA; Wyoming		A walnut species.	Carpites viburni
Dryophyllum crenatum	Sp nov		Lesquereux	Cretaceous	Montana Group	USA; Wyoming		A Fagaceous or Juglandaceous species.	
Dryophyllum subfalcatum	Sp nov	valid	Lesquereux	Cretaceous	Montana Group	USA; Wyoming		A Fagaceous or Juglandaceous species.	Dryophyllum subfalcatum
Grewiopsis cleburnii	Sp nov	valid	Lesquereux	Cretaceous	Montana Group	USA; Wyoming		A platanaceous species.	
Juglans alkalina	Sp nov	jr synonym	Lesquereux	Eocene; Ypresian	Green River Formation	USA; Wyoming		A walnut species.	
Laurus (Persea) praestans	Sp nov		Lesquereux	Cretaceous	Montana Group	USA; Wyoming		A possible laural species.	
Populus melanarioides	Sp nov	valid	Lesquereux	Cretaceous	Montana Group	USA; Wyoming		A cottonwood/aspen species.	
Rhus membranacea	Sp nov		Lesquereux	Cretaceous	Montana Group	USA; Wyoming		A sumac species.	
Trapa? microphylla	Sp nov	valid	Lesquereux	Cretaceous	Montana Group	USA; Wyoming		A possible water caltrop species.	
Viburnum rotundifolium	Sp nov	jr homonym	Lesquereux	Cretaceous	Montana Group	USA; Wyoming		A Viburnum species. Junior homonym of Viburnum rotundifolium Rafinesque, 1838	

== Fungi ==
Name	Novelty	Status	Authors	Age	Unit	Location	Synonymized taxa	Notes	Images
Sphaeria rhytismoides	Sp nov	jr homonym	Lesquereux	Cretaceous	Montana Group	USA; Wyoming		A fungi species. Junior homonym of Sphaeria rhytismoides Ettingshausen, 1868; Moved to replacement name Sphaerites lesquereuxii (1892).	

== Arthropods ==
=== Newly named insects ===
Name	Novelty	Status	Authors	Age	Unit	Location	Notes	Images
Bothriomyrmex constricta	Comb nov	Jr synonym	(Mayr)	Lutetian	Baltic amber	Europe	Fossil Dolichoderin ant jr synonym of Anonychomyrma constricta	Anonychomyrma constricta
Bothriomyrmex geinitzi	Comb nov	Jr synonym	Mayr	Lutetian	Baltic amber	Europe	Fossil Dolichoderin ant, jr synonym of Anonychomyrma geinitzi	Anonychomyrma geinitzi

== Sauropterygia ==
=== Newly named plesiosaurs ===
Name	Novelty	Status	Authors	Age	Location	Notes	Images
Liopleurodon	Gen et sp nov	Valid	Sauvage	Callovian	France; Germany; UK	A pliosaurid	

== Ichthyosaurs ==
=== Newly named ichthyosaurs ===
Name	Status	Authors	Age	Unit	Location	Notes	Images
Cetarthrosaurus	Valid	Seeley	late Albian/early Cenomanian	Cambridge Greensand Formation	United Kingdom		

== Other ==
Name	Status	Authors	Age	Unit	Location	Notes	Images
Dawsonia campanulata	Valid	Nicholson	Silurian	Moffat Shales Group	United Kingdom		
