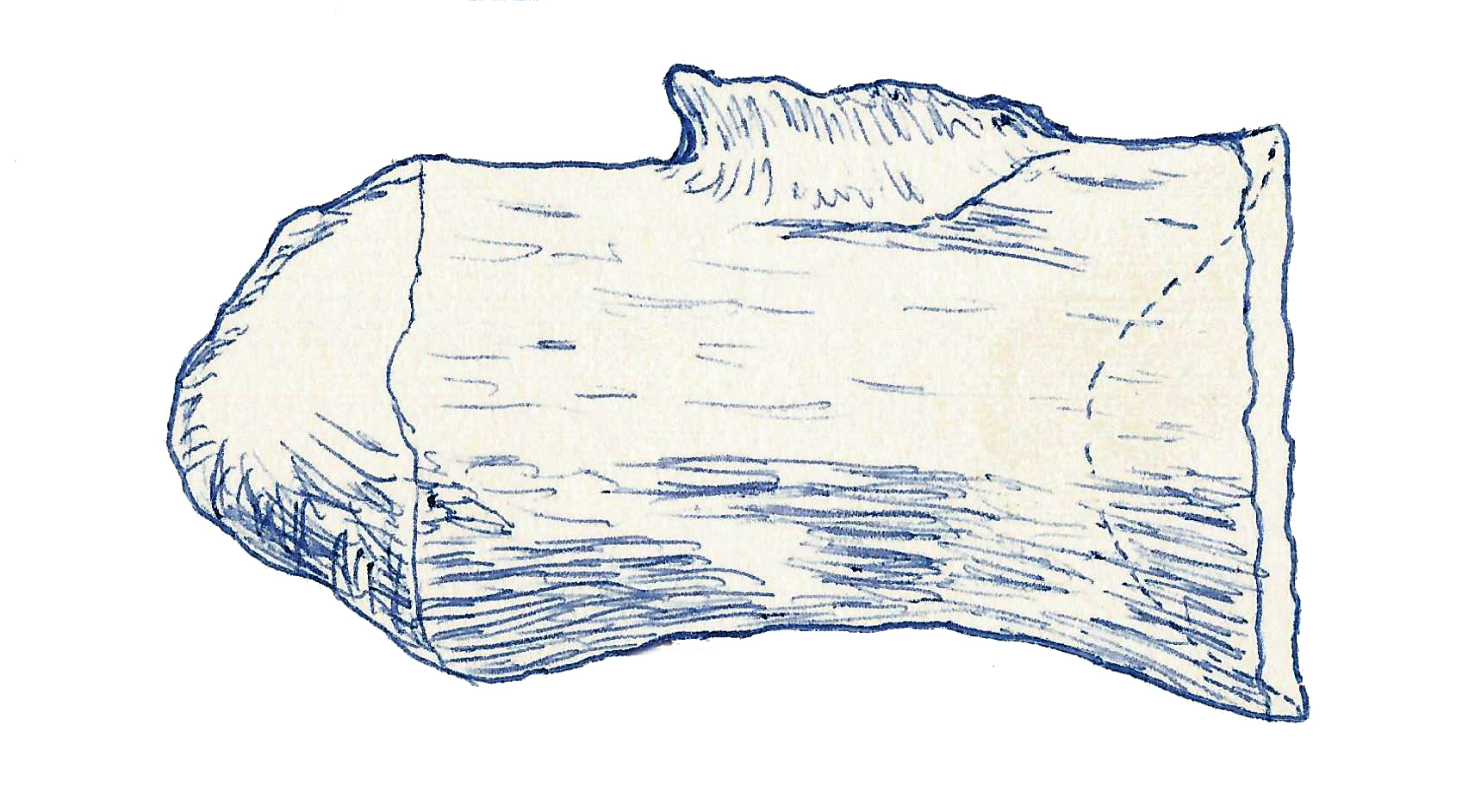
- Vertebra of M. semnus

Scientific classification
- Kingdom: Animalia
- Phylum: Chordata
- Class: Reptilia
- Clade: Dinosauria
- Clade: Saurischia
- Clade: †Sauropodomorpha
- Clade: †Sauropoda
- Clade: †Macronaria
- Clade: †Titanosauriformes
- Genus: †Macrurosaurus; Seeley, 1869

Type species
- †Macrurosaurus semnus Seeley, 1869

Other species
- †M. platypus? von Huene, 1956

Synonyms
- Acanthopholis platypus? Seeley, 1869

= Macrurosaurus =

Macrurosaurus Temporal range: late Albian, 105–100 Ma

Extinct genus of dinosaurs

Macrurosaurus (meaning "large-tailed lizard") is the name given to a genus of dinosaur from the Early Cretaceous. It was a titanosauriform which lived in what is now England. The type species, M. semnus, was named in 1876. A second species, M. platypus, may also exist.

== History ==
The genus Macrurosaurus was named by Harry Govier Seeley in 1869 in his index of fossils from the Cambridge Greensand. In 1876 Seeley more thoroughly described the type species, Macrurosaurus semnus, making the name valid. The generic name is derived from Greek makros, "large", and oura, "tail". The specific name is derived from Greek semnos, "stately" or "impressive". A second species, M. platypus, from the Chalk Group of England, may also exist. Seeley in 1869 named it as a species of the ankylosaurid Acanthopholis but Friedrich von Huene named it as a second species of Macrurosaurus in 1956. It is known from the specimen CAMSM B55454-55461. In 1999 Xabier Pereda-Superbiola and Paul M. Barrett reviewed all Acanthopholis material. They concluded that all species were nomina dubia whose syntype specimens were composites of non-diagnostic ankylosaur and ornithopod remains. For example, the metatarsals included in the syntype series of Acanthopholis platypus are from a sauropod, but the remaining syntypes are not.

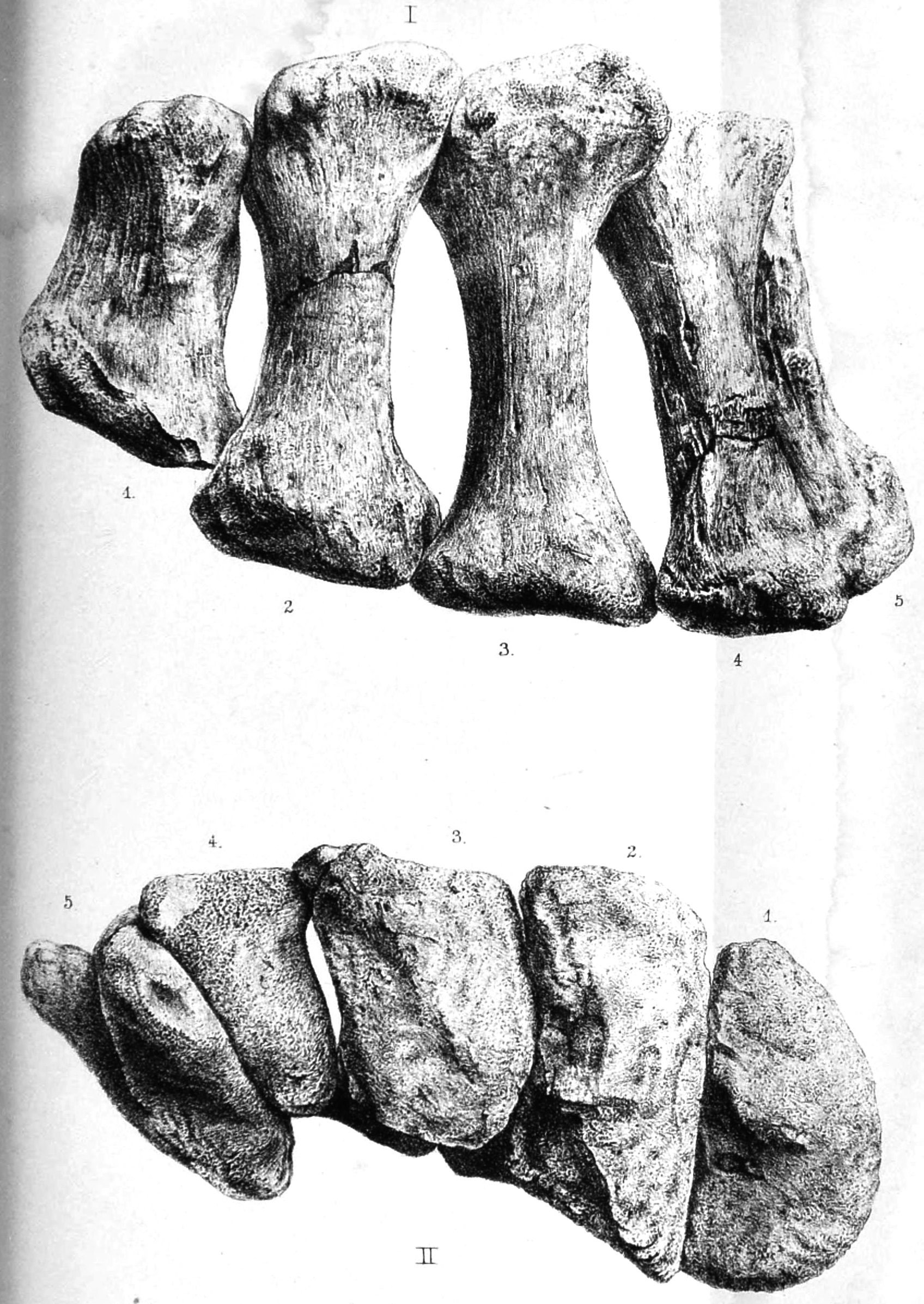
Metatarsals of M. platypus

The holotype of Macrurosaurus, SM B55630, consists of two series of caudal vertebrae found around 1864 near Cambridge, England in the Cambridge Greensand, strata themselves deposited during the Cenomanian but containing reworked fossil material dating perhaps from around the late Albian. The first was acquired by the Woodwardian Museum from William Farren who had it dug up at Coldhams Common near Barnwell. This series is made up of 25 proximal vertebrae. The second was found by Reverend W. Stokes-Shaw at a slightly more western location near Barton. It contained fifteen smaller distal vertebrae, from the tail end. Seeley, acting on the presumption that both finds belonged to the same species if not individual, combined the two series into one tail of about 4.5 metres length.

Other fragmentary fossils from England (Acanthopholis platypus), France and Argentina have later been referred to Macrurosaurus but the identity is today doubted.

A 2022 review considered Macrurosaurus to be an indeterminate macronarian, while "Acanthopholis" platypus was treated as indeterminate within Eusauropoda or Neosauropoda.

== Description ==
Macrurosaurus was by Seeley himself estimated to be about ten metres long. Often a length of around twelve metres (39 ft) is indicated in the popular literature. The vertebrae in front are procoelous, meaning that the vertebral centra are hollow at the front end and convex at the back. Those behind are amphicoelous: hollow at both ends. Seeley assumed that the full count of tail vertebrae would have been about fifty.

== Classification ==
Macrurosaurus was by Seeley assigned to the Dinosauria. Richard Lydekker in 1888 understood it belonged to the Sauropoda. In 1929 Friedrich von Huene referred it to the Titanosauridae. In recent years however, it has been commonly concluded that the species cannot be further determined than a more general Titanosauriformes. Also it is today often seen as a nomen dubium.
