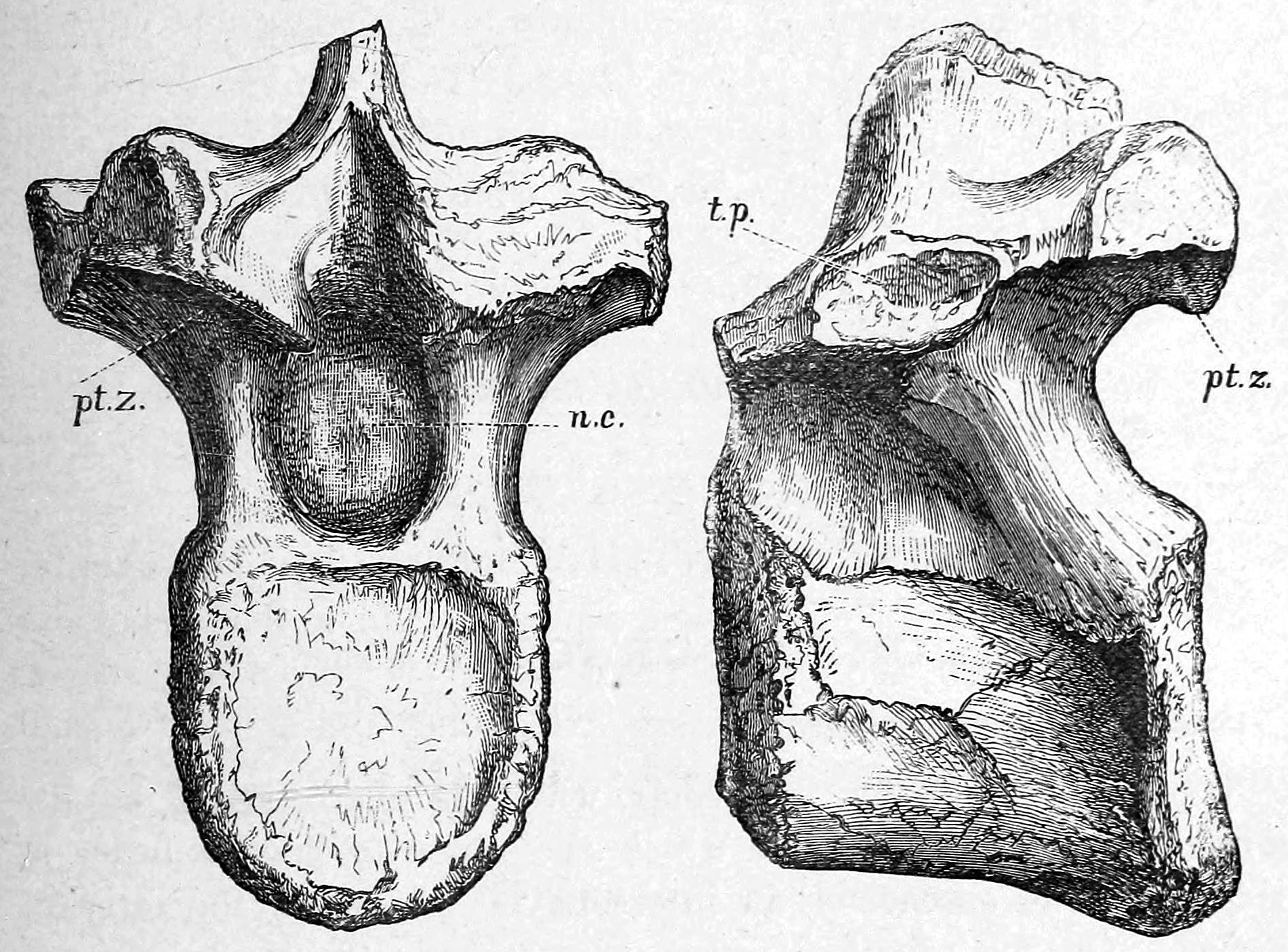
- Vertebra of S. macrocercus as seen from two different angles

Scientific classification
- Kingdom: Animalia
- Phylum: Chordata
- Class: Reptilia
- Clade: Dinosauria
- Clade: †Ornithischia
- Clade: †Ornithopoda
- Clade: †Iguanodontia
- Genus: †Syngonosaurus; Seeley, 1879
- Species: †S. macrocercus

Binomial name
- †Syngonosaurus macrocercus Seeley, 1879

Synonyms
- Acanthopholis macrocercus Seeley, 1869; Anoplosaurus macrocercus Kuhn, 1964; Sygmosaurus (sic); Sygnosaurus (sic)

= Syngonosaurus =

Syngonosaurus Temporal range: late Albian ~105–100 Ma

Extinct genus of ornithopod dinosaur

Syngonosaurus is an extinct genus of ornithopod dinosaur from the Early Cretaceous. It was an iguanodontian discovered in the Cambridge Greensand of England and was first described in 1879. The type species, S. macrocercus, was described by British paleontologist Harry Seeley in 1879 and it was later synonymised with Acanthopholis, but the genus was reinstated in a 2020 study, when Syngonosaurus and Eucercosaurus were reinterpreted as basal iguanodontians.

== Discovery and naming ==
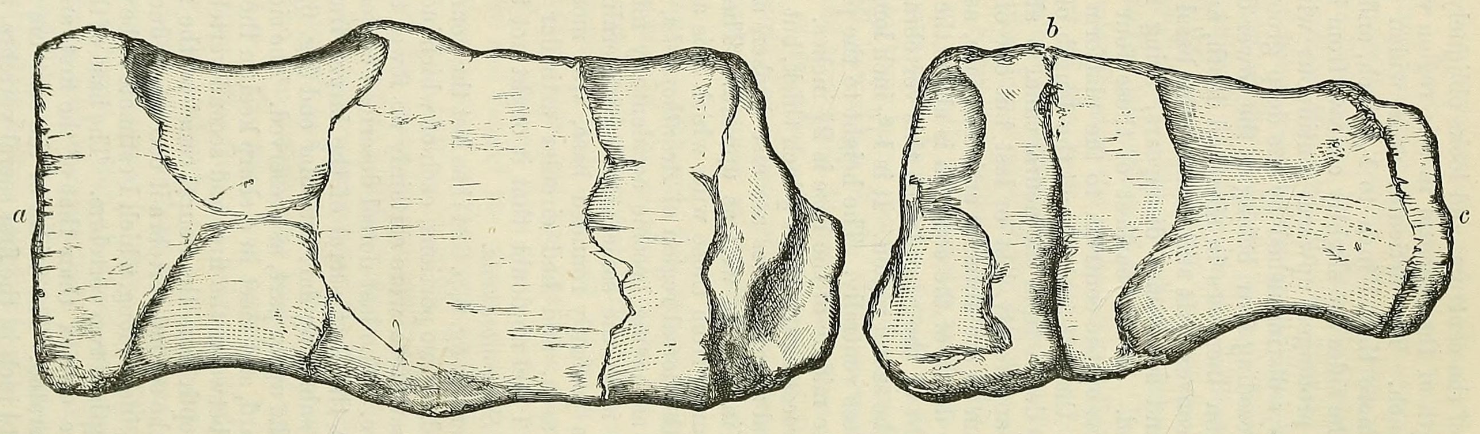
Sacral vertebra of S. macrocercus as seen from two different angles

In 1869 Harry Govier Seeley named several new species of Acanthopholis based on remains from the Cambridge Greensand, including A. macrocercus, based on specimens CAMSM B55570-55609.

In 1879 Seeley named the genus Syngonosaurus based on part of the type material of Acanthopholis macrocercus.

In 1999 Xabier Pereda-Superbiola and Paul M. Barrett reviewed all Acanthopholis material. They concluded that all species were nomina dubia whose syntype specimens were composites of non-diagnostic ankylosaur and ornithopod remains; including Syngonosaurus.

Syngonosaurus was synonymised with Acanthopholis in 1999, but the genus was reinstated in a 2020 study, when Syngonosaurus and Eucercosaurus were reinterpreted as basal iguanodontians.

== Classification ==
Syngonosaurus was seen as an ankylosaur in both a 2001 publication and a 2004 publication. In 2020, Syngonosaurus was classified into Iguanodontia.
