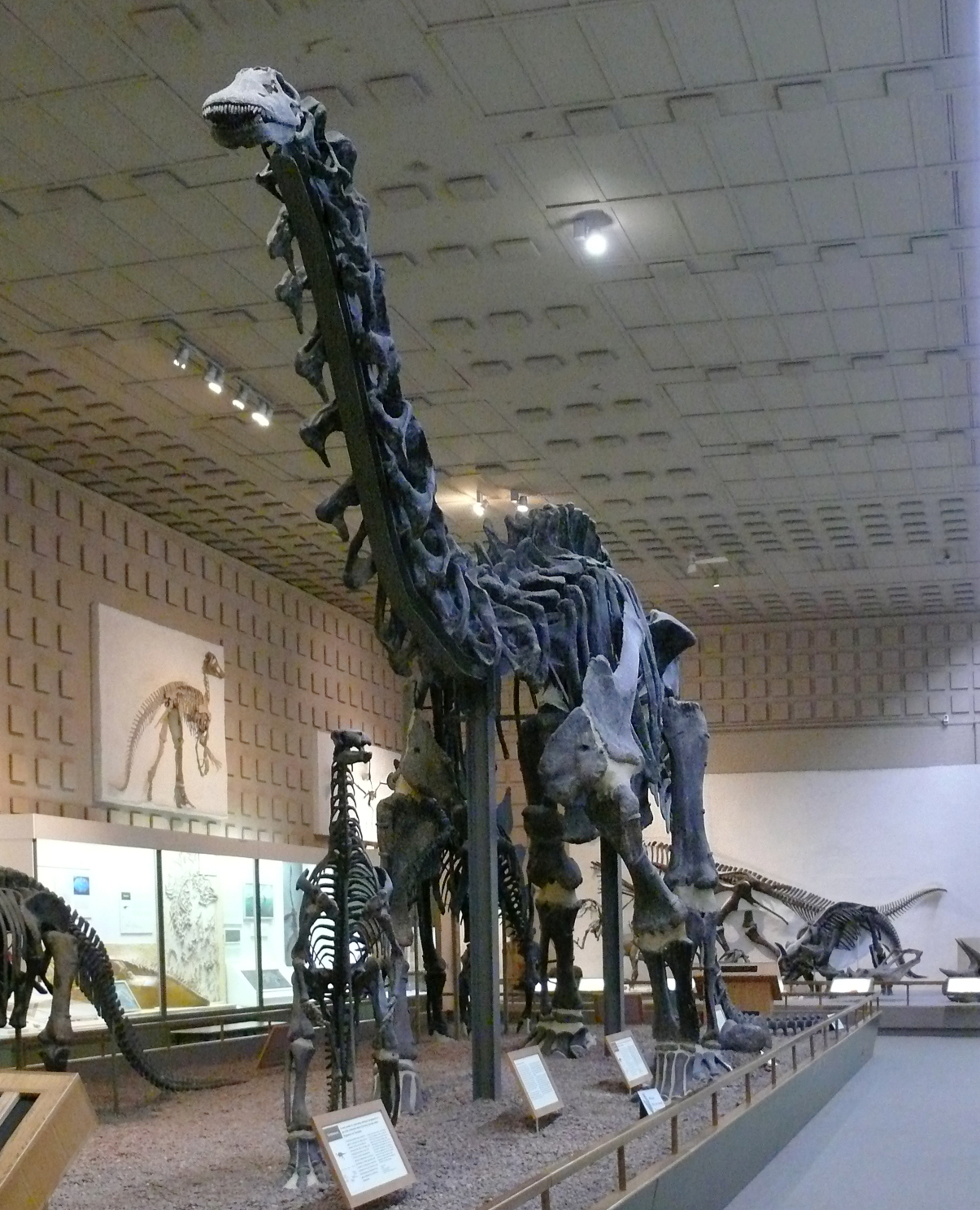
- Holotype specimen of Brontosaurus excelsus (YPM 1980), Peabody Museum of Natural History

Scientific classification
- Kingdom: Animalia
- Phylum: Chordata
- Class: Reptilia
- Clade: Dinosauria
- Superorder: †Phytodinosauria; Bakker, 1986

Subgroups
- †Sauropodomorpha; †Ornithischia

= Phytodinosauria =

Phytodinosauria Temporal range: Late Triassic–Late Cretaceous

Proposed clade of dinosaurs

Phytodinosauria is a group of dinosaurs proposed in 1986, combining the Sauropodomorpha and Ornithischia as sister groups, conceptualized as a superorder of herbivorous dinosaurs excluding the carnivorous Theropoda. This hypothesis has been weakly or not replicated in most subsequent research, in which studies either combine Theropoda and Sauropodomorpha within Saurischia or Theropoda and Ornithischia within Ornithoscelida.

== History ==
In 1888, Harry Govier Seeley divided the Dinosauria into two groups, the Saurischia and the Ornithischia, based on the structure of their pelvis. Since then, it became common to keep these groups separate, even to the extent of considering the Dinosauria to be polyphyletic, not forming a natural group but being just an informal name for unrelated large Archosauria.

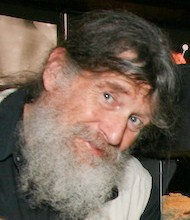
Phytodinosauria was coined by Robert T. Bakker.

In 1974 however, Robert "Bob" Bakker and Peter Malcolm Galton successfully defended the monophyly of the Dinosauria, arguing that the Saurischia and Ornithischia were real sister groups. While discussing this hypothesis in 1976, both Alan Jack Charig and José Fernando Bonaparte pointed out that the saurischian pelvic shape is not a valid diagnostic new trait or synapomorphy but a basal character inherited from reptilian ancestors or symplesiomorphy, which suggested the possibility that the two main saurischian groups, the Theropoda and Sauropodomorpha, are not closely related.

Bakker and Galton had based their analysis on a study of the basal sauropodomorph Anchisaurus, showing that it had many traits in common with the Ornithischia. Bakker now began to consider the possibility that, in view of the lack of proof for a close relationship between theropods and sauropodomorphs, the 1974 study indicated that Sauropodomorpha were more closely related to the ornithischian dinosaurs than to theropods. In 1986, Bakker openly proposed this in his book The Dinosaur Heresies:

Therefore all the plant-eating dinosaurs of every sort really constitute one, single, natural group branching out from one ancestor, a primitive anchisaurlike dinosaur. And a new name is required for this grand family of vegetarians. So I hereby christen them the Phytodinosauria, the "plant dinosaurs".

Both sauropodomorphs and ornithischians are characterized by their "blunt, spoon-crowned teeth suitable for cropping plants" and these would not be an instance of convergent evolution, both groups adapting to a herbivorous mode of living, but a sign they were descended from a plant-eating common ancestor. Bakker classified the Phytodinosauria as a superorder of mostly herbivorous dinosaurs within the Dinosauria.

Even before 1986, authors had combined the sauropodomorphs and ornithischians. Freelance researcher Gregory S. Paul in 1984 considered therizinosaurs — then known as "segnosaurs" — to be the "relics of the prosauropod-ornithischian transition". In his 1988 book Predatory Dinosaurs of the World: A Complete Illustrated Guide he repeated his hypothesis that therizinosaurs were late-surviving basal sauropodomorphs. In 1985, Michael Robert Cooper placed the sauropodomorphs and ornithischians in a cohort Ornithischiformes. This was based on two synapomorphies, regarding the shape and placement of the teeth.

Bonaparte, Bakker, and Paul argued that ornithischians were descended from basal sauropodomorphs, with segnosaurs being transitional taxa as depicted in the phylogeny below.

- Dinosauria
  - Theropoda
  - †Phytodinosauria
    - †Sauropodomorpha
    - - †Segnosauria
      - †Ornithischia

The Phytodinosauria hypothesis is not supported by current data: most phylogenies maintain a monophyletic Saurischia. In such a phylogeny therizinosaurs are maniraptoran dinosaurs more closely related to birds, and any similarity between sauropodomorphs and ornithischians is due to convergence. In 2017, an analysis did split the Saurischia but to the contrary proposed that it were the theropods that are more closely related to ornithischians, instead of the sauropodomorphs. However, in a series of additional phylogenetic analyses that were carried out by Parry, Baron and Vinther (2017), Phytodinosauria was recovered, but only when using certain optimality criteria and once certain modifications had been made to original morphological dataset of Baron, Norman and Barrett (2017). They recovered a polytomy showing herrerasaurs, Eodromaeus, Daemonosaurus, theropods, and a clade that includes Guaibasauridae and Phytodinosauria as shown below:

- Dinosauromorpha
  - †Marasuchus
  - unnamed
    - †Silesauridae
    - Dinosauria
      - †Herrerasauridae
      - †Eodromaeus
      - †Daemonosaurus
      - Theropoda
      - - †Guaibasauridae
        - †Phytodinosauria
          - †Ornithischia
          - †Sauropodomorpha

Dieudonné et al. (2026) also recovered Phytodinosauria, but cautioned that their results should be interpreted with caution and as preliminary, as few saurischians were included in the dataset. In their phylogenetic analysis they recovered the silesaurs (a group of herbivorous dinosauriforms that may or may not be an early group of ornithischians) as an evolutionary grade of early phytodinosaurs.

== See also ==
- Ornithoscelida
- Saurischia
