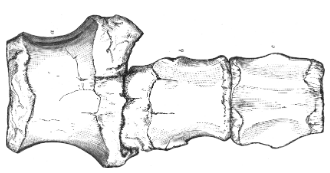
- Sacral vertebrae CAMSM 55614-16 from the holotype

Scientific classification
- Kingdom: Animalia
- Phylum: Chordata
- Class: Reptilia
- Clade: Dinosauria
- Clade: †Ornithischia
- Clade: †Ornithopoda
- Clade: †Iguanodontia
- Genus: †Eucercosaurus; Seeley, 1879
- Species: †E. tanyspondylus

Binomial name
- †Eucercosaurus tanyspondylus Seeley, 1879

Synonyms
- Anoplosaurus tanyspondylus (Seeley, 1879) Steel, 1969

= Eucercosaurus =

Eucercosaurus Temporal range: Early Cretaceous, late Albian

Extinct genus of dinosaurs

Eucercosaurus (meaning "good-tailed lizard") is the name given to a genus of ornithopod dinosaur from the Albian stage of the Early Cretaceous. It was an ornithopod discovered in the Cambridge Greensand of England and is known from 19 centra, 3 sacrals, 4 dorsals and 12 caudals, and a neural arch found near Trumpington, Cambridgeshire. The type species, E. tanyspondylus, was described by British paleontologist Harry Seeley in 1879.

It is considered a dubious name, and was once considered an ankylosaur. According to a 2020 study, Eucercosaurus and Syngonosaurus were basal iguanodontians.

== History and naming ==
Throughout the 1860s and 1870s, large collections of fossil vertebrate remains were made from the Cambridge Greensand for the Woodwardian Museum of Sedgwick Museum of Earth Sciences in Cambridge, first being described by British palaeontologist Harry Govier Seeley. Many of the 500 bones collected were found in association, allowing Seeley to establish which bones belonged to which individual, though much of the material was limited to vertebrae. One such associated series of vertebrae, found at Trumpington, was chosen by Seeley to represent a new taxon he described in 1879, given the name Eucercosaurus tanyspondylus. The specimen included 18 vertebral centra and one partial neural arch, with generally poor preservation and phosphate encrustations, as well as some wear and damage from picks used during excavation. The anatomy of Eucercosaurus, in particular the hexagonal cross-section of the vertebrae, was believed by Seeley to be unique to Eucercosaurus, and its general anatomy was found most similar to iguanodonts.

The mid-Cretaceous age of the Cambridge Greensand fossils is significant due to the rarity of deposits of that age in Europe, consisting of about 22% of the mid-Cretaceous tetrapod fossils in the world. The Cambridge Greensand is a member of the West Melbury Marly Chalk Formation, with the quarries being historic and now largely inaccessible. Eucercosaurus was collected from an unknown quarry near Trumpington as multiple were being worked at the time of its discovery by local quarrymen as they sieved and washed the phosphate nodules they were quarrying for. There are no maps or other records to verify the presence of Eucercosaurus as a single individual, but the consistency in preservation, size, and morphology supports their identification as such. The holotype of Eucercosaurus has since been designated as CAMSM B55610-29, with a unique number in the series for each of the 19 partial vertebrae. While the Cambridge Greensand sediments themselves are from the Cenomanian, the vertebrate remains including Eucercosaurus were reworked from the late Albian Gault Formation.

While Seeley considered Eucercosaurus to be an iguanodontian, he noted its similarities to Hylaeosaurus, leading to later discussion about a possibly ankylosaur identity. In 1969, British palaeontologist Rodney Steel opted to refer Eucercosaurus to the genus Anoplosaurus from the same deposits, creating the new combination Anoplosaurus tanyspondylus. Steel also referred Syngonosaurus, also from the Cambridge Greensand, to Anoplosaurus, uniting all Greensand ornithischians under one genus. While Steel considered Anoplosaurus to be an iguanodont, it has since been identified more confidently as an ankylosaur. Following this, Eucercosaurus has been considered distinct, an undiagnostic nomen dubium, or a synonym of the ankylosaur Acanthopholis, as either an ankylosaur or an iguanodontian. The status of Eucercosaurus was revisited in 2020 by British palaeontologists Paul Barrett and Joseph Bonsor, who found that its anatomy matched that of an iguanodontian, with its elongate, hexagonal vertebrae, and a ridge on the side, differing subtly from all other iguanodontians, but not enough to consider the taxon valid.
