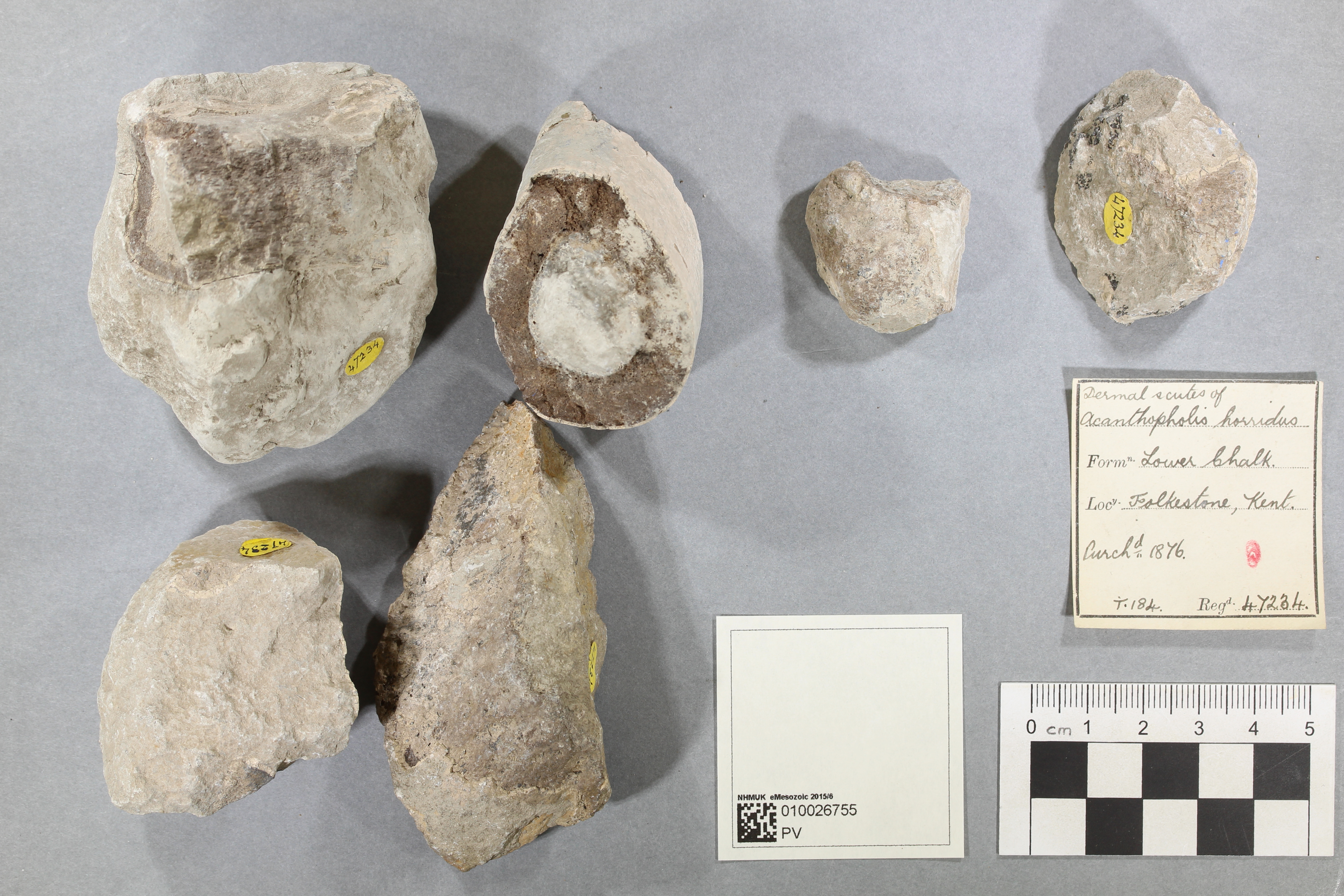
- Assigned dermal scutes

Scientific classification
- Kingdom: Animalia
- Phylum: Chordata
- Class: Reptilia
- Clade: Dinosauria
- Clade: †Ornithischia
- Clade: †Thyreophora
- Clade: †Ankylosauria
- Family: †Nodosauridae
- Subfamily: †Acanthopholinae; Nopcsa, 1923
- Genus: †Acanthopholis; Huxley, 1867
- Species: †A. horrida

Binomial name
- †Acanthopholis horrida Huxley, 1867

= Acanthopholis =

Acanthopholis Temporal range: Late Cretaceous, 97 Ma

Genus of reptiles (fossil)

Acanthopholis (/ˌækənˈθɒfoʊlɪs/; meaning "spiny scales") is a genus of ankylosaurian dinosaur in the family Nodosauridae that lived during the Late Cretaceous Period of England. A single species, A. horrida, exists.

== History ==
Around 1865, commercial fossil collector John Griffiths found some dinosaurian remains, including osteoderms, at the shoreline near Folkestone in Kent, which he sold to the metallurgist Dr. John Percy. Percy brought them to the attention of Thomas Henry Huxley, who paid Griffiths to dig up all fossils he could find at the site. Despite being hampered by the fact that it was located between the tidemarks, he managed to uncover several additional bones and parts of the body armour.

In 1867 Huxley named the genus and species Acanthopholis horridus. The dinosaur's generic name refers to its armour, being derived from Greek άκανθα akantha meaning 'spine' or 'thorn' and φόλις pholis meaning 'scale'. The specific name horridus means 'frightening' or 'rough' in Latin. Arthur Smith Woodward emended the species name to Acanthopholis horrida in 1890 because pholis is feminine.

The type specimens, cotypes GSM 109045-GSM 109058, were found in the Chalk Group, a formation itself dating to the Albian to Cenomanian stages around 100 million years ago. The specimens consist of three teeth, a basicranium, a dorsal vertebra, spikes and scutes.

In 1869 Harry Govier Seeley informally named several new species of the genus based on remains from the Cambridge Greensand: "Acanthopholis macrocercus", based on specimens CAMSM B55570-55609; "Acanthopholis platypus" (CAMSM B55454-55461); and "Acanthopholis stereocercus" (CAMSM B55558-55569). Seeley (1871) formally described Acanthopholis platypus as a new species, and in his 1876 description of the sauropod Macrurosaurus semnus he considered the metatarsals included in the A. platypus type material to be possibly conspecific with Macrurosaurus. Later, Seeley split the material of Acanthopholis stereocercus and based a new species of Anoplosaurus on part of it: Anoplosaurus major. He also described a new species, Acanthopholis eucercus, on the basis of six caudal vertebrae (CAMSM 55552-55557). In 1902, however, Franz Nopcsa changed it into another species of Acanthopholis: Acanthopholis major. Nopcsa at the same time renamed Anoplosaurus curtonotus into Acanthopholis curtonotus. In 1879 Seeley named the genus Syngonosaurus based on part of the type material of "A. macrocercus". In 1956 Friedrich von Huene renamed A. platypus into Macrurosaurus platypus.

In 1999 Xabier Pereda-Superbiola and Paul M. Barrett reviewed all Acanthopholis material. They concluded that all species were nomina dubia whose syntype specimens were composites of non-diagnostic ankylosaur and ornithopod remains. For example, the metatarsals included in the syntype series of Acanthopholis platypus are from a sauropod, but the remaining syntypes are not. They also found two previously unpublished names which Seeley had used to label museum specimens: "Acanthopholis hughesii" indicated SMC B55463-55490 and "Acanthopholis keepingi" SMC B55491-55526. Both names were not proposed by them as new species and are nomina nuda.

Syngonosaurus was synonymised with Acanthopholis in 1999, but the genus was reinstated in a 2020 study, when Syngonosaurus and Eucercosaurus were reinterpreted as basal iguanodontians.

A partial nodosaur skeleton from the Gault Formation in Kent, which had been scavenged by sharks shortly after the animal had died, was discovered and excavated between 2000–01 and it has been tentatively assigned to Acanthopholis. The specimen consists of osteoderms, vertebrae, parts of the sacrum and parts of the limbs and it is currently on loan from a private collection and is on display at the Maidstone Museum.

== Description ==
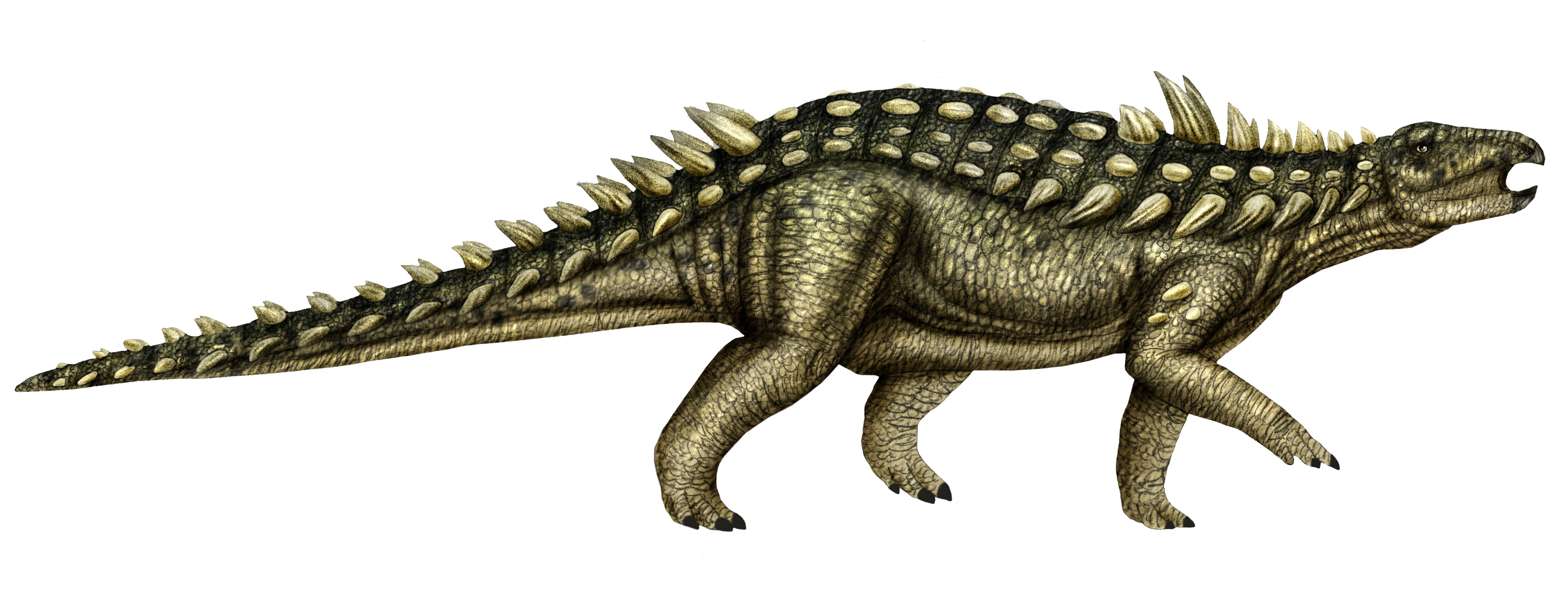
Hypothetical life restoration

The armour of Acanthopholis consisted of oval keeled plates set almost horizontally into the skin, with long spikes protruding from the neck and shoulder area, along the spine. Acanthopholis was quadrupedal and herbivorous. Its size has been estimated to be in the range of 3 to 5.5 meters (9.8 to 18.0 ft) long and approximately 380 kilograms (840 lb) in weight.

== Classification ==
Acanthopholis was originally assigned to the Scelidosauridae by Huxley. In 1902 Nopcsa created a separate family Acanthopholididae. Later, he named Acanthopholinae as a subfamily. In 1928, he corrected Acanthopholididae to Acanthopholidae. Today Acanthopholis is considered a member of the Nodosauridae within the Ankylosauria.

== See also ==
- Timeline of ankylosaur research
