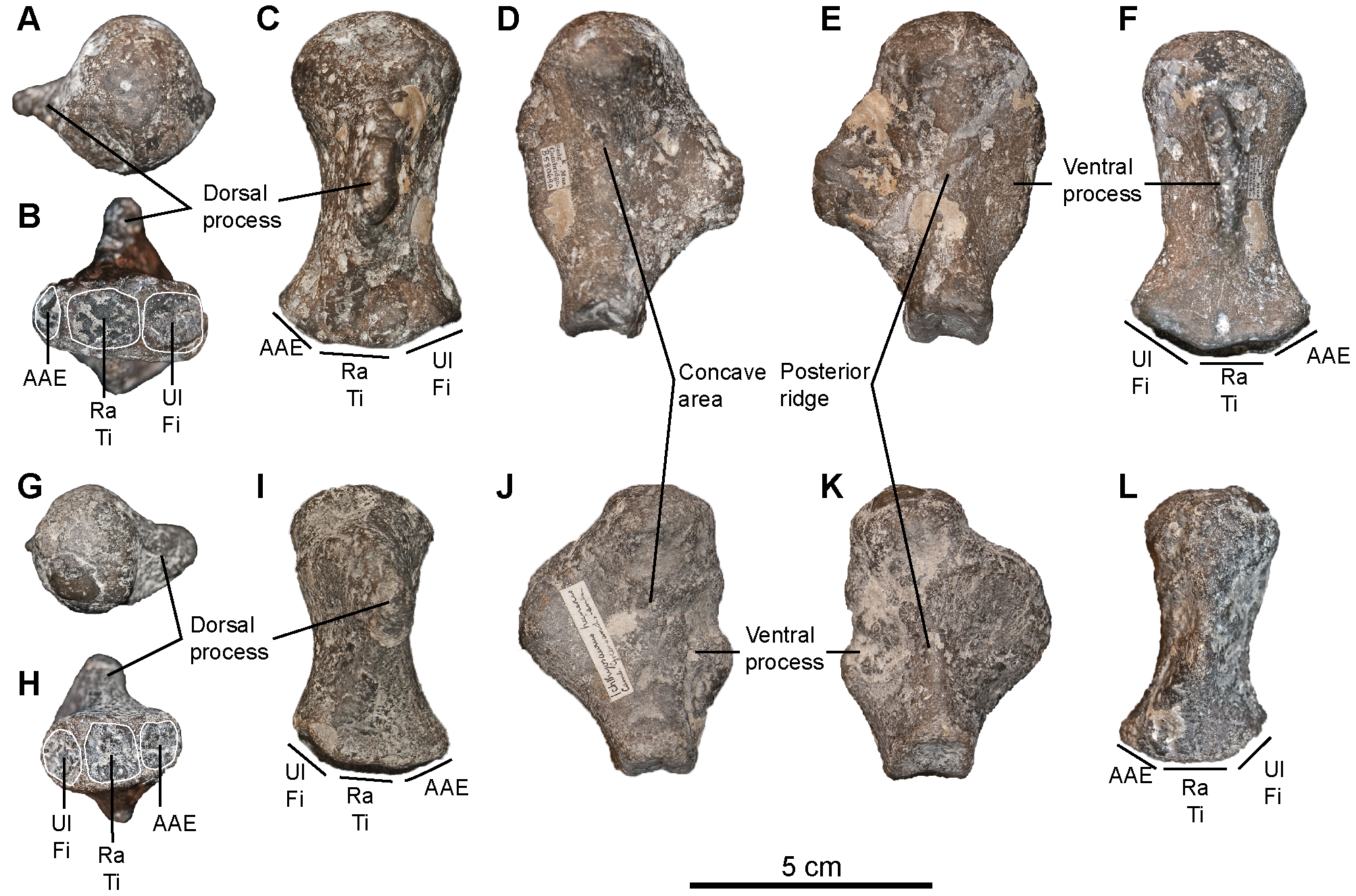
- Known material

Scientific classification
- Kingdom: Animalia
- Phylum: Chordata
- Class: Reptilia
- Superorder: †Ichthyopterygia
- Order: †Ichthyosauria
- Node: †Thunnosauria
- Genus: †Cetarthrosaurus; Seeley, 1873
- Species: †C. walkeri

Binomial name
- †Cetarthrosaurus walkeri Seeley, 1873

= Cetarthrosaurus =

Cetarthrosaurus Temporal range: Cretaceous, 99.6 Ma

Extinct genus of reptiles

Cetarthrosaurus is an extinct genus of ichthyosaur known from the eastern United Kingdom. It was collected from the Cambridge Greensand Formation, dating to late Albian or early Cenomanian stage, of the Early Cretaceous-Late Cretaceous boundary. Cetarthrosaurus was first named by Harry G. Seeley in 1873 and the type species is Cetarthrosaurus walkeri.
