= Patricosaurus =

Dubious genus of reptile

"Patricosaurus" (meaning "paternal lizard") is the name given to a dubious and chimeric genus of reptile from the Early Cretaceous. It is based on a femur and sacrum from two animals: the femur from a large lepidosaur, and the sacrum from an archosaur (Barrett and Evans, 2002), both specimens are known from the Cambridge Greensand. The type species, Patricosaurus merocratus, was described by Harry Seeley in 1887, and was originally thought to have been a lizard. The femur was estimated to be 8-10 cm long when complete, belonging to an animal with a vent-snout length of 0.8-0.9 metres and a maximum body length of two metres.
