= Dawsonia =

Dawsonia is the scientific name of several genera of organisms and may refer to:

- Dawsonia (plant), a genus of moss some reaching up to 65 cm (two feet) in length
- Dawsonia (trilobite), an eodiscoid trilobite
- Dawsonia (problematicum), a Palaeozoic problematicum
