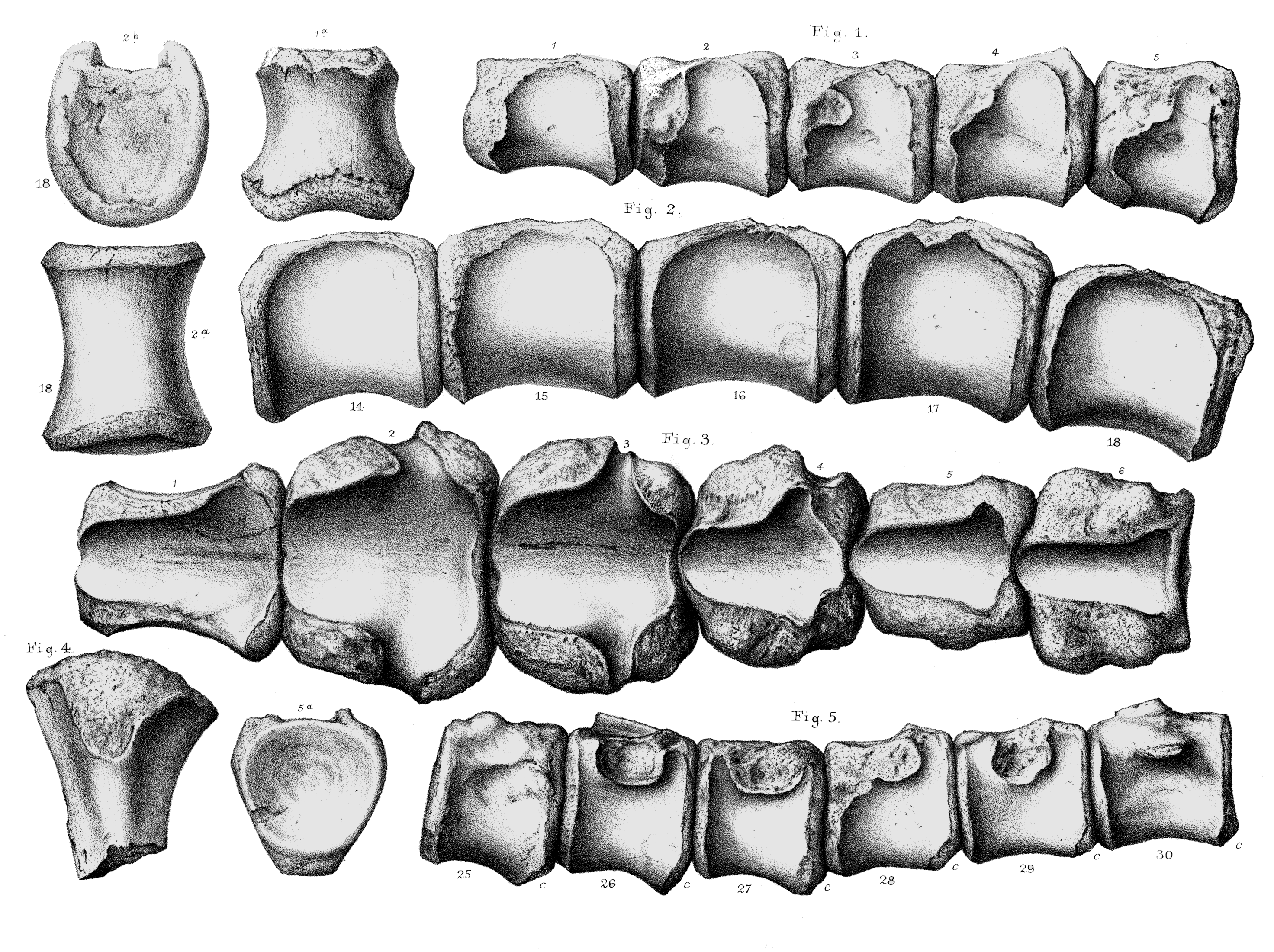
- Holotype vertebrae of A. curtonotus

Scientific classification
- Kingdom: Animalia
- Phylum: Chordata
- Class: Reptilia
- Clade: Dinosauria
- Clade: †Ornithischia
- Clade: †Thyreophora
- Clade: †Ankylosauria
- Clade: †Euankylosauria
- Family: †Nodosauridae
- Genus: †Anoplosaurus

Type species
- †Anoplosaurus curtonotus Seeley, 1879

= Anoplosaurus =

Anoplosaurus Temporal range: late Albian, 100 Ma

Extinct genus of dinosaurs

Anoplosaurus (meaning "unarmored or unarmed lizard") is an extinct genus of herbivorous nodosaurid dinosaur from the Lower Cretaceous (late Albian age) Cambridge Greensand of Cambridgeshire, England. It has in the past been classified with either the armored dinosaurs or the ornithopods, but current thought has been in agreement with the "armored dinosaur" interpretation, placing it in the Ankylosauria.

== History ==
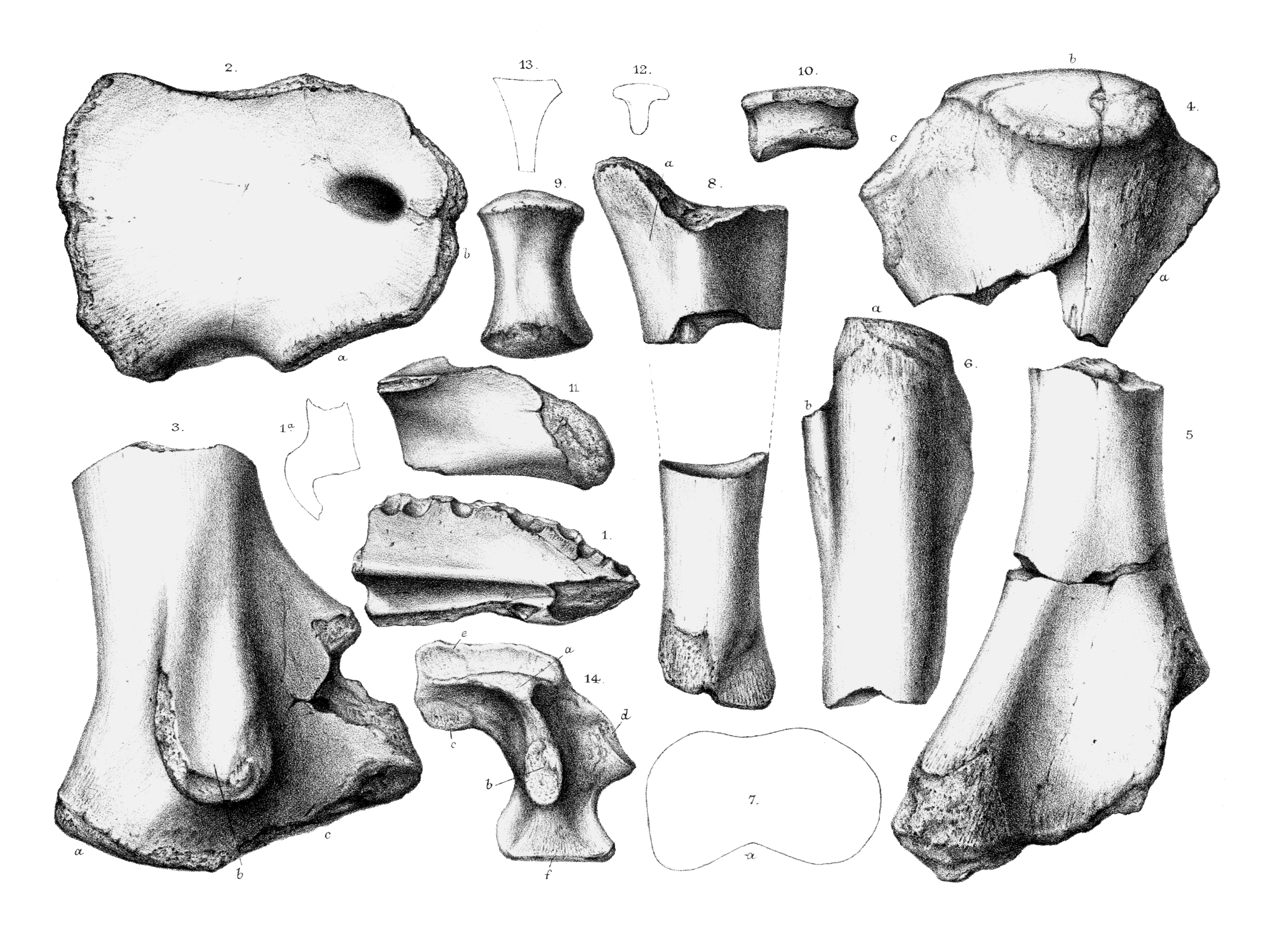
Illustration of the holotype fossil elements.

Harry Govier Seeley named this genus in 1879 for a disarticulated partial postcranial skeleton that had been uncovered no later than 1878 at Reach, Cambridgeshire, composed of a left dentary fragment, numerous vertebrae from the neck, back, and sacrum, parts of the pectoral girdle, humerus fragments, part of the left femur, left tibia, foot bones, ribs, and other fragments. He regarded it as possibly juvenile, due to its small size, with a length of about five feet. The type species is Anoplosaurus curtonotus. The generic name, derived from the Greek hoplo~, a word element used in combinations, with the meaning of "armed", refers to the fact no armour plates had been discovered. The specific name is derived from Latin curtus, "short", and Greek νῶτον, noton, "back".

A second species, Anoplosaurus major, "the larger one", was named by Seeley in 1879 for a neck vertebra and three partial caudal vertebrae he removed from the material previously referred to Acanthopholis stereocercus, from the same formation as the type species. This species now appears to be chimeric, the neck vertebra coming from an ankylosaur, the caudals from an indeterminate iguanodont.

Although Seeley assigned Anoplosaurus to a general Dinosauria, he understood its possible affinities with Scelidosaurus or Polacanthus, as shown by the genus name, and other workers began to see it as an armored dinosaur. In 1902, Baron Franz Nopcsa referred both species to Acanthopholis, creating a Acanthopholis curtonotus and a Acanthopholis major. In 1923 Nopcsa suggested that, while some of the remains belonged to Acanthopholis, other remains, which he removed from that genus, belonged to a camptosaurid. This suggestion led to considerable confusion, with some authors beginning to classify Anoplosaurus under the Camptosauridae, a practice that was continued over several decades (with modifications as iguanodontian taxonomy changed over the years).

In 1964, Oskar Kuhn renamed Syngonosaurus macrocercus Seeley 1879 into Anoplosaurus macrocercus. In 1969, Rodney Steel renamed Eucercosaurus tanyspondylus Seeley 1879 into Anoplosaurus tanyspondylus. Both Syngonosaurus and Eucercosaurus are today seen as nomina dubia and these last two Anoplosaurus species are hereby equally invalid.

In 1998, Xabier Pereda-Suberbiola and Paul Barrett reexamined the material of Anoplosaurus curtonotus. They wrote that it all belonged to a "primitive" or basal member of the Nodosauridae, the lack of armor possibly due to the young age of the animal at death. The basal position would be indicated by the long tooth row and the low sacral vertebrae count. Seeley had never indicated a holotype among the syntype series. Pereda-Superbiola & Barrett therefore selected specimen SMC B55731, a right scapula piece, as the lectotype. Its ankylosaurian affinities would be proven by a high acromion process. The other nodosaurid fossils found at Reach, specimens SMC B55670 - 55742, were assigned as paralectotypes. Pereda-Superbiola & Barrett considered it possible that the discovery had in fact not been made in the Cambridge Green Sand but in the, also Albian, Upper Gault Clay, because the skeletal elements seemed to have belonged to a single individual which might preclude a provenance from the very reworked marine Green Sand deposits. Anoplosaurus curtonotus was by them considered a possibly valid taxon. Reviews since then have followed this interpretation of the genus as an armored dinosaur belonging to the Ankylosauria.

== Palaeobiology ==
As a possible nodosaurid, Anoplosaurus would have been a quadrupedal, low-slung herbivore, with armour on its body for protection.

== See also ==
- Timeline of ankylosaur research
