= Montana Group =

- Stratigraphic range: Cretaceous
- Type: Group

Location
- Region: South Dakota and Montana
- Country: United States

The Montana Group is a geologic group located in South Dakota and Montana. It preserves fossils dating back to the Cretaceous period.

== See also ==
- List of fossiliferous stratigraphic units in South Dakota
- Paleontology in South Dakota
