= Cambridge Greensand =

Geological unit in England

- Stratigraphic range: Earliest Cenomanian ~100 Ma
- Type: Member
- Unit of: West Melbury Marly Chalk Formation
- Underlies: Chalk Group
- Overlies: Gault Formation
- Thickness: 0.1–1 m (0.33–3.28 ft)

Lithology
- Primary: Glauconitic marl
- Other: Phosphorite

Location
- Coordinates: 52.2°N 0.1°E
- Approximate paleocoordinates: 41.0°N 1.8°E
- Region: England
- Country: United Kingdom
- Extent: North Hertfordshire and Cambridgeshire

Type section
- Named for: Cambridge
- Location: Arlesey Brickpit
- Cambridge Greensand (England)

The Cambridge Greensand is a geological unit in England whose strata are earliest Cenomanian in age. It lies above the erosive contact between the Gault Formation and the Chalk Group in the vicinity of Cambridgeshire, and technically forms the lowest member bed of the West Melbury Marly Chalk Formation. It is a remanié deposit, containing reworked fossils of late Albian age, including those of dinosaurs and pterosaurs.

== Description ==
The lithology is made out of glauconitic marl, described as a "chalk mud", containing abundant ostracod, coccolith and foram remains, with a concentration of phosphatic nodules and bones at the base.

== Vertebrate paleofauna ==
Color key
Taxon	Reclassified taxon	Taxon falsely reported as present	Dubious taxon or junior synonym	Ichnotaxon	Ootaxon	Morphotaxon

Notes
Uncertain or tentative taxa are in small text; ~~crossed out~~ taxa are discredited.

=== Birds ===
Birds
Genus	Species	Locality	Material	Notes	Images
Enaliornis	E. barrette		Braincases, vertebrae, pelvis [and] limb elements	This genus is the oldest known hesperornithine	
Enaliornis	E sedgwicki		Hindlimb elements	This genus is the oldest known hesperornithine	
Enaliornis	E. seeleyi		Assorted cranial and postcranial elements	This genus is the oldest known hesperornithine	

=== Dinosaurs ===
==== Ornithischians ====
Ornithischians
Genus	Species	Locality	Material	Notes	Images
Anoplosaurus	A. curtonotus		"Partial postcranium"		
Anoplosaurus	A. major		"Cervical vertebrae." "Vertebrae."		
Acanthopholis	A. eucercus		"[Two] caudal centra."	Nomen dubium	
Acanthopholis	A. platypus		"Phalanx, caudal centra."	Nomen dubium	
Acanthopholis	A. macrocercus		"Osteoderms." "Vertebrae, fragmentary skeleton elements."	Reassigned to Syngonosaurus	
Acanthopholis	A. stereocercus		"Osteoderms." "Vertebrae."	Nomen dubium	
Eucercosaurus	E. tanyspondylus		"Vertebrae."		
Trachodon	T. cantabrigiensis		"Dentary tooth."	Nomen dubium	

==== Saurischians ====
Saurischians
Genus	Species	Locality	Material	Notes	Images
Macrurosaurus	M. semnus		"Caudal vertebrae"	Titanosauriform sauropod or indeterminate macronarian	

=== Pterosaurs ===
Pterosaurs
Genus	Species	Locality	Material	Notes	Images
Aerodraco	A. sedgwickii		Anterior rostrum		
Amblydectes	A. crassidens		Jaw fragments		
Amblydectes	A. eurygnathus		Jaw fragments	Possibly a junior synonym of A. crassidens	
Camposipterus	C. colorhinus		Anterior rostra fragments		
Camposipterus	C. nasutus		Partial rostrum		
Draigwenia	D. platystomus		Anterior rostrum fragments	Formerly Amblydectes platystomus	
Hintighernia	H. edingerae		Cranial fragment		
Lonchodraco	L. machaerorhynchus			May or may not be referrable to Ikrandraco	
Lonchodraco	L. microdon			Junior synonym of L. machaerorhynchus	
Nicorhynchus	N. capito		Jaw fragments	Possibly synonymous with Coloborhynchus	
Ornithocheirus	O. simus				
Ornithocheirus	"Ornithocheirus" denticulatus				
Ornithocheirus	"Ornithocheirus" polyodon				
Ornithostoma	O. sedgwicki		Jaw fragments	Azhdarchoid pterosaur	
Indeterminate azhdarchoid			Jaw fragments	Likely represents a distinct taxon from Ornithostoma	
Indeterminate tapejarid			Rostrum tip, cervival vertebrae and partial humerus	Rostrum tip might be referrable to the Sinopterinae	

=== Ichthyosaurs ===
Ichthyosaurs
Genus	Species	Locality	Material	Notes	Images
Cetarthrosaurus	C. walkeri				
Maiaspondylus	M. cantabrigiensis				
Pervushovisaurus	P. campylodon				
Sisteronia	S. seeleyi				

=== Lepidosauria ===
Lepidosauria
Genus	Species	Locality	Material	Notes	Images
Patricosaurus	P. merocratus			Chimeric specimen	

== Invertebrates ==
=== Ammonites ===
- Salaziceras salazacense

== See also ==
- List of dinosaur-bearing rock formations
