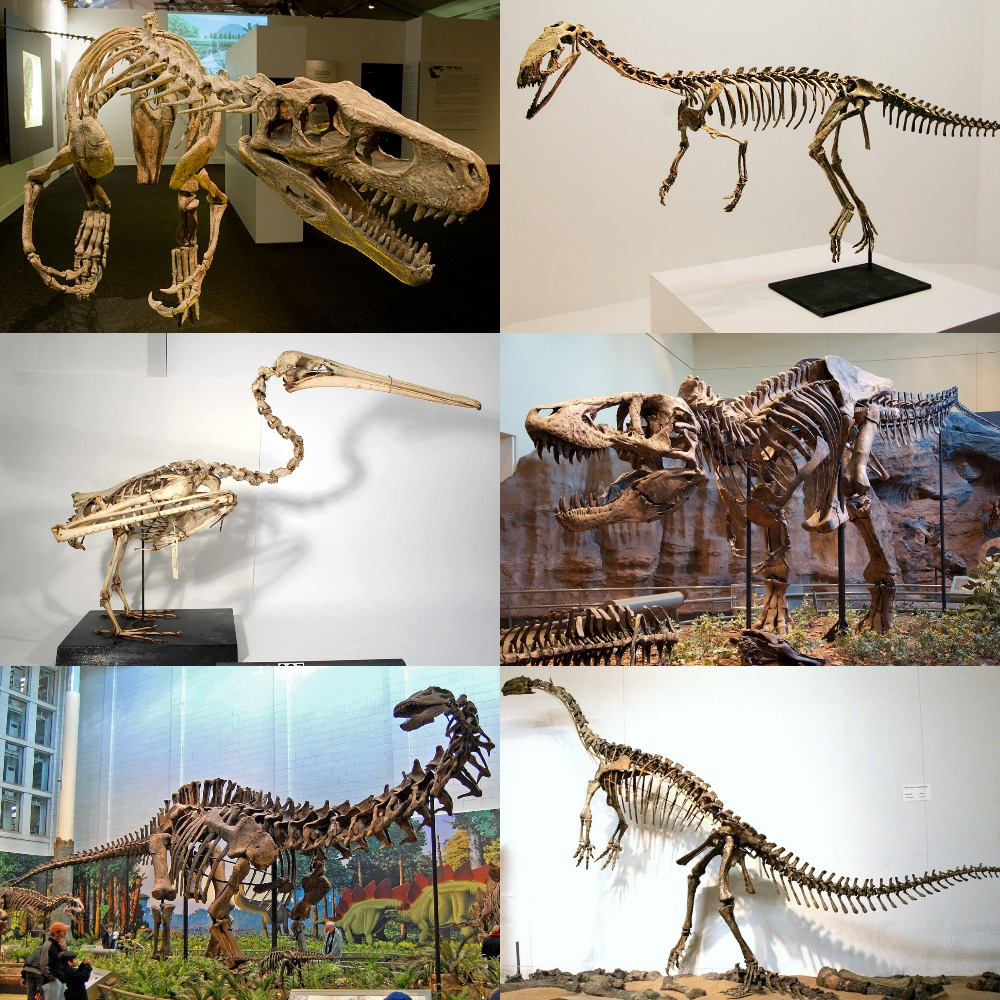
- Montage of six different representatives of saurischian dinosaurs. 1st row (early saurischians): Herrerasaurus ischigualastensis (herrerasaur), Eodromaeus murphi (basal theropod); 2nd row (theropods): Brown pelican, Tyrannosaurus rex; 3rd row (sauropodomorphs): Apatosaurus louisae, Plateosaurus trossingensis.

Scientific classification
- Kingdom: Animalia
- Phylum: Chordata
- Class: Reptilia
- Clade: Dinosauria
- Clade: Saurischia; Seeley, 1888

Subgroups
- †Herrerasauria
- Eusaurischia Padian et al., 1999
  - †Sauropodomorpha
  - Theropoda
Saurischians of
uncertain affinity
- †Alwalkeria
- †Eodromaeus
- †Saltopus?
- †Saurophaganax

= Saurischia =

Saurischians Temporal range: Late Triassic – Present, 233.23–0 Ma Possible Middle Triassic record

Clade of dinosaurs

Saurischia (/sɔːˈrɪskiə/ saw-RIS-kee-ə, meaning "reptile-hipped" from the Greek sauros (σαῦρος) meaning 'lizard' and ischion (ἴσχιον) meaning 'hip joint') is one of the two basic divisions of dinosaurs (the other being Ornithischia), classified by their hip structure. Saurischia and Ornithischia were originally called orders by Harry Seeley in 1888, though today most paleontologists classify Saurischia as an unranked clade rather than an order.

== Description ==
All carnivorous dinosaurs (certain types of theropods) are traditionally classified as saurischians, as are all of the birds and one of the two primary lineages of herbivorous dinosaurs, the sauropodomorphs. At the end of the Cretaceous Period, all saurischians except birds became extinct in the course of the Cretaceous–Paleogene extinction event. Birds, as a group of maniraptoran theropod dinosaurs, are a sub-clade of saurischian dinosaurs in phylogenetic classification.

Saurischian dinosaurs are traditionally distinguished from ornithischian dinosaurs by their three-pronged pelvic structure, with the pubis pointed forward. The ornithischians' pelvis is arranged with the pubis rotated backward, parallel with the ischium, often also with a forward-pointing process, giving a four-pronged structure. The saurischian hip structure led Seeley to name them "lizard-hipped" dinosaurs, because they retained the ancestral hip anatomy also found in modern lizards and other reptiles. He named ornithischians "bird-hipped" dinosaurs because their hip arrangement was superficially similar to that of birds, though he did not propose any specific relationship between ornithischians and birds. However, in the view which has long been held, this "bird-hipped" arrangement evolved several times independently in dinosaurs, first in the ornithischians, then in the lineage of saurischians including birds (Avialae), and lastly in the therizinosaurians. This would then be an example of convergent evolution: avialans, therizinosaurians, and ornithischian dinosaurs all developed a similar hip anatomy independently of each other, possibly as an adaptation to their herbivorous or omnivorous diets.

== Classification ==
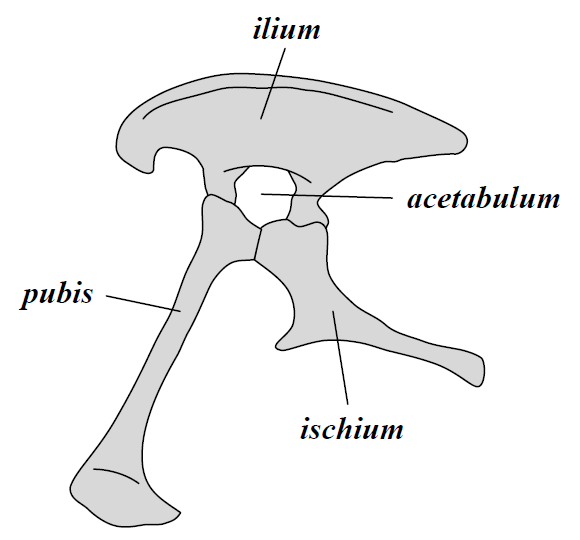
Saurischian pelvis structure (left side)

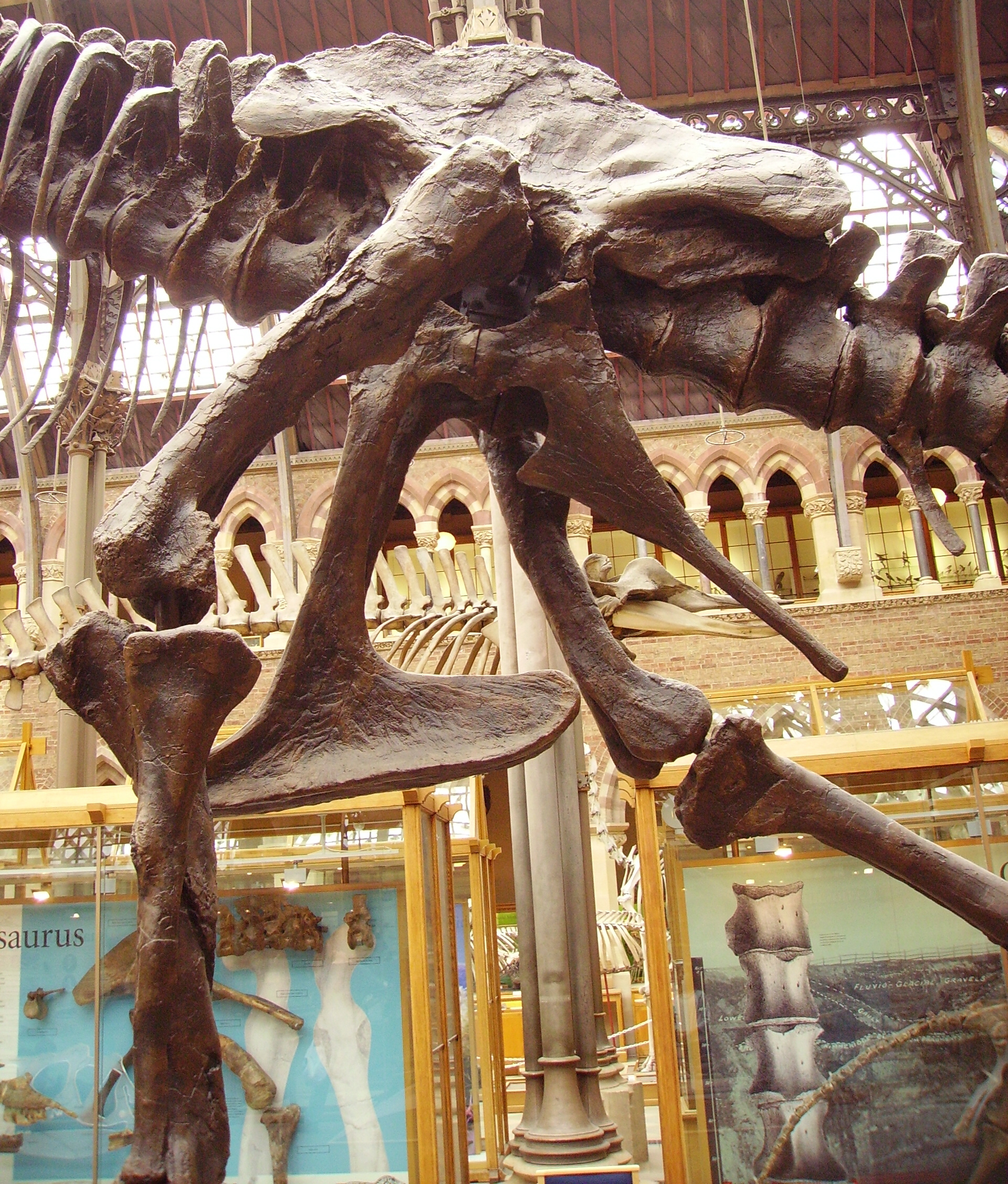
Tyrannosaurus pelvis (showing saurischian structure – left side)
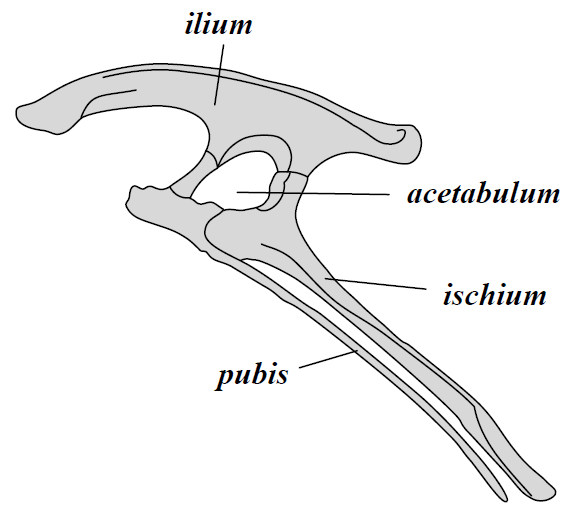
Ornithischian pelvis structure (left side)

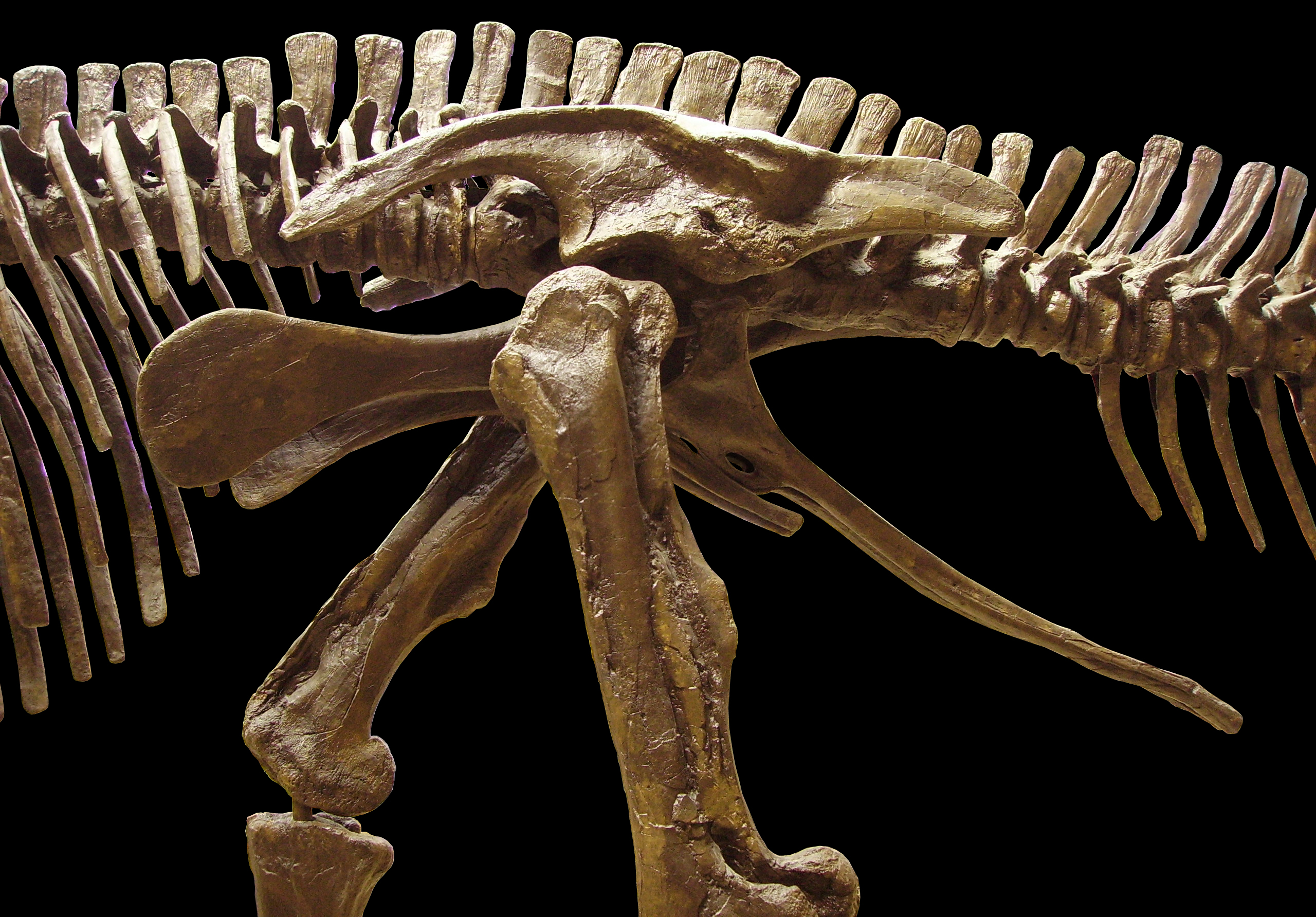
Edmontosaurus pelvis (showing ornithischian structure – left side)

In his paper naming the two groups, Seeley reviewed previous classification schemes put forth by other paleontologists to divide up the traditional order Dinosauria. He preferred one that had been put forward by Othniel Charles Marsh in 1878, which divided dinosaurs into four orders: Sauropoda, Theropoda, Ornithopoda, and Stegosauria (these names are still used today in much the same way to refer to suborders or clades within Saurischia and Ornithischia).

Seeley, however, wanted to formulate a classification that would take into account a single primary difference between major dinosaurian groups based on a characteristic that also differentiated them from other reptiles. He found this in the configuration of the hip bones, and found that all four of Marsh's orders could be divided neatly into two major groups based on this feature. He placed the Stegosauria and Ornithopoda in the Ornithischia, and the Theropoda and Sauropoda in the Saurischia. Furthermore, Seeley used this major difference in the hip bones, along with many other noted differences between the two groups, to argue that "dinosaurs" were not a natural grouping at all, but rather two distinct orders that had arisen independently from more primitive archosaurs. This concept that "dinosaur" was an outdated term for two distinct orders lasted many decades in the scientific and popular literature, and it was not until the 1960s that scientists began to again consider the possibility that saurischians and ornithischians were more closely related to each other than they were to other archosaurs.

Although his concept of a polyphyletic Dinosauria is no longer accepted by most paleontologists, Seeley's basic division of the two dinosaurian groups has stood the test of time, and has been supported by modern cladistic analysis of relationships among dinosaurs. A node-base clade, Eusaurischia, was named for the least inclusive group containing sauropodomorphs (represented by Cetiosaurus) and theropods (represented by Neornithes). Any saurischian that diverged before the theropod-sauropodomorph split is therefore outside clade Eusaurischia.

One alternative hypothesis challenging Seeley's classification was proposed by Robert T. Bakker in his 1986 book The Dinosaur Heresies. Bakker's classification separated the theropods into their own group and placed the two groups of herbivorous dinosaurs (the sauropodomorphs and ornithischians) together in a separate group he named the Phytodinosauria ("plant dinosaurs"). The Phytodinosauria hypothesis was based partly on the supposed link between ornithischians and prosauropods, and the idea that the former had evolved directly from the latter, possibly by way of an enigmatic family that seemed to possess characters of both groups, the segnosaurs. However, it was later found that segnosaurs were an unusual type of herbivorous theropod saurischian closely related to birds, and the Phytodinosauria hypothesis fell out of favor.

A 2017 study by Matthew Grant Baron, David B. Norman and Paul M. Barrett did not find support for a monophyletic Saurischia, according to its traditional definition. Instead, the group was found to be paraphyletic. As a solution, Theropoda was removed from the group and placed as the sister group to the Ornithischia in the newly defined clade Ornithoscelida. As another result, the authors redefined Saurischia as "the most inclusive clade that contains Diplodocus carnegii, but not Triceratops horridus, resulting in a clade containing only the Sauropodomorpha and Herrerasauridae. Thomas Holtz (2017) recommended using the name Sauropodomorpha to refer to a possible clade that includes traditional sauropodomorphs and herrerasaurids; alternatively, he proposed redefining the long-disused taxon Pachypodosauria to include Sauropodomorpha and Herrerasauridae as subclades. Cau (2018) also supported Ornithoscelida but placed herrerasaurids, Tawa and Daemonosaurus in a clade (Herrerasauria) outside Dinosauria. Other recent studies support a view closer to the traditional Saurischia hypothesis, with theropods closer to sauropodomorphs than to ornithischians. Novas et al. (2021) support Cau's herrerasaur phylogeny but place this clade in Saurischia.

Phylogenetic position of saurischians in different topologies
Müller & Garcia, 2020	Novas et al., 2021
Dinosauria; †Ornithischia (incl. "Silesauridae"); Saurischia; †Herrerasauridae; - †Daemonosaurus; - - †Chindesaurus; †Tawa; - - †Saltopus; †Eodromaeus; Eusaurischia; †Sauropodomorpha; Theropoda	Dracohors; †Silesauridae; Dinosauria; †Ornithischia; Saurischia; †Herrerasauria; †Herrerasauridae; - †Daemonosaurus; †Chindesaurus; †Tawa; Eusaurischia; †Sauropodomorpha; Theropoda; †Eodromaeus; Neotheropoda
Ornithoscelida hypothesis. Taxa traditionally classified as saurischians are highlighted in green.
Baron et al., 2017	Cau, 2018
Dracohors; †Silesauridae; Dinosauria; †Saurischia (=Sauropodomorpha; =Pachypodosauria); †Herrerasauridae; †Sauropodomorpha; Ornithoscelida; †Ornithischia; Theropoda	Dracohors; † Silesauridae (incl. Pisanosaurus); - †Herrerasauria; †Herrerasauridae; - †Daemonosaurus; †Tawa; Dinosauria; †Sauropodomorpha; - † Eodromaeus; Ornithoscelida; †Ornithischia; Theropoda

== See also ==
- Ornithoscelida
- Phytodinosauria
