= Dawsonia campanulata =

Dawsonia campanulata Temporal range: Silurian

Scientific classification
- Domain: Eukaryota
- Kingdom: Animalia
- Phylum: incertae sedis
- Class: incertae sedis
- Order: incertae sedis
- Family: incertae sedis
- Genus: †Dawsonia; Nicholson, 1873
- Species: †D. campanulata

Binomial name
- †Dawsonia campanulata Nicholson, 1873

Species of prehistoric organism

Dawsonia campanulata is an organic-walled Palaeozoic organism of unknown affinity. It resembles a shell or purse.
