= Paul Barrett (palaeobiologist) =

British paleontologist

Paul Michael Barrett is a British vertebrate paleontologist at the Natural History Museum in London. His work primarily focuses on dinosaurs. The extinct dinosaur Vectipelta barretti is named in his honour.

== Biography ==
After undergraduate and doctoral studies at the University of Cambridge, Paul Barrett became Junior Research Fellow, Trinity College, Cambridge from 1996-1999, then Departmental Lecturer in Animal Diversity at the Department of Zoology, University of Oxford from 1999-2003. He joined the Natural History Museum, London in 2012, becoming a Merit Researcher in 2012

He has more than 400 publications mentioned on Google Scholar.

== Awards ==
Barrett was presented with the President's medal of the Palaeontological Association in 2016 and the Bicentenary Medal of the Linnean Society in 2011.
