= 1959 in science =

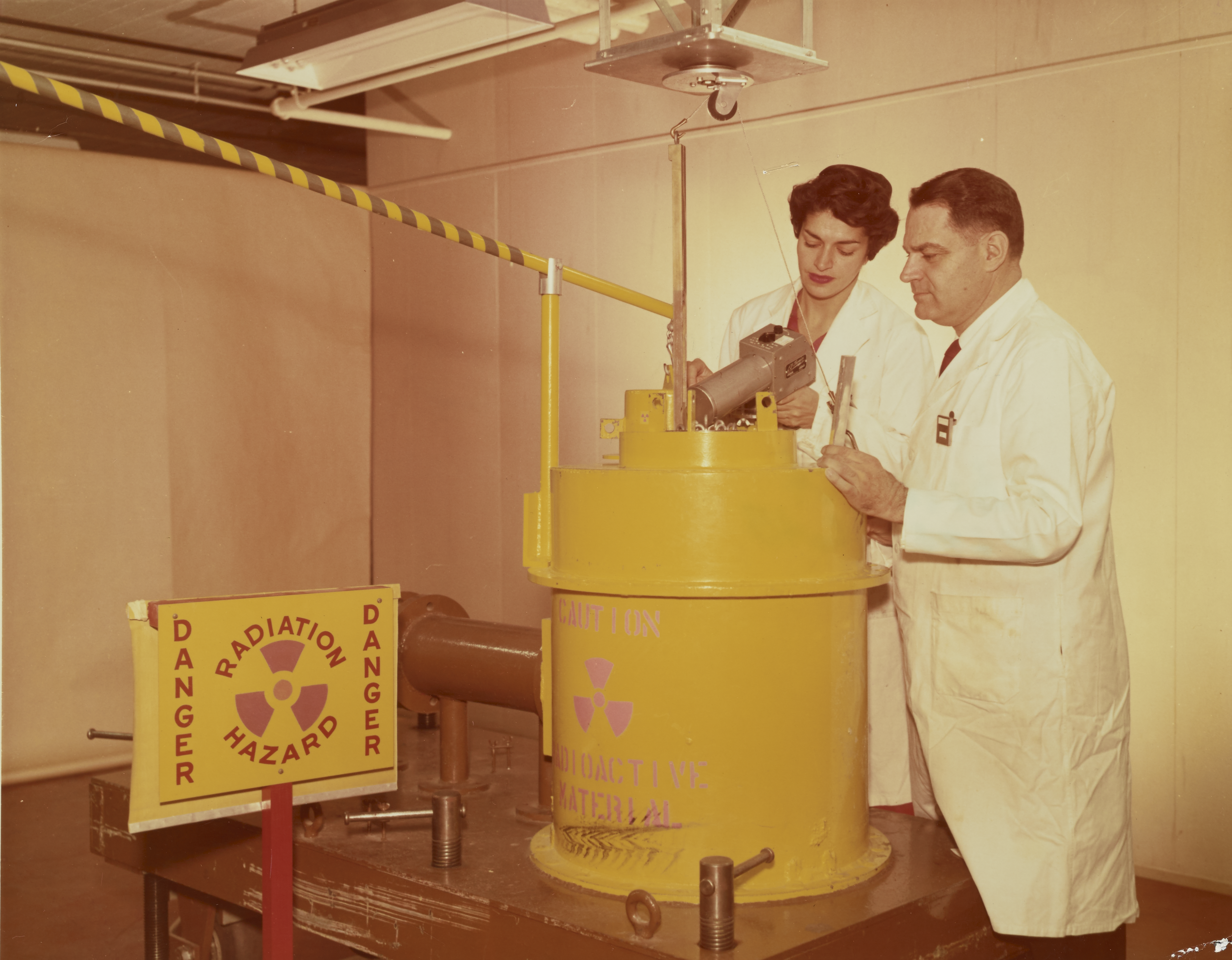
Eleanor Vadala and C.A. Cassola working with radioactive material, December 10, 1959

The year 1959 in science and technology involved some significant events, listed below.

== Astronomy and space exploration ==
- January 2 – Soviet spacecraft Luna 1 is launched by a Vostok rocket from the Baikonur Cosmodrome; the first man-made object to attain escape velocity, it is intended to impact Earth's Moon, but an error causes it instead to become the first spacecraft to fly by the Moon and the first man-made object to enter heliocentric orbit.
- February 6 – At Cape Canaveral, Florida, the first successful test firing of a Titan intercontinental ballistic missile is accomplished.
- February 17 – Vanguard 2, the first weather satellite, is launched to measure cloud cover for the United States Navy.
- March 3 – Lunar probe Pioneer 4 becomes the first American object to escape dominance by Earth's gravity.
- April 9 – NASA announces its selection of seven military pilots to become the first United States astronauts, later known as the 'Mercury Seven'.
- May 28 – Jupiter AM-18 rocket launches two primates, Miss Baker and Miss Able, into space from Cape Canaveral in the United States along with living microorganisms and plant seeds. Successful recovery makes them the first living beings to return safely to Earth after space flight.
- June 25 – A KH-1 Corona satellite, believed to be the first operational spy satellite, is launched as science mission "Discoverer 4" from Vandenberg Air Force Base, California, aboard a Thor-Agena rocket.
- July 7 – At 14:28 UT Venus occults the star Regulus. The rare event (which will next occur on October 1, 2044) is used to determine the diameter of Venus and the structure of Venus' atmosphere.
- August 7 – The United States launches the Explorer 6 satellite from the Atlantic Missile Range in Cape Canaveral.
- August 14 – Explorer 6 sends the first picture of Earth from orbit.
- September 14 – Soviet spacecraft Luna 2 becomes the first man-made object to crash on Earth's Moon.
- September 19 – Giuseppe Cocconi and Philip Morrison establish the scientific rationale for SETI with the publishing of their seminal paper "Searching for Interstellar Communications" in Nature.
- October 7 – Soviet probe Luna 3 sends back the first images of the far side of Earth's Moon.
- October 13 – The United States launches research satellite Explorer 7.
- November 24 – Yardymli meteorite makes a landfall in Azerbaijan.
- December 4 – Little Joe 2, a mission in the Mercury program, carries Sam, a rhesus macaque monkey, close to the edge of space.
- Coma Berenicids discovered.
- First successful test of a nuclear thermal rocket engine, as part of Project Rover at Los Alamos National Laboratory in the United States under Raemer Schreiber.

== Biology ==
- January 1 – Cultivars of plants named after this date must be named in a modern language, not in Latin.
- March 26 – Jersey Zoo (later Durrell Wildlife Park) established by Gerald Durrell.
- August 8 – Min Chueh Chang reports the first mammals, a litter of rabbits, grown from ova having undergone in vitro fertilisation and transferred to a surrogate mother.
- The term pheromone is coined.
- Pierre-Paul Grassé invents the theory of stigmergy to explain the behavior of nest building in termites.
- The Caspian tiger becomes extinct in Iran.

== Chemistry ==
- B. J. Davis and Leonard Ornstein first describe the use of acrylamide in gel electrophoresis at a scientific meeting.

== Computer science ==
- December – The specification for the programming language COBOL is completed.
- IBM ship the transistor-based IBM 1401 mainframe.
- Grigore Moisil publishes Teoria algebrică a mecanismelor automate [Algebraic theory of automatic machines], on automata theory, in Bucharest.

== History of science ==
- Society for the History of Technology begins publication of the journal Technology and Culture.

== Mathematics ==
- July 21 – The inaugural International Mathematical Olympiad, a competition for pre-university students, is held, in Romania.
- October – Martin Gardner presents the Three Prisoners problem in probability theory.
- Edsger W. Dijkstra rediscovers 'Prim's algorithm'.
- Kenkichi Iwasawa initiates Iwasawa theory.

== Medicine ==
- July – The Japanese medical research group studying Minamata disease comes to the conclusion that mercury is the cause.
- Joseph Murray performs the world's first successful allotransplantation.
- Georges Mathé, a French oncologist, performs the first bone marrow transplant on five Yugoslavian nuclear workers whose own marrow has been damaged by intense irradiation caused by a criticality accident at the Vinča Nuclear Institute, but all of these transplants are rejected.
- First known case of human HIV, in the Belgian Congo.

== Paleontology ==
- July 17 – Paranthropus boisei (originally designated Zinjanthropus), an Australopithecine, is found in the Olduvai Gorge of Tanganyika by Mary and Louis Leakey, dating from between 2.6 and 1.1 million years BP.
- First femur of Arlington Springs Man is found on Santa Rosa Island, California, by Phil C. Orr. The remains are subsequently dated to 13,000 years BP, making them potentially the oldest known human remains in North America.

== Physics ==
- Yakir Aharonov and David Bohm predict the Aharonov–Bohm effect.
- Austria joins CERN.
- December 29 – Richard Feynman delivers a lecture "There's Plenty of Room at the Bottom", anticipating the field of nanotechnology.

== Technology ==
- June 9 – The USS George Washington is launched at Groton, Connecticut, as the first submarine to carry ballistic missiles (December 30 – commissioned).
- June 14 – At Disneyland in Anaheim, California, new rides are opened in the Tomorrowland area, designed by Bob Gurr:
  - The Disneyland Monorail, the world's first regularly operating passenger-carrying monorail (Alweg system).
  - The Matterhorn Bobsleds, the world's first tubular steel roller coaster, constructed by Arrow Development.
- August 13 – First automobile delivered with the modern form of three-point seat belt developed by Nils Bohlin for Volvo in Sweden.
- August 31 – Frank Der Yuen is granted a United States patent for the jet bridge (passenger boarding bridge).
- September 16 – The Xerox 914, the first plain paper copier, is introduced to the public.
- November – The MOSFET (metal–oxide–semiconductor field-effect transistor), also known as the MOS transistor, is invented by Mohamed Atalla and Dawon Kahng at Bell Labs in the United States. It revolutionizes the electronics industry, becomes the fundamental building block of the Information Age and goes on to become the most widely manufactured device in history.
- Agfa introduces the first fully automatic camera, the Optima.
- Eveready Battery engineer Lewis Urry invents the long-lasting alkaline battery.
- Gordon Gould publishes the term Laser.
- Pilkington Brothers patent the float glass process invented by Alastair Pilkington.

== Events ==
- May 7 – English scientist and novelist C. P. Snow delivers an influential Rede Lecture on The Two Cultures, concerning a perceived breakdown of communication between the sciences and humanities, in the Senate House, University of Cambridge. It is subsequently published as The Two Cultures and the Scientific Revolution.
- Lois Graham becomes the first woman in the United States to earn a PhD in mechanical engineering, at Illinois Institute of Technology.

== Awards ==
- Nobel Prizes
  - Physics – Emilio Gino Segrè, – Owen Chamberlain
  - Chemistry – Jaroslav Heyrovský
  - Medicine – Severo Ochoa, Arthur Kornberg

== Births ==
- March 9 – Takaaki Kajita, Japanese nuclear physicist (Nobel Prize in Physics 2015).
- May 27 – Donna Strickland, Canadian physicist (Nobel Prize in Physics 2018).
- August 3 – Koichi Tanaka, Japanese chemist (Nobel Prize in Chemistry 2002).
- August 29 – Stephen Wolfram, British-born mathematician.
- September 7 – Drew Weissman, American biochemist (Nobel Prize in Physiology or Medicine 2013).
- September 22 – Saul Perlmutter, American astrophysicist (Nobel Prize in Physics 2011).
- October 16 – Pamela C. Rasmussen, American ornithologist.
- December 25 – Michael P. Anderson (died 2003), American astronaut.

== Deaths ==
- January 21 – Frances Gertrude McGill (born 1882), pioneering Canadian forensic pathologist.
- February 15 – Sir Owen Richardson (born 1879), English physicist (Nobel Prize in Physics 1928).
- June 9 – Adolf Windaus (born 1876), German chemist (Nobel Prize in Chemistry 1928).
- June 11 – Grantly Dick-Read (born 1890), English obstetrician.
- September 30 – Ross Granville Harrison (born 1870), American physiologist.
- October 29
  - Samuel James Cameron (born 1878), Scottish obstetrician.
  - Edith Clarke (born 1883), American electrical engineer, inducted into the National Inventors Hall of Fame
- November 15 – C. T. R. Wilson (born 1869), Scottish physicist (Nobel Prize in Physics 1927).
