= Pearl Harbor Aviation Museum =

- Former name: Pacific Aviation Museum Pearl Harbor
- Established: 1996
- Location: Ford Island, Pearl Harbor, Hawaii, United States
- Coordinates: 21.3600°N 157.9617°W
- Type: Aviation museum
- Collections: Aviation
- Collection size: 43 aircraft
- Founder: John Sterling
- Director: Elissa Lines
- Curator: Rod Bengston
- Public transit access: Roberts Hawaii
- Website: www. pearlharboraviationmuseum.org

Pearl Harbor Aviation Museum (formerly the Pacific Aviation Museum Pearl Harbor) is a non-profit founded in 1999 to develop an aviation museum in Hawaii. Part of Senator Daniel Inouye's vision for a rebirth of Ford Island, the museum hosts a variety of aviation exhibits with a majority relating directly to the attack on Pearl Harbor and World War II. The museum occupies Hangars 37 and 79 and covers 16 acres (6.5 ha). The museum's hangars show damage from the attacks on Pearl Harbor from December 7, 1941.

The museum has been involved in community events ranging from preservation of historical landmarks to educational tours throughout Hawai'i. The focus devoted efforts to restoring the Ford Island control tower and signed a lease with the Navy to begin repairs. Visitors to the museum gain access via tour bus from the Pearl Harbor Historic Sites on Halawa landing. The museum has received awards for their efforts to restore historical buildings.

== History ==
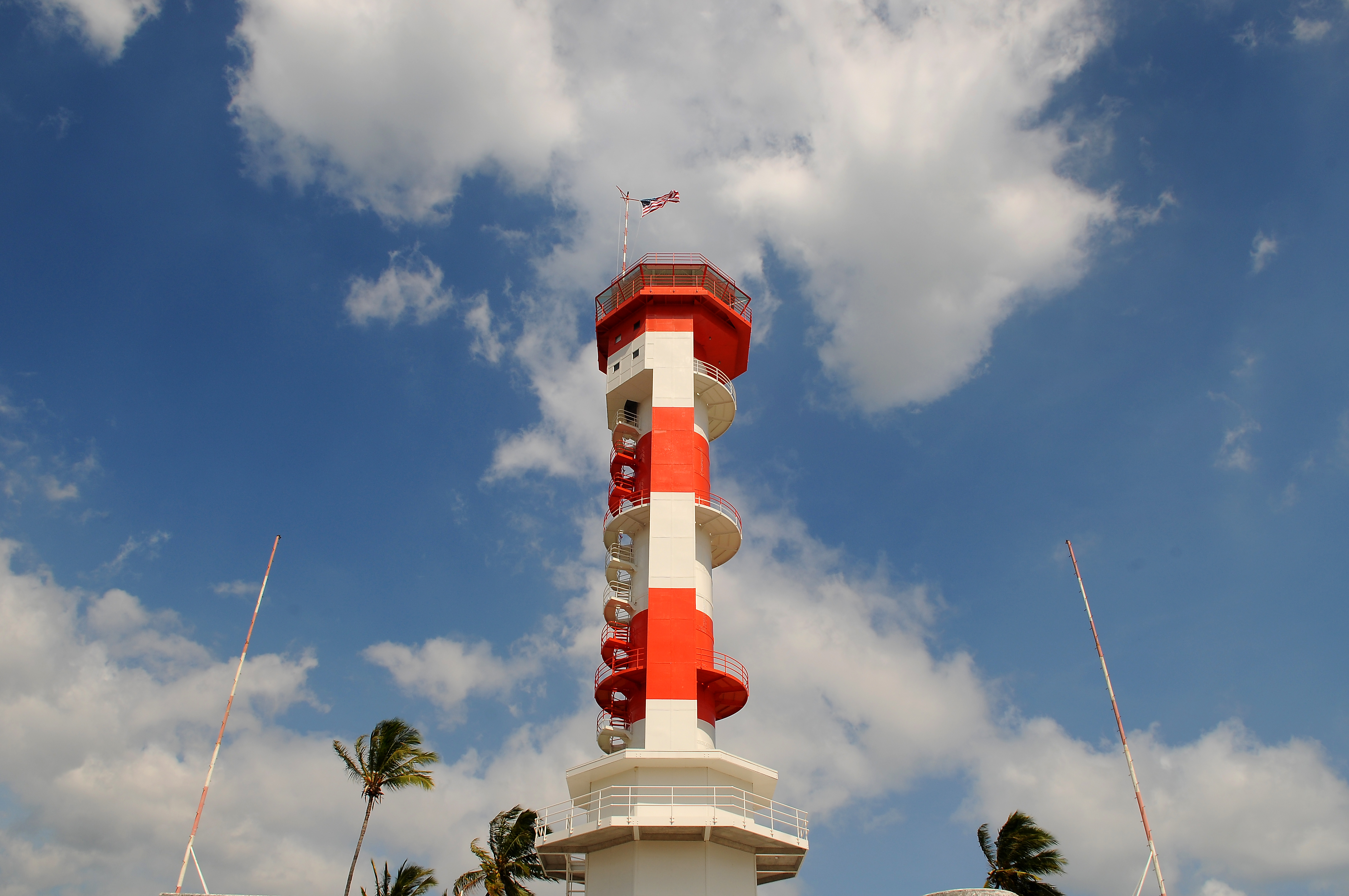
Control tower on Ford Island seen in the movies Tora! Tora! Tora! and Pearl Harbor. The tower is being restored by the Pacific Aviation Museum Pearl Harbor.

In 1983, the Pacific Aerospace Museum was formed inside Honolulu International Airport after pressure from the Hawaiian Chamber of Commerce to create an aviation museum in Hawaii succeeded. The first phase of the museum opened in 1991 and was founded by Frank Der Yuen. The idea for the Pacific Aviation Museum began on the anniversary of the victory over Japan in 1995. Due to airport expansion plans, the Pacific Aerospace Museum operation was suspended in the fall of 2001 and finally removed two years later. A few of the exhibits were salvaged by the Pacific Aviation Museum Pearl Harbor foundation as well as responsibility for the education and scholarship programs.

Prior to the completion of the Admiral Clarey Bridge in 1998, access to Ford Island was provided via ferry boat only to those residing on Ford Island and their guests. Senator Inouye proposed a $500,000,000 "rebirth" of Ford Island through special legislation (10 U.S.C. § 2814) to authorize the Navy to sell land to fund the rebirth. The plan included 500 new homes for Navy personnel, a new child development center, a new Navy lodge, and the Pacific Aviation Museum Pearl Harbor. The original museum was called the Military Aviation Museum of the Pacific. The foundation sought funds to raise the original $46 million goal from various sources including the US State of Hawaii, the United States Congress, the United States Navy, and fundraising dinners. It received support from former US astronaut Captain Walter Schirra. While executive director of the San Diego Air & Space Museum, Allan Palmer was hired by the United States Air Force to conduct a feasibility study on an aviation museum in Hawaii and then hired as its executive direction and chief executive operating officer.

A groundbreaking ceremony was held March 21, 2006 for the $75,000,000 construction of the museum. It opened on December 7, 2006 on the 65th anniversary of the attack on Pearl Harbor. In 2006, its board consisted of former United States president George H. W. Bush, Brigadier General Chuck Yeager, and retired Brigadier General Paul Tibbets. By the end of the following year, it announced Ken DeHoff as a new executive director as well as plans to expand into the adjacent Hangar 79 and restore the former base control tower. Four fighter jets, three of which had previously been maintained by the Hawaii Air National Guard, arrived at the museum in November 2009. In 2012, the Pacific Aviation Museum Pearl Harbor was named an affiliate of the Smithsonian Institution as part of the Smithsonian Affiliations program. On April 4, 2013, the museum received its millionth visitor.

The museum opened a 4,000 square foot Aviation Learning Center in 2021. The museum announced a fundraising campaign to renovate Hangar 79 in December 2025. It hired a new director of restoration in late August 2026.

== Facilities ==
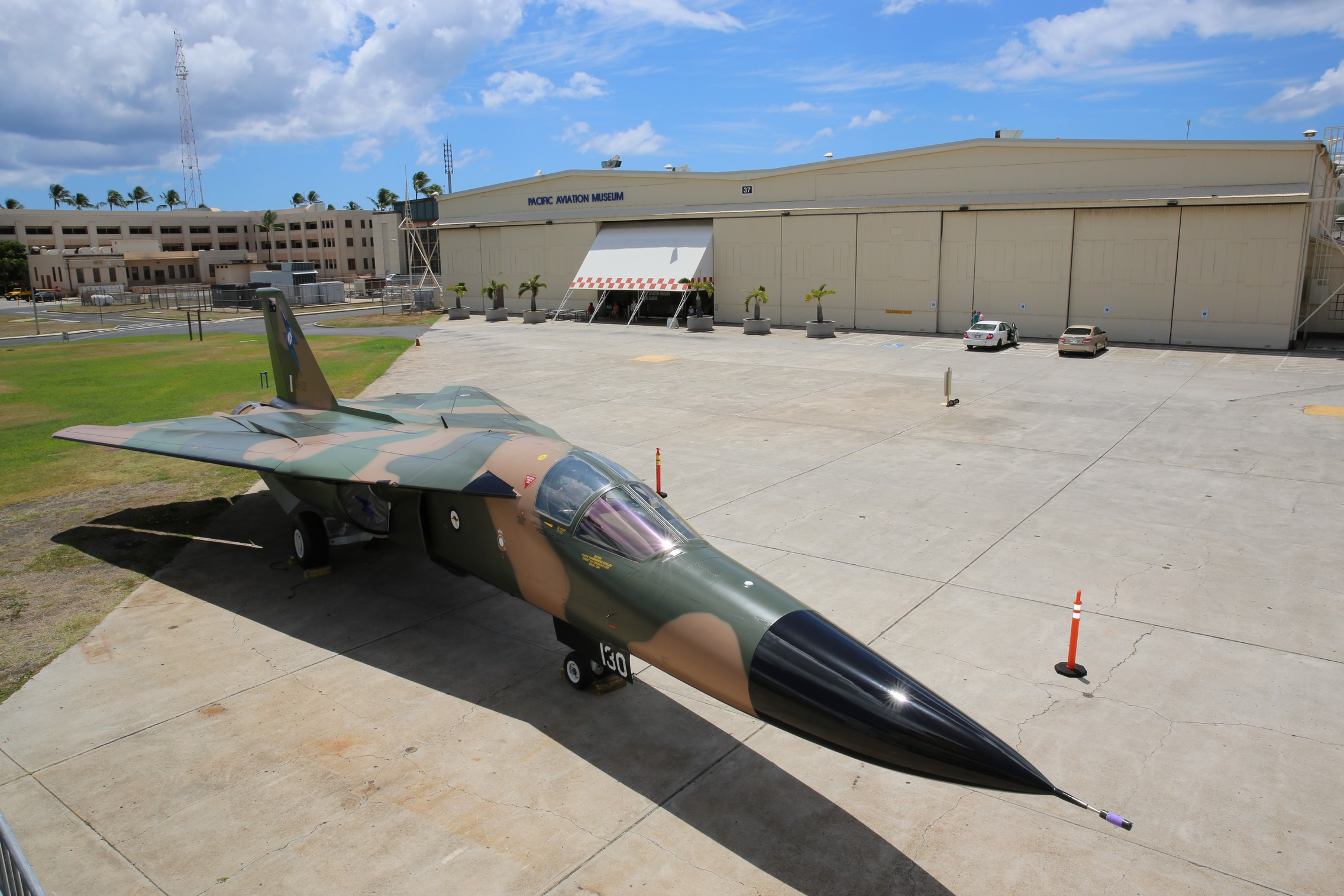
The arrival of a retired Royal Australian Air Force F-111C in front of hangar 37

Due to its historical significance, as the location of the first radio alert of the attack on Pearl Harbor, the museum plans to spend over $7,500,000 repairing the Ford Island control tower. It was registered as a category 1 structure in the 1978 Pearl Harbor Naval Base Historic Preservation Plan and is being restored by Kiewit Building Group; the same contractor who built the museum. The 70-year-old 158 feet (48 m) tower suffers from deteriorating steel stairs, landing, and beams that require repair or replacement. A grant through the United States Department of Defense appropriations for the stabilization and restoration of a historical landmark was given to the museum for $3,800,000 which provided the initial funds to start the project. The control tower, as well as the runway, has been designated a national historic landmark since 1964. In 2010, records filed with Congress shows that defense firms had donated nearly $449,000 to the museum during efforts to raise money to restore the tower. The tower was considered a personal issue for Senator Inouye and many of these donations were made in his memory. The tower was featured in the films Tora! Tora! Tora! and Pearl Harbor.

Hangar 37, a former seaplane hangar and a survivor of the attack on Pearl Harbor, was the first hangar developed for the museum. The 7.25 acres (2.93 ha) facility consists of nine exhibits, a movie theater, flight simulators, a store and a restaurant. The renovation cost was $11,000,000 and was raised by federal and state grants and through donations by local corporations. Built in 1939 and at over 87,000 square feet (8,100 m^{2}), Hangar 79 is the restoration hangar but also contains many of the museums exhibits including the flying tigers exhibit, MiG Alley exhibit, and various helicopters, jets, and civil aircraft. The hangar's glass windows are still riddled with bullet holes from Japanese aircraft from the day of the attack. Tawani Foundation donated $82,500 for the renovation of Hangar 79.

The Lt. Ted Shealy Restoration Shop is located in Hangar 79. Established in 2007 through a donation, it is where the museum performs maintenance on its aircraft.

== Exhibits ==
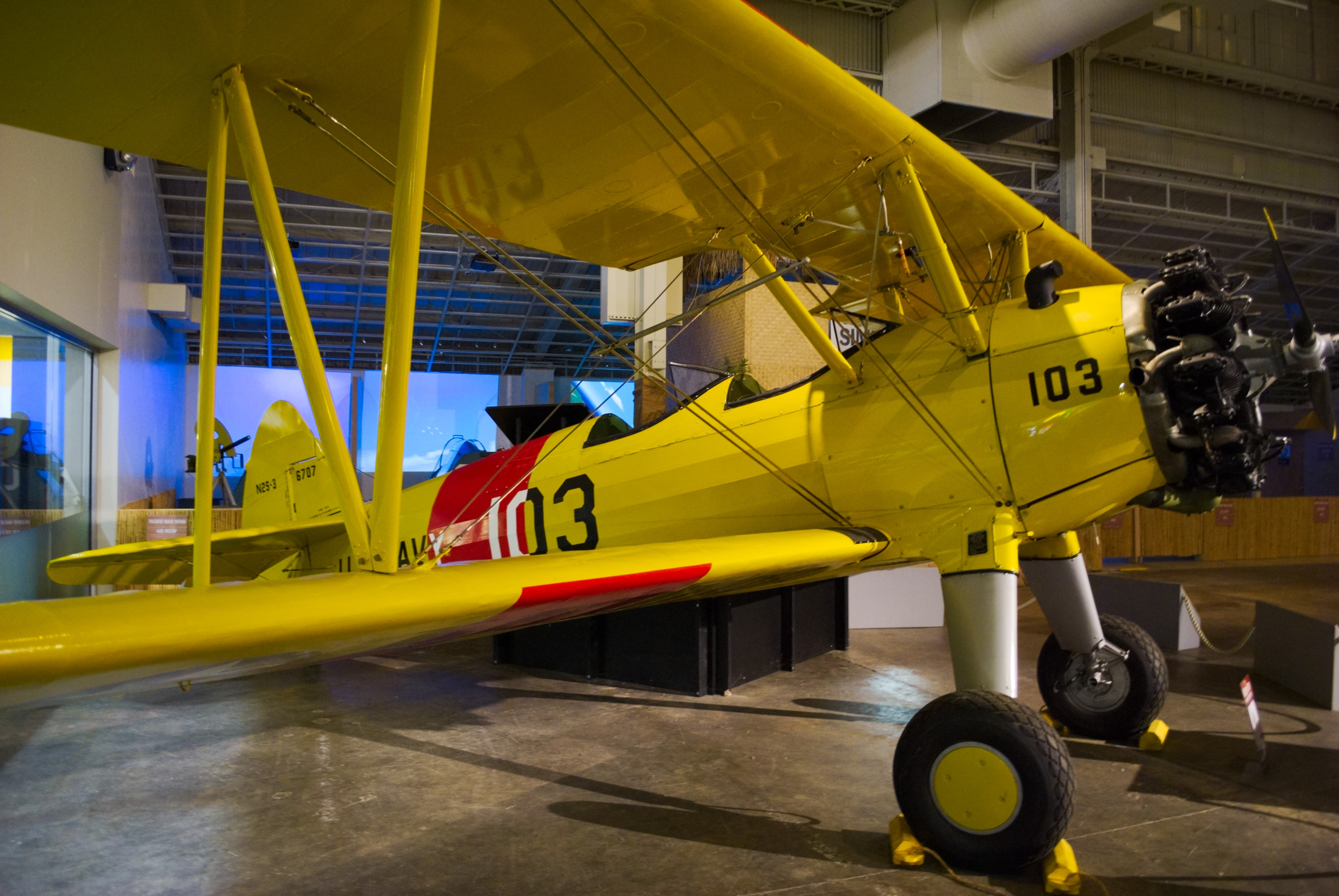
Boeing Stearman Model 75 flown by former President George H. W. Bush

In 2009, former McDonald's CEO Fred L. Turner sponsored the restoration of a Douglas SBD Dauntless. The Boeing N2S-3 Stearman used by former President George H. W. Bush for flight training and used for his first solo flight is an exhibit at the museum.

The remains of the Japanese A6M2 Zero "B11-120" from the carrier Hiryu piloted by Airman First Class Shigenori Nishikaichi, who crash landed on Niʻihau after the second wave of the attack on Pearl Harbor, are stored at the museum. It is displayed exactly as it was after the crash. The remains of the tractor used to create trenches to prevent such a landing are stored at the museum. The trenches were created after the island was warned that the Japanese had planned to use the island as a forward operating base.

A Japanese A6M2-21 Zero similar to the aircraft used in the attack on Pearl Harbor was salvaged in 1968 and restored to flying condition in 1985. Originally, it flew with the Japanese air group 201 in the Solomon Islands. It was sold to the Confederate Air Force for use in air shows and later sold to the museum in 2006.

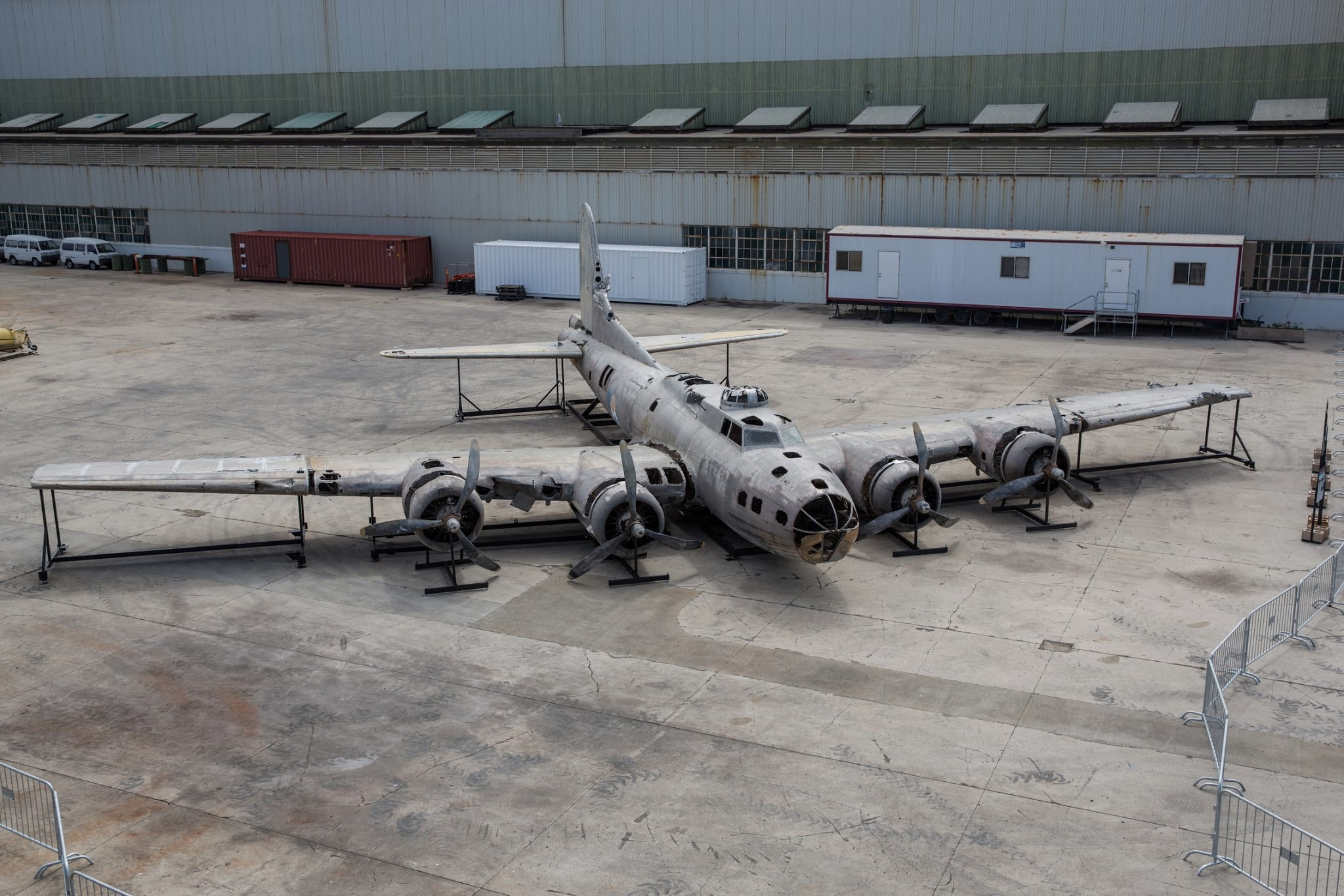
Swamp Ghost restoration

On April 11, 2013, the remains of a B-17 bomber arrived at the Pacific Aviation Museum Pearl Harbor almost 70 years after avoiding destruction during the attack on Pearl Harbor. The restoration project is expected to cost $5,000,000. The plane, called "Swamp Ghost", was supposed to fly to Hickam Field on December 7, 1941 but was delayed due to engine trouble and avoided the attack. Later, it was used in the February 22, 1942 bombing of Rabaul. After the bombing, the plane was attacked by nine Japanese fighters on its return to base, was struck on the wing, and crashed in marsh water. The plane remained there for 64 years, earning its nickname, and the wreckage was used as a navigational aid. It appeared in National Geographic in 1992 and several attempts were made to recover the aircraft, but it was not successfully recovered until 2006 and arrived back in the United States in 2010. It was purchased by the museum in 2011. It was delivered in seven separate shipment containers and is being restored outside of hangar 79.

In June 2012, the museum debuted a 10-foot (3.0 m) tall, 40-foot (12 m) wide diorama of the Battle of Midway. The diorama was commissioned in 2008 for $400,000 on the advice of Turner and took three years to complete by former US Navy pilot Karl Lau.

=== East, Wind, Rain ===
In 2008, the Hawaii Pacific University documentary and corporate video class completed development of a 12-minute film titled East, Wind, Rain to replace the older film shown to visitors at the museum. The film explains the surprise attack on Pearl Harbor to museum guests and won the 2010 Pixie Gold Award from American Pixel Academy.

== Collection ==
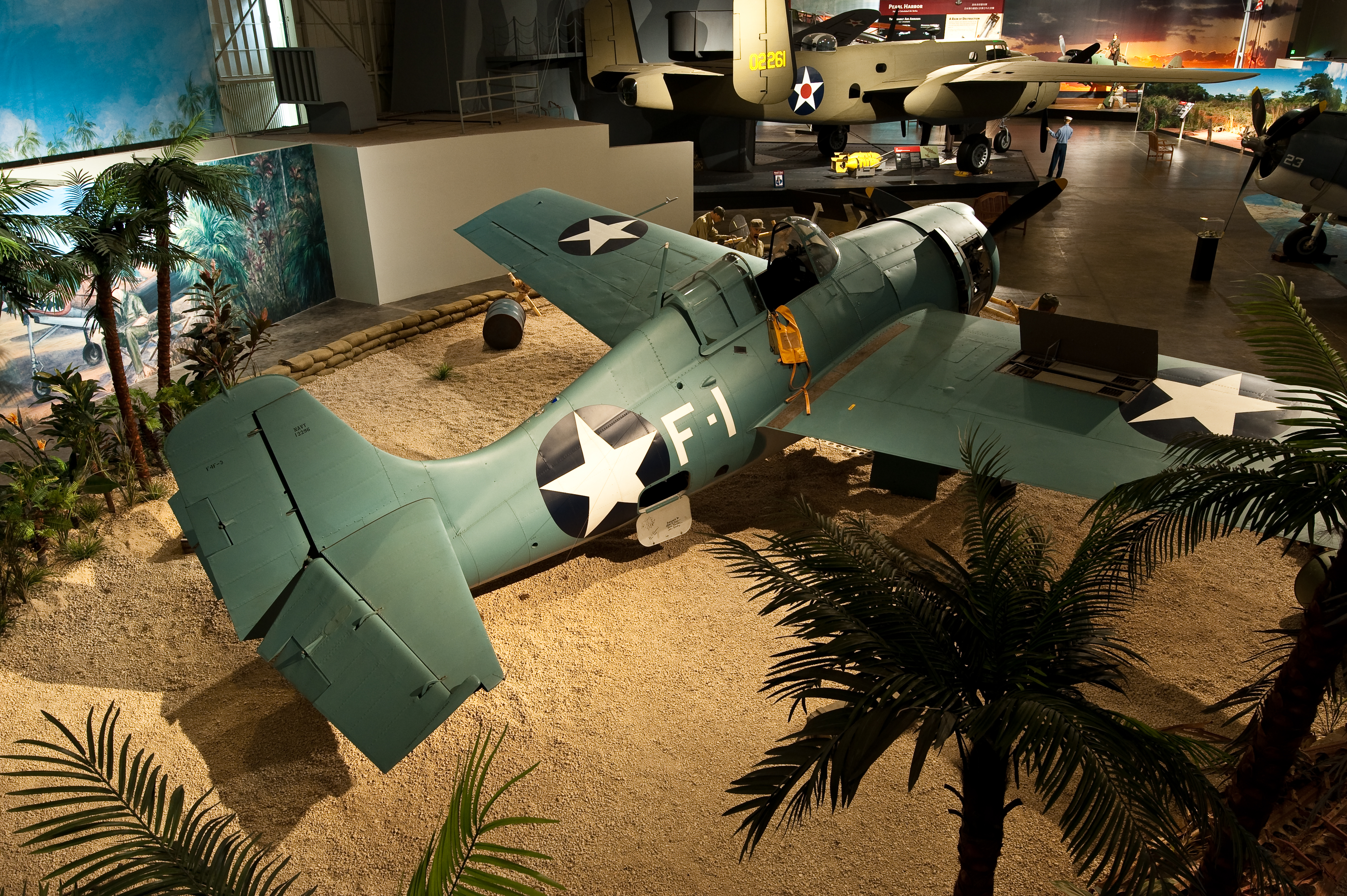
F4F-3 Wildcat on display representing Cactus Air during the Battle of Guadalcanal

- Aeronca Model 65TC
- Bell AH-1G Cobra
- Bell OH-58D Kiowa Warrior
- Bell UH-1 Iroquois
- Boeing B-17E Flying Fortress "Swamp Ghost"
- Boeing B-52E Stratofortress – nose section
- Boeing Vertol CH-46E Sea Knight
- Boeing N2S-3 Stearman
- Cessna O-2A Skymaster
- Convair F-102A Delta Dagger
- Curtiss P-40D Kittyhawk
- Douglas NTA-3B Skywarrior
- Douglas C-47A Skytrain
- Douglas SBD-2P Dauntless
- General Dynamics F-16A Fighting Falcon
- General Dynamics F-111C
- General Motors TBM-3U Avenger
- Grumman F4F-3 Wildcat
- Grumman F-14D Tomcat
- Lockheed F-104A Starfighter
- Lockheed T-33A Shooting Star
- McDonnell Douglas F-15A Eagle
- McDonnell Douglas F/A-18C Hornet
- McDonnell Douglas F-4C Phantom II
- Mikoyan-Gurevich MiG-21PF
- Mitsubishi A6M2 Model 21
- North American B-25B Mitchell – composite
- North American F-86E Sabre
- North American F-86L Sabre
- North American F-100F Super Sabre
- North American SNJ-5
- Northrop F-5A Freedom Fighter
- Republic F-105G Thunderchief
- Republic RC-3 Seabee
- Sikorsky UH-3H Sea King
- Sikorsky HH-34J Choctaw
- Sikorsky CH-53D Sea Stallion
- Sikorsky SH-60B Seahawk
- Stinson L-13A
- WSK Lim-2

== Public reception ==
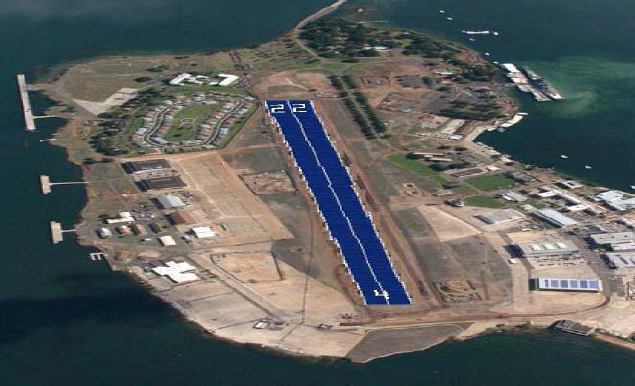
Conceptual design for photovoltaic panels covering the historic runway on Ford Island

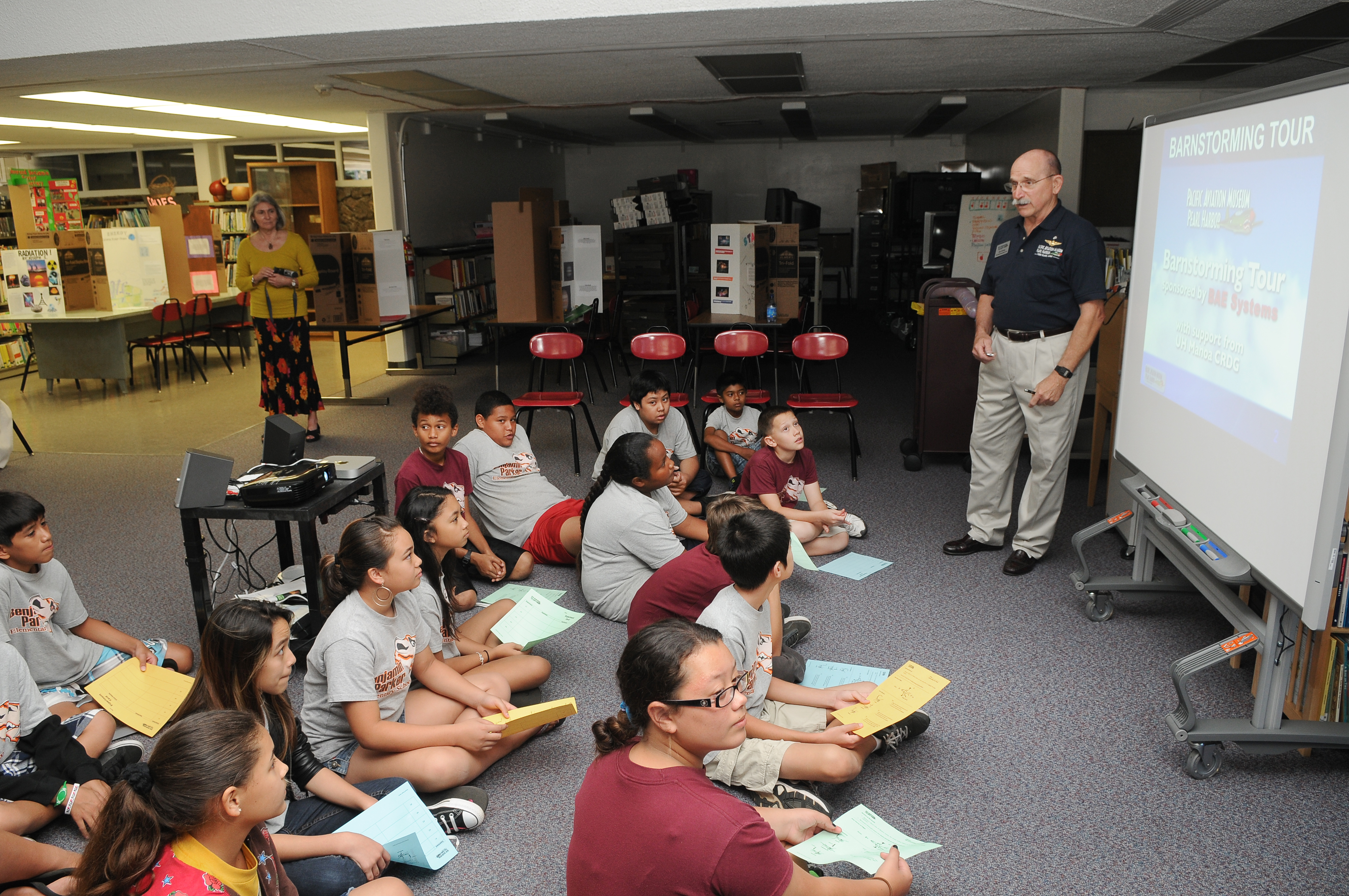
Barnstorming program

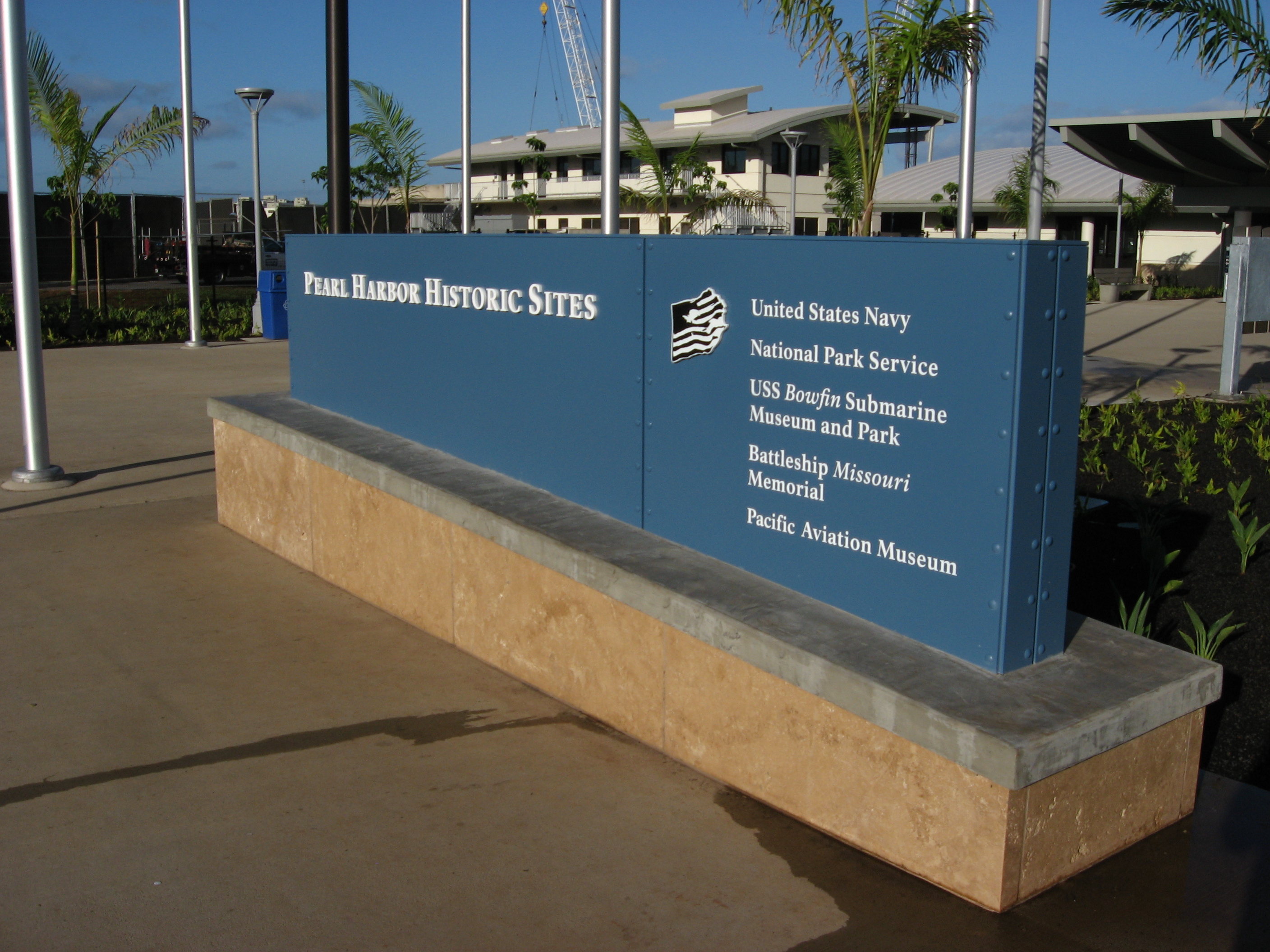
Sign out in front of the Pearl Harbor Historic Sites at Halawa Landing on O'ahu, Hawaii

=== Controversies ===
In 2013 the museum planned to host 1,500 Chinese nationals from Amway China on Ford Island who were particularly interested in the Flying Tigers exhibit. The Navy expressed concerns about this plan as Ford Island remains an active military installation. Despite these concerns, the Navy approved the event and erected a 6-foot (1.8 m) tall fence.

In March 2013 the museum's online ticketing service was hacked. The museum's service provider, Vendini, believed that none of the data of its customers was accessed.

In June 2013 the museum fought the US Navy's plan to install 60,000 photovoltaic panels over 28 acres on the Ford Island runway. The Navy had intended to comply with Congressional and Defense Department mandates to reduce dependence on fossil fuels and offset the cost of Hawaiian energy costs, which are the highest in the United States. The plan deviated from a 2009 proposal which would use the panels to define the historic runway in favor of panels which would produce twice the power. The Navy offered the museum $250,000 toward renovation of the control tower's elevator in exchange for their support of the plan which the museum declined. It organized an internet campaign to oppose the plan based on historical significance. Instead, the Navy decided to install the panels on existing structures around Pearl Harbor.

=== Community involvement ===
In 2008, the museum received a grant from BAE Systems to fund its Barnstorming program to build wind tunnels and plane props that will tour local schools to teach aerospace education to sixth graders. In 2012, the program was credited with teaching 3,500 students from 40 schools.

In 2013, the U.S. State Department awarded the museum the "Museums Connect" grant for the "Past to Present: U.S. -Sino Bridge of Connections" program. The program allowed students from Kaiser High School to participate in a cultural heritage exchange with students in Chengdu, China and conduct research into 1940s American-Chinese relations.

=== Tourism ===
During the 2013 federal budget sequestration in the United States, the Pacific Aviation Museum Pearl Harbor received an increase in tourists, due to limited ferry trips to the USS Arizona Memorial which are operated by active duty United States Navy personnel. While former and active military tourists gain access through the Admiral Clarey bridge and because Ford Island is still part of the active military base Joint Base Pearl Harbor–Hickam, non-military tourists gain access via the National Park Service's Halawa Landing, now known as the Pearl Harbor Historic Sites, for tickets to the museum and then are transported via tour bus onto the installation for the museum and the USS Missouri.

== Recognition and awards ==
Pacific Aviation Museum Pearl Harbor was listed as the eighth top aviation attraction in the United States by TripAdvisor. In 2007, the museum was awarded a preservation award from the Historic Hawaii foundation for "a specific project that preserved, rehabilitated or restored a historic building, object, site or district" in the redevelopment of hangar 37.

== See also ==
- Onizuka Space Center
- List of aerospace museums
- List of museums in Hawaii
