= Agaiambo =

Swamp in Papua New Guinea

Coordinates: 9.0000°S 148.0833°E

Agaiambo is a swamp in Oro Province, Papua New Guinea.

During the Second World War a US Air Force Boeing B-17 Flying Fortress crashed into the area. In 1972 the plane was rediscovered nicknamed The Swamp Ghost.

It was claimed by a colonial administrator of British New Guinea that Agaiambo or Agaumbu was also the name of a population of marsh-dwellers. In his annual report for 1904 the acting administrator of British New Guinea stated that on a visit he paid to their district he saw six males and four females. The Agaiambo lived in huts erected on piles in the lakes and marshes. Short in stature but broadly built, he said that they were remarkable for the shortness of their legs. Their food was said to consist of sago, the roots of the water-lily and fish. The official also made the very strange claim that they lived almost entirely in their dug-out canoes or wading in the water. This seems highly improbable.In features, colour and hair they closely resembled true Melanesians.

The official wrote that the Agaiambo were formerly numerous, but had suffered from the raids of their cannibalistic Papuan neighbours. There is no evidence for these claims.
