= Swamp Ghost =

Wrecked WWII B-17E

Coordinates: 9.1979°S 148.6617°E

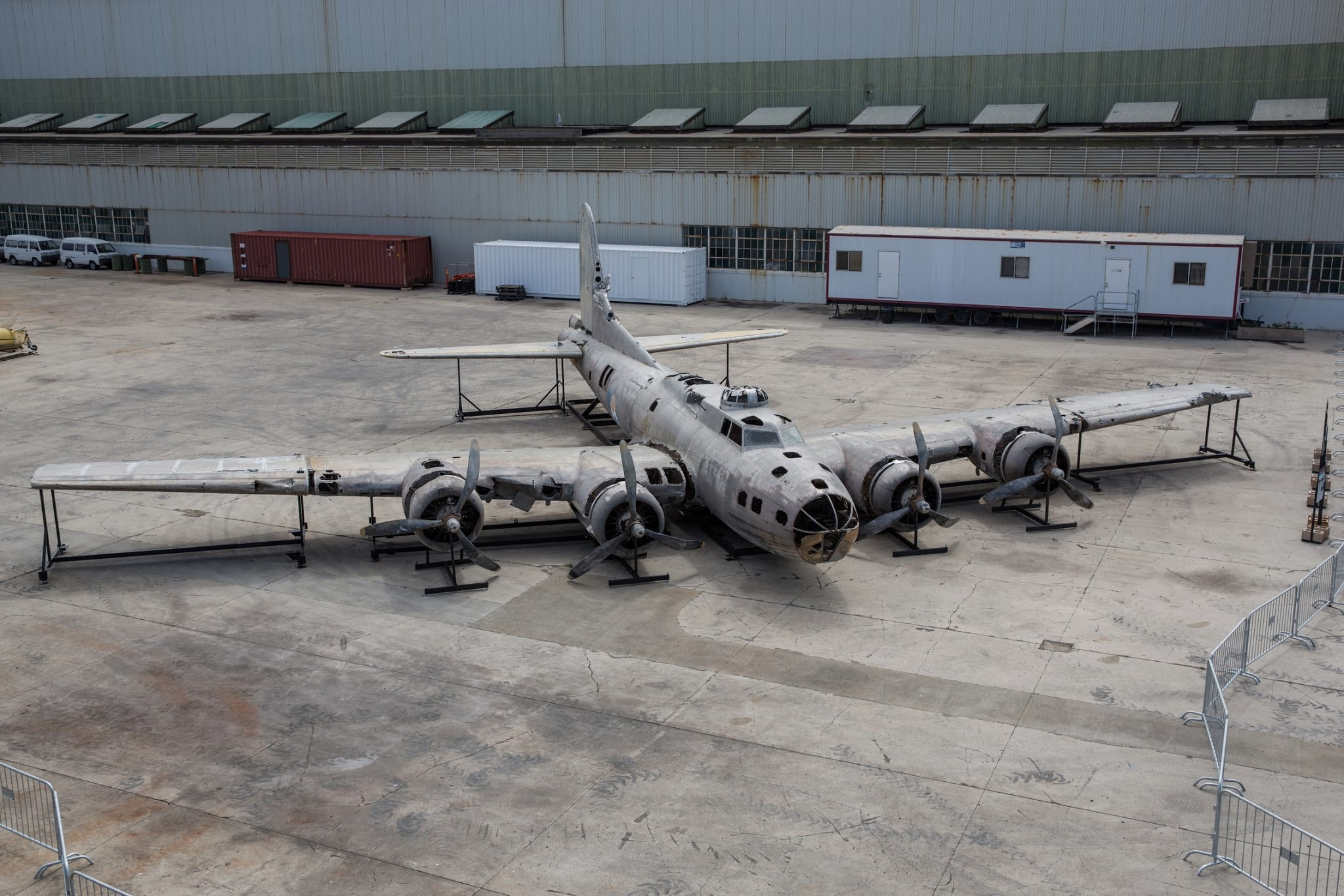
- Swamp Ghost restoration at the Pacific Aviation Museum Pearl Harbor, April 2014

General information
- Type: Boeing B-17E Flying Fortress
- Manufacturer: Boeing
- Owners: Delivered new to the USAAF
- Construction number: 2257
- Serial: 41-2446

History
- Manufactured: 1941
- First flight: 1941
- In service: 1941–1942
- Preserved at: Currently undergoing restoration at the Pearl Harbor Aviation Museum (as of 2022)
- Fate: Ran out of fuel and crash-landed in Agaiambo swamp, Oro Province, Papua New Guinea

The Swamp Ghost is a Boeing B-17E Flying Fortress piloted by Captain Frederick 'Fred' C. Eaton, Jr, that ditched in a swamp on Papua New Guinea during World War II, after an attack on ships at Japanese-occupied New Britain on February 23, 1942. While flying over Rabaul, it was intercepted and eventually, having run out of fuel, had to force-land in a remote swamp near the north coast of New Guinea. All of the crew survived the crash landing and arduous trek out.

== Discovery ==
The aircraft was rediscovered in 1972 in Agaiambo swamp, where it earned the nickname Swamp Ghost. In 1989, the Travis Air Force Base Heritage Center planned to recover it. It was salvaged in 2006 and moved to Lae wharf where it lay waiting for permission to be transferred to the United States. By February 2010, the wreck had been cleared for import to the United States.

== Display and restoration ==
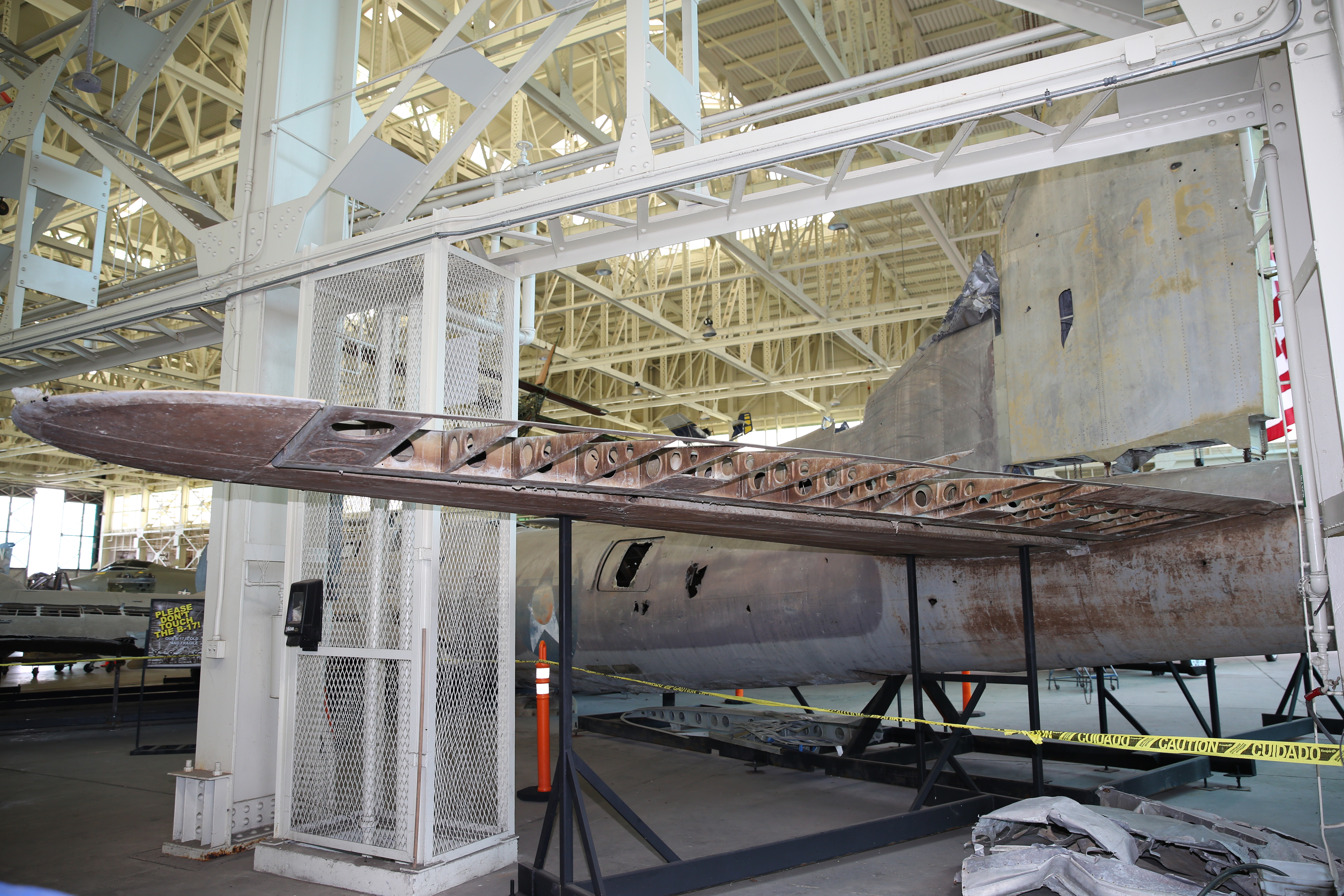
Swamp Ghost undergoing restoration in October 2015

In 2010, the aircraft was shipped to the United States, and on June 11, 2010, was shown to a public gathering in Long Beach, California, that included family members of the original crew. Plans were made to bring Swamp Ghost to the Pima Air & Space Museum in Tucson for restoration to static display. After arriving at Long Beach, the aircraft was on indefinite loan to the Planes of Fame Air Museum at Chino Airport.

The Swamp Ghost was received by the Pacific Aviation Museum in Pearl Harbor on April 10, 2013. As of August 2013, the museum planned to restore the aircraft for static display in Hangar 79 on Ford Island. As of February 2022, the aircraft is on display in Hangar 79, undergoing restoration.

== See also ==
- List of surviving Boeing B-17 Flying Fortresses
