= Frank Der Yuen =

American aeronautical engineer

Frank Der Yuen (February 20, 1912 – September 17, 1984) was an American aeronautical engineer who resided in Honolulu, Honolulu County, Hawaii. He was the inventor of the jet bridge (passenger boarding bridge), among other inventions. He graduated from the Massachusetts Institute of Technology in 1933.

== Recognition ==
In his recognition, the Frank Der Yuen Aviation Scholarship is awarded by the Pacific Aviation Museum Pearl Harbor.
