= Jet bridge =

Enclosed movable bridge which extends from an airport terminal gate to an airplane

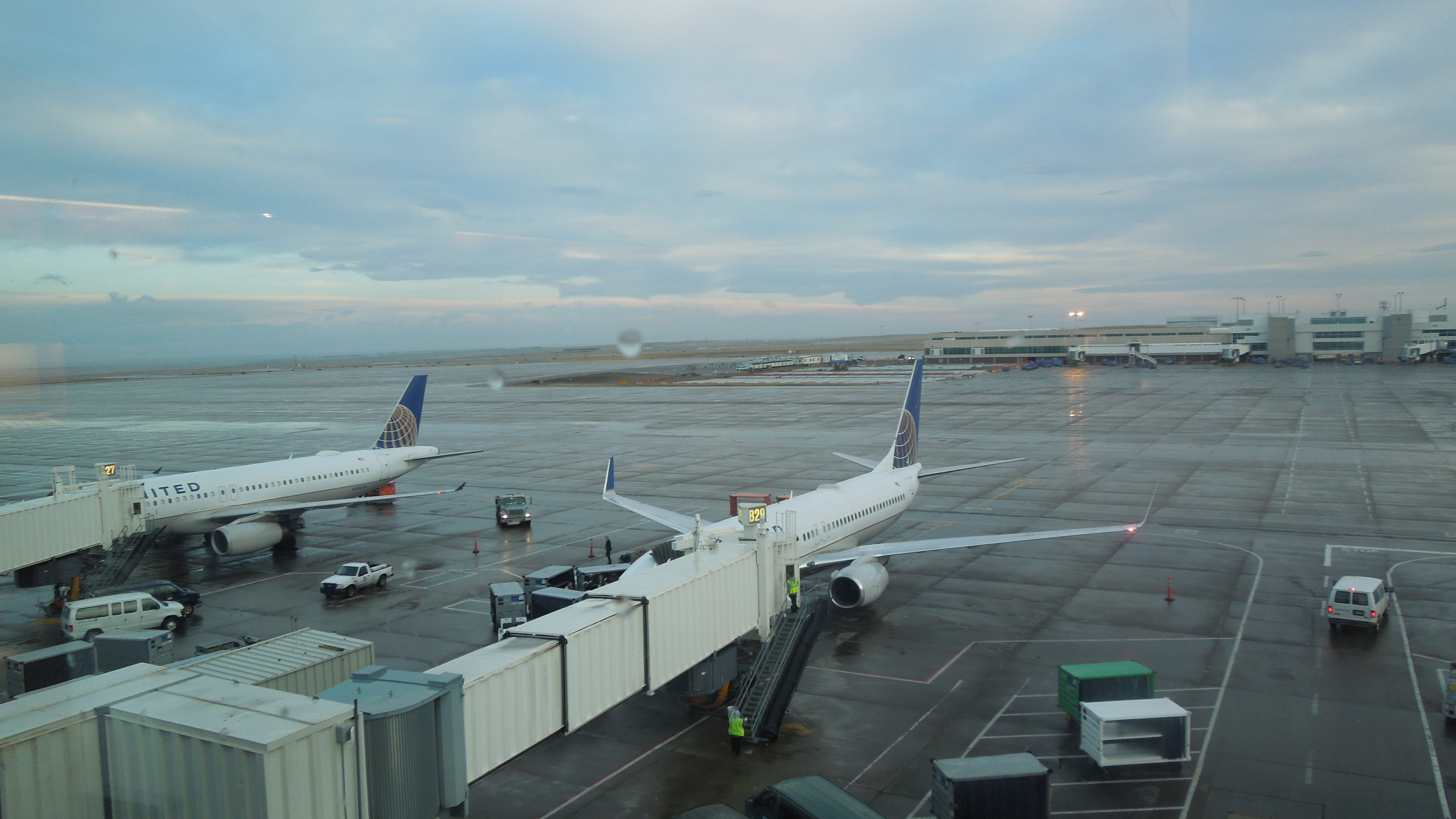
United Airlines planes lined up at their jet bridges at Denver International Airport in March 2014

A jet bridge (Note: Also termed jetway, jetwalk, airgate, jetty, gangway, planeplank, aerobridge/airbridge, finger, skybridge, airtube, expedited suspended passenger entry system (E-SPES), or its official industry name passenger boarding bridge (PBB))) is an enclosed connector which most commonly extends from an airport terminal gate to an airplane, and in some instances from a port to a boat or ship, allowing passengers to board and disembark without heading outside and being exposed to harsh weather. Depending on building design, sill heights, fueling positions, and operational requirements, a jet bridge may be fixed or movable, swinging radially, or extending in length. The jetway was invented by Frank Der Yuen.

Similar devices are used for astronauts to enter spacecraft, which are installed at the appropriate height of the launch tower.

== History ==
A jet bridge at Edmonton International Airport in Edmonton, Canada, in 2026

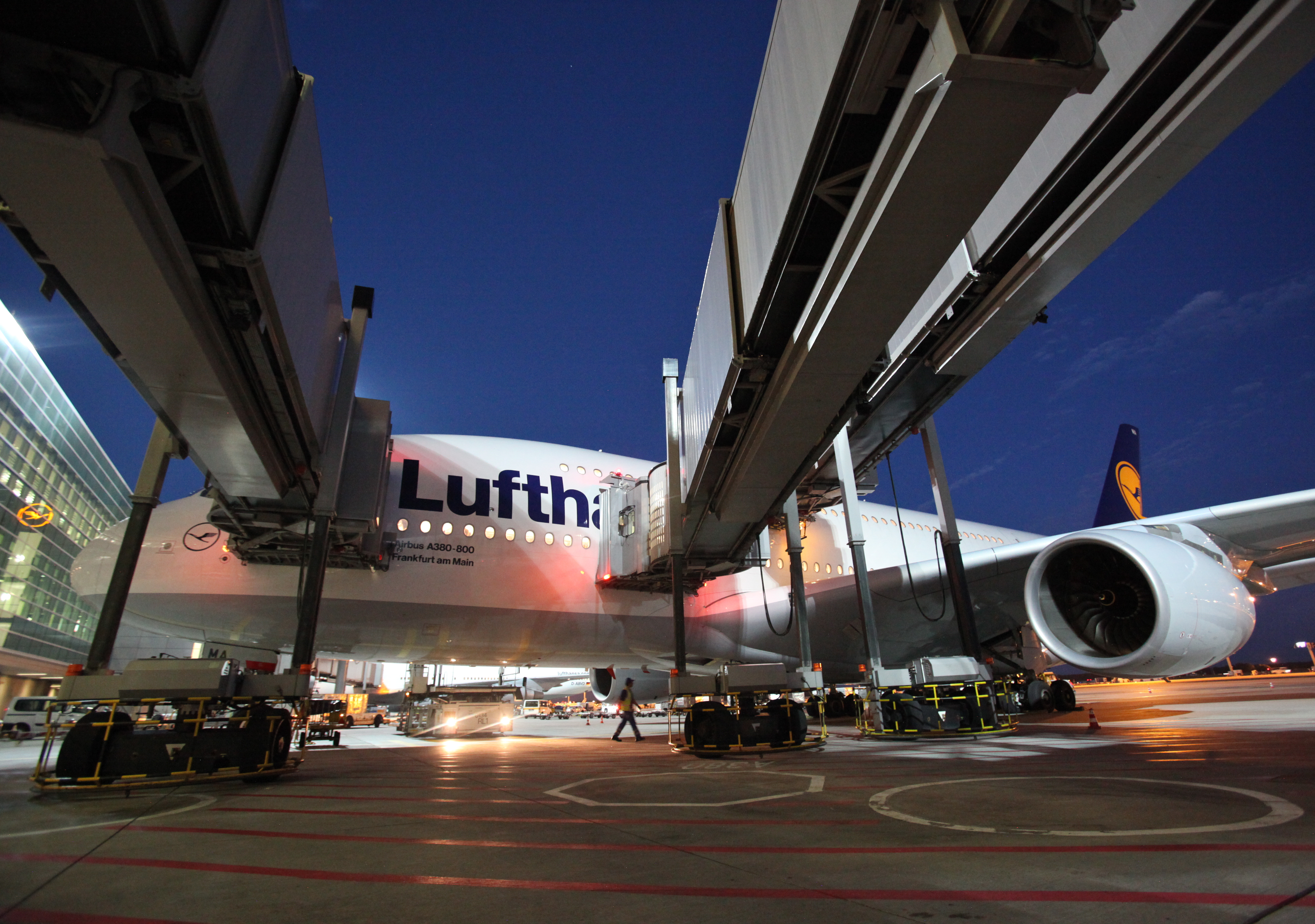
Three jet bridges feeding a Lufthansa Airbus A380 at Frankfurt Airport in Frankfurt, Germany in June 2011

Video of jet bridge being moved to an American Airlines plane at Toronto Pearson International Airport in Mississauga, Ontario, Canada

Before the introduction of jet bridges, passengers normally boarded an aircraft by walking along the ground-level ramp and climbing a set of movable stairs, or airstairs on aircraft so equipped. Mobile staircases or "ramp stairs" are employed at many airports around the world, particularly smaller airports, terminals supporting low cost carriers, and overflow using remote stands during peak travel demand at larger airports.

United Airlines tested an early prototype "Air Dock" in 1954. The first operational "Aero-Gangplank", as it was dubbed by inventor Lockheed Air Terminal, was installed by United at Chicago's O'Hare Airport in 1958.

== Advantages ==
Jet bridges provide all-weather dry access to aircraft and enhance the security of terminal operations. They are often permanently attached at one end by a pivot (or rotunda) to the terminal building and have the ability to swing left or right. The cabin, at the end of the loading bridge, may be raised or lowered, extended or retracted, and may pivot, to accommodate aircraft of different sizes. These motions are controlled by an operator's station in the cab. The cab is provided with an accordion-like canopy, which allows the bridge to dock with aircraft with differing shapes, and provide a nearly weather-proof seal. Additionally, many models offer leveling devices for the portion of the floor that makes contact with the aircraft; this allows passengers to slowly transition from level aircraft floor to sloping jet bridge floor. As such, jet bridges provide enhanced access to aircraft for passengers with many types of disabilities and mobility impairments, as they may board and disembark without climbing stairs or using a specialized wheelchair lift.

Some airports with international gates have two or even three bridges for larger aircraft with multiple entrances. In theory, this allows for faster disembarking of larger aircraft, though it is quite common, especially on aircraft such as Boeing 747s and Boeing 777s, to use one bridge for only passengers in first class and/or business class, while the other bridge is for the use of passengers in economy class. In some designs, the second jet bridge would even extend over the aircraft wing, being suspended from an overhead structure. This was, for example, originally adopted for most wide body gates at Amsterdam Airport Schiphol. The Airbus A380 is unique in that both of its two passenger decks have outside access doors and so using loading bridges for each deck is possible, having the advantage of faster aircraft loading (in parallel). Faster loading can lead to lower airport charges, fewer delays and more passenger throughput for the airport, all factors which impact an airline's bottom line.

Though loading bridges are usually permanently attached at their terminal-building end, leaving only the cab free to move, this is not always the case. Those at Melbourne Airport's international terminal, and at Hong Kong's former Kai Tak Airport, are anchored in the middle and movable at either end to permit the terminal building-end to be raised or lowered to connect with either the departures level or the arrivals level of the terminal building.

== Disadvantages ==
Jet bridges may occasionally collapse; incidents have happened at airports in Sydney, Hong Kong, Seattle, Los Angeles, Baltimore, and Islamabad, among others.

Airports frequently charge increased fees for using loading bridges on stands as opposed to mobile stairs; therefore low-cost airlines such as Ryanair have avoided using these wherever possible.

=== Marketing ===
Marketing space on jetways was uncommon until the early 2000s when HSBC launched their campaign "The World's Local Bank". Peter Stringham, head of marketing for HSBC worldwide, worked closely with Lowe's, the Group's global agency, in developing the campaign which required a single global platform. Stringham noticed jetways were a global medium which had not been tapped. HSBC thus bought the rights to jetways across major localities in 81 countries and territories.

== Gallery ==
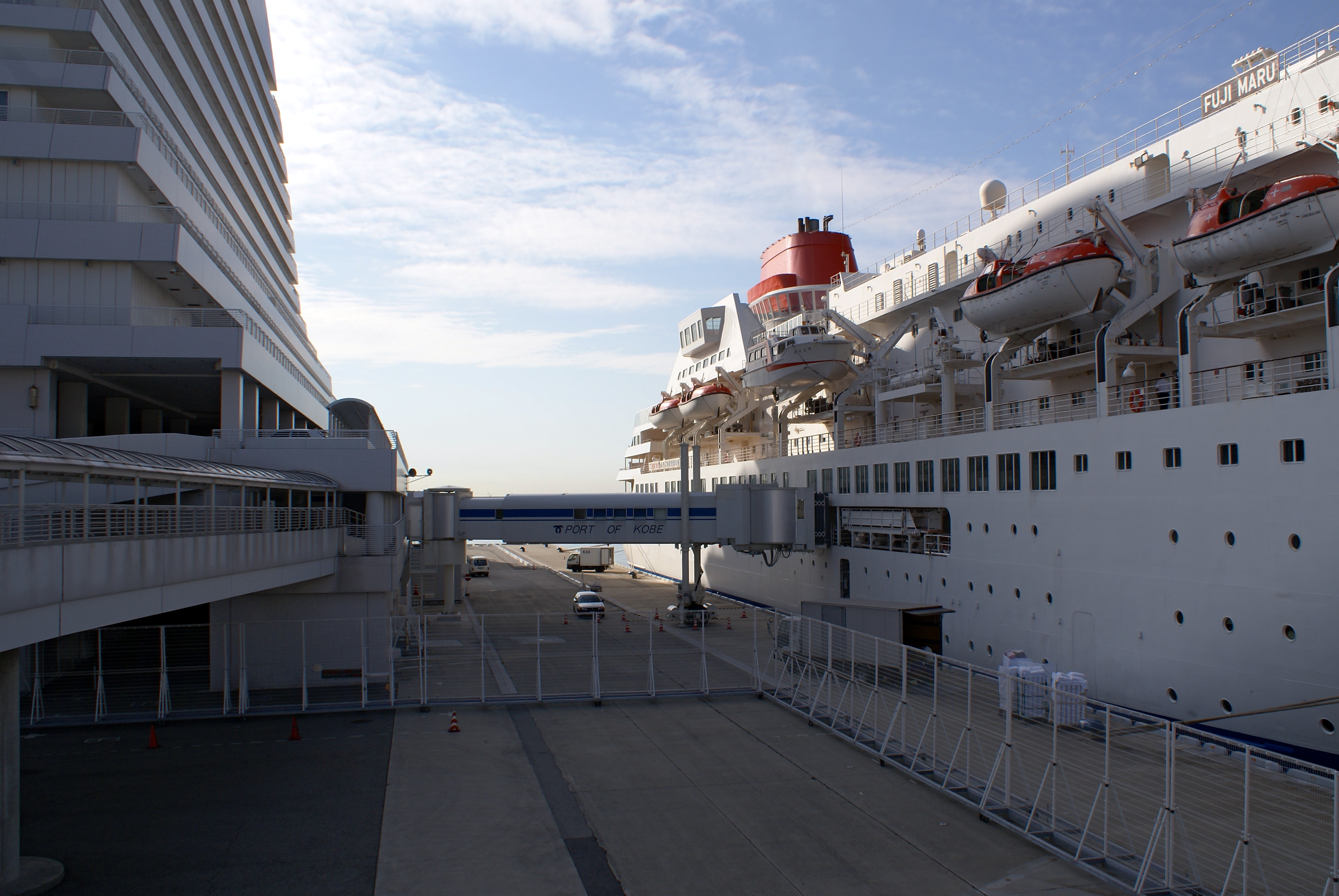
Adaptation of airport equipment for all-weather ship access, Kobe, Japan

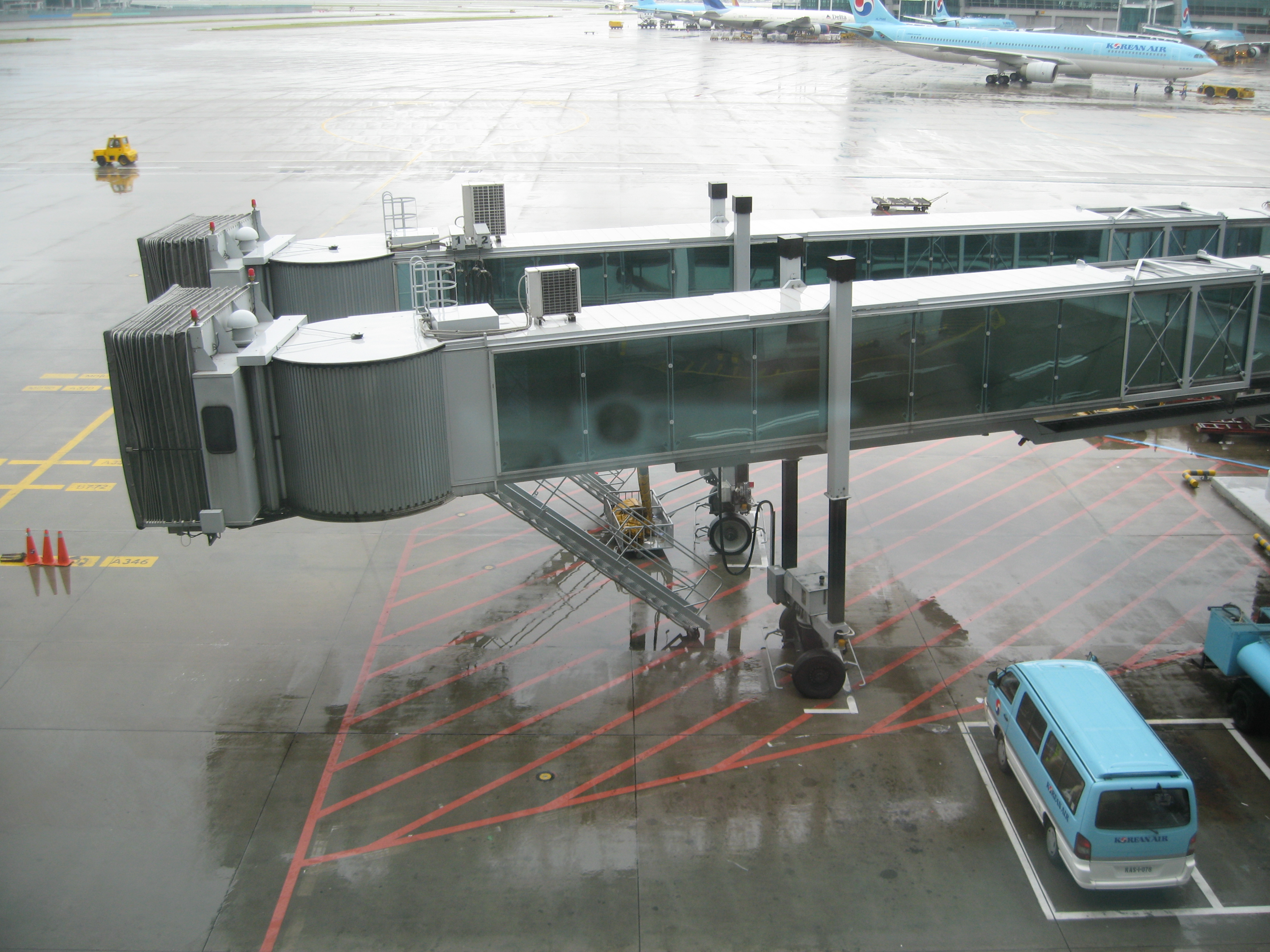
Note outboard gantry and driving wheels on a jet bridge at Incheon Airport, South Korea

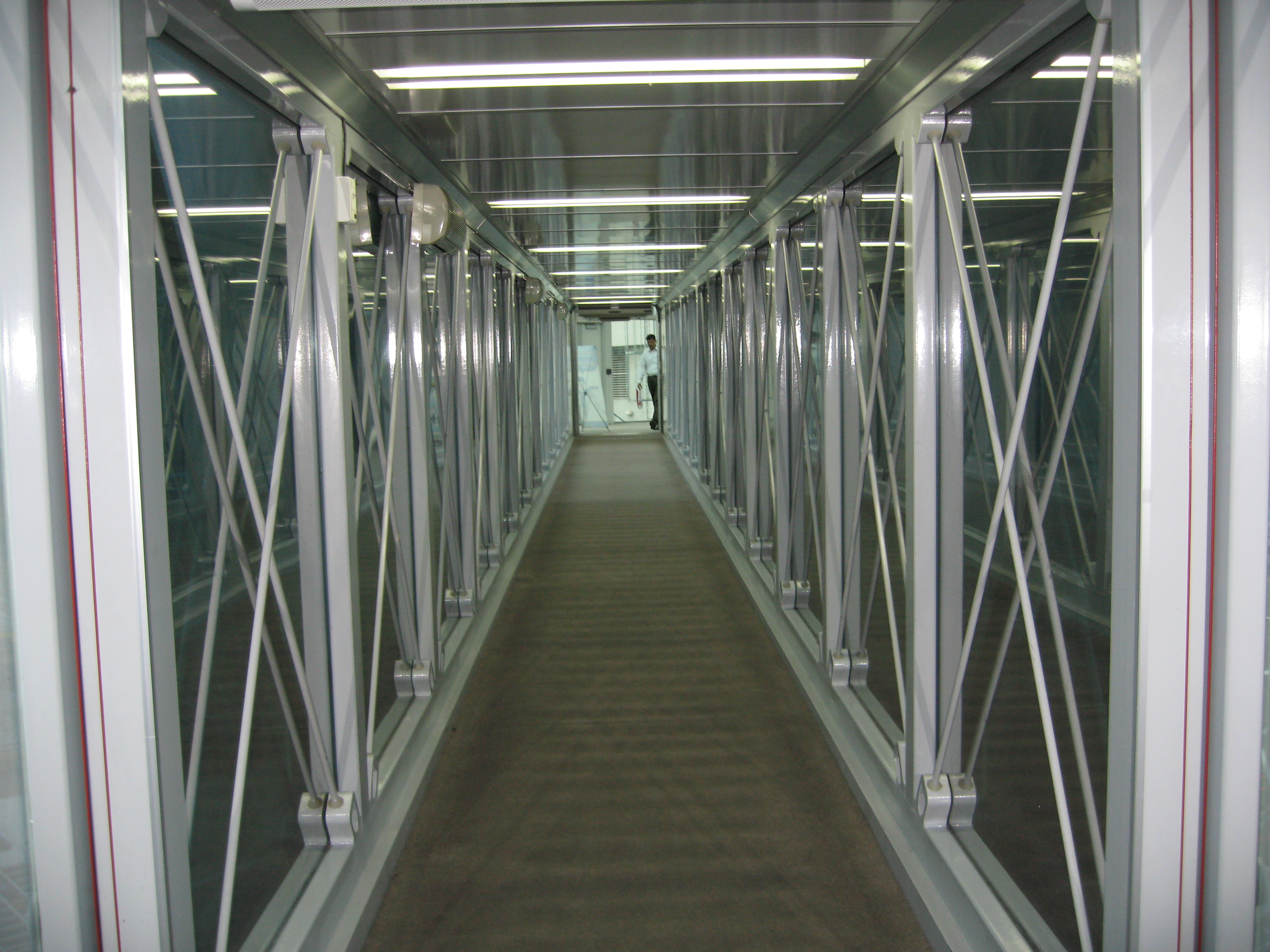
Interior of a modern glass-walled bridge at Incheon Airport, South Korea

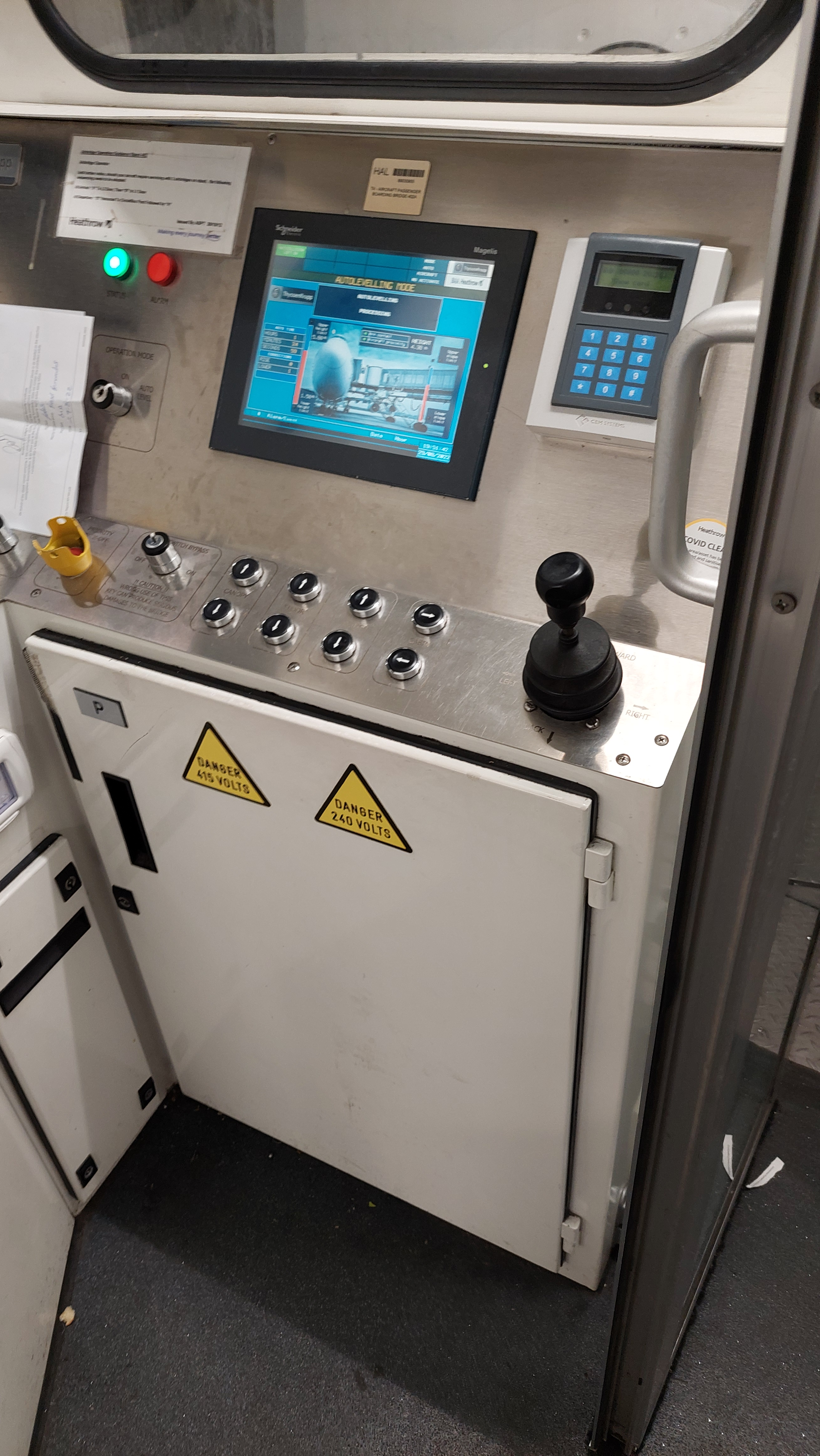
Control console

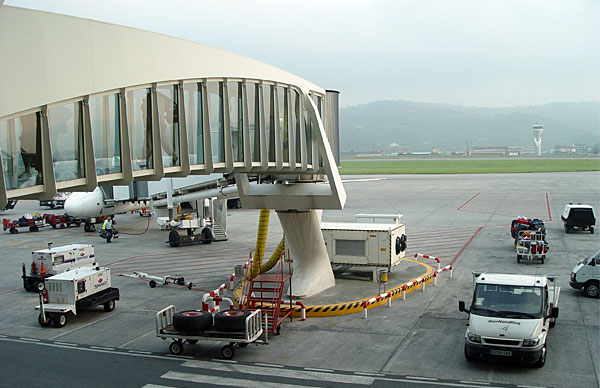
Jetway at Bilbao Airport in Spain; design by Santiago Calatrava

== See also ==
- Ground support equipment
- Mobile lounge
- Moveable bridges for a list of other moveable bridge types
