= Vendini =

Ticket software for live events (2001–2020)

Vendini was established in 2001 as a ticket software for live events. The company is headquartered in San Francisco, United States and serves clients across North America.

In 2019 Vendini was acquired by AudienceView and the product was rebranded as AudienceView Select.

In July 2020 AudienceView announced that they were deprecating AudienceView Select (Vendini) and migrating customers to AudienceView Professional.

== Product offering ==
Vendini offered various products for live event venues, including mobile applications for iOS devices: TicketAgent, which allowed venues to sell tickets, and TicketScan, which allowed venues to scan tickets and control access. Walletini was a mobile app for iOS and Android created by Vendini that acted as a passbook for any and all tickets purchased online for live events.

Along with software, Vendini offered hardware for customers including mobile laser scanners, charging stations, credit card readers, cash drawers, thermal ticket printers, ticket stock and customer support services.

== History ==
Vendini was founded in 2001 by Mark Tacchi, who started the company with no outside funding. Tacchi began developing the original Vendini software from a mountain house in Tahoe, California, on a card table in-between snowboarding sessions. Initially directed primarily at theaters and playhouses, Vendini expanded into the live music, music and arts festival, casino and sporting event spaces and more.

Tacchi began his career at NeXT and Apple, Inc., and went on to found a software company called Hipbone in 1999. Hipbone was acquired in 2004 by KANA.

In 2016, Vendini reached $2 billion in gross sales, 17 months after hitting its first billion.

== Acquisitions ==
In 2011, Vendini acquired Dataflow Workspace, a software that helps manage the backend aspects of music and arts festivals. Dataflow Workspace was built by Dataflow Enterprises, a company based in Knoxville, Tennessee. As a part of the acquisition, Vendini brought on Robby Black, CEO and founder of Dataflow Enterprises, as Director of Festival Solutions.

In 2014, Vendini acquired In Ticketing, a company based in Sebastopol, California. In Ticketing was founded in 2001 by Steve Weisz, and was a provider of online ticketing services and box office software that had a strong focus on live music venues. Vendini brought Weisz onto the team as the head of Business Development for its Live Music division.

In 2015, Vendini acquired CrowdTorch, a consumer ticket solution and live event platform based in Santa Monica, California. The company, previously owned by Cvent, also hosted several consumer portals such as LaughStub, ElectroStub and TuneStub.

== Awards and recognition ==
In November 2014, Vendini announced that it joined the PCI Security Council as a Participating Organization. As Participating Organization, Vendini worked with the council to achieve and improve payment data security worldwide through the ongoing development of PCI standards.

Vendini was also added to the Deloitte Fast 500 2014, a ranking of the 500 fastest growing technology, media, telecommunications, life sciences and clean technology companies in North America. Technology Fast 500 award winners are selected based on percentage fiscal year revenue growth from 2009 to 2013.
