= Duria =

Duria may refer to:

- river Dora Baltea in northwestern Italy, known in Latin as Duria maior, Duria Baltica and Duria Bautica.
- river Dora Riparia flowing from France to the Po in Italy, known in Latin as Duria minor.
- Düren, a town in Germany, appearing as villa duria in Frankish annals
- Duria Antiquior, a more ancient Dorset, several paintings depicting prehistoric animals.
- Duria, the mascot of the 2002 Asian Games in Busan, South Korea.
