= Henry Dinham Chard =

English shipbuilder (1760–1847)

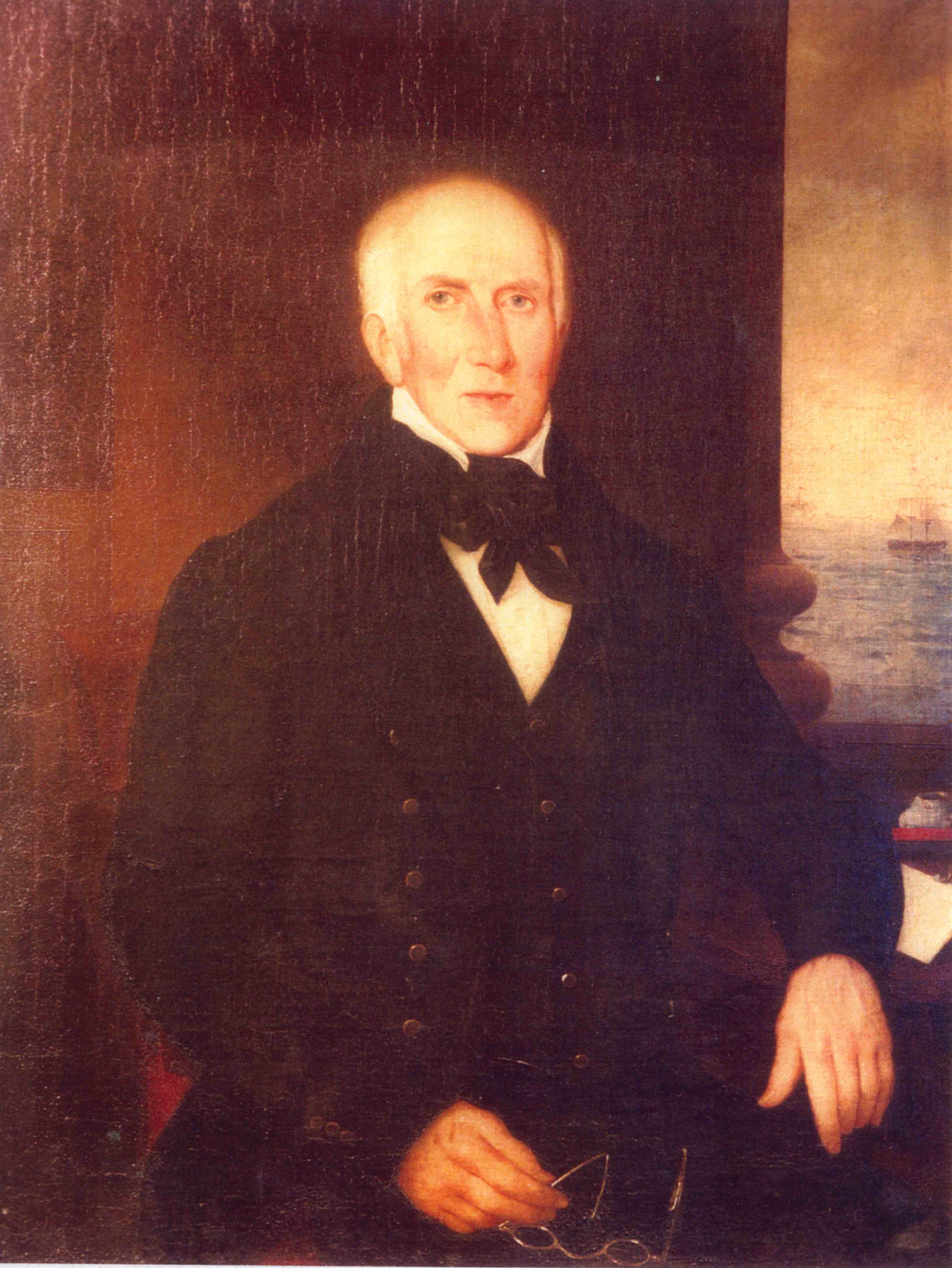
- Portrait of Henry Dinham Chard (Lyme Regis Museum)
- Born: 1760; Chideock, Dorset, England
- Died: 22 December 1847; Brixton, London, England
- Occupations: Shipbuilder, ship-owner
- Years active: ca. 1782–1812
- Known for: Establishing the first major shipyard at Lyme Regis; builder of brigs, privateers, cutters and luggers

Henry Dinham Chard (1760 – 22 December 1847) was an English shipbuilder and ship-owner who established the first major shipyard at Lyme Regis in Dorset. Over a career spanning three decades, he built and launched dozens of vessels—including sloops, luggers, cutters and brigs—valuably contributing to the economy of Lyme Regis.

== Early life ==
Chard was born in Chideock, Dorset, in 1760, the son of John Chard of Ilminster and Mary Dinham of Ruishton, Somerset. After his father's death, his mother kept the Red Lion Inn at Chideock. At the age of fifteen he was apprenticed for seven years to Nicholas Bools, a Bridport shipbuilder, where he learned the trade.

== Shipbuilding at Lyme Regis ==
After completing his apprenticeship, Chard worked at the Royal Dockyard at Plymouth from April 1782 to February 1783 where he acquired knowledge of cutting-edge developments in rigging design. He then established his own yard at Lyme Regis, launching the 40 ton sloop, Flora in 1784. From 1785 to 1791 his yard was at its busiest, producing nineteen ships including the 111-ton brigantine Neptune. The largest recorded ship built by Chard, the Mary Ann at 116 tons, was launched in 1812 towards the end of Chard's time at Lyme Regis and had 13 owners over its 44-year service. It is the subject of an impressive painting (1851) by A Beattie, showing the ship in trouble and narrowly escaping disaster in a storm off Lyme Regis.

Chard was regarded locally as an innovator and a builder of fast, seaworthy craft. (Note: An advertisement of March 1803 announced the forthcoming launch and sale of one of his vessels, with the claim that it is "strong, and can sail fast".) The Morning Chronicle obituary observed that "even in these days of advanced mechanical skill, the means which he suggested and adopted half a century since are still in use with hardly any variation." Chard frequently assisted in refloating stranded ships along the Dorset and Devon coasts, often without payment. During the Napoleonic Wars he carried government stores to the Channel Islands, losing several uninsured vessels to French privateers and ultimately suffering financial ruin.

== Later life ==
Chard married Elizabeth Stocker in 1797 and had 11 children between 1798 and 1819. Following the death of his mother in 1807, Chard managed the sale of her well-known inn, the Red Lion at Chideock, acting as agent for the estate. He gradually withdrew from shipbuilding and later relocated with his wife Elizabeth and their children to London. He continued to face financial difficulties arising from his wartime losses but, initially at least, remained active within maritime circles. He died in London on 22 December 1847 (quoted as being in the 88 year of his age).

== Legacy ==
Chard is regarded as the first major shipbuilder of Lyme Regis and a key figure in the town's maritime heritage. His portrait occupies a prominent position at the Lyme Regis Museum, which also holds records of his vessels and related documents. Peter Lacey describes him as "the foremost figure of the town's brief but energetic age of shipbuilding."
