= Shelley Emling =

American journalist and author

Shelley Emling (born 1965) is an American journalist and author of several books. She has worked as a foreign correspondent and also has had editorial positions.

Born in Missouri, she grew up in Dallas, Texas. She went to the University of Texas and started her journalism career at United Press International (UPI).

== Career ==
Emling started her journalism career working an early shift for UPI. She also worked for smaller newspapers, hoping to move up.

She began to work as a foreign correspondent for Cox Newspapers, covering Latin America for three years. She moved to London, from where she covered UK and European news for several years.

Her work has also appeared in The New York Times, Fortune, USA Today, and the International Herald Tribune.

In 2009, Emling and her family returned to the United States, moving from London to Montclair, New Jersey. In 2010 she became editor for AOL’s Patch.

She served as the senior editor of Huff/Post50, The Huffington Post site for those 50 and older.

Emling is the Executive Editor, Specialized Content, at the American Association of Retired Persons (AARP). She also is editor-in-chief of "The Girlfriend" and "The Ethel" newsletters, both published by AARP. She oversees editorial on AARP's brand Instagram account as well as The Girlfriend Book Club.

== Books ==
Emling has written and published several books, mostly biographies of remarkable women.

- The Fossil Hunter (2009) was published by Macmillan. This is about the notable English paleontologist Mary Anning, whom Emling had first learned of while on holiday in England.

The New York Times noted that Emling took a journalistic approach but too often speculated about events that might have happened. The reviewer noted that her ample footnotes put the subject's work "into the scientific and sociological context".

Nature said that Emling's "diligent" work was "more thorough and complete" than Tracy Chevalier's novel about Anning's life, Remarkable Creatures (2009), published nearly at the same time. The reviewer noted, however, that the freedom of the fictional account was more engaging for a reader.

- "Marie Curie and Her Daughters: The Private Lives of Science's First Family" (2013) was published by Palgrave Macmillan.
- Setting the World on Fire: The Brief, Astonishing Life of St. Catherine of Siena (2016)
- A Forgotten Hero: Folke Bernadotte, the Swedish Humanitarian Who Rescued 30,000 People from the Nazis (2019)
- How to Retire in Mexico
