= Mary Anning =

English fossil collector and palaeontologist (1799–1847)

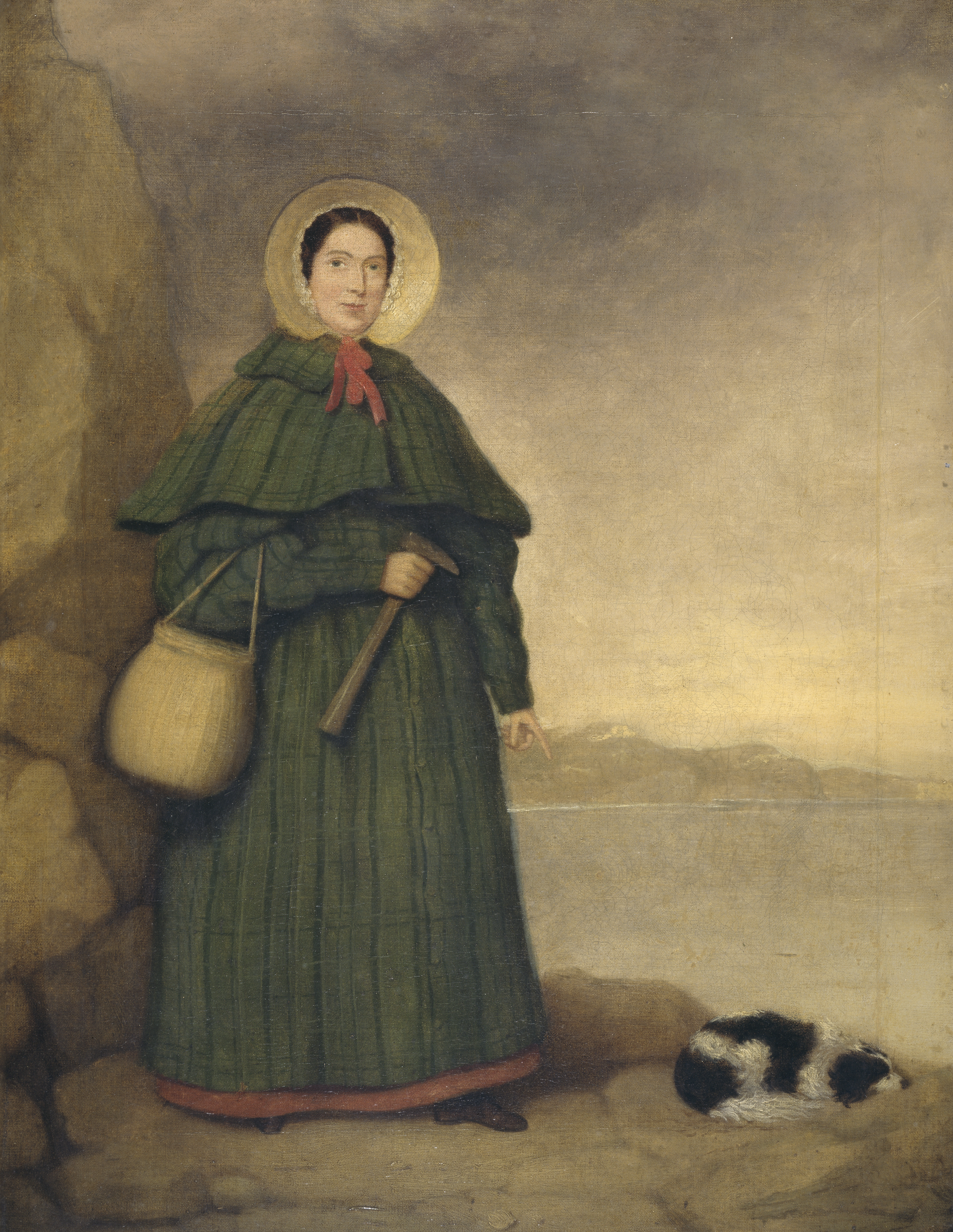
- Anning with her dog, Tray, painted before 1842; the hill Golden Cap can be seen in the background.
- Born: 21 May 1799; Lyme Regis, Dorset, England
- Died: 9 March 1847 (aged 47); Lyme Regis, Dorset, England
- Resting place: St Michael's Church, Lyme Regis; 50°43′33″N 2°55′53″W
- Occupations: Fossil collector; palaeontologist

Mary Anning (21 May 1799 – 9 March 1847) was an English fossil collector, dealer, and palaeontologist. She became known internationally for her discoveries in Jurassic marine fossil beds in the cliffs along the English Channel at Lyme Regis in the county of Dorset, South West England. Anning's findings contributed to changes in scientific thinking about prehistoric life and the history of the Earth.

Anning searched for fossils in the area's Blue Lias and Charmouth Mudstone cliffs, particularly during the winter months when landslides exposed new fossils that had to be collected quickly before they were lost to the sea. Her discoveries included the first correctly identified ichthyosaur skeleton when she was twelve years old; the first two nearly complete plesiosaur skeletons; the first pterosaur skeleton located outside Germany; and fish fossils. Her observations played a key role in the discovery that coprolites, known as bezoar stones at the time, were fossilised faeces, and she also discovered that belemnite fossils contained fossilised ink sacs like those of modern cephalopods.

Anning struggled financially for much of her life. As a woman, she was not eligible to join the Geological Society of London, and she did not always receive full credit for her scientific contributions. However, her friend, geologist Henry De la Beche, who painted Duria Antiquior, the first widely circulated pictorial representation of a scene from prehistoric life derived from fossil reconstructions, based it largely on fossils Anning had found and sold prints of it for her benefit.

Anning became well known in geological circles in Britain, Europe, and America, and was consulted on issues of anatomy as well as fossil collecting. The only scientific writing of hers published in her lifetime appeared in the Magazine of Natural History in 1839, an extract from a letter that Anning had written to the magazine's editor questioning one of its claims. After her death in 1847, Anning's unusual life story attracted increasing interest.

== Life and career ==
=== Early childhood ===
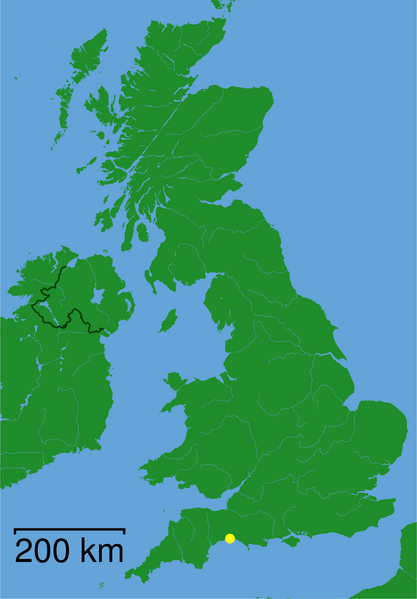
Lyme Regis, Dorset

Mary Anning was born in Lyme Regis in Dorset, England, on 21 May 1799. Her father, Richard Anning, was a cabinetmaker and carpenter who supplemented his income by mining the coastal cliff-side fossil beds near the town, and selling his finds to tourists; her mother was Mary Moore, known as Molly. Anning's parents married on 8 August 1793 in Blandford Forum and moved to Lyme, living in a house built on the town's bridge. They attended the Dissenter chapel on Coombe Street, whose worshippers initially called themselves independents and later became known as Congregationalists. The family lived so near to the sea that the same storms that swept along the cliffs to reveal the fossils sometimes flooded the Annings' home, on one occasion forcing them to crawl out of an upstairs bedroom window to avoid drowning.

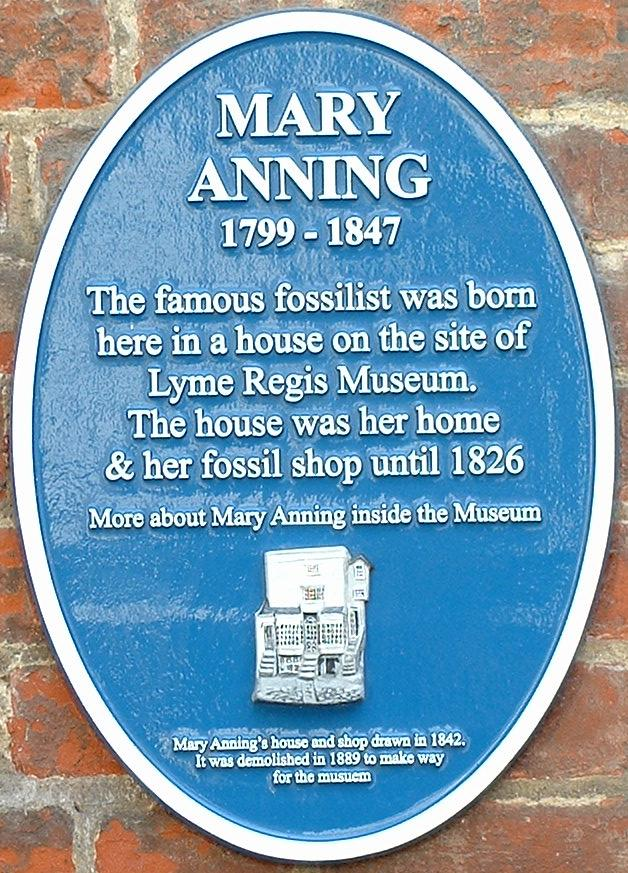
Blue plaque where Mary Anning was born and had her first fossil shop, now the Lyme Regis Museum

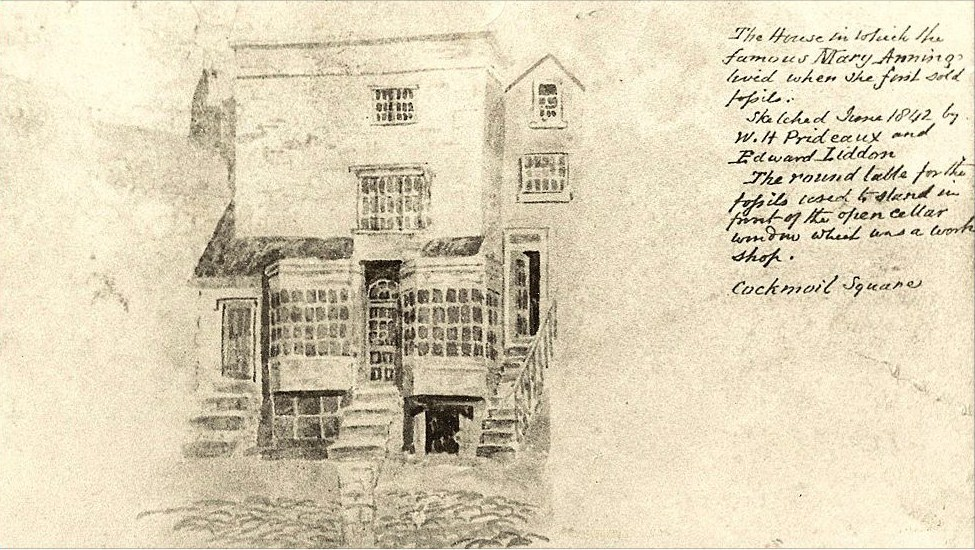
1842 sketch of Anning's house

Molly and Richard had ten children. The first child, also Mary, was born in 1794. She was followed by another daughter, who died almost at once; Joseph in 1796; and another son in 1798, who died in infancy. In December that year, the oldest child, (the first Mary) then four years old, died after her clothes caught fire, possibly while adding wood shavings to the fire. The incident was reported in the Bath Chronicle on 27 December 1798: "A child, four years of age of Mr. R. Anning, a cabinetmaker of Lyme, was left by the mother for about five minutes ... in a room where there were some shavings ... The girl's clothes caught fire and she was so dreadfully burnt as to cause her death."

When Anning was born five months later, she was thus named Mary after her dead sister. More children were born after her, but none of them survived more than a year or two. Only the second Mary Anning and her brother Joseph, who was three years older than her, survived to adulthood. The high child mortality rate for the Anning family was not unusual. Almost half the children born in the UK in the 19th century died before the age of five, and in the crowded living conditions of early 19th-century Lyme Regis, infant deaths from diseases like smallpox and measles were common.

On 19 August 1800, when Anning was 15 months old, an event occurred that became part of local lore. She was being held by a neighbour, Elizabeth Haskings, who was standing with two other women under an elm tree watching an equestrian show being put on by a travelling company of horsemen when lightning struck the tree—killing all three women below. Onlookers rushed the infant home, where she was revived in a bath of hot water. A local doctor declared her survival miraculous. Anning's family said she had been a sickly baby before the event, but afterwards she seemed to blossom. For years afterwards, members of her community would attribute the child's curiosity, intelligence and lively personality to the incident.

Anning's education was extremely limited, but she was able to attend a Congregationalist Sunday school, where she learned to read and write. Congregationalist doctrine, unlike that of the Church of England at the time, emphasised the importance of education for the poor. Her prized possession was a bound volume of the Dissenters' Theological Magazine and Review, in which the family's pastor, the Reverend James Wheaton, had published two essays, one insisting that God had created the world in six days, the other urging dissenters to study the new science of geology.

=== Fossils as a family business ===
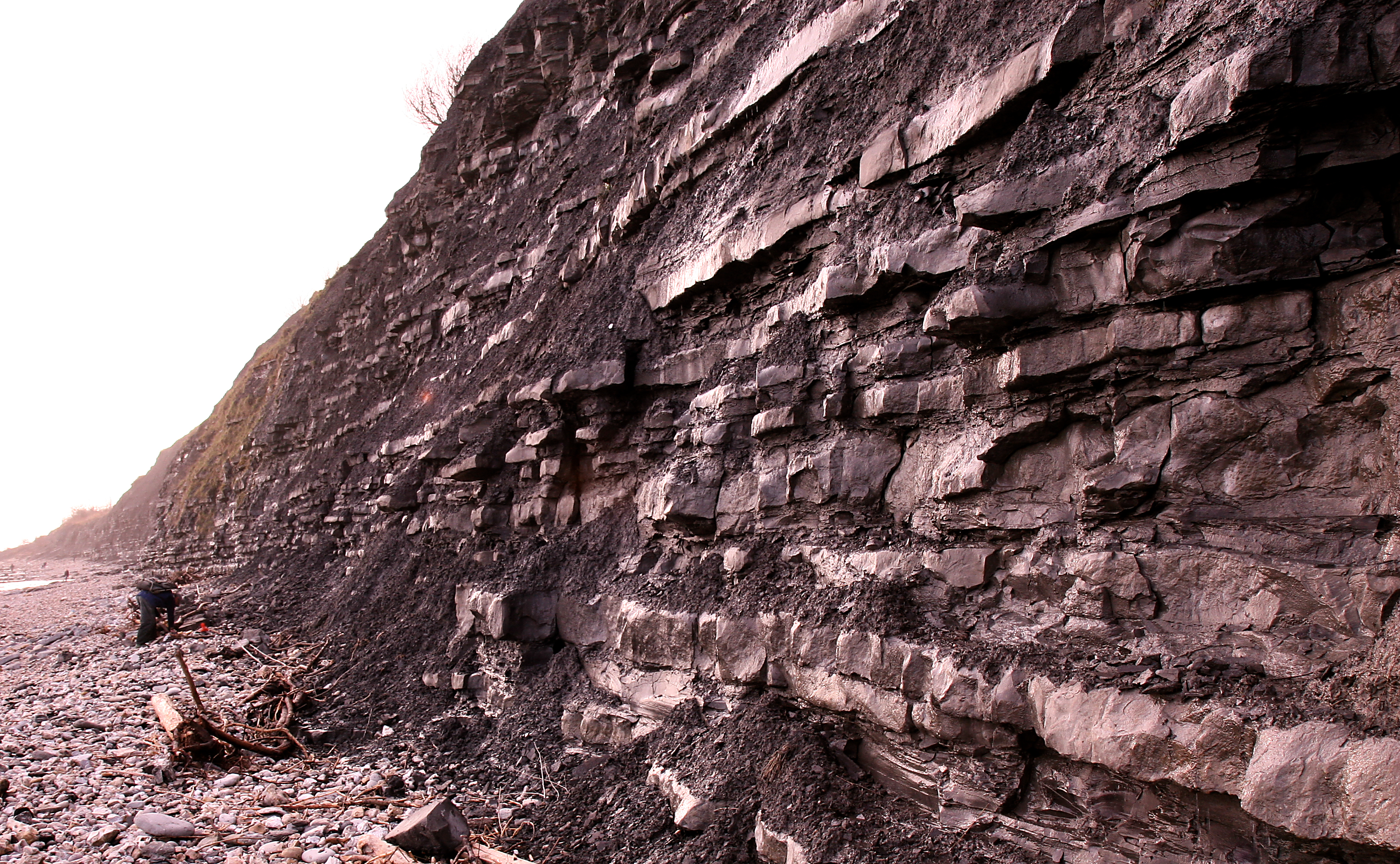
Blue Lias cliffs, Lyme Regis

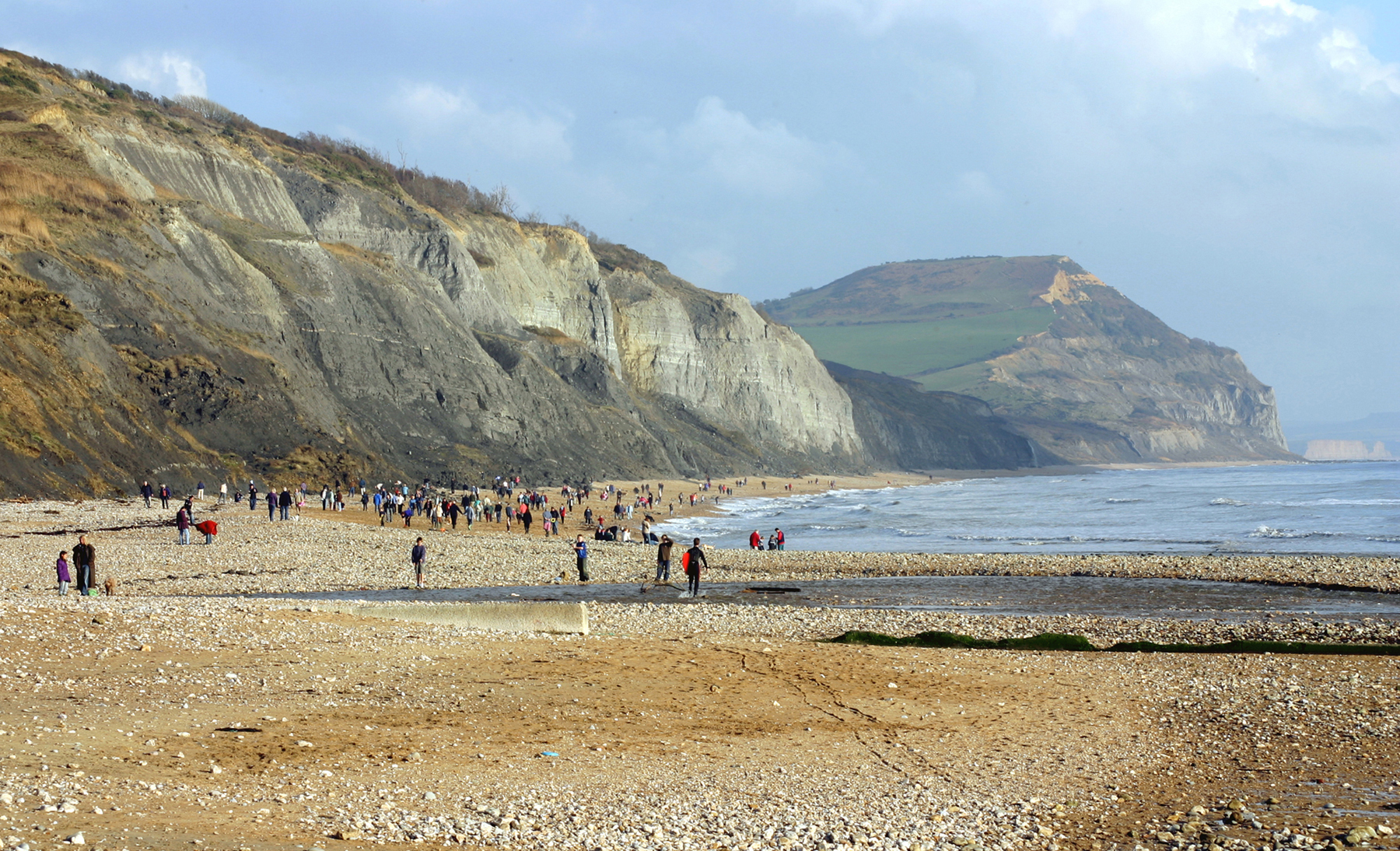
The Jurassic coast at Charmouth, Dorset, where the Annings made some of their finds. The hill in the background is Golden Cap.

By the late 18th century, Lyme Regis had become a popular seaside resort, especially after 1792 when the outbreak of the French Revolutionary Wars made travel to the European mainland dangerous for the English gentry, and increasing numbers of wealthy and middle-class tourists were arriving there. Even before Anning's time, locals supplemented their income by selling what were called "curios" to visitors. These were fossils with colourful local names such as "snake-stones" (ammonites), "devil's fingers" (belemnites), and "verteberries" (vertebrae), to which were sometimes attributed medicinal and mystical properties. Fossil collecting was in vogue in the late 18th and early 19th century, at first as a pastime, but gradually transforming into a science as the importance of fossils to geology and biology was understood. The source of most of these fossils was the coastal cliffs around Lyme Regis, part of a geological formation known as the Blue Lias. This consists of alternating layers of limestone and shale, laid down as sediment on a shallow seabed early in the Jurassic period (about 210–195 million years ago). It is one of the richest fossil locations in Britain. The cliffs could be dangerously unstable, however, especially in winter when rain weakened them, causing landslides. It was precisely during the winter months that collectors were drawn to the cliffs because the landslides often exposed new fossils.

Their father, Richard, often took Mary and her brother Joseph on fossil-hunting expeditions to supplement the family's income, with Mary starting to join even as a young child of five or six years. They offered their discoveries for sale to tourists on a table outside their home. This was a difficult time for England's poor; the French Revolutionary Wars, and the Napoleonic Wars that followed, caused food shortages. The price of wheat almost tripled between 1792 and 1812, but wages for the working class remained almost unchanged. In Dorset, the rising price of bread caused political unrest, even riots. At one point, Richard Anning was involved in organising a protest against food shortages.

In addition, the family's status as religious dissenters—not followers of the Church of England—attracted discrimination. In the earlier 19th century, those who refused to subscribe to the Articles of the Church of England were still not allowed to study at Oxford or Cambridge or to take certain positions in the army, and were excluded by law from several professions. Anning's father had been suffering from tuberculosis and injuries he suffered from a fall off a cliff, contributing to his death in November 1810, aged 44. He left the family with debts and no savings, forcing them to apply for poor relief.

The family continued collecting and selling fossils together and set up a table of curiosities near the coach stop at a local inn. Although the stories about Anning tend to focus on her successes, Dennis Dean writes that her mother and brother were astute collectors too, and Anning's parents had sold fossils before the father's death.

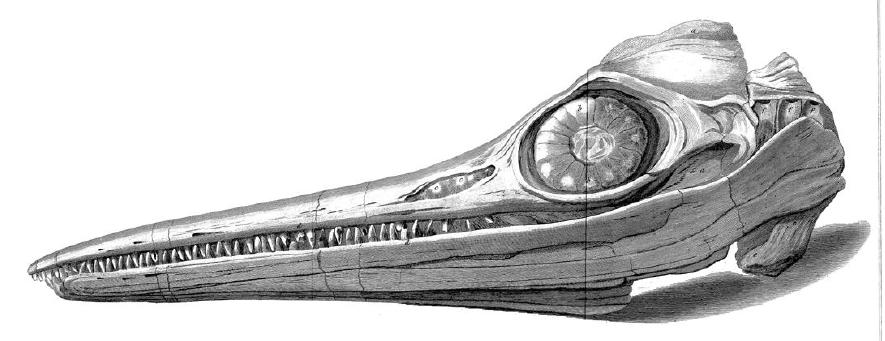
Drawing from an 1814 paper by Everard Home showing the skull of Temnodontosaurus platyodon (previously Ichthyosaurus platyodon) (NHMUK PV R 1158) found by Joseph Anning in 1811

Their first well-known find was in 1811 when Mary Anning was 12; her brother Joseph dug up a 4-foot (1.22 metre) ichthyosaur skull, and a few months later in 1812, Anning herself found the rest of the skeleton, which turned out to be over 5 yards (4.57 metres) in length. Henry Hoste Henley of Sandringham House in Sandringham, Norfolk, who was lord of the manor of Colway, near Lyme Regis, paid the family about £23 for it, and in turn he sold it to William Bullock, a well-known collector, who displayed it in London. There it generated interest, as public awareness of the age of the Earth and the variety of prehistoric creatures was growing. It was later sold for £45 and five shillings at auction in May 1819 as a "Crocodile in a Fossil State" to Charles Konig, of the British Museum, who had already suggested the name Ichthyosaurus for it.

Anning's mother Molly initially ran the fossil business after her husband Richard's death, but it is unclear how much actual fossil collecting Molly did herself. As late as 1821, Molly wrote to the British Museum to request payment for a specimen. Her son Joseph's time was increasingly taken up by his apprenticeship to an upholsterer, but he remained active in the fossil business until at least 1825. By that time, Mary Anning had assumed the leading role in the family specimen business.

=== Birch auction ===
The family's keenest customer was Lieutenant-Colonel Thomas James Birch, later Bosvile, a wealthy collector from Lincolnshire, who bought several specimens from them. In 1820 Birch became disturbed by the family's poverty. Having made no major discoveries for a year, they were at the point of having to sell their furniture to pay the rent. So he decided to auction on their behalf the fossils he had purchased from them. He wrote to the palaeontologist Gideon Mantell on 5 March that year to say that the sale was "for the benefit of the poor woman and her son and daughter at Lyme, who have in truth found almost all the fine things which have been submitted to scientific investigation ... I may never again possess what I am about to part with, yet in doing it I shall have the satisfaction of knowing that the money will be well applied." The auction was held at Bullocks in London on 15 May 1820, and raised £400 (equivalent to £33,000 in 2025). How much of that was given to the Annings is not known, but it seems to have placed the family on a steadier financial footing, and with buyers arriving from Paris and Vienna, the three-day event raised the family's profile within the geological community.

=== Fossil shop and growing expertise in a risky occupation ===
Anning continued to support herself selling fossils. Her primary stock in trade consisted of invertebrate fossils such as ammonite and belemnite shells, which were common in the area and sold for a few shillings. Vertebrate fossils, such as ichthyosaur skeletons, sold for more, but were much rarer. Collecting them was dangerous winter work. In 1823, an article in The Bristol Mirror said of her:

This persevering female has for years gone daily in search of fossil remains of importance at every tide, for many miles under the hanging cliffs at Lyme, whose fallen masses are her immediate object, as they alone contain these valuable relics of a former world, which must be snatched at the moment of their fall, at the continual risk of being crushed by the half suspended fragments they leave behind, or be left to be destroyed by the returning tide: – to her exertions we owe nearly all the fine specimens of Ichthyosauri of the great collections ...

The risks of Anning's profession were illustrated when in October 1833 she barely avoided being killed by a landslide that buried her black-and-white terrier, Tray, her constant companion when she went collecting. Anning wrote to a friend, Charlotte Murchison, in November of that year: "Perhaps you will laugh when I say that the death of my old faithful dog has quite upset me, the cliff that fell upon him and killed him in a moment before my eyes, and close to my feet ... it was but a moment between me and the same fate."

As Anning continued to make important finds, her reputation grew. On 10 December 1823, she found the first complete Plesiosaurus, and in 1828 the first British example of the flying reptiles known as pterosaurs, called a flying dragon when it was displayed at the British Museum, followed by a Squaloraja fish skeleton in 1829. Despite her limited education, she read as much of the scientific literature as she could obtain, and often laboriously hand-copied papers borrowed from others. Palaeontologist Christopher McGowan examined a copy Anning made of an 1824 paper by William Conybeare on marine reptile fossils and noted that the copy included several pages of her detailed technical illustrations that he was hard-pressed to tell apart from the original. She also dissected modern animals including both fish and cuttlefish to gain a better understanding of the anatomy of some of the fossils with which she was working. Lady Harriet Silvester, the widow of the former Recorder of the City of London, visited Lyme in 1824 and described Anning in her diary:

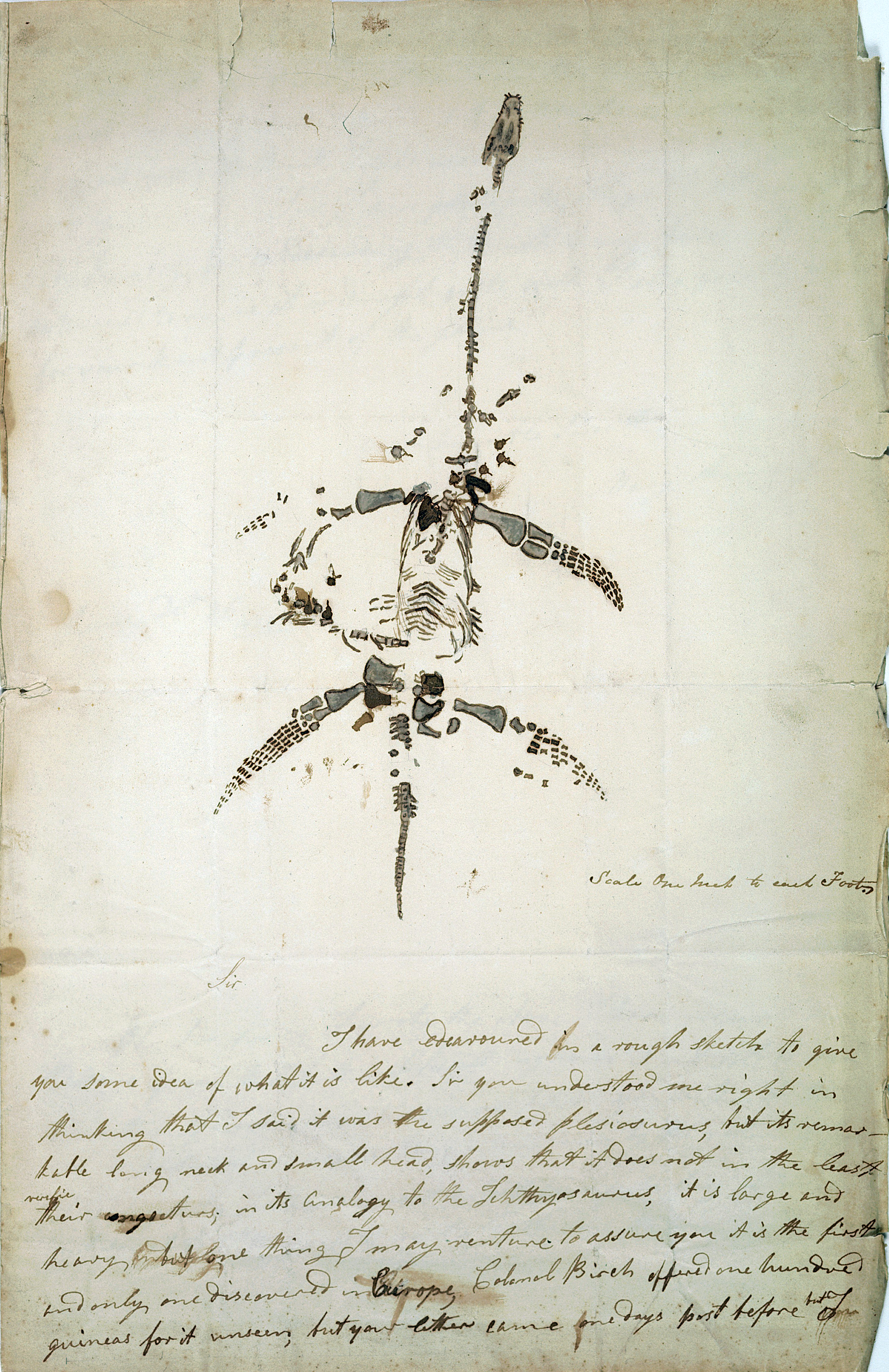
Letter and drawing from Mary Anning announcing the discovery of a fossil animal now known as Plesiosaurus dolichodeirus (specimen NHMUK OR PV 22656), 26 December 1823

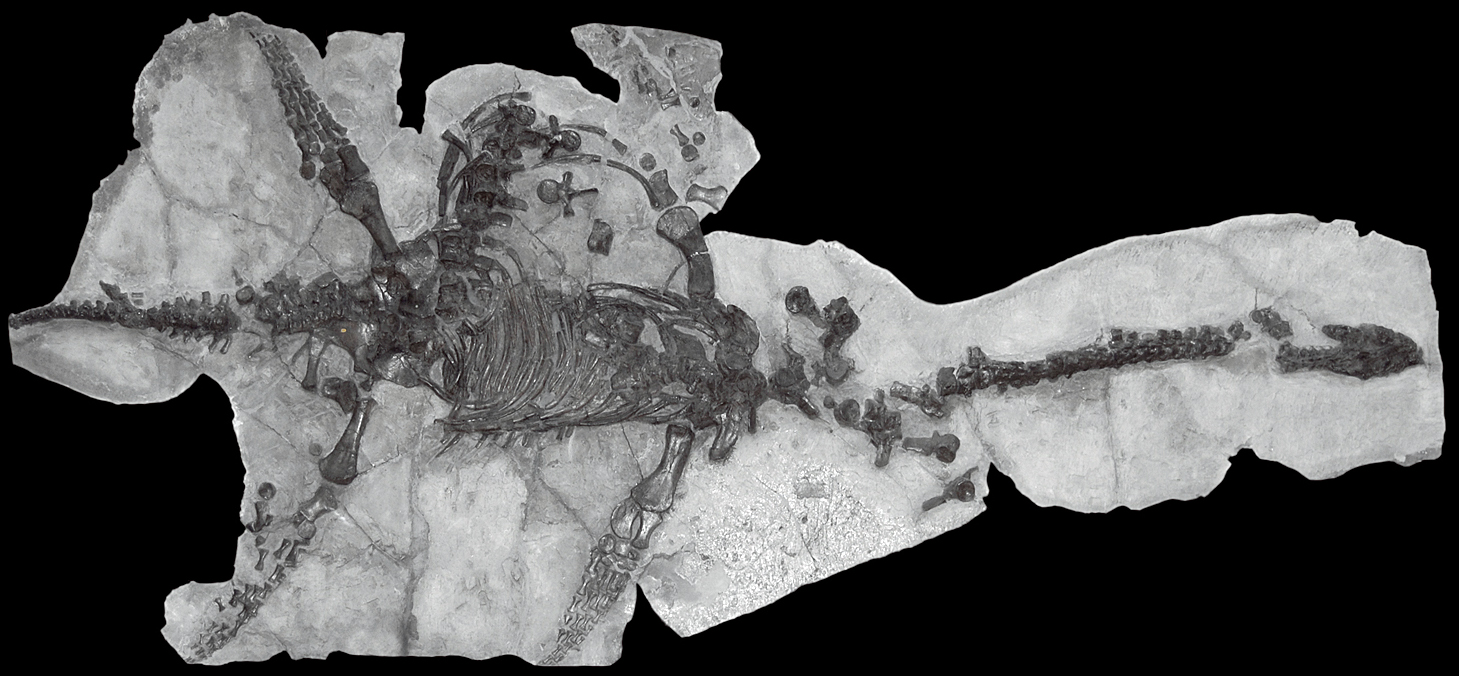
Mary Anning's plesiosaur: specimen NHMUK PV OR 22656 of Plesiosaurus dolichodeirus

The extraordinary thing in this young woman is that she has made herself so thoroughly acquainted with the science that the moment she finds any bones she knows to what tribe they belong. She fixes the bones on a frame with cement and then makes drawings and has them engraved... It is certainly a wonderful instance of divine favour—that this poor, ignorant girl should be so blessed, for by reading and application she has arrived to that degree of knowledge as to be in the habit of writing and talking with professors and other clever men on the subject, and they all acknowledge that she understands more of the science than anyone else in this kingdom.

In 1826, aged 27, Anning managed to save enough money to purchase a house with a glass store-front window for her shop, Anning's Fossil Depot. The business had become important enough that the move was covered in the local paper, which noted that the shop had a fine ichthyosaur skeleton on display. Many geologists and fossil collectors from Europe and America visited her at Lyme, including the geologist George William Featherstonhaugh, who called Anning a "very clever funny Creature". He purchased fossils from Anning for the newly opened New York Lyceum of Natural History in 1827. King Frederick Augustus II of Saxony visited her shop in 1844 and purchased an ichthyosaur skeleton for his extensive natural history collection. The king's physician and aide, Carl Gustav Carus, wrote in his journal:

We had alighted from the carriage and were proceeding on foot, when we fell in with a shop in which the most remarkable petrifications and fossil remains—the head of an Ichthyosaurus—beautiful ammonites, etc. were exhibited in the window. We entered and found the small shop and adjoining chamber completely filled with fossil productions of the coast ... I found in the shop a large slab of blackish clay, in which a perfect Ichthyosaurus of at least six feet, was embedded. This specimen would have been a great acquisition for many of the cabinets of natural history on the Continent, and I consider the price demanded, £15 sterling, as very moderate.

Carus asked Anning to write her name and address in his pocketbook for future reference—she wrote it as "Mary Annins"—and when she handed it back to him she told him: "I am well known throughout the whole of Europe". As time passed, Anning's confidence in her knowledge grew, and in 1839 she wrote to the Magazine of Natural History to question the claim made in an article, that a recently discovered fossil of the prehistoric shark Hybodus represented a new genus, as an error since she had discovered the existence of fossil sharks with both straight and hooked teeth many years ago. The extract from the letter that the magazine printed was the only writing of Anning's published in the scientific literature during her lifetime. Some personal letters written by Anning, such as her correspondence with Frances Augusta Bell, were published while she was alive, however.

=== Interactions with the scientific community ===
As a woman, Anning was treated as an outsider to the scientific community. At the time in Britain, women were not allowed to vote, hold public office, or attend university. The newly formed, but increasingly influential Geological Society of London did not allow women to become members, or even to attend meetings as guests. The only occupations generally open to working-class women were farm labour, domestic service, and work in the newly opened factories.

Although Anning knew more about fossils and geology than many of the wealthy fossilists to whom she sold, it was always the gentlemen geologists who published the scientific descriptions of the specimens she found, often neglecting to mention Anning's name. She became resentful of this. Anna Pinney, a young woman who sometimes accompanied Anning while she collected, wrote: "She says the world has used her ill ... these men of learning have sucked her brains, and made a great deal of publishing works, of which she furnished the contents, while she derived none of the advantages." Anning herself wrote in a letter: "The world has used me so unkindly, I fear it has made me suspicious of everyone". Hugh Torrens writes that these slights to Anning were part of a larger pattern of ignoring the contributions of working-class people in early 19th-century scientific literature. Often a fossil would be found by a quarryman, construction worker, or road worker who would sell it to a wealthy collector, and it was the latter who was credited if the find was of scientific interest.

Along with purchasing specimens, many geologists visited Anning to collect fossils or discuss anatomy and classification. Henry De la Beche and Anning became friends as teenagers following his move to Lyme, and he, Anning, and sometimes her brother Joseph, went fossil-hunting together. De la Beche and Anning kept in touch as he became one of Britain's leading geologists. William Buckland, who lectured on geology at the University of Oxford, often visited Lyme on his Christmas vacations and was frequently seen hunting for fossils with Anning. It was to him Anning made what would prove to be the scientifically important suggestion (in a letter auctioned for over £100,000 in 2020) that the strange conical objects known as bezoar stones were really the fossilised faeces of ichthyosaurs or plesiosaurs. Buckland would name the objects coprolites. In 1839 Buckland, Conybeare and Richard Owen visited Lyme together so that Anning could lead them all on a fossil-collecting excursion.

Anning also assisted Thomas Hawkins with his efforts to collect ichthyosaur fossils at Lyme in the 1830s. She was aware of his penchant to "enhance" the fossils he collected. Anning wrote: "he is such an enthusiast that he makes things as he imagines they ought to be; and not as they are really found...". A few years later there was a public scandal when it was discovered that Hawkins had inserted fake bones to make some ichthyosaur skeletons seem more complete, and later sold them to the government for the British Museum's collection without the appraisers knowing about the additions.

The Swiss palaeontologist Louis Agassiz visited Lyme Regis in 1834 and worked with Anning to obtain and study fish fossils found in the region. He was so impressed by Anning and her friend Elizabeth Philpot that he wrote in his journal: "Miss Philpot and Mary Anning have been able to show me with utter certainty which are the ichthyodorulite's dorsal fins of sharks that correspond to different types." He thanked both of them for their help in his book, Studies of Fossil Fish.

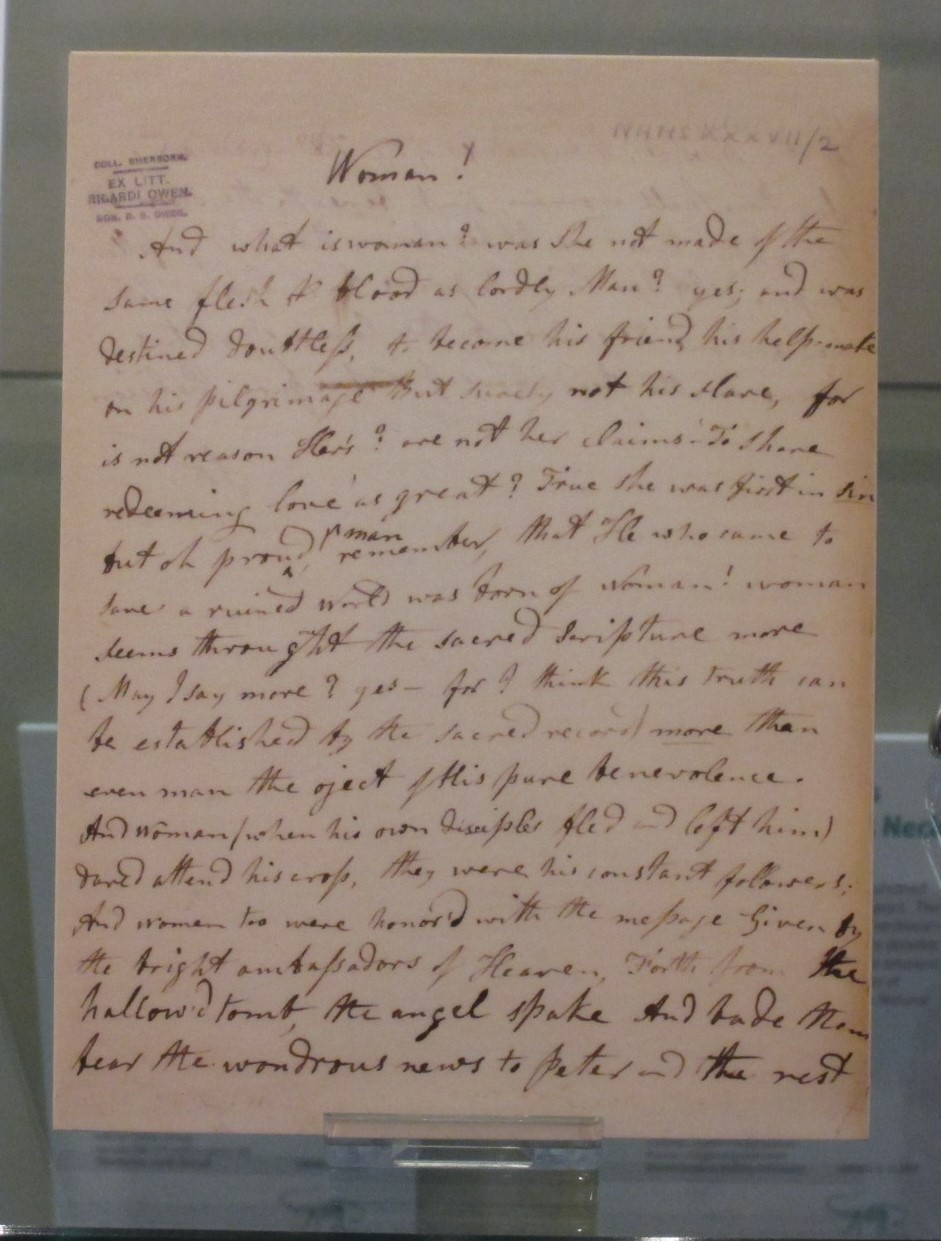
Page from Mary Anning's notebook (facsimile)

Another leading British geologist, Roderick Murchison, did some of his first fieldwork in southwest England, including Lyme, accompanied by his wife, Charlotte. Murchison wrote that they decided Charlotte should stay behind in Lyme for a few weeks to "become a good practical fossilist, by working with the celebrated Mary Anning of that place...". Charlotte and Anning became lifelong friends and correspondents. Charlotte, who travelled widely and met many prominent geologists through her work with her husband, helped Anning build her network of customers throughout Europe, and she stayed with the Murchisons when she visited London in 1829. Anning's correspondents included Charles Lyell, who wrote to ask her opinion on how the sea was affecting the coastal cliffs around Lyme, as well as Adam Sedgwick—one of her earliest customers—who taught geology at the University of Cambridge and who numbered Charles Darwin among his students. Gideon Mantell, discoverer of the dinosaur Iguanodon, also visited Anning at her shop.

=== Financial difficulties and change in church affiliation ===
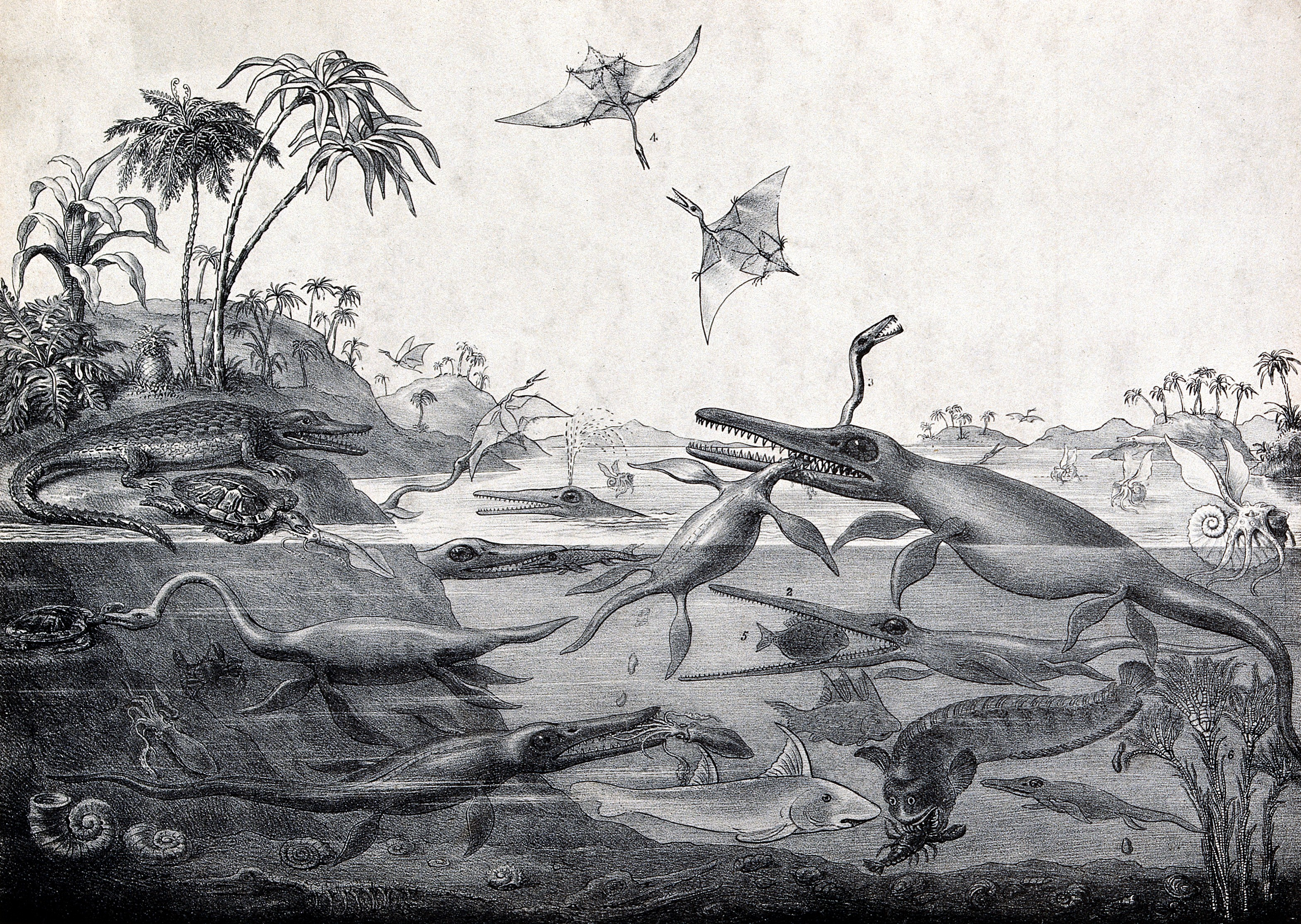
The lithograph print of Duria Antiquior, made by Scharf based on Henry De la Beche's original watercolour

By 1830, because of difficult economic conditions in Britain that reduced the demand for fossils, coupled with long gaps between major finds, Anning was having financial problems again. Her friend, the geologist Henry De la Beche, assisted her by commissioning Georg Scharf to make a lithographic print based on De la Beche's watercolour painting, Duria Antiquior, portraying life in prehistoric Dorset that was based largely on fossils Anning had found. De la Beche sold copies of the print to his fellow geologists and other wealthy friends and donated the proceeds to Anning. It became the first such scene from what later became known as deep time to be widely circulated. In December 1830, Anning finally made another major find, a skeleton of a new type of plesiosaur, which sold for £200.

It was around this time that Anning switched from attending the local Congregational church, where she had been baptised and in which she and her family had always been active members, to the Anglican church. The change was prompted in part by a decline in Congregational attendance that began in 1828 when its popular pastor, John Gleed, a fellow fossil collector, left for the United States to campaign against slavery. He was replaced by the less likeable Ebenezer Smith. The greater social respectability of the established church, in which some of Anning's gentleman geologist customers such as Buckland, Conybeare and Sedgwick were ordained clergy, was also a factor. Anning, who was devoutly religious, actively supported her new church as she had her old.

Anning suffered another serious financial setback in 1835 when she lost most of her life savings, about £300, in a bad investment. Sources differ somewhat on what exactly went wrong. Deborah Cadbury says that she invested with a conman who swindled her and disappeared with the money, but Shelley Emling writes that it is not clear whether the man ran off with the money or whether he died suddenly leaving Anning with no way to recover the investment. Concerned about Anning's financial situation, her old friend William Buckland persuaded the British Association for the Advancement of Science and the British government to award her an annuity, known as a civil list pension, in return for her many contributions to the science of geology. The £25 annual pension gave Anning some financial security.

=== Illness and death ===
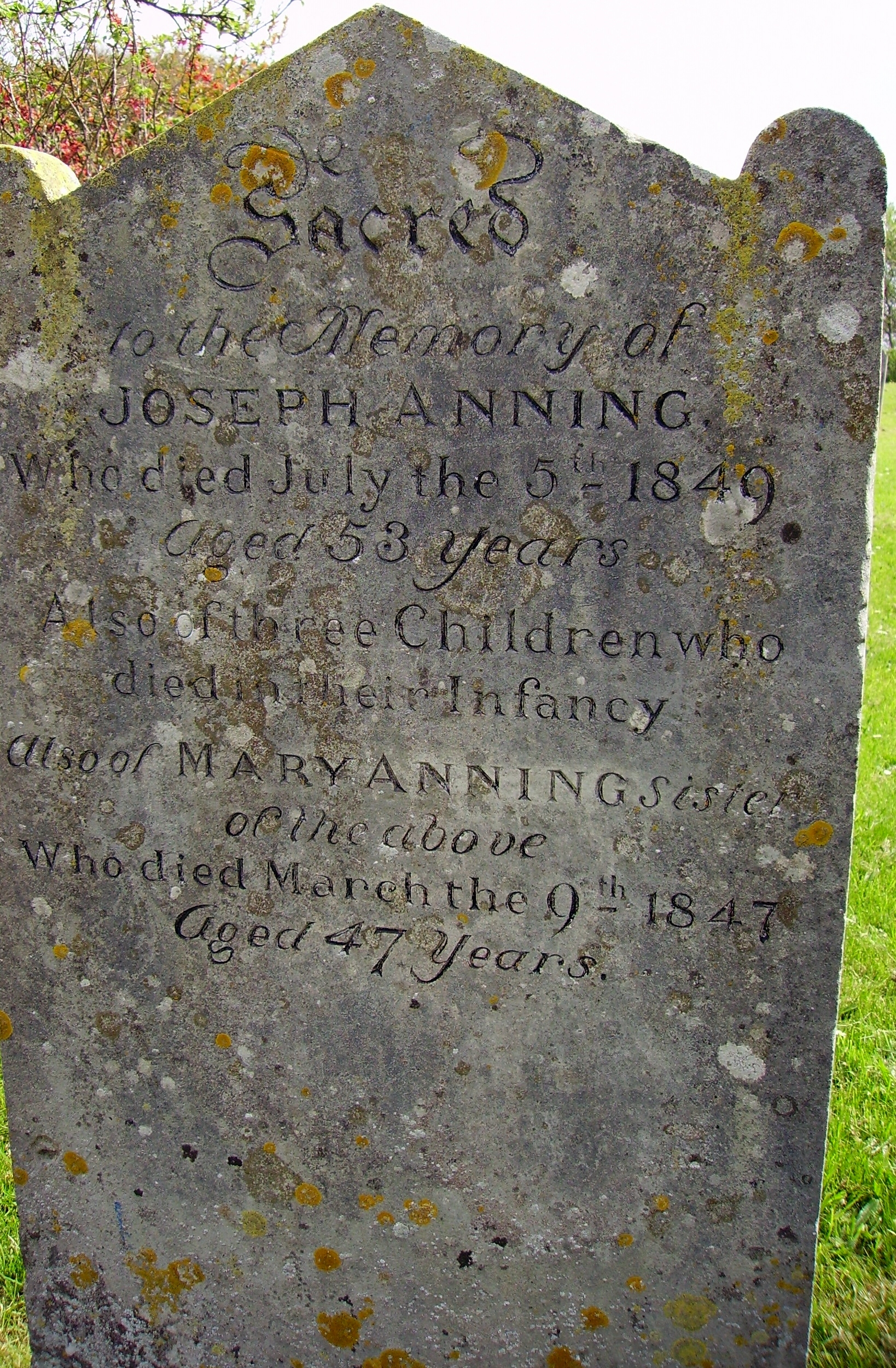
Gravestone of Anning and her brother Joseph in St Michael's churchyard

Anning died from breast cancer at the age of 47 on 9 March 1847. Her fossil work had tailed off during the last few years of her life because of her illness, and as some townspeople misinterpreted the effects of the increasing doses of laudanum she was taking for the pain, there had been gossip in Lyme that she had a drinking problem. The regard in which Anning was held by the geological community was shown in 1846 when, upon learning of her cancer diagnosis, the Geological Society raised money from its members to help with her expenses and the council of the newly created Dorset County Museum made Anning an honorary member. She was buried on 15 March in the churchyard of St Michael's, the local parish church. Members of the Geological Society contributed to a stained-glass window in Anning's memory, unveiled in 1850. It depicts the six corporal acts of mercy—feeding the hungry, giving drink to the thirsty, clothing the naked, sheltering the homeless, visiting prisoners and the sick, and the inscription reads: "This window is sacred to the memory of Mary Anning of this parish, who died 9 March AD 1847 and is erected by the vicar and some members of the Geological Society of London in commemoration of her usefulness in furthering the science of geology, as also of her benevolence of heart and integrity of life."

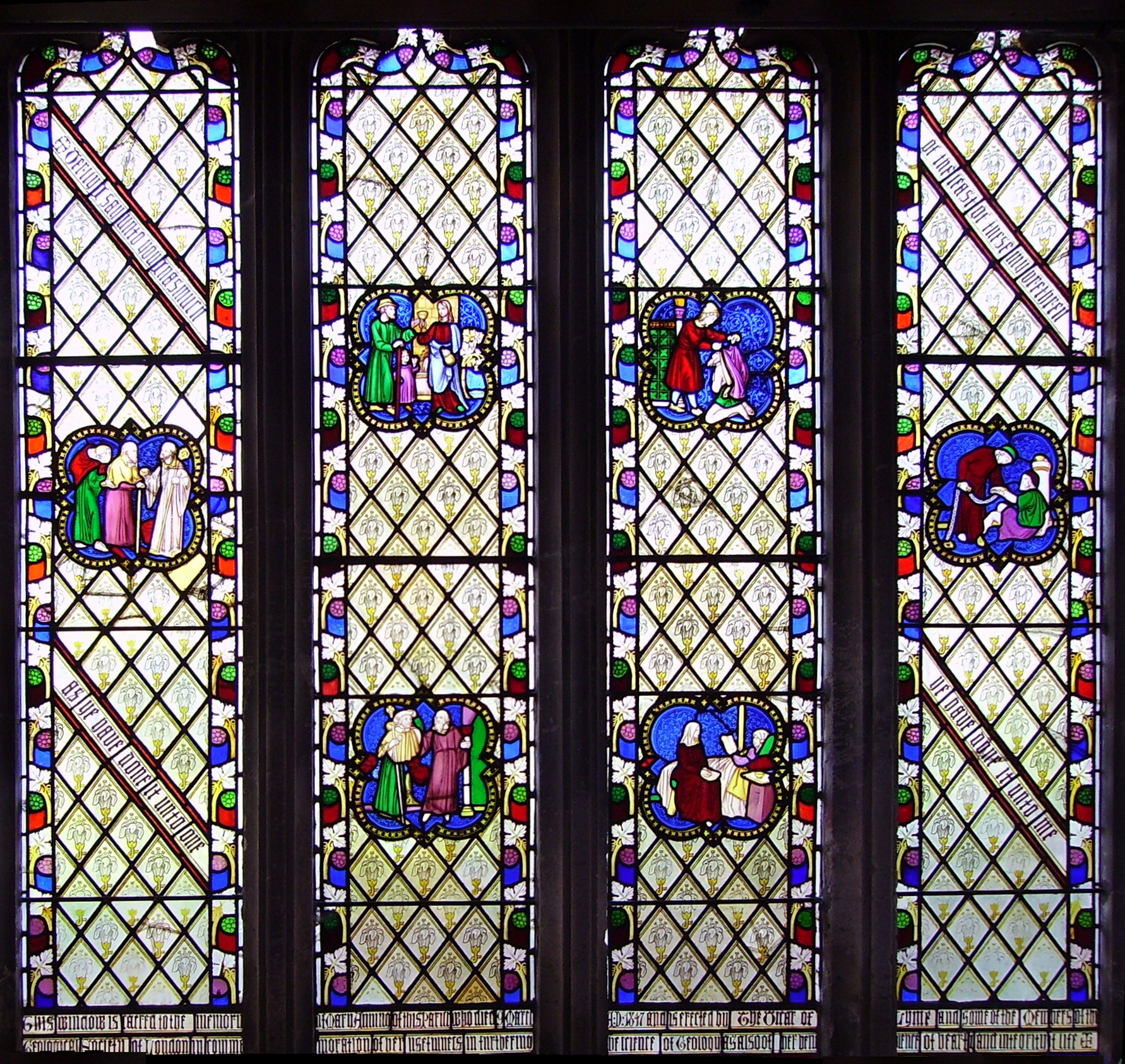
Mary Anning's Window, St Michael's Church

After Anning's death, Henry De la Beche, president of the Geological Society, wrote a eulogy that he read to a meeting of the society and published in its quarterly transactions, the first such eulogy given for a woman. These were honours normally only accorded to fellows of the society, which did not admit women until 1904. The eulogy began:

I cannot close this notice of our losses by death without adverting to that of one, who though not placed among even the easier classes of society, but one who had to earn her daily bread by her labour, yet contributed by her talents and untiring researches in no small degree to our knowledge of the great Enalio-Saurians, and other forms of organic life entombed in the vicinity of Lyme Regis ...

An anonymous article about Anning's life was published in February 1865 in Charles Dickens's literary magazine All the Year Round. The profile, "Mary Anning, The Fossil Finder", was long attributed to Dickens himself but, in 2014, historians of palaeontology Michael A. Taylor and Hugh Torrens identified Henry Stuart Fagan as the author, noting that Fagan's work was "neither original nor reliable" and "introduced errors into the Anning literature which are still problematic". Specifically, they noted that Fagan had largely and inaccurately plagiarised his article from an earlier account of Anning's life and work by Dorset native Henry Rowland Brown, from the second edition of Brown's 1859 guidebook, The Beauties of Lyme Regis. The article emphasised the difficulties Anning had overcome, especially the scepticism of her fellow townspeople. Fagan ended the article with: "The carpenter's daughter has won a name for herself, and has deserved to win it."

== Major discoveries ==
=== Ichthyosaurs ===
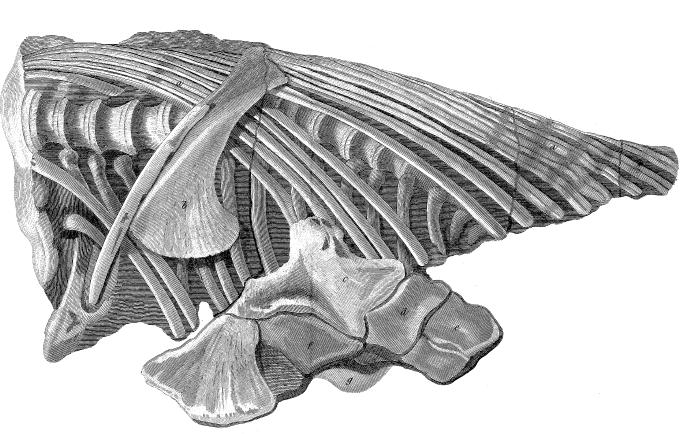
Drawing from Everard Home's 1814 paper of part of the skeletal remains of Temnodontosaurus platyodon (part of specimen NHMUK PV R1158), the first ichthyosaur found by Anning

Anning's first famous discovery was made shortly after her father's death when she was still a child of about 12. In 1811 (some sources say 1810 or 1809) her brother Joseph found a 4 ft (1.2 m) skull, but failed to locate the rest of the animal. After Joseph told Anning to look between the cliffs at Lyme Regis and Charmouth, she found the skeleton—17 ft (5.2 m) long in all—a few months later. The family hired workmen to dig it out in November that year, an event covered by the local press on 9 November, who identified the fossil as a crocodile.

Other ichthyosaur remains had been discovered in years past at Lyme and elsewhere, but the specimen found by the Annings was the first to come to the attention of scientific circles in London. It was purchased by the lord of a local manor, who passed it to William Bullock for public display in London where it created a sensation. At a time when most people in Britain still believed in a literal interpretation of Genesis, that the Earth was only a few thousand years old and that species did not evolve or become extinct, the find raised questions in scientific and religious circles about what the new science of geology was revealing about ancient life and the history of the Earth. Its notoriety increased when Sir Everard Home wrote a series of six papers, starting in 1814, describing it for the Royal Society. The papers never mentioned who had collected the fossil, and in the first one he even mistakenly credited the painstaking cleaning and preparation of the fossil performed by Anning to the staff at Bullock's museum. Perplexed by the creature, Home kept changing his mind about its classification, first thinking it was a kind of fish, then thinking it might have some kind of affinity with the duck-billed platypus (only recently known to science); finally in 1819 he reasoned it might be a kind of intermediate form between salamanders and lizards, which led him to propose naming it Proteo-Saurus. By then Charles Konig, an assistant curator of the British Museum, had already suggested the name Ichthyosaurus (fish lizard) for the specimen and that name stuck. Konig purchased the skeleton for the museum in 1819. The skull of the specimen is still in the possession of the Natural History Museum in London (to which the fossil collections of the British Museum were transferred later in the century), but at some point, it became separated from the rest of the skeleton, the location of which is not known.

Anning found several other ichthyosaur fossils between 1815 and 1819, including almost complete skeletons of varying sizes. In 1821, William Conybeare and Henry De la Beche, both members of the Geological Society of London, collaborated on a paper that analysed in detail the specimens found by Anning and others. They concluded that ichthyosaurs were a previously unknown type of marine reptile, and based on differences in tooth structure, they concluded that there had been at least three species. Also in 1821, Anning found the 20 ft (6.1 m) skeleton from which the species Ichthyosaurus platydon (now Temnodontosaurus platyodon) would be named. In the 1980s it was determined that the first ichthyosaur specimen found by Joseph and Mary Anning was also a member of Temnodontosaurus platyodon.

In 2022, two plaster casts of the first complete ichthyosaur skeleton fossil found by Anning that was destroyed in the bombing of London during the Second World War, were discovered in separate collections. One is at the Peabody Museum of Natural History at Yale University in the US and the other at the Natural History Museum in Berlin, Germany. The casts may be secondary, being made from a direct cast of the fossil, but are determined to be of good condition, "historically important", and likely taken from the specimen put for sale at auction by Anning in 1820.

=== Plesiosaurus ===
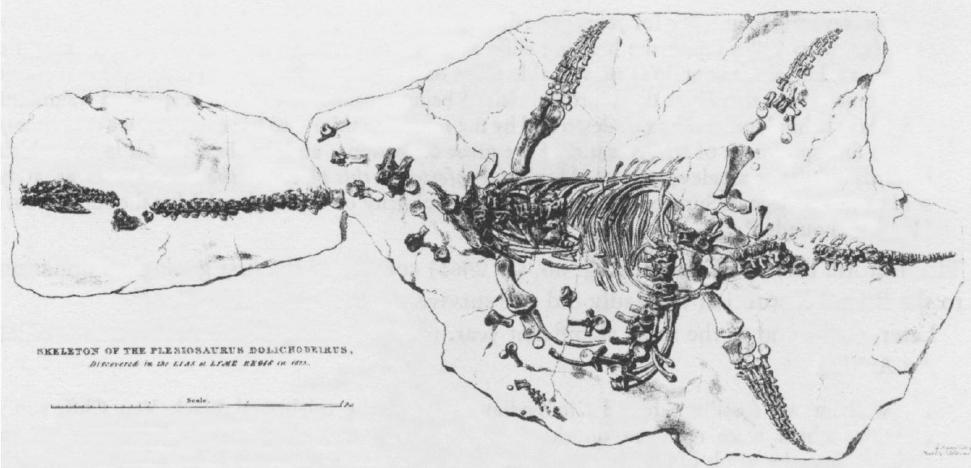
Drawing published in the Transactions of the Geological Society of the nearly complete skeleton of Plesiosaurus dolichodeirus (NHMUK OR 22656) found by Anning in 1823.

In the same 1821 paper he co-authored with Henry De la Beche on ichthyosaur anatomy, William Conybeare named and described the genus Plesiosaurus (near lizard), called so because he thought it more like modern reptiles than the ichthyosaur had been. The description was based on a number of fossils, the most complete of them specimen OUMNH J.50146, a paddle and vertebral column that had been obtained by Lieutenant-Colonel Thomas James Birch. Christopher McGowan has hypothesised that this specimen had originally been much more complete and had been collected by Anning, during the winter of 1820/1821. If so, it would have been Anning's next major discovery, providing essential information about the newly recognised type of marine reptile. No records by Anning of the find are known. The paper thanked Birch for giving Conybeare access to it, but does not mention who discovered and prepared it.

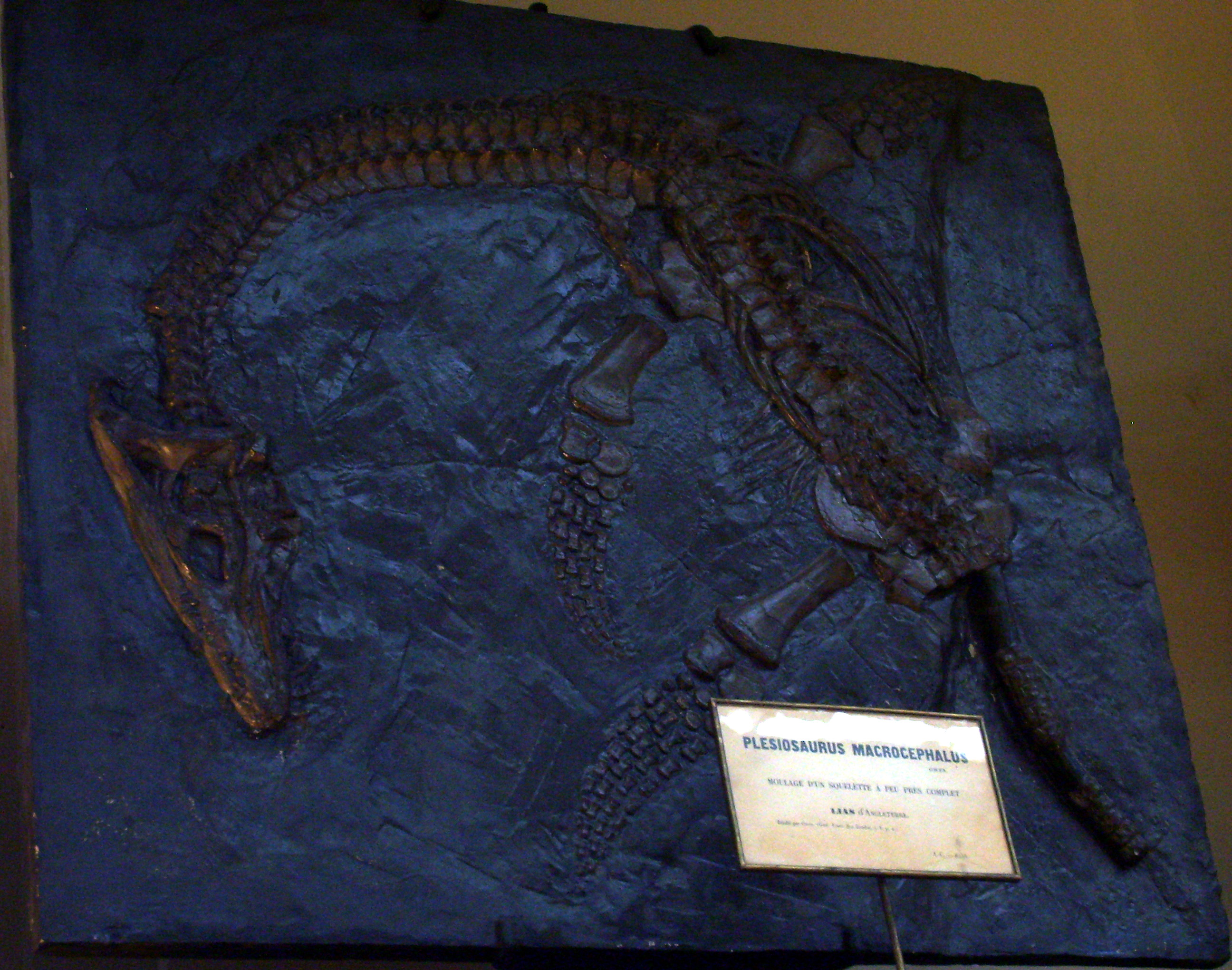
Cast of Plesiosaurus macrocephalus found by Mary Anning in 1830

In 1823, Anning discovered a second, much more complete plesiosaur skeleton, specimen NHMUK OR 22656 (formerly BMNH 22656). When Conybeare presented his analysis of plesiosaur anatomy to a meeting of the Geological Society in 1824, he again failed to mention Anning by name, even though she had possibly collected both skeletons and had made the sketch of the second skeleton he used in his presentation. Conybeare's presentation was made at the same meeting at which William Buckland described the dinosaur Megalosaurus and the combination created a sensation in scientific circles.

Conybeare's presentation followed the resolution of a controversy over the legitimacy of one of the fossils. The fact that the plesiosaur's long neck had an unprecedented 35 vertebrae raised the suspicions of the eminent French anatomist Georges Cuvier when he reviewed Anning's drawings of the second skeleton, and he wrote to Conybeare suggesting the possibility that the find was a fake produced by combining fossil bones from different kinds of animals. Fraud was far from unknown among early 19th-century fossil collectors, and if the controversy had not been resolved promptly, the accusation could have seriously damaged Anning's ability to sell fossils to other geologists. Cuvier's accusation had resulted in a special meeting of the Geological Society earlier in 1824, which, after some debate, had concluded the skeleton was legitimate. Cuvier later admitted he had acted in haste and was mistaken.

Anning discovered yet another important and nearly complete plesiosaur skeleton in 1830. It was named Plesiosaurus macrocephalus by William Buckland and was described in an 1840 paper by Richard Owen. Once again Owen mentioned the wealthy gentleman who had purchased the fossil and made it available for examination, but not the woman who had discovered and prepared it.

=== Fossil fish and pterosaur ===
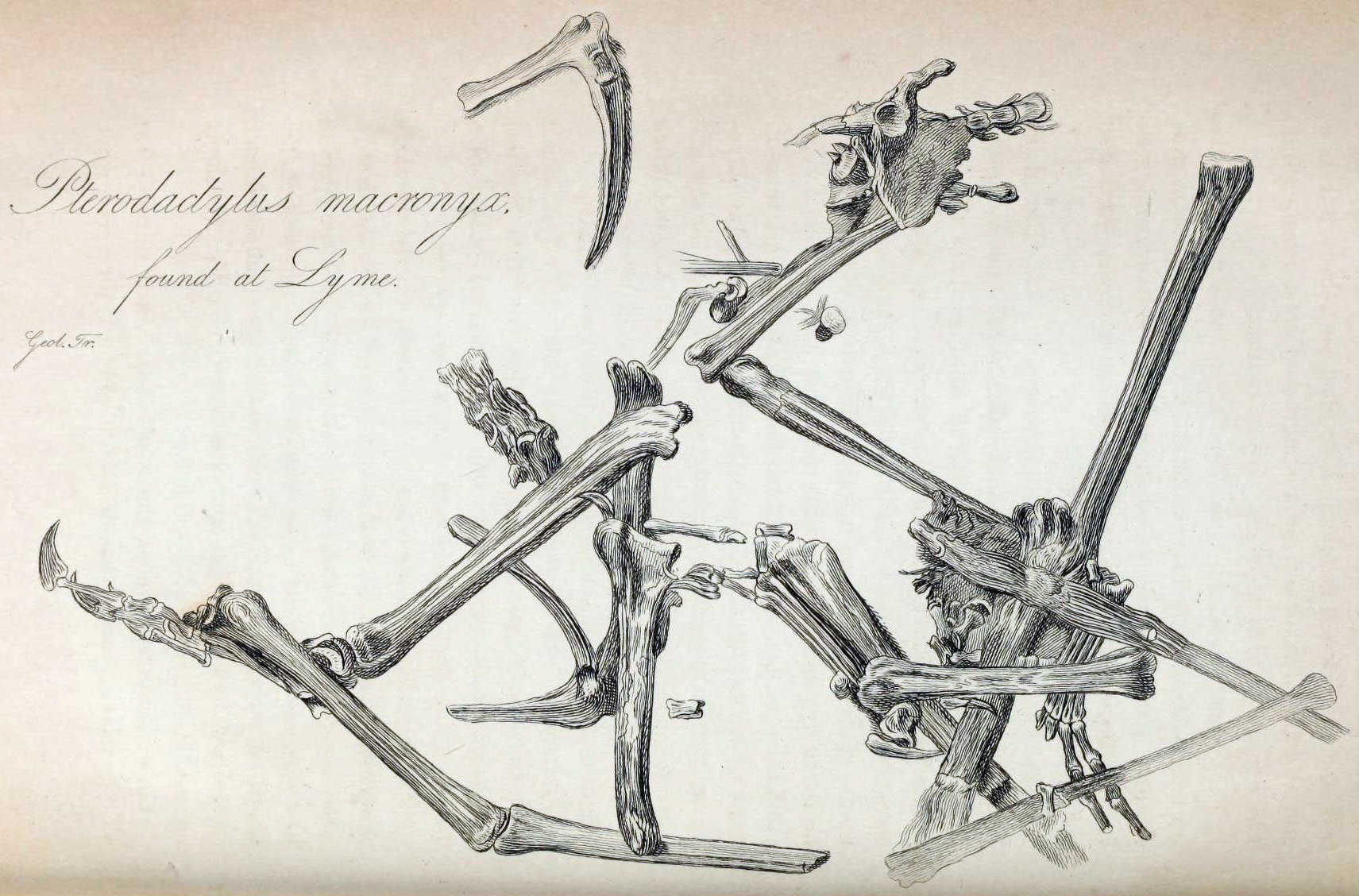
The holotype specimen of Dimorphodon macronyx (NHMUK PV R 1034) found by Mary Anning in 1828

Anning found what a contemporary newspaper article called an unrivalled specimen of Dapedium politum. This was a ray-finned fish, which would be described in 1828. In December of that same year she made an important find consisting of the partial skeleton of a pterosaur. In 1829 William Buckland described it as Pterodactylus macronyx (later renamed Dimorphodon macronyx by Richard Owen), and unlike many other such occasions, Buckland credited Anning with the discovery in his paper. It was the first pterosaur skeleton found outside Germany, and it created a public sensation when displayed at the British Museum. Recent research has found that these creatures were not inclined to fly continuously in their search for fish.

In December 1829 she found a fossil fish, Squaloraja, which attracted attention because it had characteristics intermediate between sharks and rays.

=== Invertebrates and trace fossils ===
Vertebrate fossil finds, especially of marine reptiles, made Anning's reputation, but she made numerous other contributions to early palaeontology. In 1826 Anning discovered what appeared to be a chamber containing dried ink inside a belemnite fossil. She showed it to her friend Elizabeth Philpot who was able to revivify the ink and use it to illustrate some of her own ichthyosaur fossils. Soon other local artists were doing the same, as more such fossilised ink chambers were discovered. Anning noted how closely the fossilised chambers resembled the ink sacs of modern squid and cuttlefish, which she had dissected to understand the anatomy of fossil cephalopods, and this led William Buckland to publish the conclusion that Jurassic belemnites had used ink for defence just as many modern cephalopods do. It was also Anning who noticed that the oddly shaped fossils then known as "bezoar stones" were sometimes found in the abdominal region of ichthyosaur skeletons. She noted that if such stones were broken open they often contained fossilised fish bones and scales, and sometimes bones from small ichthyosaurs. Anning suspected the stones were fossilised faeces and suggested so to Buckland in 1824. After further investigation and comparison with similar fossils found in other places, Buckland published that conclusion in 1829 and named them coprolites. In contrast to the finding of the plesiosaur skeletons a few years earlier, for which she was not credited, when Buckland presented his findings on coprolites to the Geological Society, he mentioned Anning by name and praised her skill and industry in helping to solve the mystery.

== Recognition and legacy ==
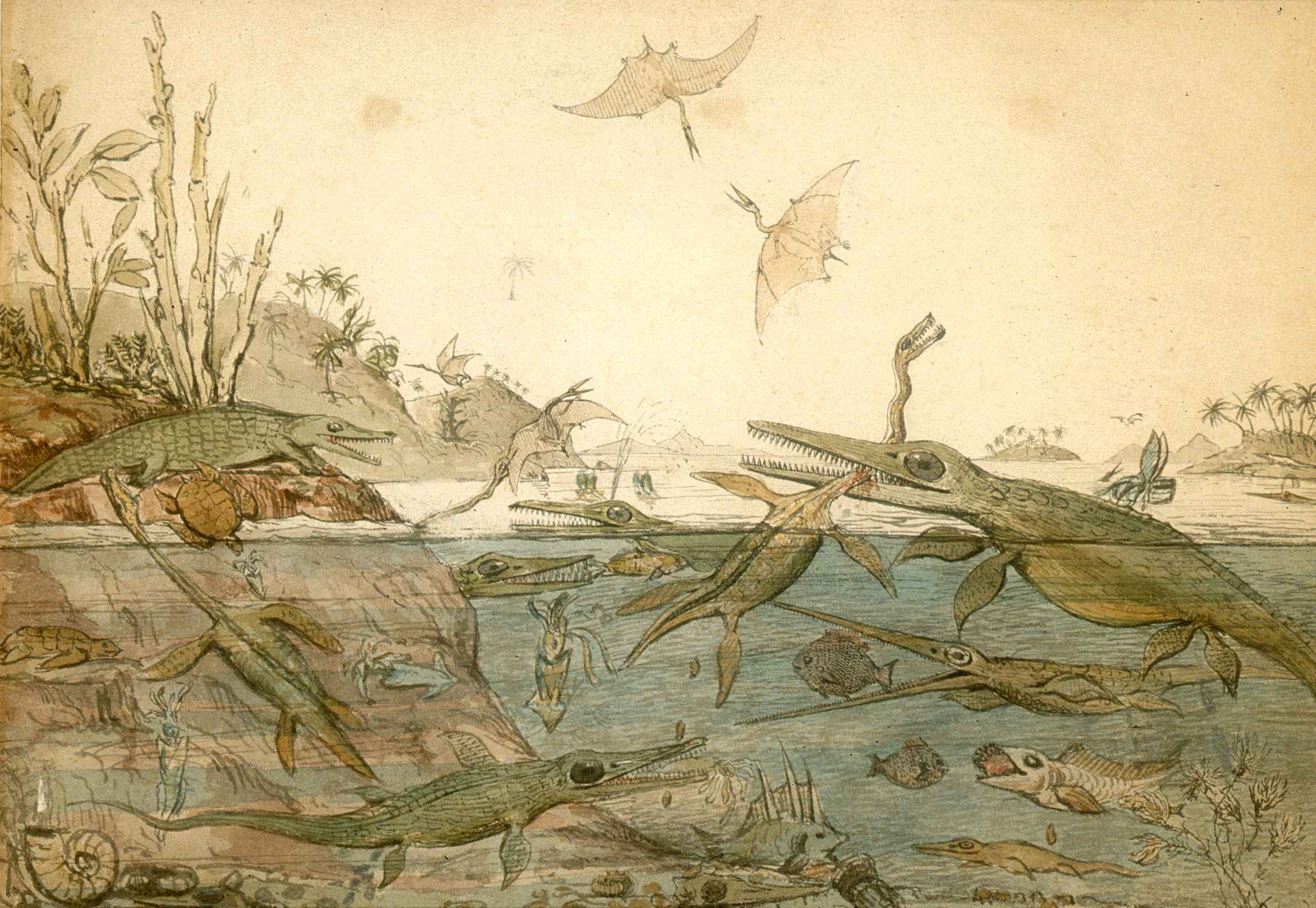
The geologist Henry De la Beche painted the influential watercolour Duria Antiquior in 1830, based largely on fossils found by Anning.

Anning's discoveries became key pieces of evidence for extinction. Georges Cuvier had argued for the reality of extinction in the late 1790s based on his analysis of fossils of mammals such as mammoths. Nevertheless, until the early 1820s it was still believed by many scientifically literate people that just as new species did not appear, so existing ones did not become extinct—in part because they felt that extinction would imply that God's creation had been imperfect; any oddities found were explained away as belonging to animals still living somewhere in an unexplored region of the Earth. The bizarre nature of the fossils found by Anning—some, such as the plesiosaur, so unlike any known living creature—struck a major blow against this idea.

The ichthyosaurs, plesiosaurs, and pterosaur she found, along with the first dinosaur fossils, which were discovered by Gideon Mantell and William Buckland during the same period, showed that during previous eras the Earth was inhabited by creatures different from those living today, and provided important support for another controversial suggestion of Cuvier's: that there had been an "age of reptiles" in which they rather than mammals had been the dominant form of animal life. This phrase became popular after the publication in 1831 of Mantell's paper "The Age of Reptiles", which summarised the evidence that there had been an extended geological era in which giant reptiles had swarmed the land, air and sea. These discoveries also played a key role in the development of a new discipline of geohistorical analysis within geology in the 1820s that sought to understand the history of the Earth by using evidence from fossils to reconstruct extinct organisms and the environments in which they lived. This discipline eventually came to be called palaeontology. Illustrations of scenes from "deep time" (now known as palaeoart), such as Henry De la Beche's painting Duria Antiquior, helped convince people that it was possible to understand life in the distant past. De la Beche had been inspired to create the painting by a vivid description of the food chain of the Lias by William Buckland that was based on analysis of coprolites. The study of coprolites, pioneered by Anning and Buckland, would prove to be a valuable tool for understanding ancient ecosystems.

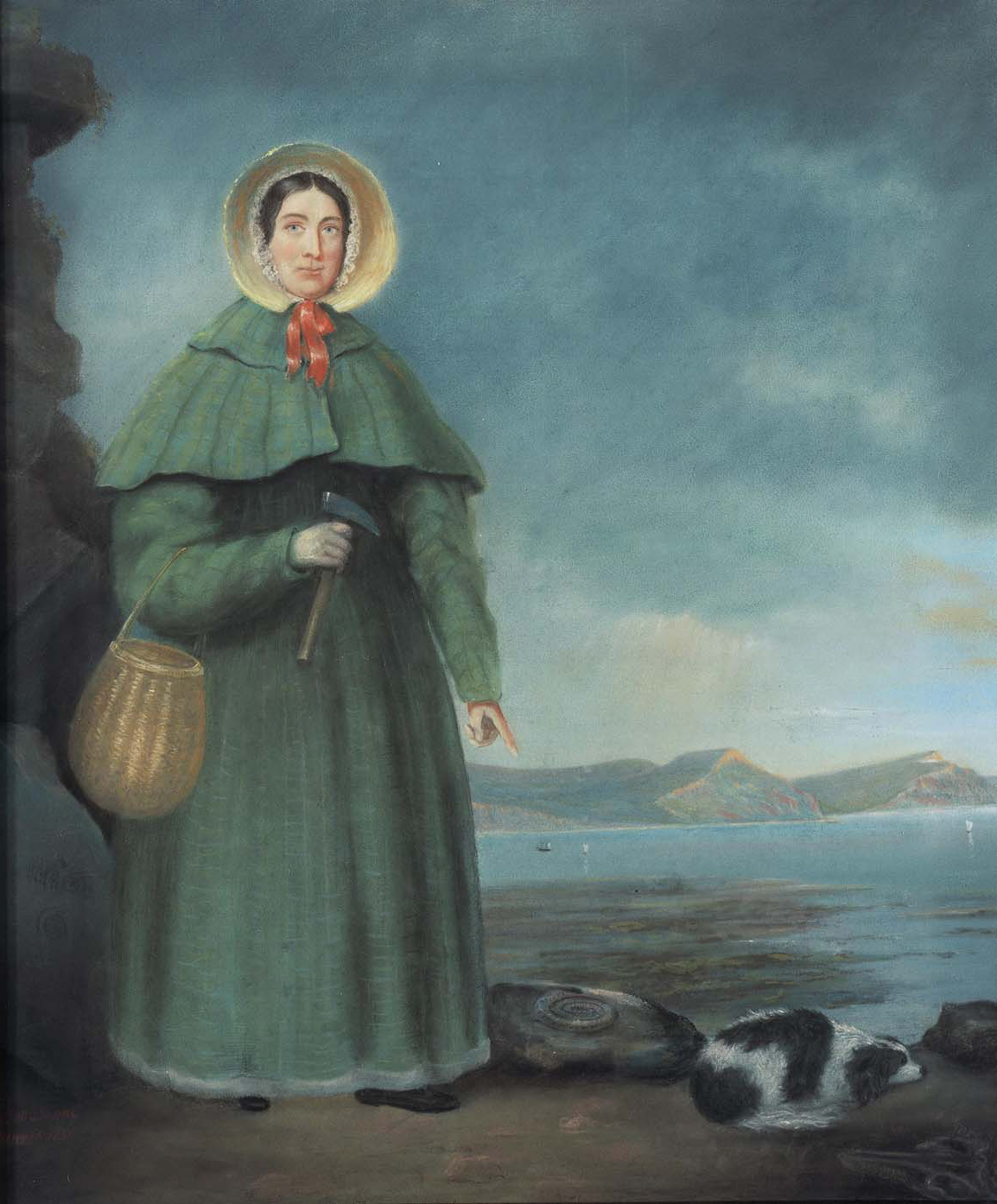
Posthumous painting of Anning by B. J. Donne from 1847, based on the 1842 portrait at the head of this article, showing her pointing at an ammonite

Throughout the 20th century, beginning with H. A. Forde and his The Heroine of Lyme Regis: The Story of Mary Anning the Celebrated Geologist (1925), a number of writers saw Anning's life as inspirational. According to P. J. McCartney in Henry De la Beche: Observations on an Observer (1978), she was the basis of Terry Sullivan's lyrics to the 1908 song which, McCartney claimed, became the popular tongue twister, "She Sells Seashells":

She sells seashells on the seashore
The shells she sells are seashells, I'm sure
So if she sells seashells on the seashore
Then I'm sure she sells seashore shells.

However, Stephen Winick of the American Folklife Center has shown that no evidence has been presented for any causal connection between Anning and the lyrics (which are about a music-hall performer who has difficulty with tongue-twisters); in particular, Winick consulted McCartney's original text and discovered that not only did McCartney not provide any sources to support his statement, he merely said that Anning was "reputed to be" the subject of the song. Winick also pointed out that the tongue-twister pre-dated Sullivan by decades, and stated that there is a "very imperfect fit between the details of the song and those of Mary Anning's life", and "not even a real female character in the song, let alone anyone recognizable as Mary Anning", ultimately concluding that if the song was intended as a tribute to Anning, it is "a pretty ineffective one."

Much of the material written about Anning was aimed at children, and tended to focus on her childhood and early career. Much of it was also highly romanticised and not always historically accurate. Anning has been referenced in several historical novels, most notably in The French Lieutenant's Woman (1969) by John Fowles, who was critical of the fact that no British scientist had named a species after her in her lifetime.

In 1999, on the 200th anniversary of Anning's birth, an international meeting of historians, palaeontologists, fossil collectors and others interested in her life was held in Lyme Regis. In 2005 the Natural History Museum added Anning, alongside scientists such as Carl Linnaeus, Dorothea Bate and William Smith, as one of the "gallery characters" (actors dressed in period costumes) it uses to walk around its display cases. In 2007, American playwright/performer Claudia Stevens premiered Blue Lias, or the Fish Lizard's Whore, a solo play with music by Allen Shearer depicting Anning in later life. Among the presenters of its thirty performances around the Charles Darwin bicentennial were the Cleveland Museum of Natural History, museums of natural history at the University of Michigan and the University of Kansas, and the Sam Noble Oklahoma Museum of Natural History.

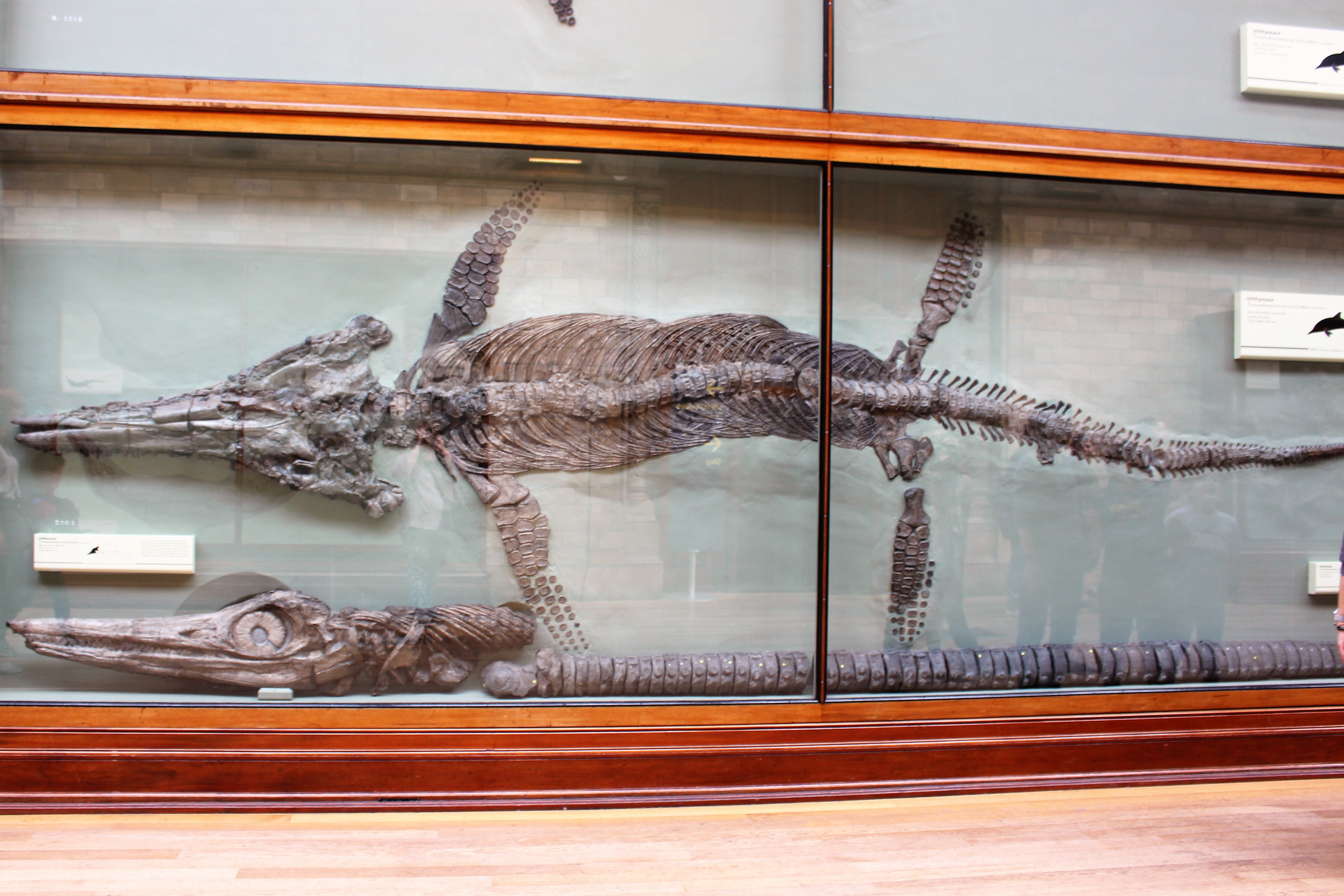
Various fossil specimens of Temnodontosaurus platyodon associated with Mary Anning on display at the Natural History Museum in London. These include the first specimen discovered, NHMUK PV R 1158 (bottom left), and the neotype skeleton, NHMUK PV R 2003 (centre).

In 2009, Tracy Chevalier wrote a historical novel entitled Remarkable Creatures, in which Anning and Elizabeth Philpot were the main characters. Another historical novel about Anning, Curiosity by Joan Thomas, was published in March 2010.

In 2010, 163 years after her death, the Royal Society included Anning in a list of the ten British women who have most influenced the history of science.

In 1902, the Lyme Regis Museum was built on the site of her former home. It was commissioned by Thomas Philpot, a relative of the Philpot sisters. The area where she collected fossils is now part of the Jurassic Coast World Heritage Site.

In 2021, the Royal Mint issued sets of commemorative fifty pence coins called The Mary Anning Collection, designed by the palaeoartist Bob Nicholls and minted in acknowledgement of her lack of recognition as "one of Britain's greatest fossil hunters". The coins have images of Temnodontosaurus, Plesiosaurus and Dimorphodon, which she discovered, and her discoveries were "often overlooked at a time when the scientific world was dominated by men", and as "a working-class woman".

In March 2024, the Royal Mail issued a set of four stamps celebrating Mary Anning and her discoveries.

In May 2024, a book that once belonged to Anning was returned to the museum in Lyme Regis from Australia on her 225th birthday. It is thought that the copy of J. S. Miller's Natural History of the Crinoidea was stolen between 1946 and 1979, before Museums Victoria bought the book for £300 from Blackwell's booksellers of Oxford in 1985.

=== Eponyms ===
Selfie taken by the Curiosity Mars rover at the location named Mary Anning, 12 November 2020

The only person who named a species after Anning during her lifetime was the Swiss-American naturalist, Louis Agassiz. In the early 1840s he named two fossil fish species after Anning—Acrodus anningiae and "Belonostomus" anningiae (now Saurorhynchus anningae)—and another after her friend Elizabeth Philpot. Agassiz was grateful for the help the women had given him in examining fossil fish specimens during his visit to Lyme Regis in 1834. After Anning's death, other species, including the ostracod Cytherelloidea anningi, and two genera, the therapsid reptile genus Anningia, and the bivalve mollusc genus Anningella, were named in her honour. In 2012, the plesiosaur genus Anningasaura was named after Anning and the species Ichthyosaurus anningae was named after her in 2015. In 2025 the fossil coelacanth Whiteia anniae was named in honour of both Anning and Anni Dai, a Chinese fan of Anning whose family contributed to the collection of Whiteia anniae fossils.

In 1991 Anning Paterae, a cluster of shallow volcanoes in the northern hemisphere of Venus and in 1999, (3919) Maryanning, an asteroid were named after her. A location on Mars investigated by the Curiosity rover was named Mary Anning. It was analysed by drilling for samples in October 2020 and in April 2026 it was announced that one of the drill holes, Mary Anning 3, had produced the most diverse collection of organic molecules ever found on Mars. Seven of the 21 carbon-containing molecules identified in the sample were detected for the first time on the planet.

In 2018, a new research and survey vessel was launched as Mary Anning for Swansea University.

=== Statue ===
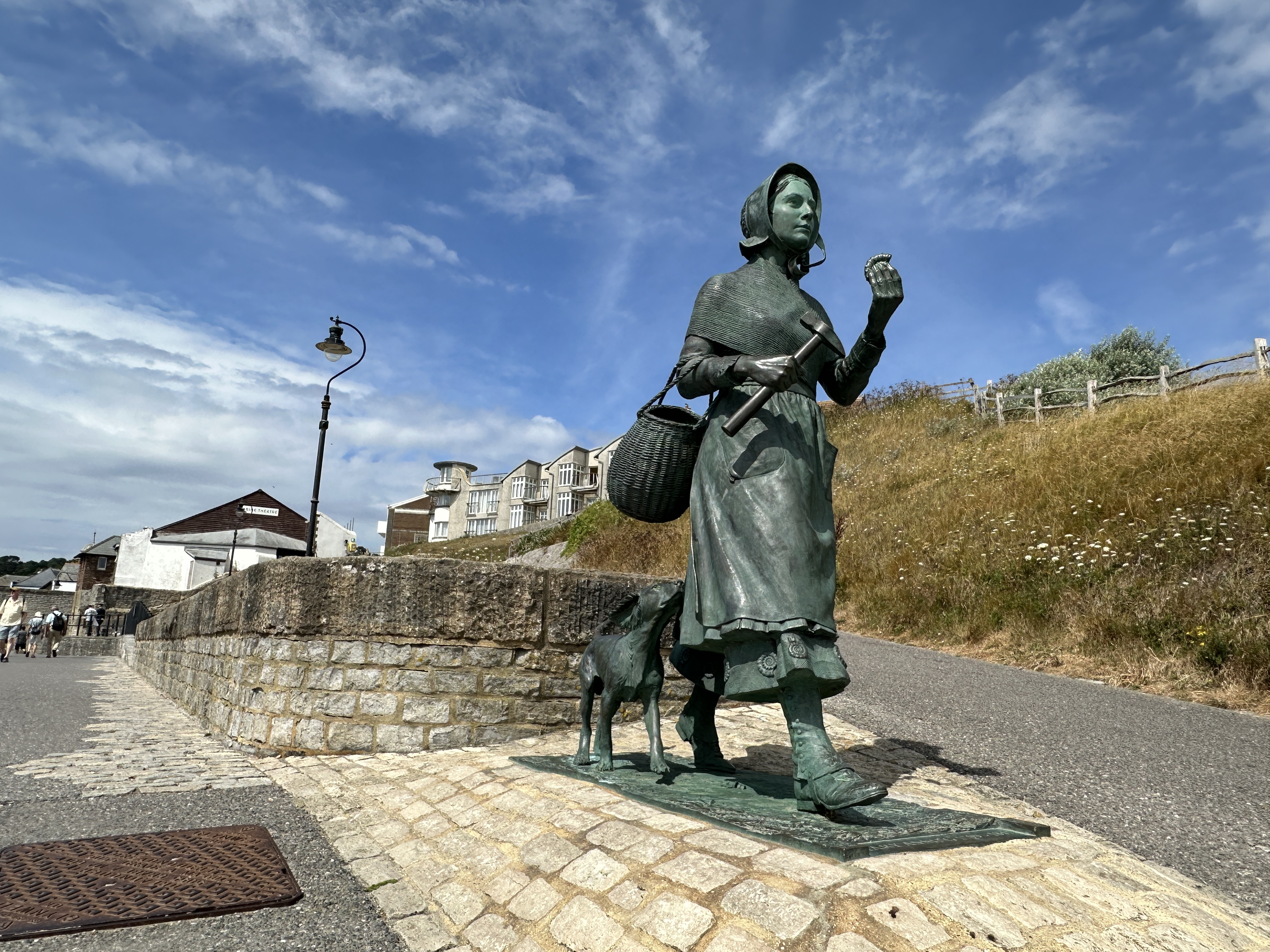
The statue of Anning in Lyme Regis

In August 2018, a campaign called "Mary Anning Rocks" was formed by an 11-year-old schoolgirl from Dorset, Evie Swire, supported by her mother Anya Pearson. The campaign was set up to remember Anning in her hometown of Lyme Regis by erecting a statue and creating a learning legacy in her name. A crowdfunding campaign began but was put on hold due to the COVID-19 pandemic in the United Kingdom; it resumed in November 2020. By January 2021, the sculptor Denise Dutton had been commissioned to produce the work. The statue was granted planning permission by Dorset Council for a space overlooking Black Ven, where Anning made many of her finds. Professor Alice Roberts and Swire unveiled the statue on 21 May 2022, the 223rd anniversary of Anning's birth.

=== In the arts ===
Mary Anning appears in the web manga Learn Even More with Manga!, derived from the 2015 video game Fate/Grand Order. Her depiction in that manga brings several features from Anning's life into play, such as fossil-collecting gear, fossils, and live versions of ichthyosaurs and plesiosaurs. In 2022, Anning was added to the video game Fate/Grand Order as a gacha character for a limited time.

The 2020 film Ammonite, directed by Francis Lee, and based on segments of Anning's life and legacy, premiered at the 2020 Toronto International Film Festival. Kate Winslet portrays Anning and Saoirse Ronan portrays Charlotte Murchison, with the two engaged in an imagined lesbian relationship.

== See also ==
- Geology of Dorset
- Timeline of women in science
- Women in geology

== Sources ==
- Anonymous (1828), Another discovery by Mary Anning of Lyme. An unrivalled specimen of Dapedium politum an antediluvian fish, vol. 108:5599, Salisbury and Winchester Journal, p. 2
- Berkeley, Edmund; Berkeley, Dorothy Smith (1988), George William Featherstonhaugh: The First U.S. Government Geologist, University of Alabama Press
- Brice, William (2001), Hugh S. Torrens, History of Geology Division Award, Citation, Geological Society of America, archived from the original on 20 July 2011
- Cadbury, Deborah (2000), The Dinosaur Hunters: A True Story of Scientific Rivalry and the Discovery of the Prehistoric World, Fourth Estate, ISBN 978-1-85702-963-5
- Carus, C.G. (1846), The King of Saxony's journey through England and Scotland in the year 1844, Chapman and Hall
- Conybeare, William (1824), "On the Discovery of an almost perfect Skeleton of the Plesiosaurus", Transactions of the Geological Society of London, S2-1 (2), Geological Society of London: 381–389, doi:10.1144/transgslb.1.2.381, S2CID 129024288
- De la Beche, Henry; Conybeare, William (1821), Notice of the discovery of a new Fossil Animal, forming a link between the Ichthyosaurus and Crocodile, together – with general remarks on the Osteology of the Ichthyosaurus, Geological Society of London
- Dean, Dennis R. (1999), Gideon Mantell and the Discovery of Dinosaurs, Cambridge University Press, p. 310, Bibcode:1999gmdd.book.....D, ISBN 978-0-521-42048-8
- Dickens, Charles (1865), Mary Anning, the Fossil Finder, vol. 13, All Year Round
- Emling, Shelley (2009), The Fossil Hunter: Dinosaurs, Evolution, and the Woman whose Discoveries Changed the World, Palgrave Macmillan, ISBN 978-0-230-61156-6
- Goodhue, Thomas W. (2002), Curious Bones: Mary Anning and the Birth of Paleontology (Great Scientists), Morgan Reynolds, ISBN 978-1-883846-93-0
- Goodhue, Thomas W. (2004), Fossil Hunter: The Life and Times of Mary Anning (1799–1847), Academica Press LLC, ISBN 978-1-930901-55-1
- Gordon, Elizabeth Oak (1894), The life and correspondence of William Buckland, D.D., F.R.S, John Murray
- Grant, Johnson (1825), A Memoir of Miss Frances Augusta Bell, Hatchard & Son
- Home, Everard (1814), "Some Account of the Fossil Remains of an Animal More Nearly Allied to Fishes Than Any of the Other Classes of Animals", Philosophical Transactions of the Royal Society of London, 104: 571–577, doi:10.1098/rstl.1814.0029, S2CID 111132066
- Home, Everard (1819), "Reasons for Giving the Name Proteo-Saurus to the Fossil Skeleton Which Has Been Described", Philosophical Transactions of the Royal Society of London, 109: 212–216, doi:10.1098/rstl.1819.0016
- Howe, S. R.; Sharpe, T.; Torrens, H. S. (1981), Ichthyosaurs: a history of fossil 'sea-dragons', National Museum Wales, ISBN 978-0-7200-0232-4
- McGowan, Christopher (2001), The Dragon Seekers, Persus Publishing, ISBN 978-0-7382-0282-2
- Rudwick, Martin J.S. (1992), Scenes from Deep Time: Early Pictorial Representations of the Prehistoric World, The University of Chicago Press, ISBN 978-0-226-73105-6
- Rudwick, Martin J.S. (2008), Worlds Before Adam: The Reconstruction of Geohistory in the Age of Reform, The University of Chicago Press, ISBN 978-0-226-73128-5
- Sharpe, T.; McCartney, Paul J. (1998), The Papers of H.T. De la Beche (1796–1855) in the National Museum of Wales, National Museum Wales, ISBN 978-0-7200-0454-0
- Torrens, Hugh (1995), "Mary Anning (1799–1847) of Lyme; 'The Greatest Fossilist the World Ever Knew'", The British Journal for the History of Science, 25 (3): 257–284, doi:10.1017/S0007087400033161, JSTOR 4027645
- Torrens, Hugh (2008). "Anning, Mary (1799–1847)". Oxford Dictionary of National Biography Online Edition. Oxford Dictionary of National Biography (online ed.). Oxford University Press. doi:10.1093/ref:odnb/568. (Subscription, Wikipedia Library access or UK public library membership required.)
