= Elizabeth Philpot =

British palaeontologist

- Born: 1780
- Died: 1857 (aged 76–77)

Elizabeth Philpot (1779–1857) was an early 19th-century British fossil collector, amateur palaeontologist and artist who collected fossils from the cliffs around Lyme Regis in Dorset on the southern coast of England. She is best known today for her collaboration and friendship with the well known fossil hunter Mary Anning. She was well known in geological circles for her knowledge of fossil fish as well as her extensive collection of specimens and was consulted by leading geologists and palaeontologists of the time including William Buckland, and Louis Agassiz. When Mary Anning discovered that belemnite fossils contained ink sacs, it was Philpot who discovered that the fossilised ink could be revivified with water and used for illustrations, which became a common practice for local artists.

== Life and friendship with Anning ==
Born on 5 July 1779, Elizabeth Philpot and her sisters Mary and Margaret moved to Lyme from London in 1805. They shared a house purchased for them by their brother, a London lawyer. They lived in Lyme for the rest of their lives. The Philpots became well known locally for their fossil collecting, as well as for a home made medication, a soothing salve, that they made and distributed. Elizabeth Philpot befriended Mary Anning when Anning was still a child; despite the almost 20-year age difference and the fact that the working class Anning was from a much poorer background, the two became close and were frequently seen collecting fossils together. Philpot encouraged the young Anning to read about geology and understand the science behind the fossils she collected and sold.

== Fossils ==
The Philpot sisters' extensive and meticulously labelled fossil collection was used for research by many geologists. All three sisters contributed to the collection, but it was Elizabeth Philpot who corresponded with leading geologists like William Buckland, William Conybeare, and Henry De la Beche about the collection. The collection was well known for its fossil fish. It also contained the fossil teeth that William Buckland combined with a famous partial skeleton discovered by Mary Anning when he described the pterosaur Pterodactylus macronyx (later renamed by Richard Owen to Dimorphodon macronyx), in 1829. In his famous 1824 paper that described the almost complete plesiosaur skeleton discovered by Anning in 1823 Conybeare mentioned examining a plesiosaur skull in the possession of "Miss Philpot".

In 1834 Buckland arranged for the Swiss palaeontologist Louis Agassiz to visit Lyme to work with Elizabeth Philpot and Anning to obtain and study fish fossils found in the region. They were able to show him fossils of 34 different species, and he was so impressed by the knowledge of Philpot and Anning that he wrote in his journal: "Miss Philpot and Mary Anning have been able to show me with utter certainty which are the ichthyodorulites dorsal fins of sharks that correspond to different types." He thanked both women for their help in his monumental book, Studies of Fossil Fish, and he named a fossil fish species, Eugnathus philpotae (now Furo philpotae), after Philpot and another two species after Anning.

== Fossil ink ==
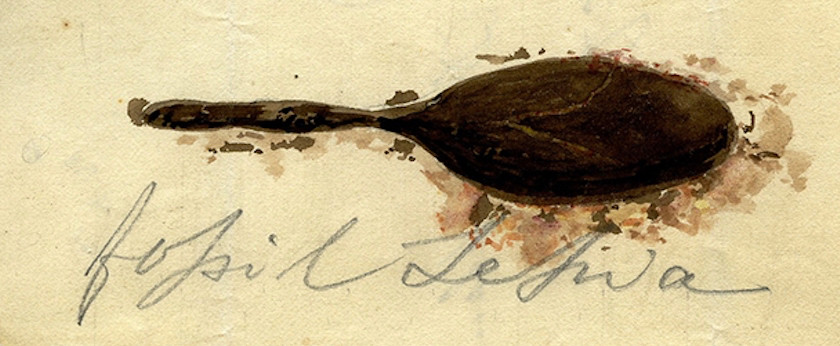
A fossil Sepia ink sac drawn with fossil sepia in 1834 by Philpot. The pencil annotation, "fossil sepia", is by William Buckland.

In 1826 Mary Anning discovered what appeared to be a chamber containing dried ink inside a belemnite fossil. She showed it to her friend Elizabeth Philpot. Philpot was able to revivify the ink by mixing it with water and used it to illustrate some of her own ichthyosaur fossils, and other local artists were soon doing the same as more such fossilised ink chambers were discovered.

== Legacy ==
The Philpot sisters' important fossil collection ended up at the Oxford University Museum of Natural History. The Lyme Regis Philpot Museum was built in Lyme Regis in honour of the sisters by their nephew Thomas Philpot. In 2009 Tracy Chevalier wrote a historical novel entitled Remarkable Creatures about Elizabeth Philpot and Mary Anning, and in March 2010 an Australian production company acquired the rights to produce a feature film from the book. Elizabeth is portrayed by actress Fiona Shaw in the romantic drama film Ammonite (2020).
