= Duria Antiquior =

1830 painting by Henry De la Beche

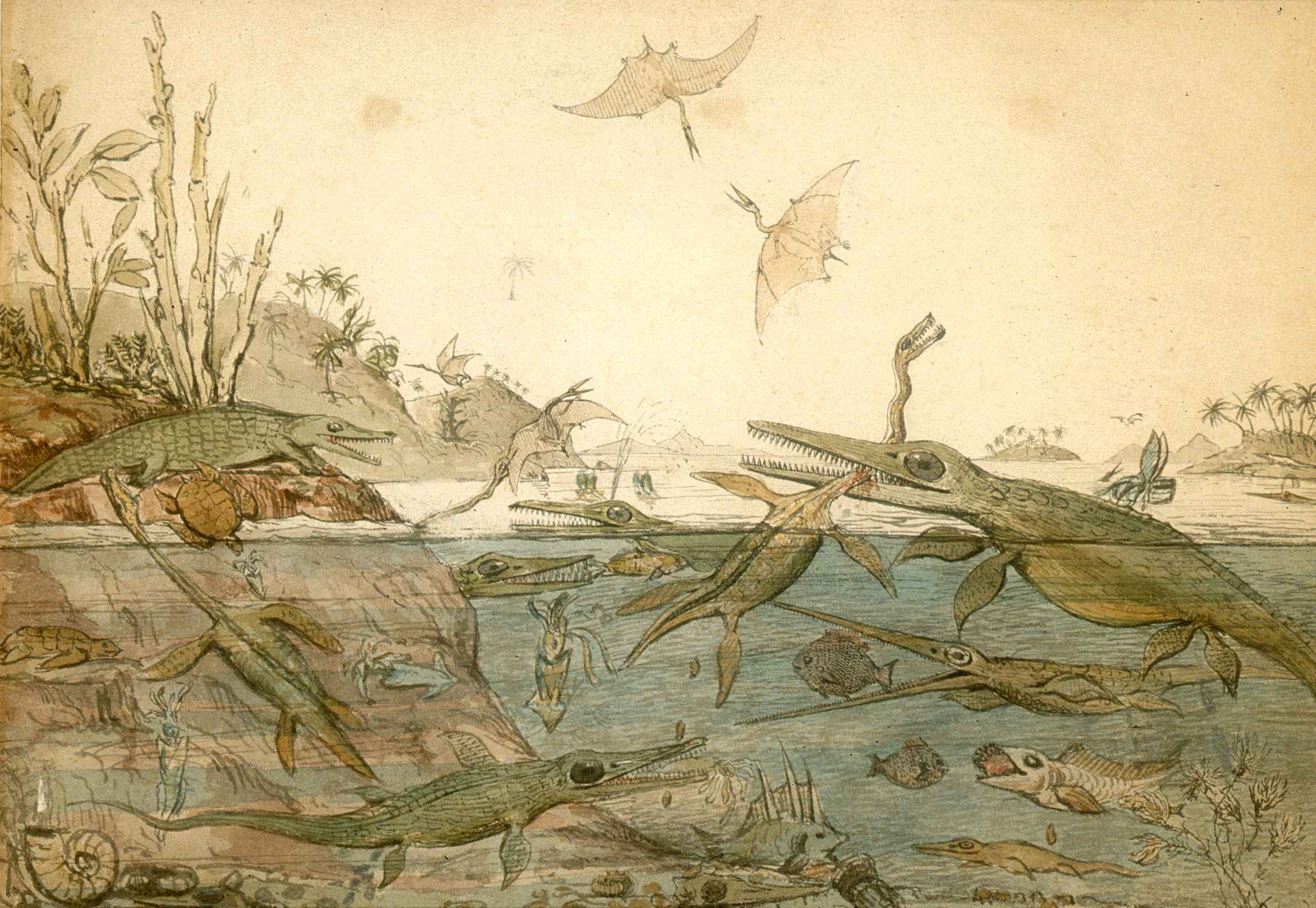
Duria Antiquior – A more Ancient Dorset is a watercolour painted in 1830 by the geologist Henry De la Beche based on fossils found by Mary Anning, and was the first pictorial representation of a scene from deep time based on fossil evidence.

Duria Antiquior, a more ancient Dorset is the first pictorial representation of a scene of prehistoric life based on evidence from fossil reconstructions, a genre now known as paleoart.

The first version was a watercolour painted in 1830 by the English geologist Henry De la Beche based on fossils found in Lyme Regis, Dorset, mostly by the professional fossil collector Mary Anning. This is now in the National Museum Cardiff. De la Beche had the professional artist Georg Scharf produce lithographic prints based on the painting, which he sold to friends to raise money for Anning's benefit.

It was the first depiction of a scene from deep time to see even limited publication. The print was used for educational purposes and widely circulated in scientific circles; it influenced several other such depictions that began to appear in scientific and popular literature. Several later versions were produced.

== Origins ==
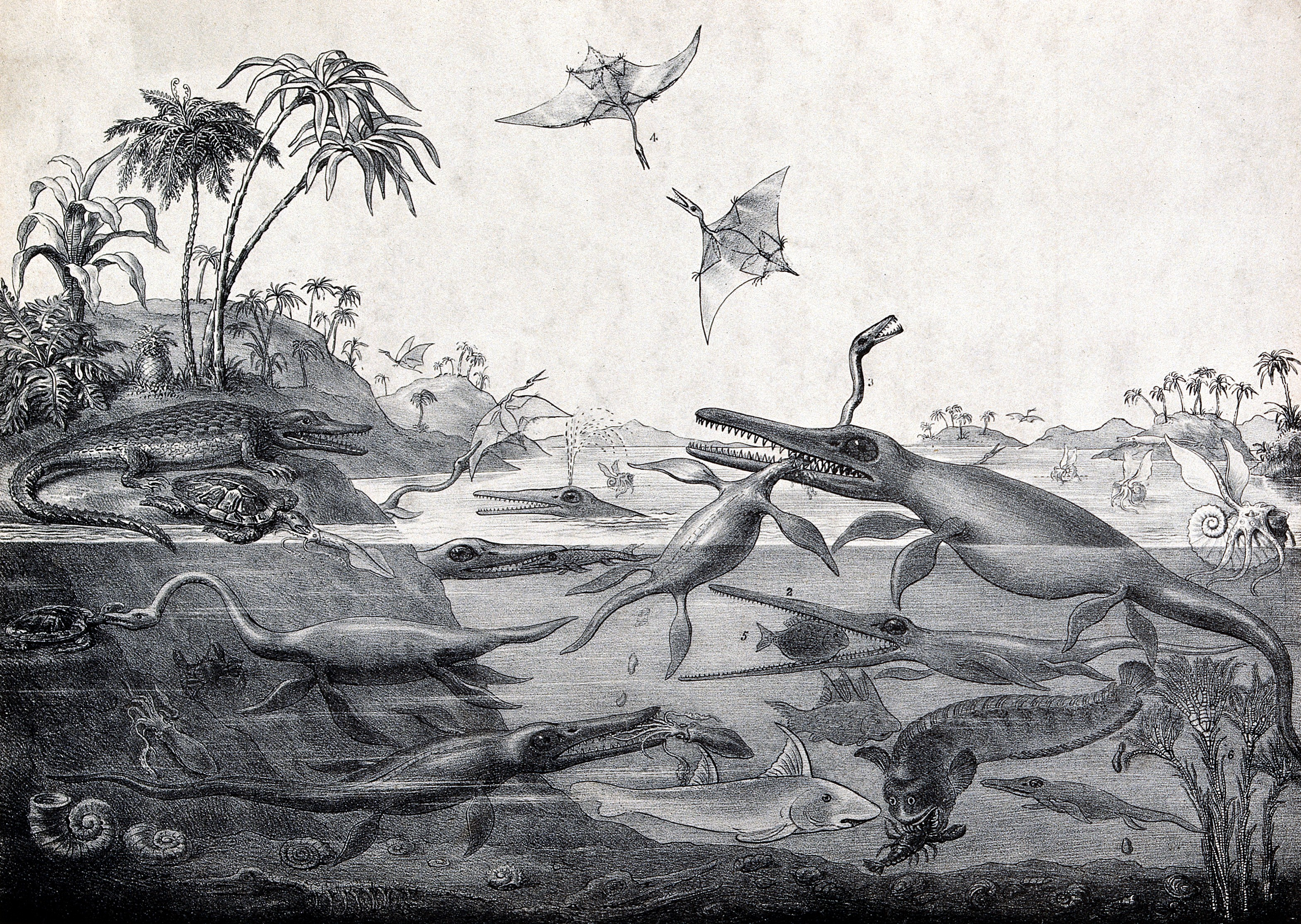
The lithographic print made by Georg Scharf based on De la Beche's original watercolour.

By 1830 Mary Anning was well known to the leading British geologists and fossil collectors for her ability to spot important fossils in the Jurassic limestone and shale formations around the resort town of Lyme Regis on the Dorset coast, and for her knowledge and skill in collecting, preparing, and reconstructing them. William Conybeare’s scientific description of some of the marine reptile fossils she had found, including the first ichthyosaur skeleton to be recognized for what it was and the first two plesiosaur skeletons ever found, had created a sensation in scientific circles. William Buckland credited Anning with two key observations about certain odd fossils, that they were sometimes found in the abdominal regions of ichthyosaur skeletons, and that they often contained fossilized fish scales and bones (and sometimes the bones of small ichthyosaurs), which led him to conclude that coprolites were fossilized faeces. This discovery led Buckland to write a vivid description of the Lias' food chain. It was this description that motivated the geologist Henry De la Beche, who had worked with Conybeare describing the marine reptile fossils, to create a pictorial representation of life in ancient Dorset.

Despite her renown in geological circles, Anning experienced financial difficulties due to hard economic times in 1830, and the long and unpredictable intervals between major fossil finds. Impressed by the positive reaction from his friends to his initial watercolour painting, De la Beche decided to assist Anning by having the professional illustrator Georg Scharf, who had earlier done lithographs of Conybeare's sketches of plesiosaur and ichthyosaur skeletons, create a lithographic print based on his original. He then sold copies of the print to friends and colleagues at the price of £2 10s each and donated the proceeds to Anning.

Prior to Duria Antiquior Georges Cuvier had published drawings of what he believed certain prehistoric creatures would have looked like in life. Conybeare had drawn a famous cartoon of Buckland sticking his head into a den of prehistoric hyaenas in honour of his well-known analysis of the excavation at Kirkdale Cave, but Duria Antiquior was the first depiction of a scene from deep time showing a variety of prehistoric creatures interacting with one another and their environment based on fossil evidence.

== Composition ==
Many of the creatures are depicted in violent interaction, the emphasis of which was typical in the Regency era. De la Beche translated Conybeare's verbal description of marine reptiles into pictorial form. The central figures are of a large ichthyosaur biting into the long neck of a plesiosaur. Another plesiosaur is seen trying to ambush a crocodile on the shore, and yet another is using its long neck to seize a pterosaur flying above the water. Several of the ichthyosaurs are depicted seizing various fish whose scales and bones had been found in coprolites and a couple are shown excreting the faeces that would eventually fossilize into coprolites. In addition to the vertebrates there were several invertebrates shown including belemnites depicted as squid-like, along with an ammonite represented as a floating creature along the lines of a paper nautilus, accompanied by more recognizable empty ammonite shells on the sea bottom. Stalked crinoids (sea lilies), of which some very finely preserved fossils had been found at Lyme Regis, are depicted in the lower right corner. One of the features of the painting that has most struck historians is the split level view that shows action above and below the surface of the water. This is known as an aquarium view, and Duria Antiquior is the first known example; the style would not become common until the Victorian aquarium craze a couple of decades later.

== Circulation, use and influence ==
Organic Remains Restored, an 1833 print inspired by Duria Antiquior

The prints proved quite popular, and at some point the lithograph was redrawn and a larger run printed; in some of the later versions the figures were numbered. William Buckland kept a supply of the prints on hand and circulated them at his geology lectures. Copies were soon sent to geologists outside Britain, including Cuvier in France. In Berlin, Leopold von Buch, presented the lithograph on 4 February 1831 to an audience, praised the then recent developments in British Geology and raised new questions about the processes of geohistorical change.

A print also apparently reached Georg August Goldfuss, as in 1831 he included a similar drawing, clearly influenced by De la Beche's work, of a scene out of the Jurassic based on fossils from the Jura Mountains in the latest chapter of the serial publication of his Fossils of Germany. Buckland wrote to De la Beche urging him to create more scenes before the Germans used up all the best ideas. De la Beche didn't produce any other scenes on such a scale, but he did include several much smaller and simpler scenes of prehistoric life in the second edition of his Geological Manual (1832). Such scenes didn't remain confined to scientific circles. In 1833 the geologist John Phillips produced Organic Remains Restored, a woodcut of an elaborate prehistoric scene that was obviously influenced by Duria Antiquior and Goldfuss's Jurassic scene, which was published in the popular Penny Magazine. Another illustration which borrowed elements from Duria Antiquior appeared in a French illustrated dictionary of natural history in 1834. Such scenes from deep time vividly illustrated advances in palaeontology, and helped convince scholars and even the general public that the deep past could be understood with a reasonable degree of confidence.

De la Beche's depiction of the vulnerability of long-necked creatures was vindicated when two Triassic species of Tanystropheus (morphologically similar to plesiosaurs) were found to have been attacked about their necks and decapitated.

== Later versions ==
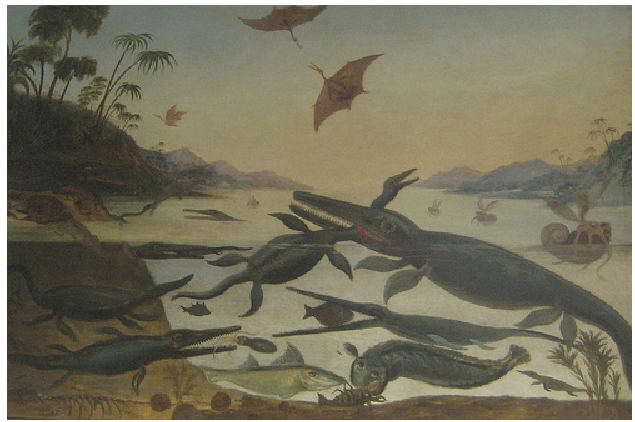
The large oil on canvas painted by Robert Farren circa 1850 based on earlier versions by De la Beche and Scharf.

The Swiss professor of geology Francois Jules Pictet de la Rive had a small version of Duria Antiquior redrawn for inclusion in the last volume of his Elementary Treatise on Paleontology (1844–1846). It was an accurate copy of the De la Beche–Scharf lithograph except that it omitted the faeces. This was the first version of the image to be published in a book. Sometime around 1850 Robert Farren painted a large version of the scene in oil on canvas for Adam Sedgwick. Sedgwick may have used it as a prop in his geology lectures at Cambridge. In 2007 the Lyme Regis artist Richard Bizley worked with David Ward to produce an updated version of the scene that reflected modern scientific knowledge of the creatures depicted. In Lyme Regis Museum there is a large three-dimensional diorama based on Duria Antiquior, created by artist Darrell Wakelam in partnership with local children.

== See also ==
- History of geology
- History of palaeontology
