= Lyme Regis Museum =

Museum in Dorset, England

Lyme Regis Philpot Museum
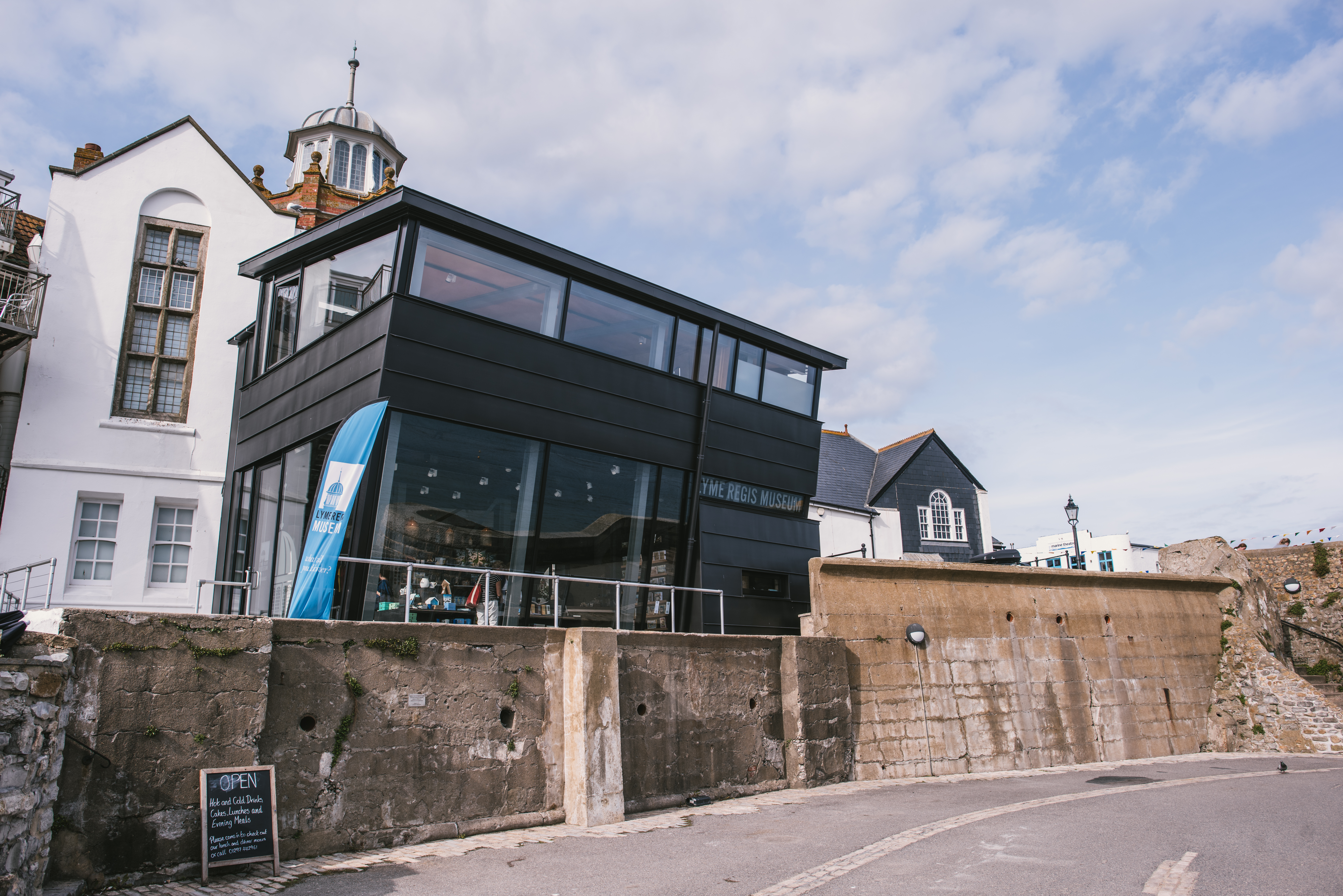
- Coordinates: 50.72481°N 2.93247°W
- Website: www.lymeregismuseum.co.uk

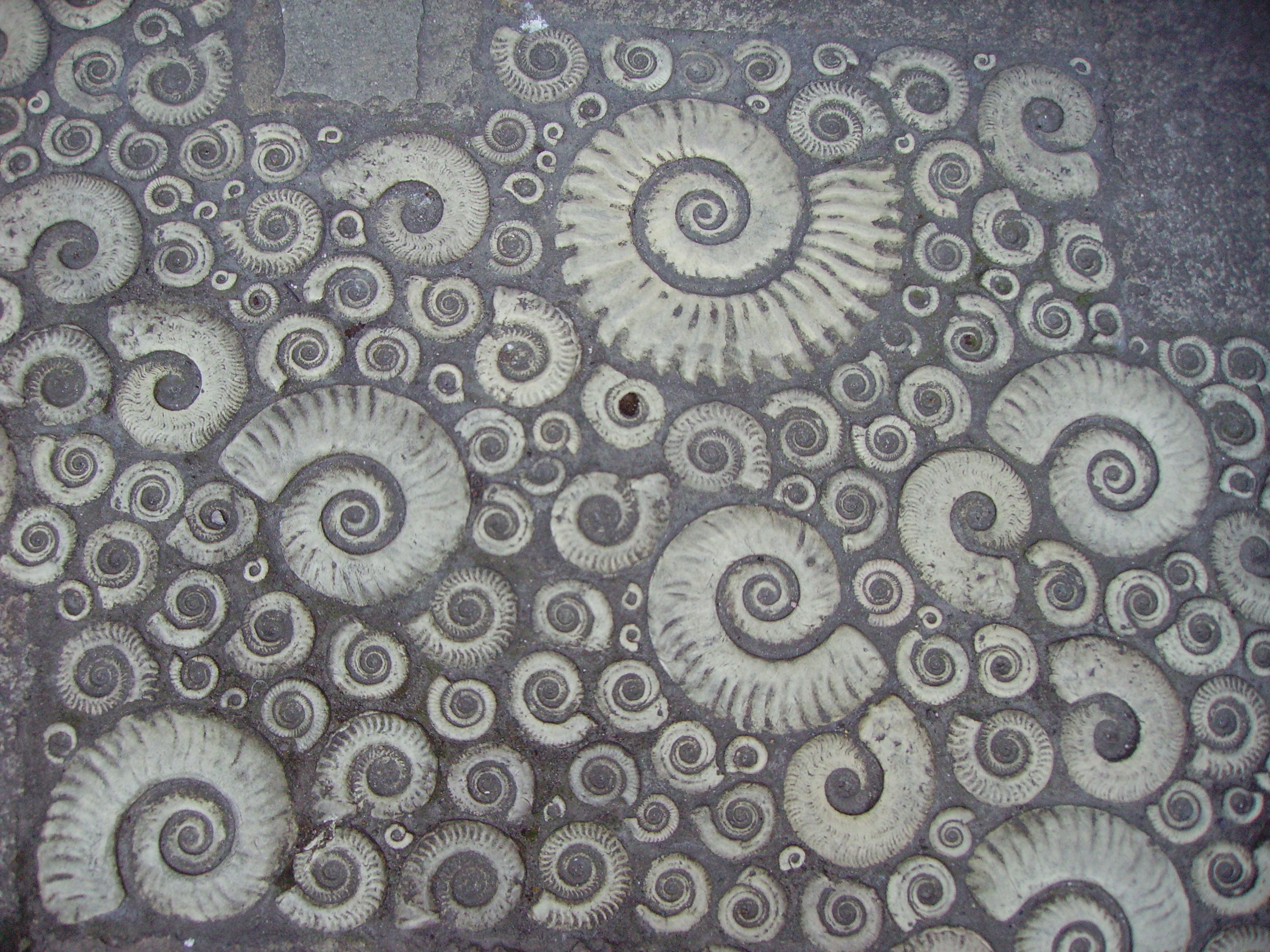
Coade stone fossil ammonites in the pavement outside the museum.

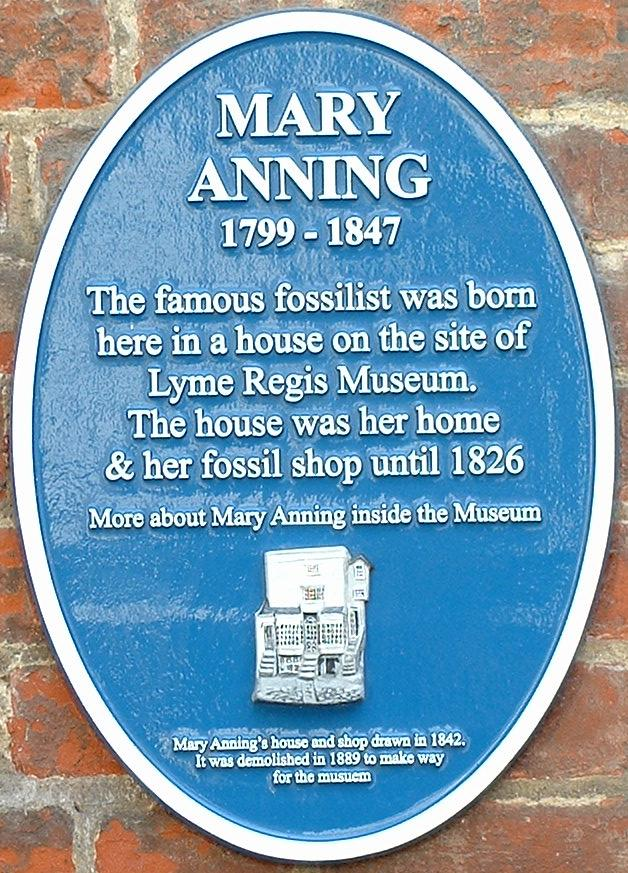
A blue plaque on the museum wall commemorates where Mary Anning was born and had her first fossil shop.

Lyme Regis Philpot Museum is situated in the town of Lyme Regis on the Jurassic Coast in Dorset, England. It is a registered charity under English law. It is built on the site of the former home of the palaeontologist Mary Anning, which existed until 1826.

The museum building was commissioned in 1901 by Thomas Philpot, a relative of the Philpot sisters, fossil collectors and friends of Anning and built in 1902 by architect George Vialls, who also designed the nearby Guildhall (now the Town Hall).

The collections and subject areas exhibited include fossils from the surrounding area dating from the Jurassic period, geology, local maritime history, memorabilia, and writers associated with the town such as Jane Austen and John Fowles. An ornate example of Coade stone work, in the form of ammonites is set into the pavement outside the museum, reflecting both local history (specifically Eleanor Coade, the inventor of Coade stone) and the palaeontology for which Lyme Regis is well known.

== See also ==
- Dinosaurland Fossil Museum
