= Dorsa Sorby =

Wrinkle ridge system on the Moon

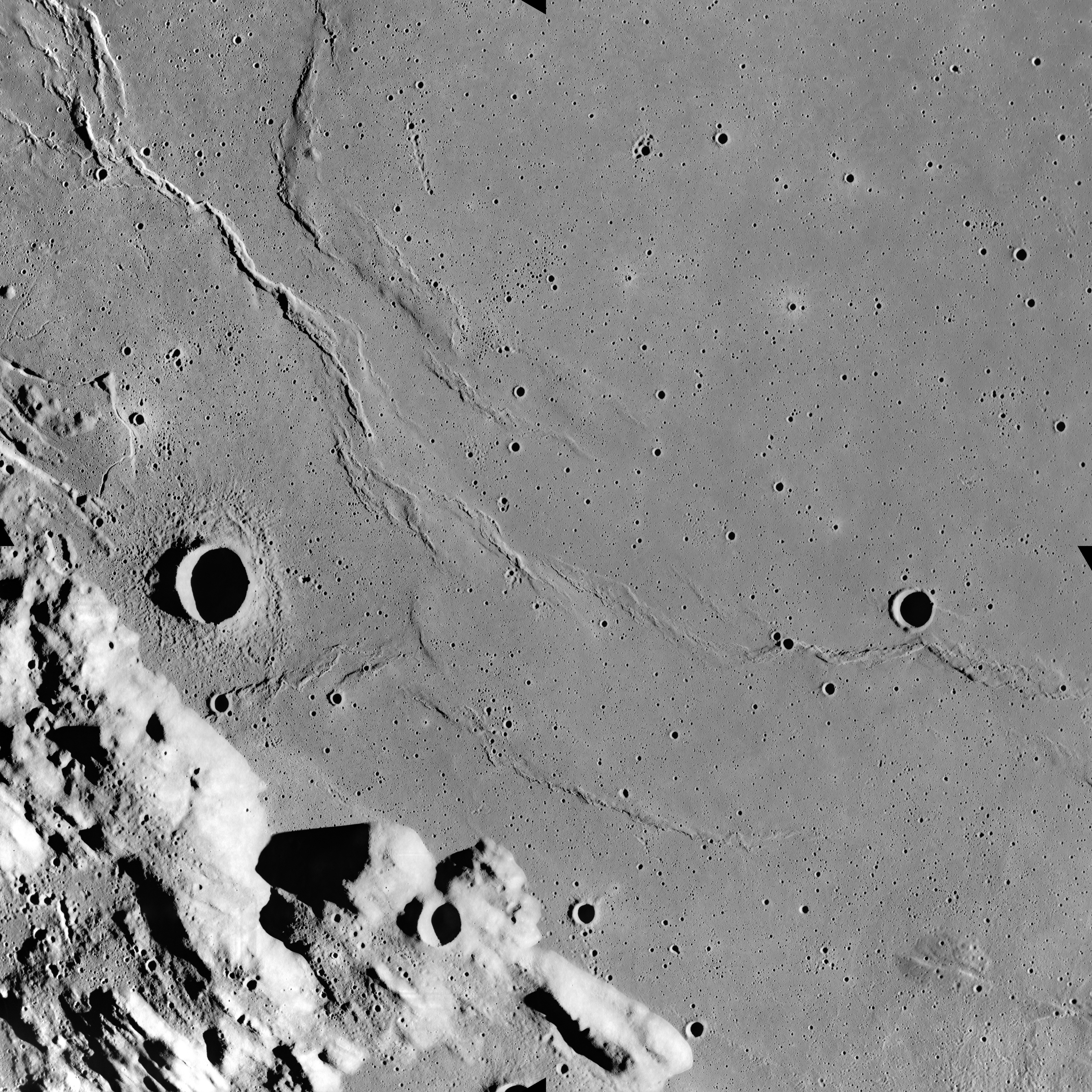
Dorsa Sorby are at the bottom center. Dorsum Buckland are in upper left. Apollo 17 image.

Dorsa Sorby is a wrinkle ridge system at 19.0°N 14.0°E in southern Mare Serenitatis on the Moon. It is 76 km long and was named after British geologist Henry Clifton Sorby in 1976.

Dorsa Sorby is parallel with the larger wrinkle ridge Dorsum Buckland. It is also roughly in line with Rimae Sulpicius Gallus to the northwest and with Rimae Menelaus to the southeast.
