= Buckland Foundation =

UK-based foundation

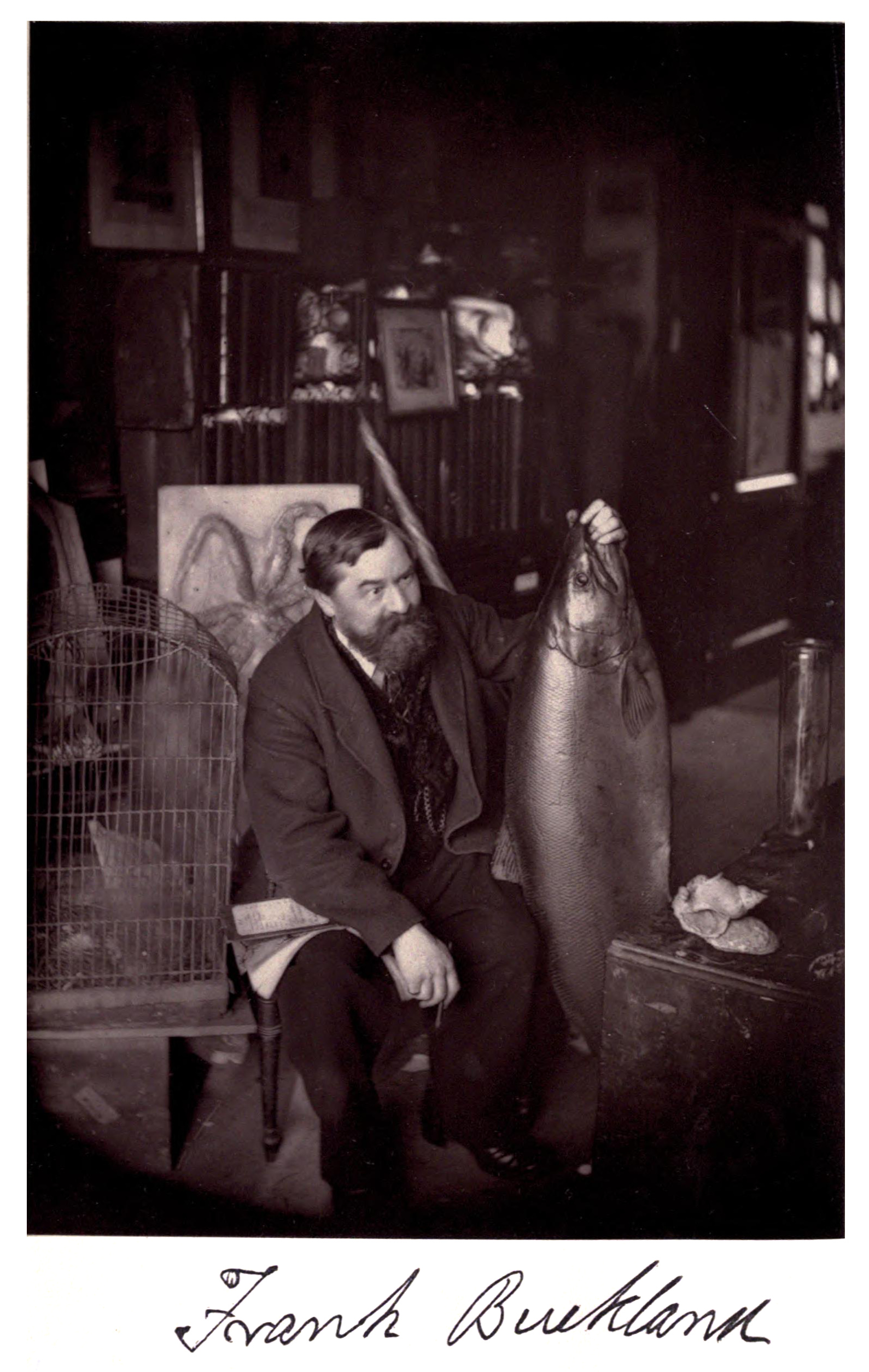
Frank Buckland with some of the exhibits from his Museum of Economic Fish Culture in South Kensington

Francis Trevelyan Buckland (17 December 1826 – 19 December 1880), better known as Frank Buckland, was an English surgeon, zoologist, natural historian, prolific writer, campaigner against river pollution, and researcher on fish-culture and fish farming.

The Buckland Foundation is a charity endowed from Buckland's estate. It funds a 'Buckland Professor' each year to give public talks throughout the United Kingdom and Ireland on matters of current concern in the commercial fisheries or aquaculture industry, as well as acting as custodian for the 'Buckland Collection'.

Frank and his father William Buckland, were determined to do all that they could to improve the diet of the poor. Frank was especially impressed by the potential of the lightly-exploited fisheries of the Victorian era to supply cheap and nutritious food. He was among the first naturalists to realise that making the most of the resources of the sea would require a comprehensive understanding of the biology of the main commercial species and of the world that they inhabited.

Frank was made 'Fish Culturist to the Queen' in 1865. He was appointed as one of two Inspectors of Salmon Fisheries in the Home Office in 1867. He took part in four Commissions of Inquiry into the sea fisheries of England, Wales and Scotland and in doing so also covered white fish, herring and shellfish. The 1878 Commission required Buckland to investigate whether beam trawlers caused wasteful destruction of spawn and as a result were leading to a decline in the supply of fish. One of the recommendations was that "Inspectors should be required to collect statistical and other information and use this to report annually to Parliament on the condition of fisheries", thereby instigating the first systematic fisheries data collection in the United Kingdom.

== Museum of Economic Fish Culture ==
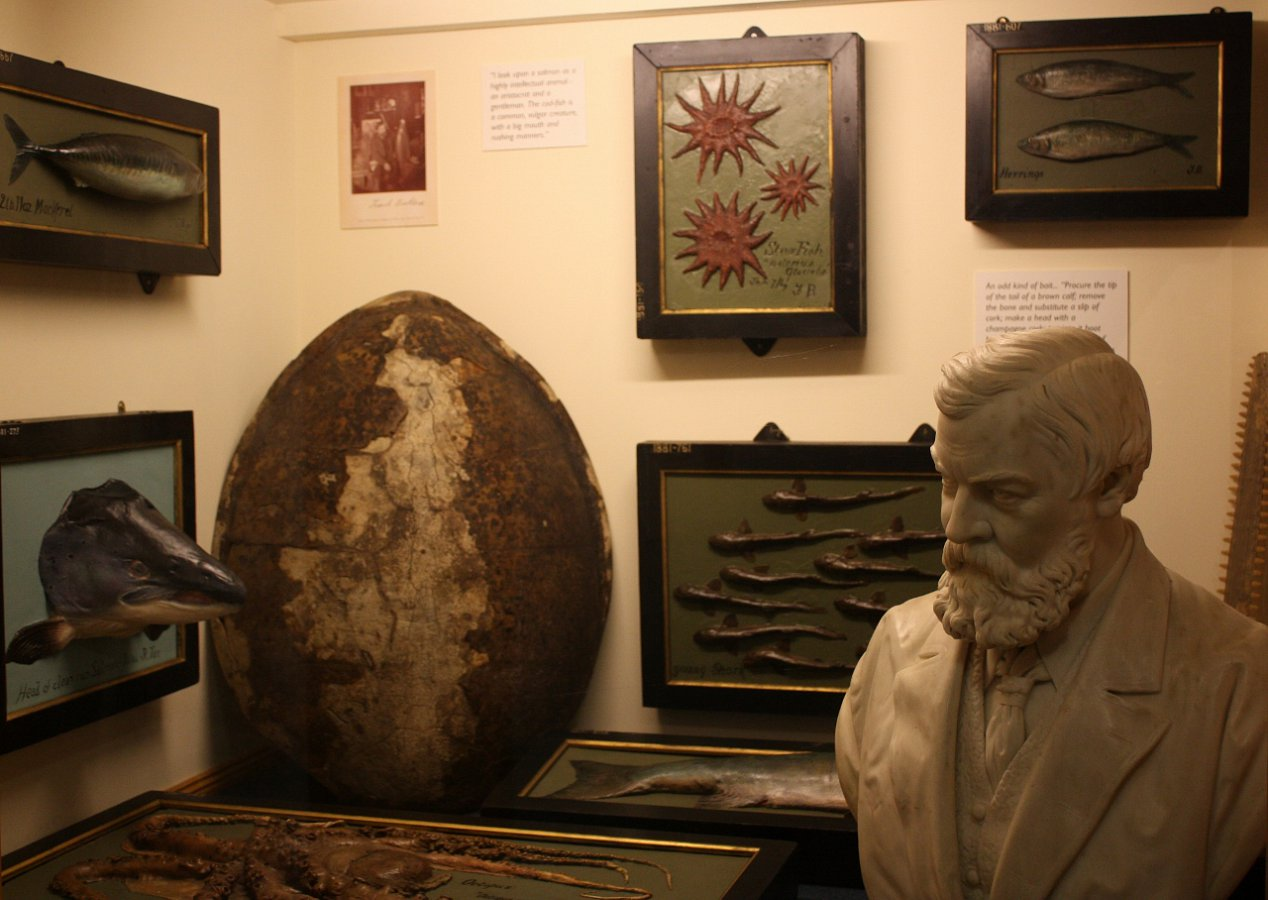
The Buckland Collection, now held at the Scottish Fisheries Museum, Anstruther

Buckland founded a Museum of Economic Fish Culture in South Kensington in 1865. This aimed to inform the public about the fish of the British Isles and their fisheries, and he continued to work on this for the rest of his life. The remaining contents of Buckland's collection are now held by the Scottish Fisheries Museum in Anstruther. These include 45 plaster casts, some of which were hand-painted by the noted garden designer and artist Gertrude Jekyll, and an 1882 marble bust of Buckland by John Warrington Wood. The Scottish Fisheries Museum is also the registered office of the Buckland Foundation.

Two of Buckland's particular enthusiasms were public aquaria and fisheries exhibitions. In 1866 Buckland attended fisheries exhibitions in Arcachon and in Boulogne-Sur-Mer (France) and was awarded medals for his exhibits. Two further exhibitions were held in the Netherlands in 1867 and Buckland was awarded a Diploma of Honour for his contribution. He endeavoured to arouse interest in one being held in Britain but was not successful in this aim until 1881 (after his death), when a 'National Fisheries Exhibition' was held in the city of Norwich.

== Buckland Professors and Lectures ==
Buckland Professors are appointed annually by a board of trustees. A complete list of Buckland Professors and their lecture subjects is provided below.

Source: Buckland Foundation

Buckland Professor	Year	Lecture subject
Walter Garstang	1930	Frank Buckland's Life and Work
W.L.Calderwood	1931	Salmon Hatching and Salmon Migrations
H Wood	1932	The Natural History of the Herring in Scottish Waters
W.C.Hodgson	1933	The Natural History of the Herring in the Southern North Sea
C.F Hickling	1934	The Hake and the Hake Fishery
J.H.Orton	1935	Oyster Biology and Oyster Culture
E.Ford	1936	The Nation's Fish Supply
T.E.Pryce Tarrant	1937	Fish Passes
J.B.Tait	1938	Hydrography in Relation to Fisheries
Michael Graham	1939	Rational Fishing of the Cod in the North Sea
W.J.Menzies	1947	The Stock of Salmon, its Migrations, Preservation and Improvement
G.T.Atkinson	1948	Sea Fisheries
R.S.Wimpenny	1949	The Plaice
H.D.Turing	1950	River Pollution
J.R.Lumby	1951	Fishery Hydrography
F.T.K.Pentalow	1952	River Purification
A.E.J.Went	1953	Irish Salmon and Salmon Fisheries
H.A.Cole	1954	Inshore Fisheries
B.B.Parrish	1956	The Haddock
A.P.Orr	1957	Plankton (Published as the Fertile Sea)
A.R.Bennett	1958	Lemon Sole
R.Balls	1959	Fish Capture
R.J.H.Beverton	1960	Historical Background of International Organisations for Regulating Fisheries, their achievements so far, and prospects for the future
N.A.Mackintosh	1961	The Stocks of Whales
M.E.Varley	1963	British Freshwater Fishes
G.H.O.Burgess	1964	Developments in the Handling and Processing of Fish
H.J.Thomas & A.C.Simpson	1965	The Lobster - its biology and fishery
D.G Tucker	1966	Sonar in Fisheries - a forward look
P.R.Walne	1967	The Artificial Cultivation of Shellfish
A.J.Lee	1969	Ocean Currents and their Influence on Fisheries
C.C.Hemmings	1970	Fish, Nets and Men - An Underwater Approach to Fisheries Research
F.R Harden Jones	1971	Behaviour and the Fisheries
K.A.Pyefinch	1974	Exploitation of the Salmon Stocks
E.Edwards	1977	The Edible Crab and its Fishery
J.J.Connell & R.Hardy	1979	Maximum Use of British Aquatic Food Resources
J.Mason	1980	Scallop and Queen Fisheries in the British Isles
A.Preston & P.C.Wood	1981	Marine Pollution and its Effect on Fisheries
G.Eddie	1982	Engineering, Economics and Fisheries Management
G.Buchan	1983	A Story of the Herring
S.J.Lockwood	1984	Mackerel – its biology, assessment and the management of a fishery
R.J.Roberts	1985	Aquaculture
C.Chapman	1987	The Norway Lobster
C.T.Macer	1988	North Sea Cod
W.M.Shearer	1989	Atlantic Salmon
R.Lloyd	1990	Pollution and Freshwater fisheries
M.J.Holden	1991	The Common Fisheries Policy: Past, Present and Future
R.Bailey	1992	Industrial Fisheries, Fish Stocks and Seabirds
S.Gubbay	1993	Marine Protected Areas and Fisheries
J.D.M.Gordon	1994	Deep-Sea Fisheries: a new resource?
B.E.Spencer	1995	Bivalve Cultivation in the UK: structuring influences
J.S.Gray	1996	Protecting the seas: using science for a better environment
JP.Holligan	1997	Global Change in the Coastal Zone - implications for fisheries
M.Angel	1998	The Deep Ocean: Use and Misuse
C.Moriarty	1999	The European Eel
D.Symes	2000	Integrated fisheries management – a challenge for the Common Fisheries Policy
C.P.Reid	2001	Plankton and Fisheries
R Ferro	2002	Fish Conservation and the design of fishing gear
J Goodlad	2003	Fishing and Fish Farming - are they conflicting or complementary industries?
J Addison	2004	Science and the management of the United Kingdom's Crab Fisheries
J.Armstrong	2005	The conservation of Salmon habitat
B Deas	2006	Regional Advisory Councils and the Future of Fisheries Policy
W Turrell	2007	Climate change and Scottish Fisheries
M.Beveridge	2008	Aquaculture, the Blue Revolution?
D Righton	2009	Cod in the North Sea
R Uglow	2010	Crustacean transport
A Walker	2011	Variation amongst brown trout and sea trout (Salmo trutta L.)
I.L. Boyd	2012	Future Approaches to Fisheries Science
S. Holt	2013	Why Maximum Sustainable Yield (MSY)?
M.Windsor	2014	Managing migratory fish by international treaty: the strengths and weaknesses
Colin Bannister	2015	Has EU fisheries management achieved stock recovery?
Felicity Huntingford	2016	How smart are fish and why does this matter to fishers?
Paul Hart	2017	Stewards of the Sea: Returning Power to Fishers
Ronald Campbell	2018	The History of Salmon Management in the British Isles
Lucy Hawkes	2019	Atlantic Bluefin Tuna: Superfish of the Oceans
Steven Mackinson	2021-22	Resurrection: the fall and rise of industry participation in fisheries science.
Baukje de Roos	2023	Fish as friends and food: The significance of Frank Buckland's observations and ideas for current fish consumption patterns
Sophy McCully Phillips	2024	Sharks, skates and rays: consume, conserve, consider?
Martyn Lucas	2025-26	Silver leapers and blood-sucking beasts: Fish that migrate between stream and ocean and their relationship with humans

== See also ==
- Francis Trevelyan Buckland
- Fisheries science
- Scottish Fisheries Museum
