= William Buckland =

English palaeontologist (1784–1856)

The Very Reverend, The Reverend William Buckland FRS
- Dean of Westminster
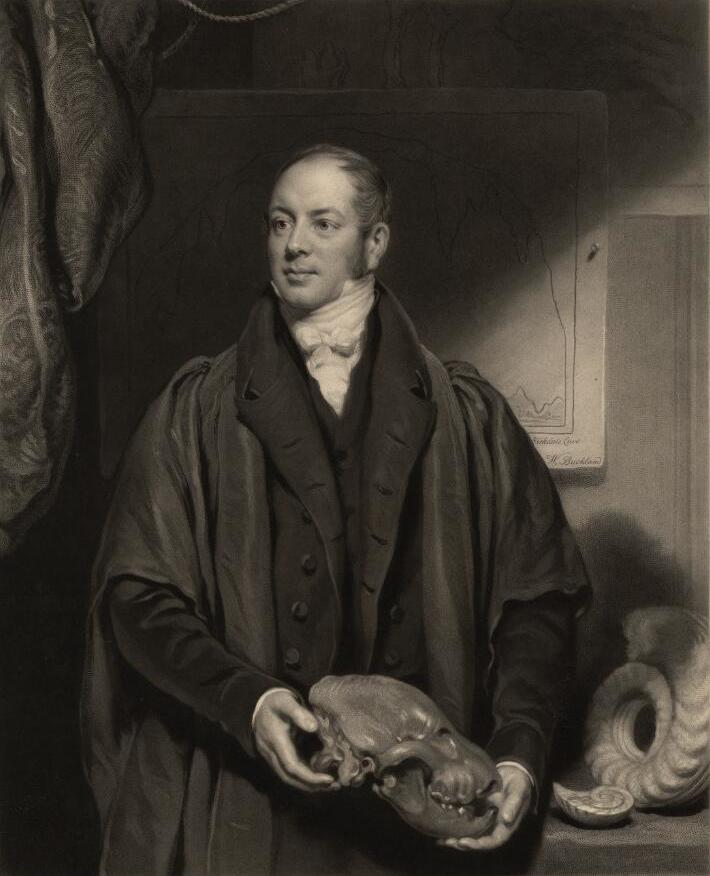
- Buckland in 1833

Personal details
- Born: 12 March 1784 Axminster, Devon, England
- Died: 14 August 1856 (aged 72) Islip, Oxfordshire, England
- Denomination: Anglican
- Spouse: Mary Morland (m. 1825)
- Children: 9, including Frank Buckland
- Education: Winchester College, Corpus Christi College, Oxford
- Scientific career
- Known for: Megalosaurus, coprolites
- Awards: Copley Medal (1822); Wollaston Medal (1848)
- Fields: Palaeontology

William Buckland DD, FRS (12 March 1784 – 14 August 1856) was an English theologian, geologist and palaeontologist.

His work in the early 1820s proved that Kirkdale Cave in North Yorkshire had been a prehistoric hyena den, for which he was awarded the Copley Medal. It was praised as an example of how scientific analysis could reconstruct events in the distant past. He pioneered the use of fossilised faeces in reconstructing ecosystems, coining the term coprolites. Buckland also wrote the first full account of a fossil dinosaur, which he named Megalosaurus in 1824. He also discovered the so-called Red Lady of Paviland, one of the first discovered human skeletons now recognised as coming from the Upper Palaeolithic.

Buckland followed the Gap Theory in interpreting the biblical account of Genesis as two widely separated episodes of creation. It had emerged as a way to reconcile the scriptural account with discoveries in geology suggesting the earth was very old. Early in his career Buckland believed he had found evidence of the biblical flood, but later saw that the glaciation theory of Louis Agassiz gave a better explanation, and played a significant role in promoting it.

Buckland served as Dean of Westminster from 1845 until his death in 1856.

== Early life ==
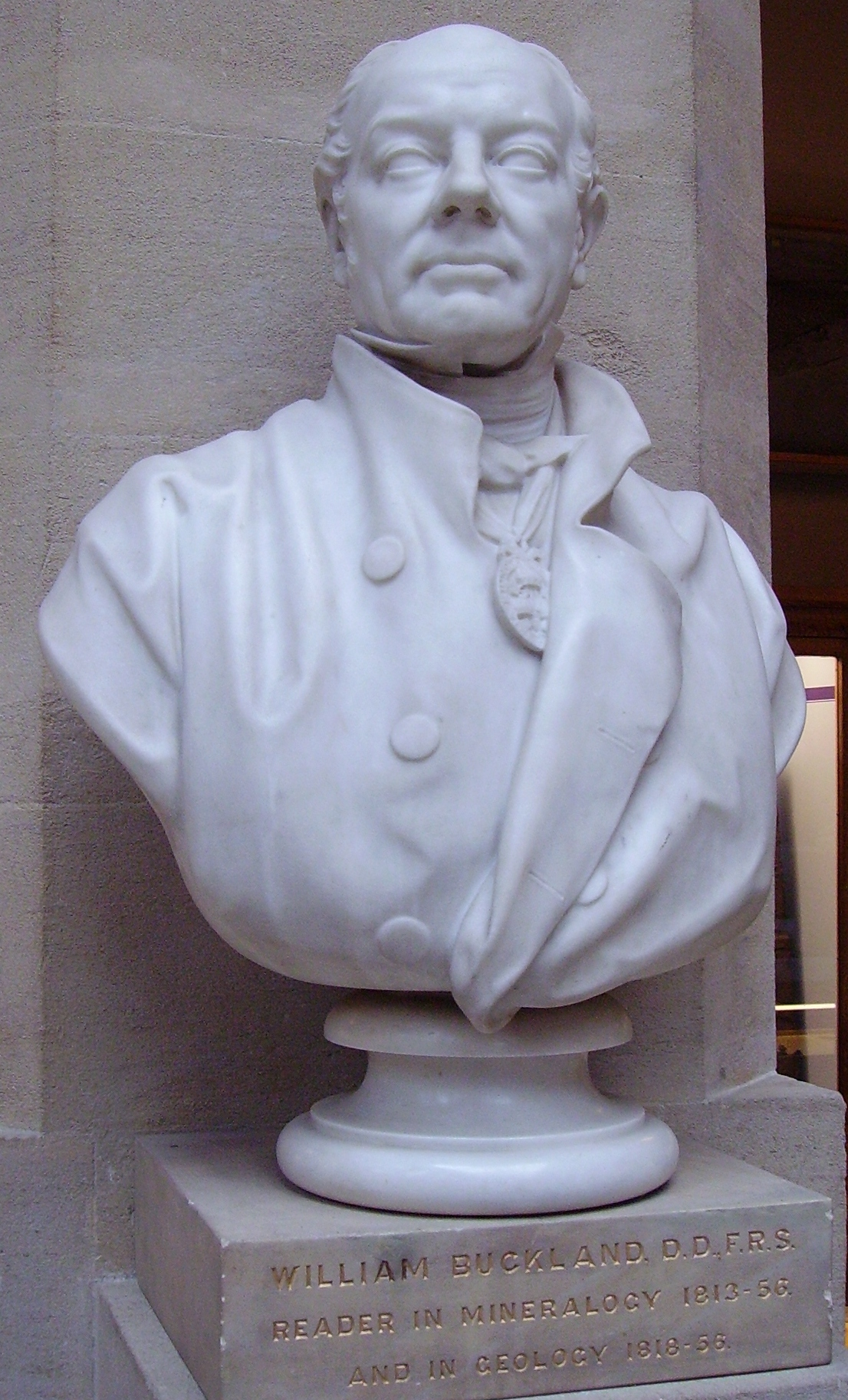
Bust of Buckland in the Oxford University Museum of Natural History

Buckland was born at Axminster in Devon and, as a child, would accompany his father, the Rector of Templeton and Trusham, on his walks where interest in road improvements led to collecting fossil shells, including ammonites, from the Early Jurassic Lias rocks exposed in local quarries.

He was educated first at Blundell's School, Tiverton, Devon, and then at Winchester College, from where he won a scholarship to Corpus Christi College, Oxford, matriculating in 1801 and graduating BA in 1805. He also attended lectures of John Kidd on mineralogy and chemistry, developed an interest in geology, and carried out field research on strata during his vacations. He went on to obtain his MA degree in 1808, became a Fellow of Corpus Christi in 1809, and was ordained as a priest. He continued to make frequent geological excursions, on horseback, to various parts of England, Scotland, Ireland and Wales.

In 1813, Buckland was appointed Reader in mineralogy, in succession to John Kidd, giving lively and popular lectures with increasing emphasis on geology and palaeontology. As an unofficial curator of the Ashmolean Museum, he built up collections, touring Europe and coming into contact with scholars including Georges Cuvier.

== Career, work and discoveries ==
=== Rejection of flood geology and Kirkdale Cave ===
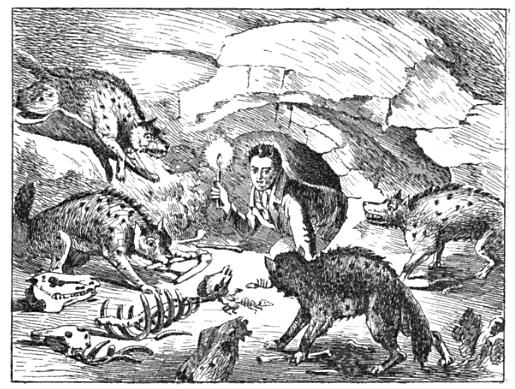
William Conybeare drew this cartoon of Buckland poking his head into a prehistoric hyaena den in 1822 to celebrate Buckland's ground breaking analysis of the fossils found in Kirkdale Cave.

In 1818, Buckland was elected a fellow of the Royal Society. That year he persuaded the Prince Regent to endow an additional Readership, this time in Geology and he became the first holder of the new appointment, delivering his inaugural address on 15 May 1819. This was published in 1820 as Vindiciæ Geologiæ; or the Connexion of Geology with Religion explained, both justifying the new science of geology and reconciling geological evidence with the biblical accounts of creation and Noah's Flood.

At a time when others were coming under the opposing influence of James Hutton's theory of uniformitarianism, Buckland developed a new hypothesis that the word "beginning" in Genesis meant an undefined period between the origin of the earth and the creation of its current inhabitants, during which a long series of extinctions and successive creations of new kinds of plants and animals had occurred. Thus, his catastrophism theory incorporated a version of Old Earth creationism or Gap creationism. Buckland believed in a global deluge during the time of Noah but was not a supporter of flood geology as he believed that only a small amount of the strata could have been formed in the single year occupied by the deluge.

From his investigations of fossil bones at Kirkdale Cave, in Yorkshire, he concluded that the cave had actually been inhabited by hyaenas in antediluvian times, and that the fossils were the remains of these hyaenas and the animals they had eaten, rather than being remains of animals that had perished in the Flood and then carried from the tropics by the surging waters, as he and others had at first thought. In 1822 he wrote:

It must already appear probable, from the facts above described, particularly from the comminuted state and apparently gnawed condition of the bones, that the cave in Kirkdale was, during a long succession of years, inhabited as a den of hyaenas, and that they dragged into its recesses the other animal bodies whose remains are found mixed indiscriminately with their own: this conjecture is rendered almost certain by the discovery I made, of many small balls of the solid calcareous excrement of an animal that had fed on bones... It was at first sight recognised by the keeper of the Menagerie at Exeter Change, as resembling, in both form and appearance, the faeces of the spotted or cape hyaena, which he stated to be greedy of bones beyond all other beasts in his care.

Buckland arranged for a young spotted hyena, nicknamed "Billy" to be brought to England from Africa so that its feeding and defecatory habits could be studied and compared to the Kirkdale Cave finds. While criticised by some, Buckland's analysis of Kirkland Cave and other bone caves was widely seen as a model for how careful analysis could be used to reconstruct the Earth's past, and the Royal Society awarded Buckland the Copley Medal in 1822 for his paper on Kirkdale Cave. At the presentation the society's president, Humphry Davy, said:

by these inquiries, a distinct epoch has, as it were, been established in the history of the revolutions of our globe: a point fixed from which our researches may be pursued through the immensity of ages, and the records of animate nature, as it were, carried back to the time of the creation.

While Buckland's analysis convinced him that the bones found in Kirkdale Cave had not been washed into the cave by a global flood, he still believed the thin layer of mud that covered the remains of the hyaena den had been deposited in the subsequent 'Universal Deluge'. He developed these ideas into his great scientific work Reliquiæ Diluvianæ, or, Observations on the Organic Remains attesting the Action of a Universal Deluge which was published in 1823 and became a best seller. However, over the next decade as geology continued to progress Buckland changed his mind. In his famous Bridgewater Treatise, published in 1836, he acknowledged that the biblical account of Noah's flood could not be confirmed using geological evidence. By 1840 he was very actively promoting the view that what had been interpreted as evidence of the 'Universal Deluge' two decades earlier, and subsequently of deep submergence by a new generation of geologists such as Charles Lyell, was in fact evidence of a major glaciation.

=== Megalosaurus ===
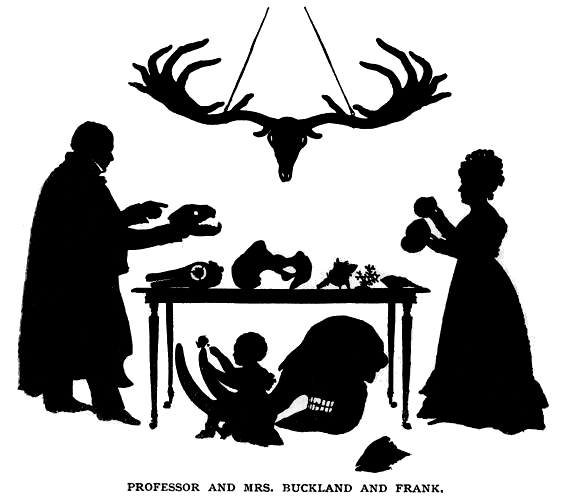
Buckland family silhouette

He continued to live in Corpus Christi College and, in 1824, he became president of the Geological Society of London. Here he announced the discovery, at Stonesfield, of fossil bones of a giant reptile which he named Megalosaurus ('great lizard') and wrote the first full account of what would later be called a dinosaur.

In 1825, Buckland was elected a Foreign Honorary Member of the American Academy of Arts and Sciences. That year he resigned his college fellowship: he planned to take up the living of Stoke Charity in Hampshire but, before he could take up the appointment, he was made a Canon of Christ Church, a rich reward for academic distinction without serious administrative responsibilities.

=== Marriage ===
In December 1825 he married Mary Morland of Abingdon, Oxfordshire, an accomplished illustrator and collector of fossils. Their honeymoon was a year touring Europe, with visits to famous geologists and geological sites. She continued to assist him in his work, as well as having nine children, five of whom survived to adulthood. His son Frank Buckland became a well known practical naturalist, author, and Inspector of Salmon Fisheries.

On one occasion, Mary helped him decipher footmarks found in a slab of sandstone by covering the kitchen table with paste, while he fetched their pet tortoise and confirmed his intuition, that tortoise footprints matched the fossil marks. His daughter, author Elizabeth Oke Buckland Gordon, wrote a biography of her father that included appendices of positions held by Buckland, his membership in professional societies, and an index of his publications.

=== The Red Lady of Paviland ===
On 18 January 1823 Buckland walked into Paviland Cave in south Wales, where he discovered a skeleton which he named the Red Lady of Paviland, as he at first supposed it to be the remains of a local prostitute. Although Buckland found the skeleton in Paviland Cave in the same strata as the bones of extinct mammals (including mammoth), Buckland shared the view of Georges Cuvier that no humans had coexisted with any extinct animals, and he attributed the skeleton's presence there to a grave having been dug in historical times, possibly by the same people who had constructed some nearby pre-Roman fortifications, into the older layers.

Carbon-data tests have since dated the skeleton, now known to be male as from circa 33,000 years before present (BP). It is the oldest anatomically modern human found in the United Kingdom.

=== Coprolites and the Liassic food chain ===
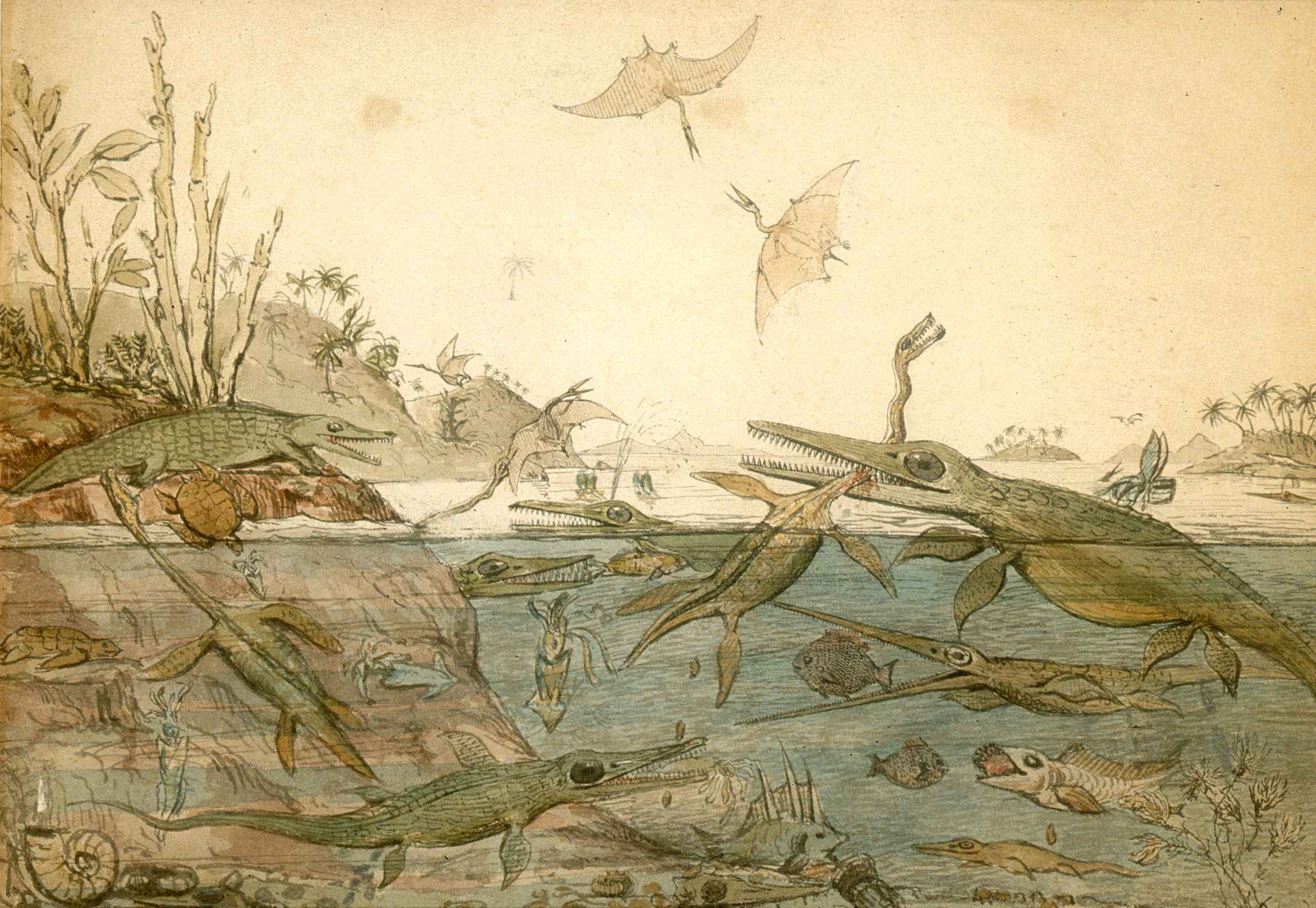
Duria Antiquior – A more Ancient Dorset, 1830 watercolour by Henry De la Beche, based on Buckland's account of Mary Anning's discoveries

The fossil hunter Mary Anning noticed that stony objects known as "bezoar stones" were often found in the abdominal region of ichthyosaur skeletons found in the Lias formation at Lyme Regis. She also noted that if such stones were broken open they often contained fossilised fish bones and scales, and sometimes bones from small ichthyosaurs. These observations by Anning led Buckland to propose in 1829 that the stones were fossilised faeces. He coined the name coprolite for them; the name came to be the general name for all fossilised faeces.

Buckland also concluded that the spiral markings on the fossils indicated that ichthyosaurs had spiral ridges in their intestines similar to those of modern sharks, and that some of these coprolites were black because the ichthyosaur had ingested ink sacs from belemnites. He wrote a vivid description of the Liassic food chain based on these observations, which would inspire Henry De la Beche to paint Duria Antiquior, the first pictorial representation of a scene from the distant past. After De le Beche had a lithographic print made based on his original watercolour, Buckland kept a supply of the prints on hand to circulate at his lectures. He also discussed other similar objects found in other formations, including the fossilised hyena dung he had found in Kirkdale Cave. He concluded:

In all these various formations our Coprolites form records of warfare, waged by successive generations of inhabitants of our planet on one another: the imperishable phosphate of lime, derived from their digested skeletons, has become embalmed in the substance and foundations of the everlasting hills; and the general law of Nature which bids all to eat and be eaten in their turn, is shown to have been co-extensive with animal existence on our globe; the Carnivora in each period of the world's history fulfilling their destined office, – to check excess in the progress of life, and maintain the balance of creation.

Buckland had been helping and encouraging Roderick Murchison for some years, and in 1831 was able to suggest a good starting point in South Wales for Murchison's researches into the rocks beneath the secondary strata associated with the age of reptiles. Murchison would later name these older strata, characterised by marine invertebrate fossils, as Silurian, after a tribe that had lived in that area centuries earlier. In 1832 Buckland presided over the second meeting of the British Association, which was then held at Oxford.

=== Bridgewater Treatise ===
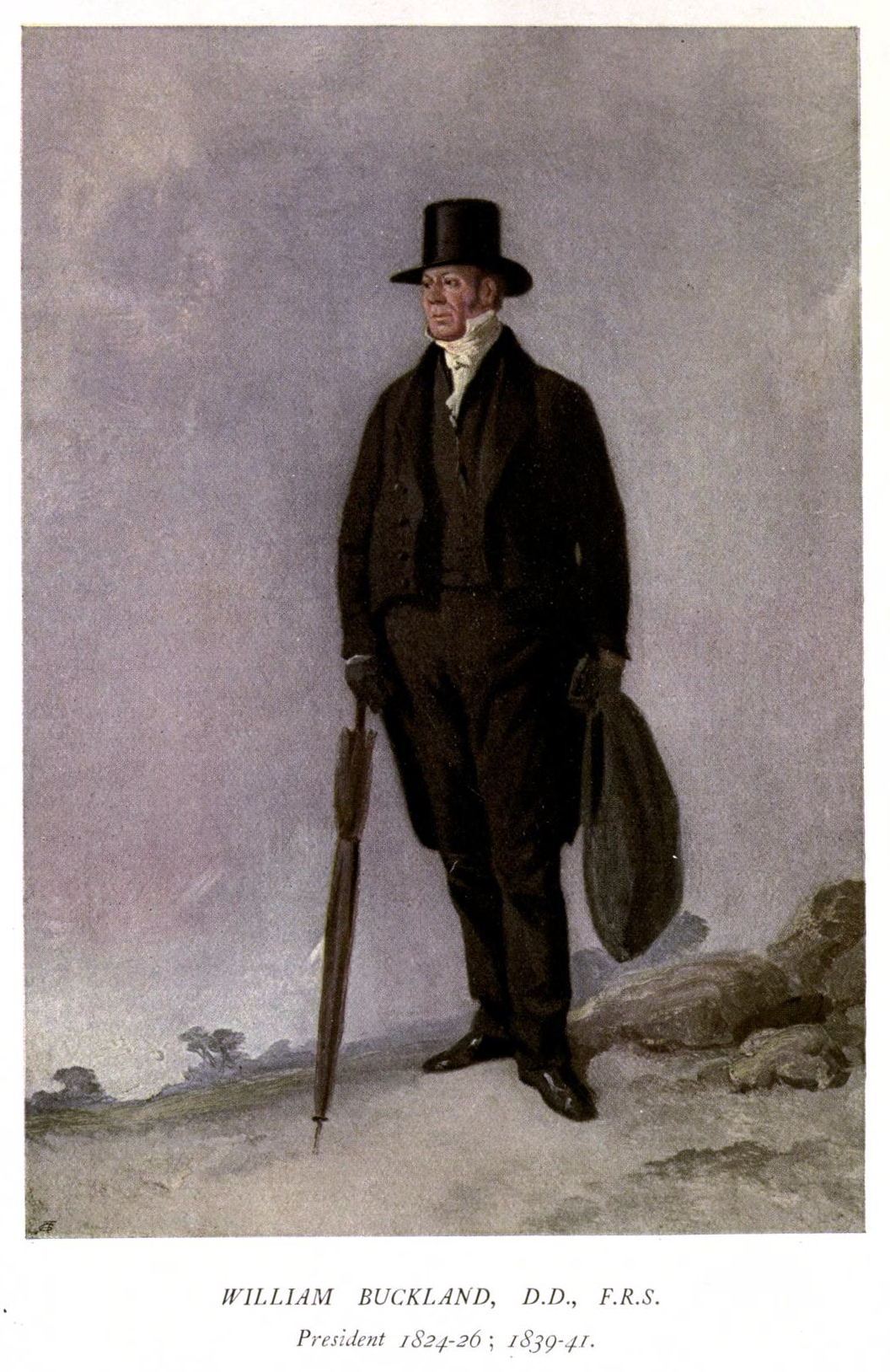
Portrait by Richard Ansdell

Buckland was commissioned to contribute one of the set of eight Bridgewater Treatises, "On the Power, Wisdom and Goodness of God, as manifested in the Creation". This took him almost five years' work and was published in 1836 with the title Geology and Mineralogy considered with reference to Natural Theology. His volume included a detailed compendium of his theories of day-age, gap theory and a form of progressive creationism where faunal succession revealed by the fossil record was explained by a series of successive divine creations that prepared the earth for humans. In the introduction he expressed the argument from design by asserting that the families and phyla of biology were "clusters of contrivance":

The myriads of petrified Remains which are disclosed by the researches of Geology all tend to prove that our Planet has been occupied in times preceding the Creation of the Human Race, by extinct species of Animals and Vegetables, made up, like living Organic Bodies, of 'Clusters of Contrivances,' which demonstrate the exercise of stupendous Intelligence and Power. They further show that these extinct forms of Organic Life were so closely allied, by Unity in the principles of their construction, to Classes, Orders, and Families, which make up the existing Animal and Vegetable Kingdoms, that they not only afford an argument of surpassing force, against the doctrines of the Atheist and Polytheist; but supply a chain of connected evidence, amounting to demonstration, of the continuous Being, and of many of the highest Attributes of the One Living and True God.

Following Charles Darwin's return from the Beagle voyage, Buckland discussed with him the Galapagos land iguanas and Marine iguanas. He subsequently recommended Darwin's paper on the role of earthworms in soil formation for publication, praising it as "a new & important theory to explain Phenomena of universal occurrence on the surface of the Earth—in fact a new Geological Power", while rightly rejecting Darwin's suggestion that chalkland could have been formed in a similar way.

=== Glaciation theory ===
By this time Buckland was a prominent and influential scientific celebrity and a friend of the Tory prime minister, Sir Robert Peel. In co-operation with Adam Sedgwick and Charles Lyell, he prepared the report leading to the establishment of the Geological Survey of Great Britain.

Having become interested in the theory of Louis Agassiz, that polished and striated rocks as well as transported material, had been caused by ancient glaciers, he travelled to Switzerland, in 1838, to meet Agassiz and see for himself. He was convinced and was reminded of what he had seen in Scotland, Wales and northern England but had previously attributed to the Flood. When Agassiz came to Britain for the Glasgow meeting of the British Association, in 1840, they went on an extended tour of Scotland and found evidence there of former glaciation. In that year Buckland had become president of the Geological Society again and, despite their hostile reaction to his presentation of the theory, he was now satisfied that glaciation had been the origin of much of the surface deposits covering Britain.

In 1845 he was appointed by Sir Robert Peel to the vacant Deanery of Westminster (he succeeded Samuel Wilberforce). Soon after, he was inducted to the living of Islip, near Oxford, a preferment attached to the deanery. As Dean and head of Chapter, Buckland was involved in repair and maintenance of Westminster Abbey and in preaching suitable sermons to the rural population of Islip, while continuing to lecture on geology at Oxford. In 1847, he was appointed a trustee in the British Museum and, in 1848, he was awarded the Wollaston Medal by the Geological Society of London.

== Illness and death ==
Around the end of 1850, William Buckland contracted a disorder of the neck and brain, and died of it in 1856. Frank Buckland reported that an autopsy showed "the portion of the base of the skull upon which the brain rested, together with the two upper vertebrae of the neck, to be in an advanced state of caries, or decay. The irritation...was quite sufficient cause to give rise to all symptoms." Frank Buckland attributed the cause of death of both his parents to a severe accident years earlier.

The plot for William's grave had been reserved, but when the gravedigger set to work, it was found that an outcrop of solid Jurassic limestone lay just below ground level and explosives had to be used for excavation. This may have been a last jest by the noted geologist, reminiscent of Richard Whately's Elegy intended for Professor Buckland written in 1820:

Where shall we our great Professor inter
That in peace may rest his bones?
If we hew him a rocky sepulchre
He'll rise and break the stones
And examine each stratum that lies around
For he's quite in his element underground

== Known eccentricities ==
Buckland preferred to do his field palaeontology and geological work wearing an academic gown. His lectures were notable for their dramatic delivery. When he lectured indoors he would bring his presentations to life by imitating the movements of the dinosaurs under discussion. Buckland's passion for scientific observation and experiment extended to his home, where he had a table inlaid with dinosaur coprolites. The original table top is exhibited at the Lyme Regis Museum.

Not only was William Buckland's home filled with specimens – animal as well as mineral, live as well as dead – but he claimed that he wanted to eat at least one individual of all animal species. Reportedly according to an anecdote recounted by Augustus Hare, the most distasteful animals Buckland consumed were in his opinion mole and bluebottle fly. Ostrich, hedgehogs, tortoises, rats, frogs and snails were among animals reportedly served to guests, with Buckland also having been reported as consuming alligators, young dogs, and mice. He was followed in this hobby by his son Frank.

One story recounted by Peter Lund Simmonds in 1859 reports that Buckland served soup to his guests before claiming that it was an alligator that he had dissected earlier that day, to the guests significant shock and discomfort. When asked if he had really served an alligator, he reportedly responded "as good a calf's head as ever wore a coronet". Another account suggests that Buckland served his guests pickled horse tongue at a luncheon without initially telling them what they were eating.

According to a widely repeated story, Buckland consumed, maybe accidentally, a portion of the mummified heart of the French King Louis XIV during a dinner at Nuneham House, though the veracity of this particular story has been questioned. The Louis XIV heart story goes back at least as far as an 1863 book by Nathaniel Hawthorne.

Charles Darwin criticised Buckland for his behaviour in his autobiography, saying that "Buckland, who though very good-humoured and good-natured, seemed to me a vulgar and almost coarse man. He was incited more by a craving for notoriety, which sometimes made him act like a buffoon, than by a love of science."

== Legacy ==
Dorsum Buckland, a wrinkle ridge on the Moon, is named after him. Buckland Island (known today as Ani-Jima), in the Bonin Islands (Ogasawara-Jima), was named after him by Captain Beechey on 9 June 1827. In 1846, William Buckland was rector of St. Nicholas in Islip and is commemorated on a plaque in the south aisle of the church and the "East Window" was dedicated to the memory of Buckland and his wife in 1861. A plaque is dedicated to him near his summer home by the Old Rectory, The Walk, Islip (10 August 2008). There is also a bust by Henry Weekes in the south aisle at Westminster Abbey.

In 1972, botanist Heikki Roivainen circumscribed Bucklandiella, a genus of moss in the family Grimmiaceae, which was named in his honour. Buckland Peaks in New Zealand's Paparoa Range was named after him.

The Iñupiat village of Buckland (Inupiaq: Nunatchiaq) in Alaska's Northwest Arctic Borough takes its English name from William Buckland, being named by Royal Navy officer Frederick William Beechey in 1826.

== See also ==
- History of palaeontology
