= Henry Clifton Sorby =

British scientist, founder of microscopical petrology and metallography (1826–1908)

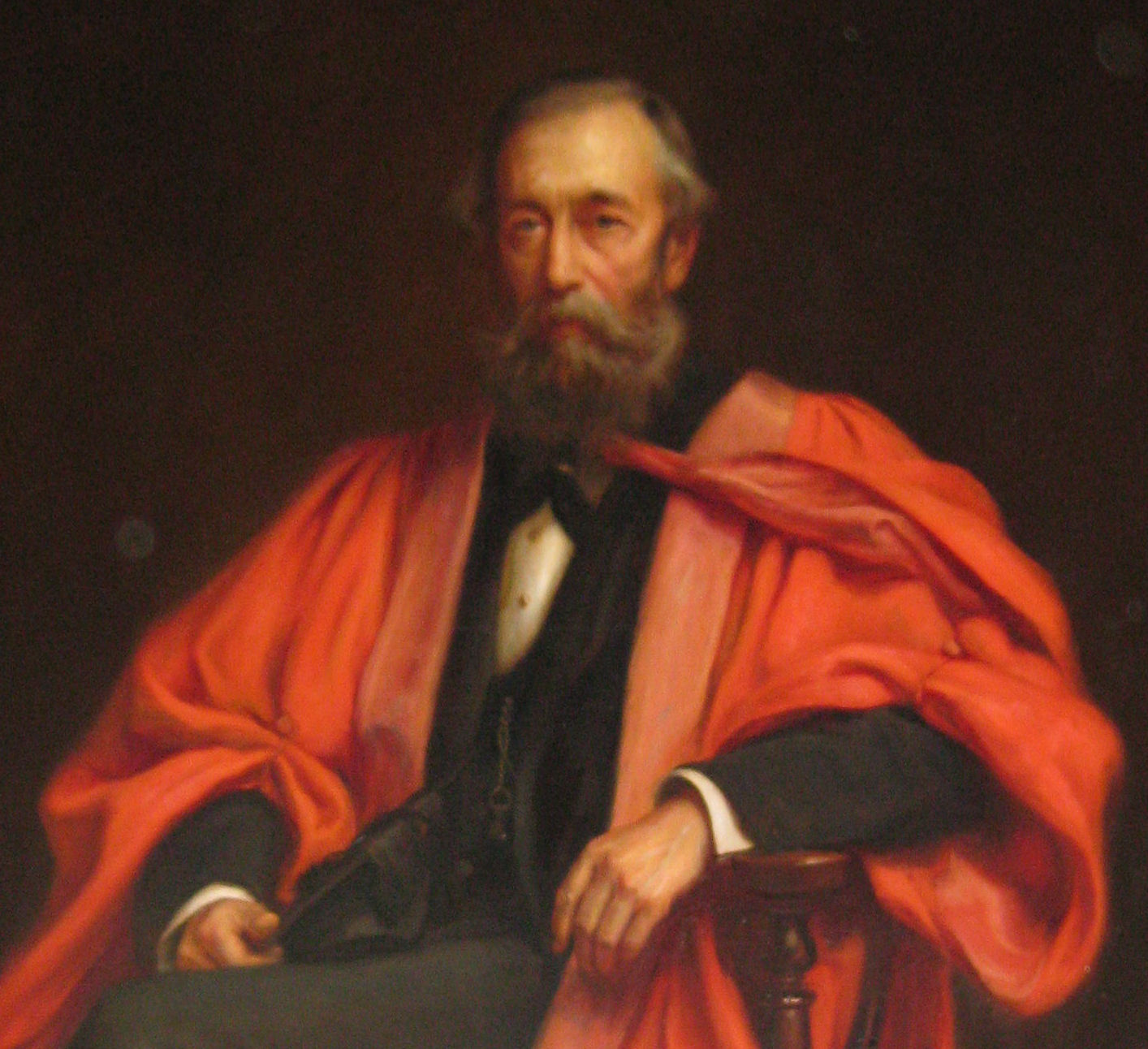
- Henry Clifton Sorby. Portrait in Mappin Hall, University of Sheffield
- Born: 10 May 1826; Woodbourne near Sheffield in Yorkshire, England
- Died: 9 March 1908 (aged 81); Sheffield, England
- Awards: Wollaston Medal (1869); Royal Medal (1874)

Henry Clifton Sorby (10 May 1826 – 9 March 1908) was an English amateur microscopist and geologist. His major contribution was the development of techniques for thin sectioning of rocks and minerals with polarized light under a microscope which was also extended to study iron and steel, his family having been involved in the Sheffield iron and steel industry for generations. He also contributed to the study of meteorites by introducing a method of blowpipe analysis where molten beads were flattened for microscopic study. He was elected Fellow of the Royal Society in 1857.

== Early life, family background, and education ==
Sorby was born at Woodbourne, near Sheffield in Yorkshire, to Henry Sorby (1790-1846) and Amelia Lambert(1797-1872). His father Henry was one of twelve children of John Sorby (1775-1829) of Spital Hill, Sheffield and Elizabeth Swallow (1761-1829) of Attercliffe Forge, Sheffield. The family had a business in iron production from the early 17th century. An older sister of his father Henry, Anne had married Henry Hartop, a Sheffield steel industry manager. He had built Woodbourn House where Sorby's father and lived from 1822. While another uncle John Francis married Hartop's daughter Amelia, yet another, Alfred married Amelia's sister Ann Lambert. The family was thus deeply connected in the Sheffield industry. They also owned land at the Orgreave Hall Estate where there were coal seams and sandstone quarries. Sorby attended Sheffield Collegiate School leaving it in 1841. He early on developed an interest in natural science through the influence of his father who had an interest in geology, as well as the private tutor Rev. Walter Mitchell who had graduated from Cambridge. He also studied German around 1845, possibly under William Fochlander and this would allow Sorby to study the work of Justus von Liebig. One of his first papers related to the excavation of valleys in Yorkshire. In 1847, when he was 21, his father died, leaving him a comfortable private income. He immediately established a scientific laboratory and workshop at his home.

== Pioneering work in petrography and microscopical geology ==
Sorby had an interest in geology and was involved in the Geological and Polytechnic Society between 1845 and 1846. He subsequently dealt with the physical geography of former geological periods, with the wave-structure in certain stratified rocks, and the origin of slaty cleavage.

Sorby began to produce thin slices of hard rocks based on the methods used in zoology that he had learned from professor William Crawford Williamson. He also began to use polarized light to examine the thin transparent sections of rocks. He took up the study of rocks and minerals under the microscope, and published an important memoir, "On the Microscopical Structure of Crystals", in 1858 (Quart. Journ. Geol. Soc.). He then introduced spectrographic analysis techniques. In England, he was one of the pioneers in petrography; he was awarded the Wollaston medal by the Geological Society of London in 1869, and became its president. In his presidential addresses, Sorby gave the results of original research on the structure and origin of limestones and of non-calcareous stratified rocks (1879–1880).

In the mid-Victorian years, Sorby was also the first to study the cleavage of slates using a microscope. In the frame of an ardent debate on the origin and mechanism of the slatey cleavage with the Irish physicist John Tyndall, who was also a pioneering mountain climber (Tyndall's name is also associated with the "Golden age of alpinism") and visited the Alps mountains in 1856 for scientific reasons, Sorby devised a quote now famous:

Mountains must indeed be examined with the microscope.

Sorby was one of the first to understand the role and the importance of microscopic processes to explain material deformation and large scale phenomena such as rock cleavage and rock folding caused by tectonic uplift and orogeny.

He studied the microscopical structure of meteorites.

In the summer of 1876 at South Kensington, he gave a lecture to science teachers on microscopes.

== Metallography ==
In 1863, he used etching with acid to study the microscopic structure of iron and steel. Using this technique, he was the first in England to understand that a small but precise quantity of carbon gave steel its strength. His metallographic observations allowed to scientifically confirm the merits and the soundness of the process patented by Henry Bessemer in 1855, and improved by Robert Forester Mushet in 1856, for mass-production of steel. Due to this accomplishment, Sorby is known to modern metallurgists as the "father of metallography", with an award bearing his name being offered by the International Metallographic Society for lifetime achievement.

== Marine sciences ==
His interests were broad. After buying a yacht, "The Glimpse", he also studied sedimentology and marine biology. Sorby examined ripples in sedimentary rocks and examined their orientations in different layers thus pioneering the study of paleocurrents. He also measured the temperature of the water in estuaries. He published essays on the construction and use of the micro-spectroscope in the study of matter colouring marine animals and vegetable. He also applied his skill in making preparations of marine invertebrate animals for lantern slides. Furthermore, he once estimated "one cubic thousandth of an inch of water to contain 3.7 × 10^{15} molecules."

== Scientific societies ==
In 1857, aged only 31, he was elected a Fellow of the Royal Society (FRS) in recognition of this work on slaty cleavage.

He was president of the Royal Microscopical Society. In 1882, he was elected president of Firth College, Sheffield after the death of founder Mark Firth. Sorby also worked hard for the establishment of the University of Sheffield, which was eventually founded in 1905. A university hall of residence, Sorby Hall, built in the 1960s and demolished in August 2006, was named after him.

== Death ==
He died in Sheffield and was buried in Ecclesall churchyard.

== Honours and awards ==
He was elected a Fellow of the Royal Society in June 1857 as one who was Author of various papers on Slaty Cleavage; on the peculiarities of stratification due to the action of currents & their application to the investigation of the Physical Geography of ancient periods; on the microscopical structure of limestones and other peculiarities of the physical & chemical constitution of rocks. Distinguished for his acquaintance with the science of Geology. He delivered their Bakerian Lecture in 1863 for his work on the Direct Correlation of mechanical and Chemical Forces and was awarded their Royal Medal in 1874. He was elected an honorary member of the Manchester Literary and Philosophical Society 1869. In 1892, Sorby was elected a Foreign Honorary Member of the American Academy of Arts and Sciences.

Both the International Association of Sedimentologists and the Yorkshire Geological Society have Sorby Medals named in honour of his achievements in geology. The Henry Clifton Sorby Award is offered by the International Metallographic Society in recognition of lifetime achievement in metallurgy. The University of Sheffield has a chair of geology/physical geology named after him and the Sorby Natural History Society is named after Sorby. The area in which the society operates (north East Derbyshire, the Sheffield and Chesterfield areas) are known to members as 'Sorbyshire'.

The Dorsa Sorby wrinkle ridge system on the Moon is named after him. There is also a wing at the Northern General Hospital in Sheffield (South Yorkshire) named after him.

== See also ==
- Cleavage (crystal)
- Cleavage (geology)
- Dynamic quartz recrystallization
- Petrology
- Physical crystallography before X-rays
- Pressure solution
- Salt deformation
- Structural geology
