= Mary Buckland =

British palaeontologist, marine biologist and scientific illustrator

- Born: 20 November 1797; Abingdon-on-Thames, Berkshire, England
- Died: 30 November 1857 (aged 60); Islip, Oxfordshire, England
- Spouse: William Buckland (m. 1825; died 1856)
- Scientific career
- Fields: Science, Paleontology, Marine Biology, Scientific Illustration

Mary Buckland (née Morland; 20 November 1797 – 30 November 1857) was an English palaeontologist, marine biologist and scientific illustrator.

== Early life and family ==
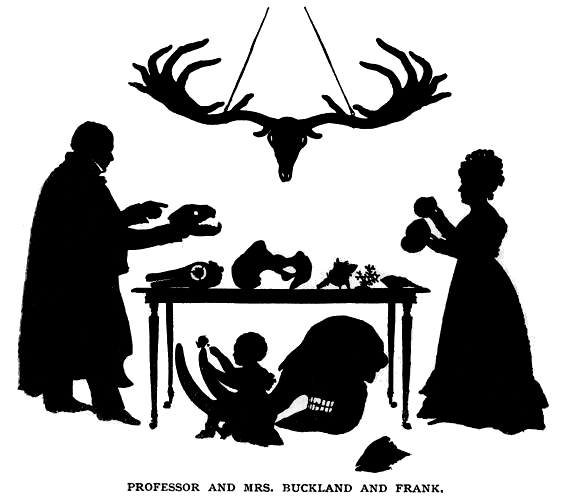
Buckland family silhouette

Mary Morland was born in 1797, the eldest child of Benjamin Morland (1768–1833), a successful solicitor with a practice in Abingdon-on-Thames, and his wife Harriet (née Baster). In 1799 Harriet died, following the birth and early death of the couple's second child, and in 1802 Benjamin married Elizabeth Thornhill. By 1812, when Benjamin bought Sheepstead House at Marcham near Abingdon, Mary had many half-brothers and sisters. Although at some stage she attended a boarding school in Southampton, Mary also spent much time during her childhood at the home of Sir Christopher and Lady Pegge in Oxford, where Pegge, the Regius Professor of Anatomy at the University, encouraged her scientific interests.

In the midst of her teenage years she was intrigued by the studies conducted by Georges Cuvier and provided him with specimens and illustrations. Buckland established a name for herself as a scientific draughtswoman, who helped Conybeare, Cuvier, and her soon to be husband, William Buckland.

== Marriage ==
According to Caroline Fox, Buckland met her husband the Reverend William Buckland in the following way:

Both were travelling in Dorsetshire and each were reading a new and weighty tome by the French naturalist Georges Cuvier. They got into conversation, the drift of which was so peculiar that Dr. Buckland exclaimed, "You must be Miss Morland, to whom I am about to deliver a letter of introduction." He was right, and she soon became Mrs Buckland.

On 31st December 1825 Mary married Buckland, the Reader in Mineralogy and Geology at the University of Oxford. Their marriage was made possible by Buckland's recent appointment to a lucrative canonry at Christ Church in Oxford. Later, in 1845, Buckland achieved further ecclesiastical preferment when he became Dean of Westminster. The couple's honeymoon was a geological tour lasting through much of 1826. It included visits to geologists and geological locations across Europe. They had nine children, including Frank Buckland and author Elizabeth Oke Buckland Gordon. The children were exposed to their parents' collections of fossils from an early age and at the age of 4, Frank could successfully identify the vertebrae of an ichthyosaurus. Buckland supported her husband's pursuits, while balancing her time to help educate, and teach her children. She also spent her time promoting education within the villages. During her marriage, her desire to pursue science was limited because of her husband's disproval of women being engaged in scientific pursuits.

Her eldest son Frank, said the following about his mother for her contribution to Buckland's work:

Not only was she a pious, amiable, and excellent helpmate to my father; but being naturally endowed with great mental powers, habits of perseverance and order, tempered by excellent judgement, she materially assisted her husband in his literary labours, and often gave to them a polish which added not a little to their merit … Not only with her pen did she render material assistance, but her natural talent in the use of her pencil enabled her to give accurate illustrations and finished drawings … She was also particularly clever and neat in mending broken fossils … It was her occupation also to label the specimens.

== Later life ==
In 1842 Mary's husband fell ill and his mental health began to decline. In 1850 he was sent to John Bush's Mental Asylum at Clapham in London. Shortly after, Mary retired to St Leonards-on-Sea in Sussex and continued to show an appreciation of her husband's studies. Mary died in St Leonards on 30 November 1857, and was buried in Islip, Oxfordshire Mary Buckland amassed a vast collection of fossils and other specimens and taught in a village school in Islip, near the family's country home.

== Career ==
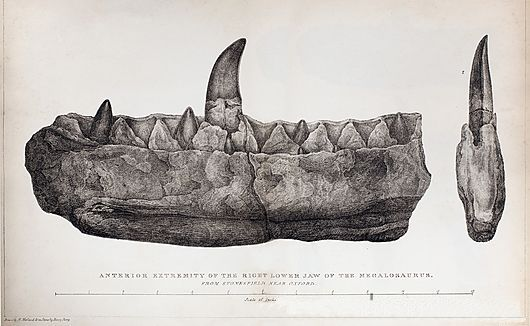
Anterior extremity of the right lower jaw of Megalosaurus drawn by Mary Buckland

Mary Buckland started her career as a teenager producing illustrations and providing specimens for George Cuvier, widely regarded as the founder of paleontology, as well as for the British geologist William Conybeare. She made models of fossils, and labelled fossils for the Oxford University Museum of Natural History, studied marine zoophytes and repaired broken fossils inline with her husband's instructions.

Mary Buckland assisted her husband greatly by writing as he dictated, editing, producing elaborate illustrations for his books, taking notes of his observations, and writing much of it herself. Her skills as an artist are on display in Mr. Buckland's largely illustrated work Reliquiae diluvianae, published in 1823, and in his Geology and Mineralogy in 1836. Her son noted that she was particularly "neat and clever in mending fossils" with specially developed cementing, and in assisting William Buckland's experiments to reproduce fossil tracks and many others. She assisted him when he was commissioned to contribute a volume to The Bridgewater Treatises.

Although Mary Buckland was in poor health after her husband's death, she continued her husband's work and branched out her own research. Examining micro forms of marine life through a microscope, with her daughter Caroline, and arranging a large collection of zoophytes and sponges, which she collected during her visits to the Channel islands of Guernsey and Sark with her husband. Much of her fossil reconstructions are held by the Oxford University Museum of Natural History.
