= Francis Trevelyan Buckland =

English surgeon, naturalist, palaeontologist and pioneer of zoöphagy

Frank Buckland
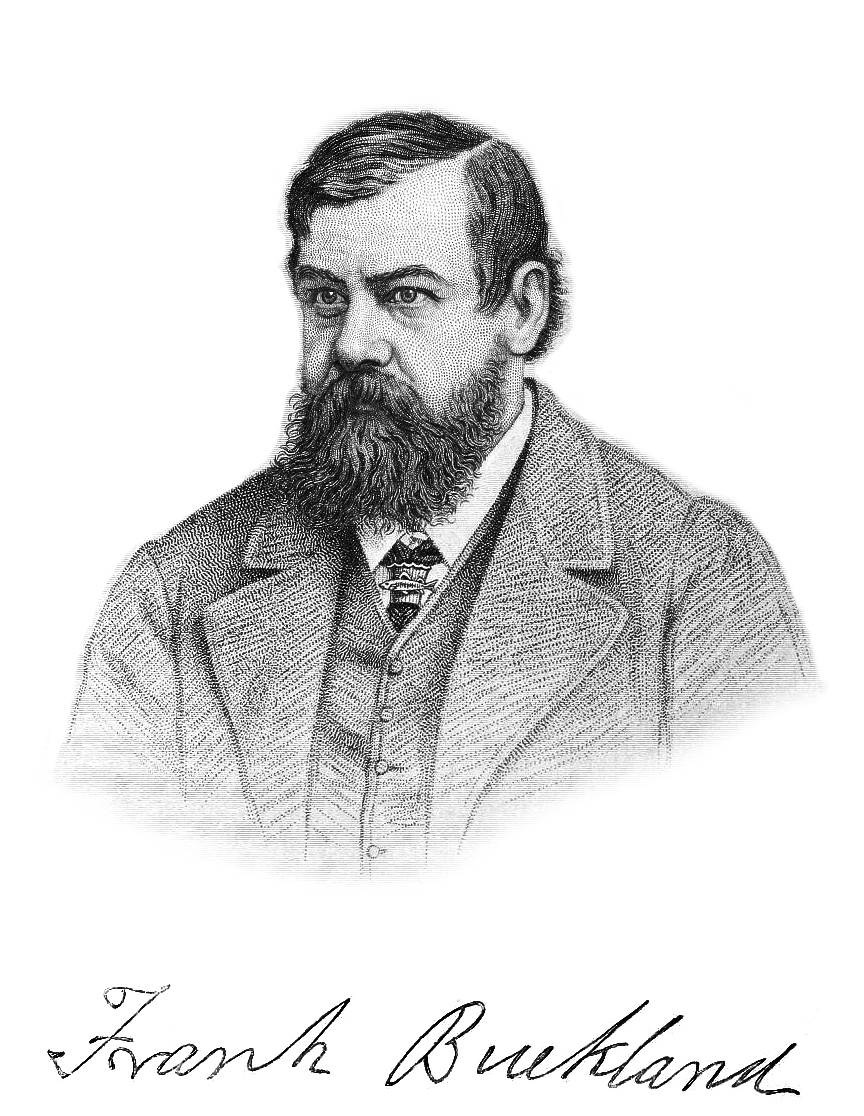
- Born: 17 December 1826; Oxford, England
- Died: 19 December 1880 (aged 54)
- Occupations: naturalist, surgeon, popular writer

Francis Trevelyan Buckland (17 December 1826 – 19 December 1880), better known as Frank Buckland, was an English surgeon, zoologist, popular author and natural historian. He was born in a noted family of naturalists. After a brief career in medicine he took an interest in fishes and other matters. He was one of the key members and founders of the acclimatisation society in Britain, an organisation that supported the introduction of new plants and animals as food sources which was influenced by his interest in eating and tasting a range of exotic animal meats, a practice which he adopted from his father.

== Life and career ==
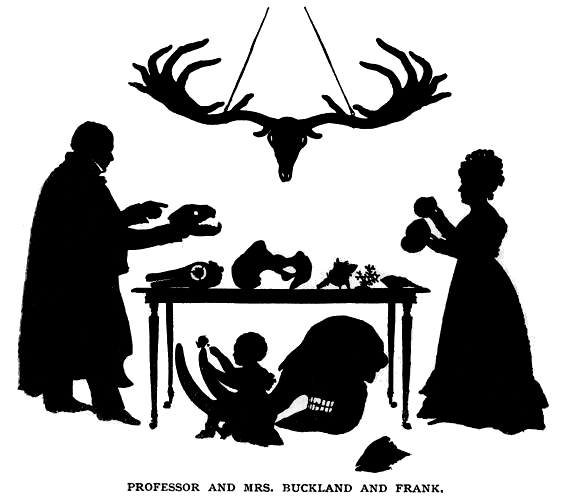
Buckland family silhouette with Frank under the table

Frank was the first son of Canon William Buckland, a noted geologist and palaeontologist, and Mary, a fossil collector, palaeontologist and illustrator. Frank was born and brought up in Oxford, where his father was a Canon of Christ Church. His godfather was the sculptor Sir Francis Chantrey. Educated at home by his mother, he went, at eight and a half, to a boarding school in Cotterstock, Northamptonshire staying with his uncle John Buckland. From 1837 to 1839, he went to a preparatory school in Laleham, Surrey, run by his uncle, John Buckland, a brutal headmaster who flogged his pupils quite excessively. Relief came with a scholarship to Winchester College, a school with an unbroken history of six hundred years. Here he was taught by the Second Master, Charles Wordsworth, who sent letters of praise to his father. Winchester had a harsh regime, but was much preferable to his previous school. While at Winchester he continued to take an interest in animals, trapping rats and mice, dissecting and sometimes eating them. Students complained of a foul smell emanating from the remains of a cat under his bed. Towards the end of his schooling, he was dissecting human parts that he obtained from the hospital on the sly. He was known for his exploits with a lancet. One student with a dolichocephalous head heard Frank muttering "what wouldn't I give for that fellow's skull!" He was not a first-rate scholar, but managed to gain entrance to Christ Church, Oxford in October 1844, after failing to get a scholarship to the smaller Corpus Christi. He joined a debating club and the first essay he read was on "whether Rooks are beneficial to the farmer or not". He became a friend of the curator at Surrey Zoo and when he heard that a panther had died, he had it dug up and declared that the meat "was not very good". When the British Association met in 1847 at Oxford, Frank took along his pet bear Tigleth Pileser dressed in student attire of a cap and gown to the party. Charles Lyell wrote that Buckland introduced the bear formally to him and other zoologists present. This was not to go on for long as the Dean finally informed him that "either you or your bear must go". In 1845 Frank went to Giessen for three months to study chemistry under Justus von Liebig. In September 1846 he made a trip around Switzerland. Frank also attended some of the lectures of his father.

Buckland studied at Christ Church from 1844 to 1848, graduating at the second attempt. Passing out in May 1848 and at the advice of Richard Owen and Sir Benjamin Brodie, his father sent him to study surgery in London at St George's Hospital under Caesar Hawkins. He attended classes by Henry Gray where another classmate was Francis Day. During this time he also became acquainted with Abraham Dee Bartlett who would send him dead animals at the zoo and he continued to keep many animals. A visit to Paris in 1849 gave him a chance of comparing their methods with those in London. In London most of the nurses were illiterate; one who claimed to read was tested with a label reading "This lotion to be applied externally only". The nurse interpreted it as "Two spoonfuls to be taken four times a day".

Buckland was made a MRCS in 1851. He was appointed Assistant Surgeon (= house-surgeon) at St George's, 1852. A vivid word-portrait was written by a surgical colleague, Charles Lloyd:

Four and a half feet in height and rather more in breadth—what he measured round the chest is not known to mortal man. His chief passion was surgery—elderly maidens called their cats indoors as he passed by and young mothers who lived in the neighbourhood gave their nurses more than ordinarily strict injunctions as to their babies. To a lover of natural history it was a pleasant sight to see him at dinner with a chicken before him... and see how, undeterred by foolish prejudices, he devoured the brain.^{p59}

He left St. George's in 1853 and in August 1854 he joined as an assistant surgeon in the 2nd Life Guards. This appointment that left him plenty of time for his growing interest in natural history, since the Household Cavalry were not deployed abroad from the Battle of Waterloo (1815) until the Battle of Tel el-Kebir in 1882. Buckland held the appointment until 1863. During this period he published numerous notes in The Field, began giving talks and writing books.

Frank was elected to the Athenaeum Club in February 1854, and later that year was gazetted as Assistant Surgeon to the Second Life Guards. In January and February 1859, Buckland made a search for the coffin of John Hunter in the vaults of St Martin-in-the-Fields. Buckland called Hunter the "greatest of Englishmen" and on 22 February he discovered the coffin after withstanding the noxious air in the vault. The Leeds School of Medicine gave him a medal for this discovery.

Buckland married Hannah Papps on 11 August 1863, who was an "excellent nurse" and caretaker for their assorted pets.

Buckland's early death was presaged by lung haemorrhages in 1879 after working in the winter. In 1880 he had severe oedema. The excess fluid was drained using a novel treatment of the time, a cannula called Southey's tube developed by the surgeon Dr Henry Herbert Southey whose brother, the poet Robert Southey, was a friend of Buckland. He also had asthma and bronchitis from a history of heavy cigar smoking. His brother-in-law George C. Bompas was present at the time of his death. The death certificate records the cause as hepatic disease and bronchitis although the cause may have been pulmonary tuberculosis. He was buried in Brompton Cemetery, London.

=== Natural history and zoöphagy ===
Buckland gradually gave up medicine and surgery to devote himself to natural history. He made a good income as a writer for The Field and other periodicals, and from the sale of popular books. He was much in demand as a lecturer and speaker.

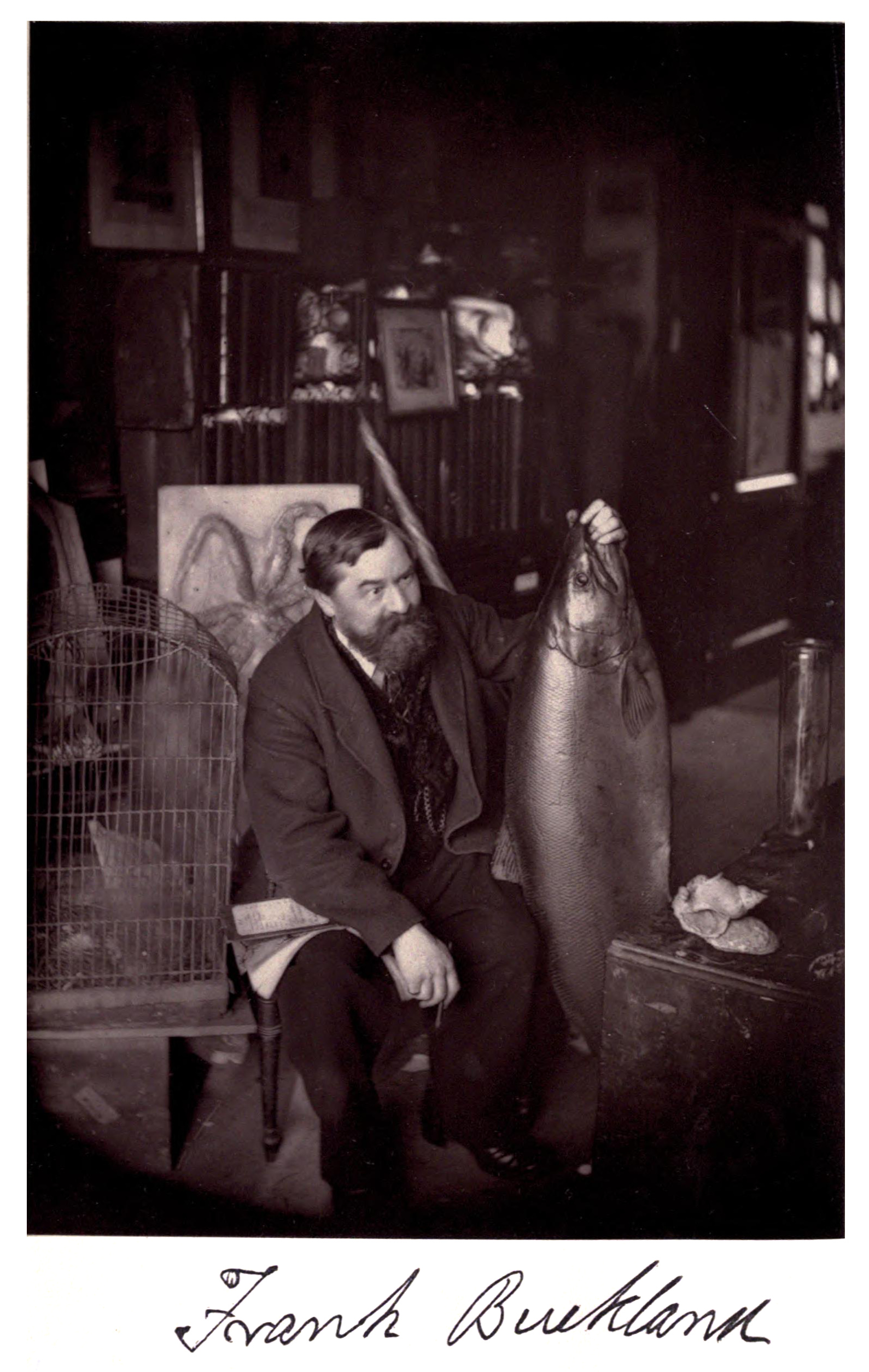
Buckland in later life

Buckland was a pioneer of zoöphagy: his favourite research was eating the animal kingdom. This habit he learnt from his father, whose residence, the Deanery, offered such rare delights as mice in batter, squirrel pie, horse's tongue and ostrich. After the "Eland Dinner" in 1859 at the London Tavern, organised by Richard Owen, Buckland set up the Acclimatization Society to further the search for new food. Buckland spoke about the introduction of the turkey, musk-duck and pheasant in the sixteenth, seventeenth and eighteenth century respectively and that it was a pity that the same monotonous food was being eaten in the heyday of Queen Victoria's reign. In 1862 a hundred guests at Willis' Rooms sampled Japanese sea slug (= sea cucumber, probably), kangaroo, guan, curassow and Honduras turkey. This was really quite a modest menu, though Buckland had his eye on capybara for the future. Buckland's home, 37 Albany Street, London, was famous for its menagerie and its varied menus, including, at times, boiled elephant trunk, rhinoceros pie, porpoise heads, and stewed mole.

His writing was sometimes slapdash, but always vivid and racy, and made natural history attractive to the mass readership. This is an example:

"On Tuesday evening, at 5pm, Messrs Grove, of Bond Street, sent word that they had a very fine sturgeon on their slab. Of course, I went down at once to see it... The fish measured 9 feet in length [nearly three metres]. I wanted to make a cast of the fellow... and they offered me the fish for the night: he must be back in the shop the next morning by 10 am... [various adventures follow] I was determined to get him into the kitchen somehow; so, tying a rope to his tail, I let him slide down the stone stairs by his own weight. He started all right, but 'getting way' on him, I could hold the rope no more, and away he went sliding headlong down the stairs, like an avalanche down Mont Blanc... he smashed the door open... and slid right into the kitchen... till at last he brought himself to an anchor under the kitchen table. This sudden and unexpected appearance of the armour-clad sea monster, bursting open the door... instantly created a sensation. The cook screamed, the house-maid fainted, the cat jumped on the dresser, the dog retreated behind the copper and barked, the monkeys went mad with fright, and the sedate parrot has never spoken a word since."

An enthusiastic lover of natural history, he became a popular author, writing Fish Hatching (1863), Curiosities of Natural History (4 vols. 1857–72), Log Book of a Fisherman and Zoologist (1876) and Natural History of British Fishes (1881). When he fell out with The Field's editor, he founded and edited a rival periodical, Land and Water, in 1866. He became Inspector of Salmon Fisheries in 1867, and retained this post for the rest of his life. In this role he was extremely energetic, and made good use of his talent for publicity. He served on various commissions, experimented with fish hatcheries, and developed the Museum of Economic Fish Culture.

Though observant, he was not always strictly scientific in his methods and modes of expression. Charles Darwin used some of Buckland's writings from Land and Water in the Descent of Man, an honour which Buckland did not appreciate, since he was a strong opponent of Darwinism. But Buckland was no theoretician: his life was lived on the practical side of natural history.

=== Buckland and fisheries ===
The Buckland Foundation is a charity endowed from Buckland's estate. It funds a Buckland Professor each year to give public talks in relevant parts of the United Kingdom and Ireland on a matter of current concern in the commercial fisheries. Buckland sat on four Commissions at Fish and Fishing between 1875 and his death in 1880. Something of the flavour of his views is given by the following quotations from his reports and articles:

"A greater cry should more properly be established against those which deter or kill the fish by noxious materials which they pour into public waters for their private use and benefit...".

"What objection can be reasonably argued against the employment of revenue cruisers for the accommodation of naturalists, appointed by government ... in order that they make a thoroughly practical examination of the dark and mysterious habits of food fishes."

"We want also samples of the surface water itself under peculiar conditions, for instance, what is the meaning of the wonderful white appearance of the sea which took place last autumn in nearly all the waters of the northern coast of England? What is the meaning of the occasional red appearance of the sea for many square miles? Again, how are we to devise a mesh of net that shall let go the small soles and undersized fry of other sea fish, and keep marketable fish only?"

Buckland founded the Museum of Economic Fish Culture in South Kensington in 1865, the remaining contents of which are held by the Scottish Fisheries Museum in Anstruther. These include 45 plaster casts and an 1882 marble bust of Buckland by J. Warrington Wood.

== Legacy ==
The Buckland Club, named in his honour, meets for dinner twice a year in Birmingham, England. It was established by Sir Arthur Thomson, head of the Birmingham University Medical School, in 1952.

== Publications ==
Books and reports published by Buckland include:

- Buckland, Frank T. (1857). Curiosities of Natural History. 1 ed. Richard Bentley, New Burlington Street, London.
- Buckland, Frank T. (1863). Fish hatching. London: Tinsley Brothers.
- Buckland, Frank T. (1868). Curiosities of natural history. Vol. 1 (2 ed.). London: Richard Bentley.
- Buckland, Frank T. (1868). Curiosities of natural history. Vol. 2 (2 ed.). Richard Bentley.
- Buckland, Frank T. (1875). Log-book of a fisherman and zoologist. Chapman & Hall.
- Buckland, Frank T.; Walpole, Spencer; Young, Archibald (1880). Report on the disease which has recently prevailed among the salmon in the Tweed, Eden, and other rivers in England and Scotland.
- Buckland, Frank T. (1886). Notes and jottings from animal life (2 ed.). Smith, Elder and Co.
