= Dorsum Buckland =

Wrinkle ridge on the Moon

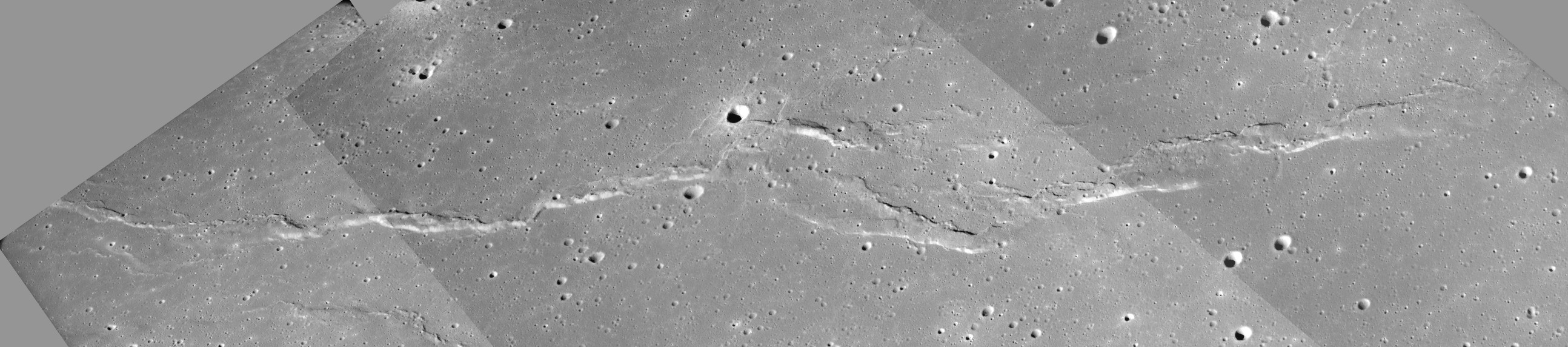
Mosaic of Apollo 15 panoramic camera images showing part of Dorsum Buckland, facing south

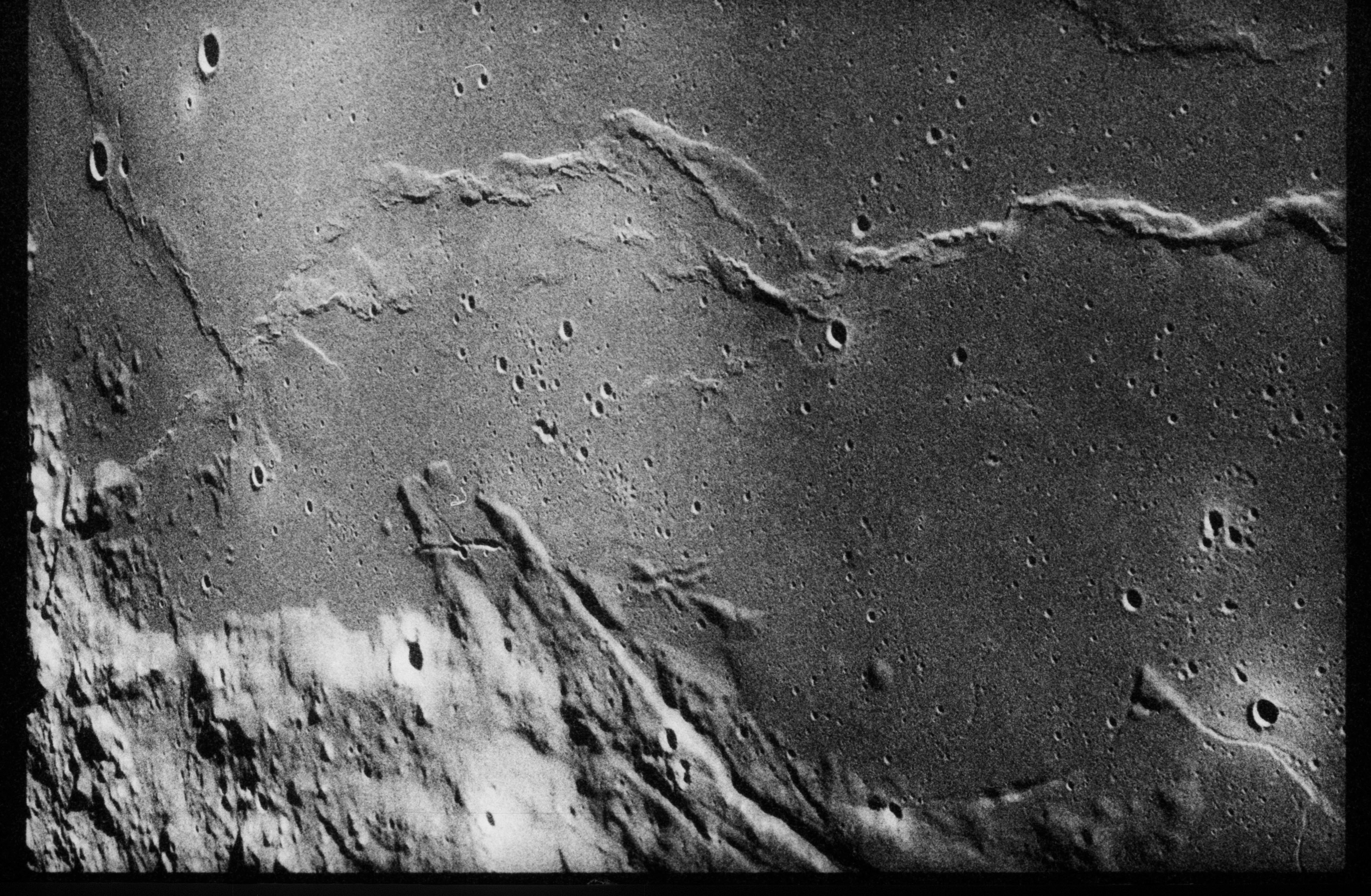
Apollo 17 image

Dorsum Buckland is a large wrinkle ridge at 20.4°N 12.8°E in Mare Serenitatis on the Moon, 369 km long. It was named after British geologist William Buckland in 1976.

Dorsum Buckland's ridges are 200 to 300 meters high and were formed by compressional stresses near the center of the basin, possibly over buried basin structures.
