= Horse tongue =

Anatomy of the equine tongue

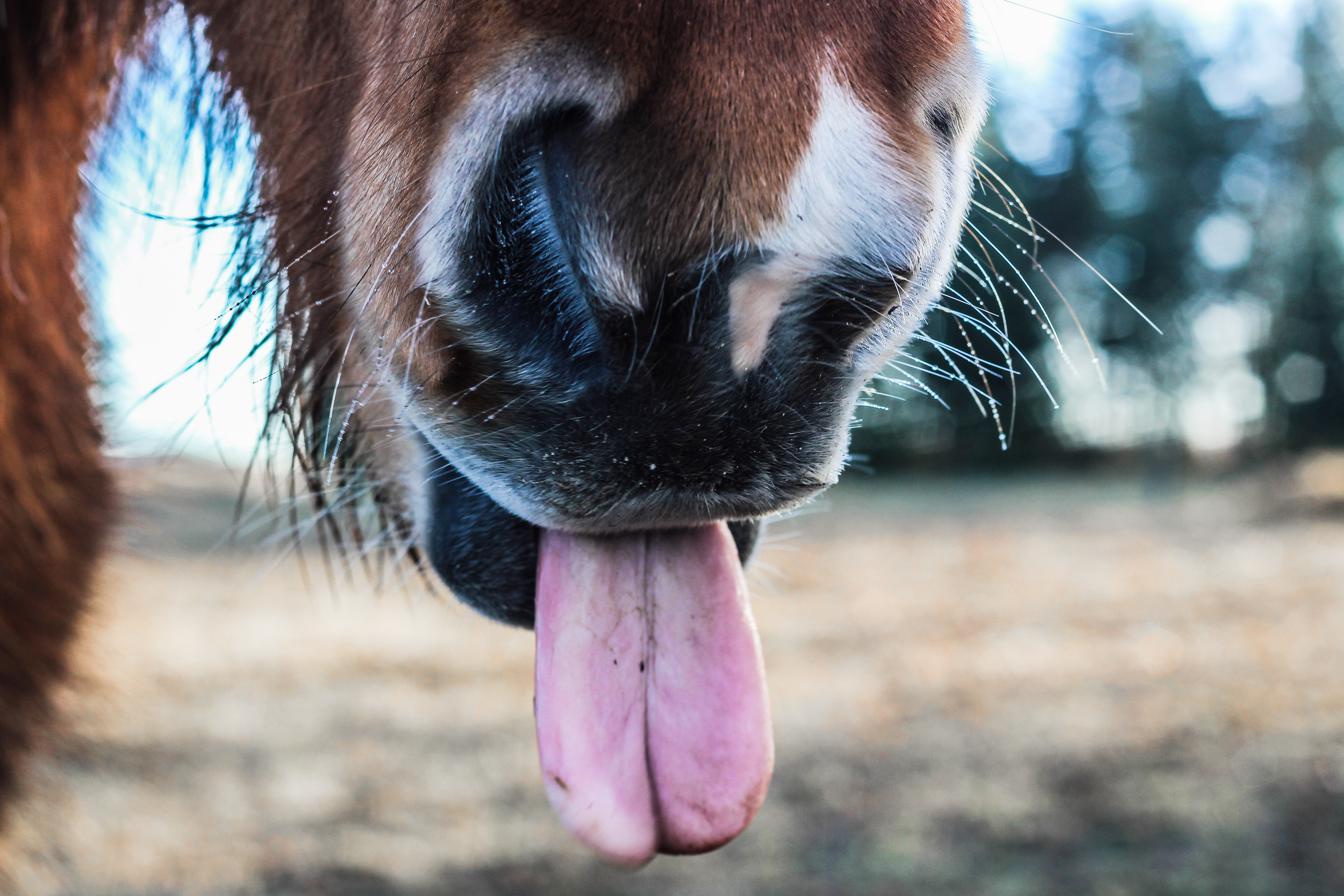
Horse sticking out its tongue

The horse tongue is an organ that is part of the equine digestive system. Similar to that of most mammals, it is pink and plays a significant role in taste perception. Its long, narrow shape, characteristic of herbivorous animals, allows the horse to grasp food effectively with the assistance of its lips and teeth. The tongue is sensitive to pressure and temperature and is involved in activities such as licking and chewing. While a mare licks her foal extensively immediately after birth, there is limited research on the gustatory sensitivity of horses and the social functions of their tongues.

Equestrianism involves potential contact between the horse's tongue and a bit, necessitating precautions to prevent injury to this sensitive, highly vascularized organ. Compression from inappropriate bitting can cause the horse's tongue to turn white or blue, which may adversely affect the animal's overall health. The practice of tying down the tongues of racehorses is a topic of ongoing debate.

== Anatomy ==
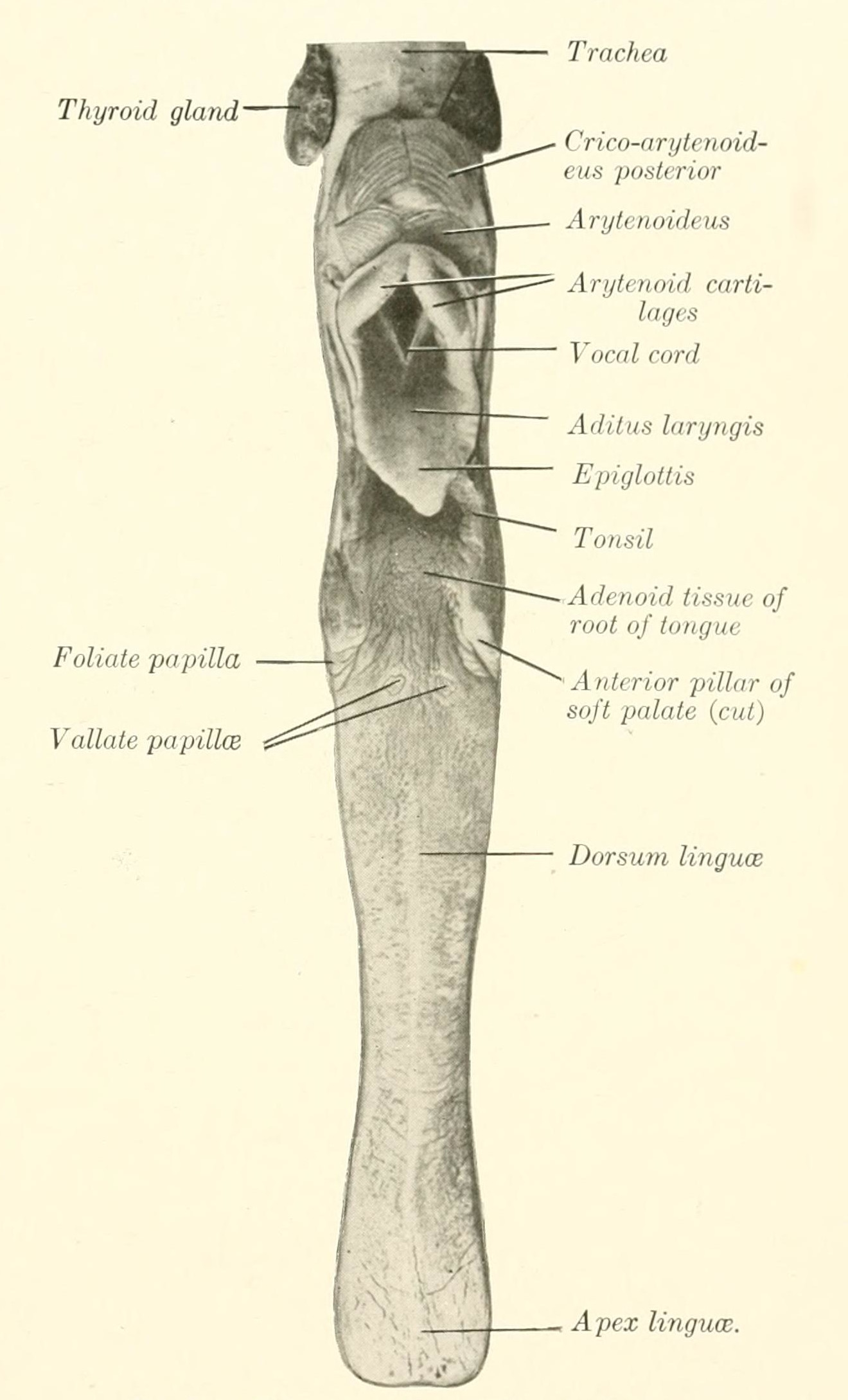
Horse tongue anatomy

The horse possesses a long, narrow tongue that typically measures approximately 40 cm in length and 9.3 to 10.7 cm in width, with an average weight of around 1.2 kg. The tongue is composed of over a dozen muscles and is connected to surrounding tissues by a membrane known as the frenulum, facilitating effective chewing. It is also richly supplied with blood vessels.

Structurally, the horse's tongue is thick and features a robust outer layer. The upper section, referred to as the dorsal lingual cartilage, contains muscle cells and adipose tissue, while the ventral surface is covered by a thinner layer. The arrangement of muscle fibers in the tongue allows for a variety of movements.

Notably, the Caspian horse differs from other studied horse breeds in that it lacks hyaline cartilage in its tongue.

=== Taste buds ===
The horse's tongue features taste buds primarily located on the upper two-thirds of its surface. While these taste buds are present, the majority serve mechanical or tactile functions rather than gustatory ones. Filiform taste buds, characterized by their short and thin, finger-like shape, are found on the dorsal and lateral surfaces of the tongue but are absent on the ventral surface. These projections are equipped with fine keratinized threads that curve backward.

Interspersed among the filiform taste buds are fungiform taste buds, which are fewer in number and covered by a keratinized layer. Additionally, two large circumvallate taste buds are situated at the back of the tongue, near its root, while foliate taste buds are located near the palatoglossus muscle.

Research conducted in 2000 by C. J. Pfeiffer, M. Levin, and M. A. F. Lopes identified localized groups of epidermal cells within the horse's tongue, notable for their high content of specific cytoplasmic granules, which may contribute to structural strength in relation to mechanical taste buds.

Comparative anatomical studies indicate that the fine structure of the tongue in horses exhibits a more primitive pattern than that observed in goats and cattle. Specifically, horse filiform taste buds are long and thin, whereas those in goats and cattle are thicker. Additionally, horses possess two large circumvallate taste buds, while goats and cattle have 15 or more situated in the posterior region of the tongue.

=== Glands ===
Groups of minor salivary glands are present between the muscle fibers and the lamina propria. Most lingual glands are mucous and most gustatory glands are serous.

== Physiology ==
The mechanical functions of the horse's tongue are moderate, influenced by its prehensile nature. The anterior portion of the tongue works in conjunction with the incisors and lips to grasp vegetation. Additionally, the tongue assists in maneuvering food toward the molars for effective chewing. Horses can also partially clean their teeth using their tongues, dislodging food particles that may become stuck. The horse's tongue is sensitive to pressure, pain, and temperature, further contributing to its functional capabilities.

=== Taste perception ===
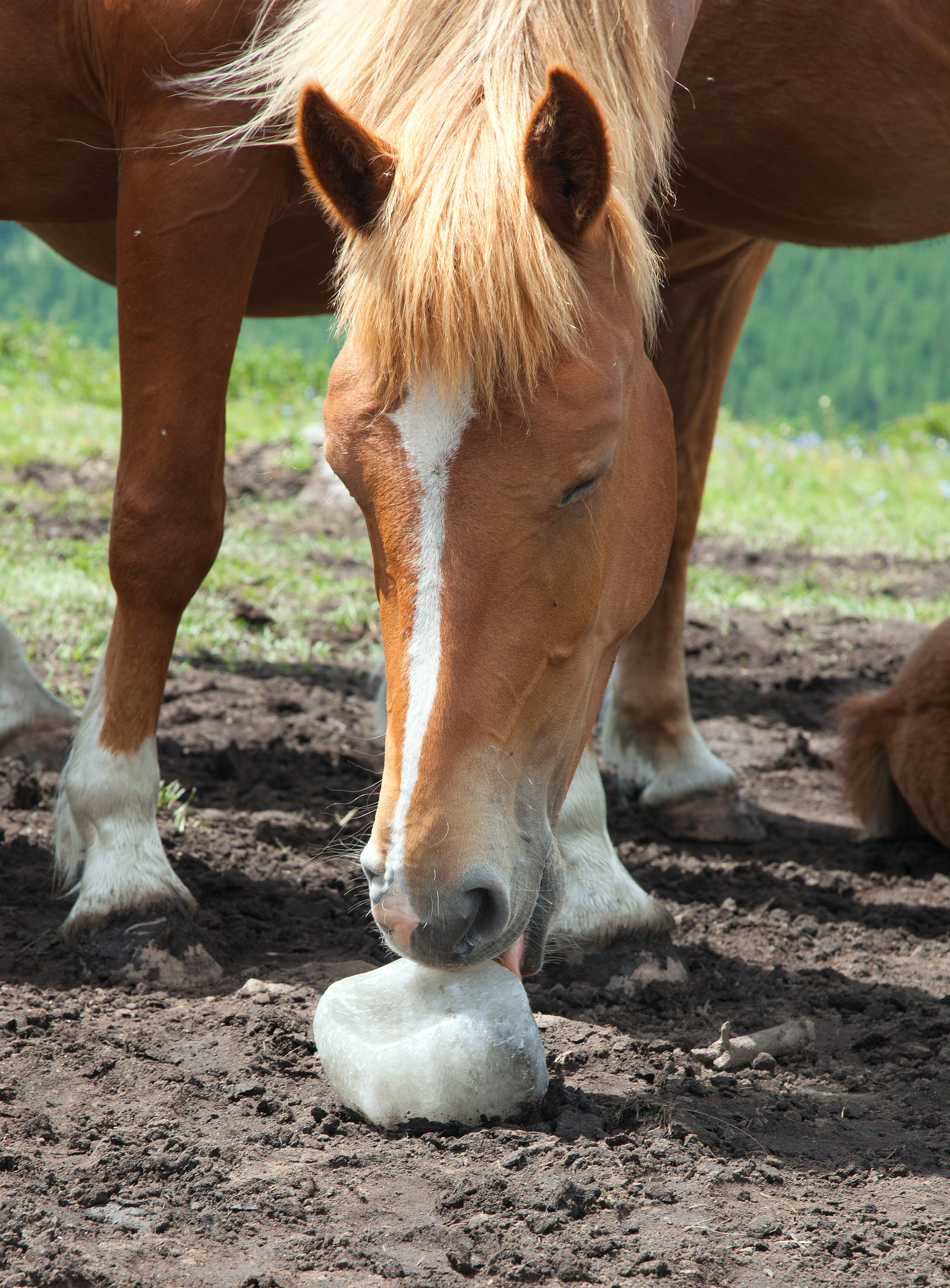
A horse licking a salt stone

The tongue allows horses to experience the sense of taste. Similar to all mammals, this sense is closely linked to olfaction

Horses are reputed to possess a highly sensitive sense of taste, although research on this topic is limited. It has been established that the presence of taste buds allows horses to sense the flavors of substances they touch with their tongues. Like many mammals, horses respond to bitter, salty, sweet, acidic, and umami tastes, as well as to their concentrations, which can trigger specific gustatory reactions. There is no evidence to suggest that sensitivity to these tastes is localized to specific areas of the tongue. Consequently, horses can taste various foods and may spit out those that are unpalatable.

Sensitivity to flavors is crucial for horses to meet their nutritional needs. Horses are particularly sensitive to sweet tastes, especially soluble carbohydrates, which provide essential energy for their brains. They also exhibit a strong sensitivity to salty tastes, likely due to their need to replenish sodium reserves, with evidence indicating that horses may actively seek out salty foods in cases of deficiency. According to Leblanc, horses tend to avoid highly acidic substances to protect their teeth and show aversion to strong bitterness, helping them avoid potentially toxic plants. However, there is considerable variation in taste sensitivities among individual horses. Research by Ronald Randa and colleagues tested foals for sensitivity to four basic flavors and found no consistent trends in sensitivity or preference across these flavors. Generally, horses exhibit selective dietary preferences influenced by individual tastes. Additionally, it is possible to induce aversions to toxic foods in horses through taste association. Horses that experience negative biological effects after consuming a particular food may develop an aversion to that specific flavor.

=== Tongue usages ===
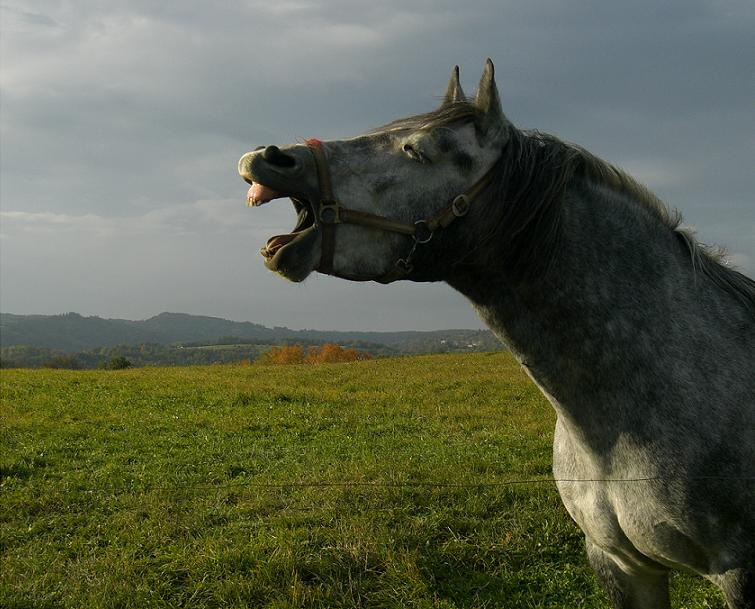
Yawning

According to ethologists Gerry and Julia Karen Neugebauer, horses utilize their tongues for various behaviors, including licking, chewing, submissive gestures, yawning, and drinking. Unlike cattle, horses typically do not use their tongues for mutual grooming. During close exploration, horses investigate new objects by sniffing them; if the scent is appealing, they may use their lips, whiskers, teeth, and tongue to touch and taste the object.

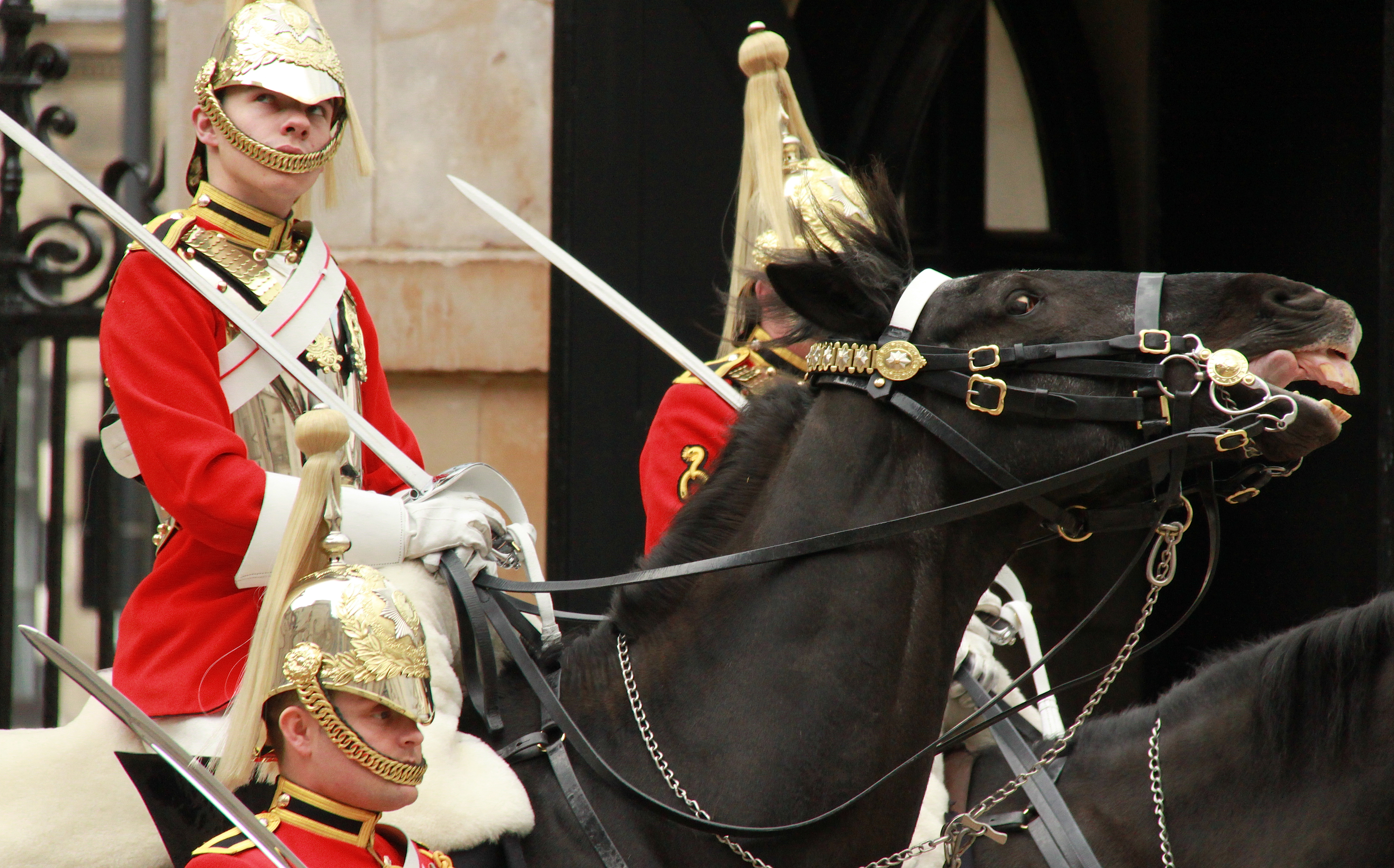
A horse sticks its tongue out to the side in discomfort

When a horse extends its tongue to the side, this behavior typically indicates discomfort of varying degrees. Additionally, if a horse opens its mouth, it may roll or protrude its tongue.

==== Licking ====
Licking is a common behavior among horses, both in the wild and in captivity. Its primary function is to facilitate the absorption of minerals. For example, horses that groom each other may lick one another to absorb water that has settled on their coats. If a horse licks a human, this behavior may indicate an expectation of food or a deficiency in mineral salts.

Systematic licking of objects in the horse's environment, such as stable walls, feed troughs, or metal bars, may occur before or after feeding. According to the Neugebauers, this behavior may signal a lack of food or stimulation and can develop into a behavioral disorder. Systematic licking is indicative of a stereotypy, or stable vice, and differs from normal licking in its repetitive nature, making it difficult to eradicate.

In addition to the sense of smell, taste may play a role in the bond between a foal and its mother, as suggested by Belgian researcher Franck Ödberg. Immediately after birth, the mare licks her foal extensively, providing her with a gustatory experience of the foal's coat, which appears to strengthen their bond. During the breeding season, stallions may lick a mare's urine.

==== Chewing ====
Chewing in horses is a combination of licking and mastication, during which the mouth is open and the tongue is visible, leading to saliva secretion. This behavior can serve multiple purposes and convey various meanings, including submission, relaxation, well-being, or discomfort. In their natural state, horses often chew while waiting for their turn to drink, when standing and expressing relaxation after a rest, or as a way to soothe themselves and display submission to another horse. When relaxed, a horse may engage in light chewing movements.

In domestic settings, interpreting this behavior can be challenging due to its varied implications. For example, a horse may chew when a rider approaches, when it receives contradictory signals, or when it experiences discomfort related to its riding equipment. Additionally, a horse might chew following a positive learning experience, exhibiting a closed mouth and squinted eyes.

==== Snapping ====
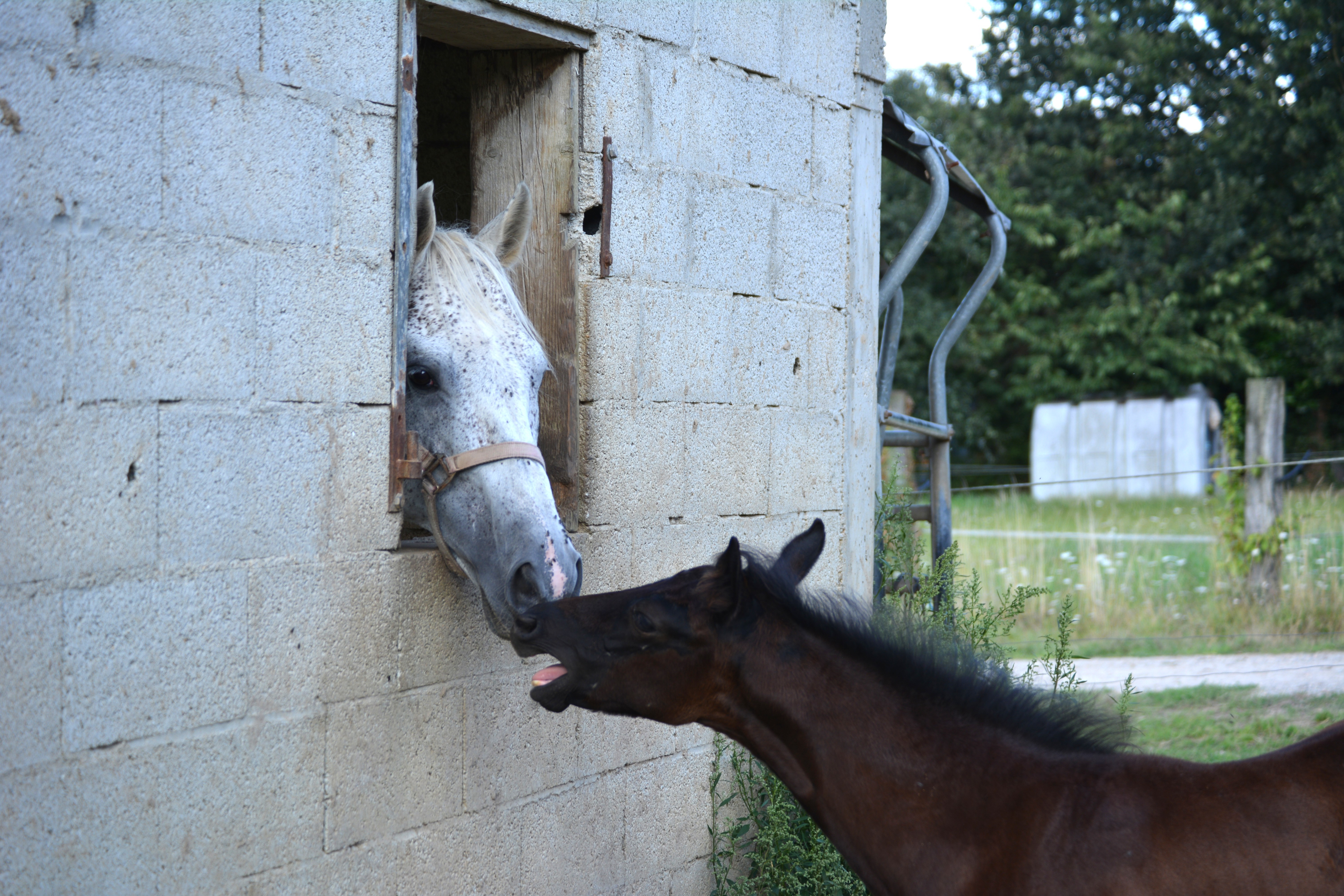
Snapping behavior

External video
- Demonstration of a foal clacking

Snapping or clacking is a submissive signal in which a horse snaps its jaws and shows its tongue, accompanied by slight chewing movements. This behavior is often exhibited by foals and young horses towards adult horses. The posture of the young horse resembles that of suckling, producing sucking noises in rhythm with the clicking of its tongue against the roof of its mouth. Ethologists Gerry and Julia Karen Neugebauer interpret this behavior as a form of self-soothing and an invitation to play.

This behavior is typically not present in adult horses that have been raised among their peers. However, it can persist in domestic horses that have not fully learned the social behaviors typical of their species and may be directed toward humans.

== Diseases and tics ==
The horse tongue can be affected by various illnesses and can be mobilized during tics or stereotypies.

=== Tics ===
Certain tongue-related behaviors in horses may lack specific functions and resemble tics or stereotypies, indicating unsuitable living conditions and a need for care. One such tic involves the horse extending its tongue out of its mouth and twirling it while displaying a detached facial expression, suggesting a lack of stimulation in its environment. Another tic involves tongue-pulling or hanging, which can occur with or without a bit in the mouth and may indicate the presence of heavy-handed riding. These tics can also manifest in horses with a bit, often leading to a significant commercial devaluation of the animal. However, the presence of tics with a bit does not inherently indicate a physical health problem, such as an injury.

In a study of 52 horses exhibiting tics, five were found to display lip and/or tongue stereotypies.

=== Diseases affecting the tongue ===
Infections of the horse's tongue can occur, such as one caused by the bacterium Actinobacillus lignieresii, which most commonly affects cattle, as reported in 1984.

The tongue can also develop tumors, with rare cases of vascular hamartoma, typically benign growths. A case of rhabdomyosarcoma, on the tongue of a five-year-old Quarter Horse mare, was studied in 1993. In 2014, the first case of adenocarcinoma, a malignant tumor that affected a third of the dorsal part of the tongue of an elderly horse, was cited in the scientific literature.

In one case, a five-year-old mare was examined for a soft mass on the dorsal left side of the tongue. Subsequently, numerous similar, coalescing masses developed along this area, extending to the tip of the tongue. The nature of this proliferation of perineal cells remains uncertain regarding its neoplastic characteristics.

== Human intervention in the horse tongue ==
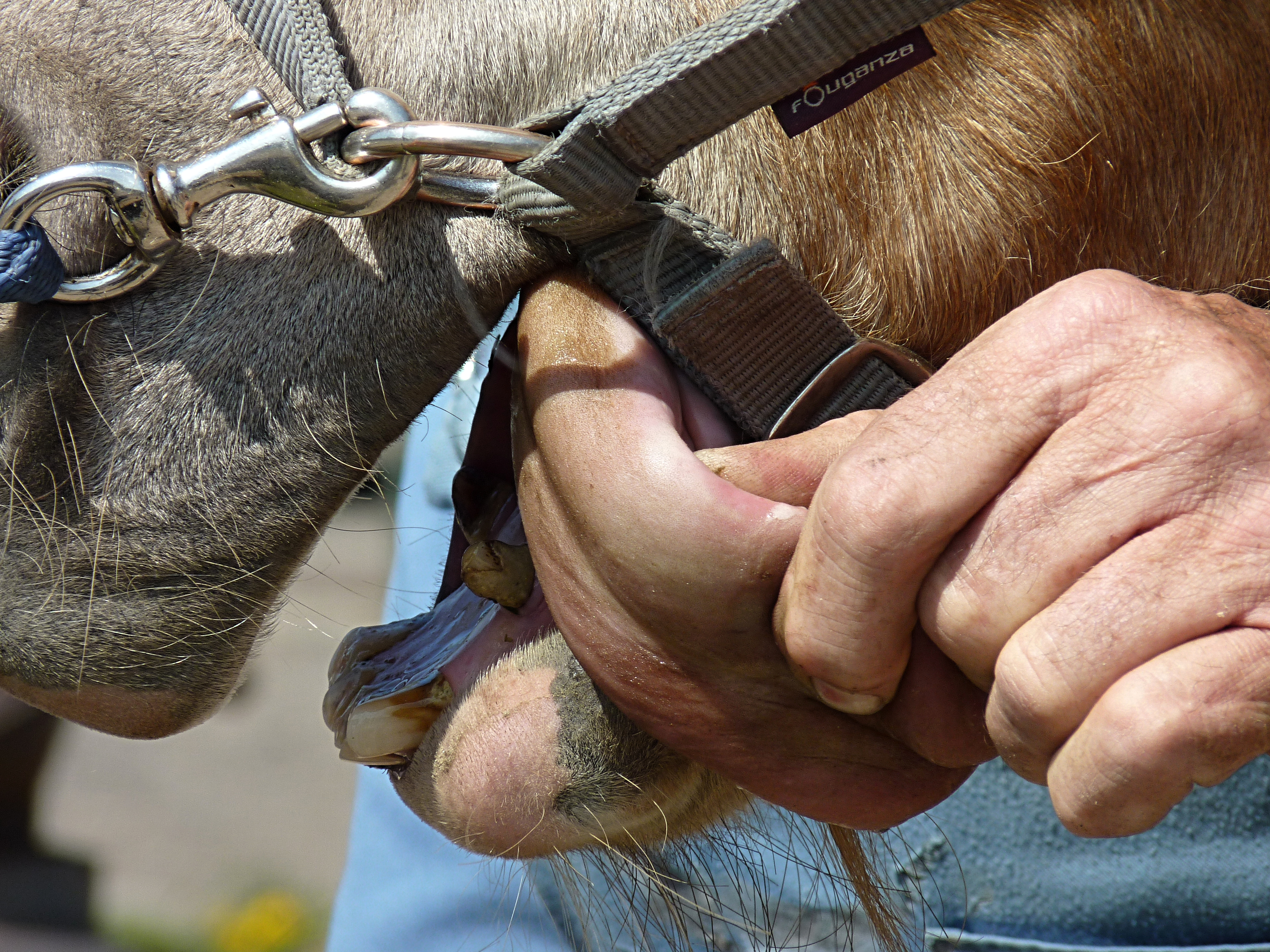
A horse tongue extended and held by a human hand.

Grabbing a horse's tongue is a commonly recognized method for immobilizing the animal; however, care must be taken to avoid rough handling. Some authors suggest that stretching the tongue to the side can help desensitize it, while others caution against this practice due to the sensory issues it may cause.

The horse tongue is highly sensitive, and therefore vulnerable to injury. The main cause of lingual injuries in horses is from mishandling or accidents related to a bit. A horse's tongue may hang over the bit for various reasons, particularly if the rider's hand is too heavy or if the bit is ill-suited to the horse's mouth, leading to a lack of control. In such cases, the horse may allow its tongue to hang out to the side. This behavior is to be distinguished from tongue stereotypies, as its origin is not the same. To mitigate this issue, "snaffle" bits and anti-tongue breakers can be added to the mouthpiece.

=== Tongue injuries and compressions caused by biting ===
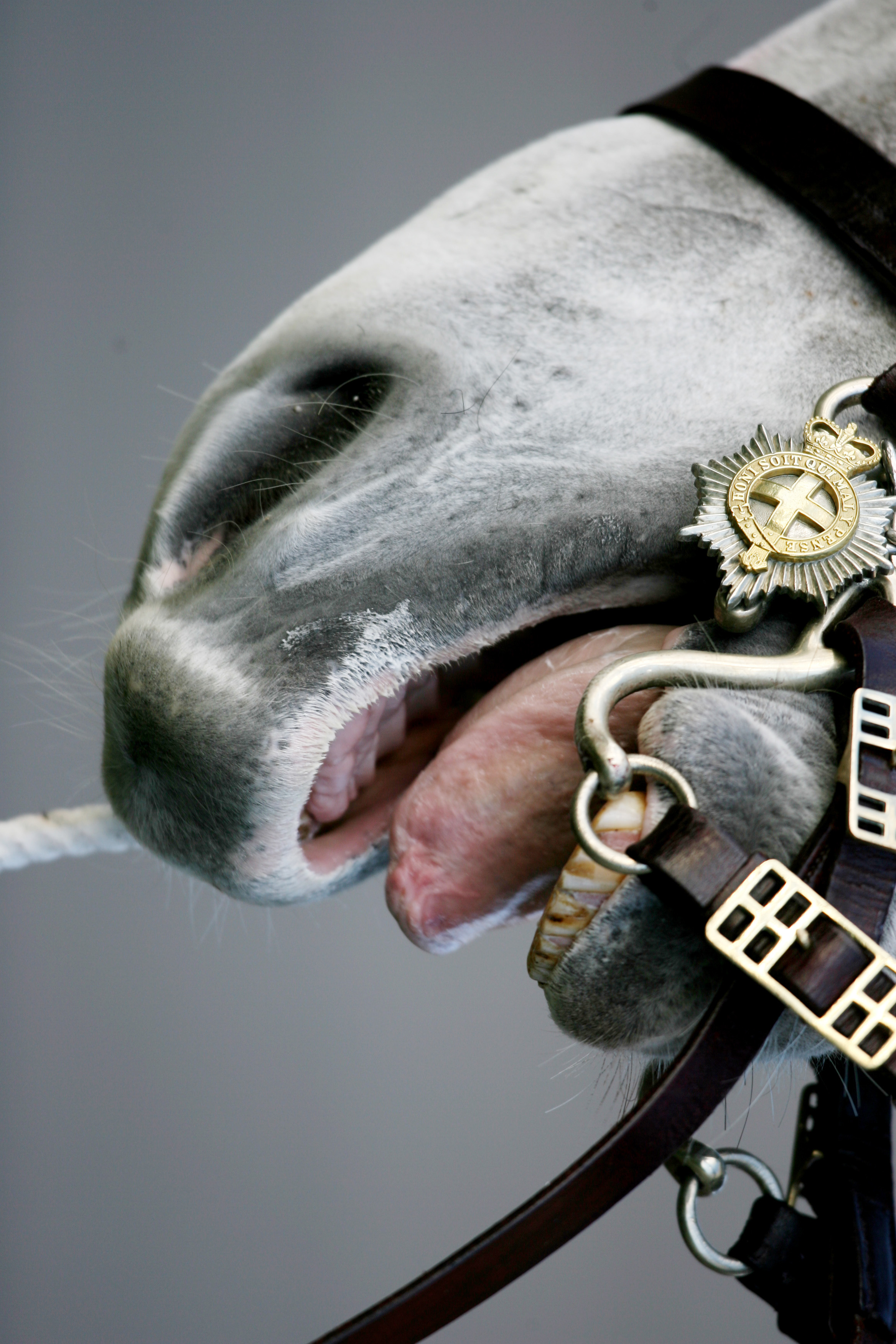
Horse showing severe discomfort with this bit

The main cause of tongue injuries in horses is the use of the bit during riding, whether due to the actions of the rider's hands or to unsuitable equipment. A minority of tongue injuries can result from contact with sharp molars, necessitating intervention by an equine dentist.

When the vascularity of a horse's tongue is compromised by the bit, the tongue's color may change. Dr. Jacques Laurent identifies three possible forms of vascular changes in the horse's tongue:

- arterial compression, which results in a white coloration of the tongue;
- venous compression, leading to a blue and swollen tongue;
- mixed compression, which is the most frequent.

Laurent suggests that prolonged compromised vascularization can result in lingual amyotrophy and impaired sensitivity, both epi-critical and deep.

Swedish dressage horse rider Patrik Kittel has been noted for riding horses whose tongues exhibited a blue coloration, specifically Akeem Foldager in 2014 and Watermill Scandic in 2009. The situation generated discussion within the equestrian community, although Kittel was subsequently cleared of any wrongdoing by the Fédération Équestre Internationale.

=== Tongue-tying ===
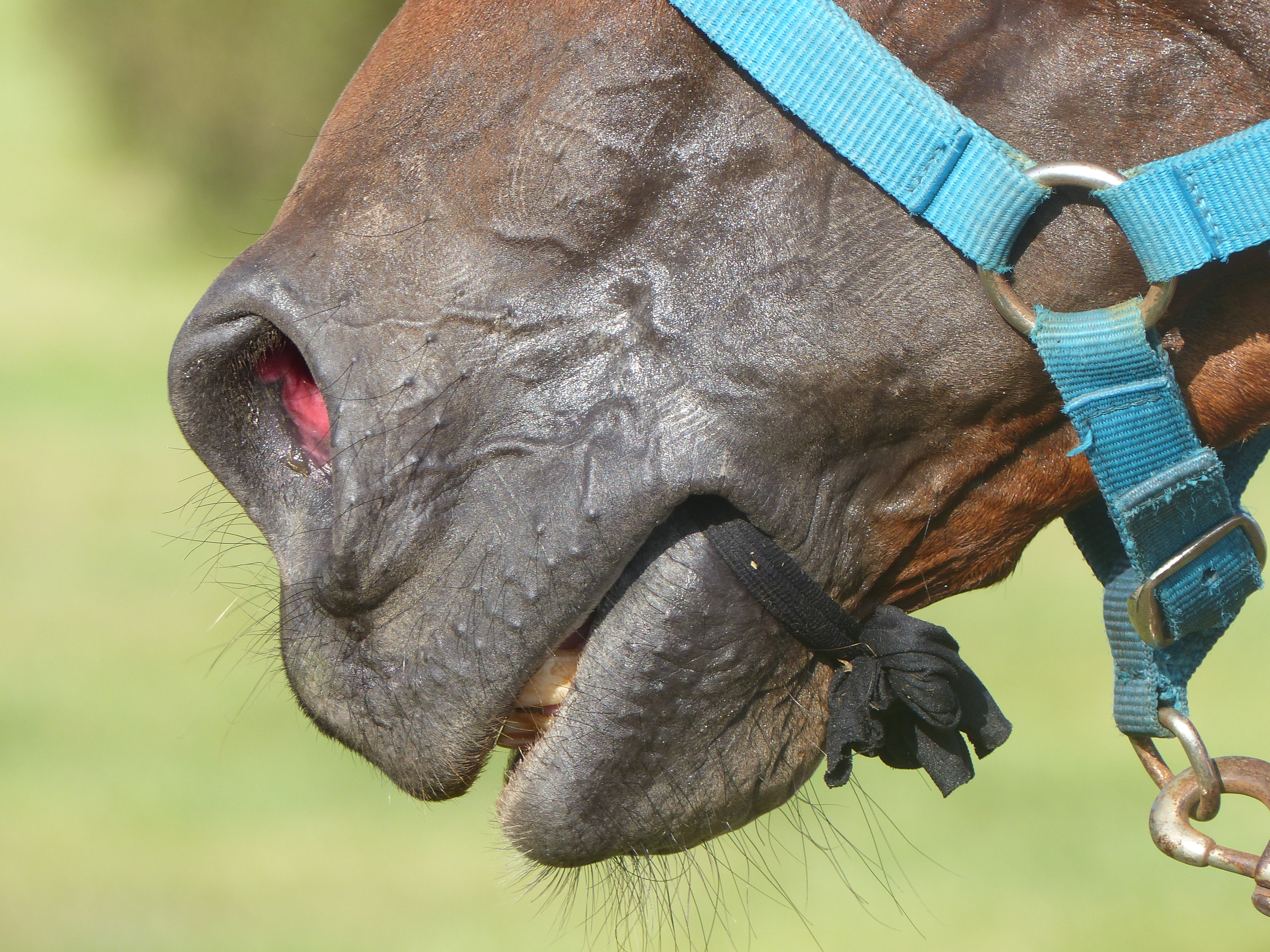
Tongue tie of a racehorse at the Josselin racecourse, France, in 2019

In racing, it is common practice to tie a racehorse's tongue to enhance control over the animal and due to the belief that this may facilitate easier breathing. The tongue tie is typically made using materials such as nylon stockings, elastic bands, or pieces of leather. The procedure involves grasping the horse's tongue to position the tie, which is then fastened around the lower jaw. While some countries, such as Germany, have banned the practice altogether, it remains permitted in Australia, where approximately 20% of racehorses are affected.

However, tongue-tying can cause injuries to horses. Reports indicate that over half of users observe a change in the color of the horse's tongue, with 8.6% noting cuts, and 2.9% reporting irreparable nerve damage. Importantly, there is no evidence that tying the tongue of a racehorse without pre-existing health issues improves breathing, either at rest or during racing.

The practice may provide benefits for horses suffering from respiratory obstructions, such as dorsal displacement of the soft palate (DDSP). Research indicates that a tied tongue can reduce the depth of the thyroid cartilage and basihyoid bone compared to an untied tongue, significantly affecting the positions of these structures and potentially impacting the upper respiratory tract. However, there is no evidence that tongue attachment can alter upper respiratory tract mechanics after sternothyrohyoid myectomy (cutting of certain muscles) in clinically normal horses.

Statistical analyses of racehorses in the United Kingdom suggest that those with tongue ties may perform better than those without.

== See also ==
- Horse teeth
