= Timeline of Carboniferous research =

This timeline of Carboniferous research is a chronological listing of events in the history of geology and paleontology focused on the study of earth during the span of time lasting from 358.9 to 298.9 million years ago and the legacies of this period in the rock and fossil records.

== 19th century ==
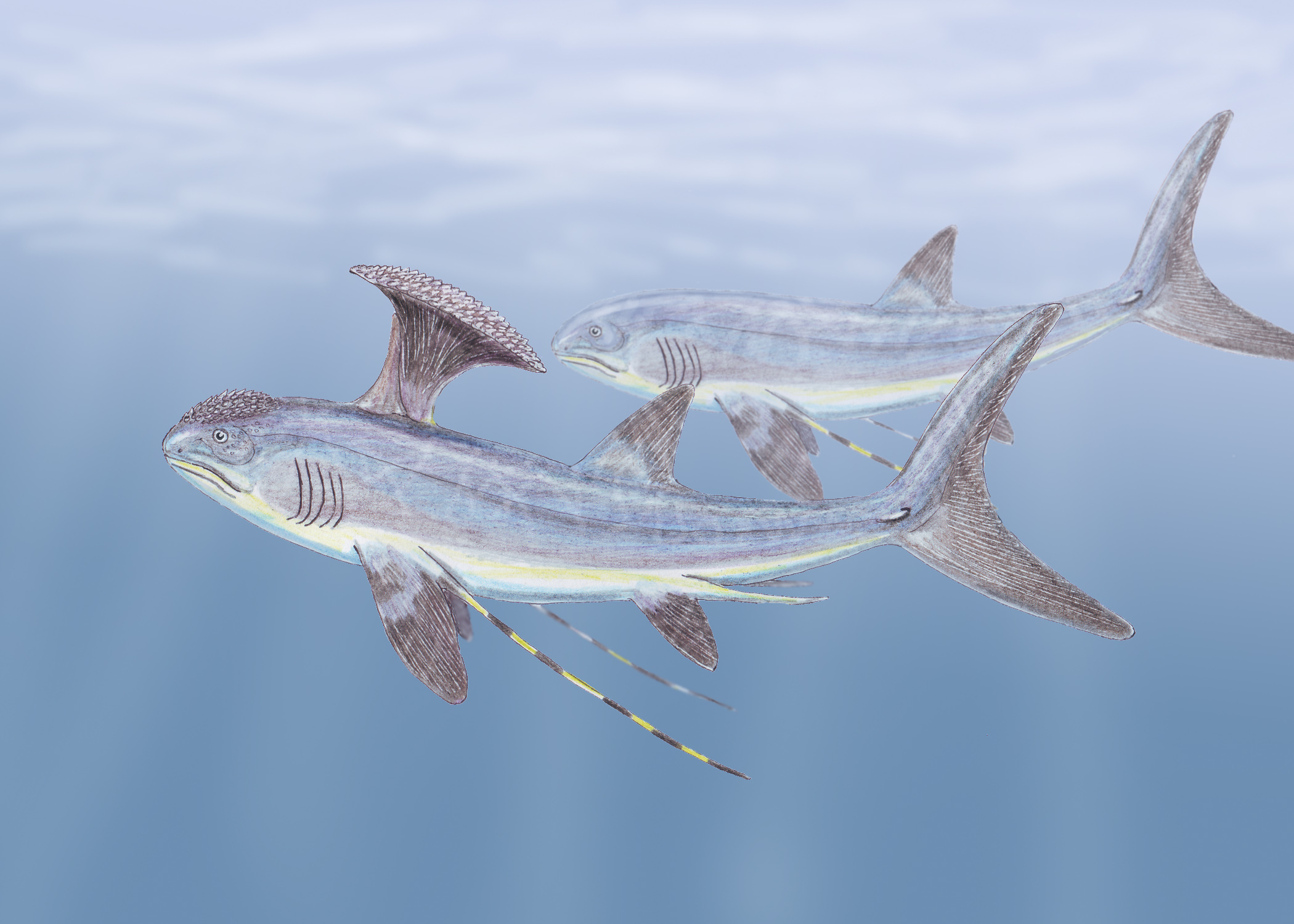
Stethacanthus.

=== 1828 ===
- Brongn. described the new genus Calamites.

=== 1853 ===
- Meyer described the new genus Arthropleura.

=== 1860 ===
- Dawson described the new genus Hylonomus.

=== 1882 ===
- Cope described the new genus Edaphosaurus.

=== 1887 ===
- Cope described the new genus Eryops.

=== 1889 ===
- Newberry described the new genus Stethacanthus.

=== 1899 ===
- Karpinsky described the new genus Helicoprion.

== 20th century ==
- Jeram described the new genus Pulmonoscorpius.

== See also ==
- History of paleontology
  - Timeline of paleontology
    - Timeline of Cambrian research
    - Timeline of Ordovician research
    - Timeline of Silurian research
    - Timeline of Devonian research
    - Timeline of Permian research
