= Timeline of Cambrian research =

This timeline of Cambrian research is a chronological listing of events in the history of geology and paleontology focused on the study of Earth during the span of time lasting from 538.8 to 485.4 million years ago (dates as per 2022 revision) and the legacies of this period in the rock and fossil records.

== 19th century ==
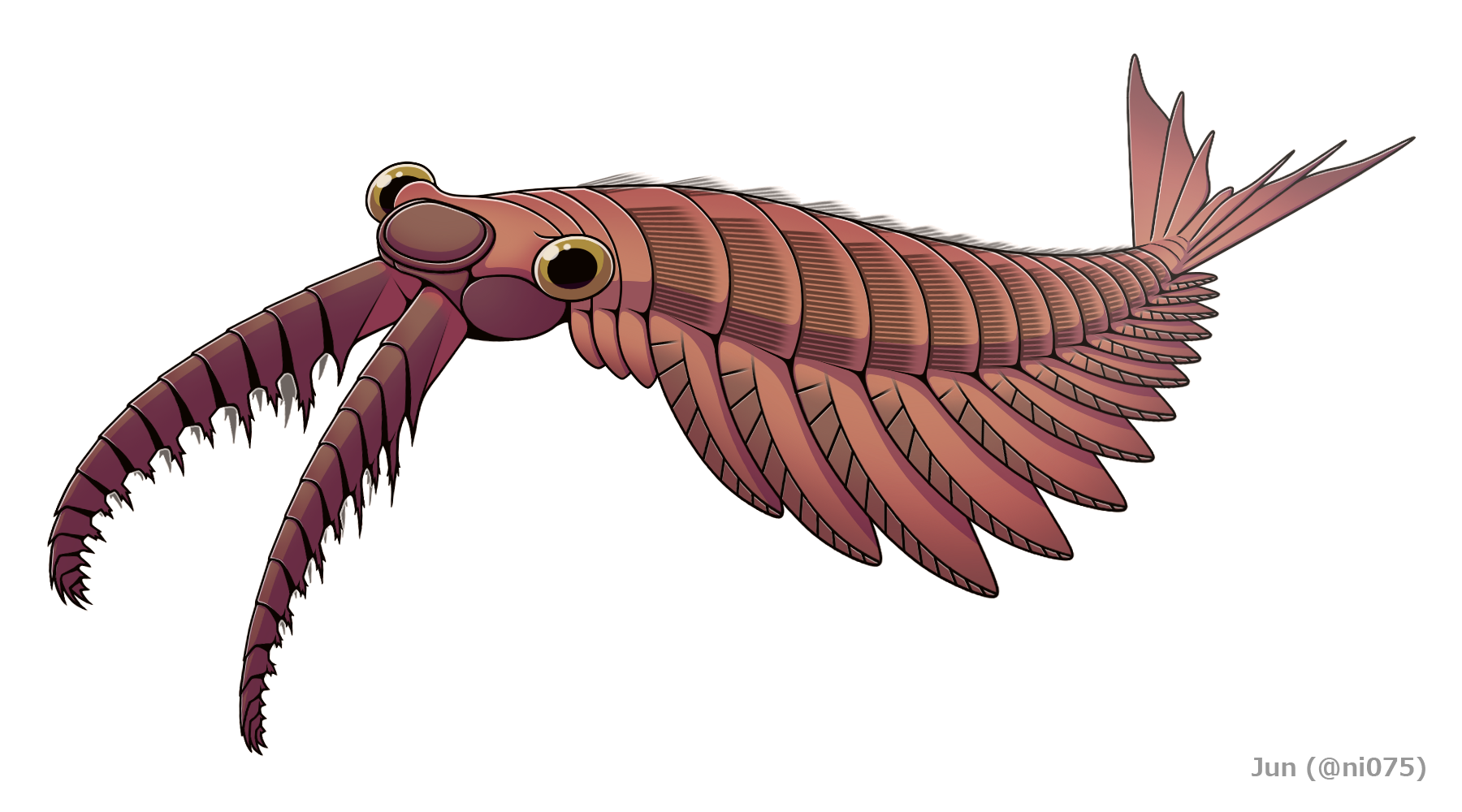
Anomalocaris.

=== 1892 ===
- Whiteaves described the new genus Anomalocaris.

== 20th century ==
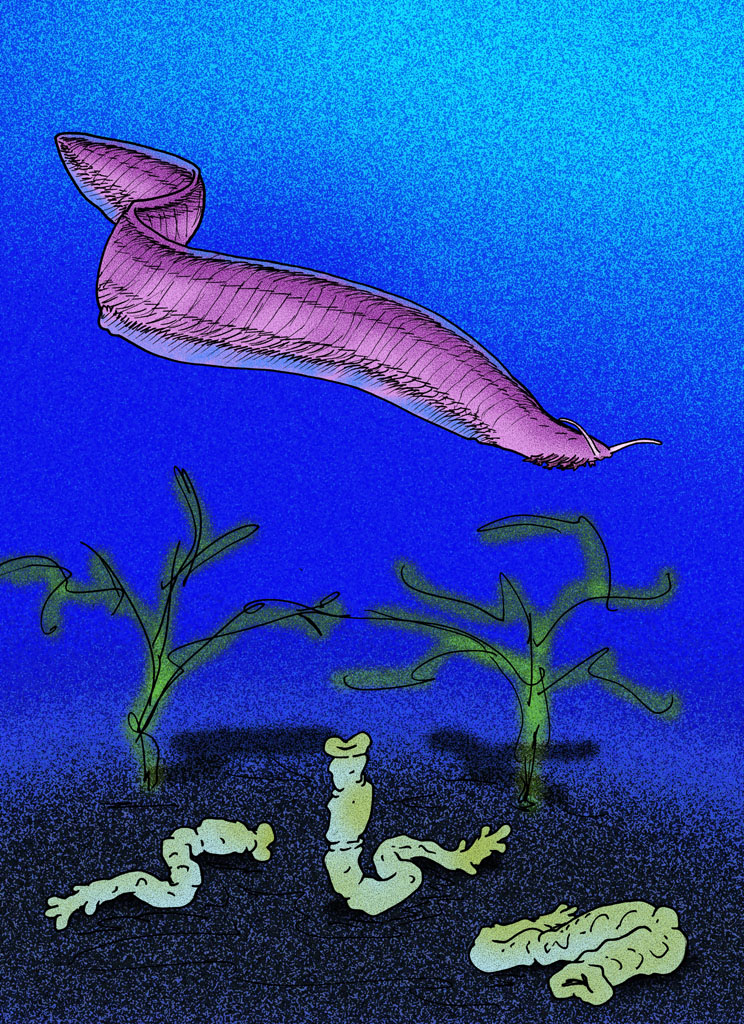
Pikaia.

=== 1911 ===
- Charles Walcott described the new genera Pikaia and Wiwaxia.

=== 1912 ===
- Walcott described the new genera Marrella and Opabinia.

=== 1977 ===
- Conway Morris described the new genus Hallucigenia.

== See also ==
- History of paleontology
  - Timeline of paleontology
    - Timeline of Ordovician research
    - Timeline of Silurian research
    - Timeline of Devonian research
    - Timeline of Carboniferous research
    - Timeline of Permian research
