= Timeline of Ordovician research =

This timeline of Ordovician research is a chronological listing of events in the history of geology and paleontology focused on the study of earth during the span of time lasting from 485.4–443.4 million years ago and the legacies of this period in the rock and fossil records.

== 18th century ==
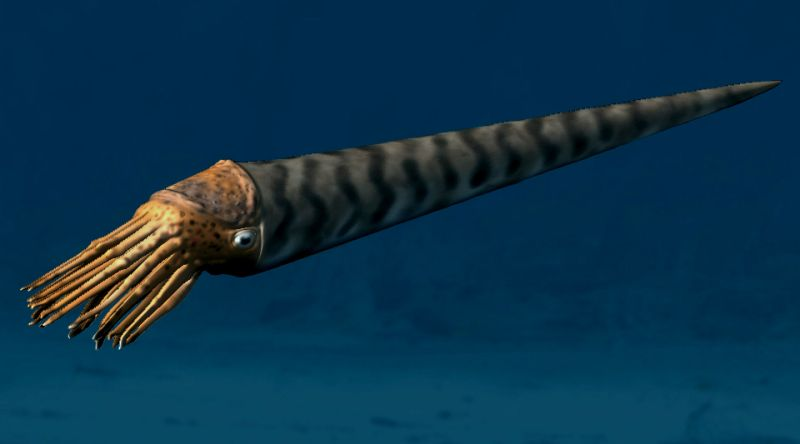
Orthoceras.

=== 1780s ===
==== 1789 ====
- Bruguière described the new genus Orthoceras

== 20th century ==
=== 1970s ===
==== 1978 ====
- Lindström, Maurits, described the earliest known octocoral in Sweden shifting the first known appearance from the Cretaceous to the Ordovician.

== 21st century ==
=== 2010s ===
==== 2015 ====
- Van Roy, Daley, and Briggs described the new genus and species Aegirocassis benmoulae.

== See also ==
- History of paleontology
  - Timeline of paleontology
    - Timeline of Cambrian research
    - Timeline of Silurian research
    - Timeline of Devonian research
    - Timeline of Carboniferous research
    - Timeline of Permian research
