= Timeline of Silurian research =

This timeline of Silurian research is a chronological listing of events in the history of geology and paleontology focused on the study of Earth during the span of time lasting from 443.4–419.2 million years ago; the Silurian, and the legacies of this period in the rock and fossil records.

== 19th century ==
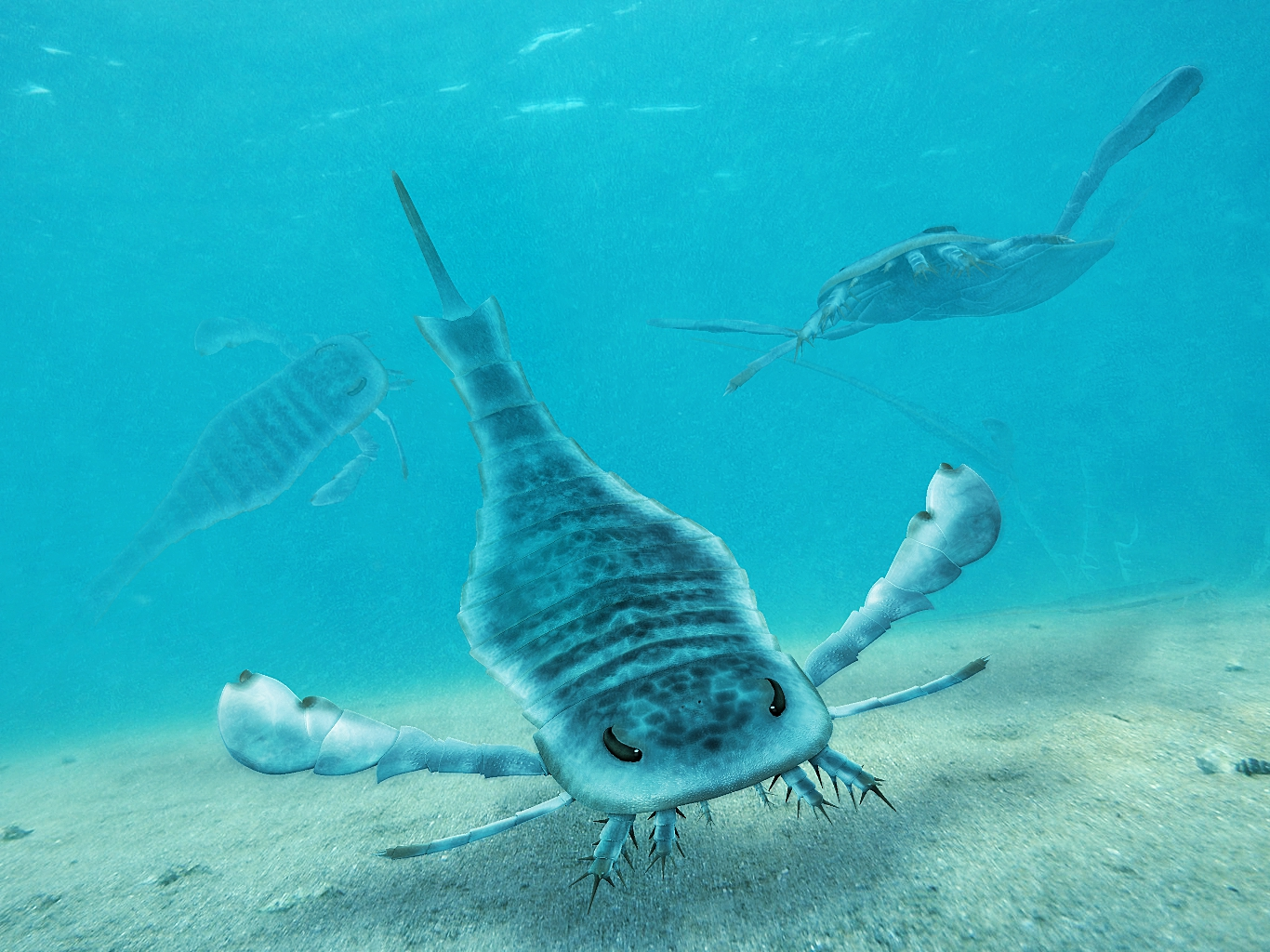
Eurypterus.

=== 1825 ===
- De Kay described the new genus Eurypterus.

=== 1835 ===
- Roderick Murchison proposes the Silurian period based on outcrops in Wales and publishes On the Silurian and Cambrian Systems, Exhibiting the Order in which the Older Sedimentary Strata Succeed each other in England and Wales with Adam Sedgwick.

=== 1844 ===
- Agassiz described the new genus Pterygotus.

=== 1859 ===
- Dawson described the new genus Prototaxites .

== 20th century ==
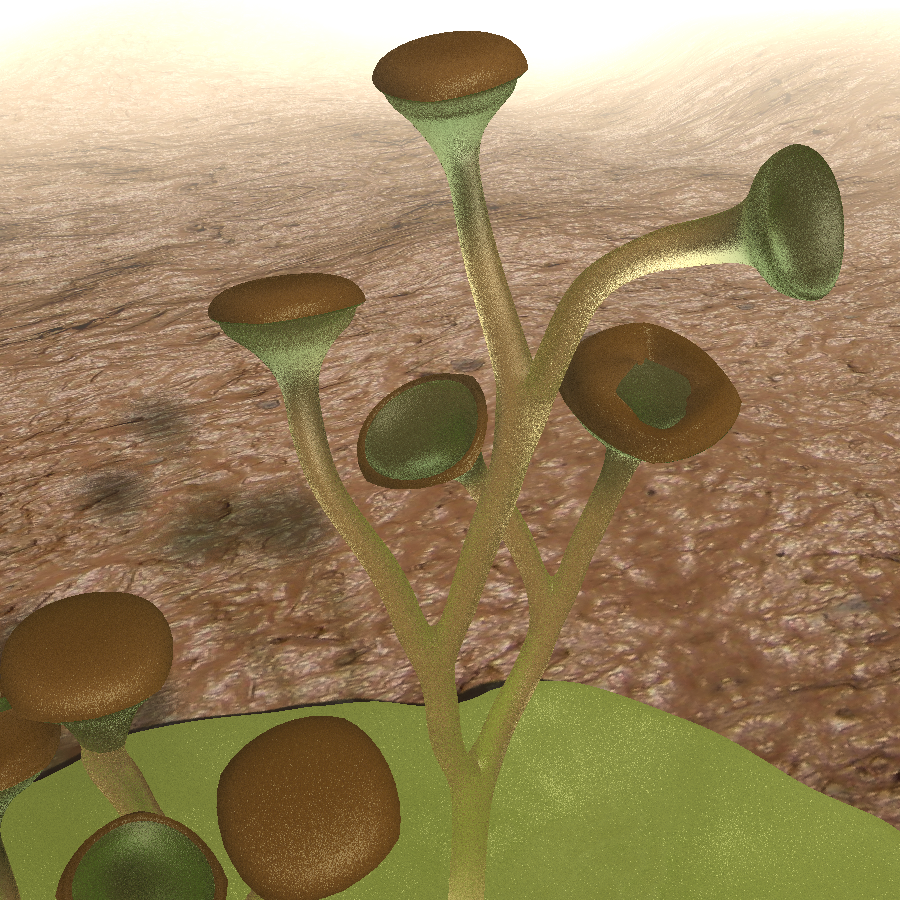
Cooksonia.

=== 1937 ===
- W. H. Lang described the new genus Cooksonia.

=== 1972 ===
- Kjellesvig-Waering described the new genus Brontoscorpio.

== 21st century ==
=== 2010 ===
- Gonez and Gerrienne emended genus Cooksonia described by W. H. Lang in 1937.

== See also ==
- History of paleontology
  - Timeline of paleontology
    - Timeline of Cambrian research
    - Timeline of Ordovician research
    - Timeline of Devonian research
    - Timeline of Carboniferous research
    - Timeline of Permian research
