= Timeline of Devonian research =

This timeline of Devonian research is a chronological listing of events in the history of geology and paleontology focused on the study of earth during the span of time lasting from 419.2 to 358.9 million years ago and the legacies of this period in the rock and fossil records.

== 19th century ==
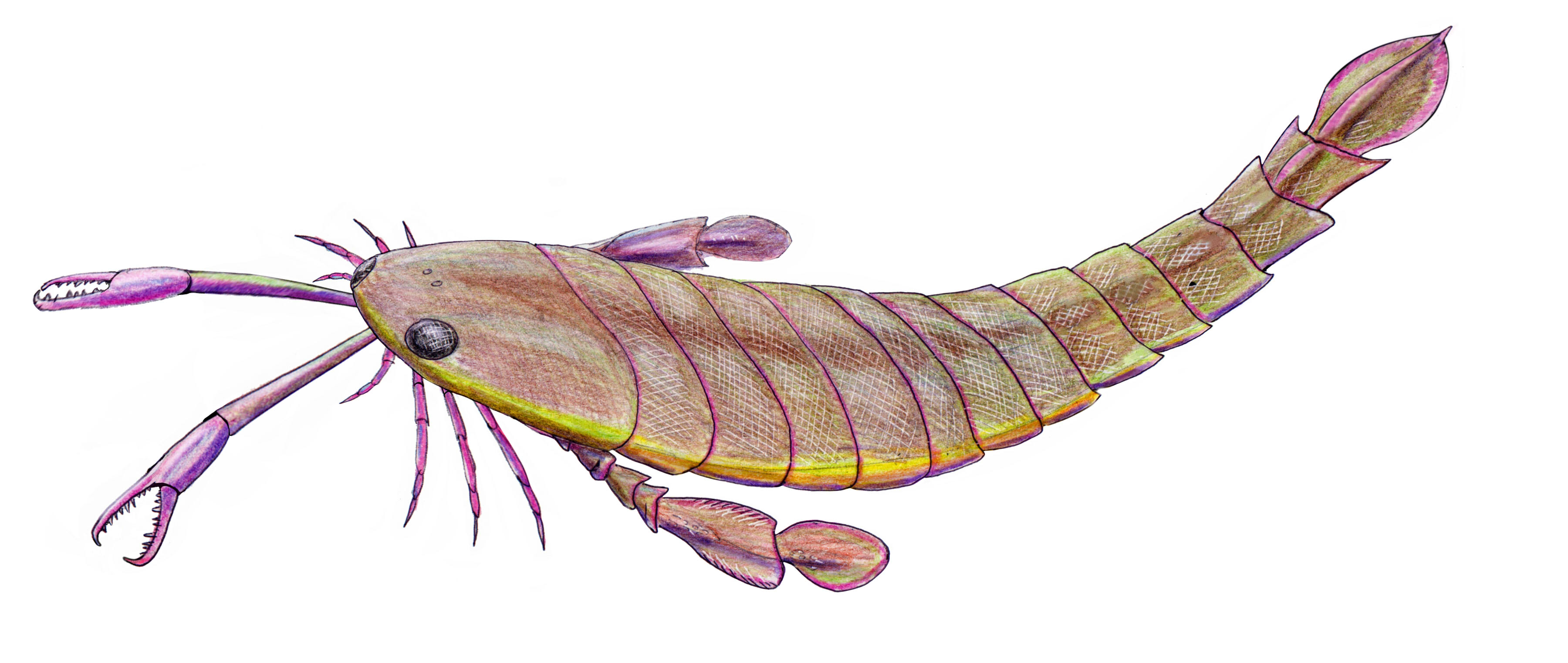
Pterygotus.

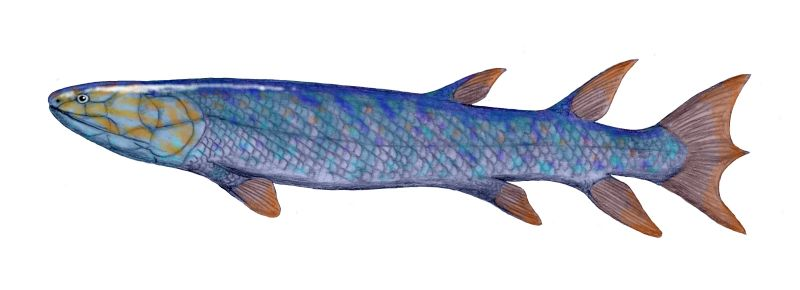
Eusthenopteron.

=== 1844 ===
- Agassiz described the new genus Pterygotus.

=== 1859 ===
- Dawson described the new genus Prototaxites .

=== 1881 ===
- Whiteaves described the new genus Eusthenopteron.

=== 1889 ===
- Newberry described the new genus Stethacanthus.

=== 1894 ===
- Dean described the new genus Cladoselache.

== 20th century ==
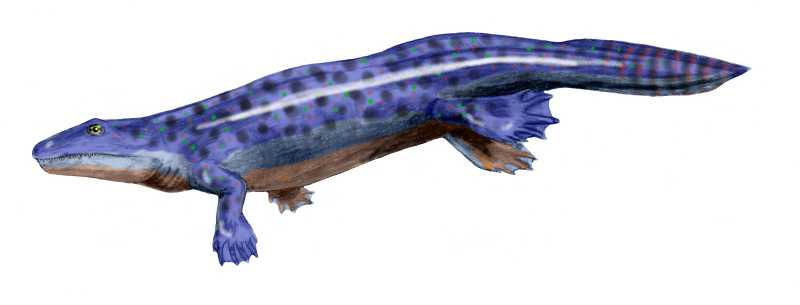
Ichthyostega.

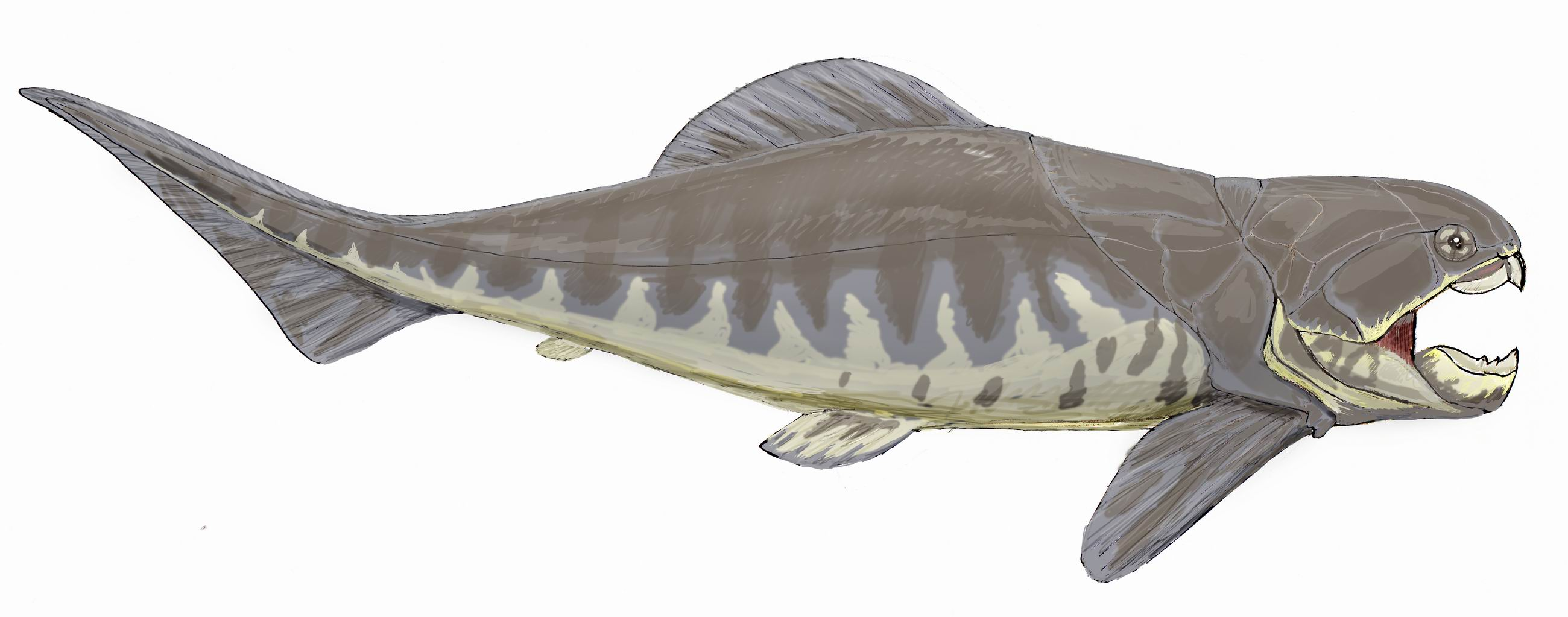
Dunkleosteus.

=== 1932 ===
- Säve-Söderbergh described the new genus Ichthyostega.

=== 1937 ===
- W. H. Lang described the new genus Cooksonia.

=== 1952 ===
- Jarvik described the new genus and species Acanthostega gunnari.

=== 1956 ===
- Lehman described the new genus Dunkleosteus.

=== 1968 ===
- Thomson described the new genus Hyneria.

== 21st century ==
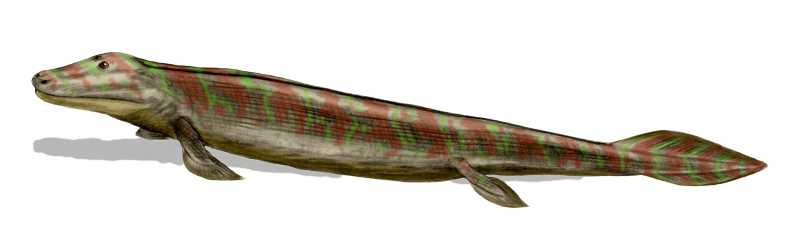
Tiktaalik.

=== 2006 ===
- Daeschler, Shubin & Jenkins described the new genus Tiktaalik.

=== 2010 ===
- Gonez and Gerrienne emended genus Cooksonia described by W. H. Lang in 1937.

== See also ==
- History of paleontology
  - Timeline of paleontology
    - Timeline of Cambrian research
    - Timeline of Ordovician research
    - Timeline of Silurian research
    - Timeline of Carboniferous research
    - Timeline of Permian research
