= Timeline of Permian research =

Chronological listing

This timeline of Permian research is a chronological listing of events in the history of geology and paleontology focused on the study of earth during the span of time lasting from 298.9–252.17 million years ago and the legacies of this period in the rock and fossil records.

== 19th century ==
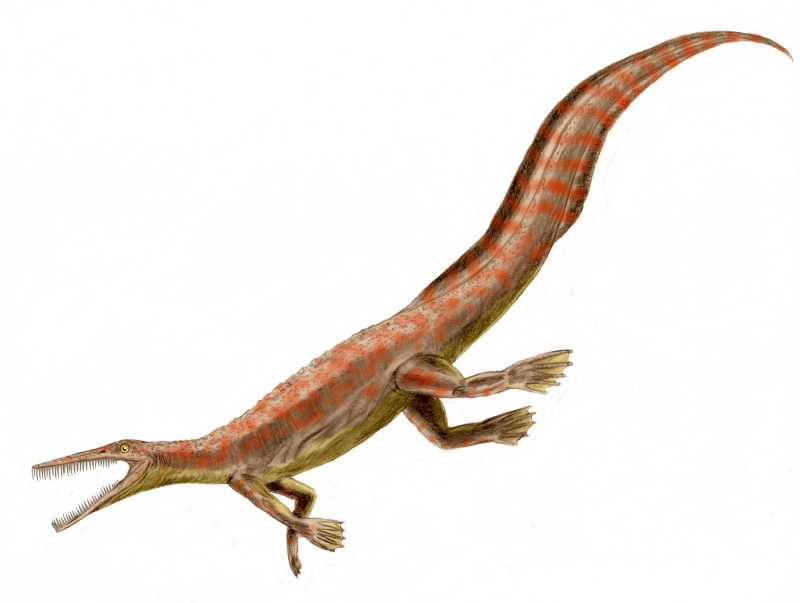
Mesosaurus

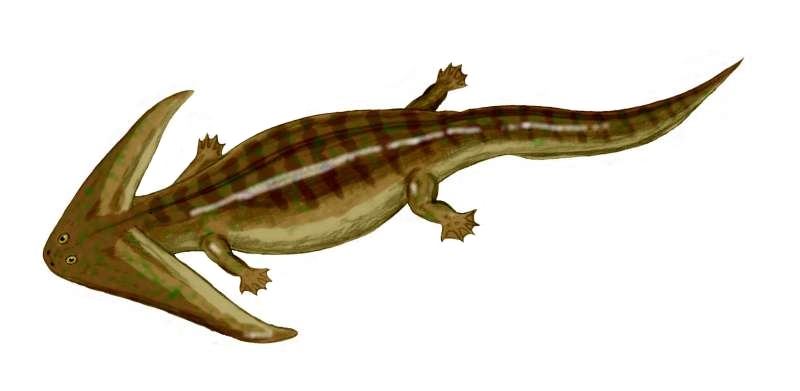
Diplocaulus

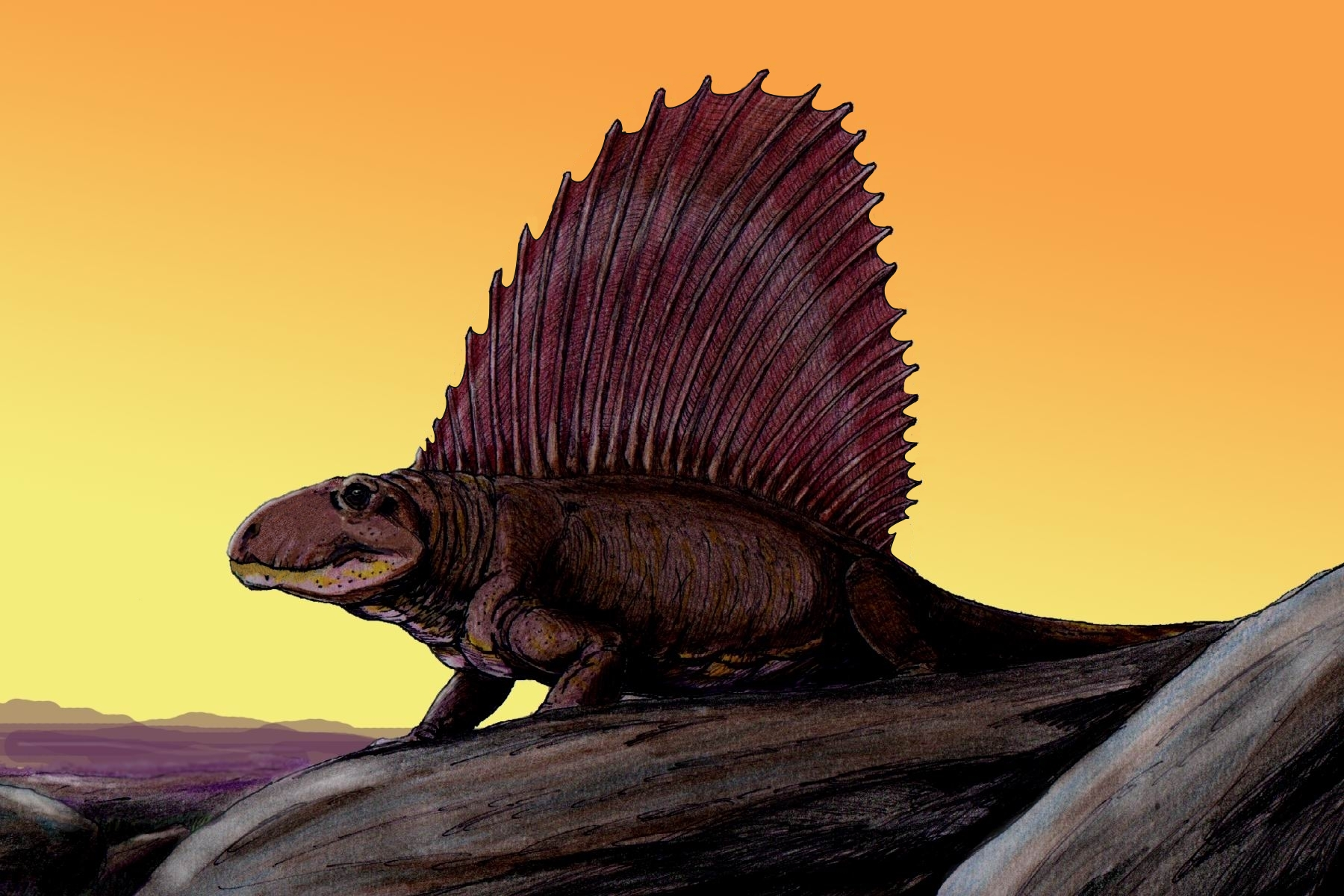
Dimetrodon

=== 1828 ===
- Brongn described the new genera Calamites and Glossopteris.

=== 1854 ===
- Meyer described the new genus Arthropleura.

=== 1855 ===
- Geinitz described the new genus Halonia.
  - Now it is considered synonymous with Arthropleura.

=== 1865 ===
- Gervais described the new genus Mesosaurus and species Mesosaurus tenuidens.

=== 1870 ===
- Cope described the new genus Lystrosaurus.

=== 1877 ===
- Cope described the new genus Diplocaulus.
- Cope described the new genus Dimetrodon.

=== 1882 ===
- Cope described the new genus Edaphosaurus.

=== 1887 ===
- Cope described the new genus Eryops.

=== 1889 ===
- Gürich described the new genus Ditrochosaurus and species Ditrochosaurus capensis.
- Gürich described the new species Mesosaurus capensis.
- Gürich synonymized subjectively Stereosternum with Mesosaurus.

=== 1899 ===
- Karpinsky described the new genus Helicoprion.

== 20th century ==
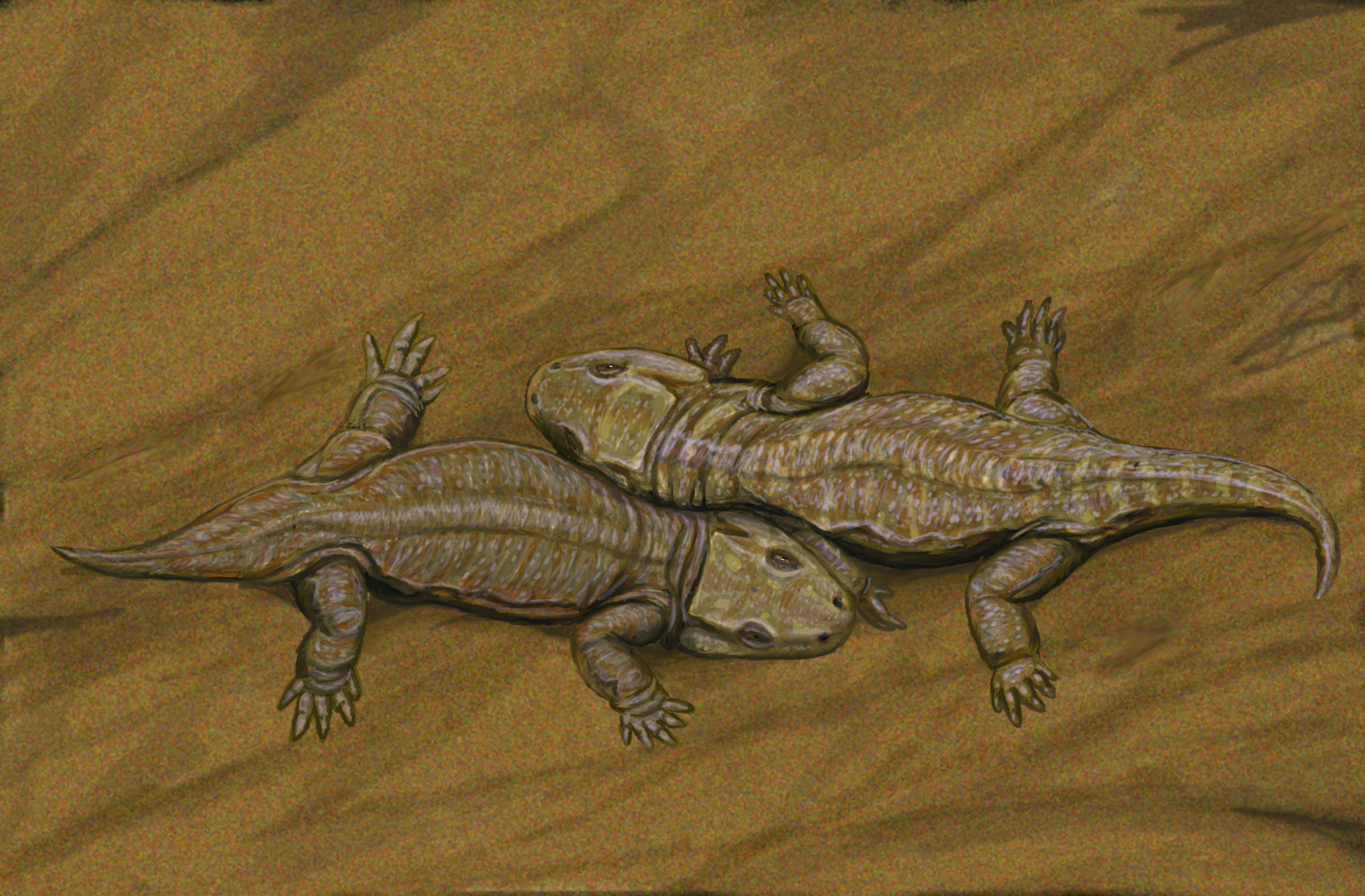
Seymouria

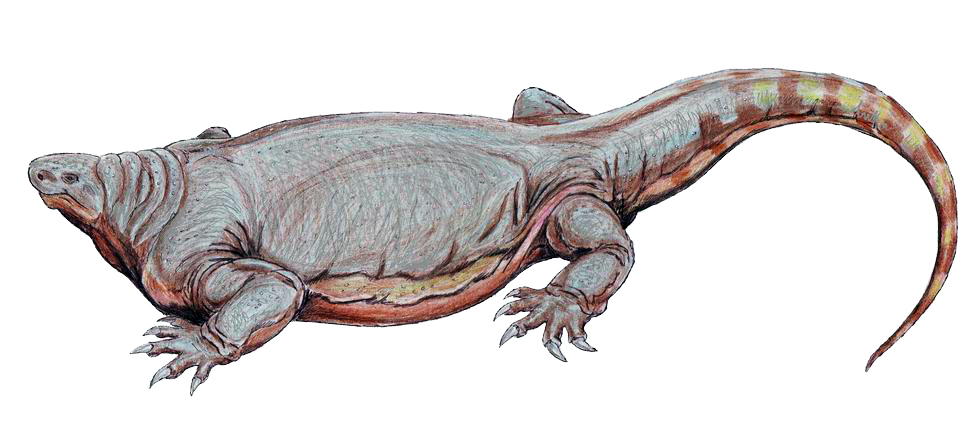
Cotylorhynchus

=== 1904 ===
- Broili described the new genus Seymouria.

=== 1911 ===
- Broom described the new genus and species Moschops capensis.

=== 1919 ===
- Pruvost synonymized subjectively Halonia with Arthropleura.

=== 1922 ===
- Amalitsky described the new genus Inostrancevia.

=== 1937 ===
- Stovall described the new genus Cotylorhynchus.

=== 1948 ===
- L. I. Price described the new genus Prionosuchus.

== 21st century ==
=== 2018 ===
- Niko et al. described the new species Sutherlandia jamalensis.
- Wu et al. described the new species Juxathyris subcircularis.
- Torres-Martínez, Sour-Tovar and Barragán described the new genus Kukulkanus and species Kukulkanus spinosus.
- Afanasjeva, Jun-Ichi and Yukio described the new species Leurosina katasumiensis.
- Tazawa and Araki described the new species Neochonetes (Huangichonetes) matsukawensis.
- Terrill, Henderson and Anderson published article about histological sections of Ordovician and Permian conodont dental elements from the Bell Canyon Formation (Texas, United States), Harding Sandstone (Colorado, United States), Ali Bashi Formation (Iran) and Canadian Arctic, examining those fossils for the presence and distribution of soft tissue biomarkers.
- Yuan, Zhang and Shen described the new species Mesogondolella hendersoni.
- Golding and Orchard in Golding described the new genus Pustulognathus and species Pustulognathus vigilans.
- Read and Nestell described the new species Sweetognathus duplex.
- Read and Nestell described the new species Sweetognathus wardlawi.
- Golubev and Bulanov published article about description of anamniote tetrapod fossils from the Late Permian Sundyr Tetrapod Assemblage (Mari El, Russia).
- Tarailo published article about a study on the relationship between taxonomic and ecological diversity of temnospondyls across the Permian–Triassic boundary in the Karoo Basin of South Africa.
- Gee and Reisz published article about well-preserved postcranial skeletons of two dissorophids are described from the early Permian karst deposits near Richards Spur (Oklahoma, United States).
- Gee and Reisz published article about new skull remains of Cacops morrisi, as well as the first known postcranial remains of the taxon, are described from the Permian of the Richards Spur locality (Oklahoma, United States).

=== 2019 ===
- Abdala et al. described the new genus Vetusodon and new species Vetusodon elikhulu.
- Kammerer described the new genus Thliptosaurus and species Thliptosaurus imperforatus.
- Spindler, Werneburg and Schneider described the new genus Cabarzia and species Cabarzia trostheidei.
- Suchkova and Golubev described the new species Gorynychus sundyrensis.
- Suchkova and Golubev described the new genus Julognathus and species Julognathus crudelis.
- Reisz described the new genus Arisierpeton and species Arisierpeton simplex.

== See also ==
- History of paleontology
  - Timeline of paleontology
    - Timeline of Cambrian research
    - Timeline of Ordovician research
    - Timeline of Silurian research
    - Timeline of Devonian research
    - Timeline of Carboniferous research
