= Timeline of paleontology =

Timeline of paleontology

== Antiquity – 16th century ==
- 6th century B.C. — The pre-Socratic Greek philosopher Xenophanes of Colophon argues that fossils of marine organisms show that dry land was once under water.
- 4th century B.C. — Aristotle posits that the stoniness of fossils is caused by vaporous exhalations.
- 1027 — The Persian naturalist Avicenna elaborates on Aristotle's speculations in The Book of Healing by proposing that fossils are caused by petrifying fluids (succus lapidificatus).
- 1031-1095 — The Chinese naturalist Shen Kuo uses evidence of marine fossils found in the Taihang Mountains to infer geological processes caused shifting of seashores over time, and uses petrified bamboos found underground in Yan'an to argue for gradual climate change.
- 1320-1390 — Avicenna's theory of petrifying fluids is elaborated on by Albert of Saxony.
- c. 1500 — Leonardo da Vinci uses ichnofossils to complement his hypothesis concerning the biogenic nature of body fossils.

== 17th century ==
- 1665 — In his book Micrographia Robert Hooke compares petrified wood to wood, concludes that petrified wood formed from wood soaked in mineral-rich water, and argues that fossils like Ammonite shells were produced the same way, sparking debate over the organic origin of fossils and the possibility of extinction.
- 1669 — Nicolas Steno writes that some kinds of rock formed from layers of sediment deposited in water and that fossils were organic remains buried in the process.
- 1699 - Edward Lhuyd names the new sauropod genus and species "Ruttelum implicatum". By doing so, he names the first prehistoric creature that is recognizable as a dinosaur.

== 18th century ==
- 1770 — The fossilized bones of a huge animal are found in a quarry near Maastricht in the Netherlands. In 1808 Georges Cuvier identified it as an extinct marine reptile and in 1822 William Conybeare names it Mosasaurus.
- 1789 — The skeleton of a large animal is unearthed in Argentina. In 1796 Cuvier reports that it had an affinity to modern tree sloths and names it Megatherium.
- 1796 — Cuvier presents a paper on living and fossil elephants that shows that mammoths were a different species from any living elephant. He argues that this proved the reality of extinction, which he attributes to a geological catastrophe.
- 1800 — Cuvier writes that a drawing of a fossil found in Bavaria shows a flying reptile; in 1809 he names it Pterodactyl.

== 19th century ==
- 1804 — Cuvier writes about fossils of extinct mammals from the Paris Basin, arguing that they are similar to other mammals such as ruminants but also differ by dental and postcranial morphologies. He named two genera Palaeotherium and Anoplotherium.
- 1808 — Cuvier and Alexandre Brongniart publish preliminary results of their survey of the geology of the Paris Basin that uses the fossils found in different strata to reconstruct the geologic history of the region.
- 1811 — Mary Anning and her brother Joseph discover the fossilized remains of an Ichthyosaur at Lyme Regis.
- 1812 - Cuvier draws skeletal reconstructions of "Palaeotherium" minor (= Plagiolophus minor), "Anoplotherium medium" (= Xiphodon gracilis), and, most famously, Anoplotherium commune based on known fossil remains (of which A. commune was the most nearly complete) and publishes them in his 1812 summary of fossil mammals from Paris. He also drew speculative reconstructions of the muscles of A. commune to showcase its robustness but did not publish them out of concern of negative perceptions on speculations.
- 1815 — William Smith published The Map that Changed the World, the first geologic map of England, Wales, and southern Scotland, using fossils to correlate rock strata.
- 1821 — William Buckland analyzes Kirkdale Cave in Yorkshire, containing the bones of lions, elephants and rhinoceros, and concludes it was a prehistoric hyena den.
- 1821-1822 — Mary Anning discovers the world's first Plesiosaur skeleton at Lyme Regis.
- 1822 — Mary Ann Mantell and Gideon Mantell discover fossil teeth of the dinosaur Iguanodon.
- 1822 — The editor of the French journal Journal de Phisique, Henri Marie Ducrotay de Blainville, invents the word "paleontologie" for the reconstruction of ancient animals and plants from fossils.
- 1823 — Buckland finds a human skeleton with mammoth remains at Paviland Cave on the Gower Peninsula, but at the time it is not accepted that this showed they coexisted.
- 1824 — Buckland finds the lower jaw of the carnivorous dinosaur Megalosaurus.
- 1829 — Buckland publishes a paper on work he and Mary Anning had done identifying and analyzing fossilized feces found at Lyme Regis and elsewhere. Buckland coins the term "coprolite" for them and uses them to analyze ancient food chains.
- 1830 — The Cuvier–Geoffroy debate in Paris on the determination of animal structure
- 1831 — Mantell publishes an influential paper entitled "The Age of Reptiles" summarizing evidence of an extended period during which large reptiles had been the dominant animals.
- 1832 — Mantell finds a partial skeleton of the dinosaur Hylaeosaurus.
- 1836 — Edward Hitchcock describes footprints (Eubrontes and Otozoum) of giant birds from Jurassic formations in Connecticut. Later they would be recognized as dinosaur tracks.
- 1841 — Anatomist Richard Owen creates a new order of reptiles, dinosauria, for the animals Iguanodon, Megalosaurus, and Hylaeosaurus, found by Mantell and Buckland.
- 1841 — The first global geologic timescale is defined by John Phillips based on the type of fossils found in different rock layers. He coins the term "Mesozoic" for what Mantell had called "The Age of Reptiles."
- 1856 — Fossils are found in the Neander Valley in Germany that Johann Carl Fuhlrott and Hermann Schaaffhausen recognize as a human different from modern people. A few years later William King names it Homo neanderthalensis.
- 1858 — The first dinosaur skeleton found in the United States, Hadrosaurus, is excavated and described by Joseph Leidy.
- 1859 — Charles Darwin publishes On the Origin of Species.
- 1861 — The first Archaeopteryx, skeleton is found in Bavaria, Germany, and recognized as a transitional form between reptiles and birds.
- 1869 — Joseph Lockyer starts the scientific journal Nature.
- 1871 — Othniel Charles Marsh discovers the first American pterosaur fossils.
- 1874-77 — Marsh finds a series of Equid fossils in the American West that shed light on the evolution of the horse.
- 1877 — The first Diplodocus skeleton is found near Cañon City, Colorado.
- 1891 — Eugene Dubois discovers fossils of "Java Man" (Homo erectus) in Indonesia.

== 20th century ==
- 1901 — Petroleum geologist W.W. Orcutt recovers the first fossils from the La Brea Tar Pits in Southern California, a rich source of ice age mammal remains.
- 1905 — Dippy the diplodocus is exhibited in London's Natural History Museum; its multiple casts and high profile make the word "dinosaur" a household name
- 1905 — Tyrannosaurus rex, later the world's most famous dinosaur species, is first described and named by Henry Fairfield Osborn.
- 1909 — Cambrian fossils in the Burgess Shale are discovered by Charles Walcott.
- 1912 — Continental Drift is proposed by Alfred Wegener, leading to plate tectonics, which explained many patterns of ancient biogeography revealed by the fossil record.
- 1912 — Charles Dawson announces the discovery of "Piltdown Man" in England, a hoax that would confuse paleoanthropology until the fossils were revealed as forgeries in 1953.
- 1912-15 — Spinosaurus is found in North Africa and is speculated to be the largest terrestrial predator that ever lived.
- 1920 — Andrew Douglass proposes dendrochronology (tree-ring dating).
- 1924 — Raymond Dart examines fossils of "Taung Child," found by quarrymen in South Africa, and names it Australopithecus africanus.
- 1944 — The publication of Tempo and Mode in Evolution by George Gaylord Simpson integrates paleontology into the modern evolutionary synthesis.
- 1946 — Reginald Sprigg discovers fossils of the Ediacaran biota in Australia. In the 1960s Martin Glaessner would show that they were pre-Cambrian.
- 1947 — Willard Libby introduces carbon-14 dating.
- 1953 — Stanley A. Tyler discovers microfossils in the Gunflint Chert Formation of cyanobacteria that created pre-Cambrian stromatolites approximately 2 billion years ago.
- 1972 — Niles Eldredge and Stephen Jay Gould propose punctuated equilibrium, claiming that the evolutionary history of most species involves long intervals of stasis between relatively short periods of rapid change.
- 1974 — Donald Johanson and Tom Gray discover a 3.5 million-year-old female hominid fossil that is 40% complete and name it "Lucy."
- 1980 — Luis Alvarez, Walter Alvarez, Frank Asaro, and Helen Michel propose the Alvarez hypothesis, that a comet or asteroid struck the Earth 66 million years ago, causing the Cretaceous–Paleogene extinction event, including the extinction of the non-avian dinosaurs, and enriching the iridium in the K–T boundary.
- 1982 — Jack Sepkoski and David M. Raup publish a statistical analysis of the fossil record of marine invertebrates that shows a pattern (possibly cyclical) of repeated mass extinctions.
- 1984 — Hou Xianguang discovers the Maotianshan Shales Cambrian fossil site in the Yunnan province of China.
- 1993 — Johannes G.M. Thewissen and Sayed Taseer Hussain discover fossils of the amphibious whale ancestor Ambulocetus in Pakistan.
- 1996 — Li Yumin discovers a fossil of the theropod dinosaur Sinosauropteryx showing evidence of feathers in the Liaoning province of China.

== 21st century ==
- 2004 — Tiktaalik, a transitional form between lobe-finned fish and tetrapods is discovered in Canada by Ted Daeschler, Neil H. Shubin, and Farish A. Jenkins Jr.
- 2009 — Fossils of Titanoboa, a giant snake, are unearthed in the coal mines of Cerrejón in La Guajira, Colombia, suggesting paleocene equatorial temperatures were higher than today.
- 2016 — Tail fossils of a baby species of coelurosaur, fully preserved in amber including soft tissue, are found in Myanmar by Lida Xing

== See also ==
- History of biology
- History of geology
- History of paleontology
