= List of informally named dinosaurs =

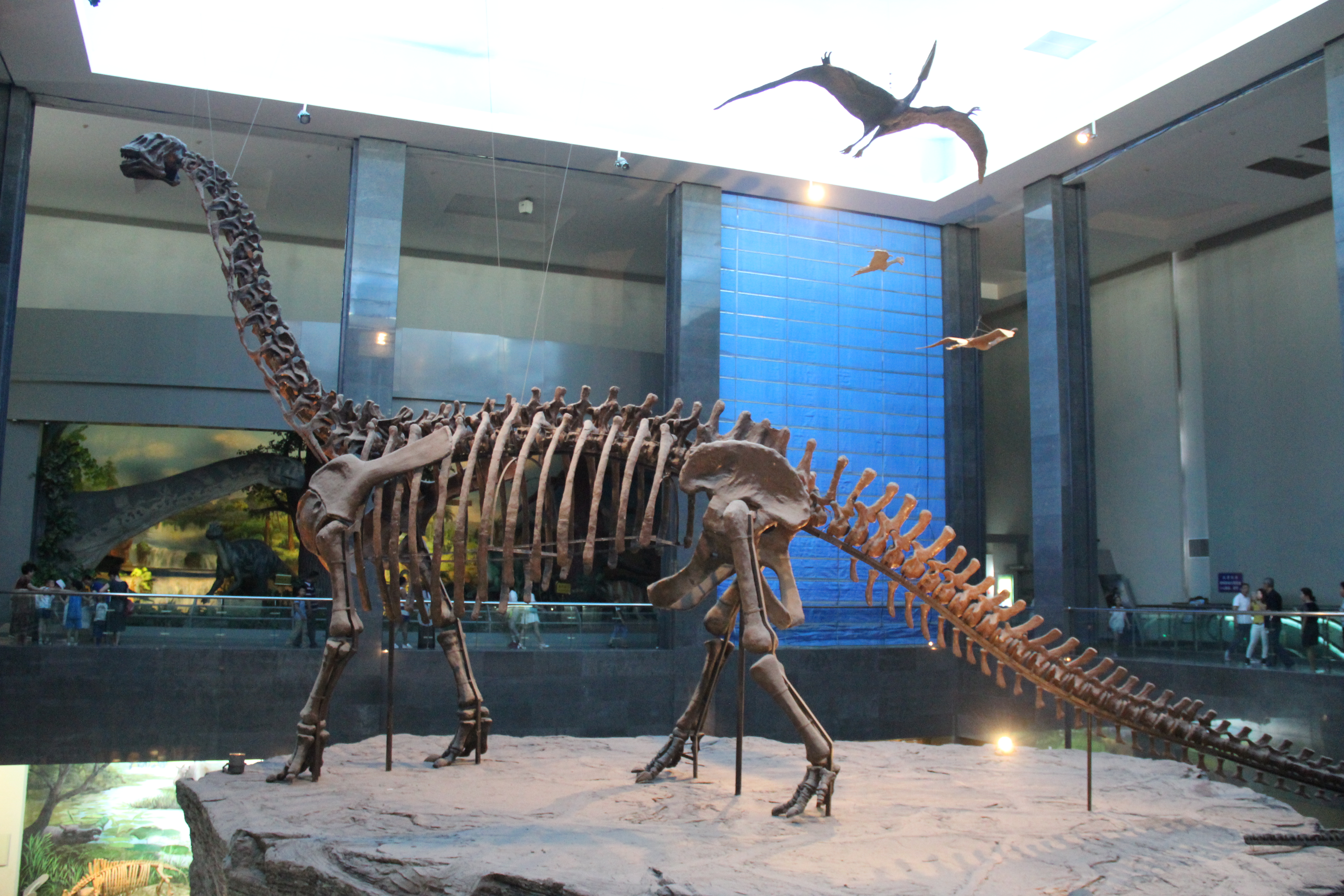
"Nurosaurus" mounted skeleton, Inner Mongolia Museum

This list of informally named dinosaurs is a listing of dinosaurs (excluding birds) that have never been given formally published scientific names. This list only includes names that were not properly published ("unavailable names") and have not since been published under a valid name (see list of dinosaur genera for valid names). The following types of names are present on this list:

- Nomen nudum, Latin for "naked name": A name that has appeared in print but has not yet been formally published by the standards of the International Commission on Zoological Nomenclature. Nomina nuda (the plural form) are invalid, and are therefore not italicized as a proper generic name would be.
- Nomen manuscriptum, Latin for "manuscript name": A name that appears in manuscript but was not formally published. A nomen manuscriptum is equivalent to a nomen nudum for everything except the method of publication, and description.
- Nomen ex dissertationae, Latin for "dissertation name": A name that appears in a dissertation but was not formally published.
- Nicknames or descriptive names given to specimens or taxa by researchers or the press.
- Names published in predatory journals.

== A ==
=== Alamotyrannus ===
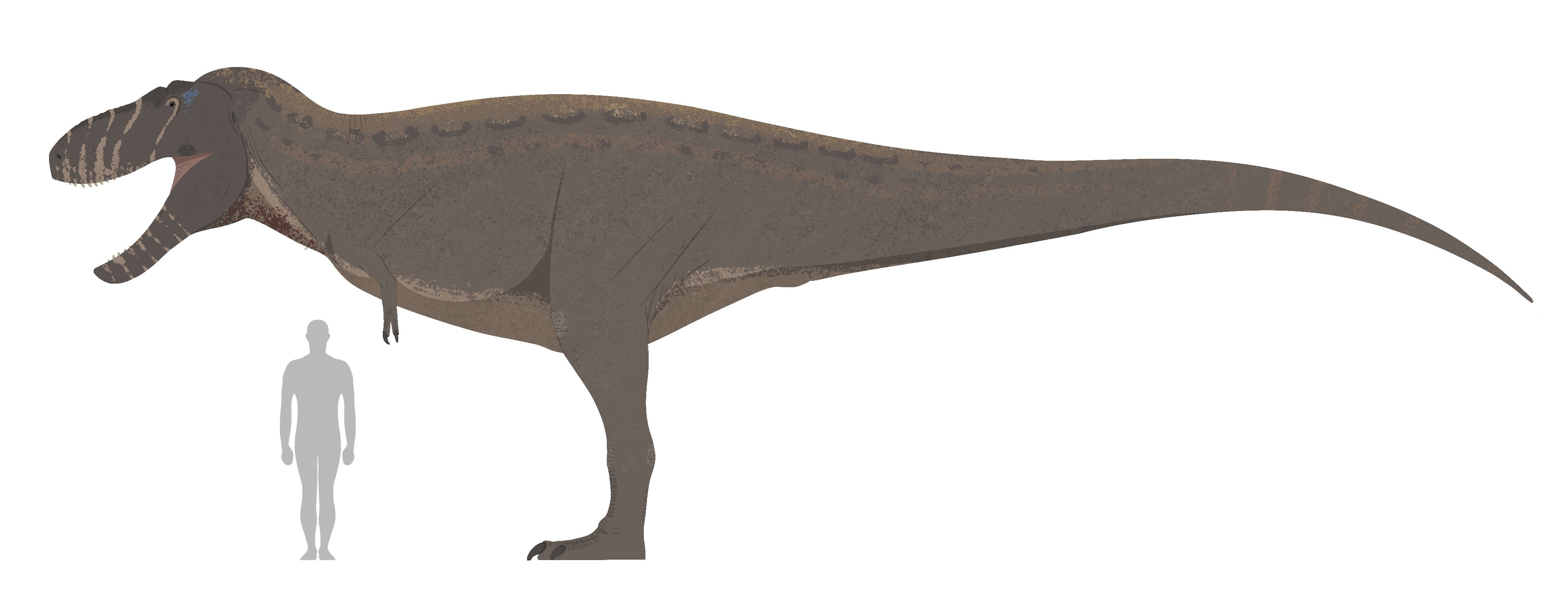
Life restoration of "Alamotyrannus"

"Alamotyrannus" ("Ojo Alamo tyrant") is an informal name for an undescribed genus or species of tyrannosaurid dinosaur known from the Ojo Alamo Formation in New Mexico, United States. Its fossils were discovered in the early 2000s and date to the early Maastrichtian age of the Late Cretaceous. The proposed binomial name Alamotyrannus brinkmani was introduced in a manuscript written in 2013.

Specimen ACM 7975, a jaw discovered in the Ojo Alamo Formation in 1924, has been tentatively identified as Gorgosaurus libratus, although it may instead belong to "Alamotyrannus". Dalman & Lucas (2016) classified it as an indeterminate tyrannosaurid without assigning it to a genus and noted that it was under study by the paper's senior author. A photograph published by McDavid in 2022 shows the specimen on display in the Beneski Museum of Natural History.

=== Alan the Dinosaur ===
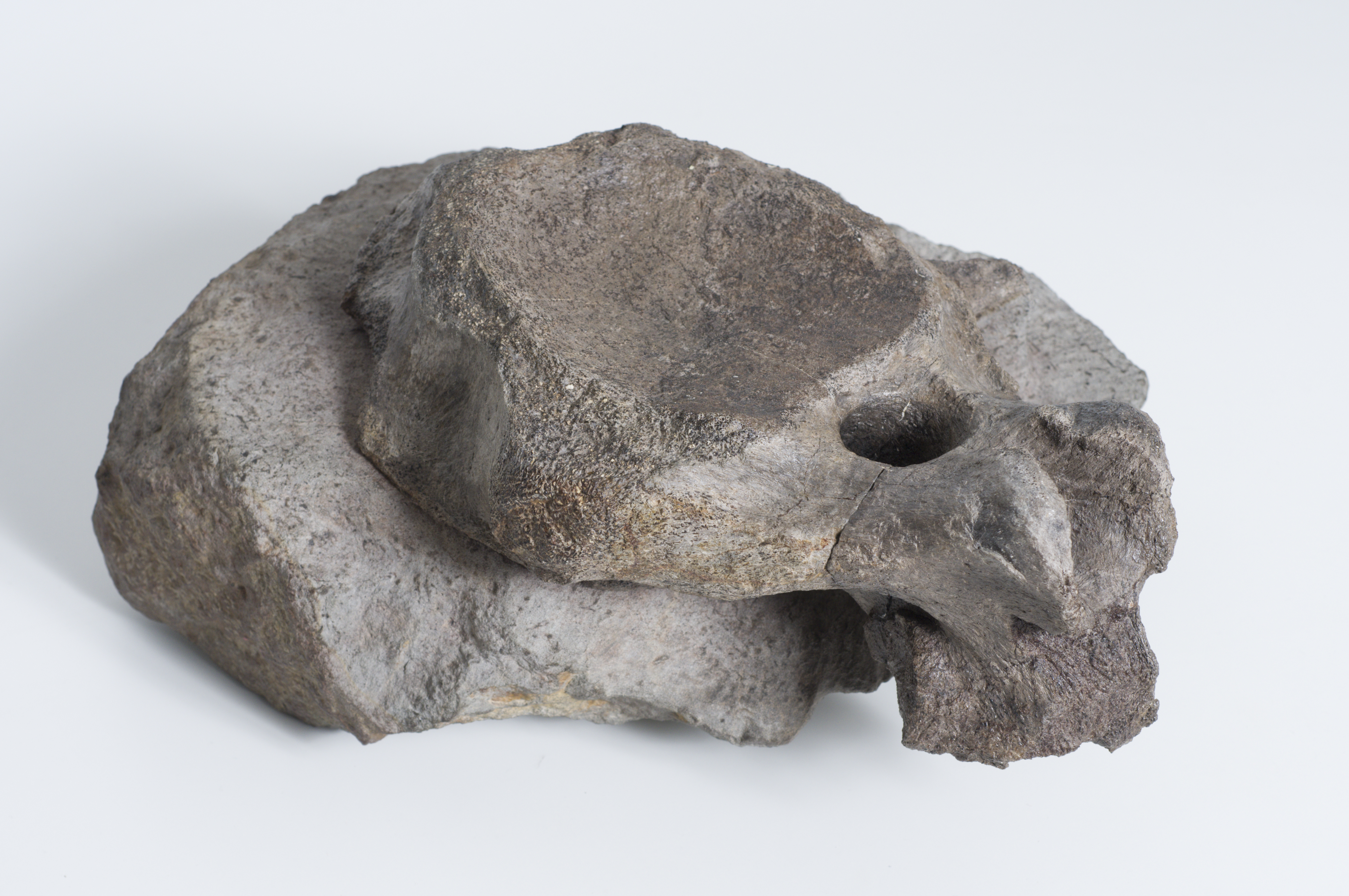
Alan the Dinosaur

"Alan the Dinosaur" is the informal name given to a sauropod caudal vertebra (YORYM:2001.9337) discovered by Alan Gurr in 1995 in the Middle Jurassic Aalenian-age Saltwick Formation of Whitby, England. Dating to approximately 176-172 million years ago, it is the oldest known sauropod fossil from the United Kingdom. The name refers to its discoverer and the specimen's uncertain taxonomic identity. A 2015 analysis classified it within Eusauropoda, excluded it from Diplodocoidea, and found it most similar to Cetiosaurus.

The fossil is housed at the Yorkshire Museum, where it is featured in the Yorkshire's Jurassic World exhibition, which includes a virtual reality recreation.

=== Allosaurus robustus ===
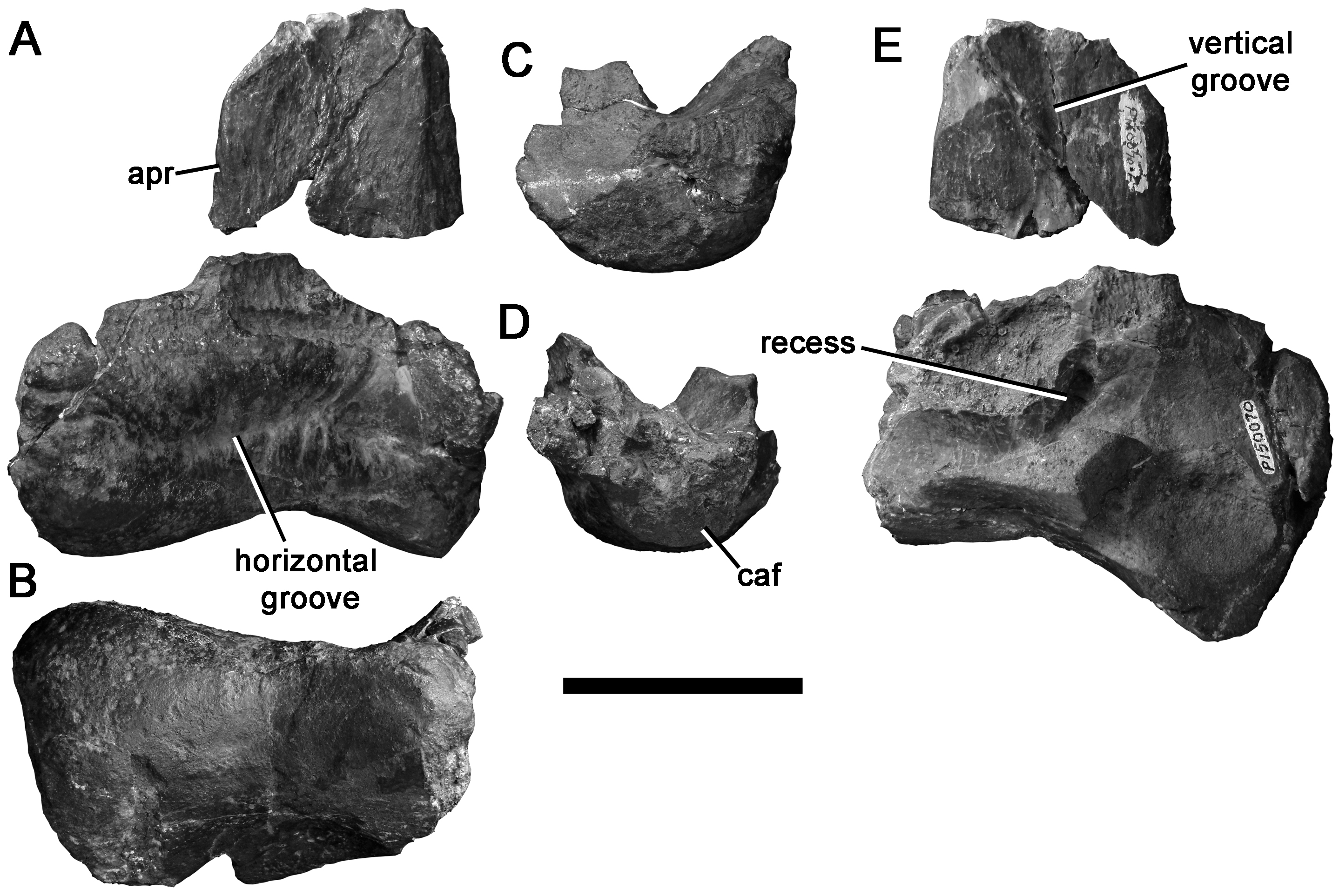
Specimen NMV P150070, known as "Allosaurus robustus"

"Allosaurus robustus" is an informal name used for specimen NMV P150070, a theropod astragalus discovered in the Early Cretaceous Wonthaggi Formation of Victoria, Australia. Initially assigned to Allosaurus, the specimen was later reconsidered by researches, with Samuel Welles suggesting that it belonged to an ornithomimid. In the early 2000s, Daniel Chure concluded that it did not represent a new species of Allosaurus, although an allosaurid affinity remained possible. Yoichi Azuma and Phil Currie noted similarities to the astragalus of Fukuiraptor. Other proposed identifications have included a relative of Australovenator and an abelisauroid. A 2019 study strongly supported classifying the specimen as a megaraptoran, the group that includes Fukuiraptor and Australovenator.

The name "Allosaurus robustus", first confined as a museum label, was first published by Chure in 2000.

=== Amargastegos ===
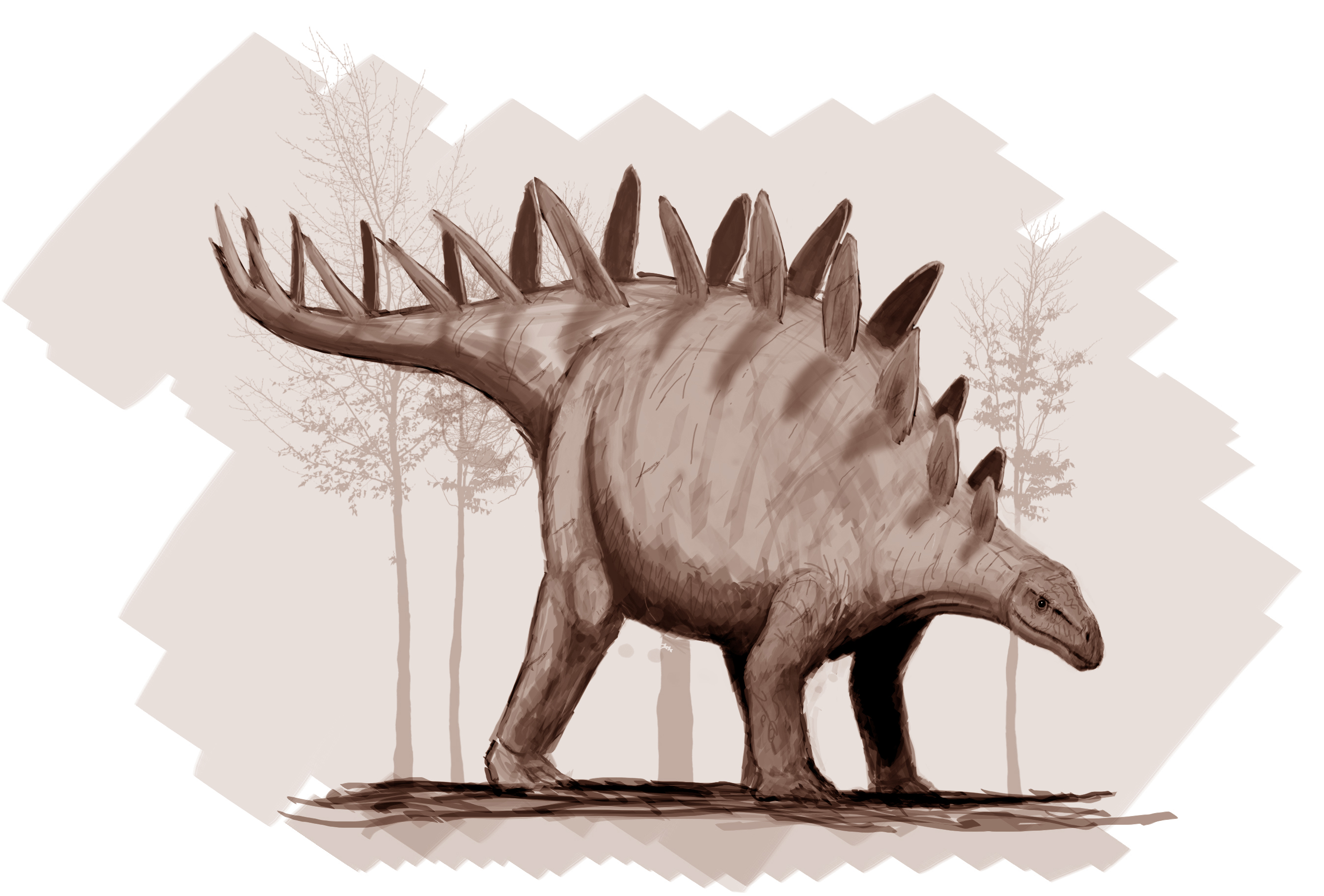
"Amargastegos" restoration

"Amargastegos" is an informal genus of extinct stegosaurid ornithischian dinosaur known from the La Amarga Formation of Argentina, named by Roman Ulansky in 2014 on the basis of MACN N-43 (some dorsal osteoderms, the cervical and caudal vertebrae, and one skull bone), and the type species is "A. brevicollum". In 2016, Peter Malcolm Galton and Kenneth Carpenter declared it a nomen nudum, establishing it as an indeterminate stegosaur.

=== Amphicoelias brontodiplodocus/Barackosaurus ===
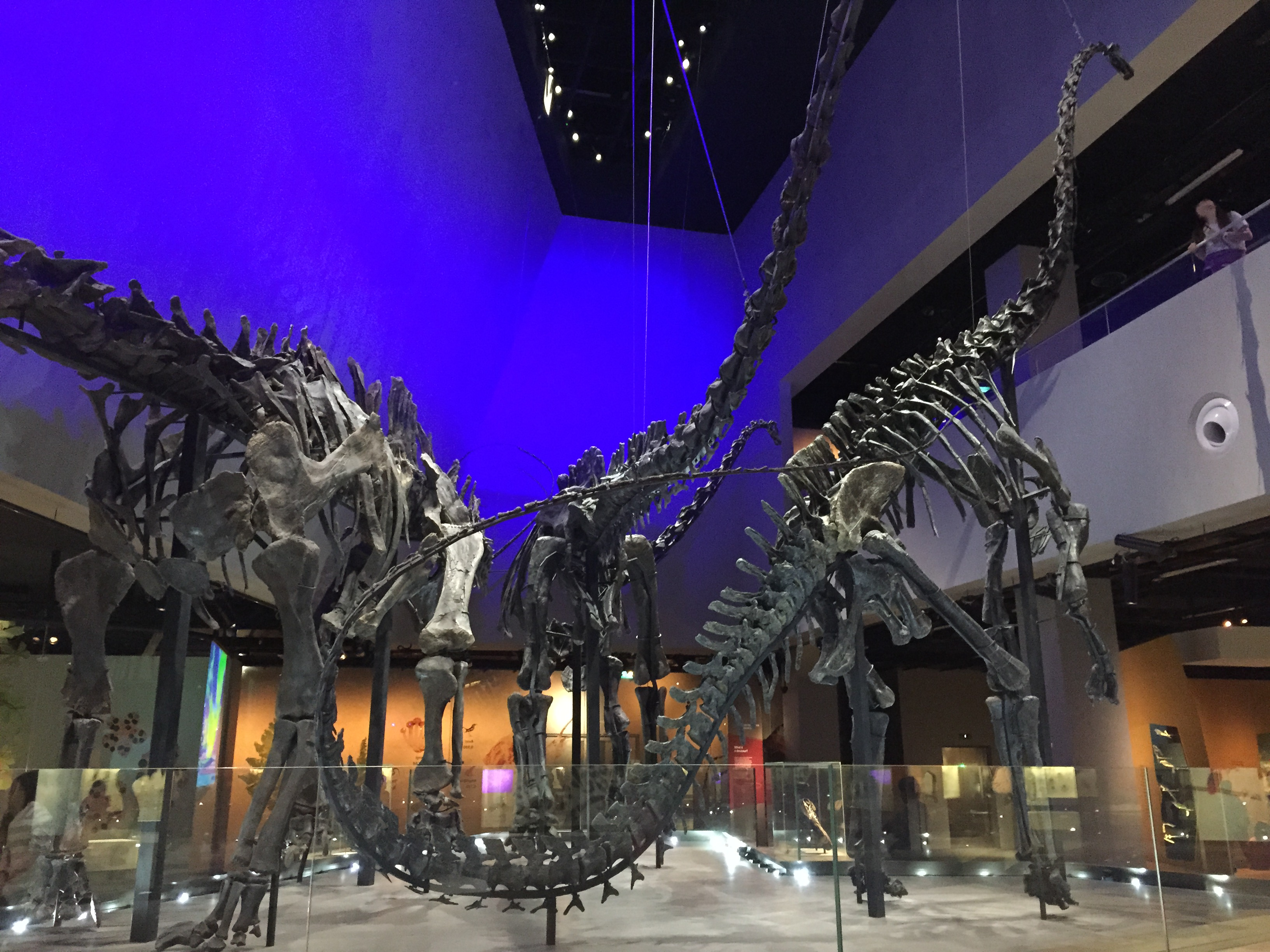
Three diplodocid skeletons informally dubbed "Amphicoelias brontodiplodocus", or "Barackosaurus", in 2010

"Barackosaurus" is the informal name created in 2010 which is used for a sauropod found in Kimmeridgian-aged sediments pertaining to the Morrison Formation, Wyoming. It was found in the Dana Quarry. "Barackosaurus" was supposedly 20 meters long and weighed 20 tons. In 2010, an article was made available, but not formally published, by Henry Galiano and Raimund Albersdorfer in which they dubbed the Dana Quarry specimens which had already been referred to as "Barackosaurus" as "Amphicoelias brontodiplodocus". The specific name referred to their hypothesis based on these specimens that nearly all Morrison diplodocid species are either growth stages or represent sexual dimorphism among members of the genus Amphicoelias, but this analysis was met with skepticism and the publication itself has been disclaimed by its lead author, explaining that it is "obviously a drafted manuscript complete with typos, etc., and not a final paper. In fact, no printing or distribution has been attempted". As of 2015, they are now on display at the Lee Kong Chian Natural History Museum in Singapore.

=== Andhrasaurus ===
"Andhrasaurus" is an informal genus of extinct armored ornithischian dinosaur from the Kota Formation of India. The proposed species is "A. indicus". Ulansky (2014) coined the name for skull elements, about 30 osteoderms, and the extremities of vertebrae and limbs, all preserved in the collections of the GSI and assigned to Ankylosauria by Nath et al. (2002). In 2016, Peter Malcolm Galton and Kenneth Carpenter noted that "Andhrasaurus" did not meet ICZN requirements and therefore declared it a nomen nudum, listing it as Thyreophora indet., while noting that the jawbones described by Nath et al. (2002) belonging to crocodylomorphs. The dermal armor informally named "Andhrasaurus" was redescribed by Galton (2019), referring the material to Ankylosauria.

=== Angeac ornithomimosaur ===
The "Angeac ornithomimosaur" is an informal name given to an unnamed theropod taxon known from the Early Cretaceous (Berriasian age) Angeac-Charente bonebed (part of the stratigraphy of the Aquitaine Basin) near Angeac-Charente in western France. The taxon is toothless and is known from numerous disarticulated remains representing at least 70 individuals covering almost all of the skeleton. Some remains were described by Allain et al. (2014). While it was originally regarded as an ornithomimosaur, Cau and Paterna (2025) suggested ceratosaurian affinities instead, closely allied with Bahariasaurus, Berthasaura, Ligabueino, and Limusaurus.

=== Angloposeidon ===
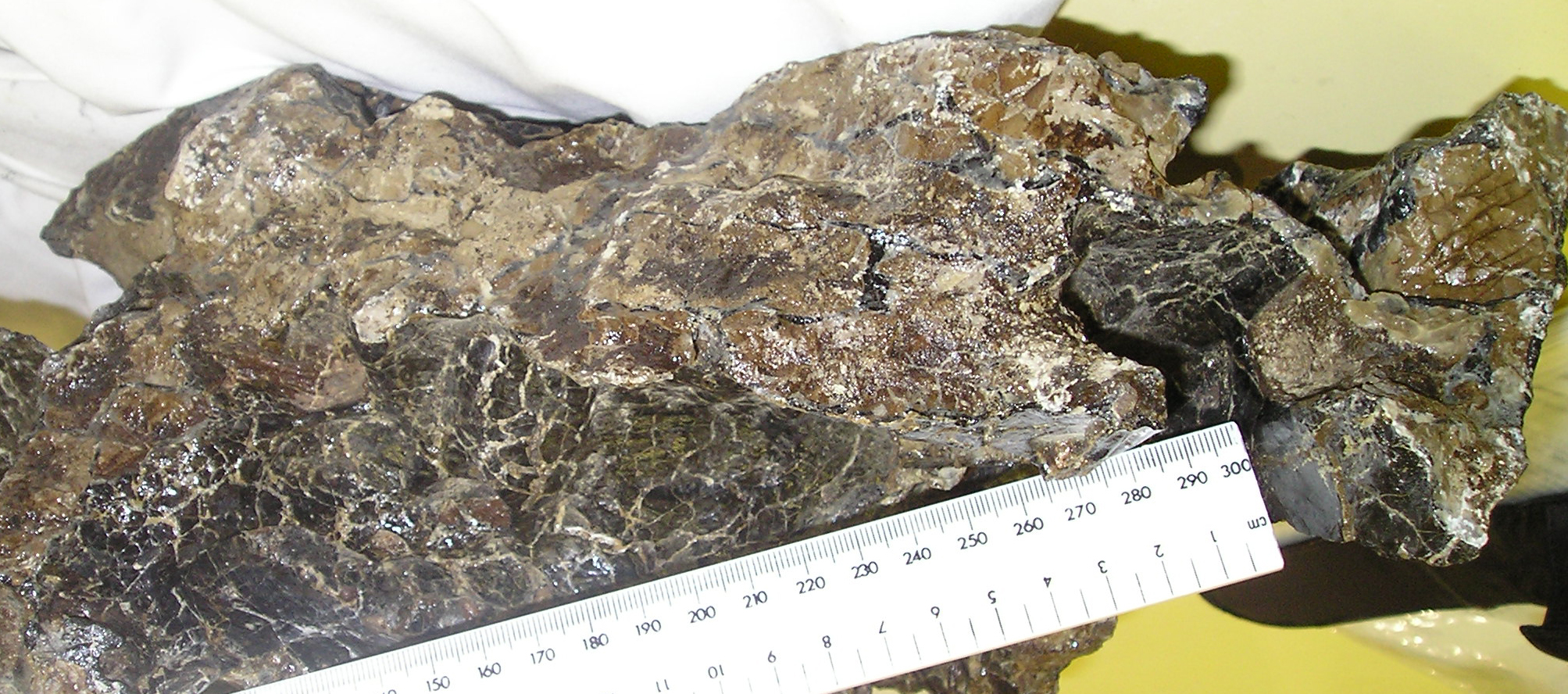
Pneumatic structures (vertebra) of "Angloposeidon"

"Angloposeidon" is the informal name given to a sauropod dinosaur from the Early Cretaceous (Barremian) Wessex Formation of the Isle of Wight in southern England. It was a possible brachiosaurid but has not been formally named. Darren Naish, a notable vertebrate palaeontologist, has worked with the specimen and has recommended that this name only be used informally and that it not be published. However, he published it himself in his book Tetrapod Zoology Book One from 2010. The remains consist of a single cervical vertebra (MIWG.7306), which indicate it was a very large animal, 20 metres or greater in length.

=== Angustungui ===
"Angustungui" is an informal genus of stegosaur from the Late Jurassic Qigu Formation in China. The intended type species is "A. qiketaiensis" and the holotype is specimen SS V16001 consisting of axial, pectoral girdle, pelvic girdle, limb, and armor elements, while the paratype is specimen SS V16002, consisting of a right coracoid and a right scapula. Both specimens were discovered in 2016 by Li Daqing at Qiketai, Shanshan County, and the name was first announced in a bioRxiv pre-print article in October 2024, where it was recovered as sister taxon of Loricatosaurus.

=== Archaeoraptor ===
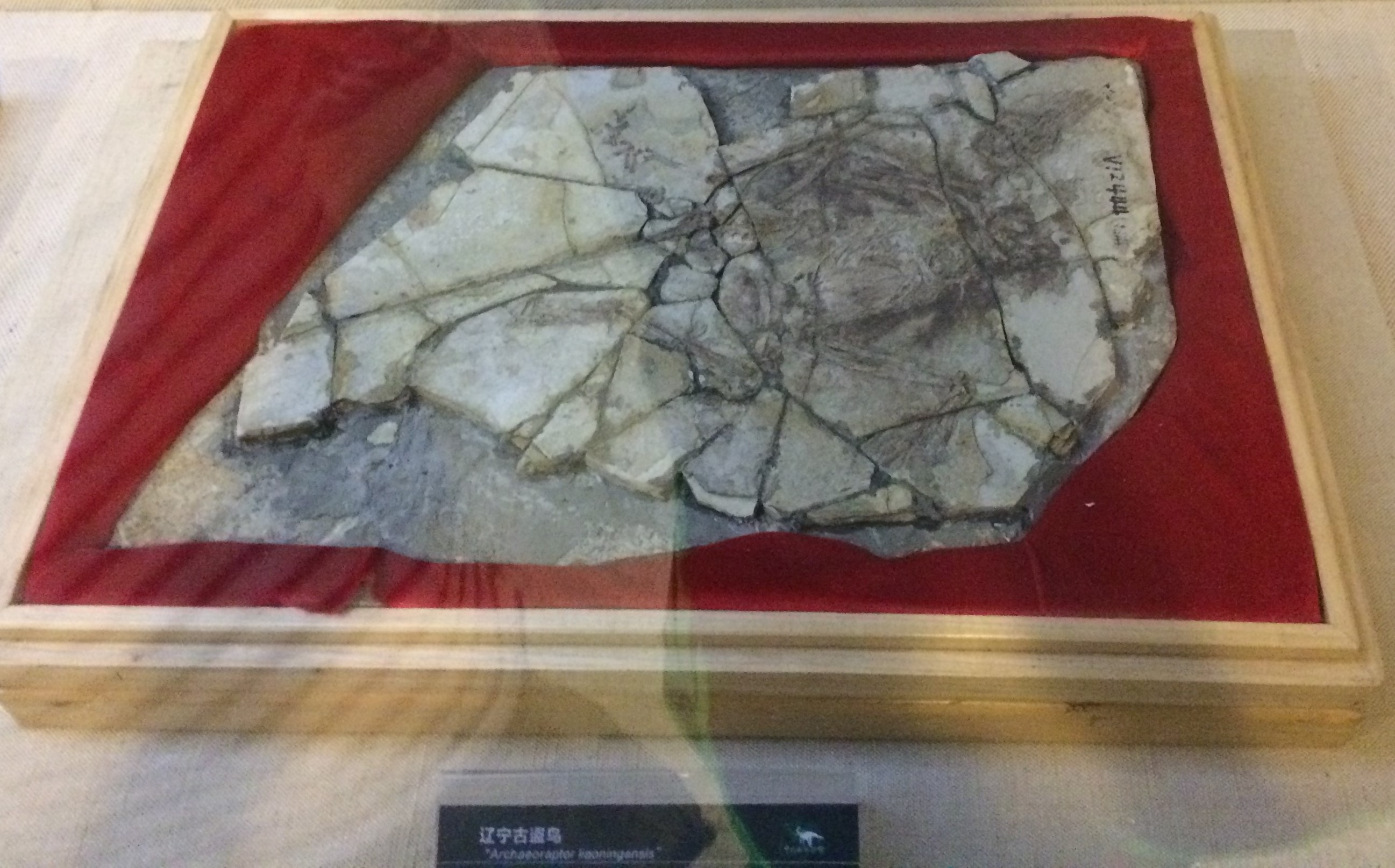
The "Archaeoraptor" fossil

"Archaeoraptor" is the informal generic name for a fossil from China, initially hailed as an important transitional fossil, that was later discovered to have been fabricated from multiple unrelated fossils. The name was created in an article published in National Geographic magazine in 1999, where the magazine claimed that the fossil was a "missing link" between birds and terrestrial theropod dinosaurs. Even prior to this publication there had been severe doubts about the fossil's authenticity. Further scientific study showed it to be a forgery constructed from rearranged pieces of real fossils from different species. Zhou et al. (2002) found that the head and upper body actually belong to a specimen of the primitive fossil bird Yanornis, while the tail is part of the holotype of Microraptor zhaoianus, a small winged dromaeosaur named in 2000. The legs and feet belong to an as yet unknown animal.

=== Archbishop ===
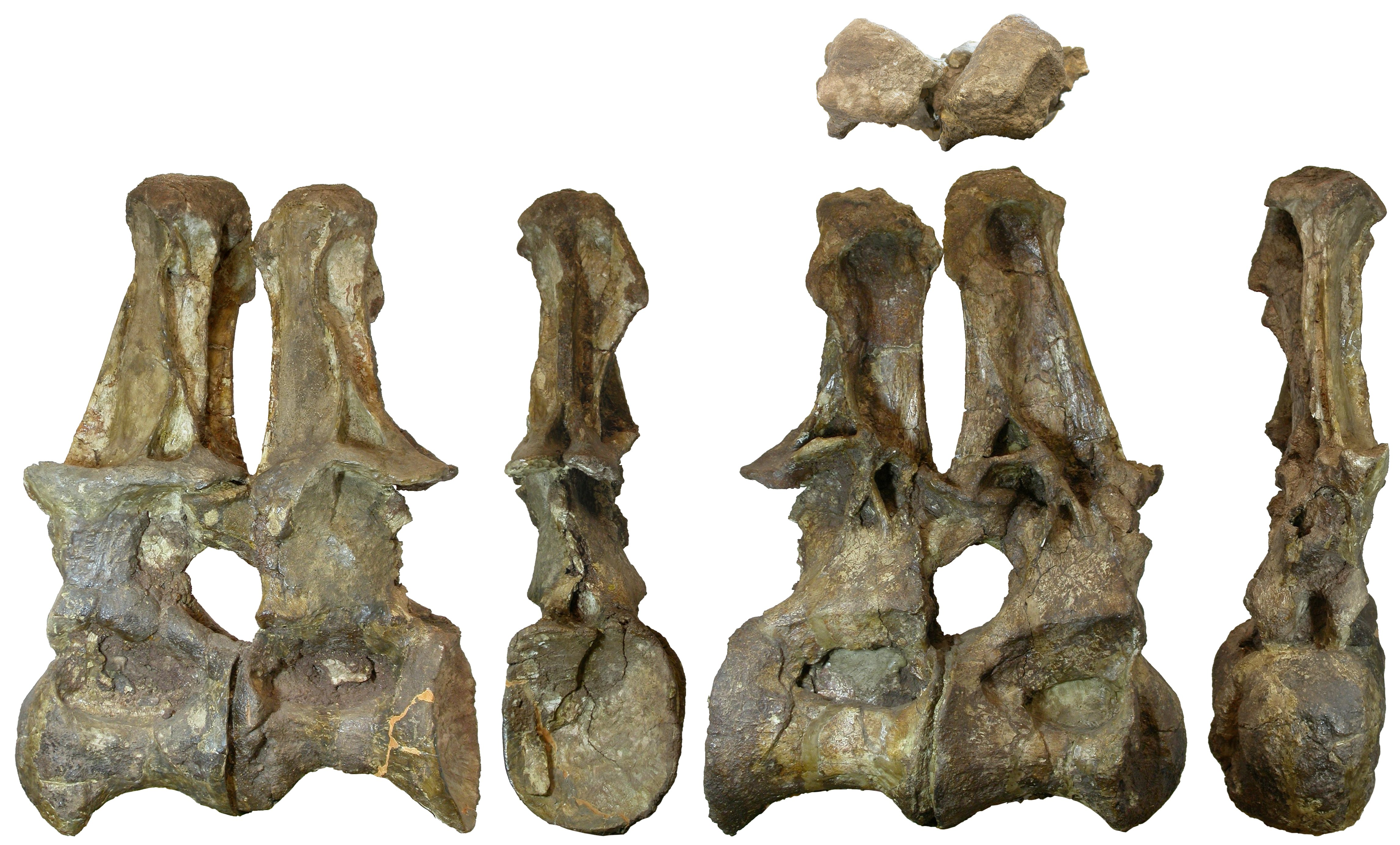
"The Archbishop" in multiple views

"The Archbishop" is a giant brachiosaurid sauropod dinosaur similar to Brachiosaurus and Giraffatitan. It was long considered a specimen of Brachiosaurus (now Giraffatitan) brancai due to being found in the same formation in Tendaguru, Tanzania. However, the "Archbishop" shows significant differences including a unique vertebral morphology and a proportionally longer neck, that indicates it is a different, previously unknown genus and species. It was discovered by Frederick Migeod in 1930. "The Archbishop" is a nickname that functions as a placeholder – the specimen currently has no scientific name. The specimen is currently housed in the Natural History Museum in London, and will eventually be re-described by Dr. Michael P. Taylor of Bristol University. In May 2018, Taylor started to work on describing the Archbishop.

=== Atlantohadros ===
"Atlantohadros", more commonly known as the "Merchantville hadrosaur", is an informally named hadrosaurid dinosaur that lived in the Merchantville Formation in the northeastern United States. Brownstein (2021) found "Atlantohadros" to be more derived than Tethyshadros but less derived than Saurolophinae and Lambeosaurinae. The name was intended to be used in that publication, but was cut for unknown reasons; initial versions of Brownstein (2021) contained the word "Atlantohadros" superimposed over "Merchantville Taxon" in a cladogram; subsequent corrections have erased the genus name entirely.

Three specimens were discovered 8 kilometres (5.0 mi) northwest of Freehold near Manalapan–Marlboro township line in Monmouth County during the 1970s. These are: YPM VPPU.021813, YPM VPPU.021813, and AMNH 13704, with YPM VPPU.021813 possibly belonging to the same individual as YPM VPPU.021813 due similar weathering, size, and the same horizon. These specimens consist of both coracoids, both scapulae, a femur, a fragmentary proximal tibia, and a dentary from a cast of the specimen (the original likely lost in YPM's catalogue) in the adult specimen, as well as a rib, a femur, and long bone portions in the juvenile. AMNH 13704 is a partial dentary of a probable perinate. Scattered bones associated with these include a quadrate, several partial maxilla portions, a partial jugal, skull roof fragments, and several rib fragments.

== B ==
=== Baguasaurus ===
"Baguasaurus" (meaning "Bagua lizard") is the informal name given to an as yet undescribed genus of lithostrotian sauropod dinosaur from the Late Cretaceous (Campanian – Maastrichtian-aged) Chota Formation of Peru. The proposed holotype, consisting of caudal vertebrae, was first mentioned in a review of the Chota Formation by Mourier et al. (1988), and the name "Baguasaurus" was coined by Larramendi & Molina Pérez (2020). "Baguasaurus" was estimated to be 12 metres (39 ft) long and weighed 4 tonnes (8,800 lb).

=== Balochisaurus ===
"Balochisaurus" (meaning "Balochi lizard", for the Baloch tribes of Pakistan) is an informal taxon of titanosaurian sauropod dinosaur from the Late Cretaceous of Pakistan. The proposed species is "B. malkani". The discovery was made (along with other dinosaur specimens) in 2001 near Vitariki by a team of paleontologists from the Geological Survey of Pakistan. Described in 2006 by M.S. Malkani, the genus is based on seven tail vertebrae found in the Maastrichtian-age Vitakri Member of the Pab Formation, with additional vertebrae and a partial skull assigned to it. Balochisaurus was assigned to the family "Balochisauridae" along with "Marisaurus". It was considered invalid by Wilson, Barrett, and Carrano (2011).

=== Barnes High Sauropod ===
The "Barnes High sauropod" is the informal name given to MIWG-BP001, an undescribed sauropod dinosaur specimen from the Wessex Formation on the Isle of Wight. It was discovered in the cliffs around Barnes High in 1992 and is currently owned by the privately run unaccredited Dinosaur Farm Museum near Brighstone; the ownership situation was described as "complex" and the specimen is currently inaccessible to researchers. It is roughly 40% complete and consists of a "Partial postcranial skeleton, including presacral vertebrae, anterior caudal vertebrae, girdle and limb elements", including a largely complete forelimb. It has been suggested to be a brachiosaurid and is possibly synonymous with the earlier named Eucamerotus due to similarities with the vertebrae.

=== Bayosaurus ===
"Bayosaurus" is the informal name given to an as yet undescribed genus of theropod dinosaur. The name was coined by paleontologists Rodolfo Coria, Philip J. Currie, and Paulina Carabajal in 2006. It apparently was an abelisauroid from the Turonian Cerro Lisandro Formation of Neuquén, Argentina, around 4 m (13 ft) long. The specimen is MCF-PVPH-237, including dorsal and sacral vertebrae, a fragmentary pelvis, and other partial bones, which were discovered in 2000. The name was used in a phylogenetic analysis to indicate the position of MCF-PVPH-237.

=== Beelemodon ===
"Beelemodon" is the informal name given to an undescribed theropod genus from the Late Jurassic, possibly belonging to a coelurosaur. The fossils include two teeth found in Wyoming, United States. The name appeared in print in 1997, when paleontologist Robert T. Bakker mentioned it in a symposium for the Academy of Natural Sciences. The teeth are most similar to Compsognathus, but have no unique features and also share similarities with Protarchaeopteryx and dromaeosaurids.

=== Biconcavoposeidon ===
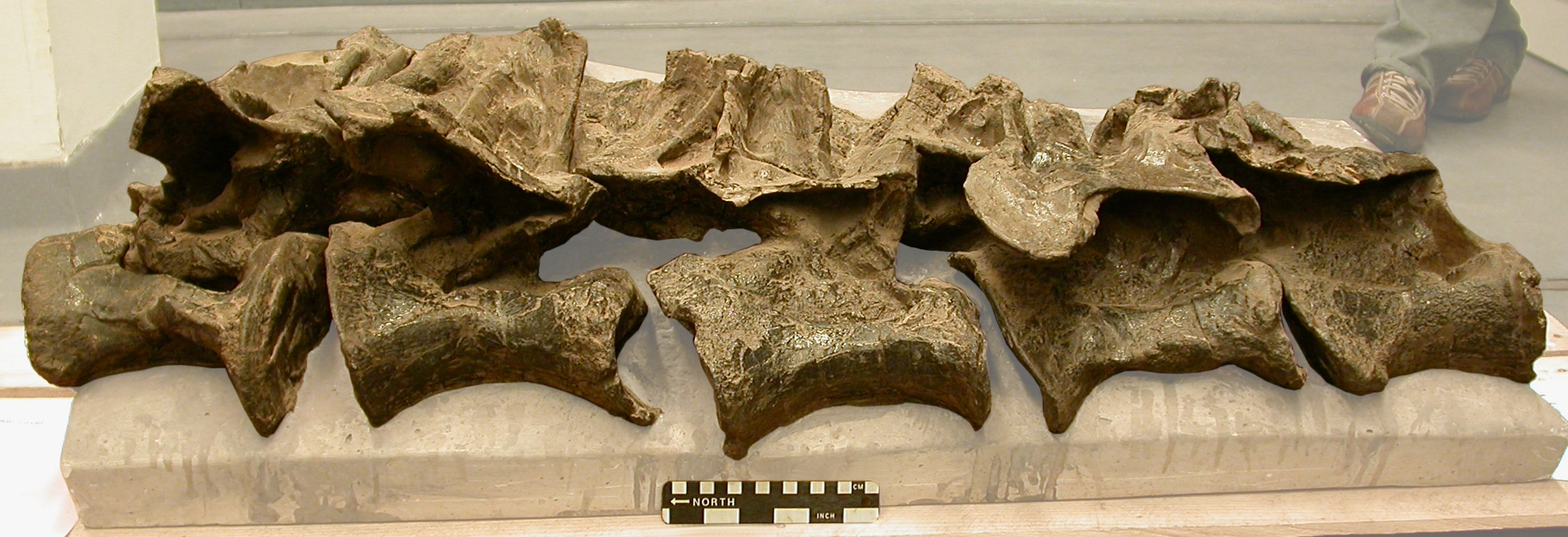
"Biconcavoposeidon" vertebrae

"Biconcavoposeidon" is the placeholder name for AMNH FARB 291, five consecutive posterior dorsal vertebrae of a brachiosaurid sauropod, from the Late Jurassic Morrison Formation, Wyoming. Not much else is currently known about "Biconcaveoposeidon", except that it was discovered in the Bone Cabin quarry in 1898.

=== Bihariosaurus ===
"Bihariosaurus" (meaning "Bihor lizard") is an invalid genus of iguanodontian dinosaur from Early Cretaceous Bauxite of Cornet, Romania. The type species, "Bihariosaurus bauxiticus", was named but not described by Marinescu in 1989. It was similar to Camptosaurus, and was an iguanodont. The original publication of the taxon did not include sufficient description, and the illustrations cannot distinguish it from any other ornithopod.

=== Biscoveosaurus ===
"Biscoveosaurus" is the informal name of an ornithopod dinosaur specimen from the Early Maastrichtian age Snow Hill Island Formation of James Ross Island, Antarctica. It comes from the Cape Lamb Member of the formation, the same member as Morrosaurus, another basal ornithopod. As such, it has been suggested that it may be a secondary specimen of that species, but as the holotype of Morrosaurus is fragmentary and does not overlap with the material of "Biscoveosaurus", this cannot yet be tested. The specimen consists of dentaries, teeth, a braincase, parts of the maxillae, forelimb elements, assorted vertebrae, and the pectoral girdle; this makes it unique compared to the other James Ross Island ornithopods, which do not have both cranial and postcranial remains. It has been estimated the animal would have been about 4–5 metres (13–16 ft) in length.

== C ==
=== Capitalsaurus ===
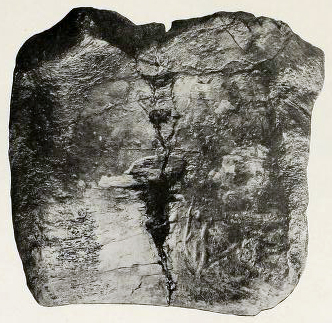
"Capitalsaurus" vertebra

"Capitalsaurus" is the informal genus name given to a caudal (tail) vertebra belonging to a large theropod dinosaur that lived during the Early Cretaceous. It was discovered on 28 January 1898, by construction workers excavating a sewer at the intersection of Washington, D.C.'s First and F Streets SE. The only known specimen, it was assigned two different species designations – Creosaurus potens and Dryptosaurus potens – and eventually overturned each time. In the 1990s, the paleontologist Peter Kranz asserted that it represented a unique type of dinosaur and assigned it the name "Capitalsaurus". He successfully campaigned through local schools to make "Capitalsaurus" the official dinosaur of Washington, D.C., which became law in 1998. A year later, the district further recognized F Street at the discovery site as Capitalsaurus Court. It designated 28 January 2001 as Capitalsaurus Day.

=== Changdusaurus ===
"Changdusaurus" (also known as "Changtusaurus") is the informal name given to a genus of dinosaur from the Late Jurassic Period. It lived in what is now China. "Changdusaurus" is classified as a stegosaurid. The type species was named "Changdusaurus laminoplacodus" by Zhao in 1983, but it has never been formally described, and remains a nomen nudum. One source indicates the fossils have been lost.

=== Cinizasaurus ===
"Cinizasaurus" is a nomen ex dissertationae for fossilized remains from the Late Triassic of New Mexico that were initially interpreted as belonging to a theropod dinosaur. The intended type species "Cinizasaurus hunti" was named in an unpublished 1997 thesis based on NMMNH P-18400, which consists of a tibia, vertebrae, and other fragments. In 2007, Nesbitt, Irmis, and Parker classified both NMMNH P-18400 and NMMNH P-18401 as specimens of an indeterminate archosauriform.

=== Comanchesaurus ===
"Comanchesaurus" is a nomen ex dissertationae for fossilized remains from the Late Triassic of New Mexico that were initially interpreted as belonging to a theropod dinosaur. The remains, NMMNH P-4569, consist of a partial skeleton including vertebral centra and hindlimb bones, and came from the Norian-age Upper Triassic Bull Canyon Formation of Guadalupe County. Adrian Hunt, in his unpublished dissertation, proposed the name "Comanchesaurus kuesi" for the specimen, but the name was never adopted, and was first referred to in the scientific literature in a 2007 redescription of Late Triassic North American material thought to belong to dinosaurs (Nesbitt, Irmis, and Parker, 2007). In the redescription, the authors found the material to belong to a "possible indeterminate saurischian".

=== Cryptoraptor ===
"Cryptoraptor" is a nomen ex dissertationae for fossilized remains from the Late Triassic of New Mexico that were initially interpreted as belonging to a theropod dinosaur. The remains, NMMNH P-17375, consist of a partial skeleton including partial hindlimb and pelvic bones, and came from the Norian-age Upper Triassic Bull Canyon Formation of Quay County. Adrian Hunt, in his unpublished dissertation, proposed the name "Cryptoraptor lockleyi" for the specimen, but the name was never adopted, and was first referred to in the scientific literature in a 2007 redescription of Late Triassic North American material thought to belong to dinosaurs. In the redescription, the authors found the material to belong to an intermediate archosaur, as no features exclusive to dinosaurs could be identified.

=== Cryptotyrannus ===
"Cryptotyrannus" (meaning "secret/hidden tyrant"), more commonly known as the "Merchantville tyrannosauroid", is an informally named tyrannosauroid dinosaur that lived in the Merchantville Formation. It was informally named by Brownstein (2021), who found it to be the sister taxon of Dryptosaurus, reinstating Dryptosauridae. The name appeared in the initial version of Brown's paper, superimposed over "Merchantville Taxon" in a cladogram; a subsequent correction has erased the name entirely.

"Cryptotyrannus" is known from two specimens discovered during the 1970s, the holotype YPM VPPU.021795 and the paratype YPM VPPU.022416. Similar coloration and weathering indicate that these are probably the same individual. These are a partial foot bone and one caudal vertebrae. However, a skeletal produced for the paper depicts a hand claw. The foot morphology is consistent with tyrannosaurs, being extremely similar to the Dryptosaurus aquilunguis. Autapomorphies include a metatarsal IV that is far more gracile and IV in proximal view also has a triangular, rather than subrectangular, outline. The holotype was once tentatively assigned to "Coelosaurus" antiquus. Shark bites present on the holotype suggest that the specimen's fragmentary nature is due to predation or scavenging by marine predators.

== D ==
=== Dachongosaurus ===
"Dachongosaurus" is the informal name given to an undescribed genus of sauropod dinosaur from the Early Jurassic of China. It is known from fossils including at least a partial articulated skeleton from the Dark Red Beds of the Lower Lufeng Series (Sinemurian stage) in Yunnan. Possibly a cetiosaur, the "type species" is "Dachongosaurus yunnanensis", coined by Zhao in 1985. An alternate spelling is "Dachungosaurus". As with other informal names coined by Zhao in 1983 and 1985, nothing has since been published, and the remains may have been redescribed under another name.

=== Damalasaurus ===
"Damalasaurus" (meaning "Damala lizard") is the informal name given to a genus of herbivorous dinosaur from the Early Jurassic. It was a sauropod, though its exact classification within the clade is unknown. Fossils of "Damalasaurus", including a rib, have been found in the Middle Daye Group of Tibet. Species attributed to this genus include "Damalasaurus laticostalis" and "D. magnus", although it is possible that both names refer to the same species.

=== Dongshengosaurus ===
"Dongshengosaurus" is the informal name given to an undescribed genus of iguanodontian dinosaur from the Early Cretaceous of Liaoning, China. The intended type species, "D. sinensis", was named by Pan Rui in his 2009 thesis. It is known from a partial juvenile skeleton discovered from the Yixian Formation.

=== Dubeynarainsaurus ===
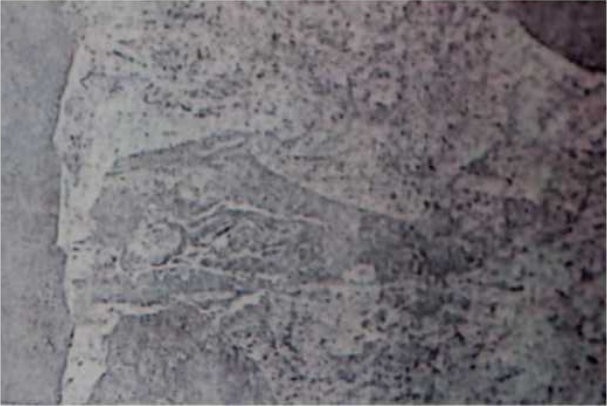
Proposed holotype of "D. sahni" as seen in 1946

"Dubeynarainsaurus" is an informal genus of purported theropod dinosaurs from the Late Cretaceous Lameta Formation of India described by Malkani (2025) in Scientific Research Publishing, a known predatory publisher. The proposed holotype is allegedly a partial dentary with associated teeth, collected in January 1944 by V. S. Dubey and Kedar Narain (who are referenced in the proposed genus name). The intended type species is "Dubeynarainsaurus sahni." The specimen was initially identified as a pterosaur mandible in 1946.

=== Duranteceratops ===
"Duranteceratops" is a purported new taxon of chasmosaurine ceratopsid from the Hell Creek Formation. In 2012, a ceratopsid skull supposedly distinguishable from Triceratops was unearthed in South Dakota by a fossil poacher named John Carter. Though it has yet to be published, according to the Prehistoric Times issue no. 121 from Spring 2017, the specimen is to be named "Duranteceratops".

== E ==
=== Echizensaurus ===
"Echizensaurus" is an informal genus of ornithischian dinosaur from Echizen, Japan which lived during the Late Cretaceous. It has been assigned to Ceratopsia incertae sedis in paleontologist Lida Xing's homepage.

=== EK troodontid ===
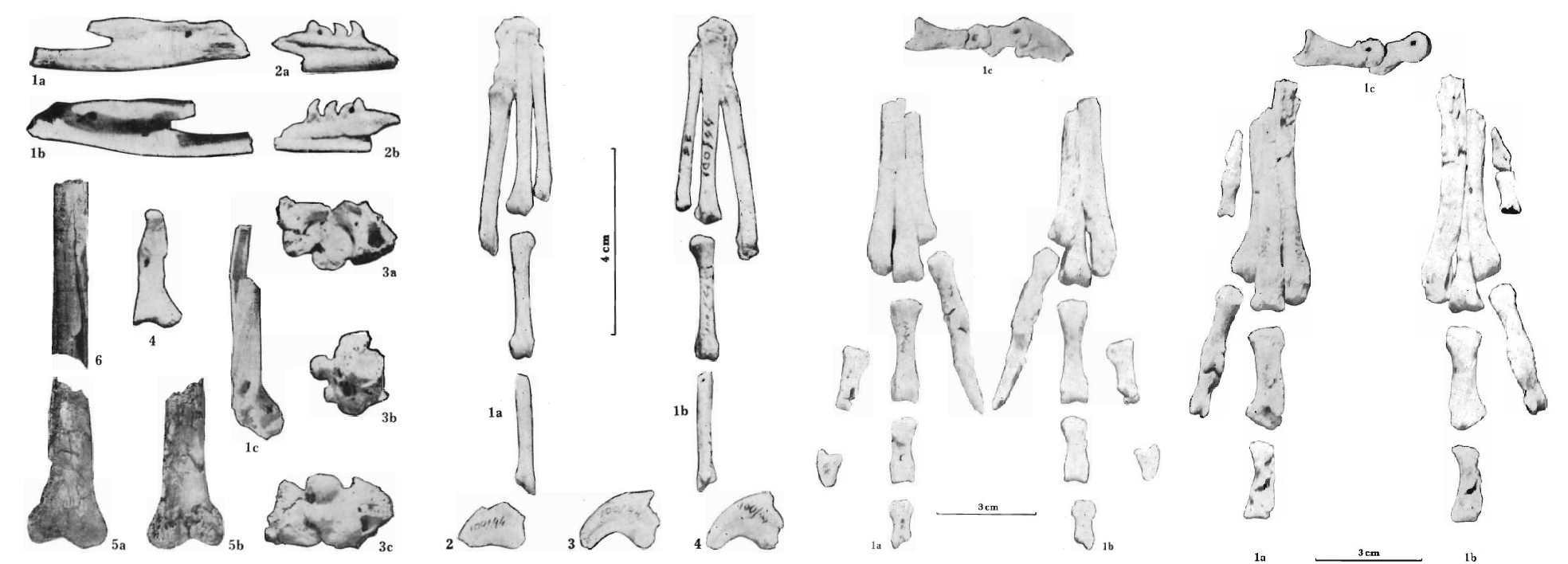
Known remains of SPS 100/44

The "EK troodontid" (specimen SPS 100/44) is an unnamed genus of troodontid dinosaur discovered in Mongolia. In the scientific literature it is referred to as the "EK troodontid", after the Early Cretaceous sediments in which it was found. SPS 100/44 was discovered by Sergei Mikhailovich Kurzanov during the 1979 Soviet-Mongolian Paleontological Expedition. It was found in deposits of the Barunbayaskaya Svita at the Khamareen Us locality, Dornogov (southeastern Gobi Desert), in the Mongolian People's Republic. SPS 100/44 was described by Rinchen Barsbold and colleagues in 1987.

Its fossil remains include an incomplete skeleton consisting of the braincase, posterior parts of the lower mandibles, a maxillary fragment with teeth, parts of five cervical vertebrae (cervicals ?2-?6), an articulated right manus with partial semilunate, left manus phalanx I-1, distal end of the left femur, and fragmentary left and right pedes. Barsbold pointed out that the specimen was smaller and from older sediments than other known troodontids, but it had some features of the skull that could have made it a juvenile. Barsbold also indicated the high degree of fusion of the bones of the skull and the unusual foot morphology to indicate that it might be an adult of an unknown taxon. Barsbold took the conservative position and did not name this specimen because it was not complete enough to rule out the possibility that it was a juvenile of a known genus of troodontid. Barsbold also noted that the naturally articulated manus of SPS 100/44 showed no signs of an opposable third digit, as was suggested for Troodon by Russell and Seguin in 1982. Turner and colleagues, in 2007, found the EK troodontid to be a distinct basal genus of troodontid, in a polytomy with Jinfengopteryx and a clade of more derived troodontids.

=== Eoplophysis ===
"Eoplophysis" is a genus of stegosaur known from the Middle Jurassic Cornbrash Formation, Sharp's Hill Formation, and Chipping Norton Formation of England. It was originally named Omosaurus vetustus by the renowned German paleontologist Friedrich von Huene. The holotype, OUM J.14000, is a 60-centimetre-long (2 ft) right femur of a juvenile individual from the Middle Jurassic (upper Bathonian) Cornbrash Formation of Oxfordshire, England, although it was probably reworked from the slightly older Forest Marble Formation in view of its eroded nature. Because of the renaming of Omosaurus, an occupied name, as Dacentrurus, O. vetustus was renamed into Dacentrurus vetustus in 1964. In the 1980s, researcher Peter Malcolm Galton reviewed all known stegosaur material from the Bathonian of England and concluded that Omosaurus vetustus was valid and should be tentatively referred to Lexovisaurus. However, the species was later considered a nomen dubium in both reviews of Stegosauria. In their alpha-taxonomic review of stegosaurs, Susannah Maidment and her colleagues noted that OUM J.14000 shares characters present in both sauropods and stegosaurs, but that it lacks synapomorphies exclusive to Stegosauria and assigned it as a Dinosauria indet. Nevertheless, the amateur paleontologist Roman Ulansky coined the new genus "Eoplophysis" ("Dawn Armed Form") for O. vetustus, noting differences with the femora of other stegosaurs.

=== Eugongbusaurus ===
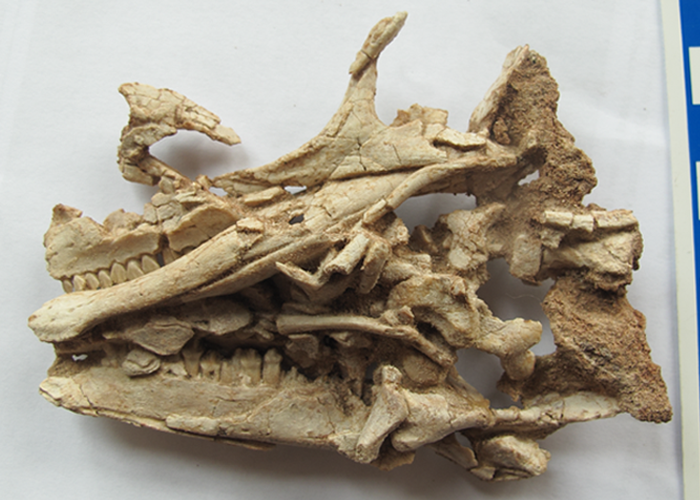
"Eugongbusaurus" skull IVPP 14559

"Eugongbusaurus" is the informal name (nomen nudum) proposed for a neornithischian found in the Oxfordian-age Shishugou Formation of Xinjiang, China. The intended type species, "Gongbusaurus" wucaiwanensis, was described by Dong Zhiming in 1989 for two partial skeletons as a second species of the poorly known tooth taxon Gongbusaurus. Fragmentary skeleton IVPP 8302, the type specimen for the new species, included a partial lower jaw, three tail vertebrae, and a partial forelimb. The second specimen, IVPP 8303, consisted of two hip vertebrae, eight tail vertebrae, and two complete hind limbs. Dong estimated it as around 1.3 to 1.5 meters (4.3 to 4.9 ft) long, and considered it to be a strong runner. He assigned the genus Gongbusaurus to the Hypsilophodontidae, a paraphyletic grade of small herbivorous bipedal dinosaurs. Because dinosaur teeth are generally not distinctive enough to hold a name, it is unsurprising that other paleontologists have suggested removing "G." wucaiwanensis from Gongbusaurus and giving it its own genus. The possible replacement name "Eugongbusaurus" leaked out accidentally and remains informal.

== F ==
=== Fendusaurus ===
"Fendusaurus" is a nomen ex dissertatione proposed by Fedak (2006) for FGM 998GF13-II, which includes a skull. Other specimens referred to "Fendusaurus" are FGM998GF13-I, FGM998GF13-III, FGM998GF69, FGM998GF9, and FGM998GF18, all found by a crew from the Princeton University. All the specimens include femora and coracoids, and although they each share slightly different features, the differences are credited to intra-specific variation. Known specimens of "Fendusaurus" were previously classified as cf. Ammosaurus. The femora and coracoids also help identify different individuals, and Timothy J. Fedak, the describer of the specimens, found that each block represented about one individual. "Fendusaurus" is known from the Early Jurassic (Hettangian) McCoy Brook Formation of Wasson Bluff, Nova Scotia. It is the first non-avian dinosaur from Nova Scotia. As five specimens of "Fendusaurus" are from the McCoy Brook Formation, the formation is the richest prosauropod site in North America. The formation is also similar to other formations of North America and Asia, as it lacks any remains presently assigned to Anchisaurus. Fedak places "Fendusaurus" as a genus of the family Massospondylidae.

The specimens of "Fendusaurus" include mostly crushed vertebrae, along with appendicular elements. They are distinguishable from Anchisaurus by the morphology of both the ilium and sacral vertebrae. However, in some specimens, the morphology of the femora and coracoids are quite different, which led Fedak to speculate that more than one species may have been present. "Fendusaurus", according to Fedak, can be distinguished from all closely related sauropodomorphs by the extreme elongation of the cervical vertebrae, a four vertebrae sacrum that includes a dorsosacral and caudosacral, the elongate postacetabular process of the ilium, and an expanded anterior distal process of the tibia.

=== Ferganastegos ===
"Ferganastegos" is a dubious genus of stegosaur from the Middle Jurassic (Callovian) Balabansai Formation of Fergana Valley, Kyrgyzstan. The holotype of "Ferganastegos callovicus", IGB 001, consists of four posterior dorsal vertebrae. Although Averianov et al. did not consider the vertebrae diagnostic to genus, the freelance Russian dinosaur enthusiast and amateur paleontologist Roman Ulansky decided that the differences between IGB 001 and other stegosaurs were sufficient to warrant a binomial for IGB 001, "Ferganastegos callovicus" (Callovian roof from Fergana Valley), despite the fact he did not examine the material himself. Other researchers still contend that the material is not diagnostic and that the genus is a nomen dubium.

=== Ferropectis ===
"Ferropectis" is a nodosaurid ankylosaur from the Late Cretaceous (Cenomanian) Eagle Ford Group in Texas, United States that was named in a 2018 dissertation by Matt Clemens. The intended type species is "Ferropectis brysorum", and in the phylogenetic analysis it was placed as the sister taxon to Borealopelta in a clade including Hungarosaurus, Europelta, and Pawpawsaurus.

=== Francoposeidon ===
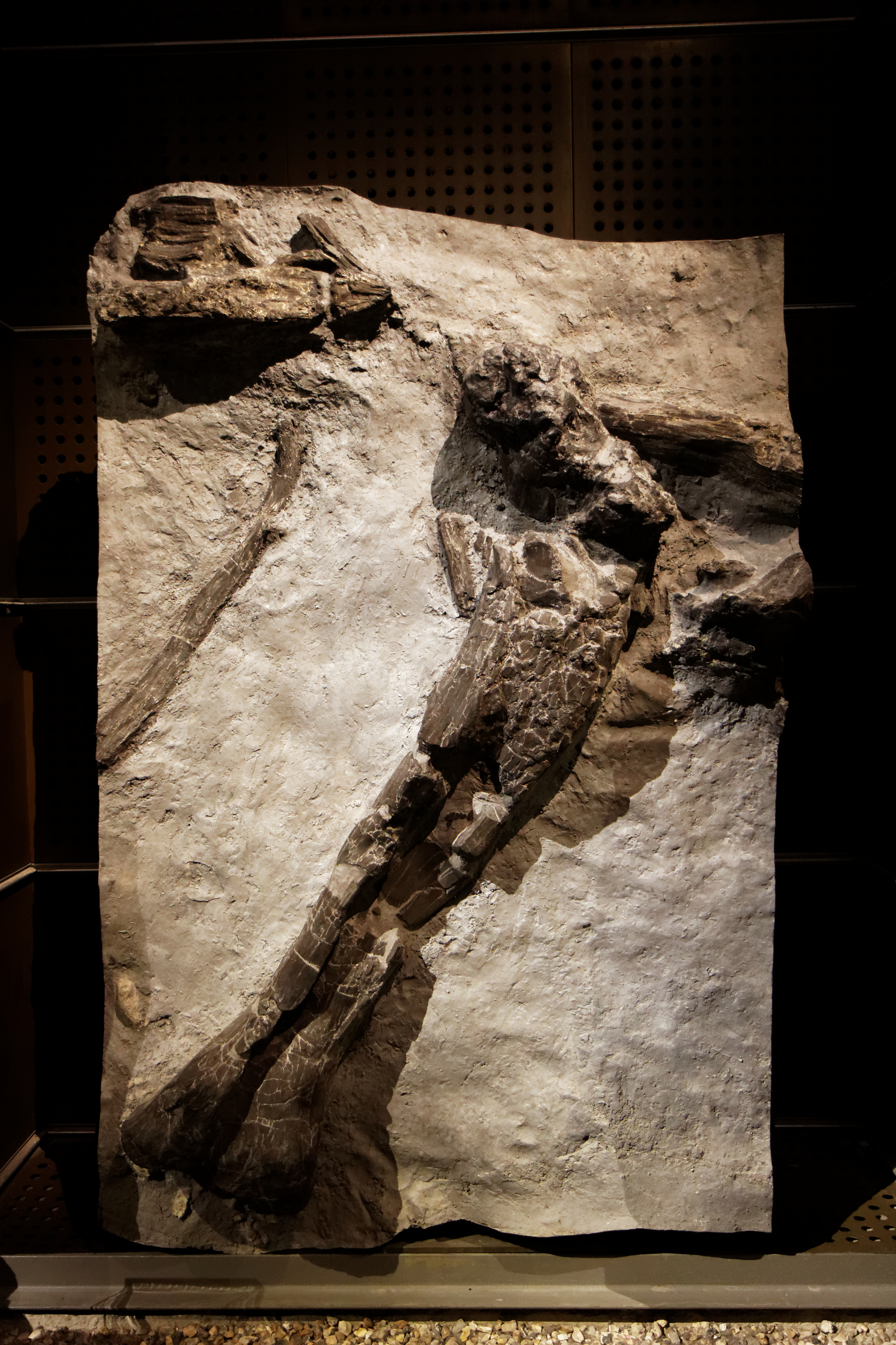
Femur, vertebra and a rib of "Francoposeidon"

"Francoposeidon" (meaning "French earthquake god") is the informal name given to an as yet undescribed genus of turiasaurian sauropod dinosaur from the Early Cretaceous (Hauterivian)-aged Angeac-Charente bonebed of France. The proposed type species is "F. charantensis", and the remains consist of a "braincase, some skull bones, teeth, cervical, dorsal and caudal vertebrae, chevrons, pelvic girdle, and all the limb bones" alongside isolated teeth, belonging to at least 7 individuals. The length of the femur was measured to be around 2.35 metres (7.7 ft), (± 0.5 metres (1.6 ft)), making "Francoposeidon" one of the largest known sauropods discovered in Europe.

=== Futabasaurus ===
"Futabasaurus" is an informal name for a genus of theropod dinosaur from the Late Cretaceous of Japan, known only from a partial shin bone of ~56 millimetres (2.2 in) wide that was discovered in the Coniacian-age Ashizawa Formation of the Futaba Group; it was likely around 2 metres (6.6 ft) when fully grown. It was first mentioned as "Futaba-ryu" by Hasegawa et al. (1987), and the name was coined by David Lambert in 1990 as a conversion from the Japanese nickname "Futaba-ryu", for an undescribed theropod. Dong Zhiming and coauthors briefly discussed the fossil shin bone it was based on that same year, publishing a photograph. They considered the bone to belong to an indeterminate tyrannosaurid. If the specimen is eventually described and named, it will require a different name, because the name Futabasaurus has since been used for a genus of plesiosaur.

== G ==
=== Gadolosaurus ===
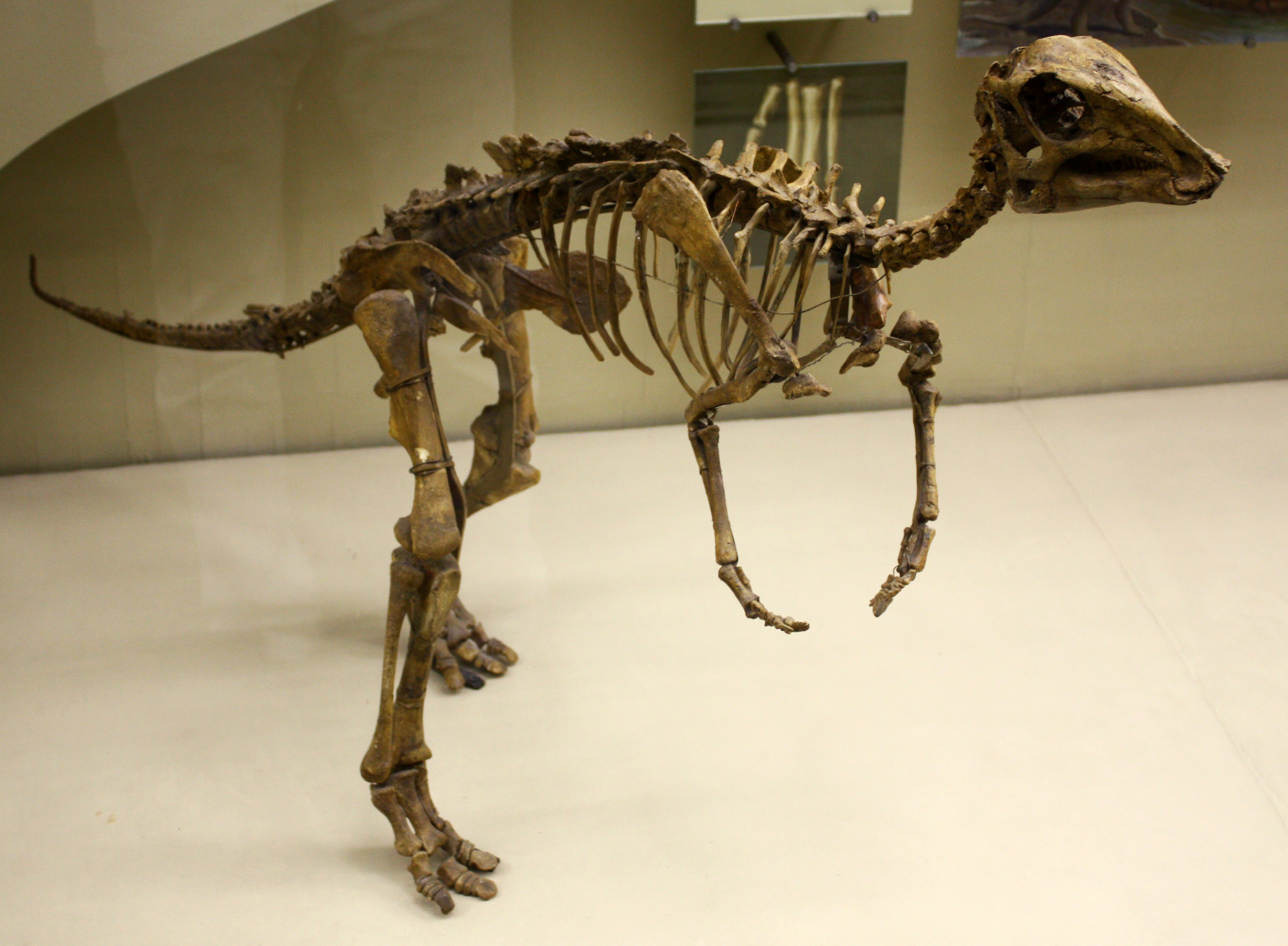
Skeleton of "Gadolosaurus"

"Gadolosaurus" is an informal name given to PIN, no. 3458/5 an unnamed juvenile hadrosauroid dinosaur specimen from the Bayan Shireh Formation of Baishan Tsav, Mongolia. The name "Gadolosaurus" was first used in a 1979 book by Japanese paleontologist Tsunemasa Saito, in a caption for a photo of the specimen. This specimen represents an individual that was only about a meter long (39 inches). The specimen was part of a Soviet exhibition of fossils in Japan. Apparently, the name comes from a Japanese phonetic translation of the Cyrillic word gadrosavr, or hadrosaur, and was never meant by the Russians to establish a new generic name.

Despite the only name ever applied to it being merely a mistranslation of gadrosavr, this specimen has appeared in many popular dinosaur books, with varying identifications. Donald F. Glut in 1982 reported it as either an iguanodont or hadrosaur, with no crest or boot on the ischium (the lack of which are both characteristics of the crested lambeosaurine duckbills), and suggested it could be the juvenile of a previously named genus like Tanius or Shantungosaurus. David Lambert in 1983 classified it as an iguanodont, but changed his mind by 1990, when it was listed as a synonym of Arstanosaurus without comment. What may be the same animal is mentioned but not named by David B. Norman and Hans-Dieter Sues in a 2000 book on Mesozoic reptiles from Mongolia and the former USSR; this material, from the Soviet-Mongolian expeditions of the 1970s, had been listed as Arstanosaurus in the Russian Academy of Sciences, and was found in the Cenomanian-age Bayan Shireh Formation of Baishin Tsav.

Averianov, Lopatin, and Tsogtbaatar in 2022 provided a preliminary description of this specimen and its taxonomic position, finding that the specimen may represent a juvenile of a novel taxon that was closely related to but more derived than the contemporary hadrosauroid Gobihadros.

=== Gallimimus mongoliensis ===
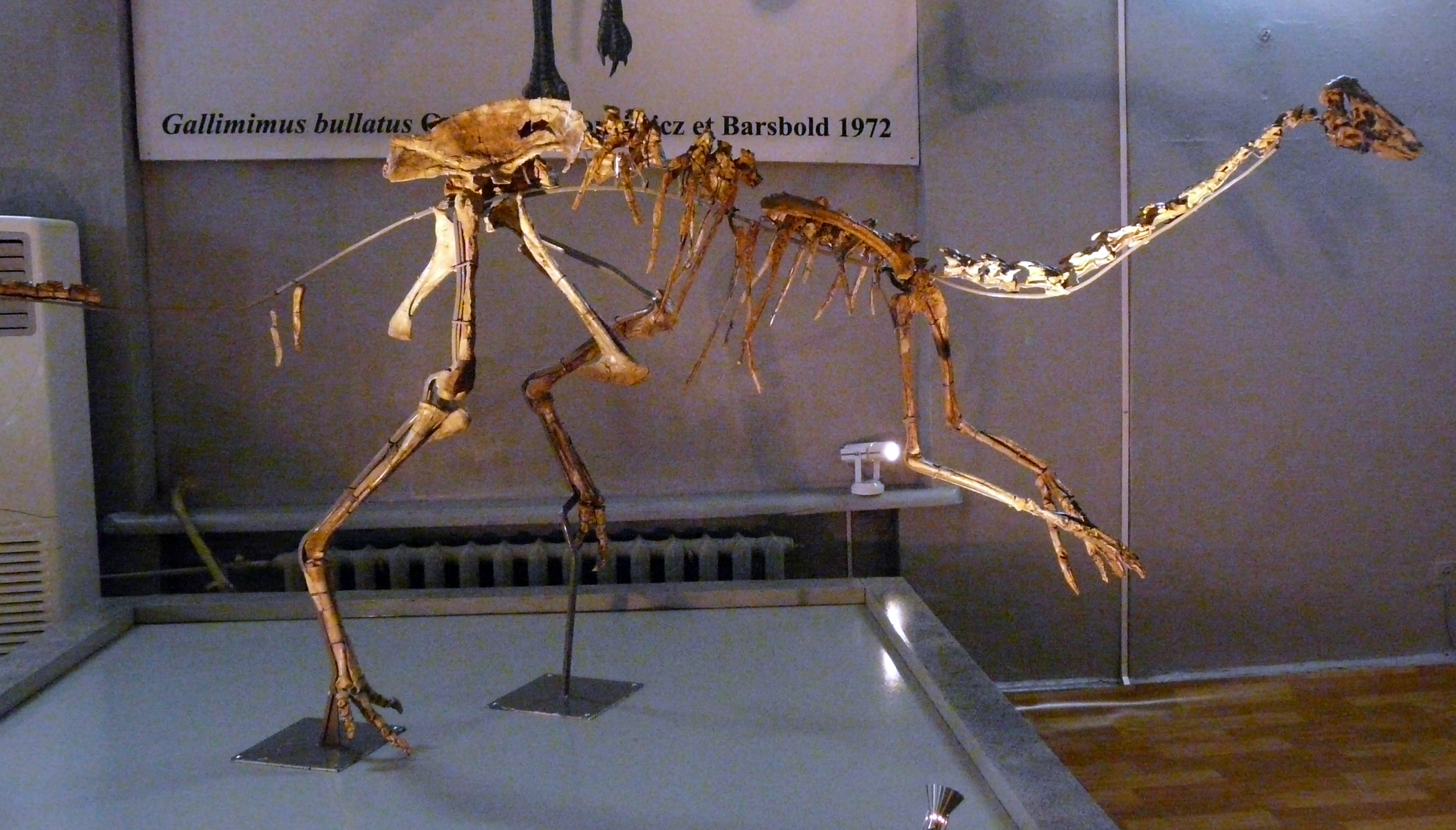
"Gallimimus mongoliensis" skeleton

"Gallimimus mongoliensis" is an informal name Rinchen Barsbold used for a nearly complete skeleton (IGM 100/14) known from the Bayan Shireh Formation of Baishan Tsav, Mongolia, but since it differs from Gallimimus in some details, Yoshitsugu Kobayashi and Barsbold proposed in 2006 that it probably belongs to a different genus. It was recently included in a phylogenetic analysis, which recovered it as closely related to Tototlmimus.

=== Gspsaurus ===
"Gspsaurus" (a nomen manuscriptum) is a titanosaurian sauropod dinosaur from the Late Cretaceous Vitakri Member of the Pab Formation of Sulaiman Basin of Pakistan. It has been suggested to be synonymous with the also invalid taxon "Maojandino", also proposed by Malkani. The intended holotype, MSM-79-19 and MSM-80-19, consisting of parts of the skull, including a rostrum, was discovered in 2001, and parts of the holotype were initially referred to "Marisaurus jeffi".

=== Grusimimus ===
"Grusimimus" (or "Tsurumimus") is an informal name for an undescribed genus of ornithomimid from the Early Cretaceous (Hauterivian–Barremian) aged Shinekhudag Formation of Mongolia. Known from a skeleton including all regions except the skull, "Grusimimus" was given an invalid name in 1997 by Rinchen Barsbold, who also suggested the species name "tsuru". The specimen (GIN 960910KD) was found in 1996 and examined by Barsbold before he suggested the informal name, a nomen nudum. An abstract and poster were presented on the taxon by Kobayashi & Barsbold in 2002, and the former published a thesis paper on the specimen (referred to as "Ornithomimosauria indet.") which found the taxon to be close to Harpymimus phylogenetically but possibly more derived. A recent phylogenetic analysis recovered "Grusimimus" closely related to Beishanlong and Garudimimus.

== H ==
=== Hanwulosaurus ===
"Hanwulosaurus" is the informal name given to an as-yet undescribed genus of dinosaur from the Late Cretaceous. It was an ankylosaur around 9 m (30 ft) long, which is long for an ankylosaur. Its fossils were found in Inner Mongolia, China. Much of a skeleton, including a complete skull, vertebrae, ribs, a scapula, an ulna, femora, bones from the shin, and armor, was discovered; this may be the most complete ankylosaurian skeleton yet found in Asia, according to early reports. Zhao Xijin, who has studied it, suggests that it may belong to its own subgroup within the Ankylosauria. The name first surfaced in news reports in 2001.

=== Haute Moulouya Sauropod ===
The "Haute Moulouya Sauropod", also known as NHMUK PV R36834, consisted originally of two complete cervical vertebrae recovered from the Lower Jurassic sediments of the Haute Moulouya Basin, likely the Aganane Formation, on central Morocco. This material was initially identified as belonging to an early member of Eusauropoda, if so, the oldest member of the group. Additional material was previously recovered: SNSB-BSPG 2014 I 106, that consists of dorsal vertebrae and a pubis fragment. A recent revision suggest both specimens belong to the same taxon, that likely comes from a higher stratigraphic level (likely Late Pliensbachian) and that represents a valid more basal taxon, related with Amygdalodon. Other analysis still recovers it alternatively as an eusauropod, in a polytomy with Barapasaurus.

=== Heilongjiangosaurus ===
"Heilongjiangosaurus" (meaning "Heilongjiang lizard") is the informal name given to an as-yet undescribed genus of duckbilled dinosaur from the Late Cretaceous. It possibly was a lambeosaurine, and may in fact be the same animal as Charonosaurus. The fossils were found in Maastrichtian-age rocks in Heilongjiang, China. As a nomen nudum, it is unclear what material it was intended to be based on, but might be connected to the nomen nudum "Mandschurosaurus" jiainensis, informally named in a 1983 publication.

The "type species" is "H. jiayinensis", and it was coined in 2001 in a faunal list by Li and Jin.

=== Hironosaurus ===
"Hironosaurus" (meaning "Hirono lizard") is the informal name given to an as-yet undescribed genus of dinosaur from the Late Cretaceous. Found in Hirono, Fukushima, Japan, it was probably a type of hadrosaur, although no subfamily identification has been made. The fossils are quite fragmentary, and consist of teeth and a vertebra, possibly from the tail. Since the fossils have never been fully described in a scientific paper, "Hironosaurus" is considered a nomen nudum. It was first mentioned by Hisa in an obscure 1988 publication and was later (1990) brought to a wider audience by David Lambert. Dong Zhiming, Y. Hasegawa, and Y. Azuma regarded the material as belonging to a hadrosaurid, but lacking any characteristics to allow more precise identification (thus indeterminate).

=== Hisanohamasaurus ===
"Hisanohamasaurus" (meaning "Hisano-hama lizard") is the informal name given to an as yet undescribed genus of dinosaur from the Late Cretaceous. It is a nomen nudum known only from teeth that first appeared in a general-audience dinosaur book by David Lambert in 1990. Although initially identified a diplodocid, it was later re-identified as a nemegtosaurid similar to Nemegtosaurus. As its name suggests, its fossils were found in Japan. The location is part of Iwaki, Fukushima.

=== Hughenden sauropod ===
The "Hughenden sauropod" is an informal name given to a titanosauriform sauropod specimen (QM F6142) discovered from the Early Cretaceous (Albian) Toolebuc Formation of Australia. It is uncertain whether the specimen can be referred to Austrosaurus from the Allaru Formation, which overlies the Toolebuc Formation.

== I ==
=== Imrankhanhero ===
"Imrankhanhero" is an informal genus of titanosaurian dinosaurs from the Late Cretaceous (Maastrichtian) Vitakri Formation of Pakistan described by Malkani (2023) in Scientific Research Publishing, a known predatory publisher. The assigned fossil material includes a humerus, a femur, fibulae, a tibia, and a metatarsal. Caudal vertebrae found nearby may also be referrable to "Imrankhanhero". The intended type species is "Imrankhanhero zilefatmi."

== J ==
=== Jeholraptor ===
"Jeholraptor" is the informal replacement genus name given to the microraptorine Sinornithosaurus haoiana—resulting in the new combination "Jeholraptor" haoiana—by Gregory S. Paul in the third edition of The Princeton Field Guide to Dinosaurs in 2024. The S. haoiana fossil is known from the Early Cretaceous (Barremian) upper Yixian Formation of China. The specimen, which is nearly complete, is about 1.2 metres (3.9 ft) long and was probably close to 3 kilograms (6.6 lb) in weight. Paul suggested that, due to similarities in the quadratojugal, "Jeholraptor" may have been a close relative of Wulong.

=== Jiangjunmiaosaurus ===
"Jiangjunmiaosaurus" (meaning "temple of the general lizard") is an informal name created by an anonymous author in 1987 for a possible chimaera of Monolophosaurus and Sinraptor. Paul (1988) tentatively placed "Jiangjunmiaosaurus" within Allosauridae and commented on the nasal ridges and orbital horn combining to form low, rugose-surfaced crests, and mentioned that "other excellent bones" may also be referable to "Jiangjunmiaosaurus".

=== Jindipelta ===
"Jindipelta" (Lei et al., 2019; in press) is the currently informal name given to an ankylosaur from the Zhumapu Formation in China. It is known from a partial skeleton collected from Cenomanian rocks in July 2011, and the intended type species is "J. zouyunensis". The name was first announced in the 2019 SVP abstract book, alongside the megalosauroid Yunyangosaurus.

=== Juliasaurus ===
"Juliasaurus" is the nickname of a theropod from the Morrison Formation similar to Allosaurus that may be a new species. The specimen is on display at the Hollytrees Museum in Colchester, UK. The specimen was obtained by a private collector, who loaned it to the museum for research.

=== Julieraptor ===
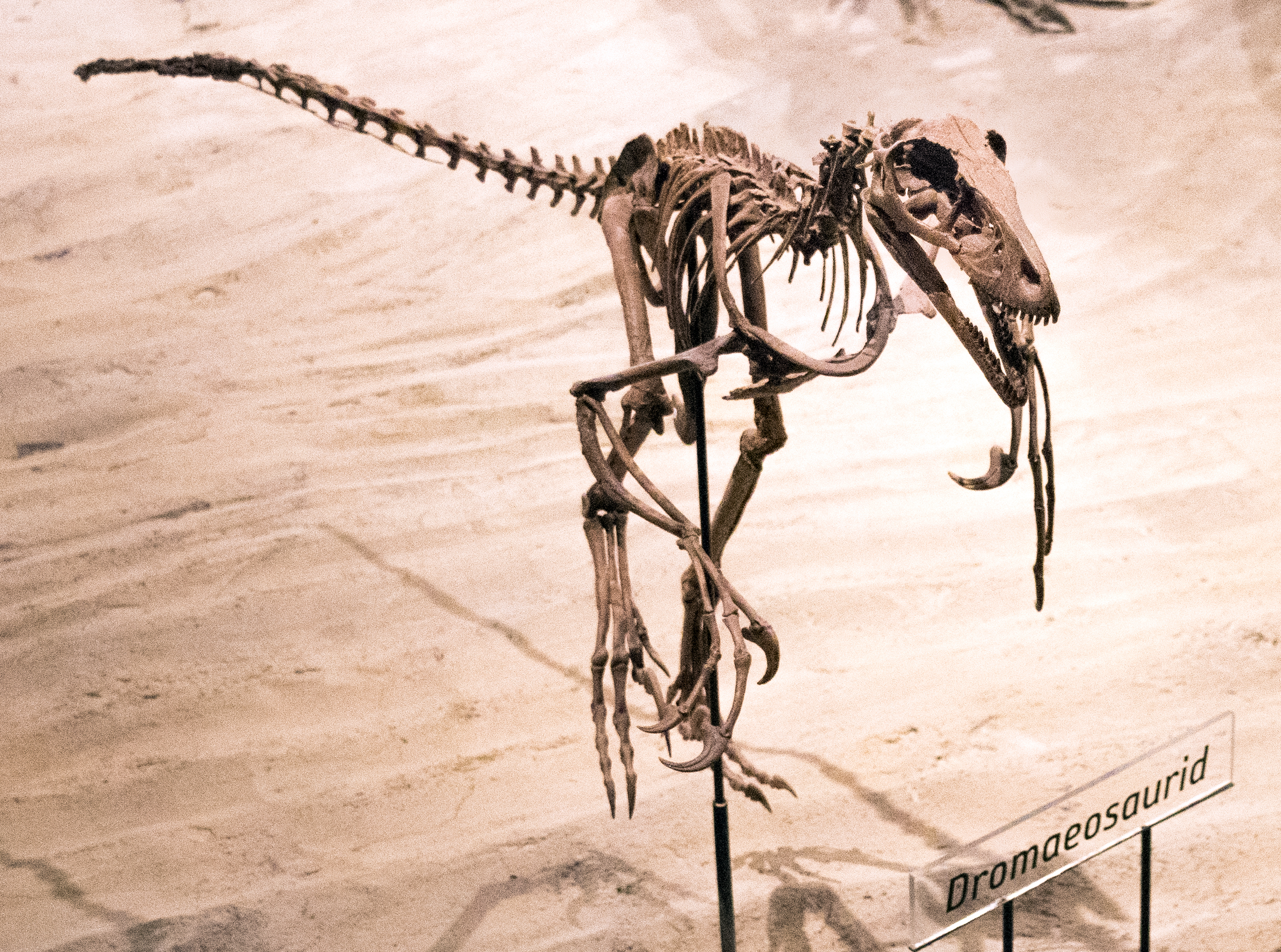
Cast of "Julieraptor"

"Julieraptor" is the nickname of a dromaeosaurid fossil found in the Judith River Formation, Montana in 2002. Parts of the same skeleton were illegally excavated and nicknamed Sid Vicious in 2006, and the poacher responsible subsequently served jail time for the theft. Bob Bakker therefore also nicknamed the specimen "Kleptoraptor". The skeleton was arranged to be sold to Royal Ontario Museum. It is known from a skeleton consisting of an almost complete skeleton missing most of its skull, most tail vertebra, part of the femur, some spinal and neck vertebra, and one claw, but it has a well preserved braincase.

== K ==
=== Kagasaurus ===
"Kagasaurus" (meaning "Kaga lizard") is the informal name given to an as yet undescribed genus of theropod dinosaur from the Early Cretaceous of what is now Japan. The type species was named by Hisa in 1988, but is known from only two teeth with no formal description, so it is considered a nomen nudum. It may belong to either a non-maniraptoriform coelurosaur or a dromaeosaurid.

=== Katsuyamasaurus ===
"Katsuyamasaurus" is an informal name for a genus of intermediate theropod known from the Early Cretaceous (Barremian) of the Kitadani Formation, Japan. Known from a single middle caudal vertebra and an ulna, the taxon was informally called "Katsuyama-ryu", until Lambert (1990) made it into an invalid genus name, "Katsuyamasaurus". The caudal vertebra was suggested to belong to an ornithopod by Chure (2000), and Olshevsky (2000) suggested the material was a synonym of Fukuiraptor. However, the ulna differs from Fukuiraptor, and the large olecranon suggests the taxon falls outside Maniraptoriformes.

=== Khetranisaurus ===
"Khetranisaurus" (meaning "Khetran lizard", for the Khetran people of Pakistan) is an informal taxon of titanosaurian sauropod from the Late Cretaceous of Balochistan, western Pakistan (also spelled "Khateranisaurus" in some early reports). The proposed species is "K. barkhani", described by M. Sadiq Malkani in 2006, and it is based on a tail vertebra, found in the Maastrichtian-age Vitakri Member of the Pab Formation. It was assigned to "Pakisauridae" (used as a synonym of Titanosauridae), along with "Pakisaurus" and "Sulaimanisaurus". It was considered invalid by Wilson, Barrett, and Carrano (2011).

=== Koreanosaurus ===
"Koreanosaurus" (meaning "Korean lizard") is the informal name given to an as-yet unnamed genus of dinosaur from the Early Cretaceous (Aptian-Albian). It was a possible dromaeosaur (or similar theropod) which was discovered in the Gugyedong Formation of South Korea, although at times it has been referred to the Tyrannosauridae, Hypsilophodontidae, and Hadrosauridae. Based solely on DGBU-78(=DGBU-1978B), a femur, the name was coined by Kim in 1979, but by 1993 Kim decided that it was a species of Deinonychus, and created the informal name "D." "koreanensis". Kim et al. (2005) referred the specimen to Eumaniraptora based on a proximolateral ridge, shelf-like posterior trochanter, and absence of an accessory trochanter and mediodistal crest. The presence of a large fourth trochanter was noted to be similar to Adasaurus and Velociraptor.

=== Kunmingosaurus ===
"Kunmingosaurus" is an informally named primitive sauropod which lived during the Early Jurassic. Its fossils were found in Yunnan, China in 1954. The type and only species is "Kunmingosaurus wudingensis", invalidly coined by Zhao in 1985. It is known from fossils found in the Fengjiahe Formation (or the Lower Lufeng Series), including pelvic, hind limb, and vertebral material.

== L ==
=== Lancanjiangosaurus ===
"Lancanjiangosaurus" (alternative spelling "Lanchanjiangosaurus"; meaning "Lancangjiang lizard", named after the Lancangjiang River of China) is the informal name given to an as yet undescribed genus of sauropod dinosaur from the Middle Jurassic. The "type species", "L. cachuensis", was coined by Zhou in 1983, but remains a nomen nudum. It is known from the Dapuka Group of Tibet.

=== Lijiagousaurus ===
"Lijiagousaurus" (meaning "Lijiagou lizard") is the informal name given to an as yet undescribed genus of herbivorous iguanodontian dinosaur from the Late Cretaceous of what is now Sichuan, China. It has not been formally described yet, but the formal publication is forthcoming, from Chinese paleontologist Ouyang Hui. "Lijiagousaurus" was only briefly mentioned in the Chongqing Natural History Museum guidebook (2001) and is thus a nomen nudum.The holotype consists of hindlimb bones, a scapula, an ischium, and other fragments.

=== Lopasaurus ===
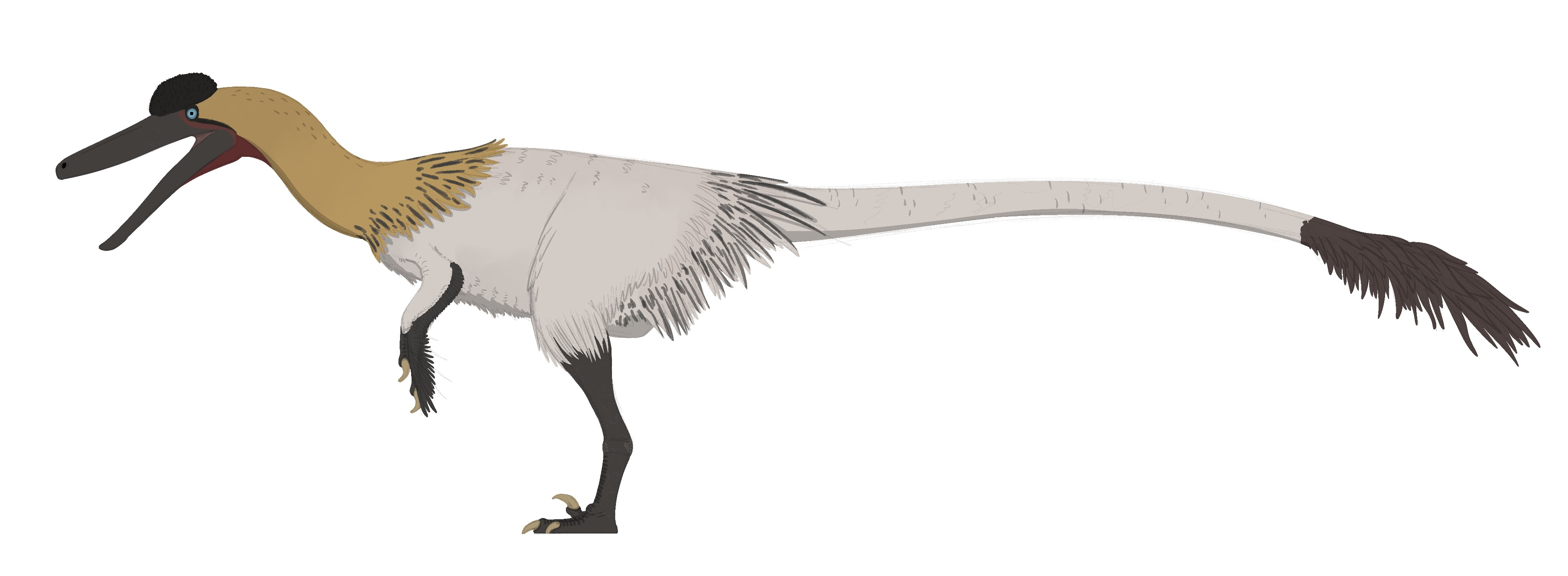
Life restoration of "Lopasaurus"

"Lopasaurus" (meaning "Lopa's lizard") is the name given to an as yet undescribed genus of dromaeosaurid theropod, possibly belonging to Unenlagiinae due to its similarity to Buitreraptor, Neuquenraptor, and Pamparaptor, from the Late Cretaceous (Maastrichtian)-aged Serra da Galga Formation in the Ponto 1 do Price site of Brazil. The intended holotype, a partial right metatarsus showing metatarsals II, III, and IV, was discovered by Alberto Lopa during the 1950s; the fossil was lost shortly after the death of Llewellyn Ivor Price in 1980 and it has not been located since. "Lopasaurus" was briefly mentioned by Brum et al. in their description of Ypupiara lopai, where it was tentatively referred to Unenlagiinae. Brum et al. (2021) also did not refer "Lopasaurus" to Ypupiara, which was found in the same formation as "Lopasaurus".

== M ==
=== Madsenius ===
"Madsenius" is a name published in 1990 by David Lambert in his Dinosaur Data Book. According to Donald F. Glut, the name refers to a new allosaurid that was to be described by Robert T. Bakker based on skull bones previously assigned to Allosaurus and Creosaurus. "Madsenius" is a nomen nudum.

=== Magulodon ===
"Magulodon" is the name given to an as yet undescribed genus of dinosaur from the Early Cretaceous (Aptian to Albian stages, approximately 112 million years ago). It was a possible ornithischian, either an ornithopod or basal ceratopsian, which was discovered in the Arundel Formation of Maryland, United States. The type species, "Magulodon muirkirkensis", was coined by Kranz in 1996. It is a tooth taxon, based solely on a single tooth discovered in April 1990. Since it has not been formally described, it is also a nomen nudum. It was considered to be an indeterminate specimen in a paper which cited the intended type specimen but avoided using the name to prevent taxonomic clutter.

=== Maltaceratops ===
"Maltaceratops" is the informal name given to an as yet undescribed genus of centrosaurine ceratopsian from the Late Cretaceous (Campanian-aged) Judith River Formation of Montana. The proposed type species is "M. hammondorum", and the proposed holotype is a possible skull. It had been previously nicknamed the "Malta new taxon".

=== Mangahouanga ===
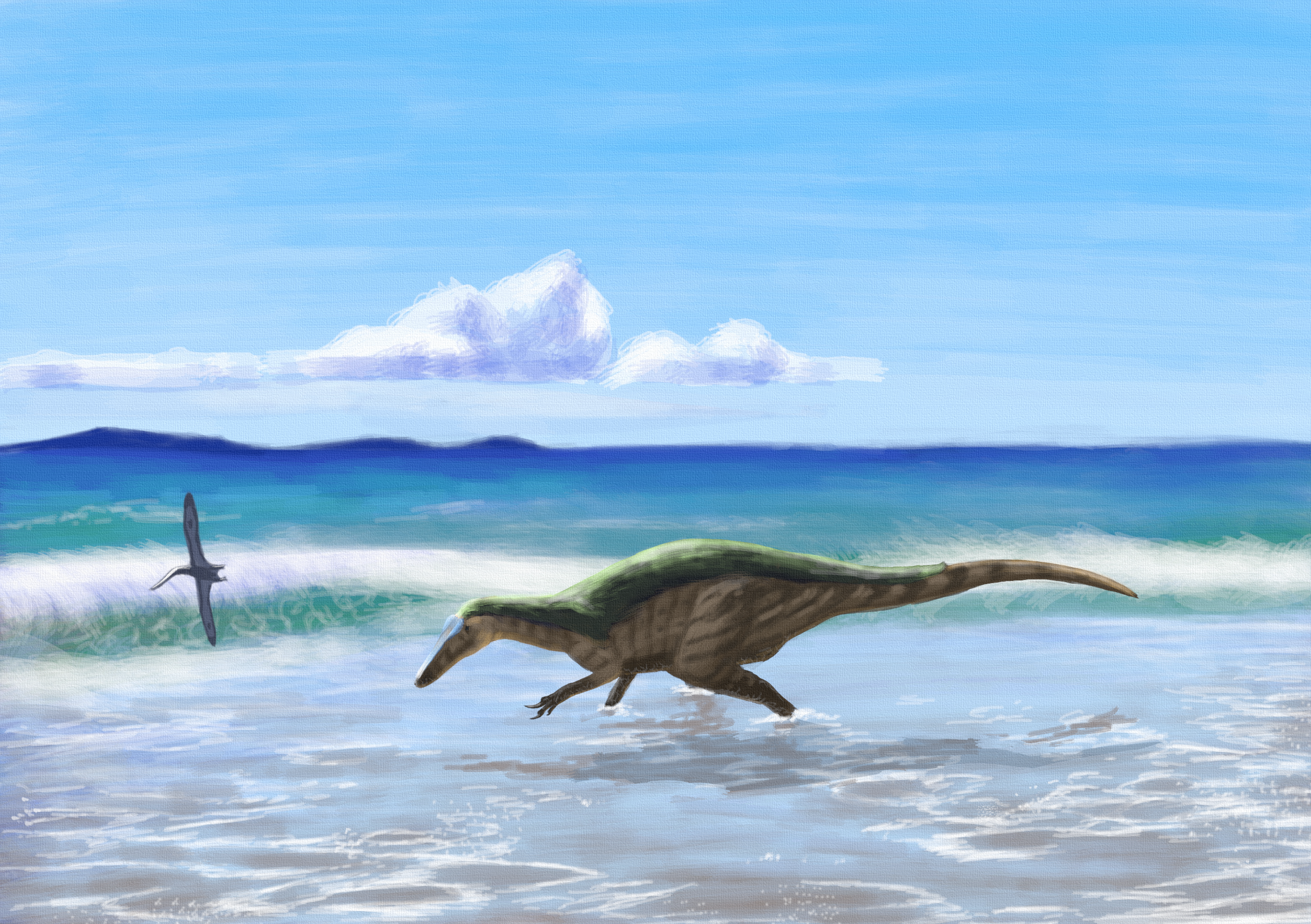
Life restoration of "Mangahouanga"

"Mangahouanga" (named after the stream of the same name), or the "Joan Wiffen's theropod" is an informal name given to the theropod discovered in the Tahora Formation, New Zealand by Joan Wiffen, who considered it to be a possible megalosaurid in 1975. The vertebra was described by Molnar 1981, and it was ruled as an indeterminate theropod in 2010 by Agnolin et al. The name "Mangahouanga" was coined by Molina-Pérez & Larramendi (2016) and no species name was given. They estimated it to reach up to 3.5 metres (11 ft) long and weigh up to 130 kilograms (290 lb) and is represented by of a single vertebra.

=== Maojandino ===
"Maojandino" is an informally named taxon of titanosaurid sauropod dinosaur from the Late Cretaceous Maastrichtian stage of Pakistan. The intended type species is "Maojandino alami."

=== Marisaurus ===
"Marisaurus" (meaning "Mari lizard", for the Mari tribe of Pakistan) is an informal taxon of titanosaurian sauropod from the Late Cretaceous of Balochistan, western Pakistan. The type species is "M. jeffi", described by Muhammad Sadiq Malkani in 2004, and it is based on tail vertebrae, found in the Maastrichtian-age Vitakri Member of the Pab Formation. Much additional material, including a partial skull, many vertebrae, and a few hindlimb bones, was referred to this genus. "Marisaurus" was assigned to "Balochisauridae" with "Sulaimanisaurus", although the family was used as a synonym of Saltasauridae. It was considered invalid by Wilson, Barrett, and Carrano (2011).

=== Maroccanoraptor ===
"Maroccanoraptor" is an informal name suggested for a supposed unenlagiine theropod from the Kem Kem Formation of Morocco, however, it lacks the requirements to become a valid taxon, thus leaving it as a naked name. The intended type species is "M. elbegiensis", first described by Singer (2015) on the basis of a single coracoid. The fossil was later suggested to belong to a non-dinosaurian crocodyliform.

=== Megacervixosaurus ===
"Megacervixosaurus" (meaning "big neck lizard") is the informal name given to an as yet undescribed genus of herbivorous dinosaur from the Late Cretaceous Zonggo Formation of Tibet. It was a titanosaur sauropod which lived in what is now China. The type species, "Megacervixosaurus tibetensis", was coined by Chinese paleontologist Zhao Xijin in 1983. "Megacervixosaurus" has never been formally described, and remains a nomen nudum.

=== Megapleurocoelus ===
"Megapleurocoelus" is an informally named sauropod belonging to Flagellicaudata, from the Kem Kem Formation of Morocco; however, it lacks the requirements to become a valid taxon, thus leaving it as a naked name. The intended type species is "M. menduckii", first described by Singer (2015) and the holotype is JP Cr376, a single centrum from a dorsal vertebra.

=== Microcephale ===
"Microcephale", also known as "Mycocephale", (meaning "tiny head") is the informal name of a genus of very small pachycephalosaurid dinosaur, otherwise known as the "North American dwarf species", which lived during the Late Cretaceous. Its fossils were found in the late Campanian-age Dinosaur Park Formation, in Alberta, Canada. Not much is known about this dinosaur, as it has not yet been fully described; it is therefore a nomen nudum. The fossils of "Microcephale", including tiny skull caps, were first mentioned by paleontologist Paul Sereno in 1997, in a list of pachycephalosaurids. These skull caps measure less than 5 cm (2 in) each. No potential species name was given.

=== Microdontosaurus ===
"Microdontosaurus" (meaning "tiny-toothed lizard") is the name given to an as yet undescribed genus of sauropod dinosaur from China. It was named from fossils from the Middle Jurassic-age Dapuka Group of Xinjiang. The intended type species is "M. dayensis." As with other informal names created by Zhao in 1983 and 1985, it has not been used since then, and may have been redescribed under another name.

=== Microvenator chagyabi ===
"Microvenator chagyabi" is the informal name given to an as yet undescribed species of theropod dinosaur, likely belonging to Coelurosauria, from the Early Cretaceous Lura Formation of Tibet, China. It was coined by Zhao (1985) and the proposed holotype consists of a specimen including teeth.

=== Mifunesaurus ===
"Mifunesaurus" (meaning 'Mifune lizard') is a nomen nudum given to an extinct non-avian non-maniraptoriform tetanuran theropod dinosaur from the Late Cretaceous (Cenomanian; ~96 Ma) Kabu Formation of Japan. The intended holotype, stored at the Mifune Dinosaur Museum, with the tooth on display, of "Mifunesaurus" consists only of a few bones, among which are a tibia, a phalanx, a metatarsus, and a single tooth (tooth catalogued as YNUGI 10003; rest of the skeleton catalogued as MDM 341), discovered by N. & K. Wasada in 1979. The genus was informally coined by Hisa in 1985 and no epithet was given. The known tooth was too thick to be the tooth of a ceratosaurid, and too tall to belong to an abelisaurid, which means that "Mifunesaurus" was probably a megalosauroid or a carnosaur based on the shape of the known tooth.

=== Mitchell ornithopod ===
The "Mitchell ornithopod" is the informal nickname of an ornithopod dinosaur discovered near Mitchell, Oregon, United States, being the first described dinosaur from Oregon but not the first discovered; a hadrosaurid sacrum was discovered in the Late Cretaceous (Campanian)-aged Cape Sebastian Sandstone near Cape Sebastian during the 1960s and excavated in 1994 by Dave Taylor, but the remains of the Cape Sebastian ornithopod were not prepared for peer review and described until 2019, merely weeks after the Mitchell ornithopod was described. The single known bone, F118B00, was a toe bone, specifically the third phalanx of the central digit of the right hindlimb foot, and was discovered by Gregory Retallack in 2015 while on an annual field trip with his students, in a layer of the Albian-aged Hudspeth Shale Formation; in 2021, Gloria Carr discovered another bone, this time a vertebra, that likely belonged to the same species of ornithopod. No excavation was required – the bone was found resting on the ground and Retallack immediately knew it was different from the various marine fossils scattered nearby. The bone was described in 2018 by Gregory Retallack, Jessica Theodor, Edward Davis, Samantha Hopkins, and Paul Barrett. It was part of a bloated carcass swept out into the ocean, likely originating from Idaho, although further discoveries, such as Strommer (2021), dispute this claim and suggest it may have been deposited by a mudflow.

The bone was later compared to more complete remains of other ornithopods and the "Mitchell ornithopod" bone most closely matched those of hadrosaurs and iguanodonts, although it was likely a basal ornithopod. Rettalack believes that the bone belonged to a new genus, although there are not enough sufficient remains to base this claim on.

=== Moshisaurus ===
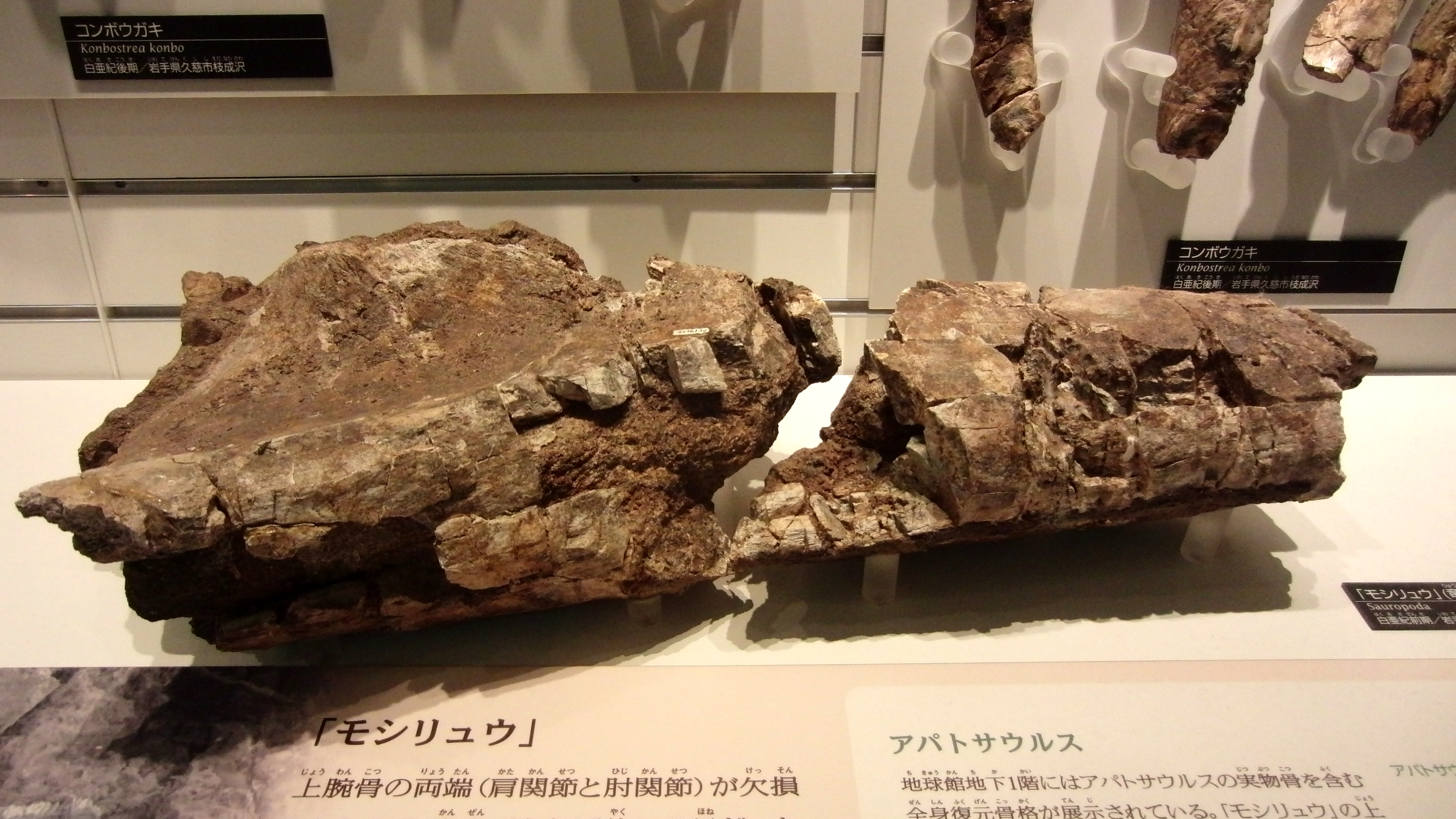
The "Moshisaurus" humerus (NSM PV17656)

Hisa (1985) used "Moshisaurus" (or "Moshi-ryu") for the incomplete sauropod humerus NSM PV17656, from the Early Cretaceous Miyako Group of Japan. Dong et al. (1990) and Hasegawa et al. (1991) referred them to Mamenchisaurus, but Azuma & Tomida (1998) and Barrett et al. (2002) assigned them to Sauropoda indet.

== N ==
=== Ngexisaurus ===
"Ngexisaurus" is the informal name given to an as yet undescribed genus of theropod dinosaur, likely belonging to Avetheropoda, from the Middle Jurassic Dapuka Group of Tibet, China. The type species, "Ngexisaurus dapukaensis", was coined by Zhao in 1983. A synonym of "Ngexisaurus" coined by Zhao (1985) is "Megalosaurus" dapukaensis and Fossilworks lists "M." dapukaensis as a megalosaurid tetanuran separate from "Ngexisaurus" proper.

=== Nicksaurus ===
"Nicksaurus" is an informally named Titanosaurian sauropod dinosaur from the Late Cretaceous red muds of the Vitakri Formation of the Sulaiman Basin, Pakistan. The dinosaur shared a habitat with other sauropod dinosaurs including Khetranisaurus, Sulaimanisaurus, Pakisaurus, Gspsaurus, Saraikimasoom, and Maojandino.

The intended type species is "Nicksaurus razashahi" and was first used by Malkani (2019).

=== Nurosaurus ===
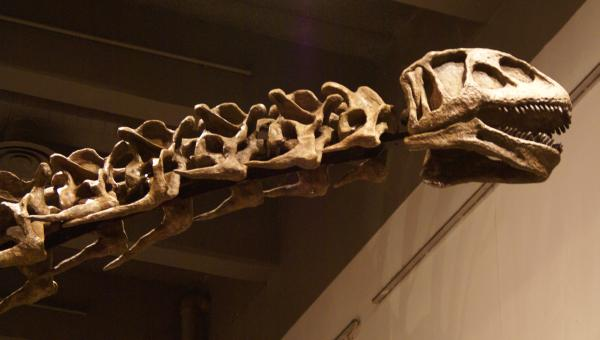
A close-up of the head of "Nurosaurus qaganensis".

"Nurosaurus" (Nur-o-saw-rus, meaning "Nur lizard") is the informal name for a genus of sauropod dinosaur. It is known from a partial, large skeleton, that was presented as soon-to-be-described by Zhiming Dong in 1992, where he gave the proposed binomial "Nurosaurus qaganensis". It was discovered in the Qagannur Formation of Inner Mongolia, China, 65 km (40 mi) southeast of Erenhot. The deposit is younger than the Psittacosaurus-bearing Guyang Group, but is still Early Cretaceous. It was found alongside the plates and scapula of a stegosaur.

The foot of "Nurosaurus" is notable for a stress fracture present on the first phalanx of the fourth digit of the left foot, which was the first identified fracture of its kind, and have since been identified on the phalanges and metatarsals of Apatosaurus, Barosaurus, Brachiosaurus, Camarasaurus, and Diplodocus.

== O ==
=== Oharasisaurus ===
"Oharasisaurus" is the name given to an as yet undescribed genus of somphospondylian sauropod, possibly belonging to the Euhelopodidae, from the Early Cretaceous Kuwajima Formation (Facies III layer) of Japan. The name "Oharasisaurus" was coined by Larramendi & Molina Pérez (2020) and the holotype, a tooth, was first mentioned by Matsuoka (2000).

=== Orcomimus ===
"Orcomimus" (pronounced or-coh-mEYEm-us) is the name given to an as yet undescribed genus of dinosaur from the Late Cretaceous period 66 million years ago. The dinosaur was an ornithomimid which lived in what is now South Dakota, in the United States. The type was coined by Michael Triebold in 1997, but has never been formally described and is currently a nomen nudum. "Orcomimus" was a bipedal theropod, but the dinosaur is known from only a pelvis and a hindlimb. "Orcomimus" is thought to be relatively advanced for other ornithomimids at the time, although this is hard to tell from the limited amount of specimens found of the dinosaur. It may be referable to one of the ornithomimosaur species currently known from the Hell Creek Formation, where the holotype of "Orcomimus" was found.

=== Oshanosaurus ===
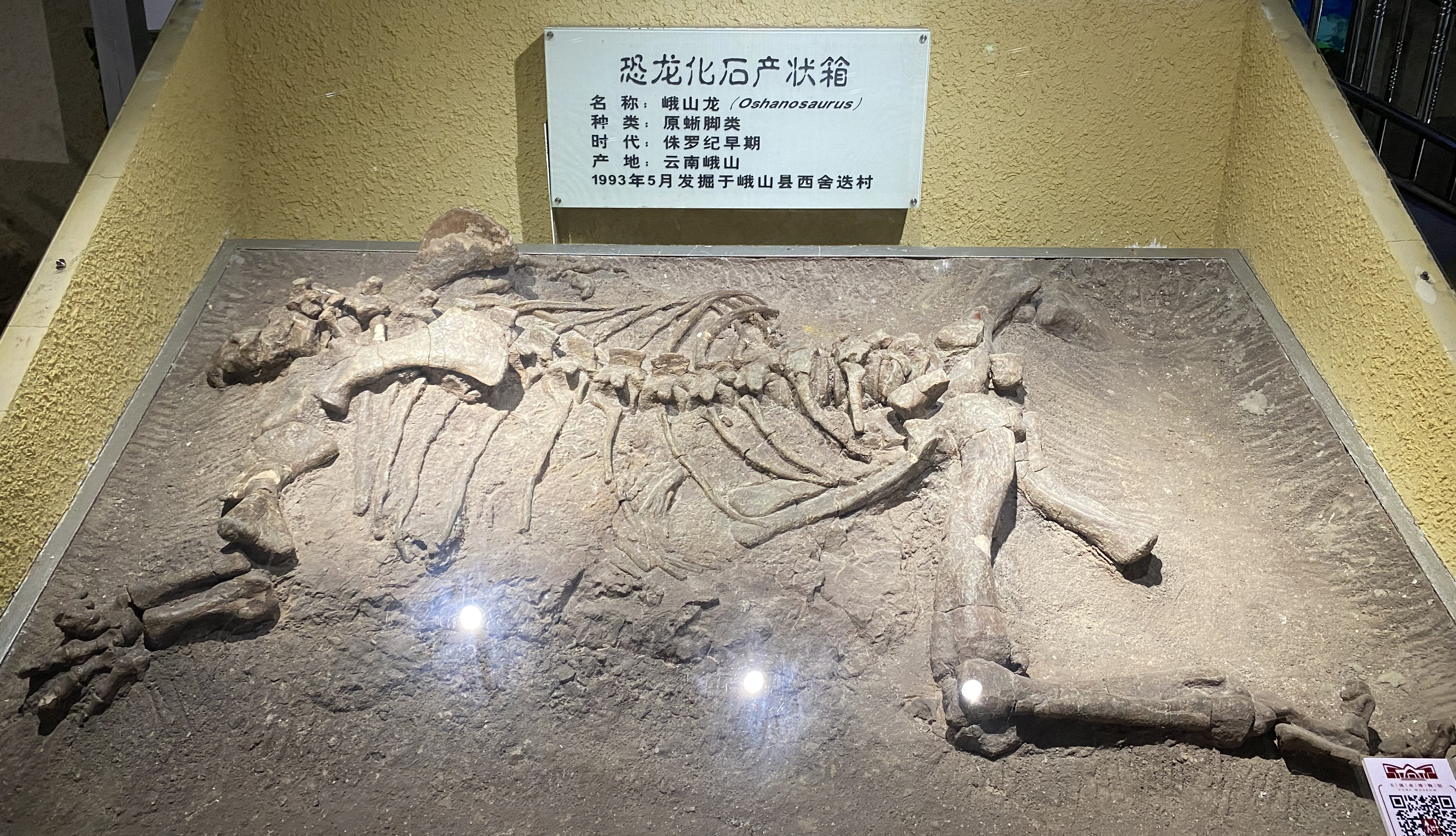
Oshanosaurus fossil collected in Yuxi Museum, China

"Oshanosaurus" (meaning "Oshan lizard") is the informal name given to an as yet undescribed genus of sauropod dinosaur from the Early Jurassic period of Yunnan, China. Its fossils were found in the Lower Lufeng Series. The intended "type species", "Oshanosaurus youngi", was coined by Zhao in 1985. It has sometimes been associated with heterodontosaurids, which appears to be due to the juxtaposition of a species of Dianchungosaurus (formerly thought to be a heterodontosaurid) in the text of Zhao (1985).

In 1971 Zhao Xijin discovered a dinosaur fossil at Dianchung in Eshan county, giving it the informal name "Oshanosaurus youngi". In their 2019 popular book Dinosaur Facts and Figures: The Theropods, Molina-Perez and Larramendi suggested that it belonged to the theropod Eshanosaurus, but without elaboration.

=== Osteoporosia ===
"Osteoporosia gigantea" is an informally named theropod, either belonging to Carcharodontosauridae or Megaraptora, from the Kem Kem Group of Morocco. It lacks the requirements to become a valid taxon, thus leaving it as a naked name. It was informally described by Singer (2015) based on a tooth and a fragment of neural arch probably belonging to a posterior dorsal vertebra (JP Cr340). The material is from a private collection.

In 2019 Molina-Pérez & Larramendi suggested that "Osteoporosia" could be a possible synonym of Sauroniops pachytholus. They also estimated it in 7.9 m long and 1.55 tons, with a hip height of 2.25 m.

=== Otogosaurus ===
"Otogosaurus" is an informally named sauropod from Inner Mongolia, China. The supposed type species is "Otogosaurus sarulai". It is known from partial postcranial remains, including a tibia 2.2 meters (7.2 ft) long and several footprints. It is named after Otog Banner in Inner Mongolia where it was discovered, and Sarula, the girl who discovered the fossils. Despite sometimes being presented as a valid taxon, sometimes accompanied by citations to Zhao (2004) or Zhao & Tan (2004), scholars have not been able to locate such a source, so it remains informal until a paper is discovered.

== P ==
=== Pakisaurus ===
"Pakisaurus" (meaning "Pakistan lizard") is an informal taxon of titanosaurian sauropod from the Late Cretaceous of Balochistan, western Pakistan, and also Gujarat, India. The proposed species is "P. balochistani", and it was named by M. Sadiq Malkani in 2006, based on isolated tail vertebrae found in the Maastrichtian-age Vitakri Member of the Pab Formation. In 2023, a femur discovered in the Lameta Formation of India was assigned to "Pakisaurus".

It was considered invalid by Wilson, Barrett, and Carrano (2011) during their description of a Jainosaurus cf. septentrionalis skeleton.

"Anokhadino mirliaquati" was synonymised with "Pakisaurus balochistani" by Malkani (2019).

=== Paw Paw scuteling ===
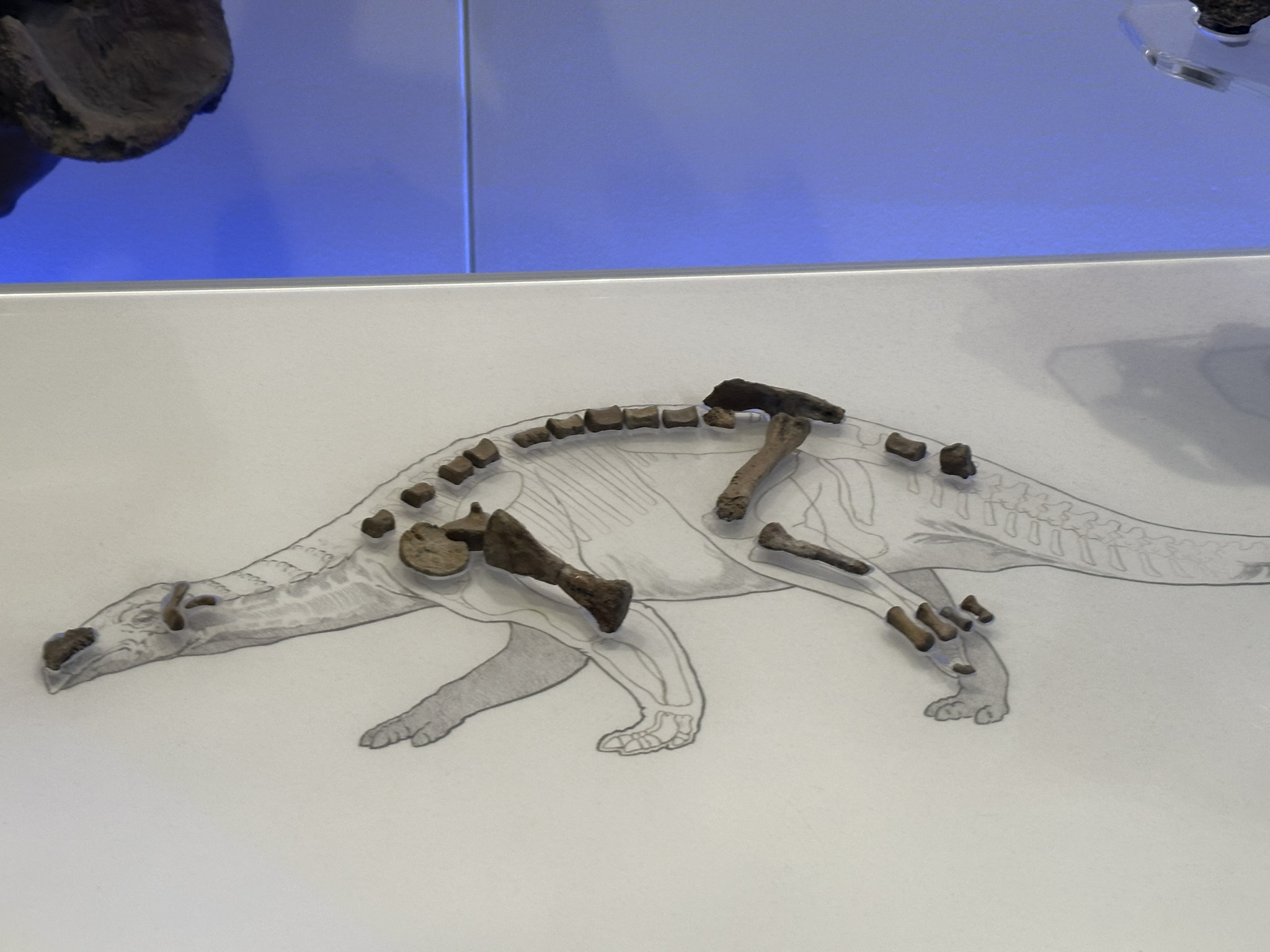
The "Paw Paw scuteling" at the Fort Worth Museum of Science and History

The "Paw Paw scuteling" is the name used for a juvenile nodosaurid discovered in 1990 from the Paw Paw Formation of northern Fort Worth, Texas. It was discovered by John C. Maurice, the 12-year-old son of fossil collector John M. Maurice. The specimen consists of a partial skeleton including a third of the backbone, part of the skull, and both leg and arm elements. It is one of two or three nodosaurs known from the formation alongside Pawpawsaurus and Texasetes, and one of the very few known specimens of a baby nodosaur. Some phylogenetic analyses have recovered it as sister to Niobrarasaurus. Although taxonomically indeterminate due to its life stage and fragmentary nature, it is often used in phylogenetic analyses for determining the taxonomic affinity of other nodosaur genera.

=== Podischion ===
"Podischion" is an informal genus of hadrosaurid dinosaur known from a skeleton discovered in 1911 on the Red Deer River in Alberta by a crew led by Barnum Brown. The remains were tentatively named "Podischion", which was not mentioned in published literature until Dingus & Norell (2010). It is possible that the skeleton represents an individual of Hypacrosaurus.

== Q ==
=== Qaikshaheen ===
"Qaikshaheen" is an informal genus of titanosaurian dinosaurs from the Late Cretaceous (Maastrichtian) Vitakri Formation of Pakistan described by Malkani (2023) in Scientific Research Publishing, a known predatory publisher. The proposed holotype specimen includes fragmentary cervical and dorsal vertebrae, partial pectoral and pelvic girdles, humeri, femora, a tibia, and fibulae. Other bones, including several vertebrae, ribs, a humerus, ulnae, metacarpals, metatarsals, a femur, and a partial pelvic girdle, were also referred. The intended type species is "Qaikshaheen masoomniazi."

== R ==
=== Ronaldoraptor ===
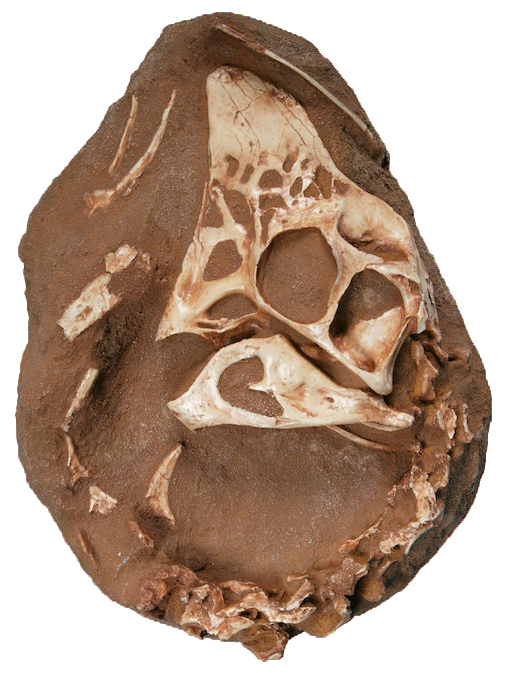
Cast of "Ronaldoraptor"

"Ronaldoraptor", also known as the "Mitrata" Oviraptorid, is an undescribed oviraptorid from Mongolia and has been listed as "Oviraptor sp." The name was first used by Luis Rey in 2003, in his book A Field Guide to Dinosaurs: The Essential Handbook for Travelers in the Mesozoic, where he drew an illustration, captioning it "Ronaldoraptor". "Ronaldoraptor" may have been closely related to Citipati osmolskae.

=== Rutellum ===
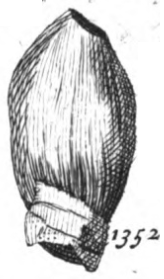
Only known illustration of the "Rutellum" holotype, from Lhuyd (1699)

"Rutellum" is the pre-Linnaean name given to a dinosaur specimen from the Late Jurassic (Oxfordian)-aged Coralline Oolite Formation. It was a sauropod, possibly a cetiosaurid, which lived in what is now England. The specimen (OU 1352), called "Rutellum impicatum", was described in 1699 by Edward Lhuyd alongside specimen OU 1358, what is now believed to be a Megalosaurus tooth crown, and is notable as the earliest named entity that is recognizable as a dinosaur. It was based on a tooth collected from Caswell, near Witney, Oxfordshire.

Because "Rutellum impicatum" was named before 1758 (the official starting date for zoological nomenclature according to the ICZN), it is not considered a part of modern biological nomenclature.

== S ==
=== Sabinosaurus ===
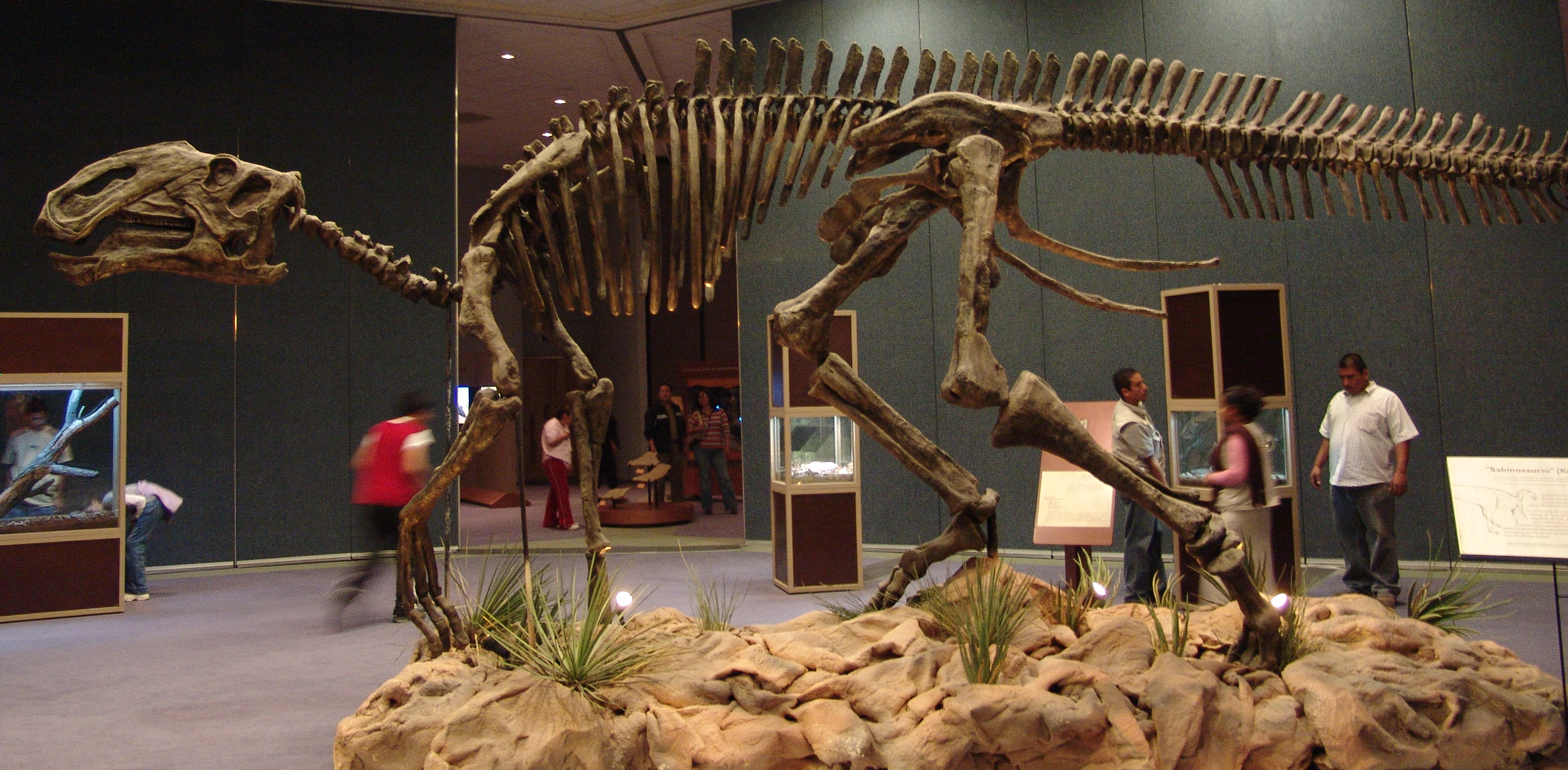
"Sabinosaurus" mount

"Sabinosaurus" or "Sabinosaurio" is a name used for PASAC-1, a partial skeleton of a hadrosaur that was discovered in the Sabinas Basin in Mexico in 2001. It was initially described as Kritosaurus sp. by Jim Kirkland and colleagues (2006), but considered an indeterminate saurolophine by Prieto-Márquez (2014). This skeleton is about 20% larger than other known specimens, around 11 m (36 ft) long, and with a distinctively curved ischium, and represents the largest known well-documented North American saurolophine. Unfortunately, the nasal bones are also incomplete in the skull remains from this material.

=== Safisaur ===
"Safisaur" (honoring Dr. Amtyaz Safi) is an invalid genus name proposed by M. Sadiq Malkani for an alleged dicraeosaurid sauropod from Pakistan. The name first appeared in September 2025 in an unreviewed manuscript hosted on ResearchGate. The material was previously mentioned in another unreviewed manuscript posted a month prior by Malkani, Muhammad, and Safi, who identified it simply as belonging to a probable large dinosaur that may have originated from either Jurassic or Cretaceous strata. Malkani's 2025 paper preferred the possibly Middle Jurassic rocks of what may be the Shinawari Formation. The intended type species is "Safisaur niazensis". While no holotype specimen was proposed, he associated the name with a putative isolated neural arch of a possible dorsal vertebra discovered in August 2025, apparently demonstrating the bifurcated neural spine characteristic of dicraeosaurids. A possible proximal femur was also found in the locality.

=== Saldamosaurus ===
"Saldamosaurus" is an informal genus of stegosaurid dinosaur known from a complete braincase discovered in the Early Cretaceous Saldam Formation of Siberia, Russia. The type species, "Saldamosaurus tuvensis", was named in 2014, but according to Galton and Carpenter (2016) it did not meet the requirements of the International Code of Zoological Nomenclature and is hence a nomen nudum.

=== Saltillomimus ===
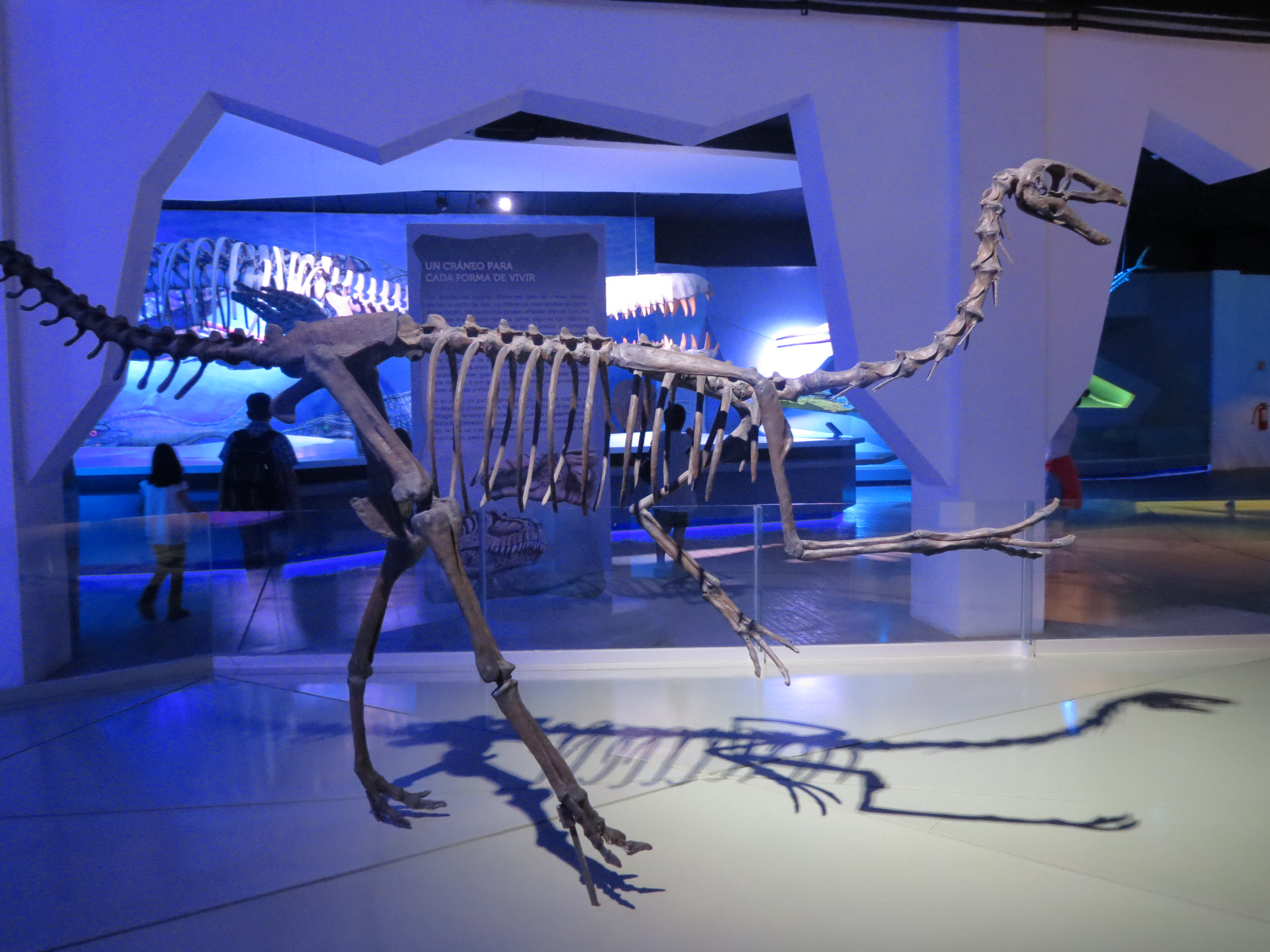
Reconstructed skeleton of "Saltillomimus"

"Saltillomimus" (meaning "Saltillo mimic") is an informal name for an ornithomimid theropod from the Late Cretaceous (late Campanian) of the Cerro del Pueblo Formation in Mexico. It is known from SEPCP 16/237, a partial tail, most of a hindlimb, and forelimb bones, discovered in 1998, and the possible juvenile specimen SEPCP 16/221, a partial leg and hip bone, that was given the name "Saltillomimus rapidus" by Martha Carolina Aguillón Martinez in 2010. A skeletal reconstruction was put on display in 2014 at the Museo del Desierto, which served to highlight its robust thighs and unusual hips that combine primitive and advanced features seen in ornithomimosaurs from both Asia and North America. Named in Martinez's 2010 thesis, the taxon name is an invalid nomen ex dissertatione.

=== Sanchusaurus ===
"Sanchusaurus" (meaning "Lizard from Sanchu") or "Sanchu-ryu" is an informal name for a possible ornithomimosaur dinosaur from the Early Cretaceous period of Asia. It is only known by a partial tail vertebra, found in Nakasato, Japan. Dong (1990) considered it synonymous with Gallimimus but the large discrepancy in both age and location between the two species renders this opinion untenable. The genus has not been formally described and is considered a nomen nudum. It was first mentioned by Hisa in 1985. In 2006, it was proposed that this individual was not fully grown at the time of its death, and that characteristics of the vertebra are not unique to that of ornithomimosaurs.

=== Saraikimasoom ===
"Saraikimasoom" (meaning 'Innocent one') is an invalid species of titanosaur dinosaur from the Vitakri Formation in Pakistan. The type species, Saraikimasoom vitakri, was described by Sadiq Malkhani in 2015, in a paper describing multiple Pakistani dinosaurs, such as Gspsaurus, "Nicksaurus", and "Maojandino". Saraikimasoom is currently recognised as a nomen manuscriptum.

=== Shake-N-Bake theropod ===
The "Shake-N-Bake theropod" is an undescribed species of coelophysoid from the Kayenta Formation, known from partial skeleton MCZ 8817 within the collection of Harvard Museum of Natural History.

=== Shansaraiki ===
"Shansaraiki" (meaning "respected Saraiki peoples") is an informal genus of theropod that was probably an abelisaur. The holotype was found in the Shalghara locality of the Late Cretaceous Vitakri Formation of Pakistan and consists of GSP/ MSM-140-3 (symphysis), GSP/MSM-5-3 (mid-ramus with partial teeth bases), and GSP/MSM-57-3 (dorsal vertebrae), although they may belong to separate specimens as they were found apart from each other. The intended type species is "Shansaraiki insafi" and was first mentioned by Malkani (2022) in Scientific Research Publishing, a known predatory publisher.

=== Siamodracon ===
"Siamodracon" is an extinct genus of invalid stegosaurid dinosaur known from a single dorsal vertebra found in Thailand's Phu Kradung Formation. The type species, "Siamodracon altispinax", was named by Ulansky in 2014. According to Galton and Carpenter (2016), it did not meet the requirements of the International Code of Zoological Nomenclature. "Siamodracon" was the first thyreophoran dinosaur discovered in South East Asia.

=== Sidormimus ===
"Sidormimus" is an informal genus of noasaurid discovered in the Elrhaz Formation in Niger. It was discovered in 2000 by Chris Sidor and it was immediately named as "Sidormimus" by Lyon on the Project Exploration website, with a photograph of the intended holotype. During the same year, on the National Geographic website, the same photograph of the specimen was labelled "Dogosaurus", and it was noted that the neck and ribs were exposed when the specimen was discovered. It has also been referred to as the "Gadoufaoua noasaurid" or the "unnamed Niger noasaurid", and Sidor himself confirmed via personal communication in 2005 that "Sidormimus" was the Elrhaz noasaurid. In a 2010 conference abstract, this articulated specimen was suggested to have possible fossorial (digging) adaptations, which led paleontologists including Paul Sereno to refer the specimen to as the "digging raptor".

=== Sinopeltosaurus ===
"Sinopeltosaurus" is a dubious genus of extinct thyreophoran ornithischian dinosaur described by Roman Ulansky. The type and only species is "S. minimus" of the lower Jurassic Lufeng Formation of Yunnan, China, based on an articulated set of ankle bones. The specimen is FMNH CUP 2338, and includes the distal tibia and fibula, distal tarsals, most metatarsals, and some phalanges. FMNH CUP 2338 was described in 2008 by Randall Irmis and Fabian Knoll, as one of the few definitive specimens of Ornithischia from the Early Jurassic based on features of the ankle and pes. In 2016, Peter Malcolm Galton and Kenneth Carpenter identified it as a nomen dubium, and listed it as Ornithischia indet., possible Thyreophora indet. Ulansky variously referred to it as "Sinopeltosaurus minimus" or "Sinopelta minima"; Galton and Carpenter, as the first revisers under ICZN, made the former official.

=== Skaladromeus ===
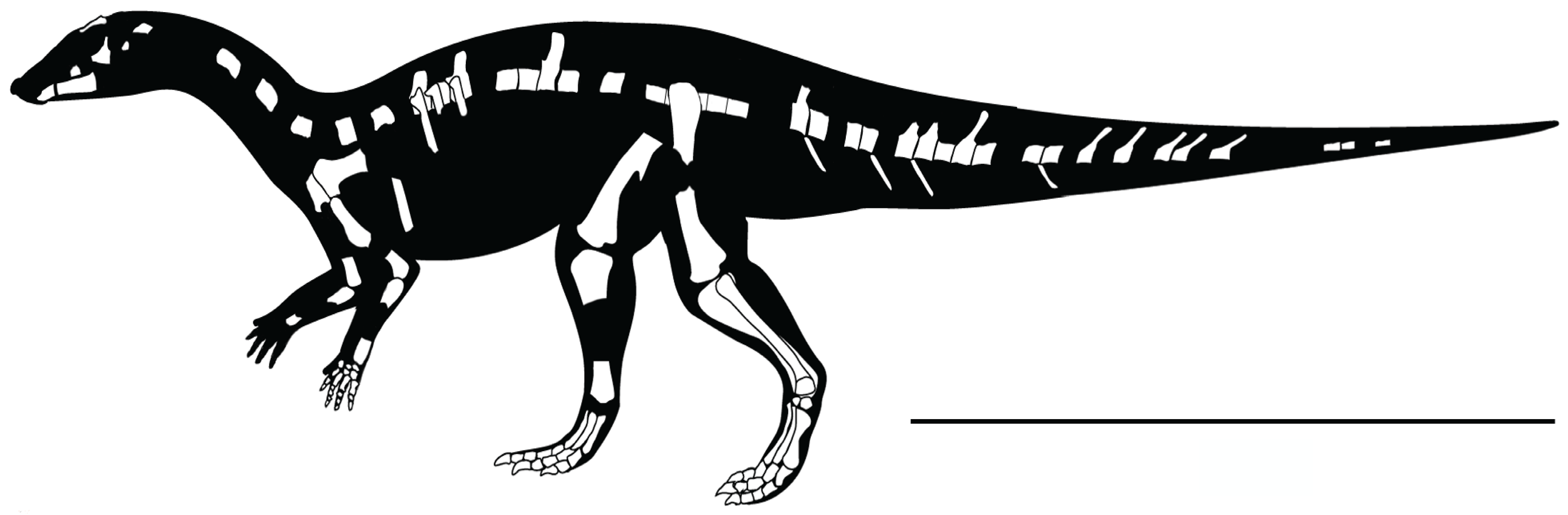
Skeletal diagram of "Skaladromeus"

"Skaladromeus" or the "Kaiparowits ornithopod" is an ornithopod from the Kaiparowits Formation named in a 2012 thesis by Clint Boyd. The intended type species is "Skaladromeus goldenii".

=== Sousatitan ===
"Sousatitan" is the name given to an as yet undescribed genus of titanosaurian sauropod dinosaur from the Early Cretaceous-aged Rio Piranhas Formation of Brazil. The intended holotype consists of a left fibula, and "Sousatitan" was coined by Ghilardi et al. (2016).

=== Stegotitanus ===
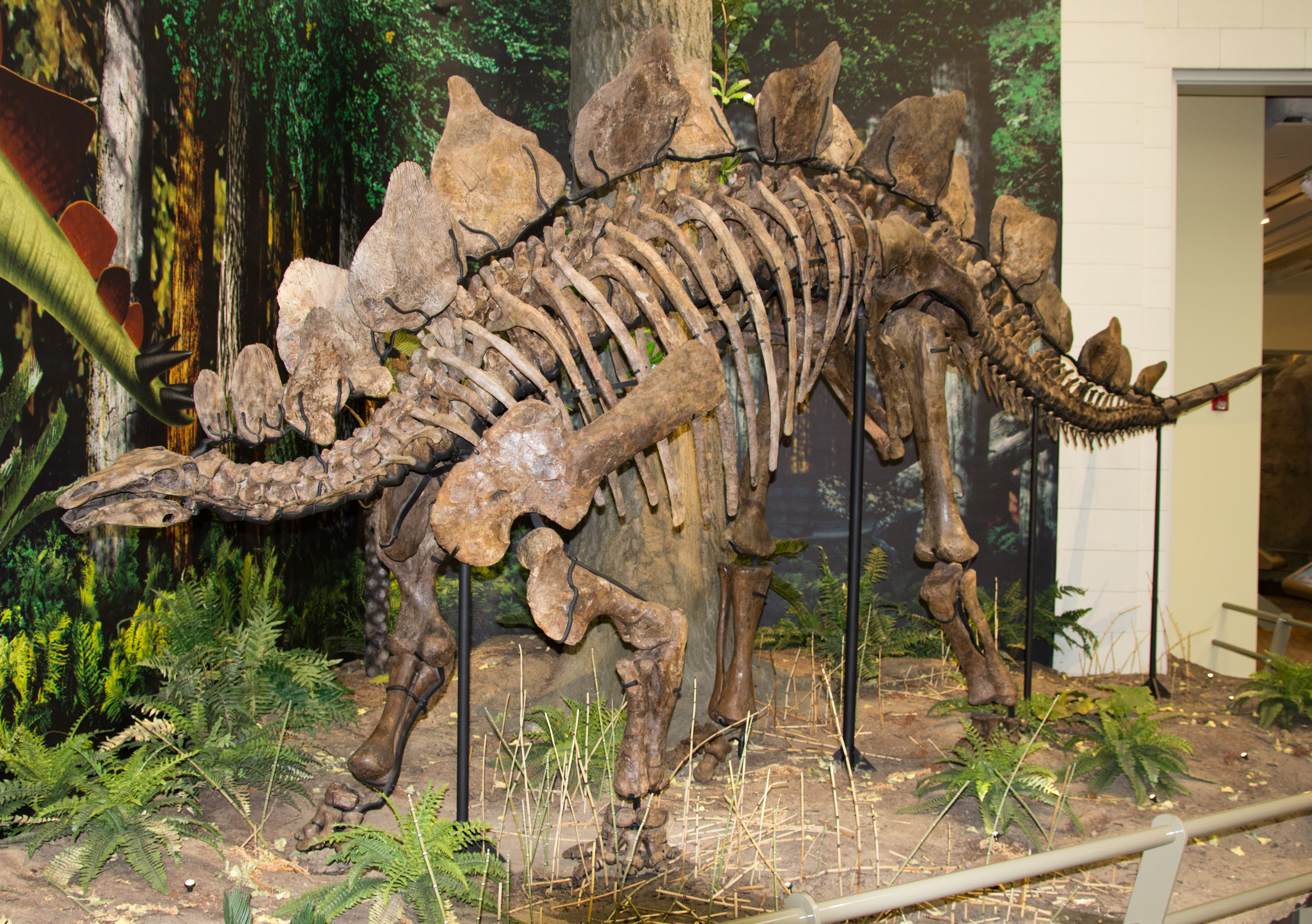
Mounted skeleton of Stegosaurus ("Stegotitanus") ungulatus

"Stegotitanus" is the informal replacement genus name given to the stegosaur Stegosaurus ungulatus—resulting in the new combination "Stegotitanus" ungulatus—by Gregory S. Paul in the third edition of The Princeton Field Guide to Dinosaurs in 2024. Stegosaurus ungulatus fossils are known from the Late Jurassic (Kimmeridgian) upper Morrison Formation of Wyoming, US. "Stegotitanus" was one of the largest stegosaurs, at about 7 metres (23 ft) long and 4.2 metric tons (4.1 long tons; 4.6 short tons) in weight.

=== Suciasaurus ===
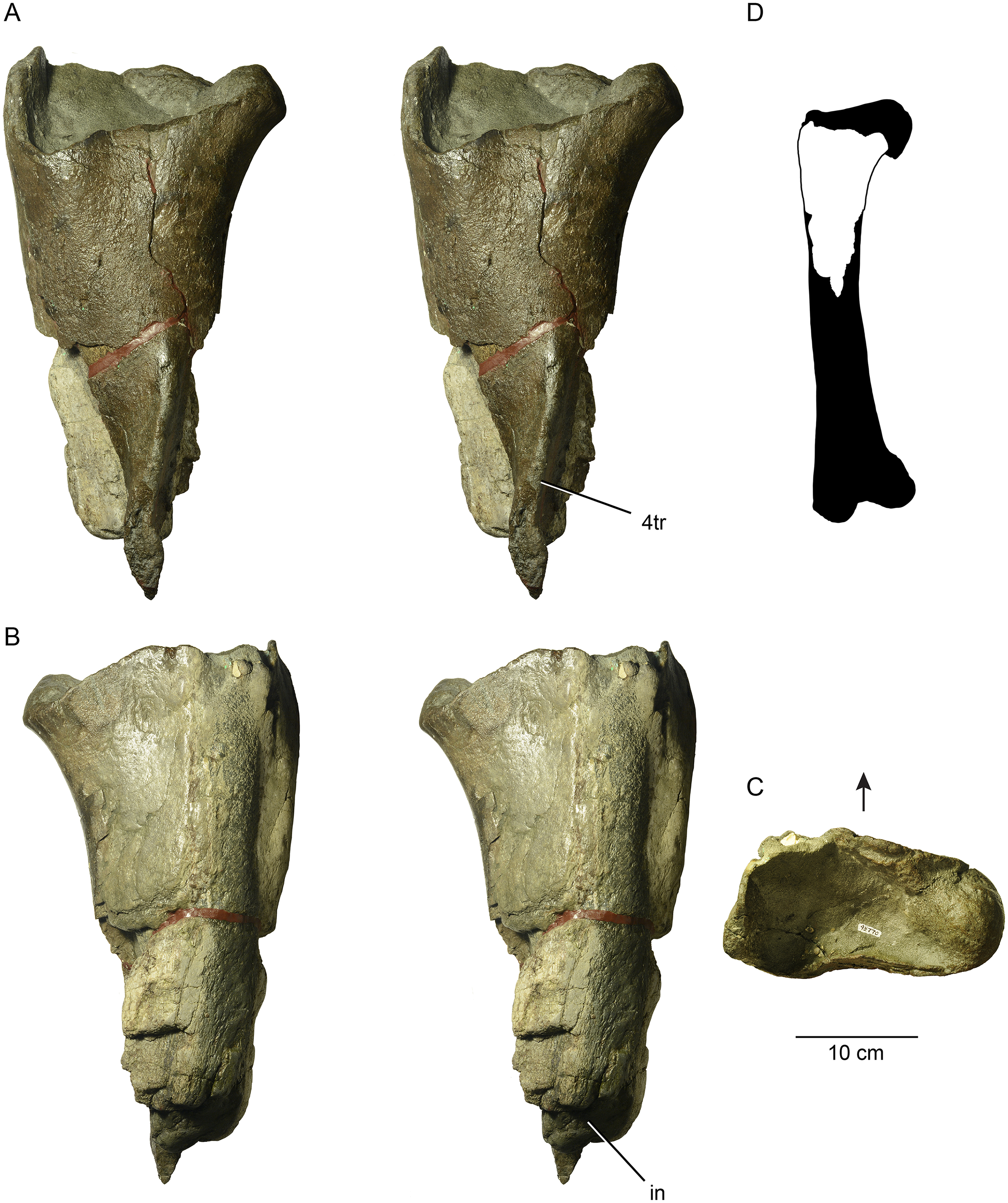
The upper femur of "Suciasaurus"

A fossil theropod (possibly a tyrannosaur) nicknamed "Suciasaurus rex" was discovered in 2012 at Upper Cretaceous Cedar District Formation, placed in Sucia Island State Park, San Juan County of the U.S. State of Washington. It was the first dinosaur discovered in Washington state. The finding was announced when Burke Museum paleontologists published a discovery paper in PLoS ONE. Prompted by a petition from students at an elementary school at Parkland, near Tacoma, the Washington State Legislature introduced a bill in 2019 to make it the official state dinosaur. A renewed push came in 2021, though House Republicans, like Minority leader J. T. Wilcox, called it low priority versus the ongoing COVID-19 pandemic, and eventually the bill failed to pass, though in 2023 it passed.

=== Sugiyamasaurus ===
"Sugiyamasaurus" (meaning "Sugiyama lizard") is the informal name given to a few spatulate teeth belonging to a titanosauriform, possibly Fukuititan, which lived in Japan during the Early Cretaceous. The name was first printed by David Lambert in 1990 in the Dinosaur Data Book, and also appears in Lambert's Ultimate Dinosaur Book and in many on-line lists of dinosaurs. Since it has not been formally described, "Sugiyamasaurus" is a nomen nudum. Remains were found near Katsuyama City and were initially referred to Camarasauridae, but might belong to Fukutitan because they were unearthed in the same quarry as the Fukuititan material.

=== Sulaimanisaurus ===
"Sulaimanisaurus" (meaning "Sulaiman lizard", for the Sulaiman foldbelt) is an informal taxon of titanosaurian sauropod from the Late Cretaceous of Balochistan, western Pakistan (also spelled "Sulaimansaurus" in some early reports). The proposed species is "S. gingerichi", described by M. Sadiq Malkani in 2006, and it is based on seven tail vertebra, found in the Maastrichtian-age Vitakri Member of the Pab Formation. Four additional tail vertebrae have been assigned to it. It was considered to be related to "Pakisaurus" and "Khetranisaurus" in the family "Pakisauridae" (used as a synonym of Titanosauridae). It was considered invalid by Wilson, Barrett, and Carrano (2011).

== T ==
=== Teihivenator ===
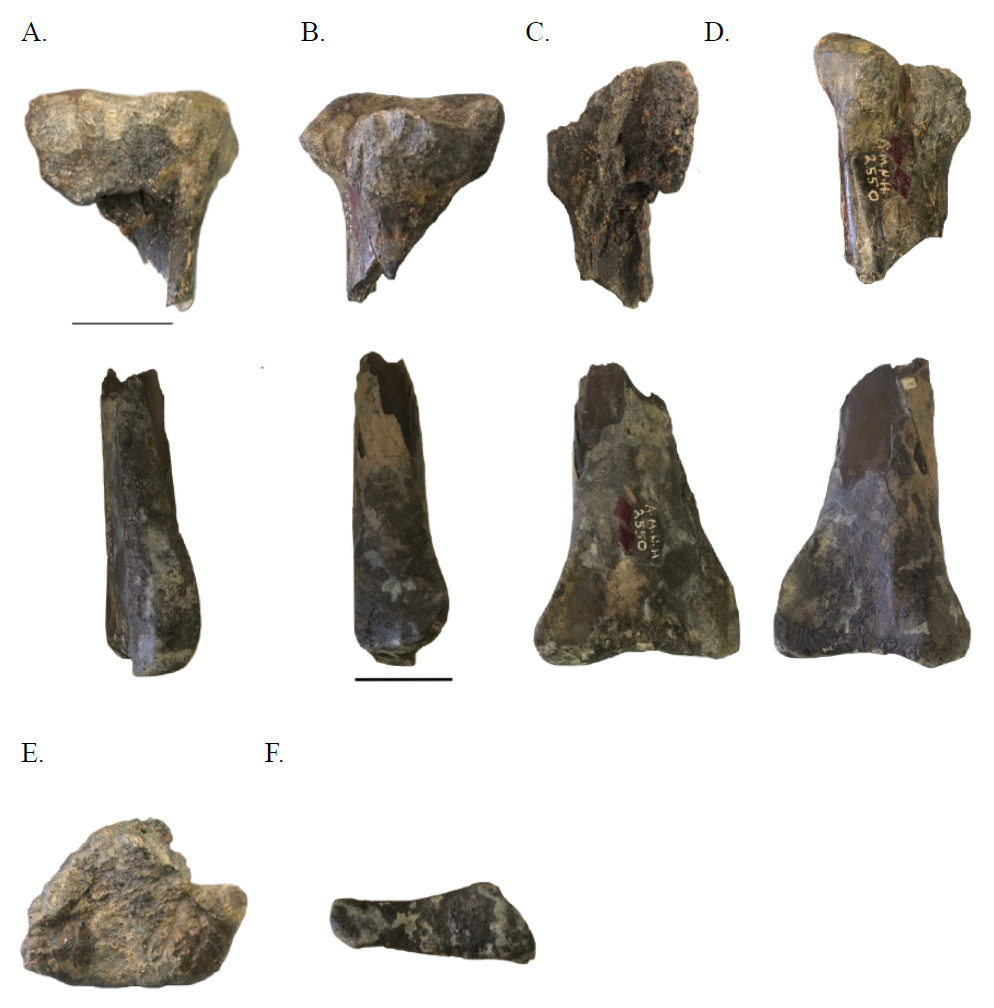
Syntype tyrannosauroid tibia AMNH 2550 given the name "Teihivenator"

"Teihivenator" ("strong hunter") is an improperly named taxon of tyrannosauroid coelurosaur from the Navesink Formation of New Jersey. It was suggested to contain the species, "T." macropus, originally classified as a species of Dryptosaurus (= "Laelaps", a name preoccupied by a mite). It was suggested as a separate genus in 2017 by Chan-gyu Yun. The name "Teihivenator" is invalid because the publication naming it is online-only, which means that a registration with ZooBank is required to be present in the article when published. However, the ZooBank registry was only added in after initial publication, meaning that it fails the requirement to be a validly published taxon.

In 2017, a preprint paper by Chase Brownstein concluded that the remains of L. macropus are a mixture of tyrannosauroid and ornithomimid elements with no distinguishing characteristics, rendering the species a chimera and a nomen dubium. In 2018, Brownstein stated that a tibia of L. macropus catalogued as specimen AMNH FARB 2550 represents a tyrannosauroid that probably was distinct from Dryptosaurus, but not sufficiently to base a taxon on.

=== That Which Cannot Be Named ===
"That Which Cannot Be Named" is the name given by Darren Naish to an undescribed associated skeleton of a small coelurosaur from the Wessex Formation of the Isle of Wight. The specimen is in private ownership and is currently inaccessible to researchers. It has been suggested that the specimen is possibly a tyrannosauroid.

=== Tiantaisaurus ===
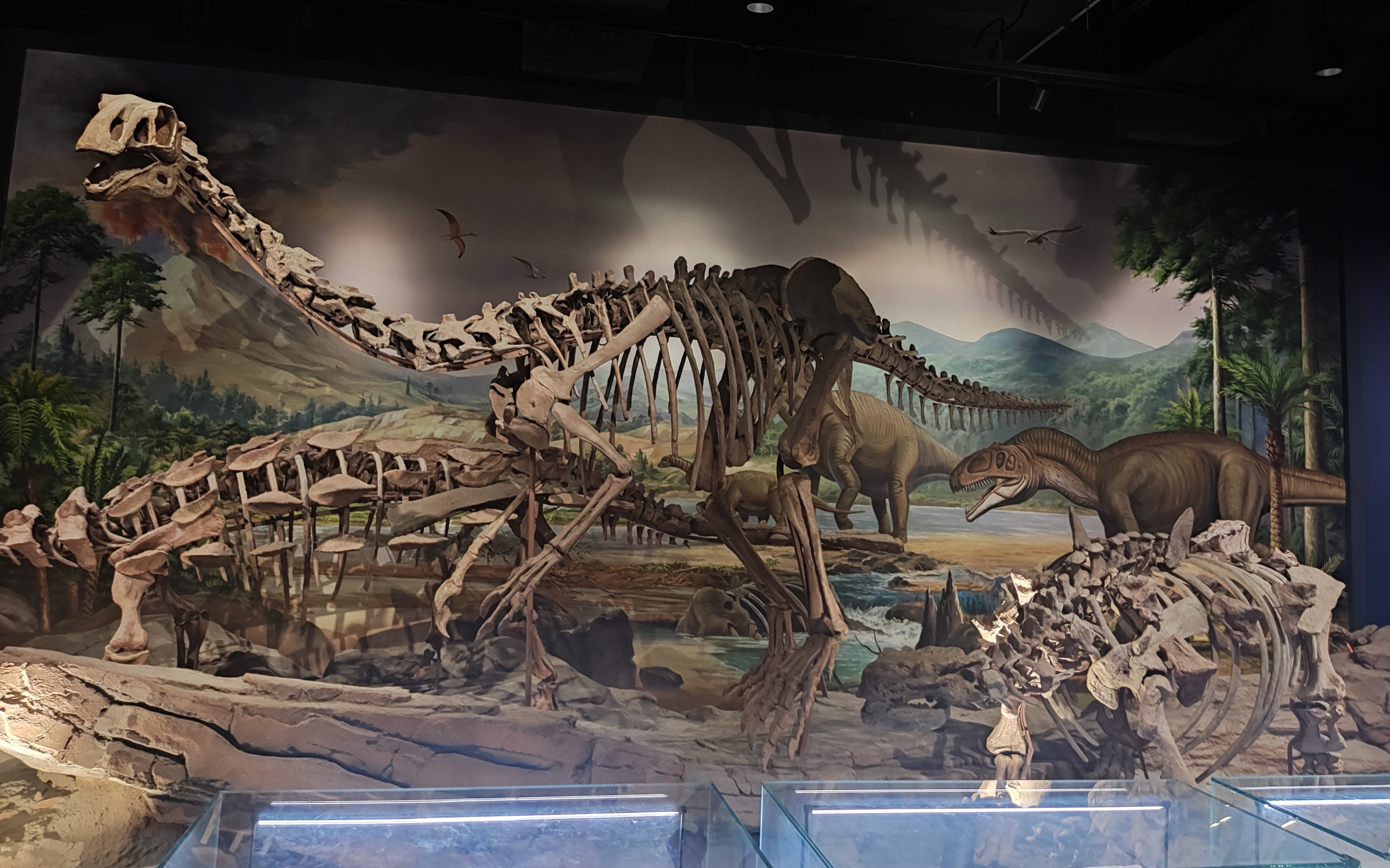
Reconstructed skeleton of "Tiantaisaurus"

"Tiantaisaurus", alternatively spelled "Tiantaiosaurus", is the name given to a specimen of therizinosaur from the Aptian age Laijia Formation of Zhejiang, China. According to correspondence through the Dinosaur Mailing List, the former name (from a 2012 study) was the one intended to be use for an official description. After being discovered in 2005, it was first mentioned named in an unpublished manuscript written in 2007. The given species was named "T. sifengensis". The specimen consists of an ischium, an astragalus, a tibia, a femur, an incomplete pubis and ilium, and a large number of vertebrae from across the body.

=== Toba dinosaur ===
"Toba dinosaur" (called Toba-Ryu in Japan) is the informal name given to an as-yet-undescribed genus of titanosauriform sauropod from the Lower Cretaceous (Hauterivian–Barremian) Matsuo Group of Japan. It was discovered in July 1996 at Toba, Mie Prefecture, Japan. The skeleton comprises four partial caudal vertebrae, right and left humeri, right and left femora, and fragments of a possible left radius, right tibia, right fibula, and left ischium. Other fragmentary bones cannot be attributed to specific positions. Tomida and Tsumura (2006) suggested the "Toba dinosaur" belongs to a new genus and species of Titanosauria.

=== Tonouchisaurus ===
"Tonouchisaurus" (meaning "Tonouchi lizard") is the informal name given to an as yet undescribed genus of coelurosaurian dinosaur from the Early Cretaceous Period of Mongolia. The suggested "type species", "Tonouchisaurus mongoliensis", was first informally mentioned in a Japanese news article. It was notably small: less than 0.91 m (3 ft) in length. The specimen informally dubbed "Tonouchisaurus mongoliensis" is based on limb material, and the manual and pedal remains were initially reported to incorporate a complete didactyl manus and complete pes. Rinchen Barsbold therefore initially interpreted "Tonouchisaurus" as a tyrannosauroid, but he later noted that the manus is actually tridactyl and that the pes has a sub-arcometatarsalian condition.

== U ==
=== Ubirajara ===
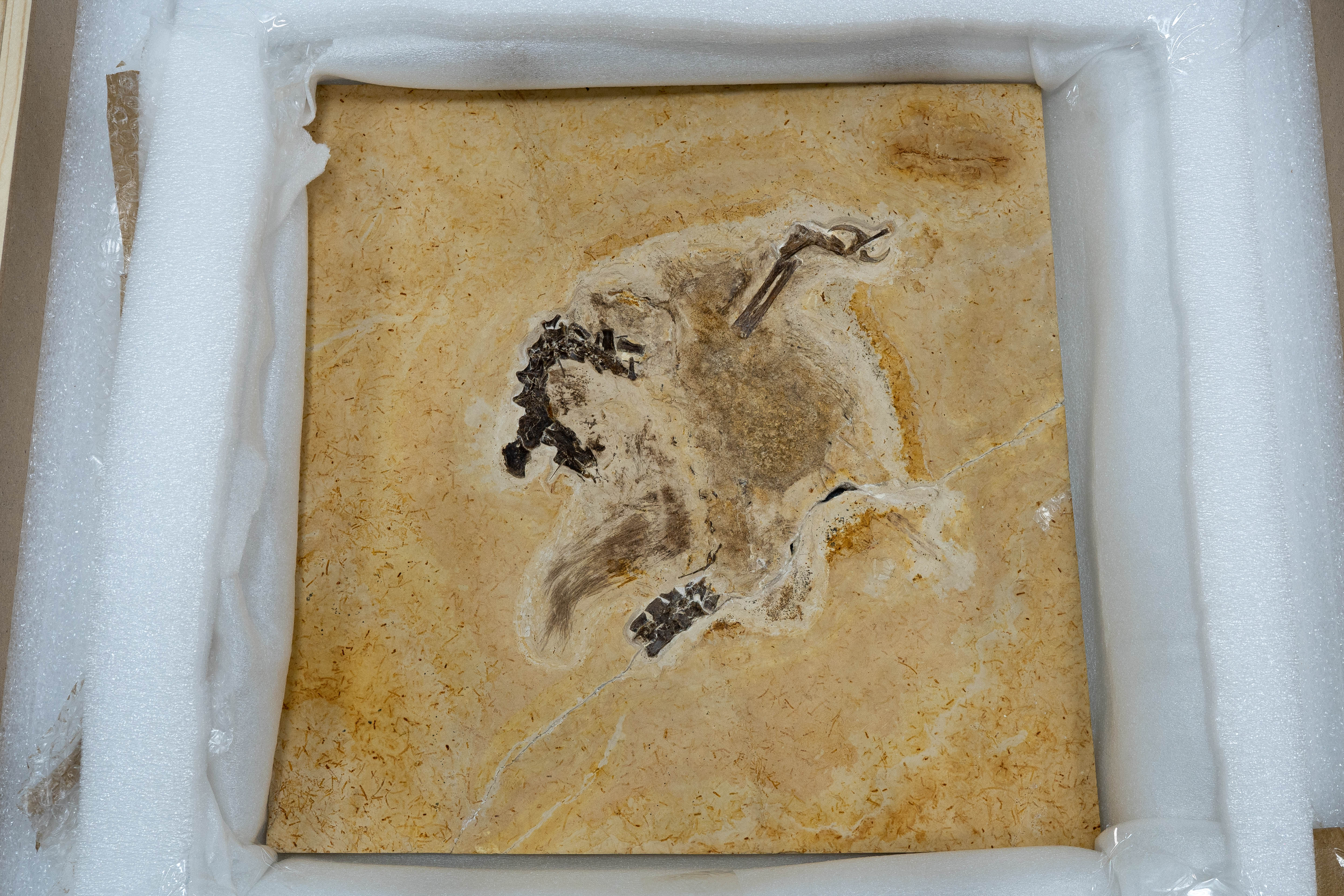
Holotype of "Ubirajara jubatus"

"Ubirajara" (meaning "lord of the spear") is an informal genus of compsognathid theropod known from the Early Cretaceous Crato Formation of Brazil; it was discovered in 1995 and was named in 2020 in an "In Press" article that was later withdrawn due to the specimen having been illegally smuggled from Brazil to Germany. It is considered a nomen manuscriptum.

== V ==
=== Vectensia ===
In 1982 Justin Delair informally named the genus "Vectensia" based on specimen GH 981.45, an armour plate. Like the holotype of Polacanthus, it was found at Barnes High, but reportedly in an older layer, of the Lower Wessex Formation. Blows in 1987 tentatively referred it to Polacanthus.

=== Vitakridrinda ===
"Vitakridrinda" is a genus of abelisaurid theropod dinosaur from the Late Cretaceous of Balochistan, western Pakistan. The intended type species is "V. sulaimani". The discovery was made (along with other dinosaur specimens) near Vitariki by a team of palaeontologists from the Geological Survey of Pakistan, in rocks from the Maastrichtian-age Vitakri Member of the Pab Formation. Informally named in an abstract by M.S. Malkani in 2004 (to which Malkani [2006] attributes the name), it is based on partial remains including two thigh bones and a tooth. A partial snout and braincase were originally referred to the holotype, and additional vertebrae may also belong to this genus. However, the snout was later reclassified as a new genus of mesoeucrocodylian, "Induszalim", while the braincase was later referred to "Gspsaurus". Thomas Holtz gave a possible length of 6 meters (19.7 feet).

=== Vitakrisaurus ===
"Vitakrisaurus" is a genus of noasaurid theropod dinosaurs represented by only one known species, "Vitakrisaurus saraiki", which is the intended type species. It lived in the late Cretaceous period, approximately 70 million years ago, during the Maastrichtian, in what is today the Indian subcontinent. Its fossils were found in Pakistan's Vitakri Formation. The holotype specimen, MSM-303-2, is a right foot with a seemingly tridactyl form and robust phalanges. It may belong to Noasauridae due to similarities with the foot of Velocisaurus, although inconsistencies within its brief description and a lack of comparison with other theropods within the article makes formal classification difficult. The generic name references the Vitakri Member of the Pab Formation and combines this with the Greek suffix "saurus", meaning "reptile". The specific name honours the Saraiki people, who primarily live in southern Pakistan.

== W ==
=== White Rock spinosaurid ===
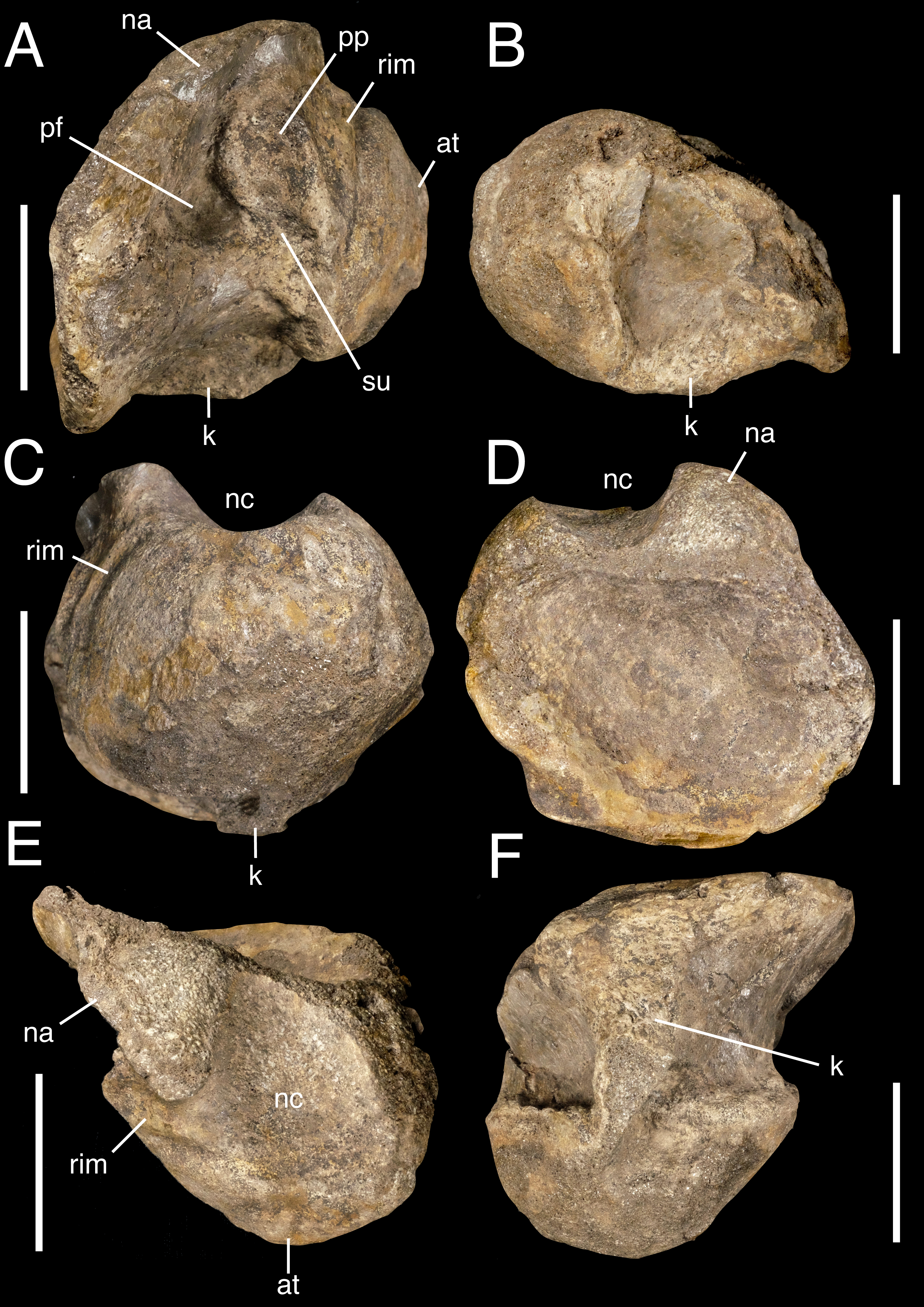
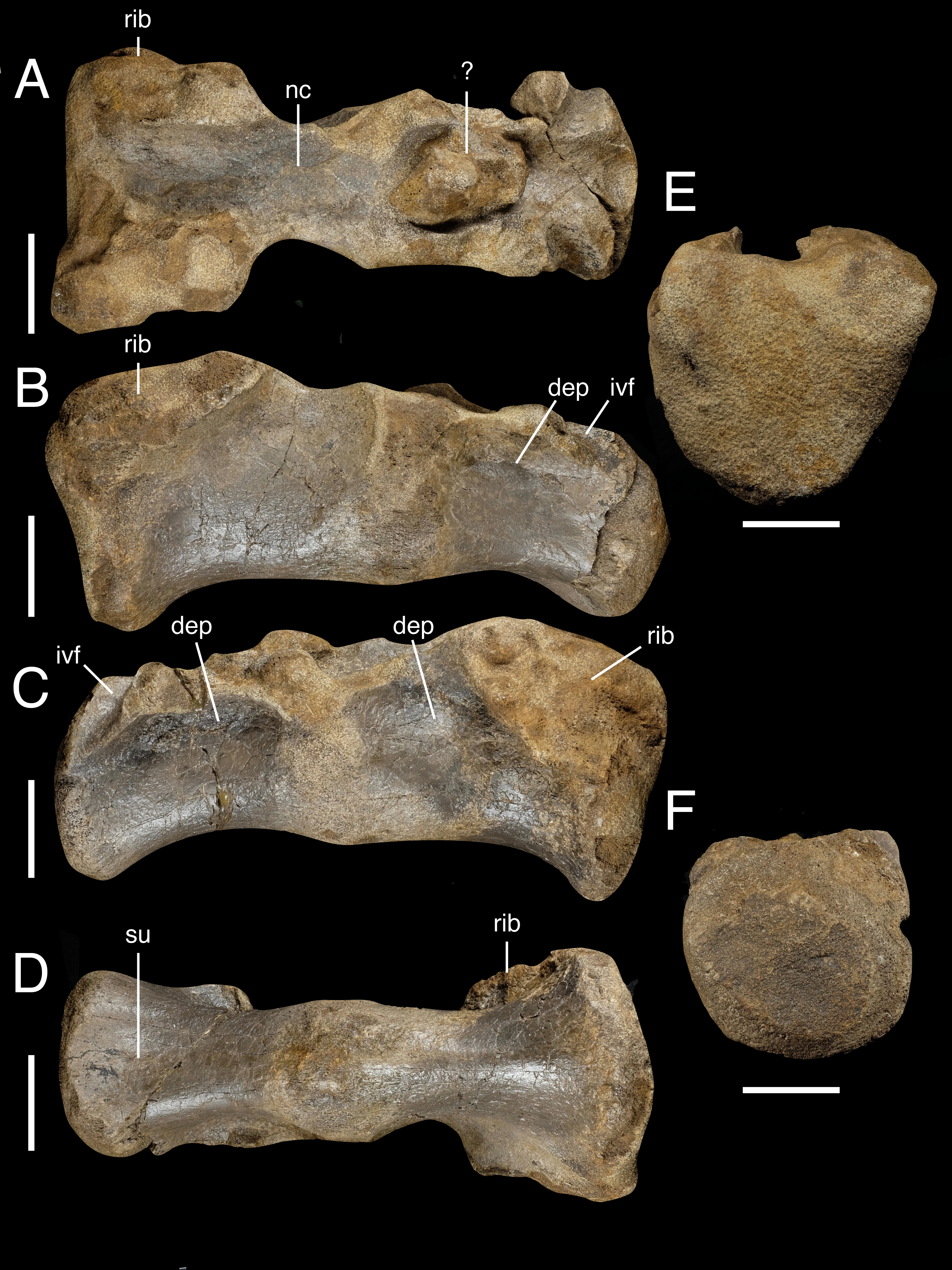
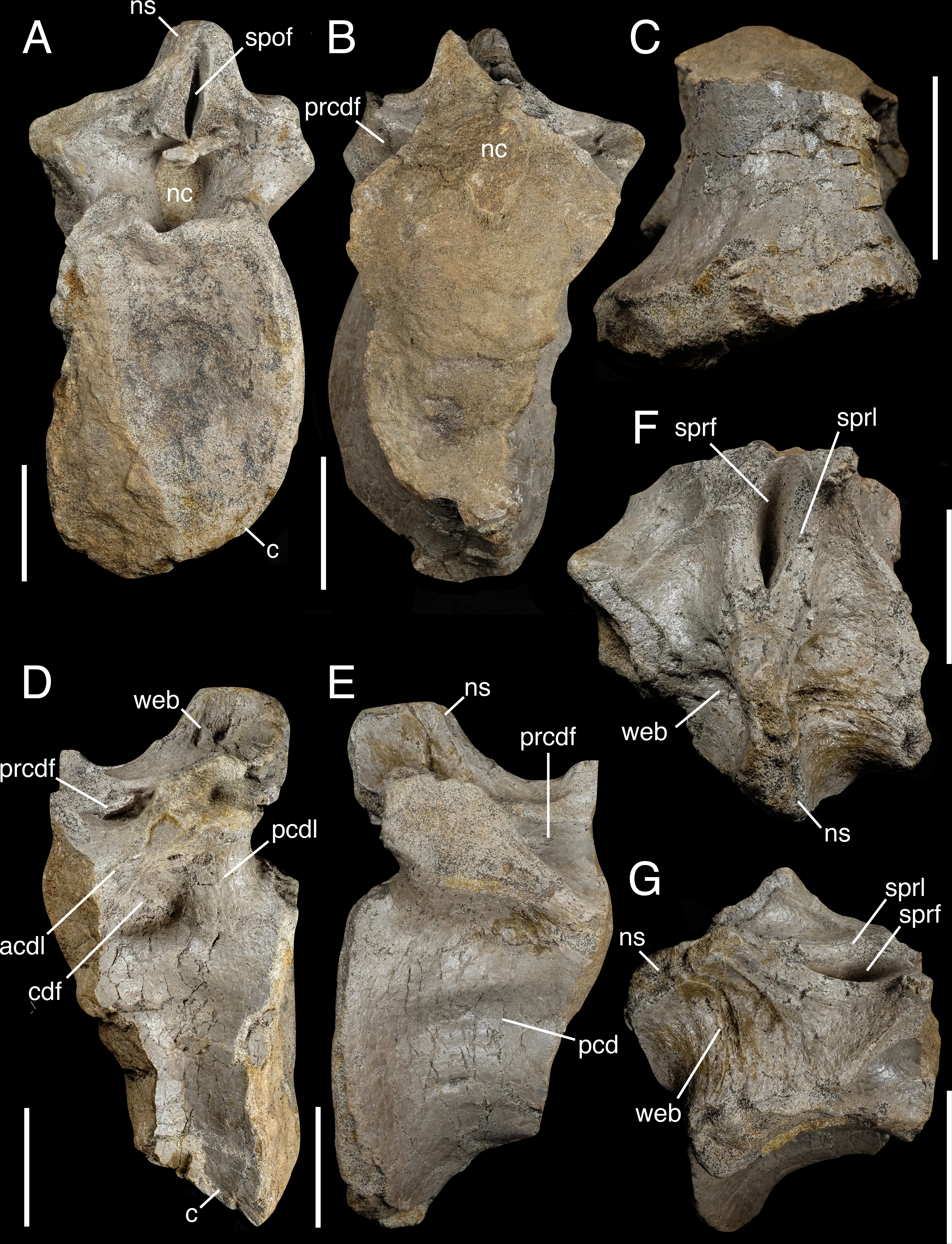
Bones of the White Rock spinosaurid

"White Rock spinosaurid" is the nickname of a giant spinosaur from the Vectis Formation of the Isle of Wight described in 2022. Its remains are so fragmentary that the describers refrained from naming it, but considered the name "Vectispinus". With vertebrae comparable in dimensions to Spinosaurus, it was likely among the largest theropods with a length exceeding 10 metres (33 ft).

=== Wyomingraptor ===
"Wyomingraptor" is the name given to an undiagnostic allosaurid specimen from the Late Jurassic Morrison Formation that is comparatively robust. It was named by an anonymous author in 1997 and is a nomen nudum.

== X ==
=== Xinghesaurus ===
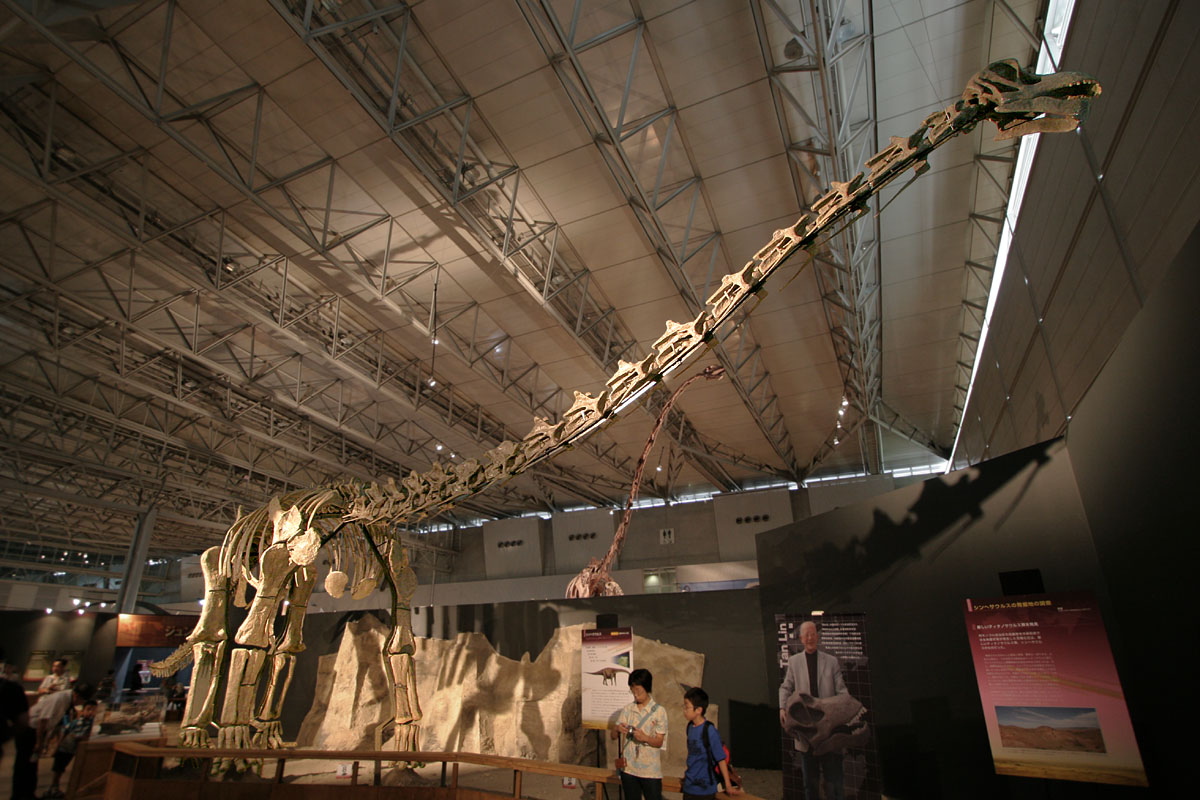
Skeletal mount of "Xinghesaurus" from a Japanese fossil expo

"Xinghesaurus" was the name given to a species of sauropod dinosaur, possibly a titanosauriform, in 2009, in the guidebook for the dinosaur expo "Miracle of Deserts", written by Hasegawa et al. No species name was given for the genus. Based on the skeletal mount, "Xinghesaurus" was likely around 15.4 metres (51 ft) long and weighed around 6 tonnes (13,000 lb).

== Y ==
=== Yibinosaurus ===
"Yibinosaurus" (meaning "Yibin lizard") is the informal name given to an as yet undescribed genus of herbivorous dinosaur from the Early Jurassic. It was a sauropod which lived in what is now Sichuan, China. The suggested "type species", "Yibinosaurus zhoui", is briefly mentioned in the Chongqing Natural History Museum guidebook (2001) as under description by Chinese paleontologist Ouyang Hui. It was coined as a nomen ex dissertationae by Ouyang (2003), and is based on a specimen referred to Gongxianosaurus sp. nov. by Luo and Wang (1999).

=== Yunxianosaurus ===
"Yunxianosaurus" is the provisional name for a genus of titanosaurian dinosaurs from the Late Cretaceous of what is now Hubei, China. The type species, "Yunxianosaurus hubeinensis", was proposed by Chinese paleontologist Li Zhengqi in 2001. The fossils of "Yunxianosaurus" were found near the Nanyang Prefecture. Li stated that the name "Yunxianosaurus" was a temporary label for ease of description, but that further field work and study of the fossils would be required before the genus could be given an official name.

== Z ==
=== Zamyn Khondt oviraptorid ===
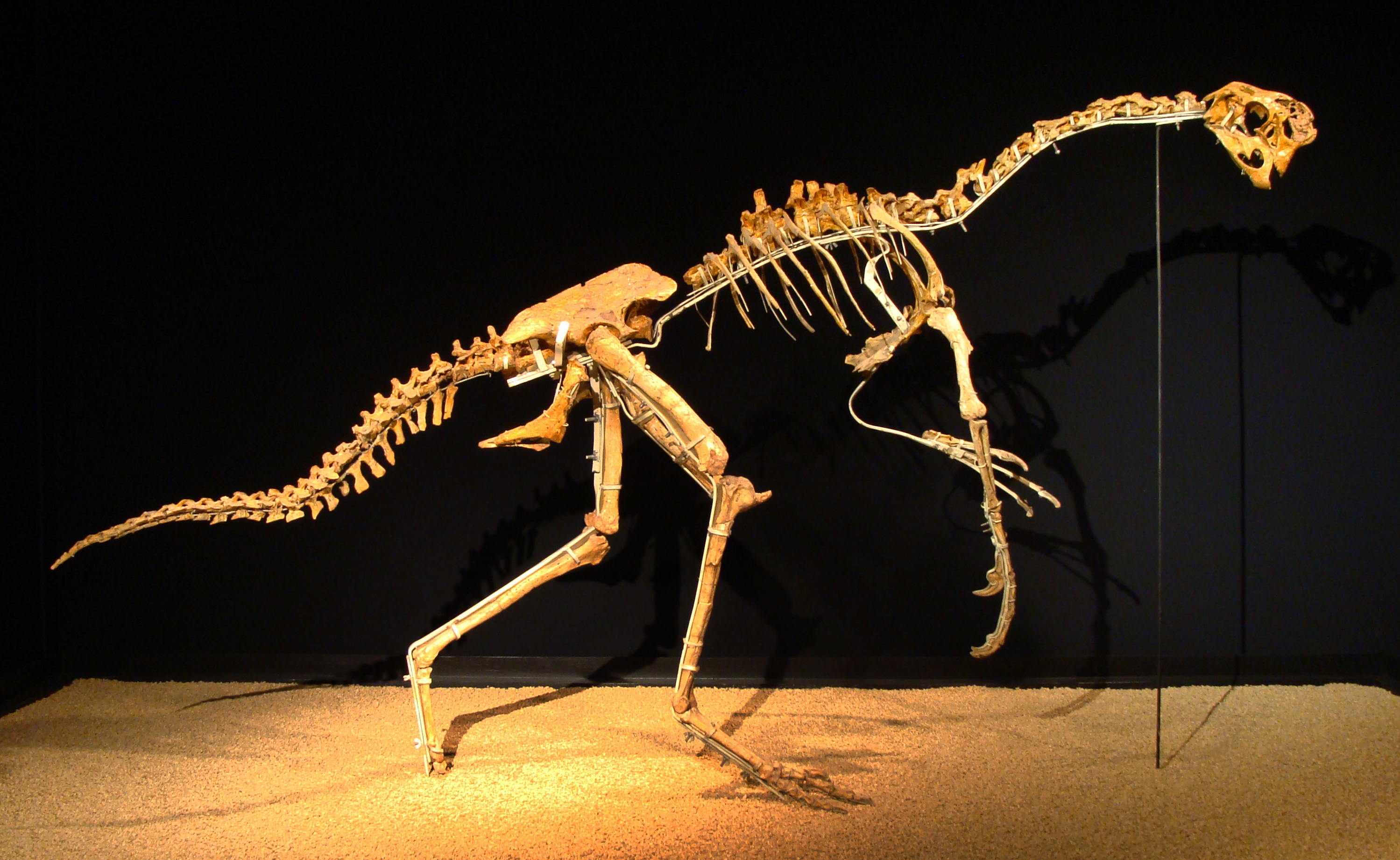
Zamyn Khondt oviraptorid

Zamyn Khondt oviraptorid is a nickname for oviraptorid specimen IGM or GIN 100/42. Since the type skull of Oviraptor is so poorly preserved and crushed, the skull of IGM 100/42 has become the quintessential depiction of that dinosaur, even appearing in scientific papers with the label Oviraptor philoceratops. However, this distinctive-looking, tall-crested species has more features of the skull in common with Citipati than it does with Oviraptor and it may represent a second species of Citipati or possibly an entirely new genus, pending further study.

== See also ==
- List of informally named fossil reptiles
- List of dinosaur genera
