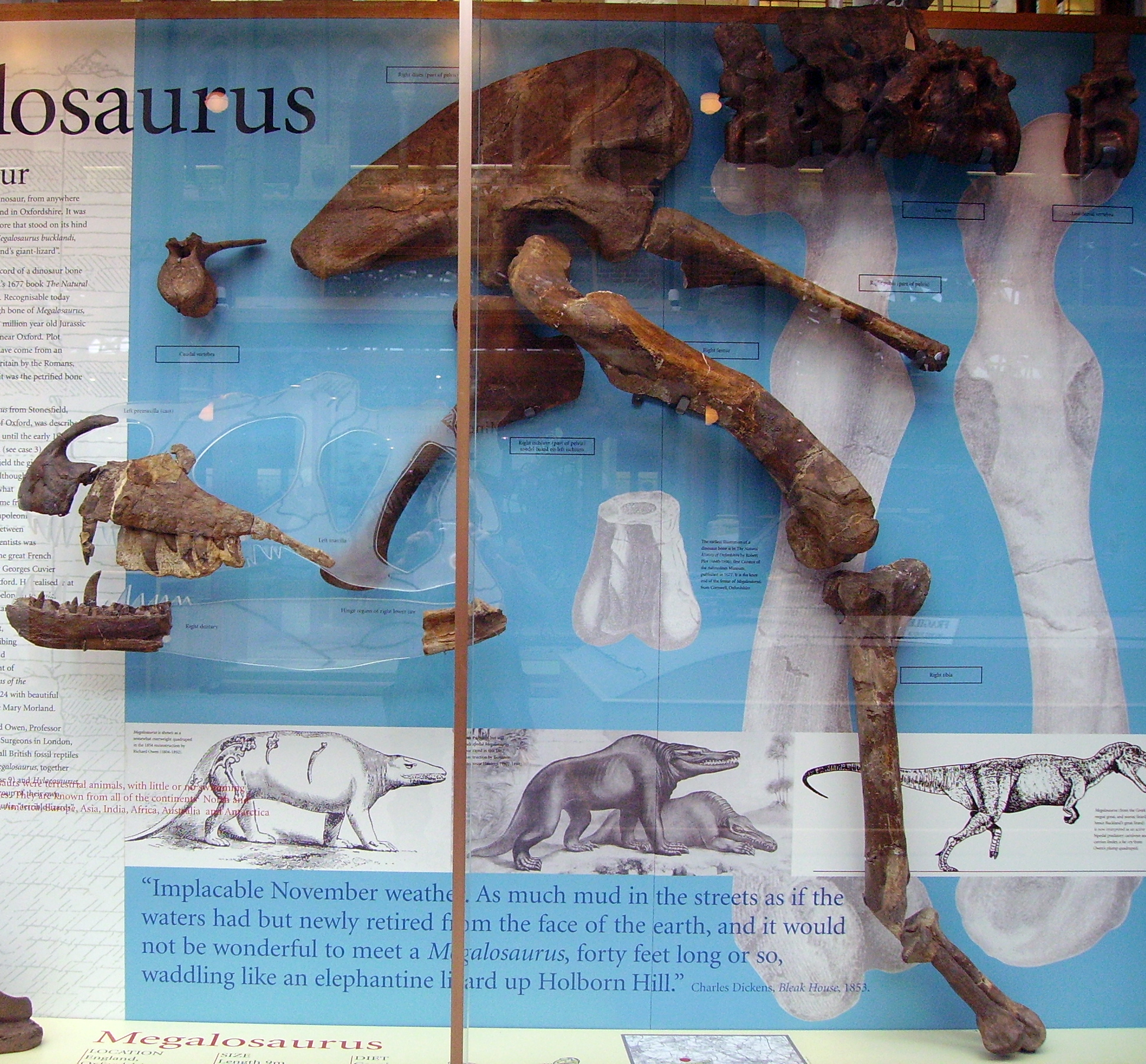
- Fossil specimens referred to M. bucklandii, Oxford University Museum of Natural History. The display shows most of the original syntype series, including the lectotype dentary, identified by Buckland in 1824

Scientific classification
- Kingdom: Animalia
- Phylum: Chordata
- Class: Reptilia
- Clade: Dinosauria
- Clade: Saurischia
- Clade: Theropoda
- Family: †Megalosauridae
- Subfamily: †Megalosaurinae
- Genus: †Megalosaurus; Buckland, 1824
- Species: †M. bucklandii

Binomial name
- †Megalosaurus bucklandii Mantell, 1827

Synonyms
- Megalosaurus bucklandi Meyer, 1832; Megalosaurus conybeari Ritgen, 1826 (nomen oblitum); Scrotum humanum Brookes, 1763 (nomen oblitum)

= Megalosaurus =

Megalosaurus Temporal range: Middle Jurassic (Bathonian), 166–165 Ma

Genus of Jurassic-aged theropod dinosaur

Megalosaurus (meaning "great lizard", from Greek μέγας, megas, meaning 'big', 'tall' or 'great' and σαῦρος, sauros, meaning 'lizard') is an extinct genus of large carnivorous theropod dinosaurs that lived during the Middle Jurassic (Bathonian age, ~166 million years ago) in what is now southern England. Although fossils from other areas have been assigned to the genus, the only certain remains of Megalosaurus come from Oxfordshire and date to the late Middle Jurassic.

The earliest remains of Megalosaurus were described in the 17th century, and were initially interpreted as the remains of elephants or giants. Megalosaurus was named in 1824 by William Buckland, becoming the first genus of dinosaur to be validly named (other than birds, not then recognized as dinosaurs). The type species is M. bucklandii, named in 1827 by Gideon Mantell, after Buckland. In 1842, Megalosaurus was one of three genera on which Richard Owen based his Dinosauria, along with Iguanodon and Hylaeosaurus. On Owen's directions a model was made as one of the Crystal Palace Dinosaurs, which greatly increased the public interest for prehistoric reptiles. Over 50 other species would eventually be classified under the genus; at first, this was because so few types of dinosaur had been identified, but the practice continued even into the 20th century after many other dinosaurs had been discovered. Today it is understood that none of these additional species was directly related to M. bucklandii, which is the only true Megalosaurus species. Because a complete skeleton of it has never been found, much is still unclear about its build.

The first naturalists who investigated Megalosaurus mistook it for a gigantic quadrupedal lizard 20 metres (66 ft) in length. In 1842, Owen concluded that it was no longer than 9 metres (30 ft). Modern scientists were able to obtain a more accurate picture, by comparing Megalosaurus with its direct relatives in the Megalosauridae. Megalosaurus was about 6 metres (20 ft) long, weighing about 700 kilograms (1,500 lb). It was bipedal, walking on stout hindlimbs, its horizontal torso balanced by a horizontal tail. Its forelimbs were short, though very robust. Megalosaurus had a rather large head, equipped with long curved teeth. It was generally a robust and heavily muscled animal.

At the time Megalosaurus lived, Europe formed an island archipelago bounded by then narrow Atlantic Ocean and Tethys Ocean, with Megalosaurus inhabiting an island formed by the London–Brabant Massif, where it is likely to have served as the apex predator of its ecosystem, coexisting with other dinosaurs like the large sauropod Cetiosaurus, stegosaurs, ankylosaurs, and heterodontosaurids.

== Discovery and naming ==
=== Edward Lhuyd's tooth (specimen OU 1328) ===
Possible Megalosaurus tooth OU 1328

In 1699, Edward Lhuyd described what he believed to have been a fish tooth (called Plectronites), later believed to be part of a belemnite, that was illustrated alongside the holotype tooth of the sauropod "Rutellum impicatum" along with another tooth from a theropod. Later studies found that the theropod tooth, known as specimen 1328 (University of Oxford coll. #1328; lost?) almost certainly was a tooth crown that belonged to an unknown species of Megalosaurus. OU 1328 has since been lost and it was not confidently assigned to Megalosaurus until the tooth was re-described by Delair & Sarjeant (2002).

OU 1328 was collected near Caswell, near Witney, Oxfordshire sometime during the 17th century and became the third dinosaur fossil to ever be illustrated, after "Scrotum humanum" in 1677 and "Rutellum impicatum" in 1699.

=== "Scrotum humanum" ===
Megalosaurus may have been the first non-avian dinosaur to be described in the scientific literature. The earliest possible fossil of the genus, from the Taynton Limestone Formation, was the lower part of a femur, discovered in the 17th century. Part of a bone was recovered from the Taynton Limestone Formation of Stonesfield limestone quarry, Oxfordshire in 1676. Sir Thomas Pennyson gave the fragment to naturalist Robert Plot, who published a description and illustration in his Natural History of Oxfordshire in 1676. It was the first illustration of a dinosaur bone published. Plot correctly identified the bone as the lower extremity of the thighbone or femur of a large animal and he recognized that it was too large to belong to any species known to be living in England. He therefore at first concluded it to be the thigh bone of a Roman war elephant and later that of a giant human, such as those mentioned in the Bible. The bone has since been lost, but the illustration is detailed enough that some have since identified it as that of Megalosaurus.

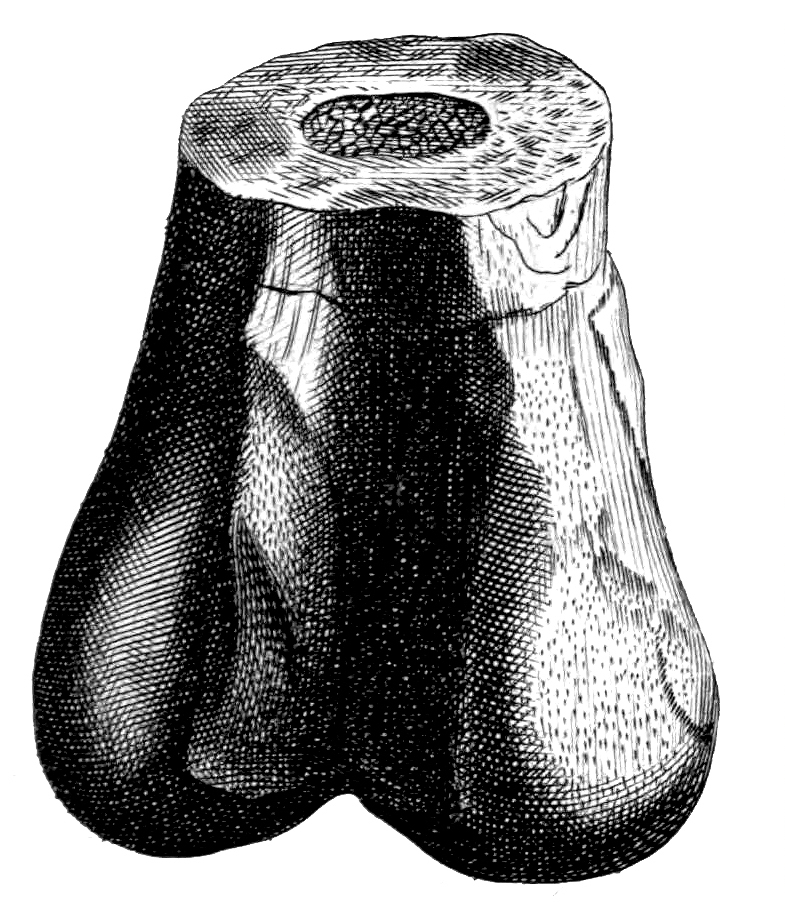
Plot's illustration of the lower extremity of the femur dubbed "Scrotum humanum"

It has also been argued that this possible Megalosaurus bone was given the very first species name ever applied to an extinct dinosaur. Plot's engraving of the Cornwell bone was again used in a book by Richard Brookes in 1763. Brookes, in a caption, called it "Scrotum humanum", apparently comparing its appearance to a pair of "human testicles". However, it is possible that the attribution of this name stemmed from illustrator error, not Richard Brookes. In 1970, paleontologist Lambert Beverly Halstead pointed out that the similarity of Scrotum humanum to a modern species name, a so-called Linnaean "binomen" that has two parts, was not a coincidence. Linnaeus, the founder of modern taxonomy, had in the eighteenth century not merely devised a system for naming living creatures, but also for classifying geological objects. The book by Brookes was all about applying this latter system to curious stones found in England. According to Halstead, Brookes thus had deliberately used binomial nomenclature, and had in fact indicated the possible type specimen of a new biological genus. According to the rules of the International Code of Zoological Nomenclature (ICZN), the name Scrotum humanum in principle had priority over Megalosaurus because it was published first. That Brookes understood that the stone did not actually represent a pair of petrified testicles was irrelevant. Merely the fact that the name had not been used in subsequent literature meant that it could be removed from competition for priority, because the ICZN states that if a name has never been considered valid after 1899, it can be made a nomen oblitum, an invalid "forgotten name".

In 1993, after the death of Halstead, his friend William A.S. Sarjeant submitted a petition to the International Commission on Zoological Nomenclature to formally suppress the name Scrotum in favour of Megalosaurus. He wrote that the supposed junior synonym Megalosaurus bucklandii should be made a conserved name to ensure its priority. However, the Executive Secretary of the ICZN at the time, Philip K. Tubbs, did not consider the petition to be admissible, concluding that the term "Scrotum humanum", published merely as a label for an illustration, did not constitute the valid creation of a new name, and stated that there was no evidence it was ever intended as such. Furthermore, the partial femur was too incomplete to definitely be referred to Megalosaurus and not a different, contemporary theropod.

=== Buckland's research ===
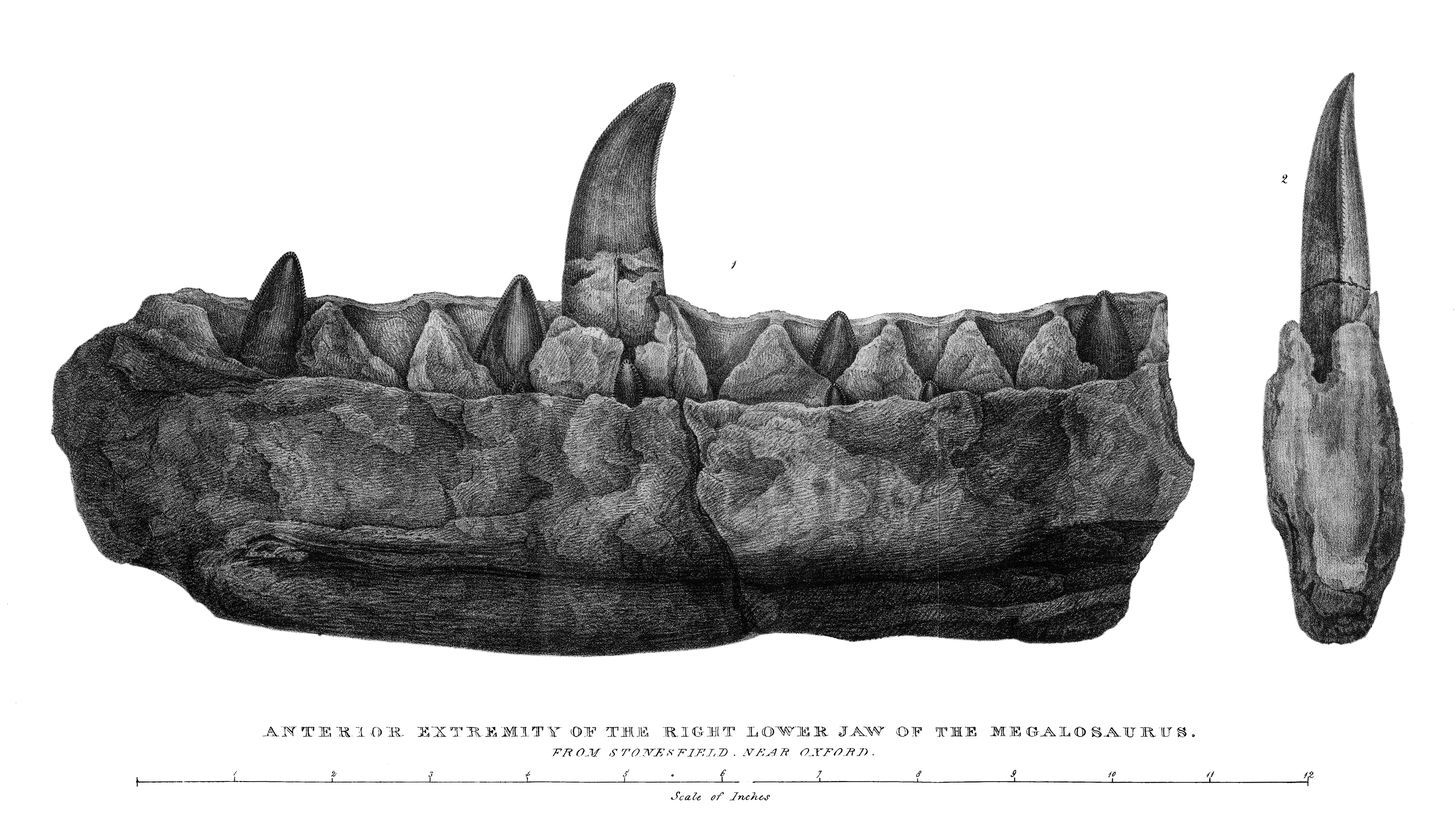
Lithography from William Buckland's "Notice on the Megalosaurus or great Fossil Lizard of Stonesfield", 1824. Caption reads "anterior extremity of the right lower jaw of the Megalosaurus from Stonesfield near Oxford".

During the last part of the eighteenth century, the number of fossils in British collections quickly increased. According to a hypothesis published by science historian Robert Gunther in 1925, among them was a partial lower jaw of Megalosaurus. It was discovered about 40 feet (12 m) underground in a Stonesfield Slate mine during the early 1790s and was acquired in October 1797 by Christopher Pegge for 10s.6d. and added to the collection of the Anatomy School of Christ Church, Oxford.

In the early nineteenth century, more discoveries were made. In 1815, John Kidd reported the find of bones of giant tetrapods, again at the Stonesfield quarry. The layers there are currently considered part of the Taynton Limestone Formation, dating to the mid-Bathonian stage of the Jurassic Period. The bones were apparently acquired by William Buckland, Professor of Geology at the University of Oxford and fellow of Corpus Christi. Buckland also studied a lower jaw, according to Gunther the one bought by Pegge. Buckland did not know to what animal the bones belonged but, in 1818, after the Napoleonic Wars, the French comparative anatomist Georges Cuvier visited Buckland in Oxford and realized that they were those of a giant lizard-like creature. Buckland further studied the remains with Mary Morland (later his wife), and his friend William Conybeare who in 1821 referred to them as the "Huge Lizard". In 1822 Buckland and Conybeare, in a joint article to be included in Cuvier's Ossemens, intended to provide scientific names for both gigantic lizard-like creatures known at the time: the remains found near Maastricht would be named Mosasaurus – then seen as a land-dwelling animal – while for the British lizard Conybeare had devised the name "Megalosaurus", from the Greek μέγας, megas, "large". That year a publication failed to occur, but the physician James Parkinson already in 1822 announced the name "Megalosaurus", illustrating one of the teeth and revealing the creature was 40 feet long and eight feet high. It is generally considered that the name in 1822 was still a nomen nudum ("naked name"). Buckland, urged on by an impatient Cuvier, continued to work on the subject during 1823. Mary provided drawings of the bones, that were to be the basis of illustrating lithographies. Finally, on 20 February 1824, during the same meeting of the Geological Society of London in which Conybeare described a very complete specimen of Plesiosaurus, Buckland formally announced Megalosaurus. The descriptions of the bones in the Transactions of the Geological Society, in 1824, constitute a valid publication of the name. Megalosaurus was the first non-avian dinosaur genus named; the first of which the remains had with certainty been scientifically described was Streptospondylus, in 1808 by Cuvier.

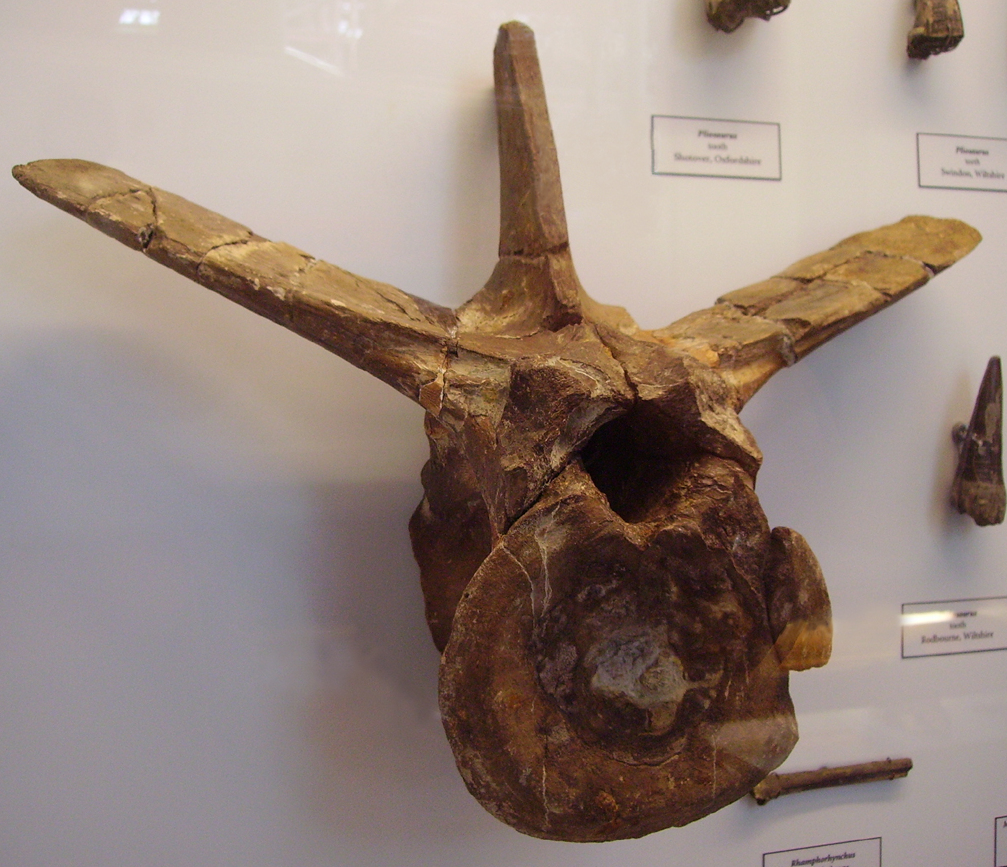
Referred tail vertebra, NHMUK PV R9672. The top of its neural spine has broken off, which would have been about twice as long

By 1824, the material available to Buckland consisted of specimen OUM J13505, a piece of a right lower jaw with a single erupted tooth; OUM J13577, a posterior dorsal vertebra; OUM J13579, an anterior caudal vertebra; OUM J13576, a sacrum of five sacral vertebrae; OUM J13585, a cervical rib; OUM J13580, a rib; OUM J29881, an ilium of the pelvis, OUM J13563, a piece of the pubic bone; OUM J13565, a part of the ischium; OUM J13561, a thigh bone and OUM J13572, the lower part of a second metatarsal. As he himself was aware, these did not all belong to the same individual; only the sacrum was articulated. Because they represented several individuals, the described fossils formed a syntype series. By modern standards, from these a single specimen has to be selected to serve as the type specimen on which the name is based. In 1990, Ralph Molnar chose the famous dentary (front part of the lower jaw), OUM J13505, as such a lectotype. Because he was unaccustomed to the deep dinosaurian pelvis, much taller than with typical reptiles, Buckland misidentified several bones, interpreting the pubic bone as a fibula and mistaking the ischium for a clavicle. Buckland identified the organism as being a giant animal belonging to the Sauria – the Lizards, at the time seen as including the crocodiles - and he placed it in the new genus Megalosaurus, repeating an estimate by Cuvier that the largest pieces he described, indicated an animal 12 meters long in life.

=== Etymology ===
Buckland had not provided a specific name, as was not uncommon in the early nineteenth century, when the genus was still seen as the more essential concept. In 1826, Ferdinand von Ritgen gave this dinosaur a complete binomial, Megalosaurus conybeari, which however was not much used by later authors and is now considered a nomen oblitum. A year later, in 1827, Gideon Mantell included Megalosaurus in his geological survey of southeastern England, and assigned the species its current valid binomial name, Megalosaurus bucklandii. Until recently, the form Megalosaurus bucklandi was often used, a variant first published in 1832 by Christian Erich Hermann von Meyer – and sometimes erroneously ascribed to von Ritgen – but the more original M. bucklandii has priority.

=== Early reconstructions ===
1854 reconstruction in Crystal Palace Park guided by Richard Owen presents Megalosaurus as a quadruped; modern reconstructions make it bipedal, like most theropods

The first reconstruction was given by Buckland himself. He considered Megalosaurus to be a quadruped. He thought it was an "amphibian", i.e. an animal capable of both swimming in the sea and walking on land. Generally, in his mind Megalosaurus resembled a gigantic lizard, but Buckland already understood from the form of the thigh bone head that the legs were not so much sprawling as held rather upright. In the original description of 1824, Buckland repeated Cuvier's size estimate that Megalosaurus would have been 40 feet long with the weight of a seven foot tall elephant. However, this had been based on the remains present at Oxford. Buckland had also been hurried into naming his new reptile by a visit he had made to the fossil collection of Mantell, who during the lecture announced to have acquired a fossil thigh bone of enormous magnitude, twice as long as that just described. Today, this is known to have belonged to Iguanodon, or at least some iguanodontid, but at the time both men assumed this bone belonged to Megalosaurus also. Even taking into account the effects of allometry, heavier animals having relatively stouter bones, Buckland was forced in the printed version of his lecture to estimate the maximum length of Megalosaurus at 60 to 70 feet. The existence of Megalosaurus posed some problems for Christian orthodoxy, which typically held that suffering and death had only come into the world through Original Sin, which seemed irreconcilable with the presence of a gigantic devouring reptile during a pre-Adamitic phase of history. Buckland rejected the usual solution, that such carnivores would originally have been peaceful vegetarians, as infantile and claimed in one of the Bridgewater Treatises that Megalosaurus had played a beneficial role in creation by ending the lives of old and ill animals, "to diminish the aggregate amount of animal suffering".

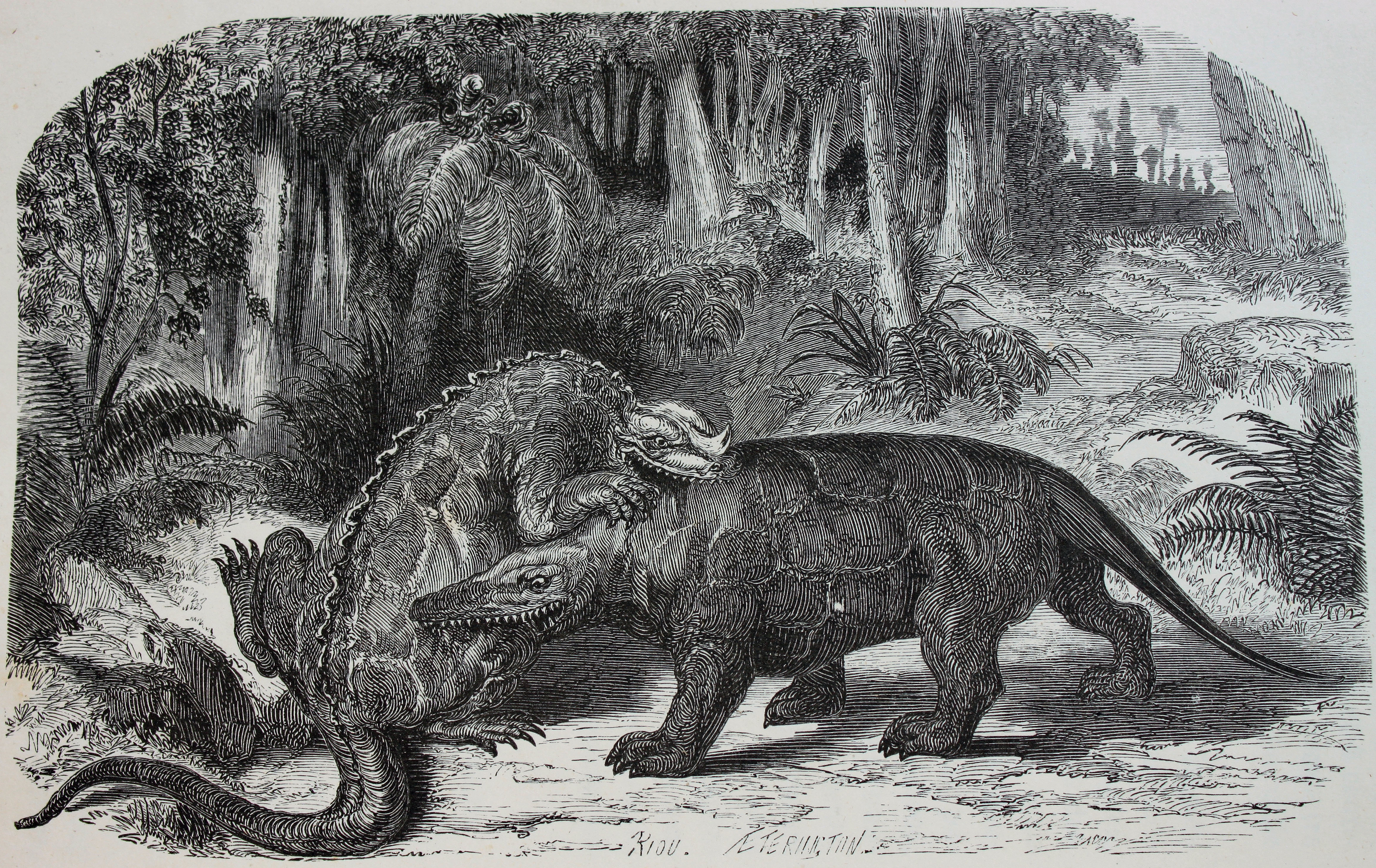
Édouard Riou's 1863 depiction of herbivore Iguanodon battling Megalosaurus

Around 1840, it became fashionable in England to espouse the concept of the transmutation of species as part of a general progressive development through time, as expressed in the work of Robert Chambers. In reaction, on 2 August 1841 Richard Owen during a lecture to the British Association for the Advancement of Science claimed that certain prehistoric reptilian groups had already attained the organisational level of present mammals, implying there had been no progress. Owen presented three examples of such higher level reptiles: Iguanodon, Hylaeosaurus and Megalosaurus. For these, the "lizard model" was entirely abandoned: they would have had an upright stance and a high metabolism. This also meant that earlier size estimates had been exaggerated. By simply adding the known length of the vertebrae, instead of extrapolating from a lizard, Owen arrived at a total body length for Megalosaurus of 30 feet. In the printed version of the lecture published in 1842, Owen united the three reptiles into a separate group: the Dinosauria. Megalosaurus was thus one of the three original dinosaurs.

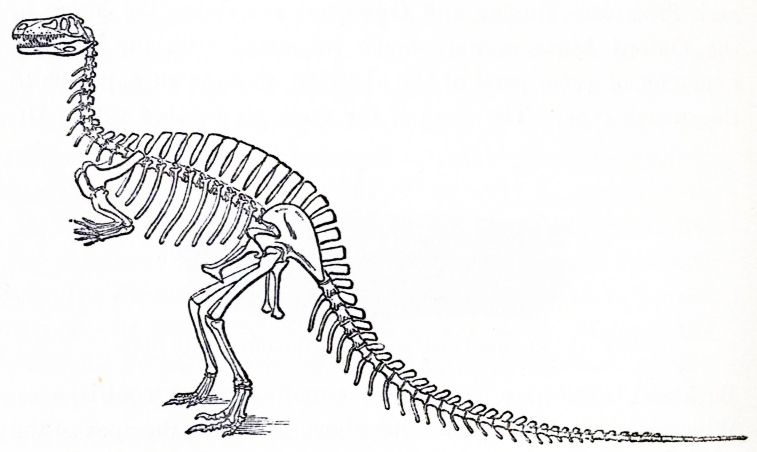
Von Meyer's restoration of Megalosaurus from before 1897; showing it bipedal with long neural spines

In 1852, Benjamin Waterhouse Hawkins was commissioned to build a life-sized concrete model of Megalosaurus for the exhibition of prehistoric animals at the Crystal Palace Park in Sydenham, where it remains to this day. Hawkins worked under the direction of Owen and the statue reflected Owen's ideas that Megalosaurus would have been a mammal-like quadruped. The sculpture in Crystal Palace Park shows a conspicuous hump on the shoulders and it has been suggested this was inspired by a set of high vertebral spines acquired by Owen in the early 1850s. Today, they are seen as a separate genus Becklespinax, but Owen referred them to Megalosaurus. The models at the exhibition created a general public awareness for the first time, at least in England, that ancient reptiles had existed.

The presumption that carnivorous dinosaurs, like Megalosaurus, were quadrupeds was first challenged by the find of Compsognathus in 1859. That, however, was a very small animal, the significance of which for gigantic forms could be denied. In 1870, near Oxford, the type specimen of Eustreptospondylus was discovered – the first reasonably intact skeleton of a large theropod. It was clearly bipedal. Shortly afterwards, John Phillips created the first public display of a theropod skeleton in Oxford, arranging the known Megalosaurus bones, held by recesses in cardboard sheets, in a more or less natural position. During the 1870s, North American discoveries of large theropods, like Allosaurus, confirmed that they were bipedal. The Oxford University Museum of Natural History display contains most of the specimens from the original description by Buckland.

=== Later finds of Megalosaurus bucklandii ===
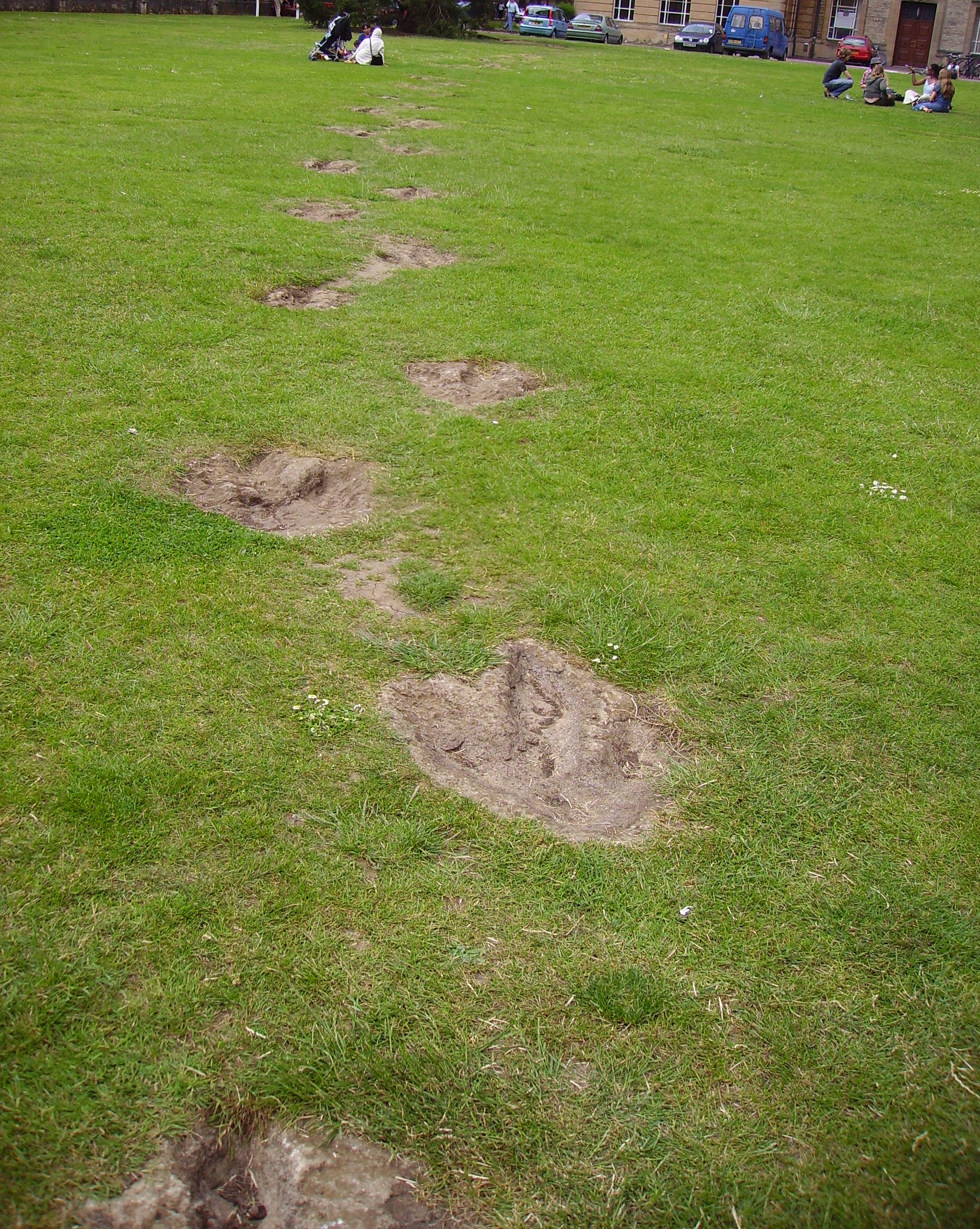
Replica of theropod footprints attributed to Megalosaurus at the Oxford University Museum of Natural History.

The quarries at Stonesfield, which were worked until 1911, continued to produce Megalosaurus bucklandii fossils, mostly single bones from the pelvis and hindlimbs. Vertebrae and skull bones are rare. In 2010, Roger Benson counted a total of 103 specimens from the Stonesfield Slate, from a minimum of seven individuals. It has been contentious whether this material represents just a single taxon. In 2004, Julia Day and Paul Barrett claimed that there were two morphotypes present, based on small differences in the thighbones. In 2008 Benson favoured this idea, but in 2010 concluded the differences were illusory. A maxilla fragment, specimen OUM J13506, was, in 1869 assigned, by Thomas Huxley, to M. bucklandii. In 1992 Robert Thomas Bakker claimed it represented a member of the Sinraptoridae; in 2007, Darren Naish thought it was a separate species belonging to the Abelisauroidea. In 2010, Benson pointed out that the fragment was basically indistinguishable from other known M. bucklandii maxillae, to which it had in fact not been compared by the other authors.

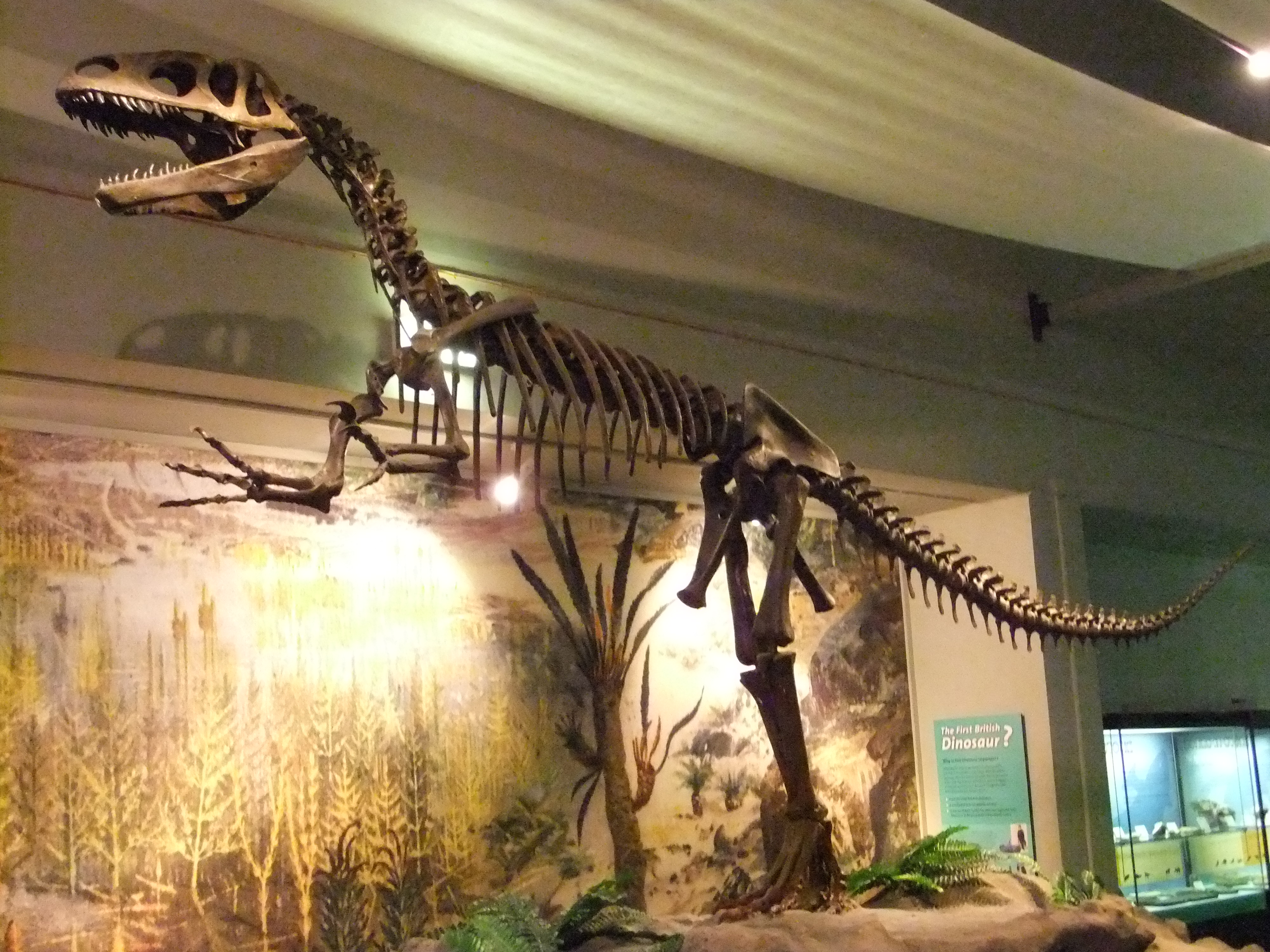
Reconstructed skeleton in World Museum Liverpool

Apart from the finds in the Taynton Limestone Formation, in 1939 Sidney Hugh Reynolds referred remains to Megalosaurus that had been found in the older Chipping Norton Limestone Formation dating from the early Bathonian, about 30 single teeth and bones. Though the age disparity makes it problematic to assume an identity with Megalosaurus bucklandii, in 2009 Benson could not establish any relevant anatomical differences with M. bucklandii among the remains found at one site, the New Park Quarry, and therefore affirmed the reference to that species. However, in another site, the Oakham Quarry, the material contained one bone, an ilium, that was clearly dissimilar.

Sometimes trace fossils have been referred to Megalosaurus or to the ichnogenus Megalosauripus. In 1997, a famous group of fossilized footprints (ichnites) was found in a limestone quarry at Ardley, 20 kilometers northeast of Oxford. They were thought to have been made by Megalosaurus and possibly also some left by Cetiosaurus. There are replicas of some of these footprints, set across the lawn of the Oxford University Museum of Natural History. One track was of a theropod accelerating from walking to running. According to Benson, such referrals are unprovable, as the tracks show no traits unique to Megalosaurus. Certainly they should be limited to finds that are of the same age as Megalosaurus bucklandii. In 2024 five more sets of tracks were discovered at a nearby Bicester quarry, with one of them showing clear features of large tridactyl theropod feet distinctive of Megalosaurus.

Finds from sites outside England, especially in France, have in the nineteenth and twentieth century been referred to M. bucklandii. In 2010 Benson considered these as either clearly different or too fragmentary to establish an identity.

== Description ==
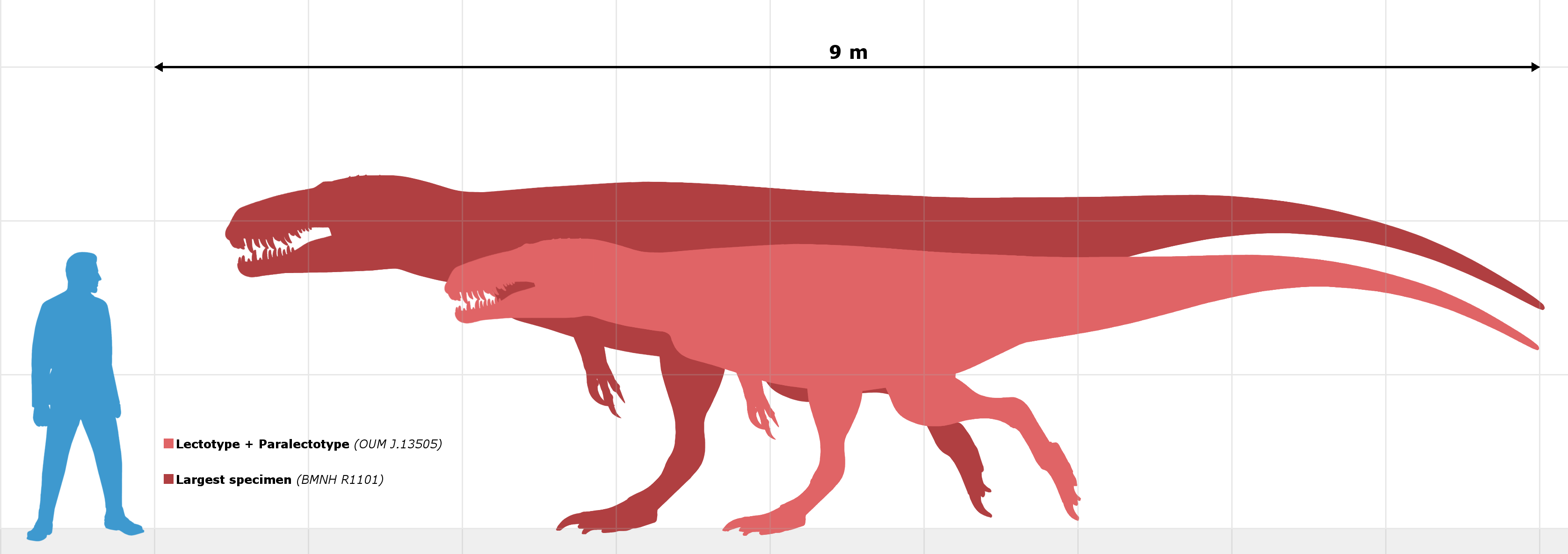
Size comparison (human in blue, lectotype in pink, largest specimen in red)

Since the first finds, many other Megalosaurus bones have been recovered; however, no complete skeleton has yet been found. Therefore, the details of its physical appearance cannot be certain. However, a full osteology of all known material was published in 2010 by Benson.

=== Size and general build ===
Diagram showing known bones; with the lectotype and paralectotype material in white, and elements from other specimens in blue

Traditionally, most texts, following Owen's estimate of 1841, give a body length of 30 feet or nine meters for Megalosaurus. The lack of an articulated dorsal vertebral series makes it difficult to determine an exact size. David Bruce Norman in 1984 thought Megalosaurus was seven to eight meters long. Gregory S. Paul in 1988 estimated the weight tentatively at 1.1 tons, given a thigh bone 76 centimeters long. The trend in the early twenty-first century to limit the material to the lectotype inspired even lower estimates, disregarding outliers of uncertain identity. Paul in 2010 estimated the size of Megalosaurus at 6 meters (20 ft) in length and 700 kilograms (1,500 lb). However, the same year Benson claimed that Megalosaurus, though medium-sized, was still among the largest of Middle Jurassic theropods. Specimen NHMUK PV OR 31806, a thigh bone 803 millimeters long, would indicate a body weight of 943 kilograms, using the extrapolation method of J.F. Anderson - which method, optimized for mammals, tends to underestimate theropod masses by at least a third. Furthermore, thigh bone specimen OUM J13561 has a length of about 86 centimeters.

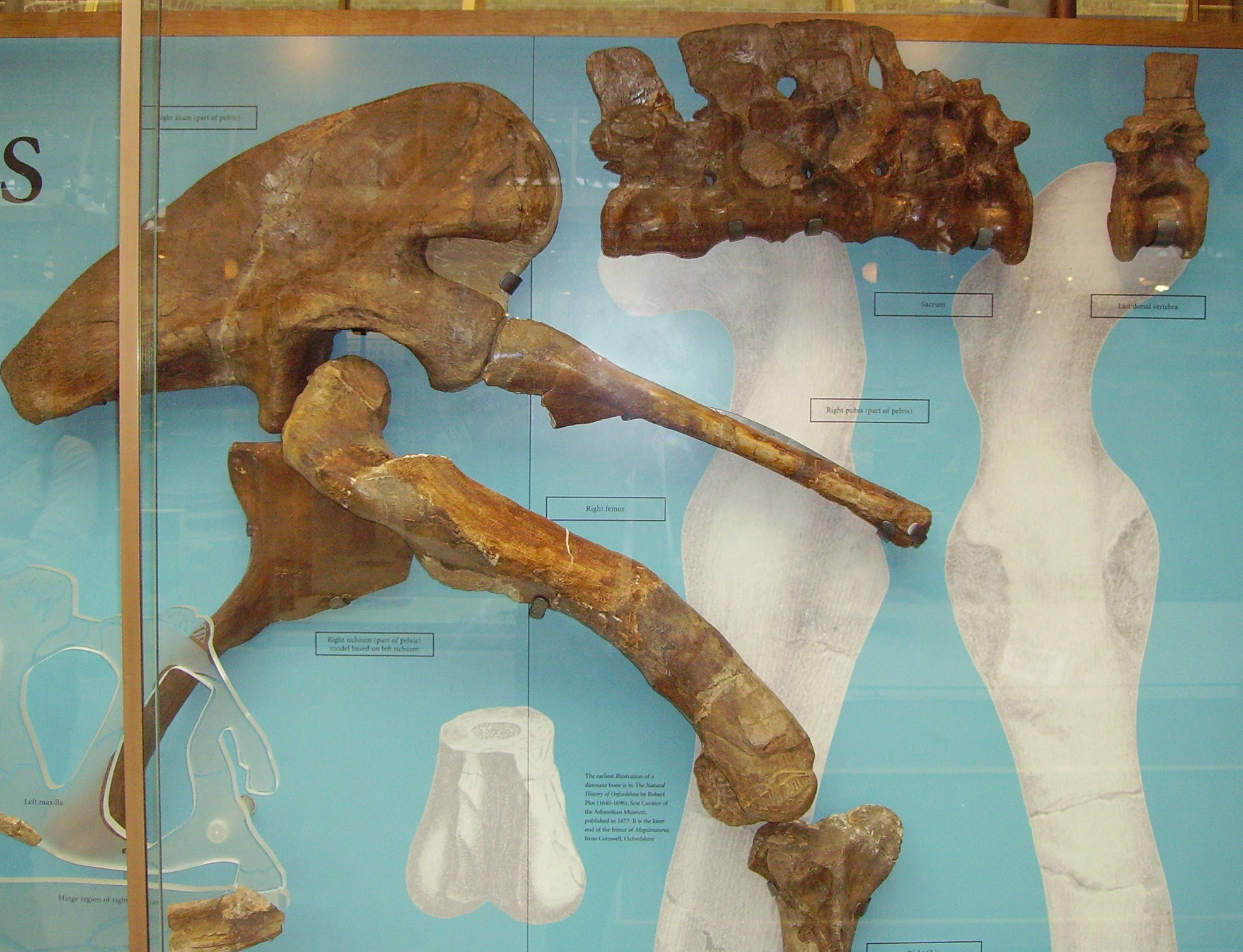
Hip, femur and sacrum

In general, Megalosaurus had the typical build of a large theropod. It was bipedal, the horizontal torso being balanced by a long horizontal tail. The hindlimbs were long and strong with three forward-facing weight-bearing toes, the forelimbs relatively short but exceptionally robust and probably carrying three digits. Being a carnivore, its large elongated head bore long dagger-like teeth to slice the flesh of its prey. The skeleton of Megalosaurus is highly ossified, indicating a robust and muscular animal, though the lower leg was not as heavily built as that of Torvosaurus, a close relative.

=== Skull and lower jaws ===
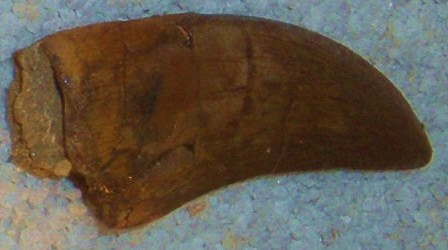
Referred tooth of M. bucklandii

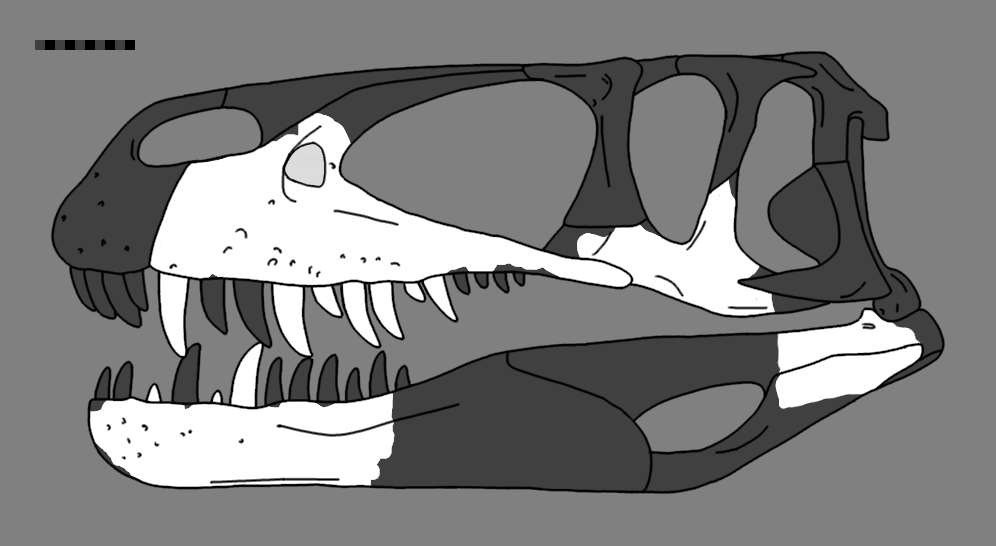
Hypothetical reconstruction of the skull based on its close relative Torvosaurus

The skull of Megalosaurus is poorly known. The discovered skull elements are generally rather large in relation to the rest of the material. This can either be coincidental or indicate that Megalosaurus had an uncommonly large head. The praemaxilla is not known, making it impossible to determine whether the snout profile was curved or rectangular. A rather stubby snout is suggested by the fact that the front branch of the maxilla was short. In the depression around the antorbital fenestra to the front, a smaller non-piercing hollowing can be seen that is probably homologous to the fenestra maxillaris. The maxilla bears 13 teeth. The teeth are relatively large, with a crown length up to seven centimeters. The teeth are supported from behind by tall, triangular, unfused interdental plates. The cutting edges bear 18 to 20 denticula per centimeter. The tooth formula is probably 4, 13-14/13-14. The jugal bone is pneumatized, pierced by a large foramen from the direction of the antorbital fenestra. It was probably hollowed out by an outgrowth of an air sac in the nasal bone. Such a level of pneumatisation of the jugal is not known from other megalosaurids and might represent a separate autapomorphy.

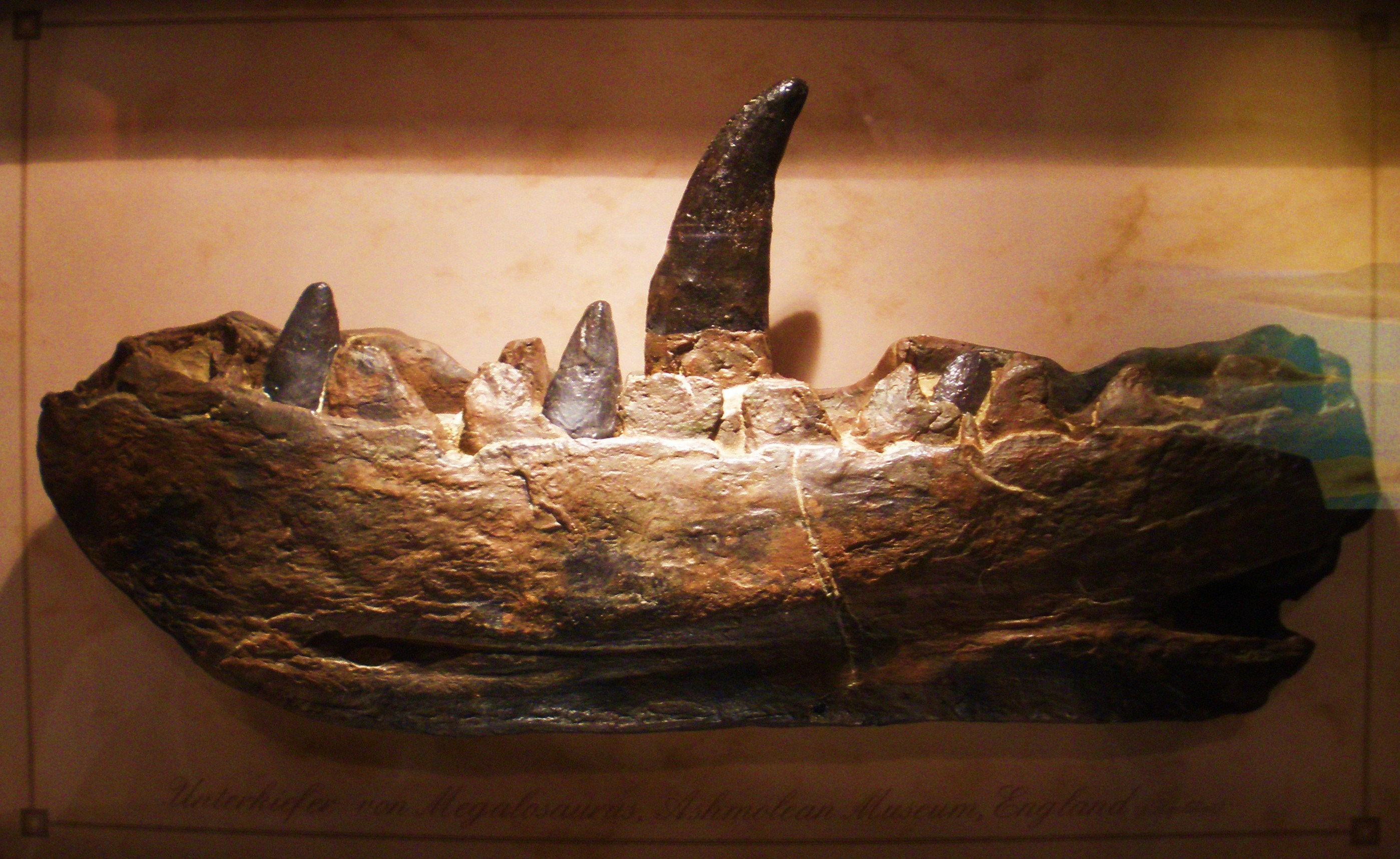
Cast of the lower jaw

The lower jaw is rather robust. It is also straight in top view, without much expansion at the jaw tip, suggesting the lower jaws as a pair, the mandibula, were narrow. Several traits in 2008 identified as autapomorphies, later transpired to have been the result of damage. However, a unique combination of traits is present in the wide longitudinal groove on the outer side (shared with Torvosaurus), the small third dentary tooth and a vascular channel, below the row of interdental plates, that only is closed from the fifth tooth position onwards. The number of dentary teeth was probably 13 or 14, though the preserved damaged specimens show at most 11 tooth sockets. The interdental plates have smooth inner sides, whereas those of the maxilla are vertically grooved; the same combination is shown by Piatnitzkysaurus. The surangular has no bony shelf, or even ridge, on its outer side. There is laterally an oval opening present in front of the jaw joint, a foramen surangulare posterior, but a second foramen surangulare anterior to the front of it is lacking.

=== Vertebral column ===
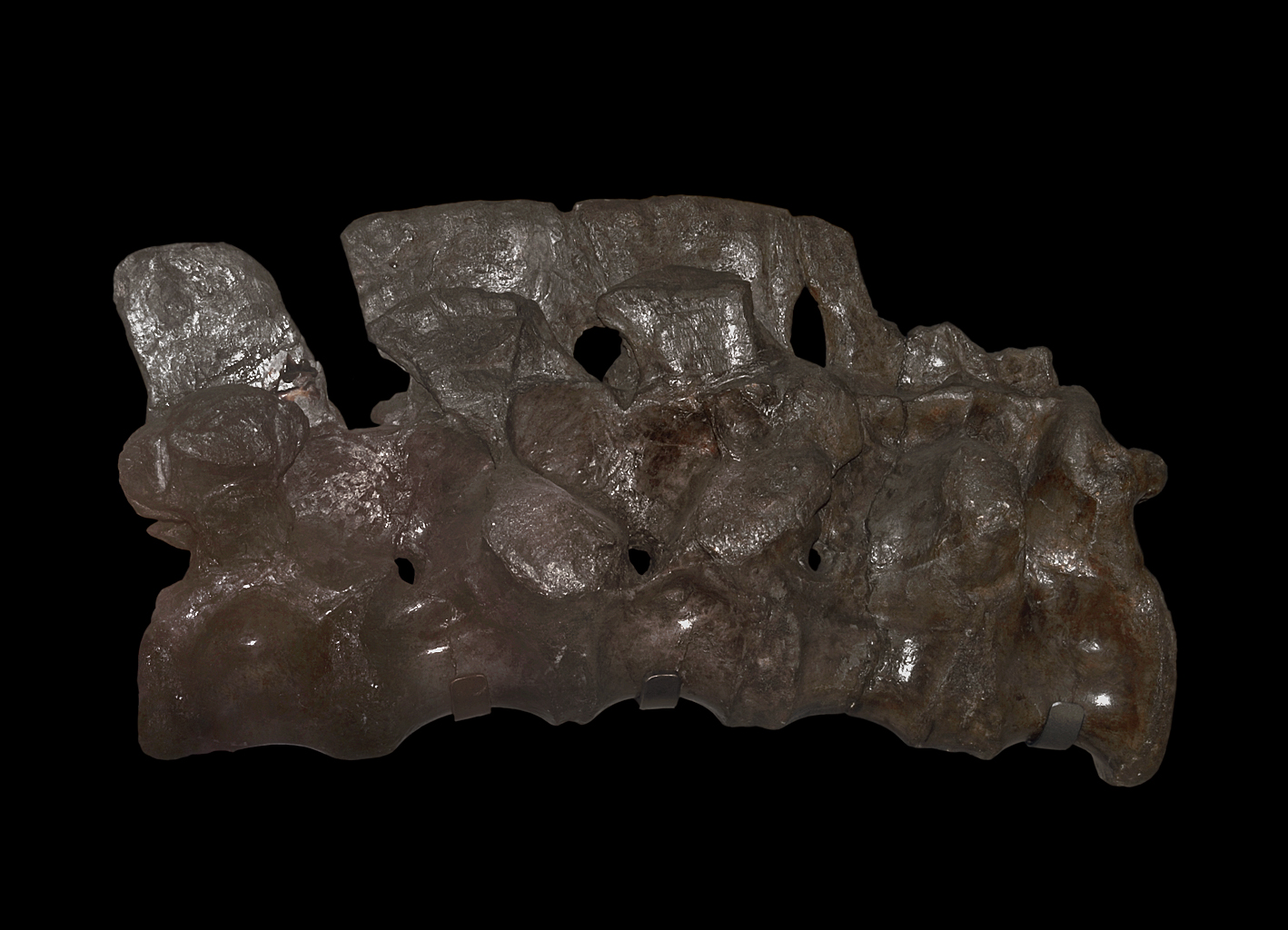
OUM J13576, an articulated sacrum

Although the exact numbers are unknown, the vertebral column of Megalosaurus was probably divided into 10 neck vertebrae, 13 dorsal vertebrae, five sacral vertebrae and 50 to 60 tail vertebrae, as is common for basal Tetanurae.

The Stonesfield Slate material contains no neck vertebrae; but a single broken anterior cervical vertebra is known from the New Park Quarry, specimen NHMUK PV R9674. The breakage reveals large internal air chambers. The vertebra is also otherwise heavily pneumatized, with large pleurocoels, pneumatic excavations, on its sides. The rear facet of the centrum is strongly concave. The neck ribs are short. The front dorsal vertebrae are slightly opisthocoelous, with convex front centrum facets and concave rear centrum facets. They are also deeply keeled, with the ridge on the underside representing about 50% of the total centrum height. The front dorsals perhaps have a pleurocoel above the diapophysis, the lower rib joint process. The rear dorsal vertebrae, according to Benson, are not pneumatized. They are slightly amphicoelous, with hollow centrum facets. They have secondary joint processes, forming a hyposphene–hypantrum complex, the hyposphene having a triangular transverse cross-section. The height of the dorsal spines of the rear dorsals is unknown, but a high spine on a tail vertebra of the New Park Quarry material, specimen NHMUK PV R9677, suggests the presence of a crest on the hip area. The spines of the five vertebrae of the sacrum form a supraneural plate, fused at the top. The undersides of the sacral vertebrae are rounded but the second sacral is keeled; normally it is the third or fourth sacral having a ridge. The sacral vertebrae seem not to be pneumatized but have excavations at their sides. The tail vertebrae are slightly amphicoelous, with hollow centrum facets on both the front and rear side. They have excavations at their sides and a longitudinal groove on the underside. The neural spines of the tail basis are transversely thin and tall, representing more than half of the total vertebral height.

=== Appendicular skeleton ===
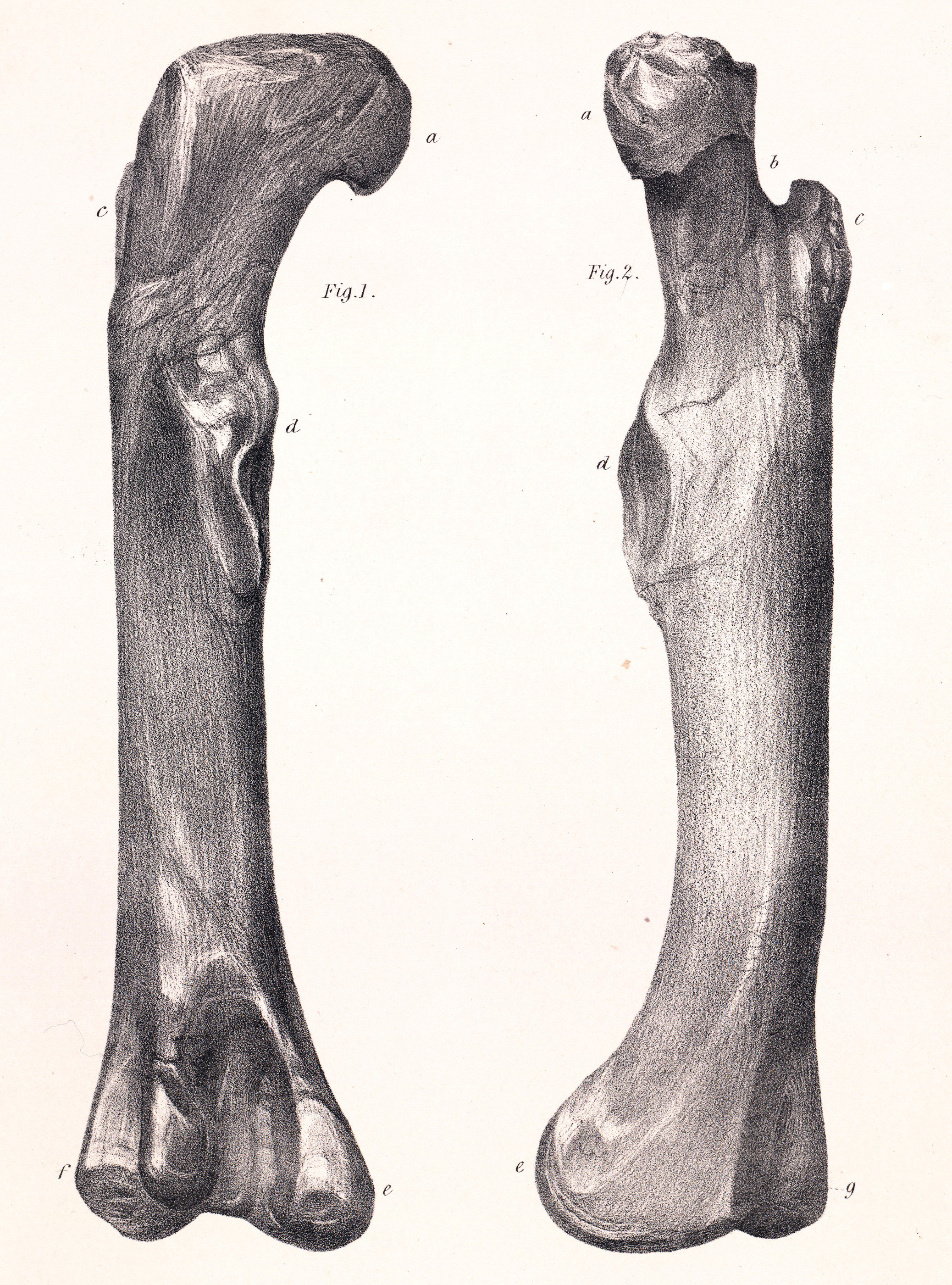
Lithograph of the femur, from a posterior (left) and medial view (right). Work by James Erxleben in the 1800s

The shoulderblade or scapula is short and wide, its length about 6.8 times the minimum width; this is a rare and basal trait within Tetanurae. Its top curves slightly to the rear in side view. On the lower outer side of the blade a broad ridge is present, running from just below the shoulder joint to about mid-length where it gradually merges with the blade surface. The middle front edge over about 30% of its length is thinned, forming a slightly protruding crest. The scapula constitutes about half of the shoulder joint, which is orientated obliquely sideways and to below. The coracoid is in all known specimens fused with the scapula into a scapulocoracoid, lacking a visible suture. The coracoid as such is an oval bone plate, with its longest side attached to the scapula. It is pierced by a large oval foramen but the usual boss for the attachment of the upper arm muscles is lacking.

The humerus is very robust with strongly expanded upper and lower ends. Humerus specimen OUMNH J.13575 has a length of 388 millimeters. Its shaft circumference equals about half of the total humerus length. The humerus head continues to the front and the rear into large bosses, together forming a massive bone plate. On the front outer side of the shaft a large triangular deltopectoral crest is present, the attachment for the Musculus pectoralis major and the Musculus deltoideus. It covers about the upper half of the shaft length, its apex positioned rather low. The ulna is extremely robust, for its absolute size more heavily built than with any other known member of the Tetanurae. The only known specimen, NHMUK PV OR 36585, has a length of 232 millimeters and a minimal shaft circumference of 142 millimeters. The ulna is straight in front view and has a large olecranon, the attachment process for the Musculus triceps brachii. Radius, wrist and hand are unknown.

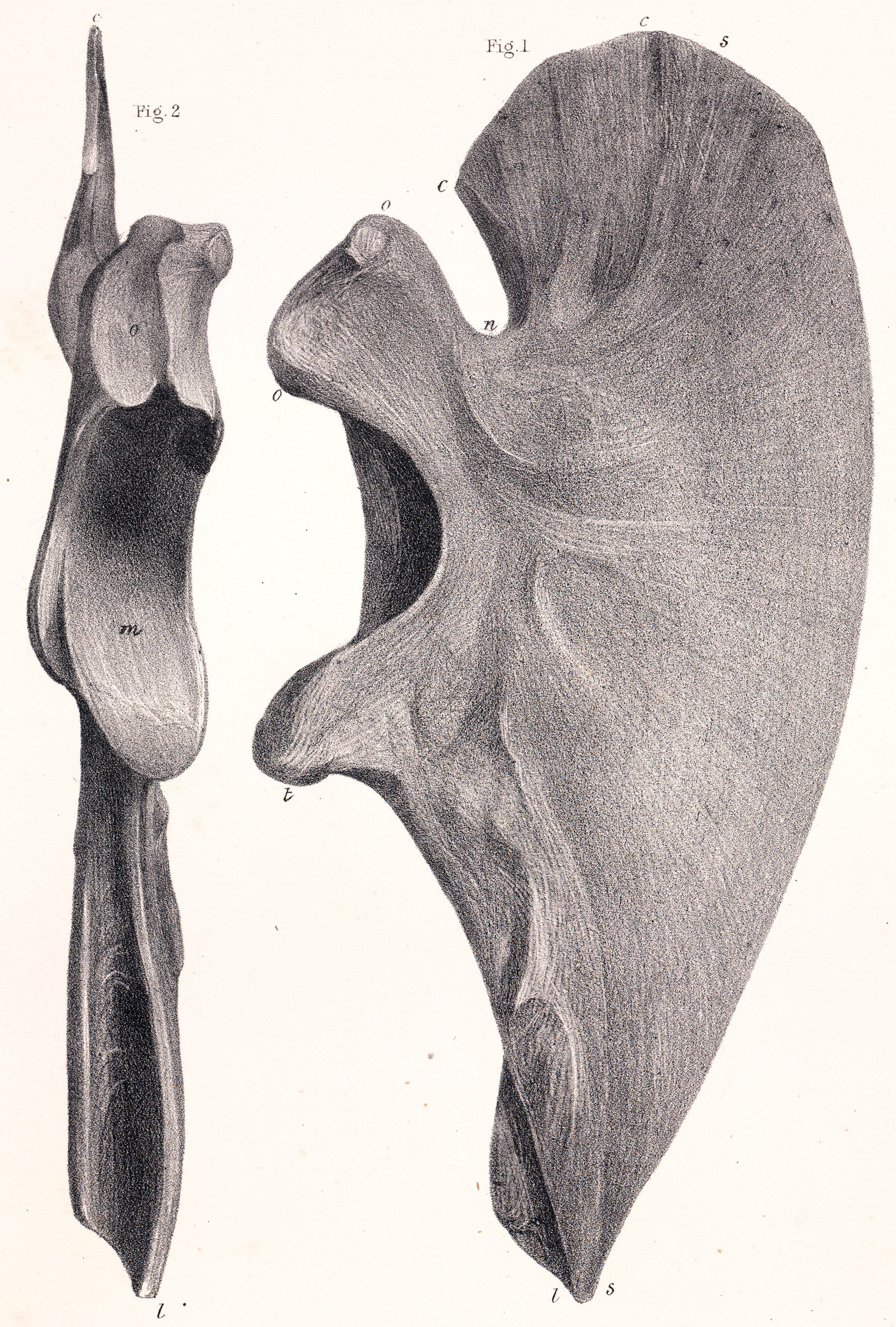
Lithograph of the Ilium. Work from the 1800s drawn by James Erxleben

In the pelvis, the ilium is long and low, with a convex upper profile. Its front blade is triangular and rather short; at the front end there is a small drooping point, separated by a notch from the pubic peduncle. The rear blade is roughly rectangular. The outer side of the ilium is concave, serving as an attachment surface for the Musculus iliofemoralis, the main thigh muscle. Above the hip joint, on this surface a low vertical ridge is present with conspicuous vertical grooves. The bottom of the rear blade is excavated by a narrow but deep trough forming a bony shelf for the attachment of the Musculus caudofemoralis brevis. The outer side of the rear blade does not match the inner side, which thus can be seen as a separate "medial blade" that in side view is visible in two places: in the corner between outer side and the ischial peduncle and as a small surface behind the extreme rear tip of the outer side of the rear blade. The pubic bone is straight. The pubic bones of both pelvis halves are connected via narrow bony skirts that originated at a rather high position on the rear side and continued downwards to a point low on the front side of the shaft. The ischium is S-shaped in side view, showing at the transition point between the two curvatures a rough boss on the outer side. On the front edge of the ischial shaft an obturator process is present in the form of a low ridge, at its top separated from the shaft by a notch. To below, this ridge continues into an exceptionally thick bony skirt at the inner rear side of the shaft, covering over half of its length. Towards the end of the shaft, this skirt gradually merges with it. The shaft eventually ends in a sizeable "foot" with a convex lower profile.

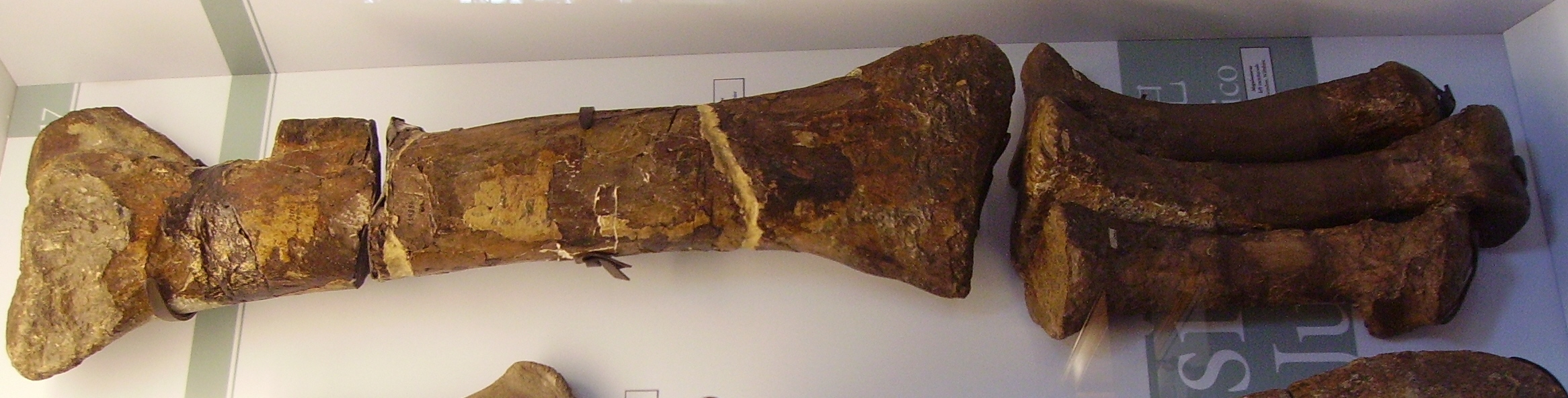
Tibia and metatarsals

The thigh bone is straight in front view. Seen from the same direction its head is perpendicular to the shaft, seen from above it is orientated 20° to the front. The greater trochanter is relatively wide and separated from the robust lesser trochanter in front of it, by a fissure. At the front base of the lesser trochanter a low accessory trochanter is present. At the lower end of the thigh bone a distinct front, extensor, groove separates the condyles. At the upper inner side of this groove a rough area is present continuing inwards into a longitudinal ridge, a typical megalosauroid trait. The shinbone, or tibia, is relatively straight, slightly curving inwards. To below, its shaft progressively flattens from front to rear, resulting in a generally oval cross-section. For about an eighth of its length the front lower end of the shaft is covered by a vertical branch of the astragalus. Of the foot, only the second, third and fourth metatarsals are known, the bone elements that were connected to the three weight-bearing toes. They are straight and robust, showing ligament pits at their lower sides. The third metatarsal has no clear condyles at its lower end, resulting in a more flexible joint, allowing for a modicum of horizontal movement. The top inner side of the third metatarsal carries a unique ridge that fits into a groove along the top outer side of the second metatarsal, causing a tighter connection.

=== Diagnosis ===
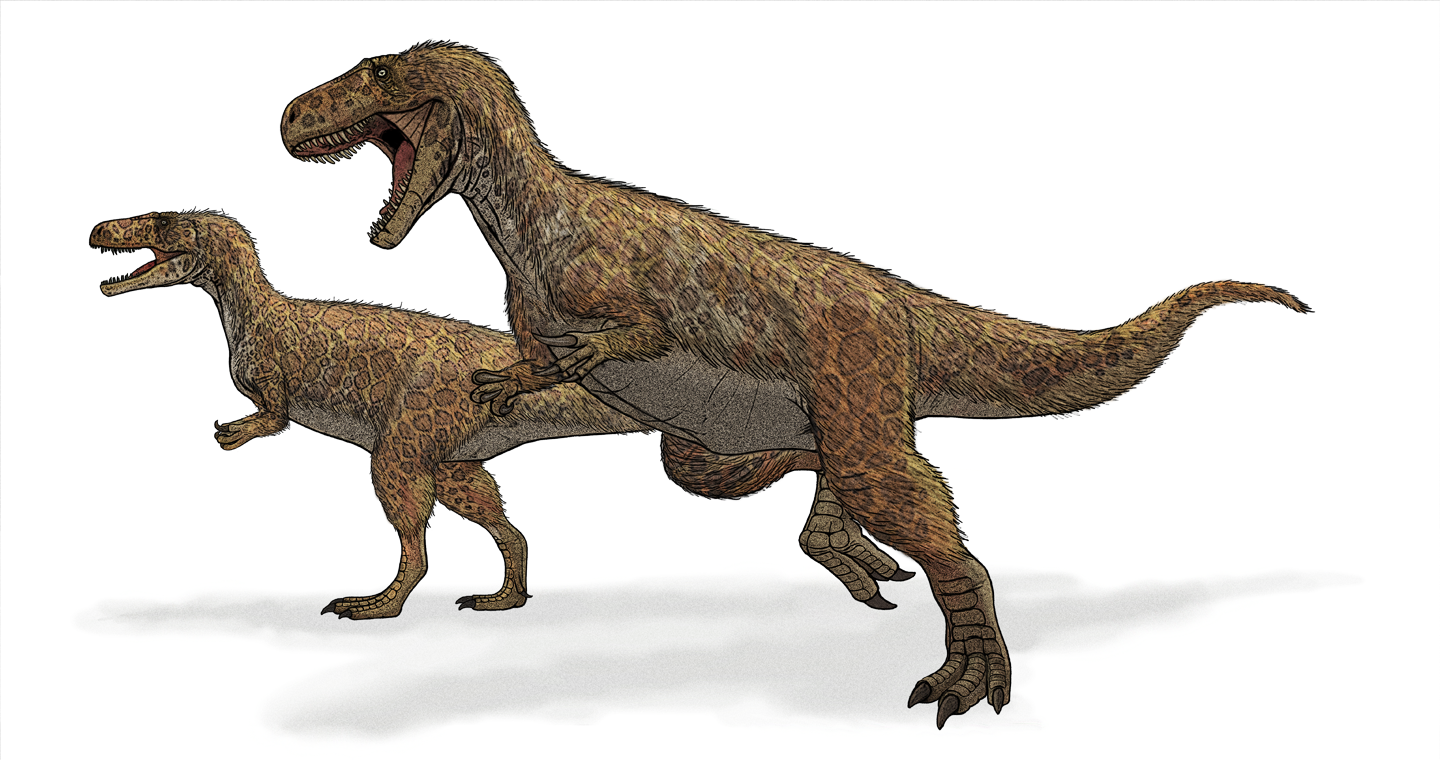
Restoration of Megalosaurus, with a mostly hypothetical head

For decades after its discovery, Megalosaurus was seen by researchers as the definitive or typical large carnivorous dinosaur. As a result, it began to function as a "wastebasket taxon", and many large or small carnivorous dinosaurs from Europe and elsewhere were assigned to the genus. This slowly changed during the 20th century, when it became common to restrict the genus to fossils found in the middle Jurassic of England. Further restriction occurred in the late 20th and early 21st centuries, researchers such as Ronan Allain and Dan Chure suggesting that the Stonesfield Slate fossils perhaps belonged to several, possibly not directly related, species of theropod dinosaur. Subsequent research seemed to confirm this hypothesis, and the genus Megalosaurus and species M. bucklandii became generally regarded as limited to the taxon having produced the lectotype, the dentary of the lower jaw. Furthermore, several researchers failed to find any characteristics in that jaw that could be used to distinguish Megalosaurus from its relatives, which would mean the genus were a nomen dubium. However, a comprehensive study by Roger Benson and colleagues in 2008, and several related analyses published in subsequent years, overturned the previous consensus by identifying several autapomorphies, or unique distinguishing characteristics, in the lower jaw that could be used to separate Megalosaurus from other megalosaurids.

Various distinguishing traits of the lower jaw have been established. The longitudinal groove on the outer surface of the dentary is wide. The third tooth socket of the dentary is not enlarged. Seen from above, the dentary is straight without an expanded jaw tip. The interdental plates, reinforcing the teeth from behind, of the lower jaw are tall. Benson also concluded it would be most parsimonious to assume that the Stonesfield Slate material represents a single species. If so, several additional distinctive traits can be observed in other parts of the skeleton. The low vertical ridge on the outer side of the ilium, above the hip joint, shows parallel vertical grooves. The bony skirts between the shafts of the ischia are thick and touch each other forming an almost flat surface. There is a boss present on the lower outer side of the ischium shaft with a rough surface. The underside of the second sacral vertebra has an angular longitudinal keel. A ridge on the upper side of the third metatarsal connected to a groove in the side of the second metatarsal. The middle of the front edge of the scapula forms a thin crest.

== Phylogeny ==
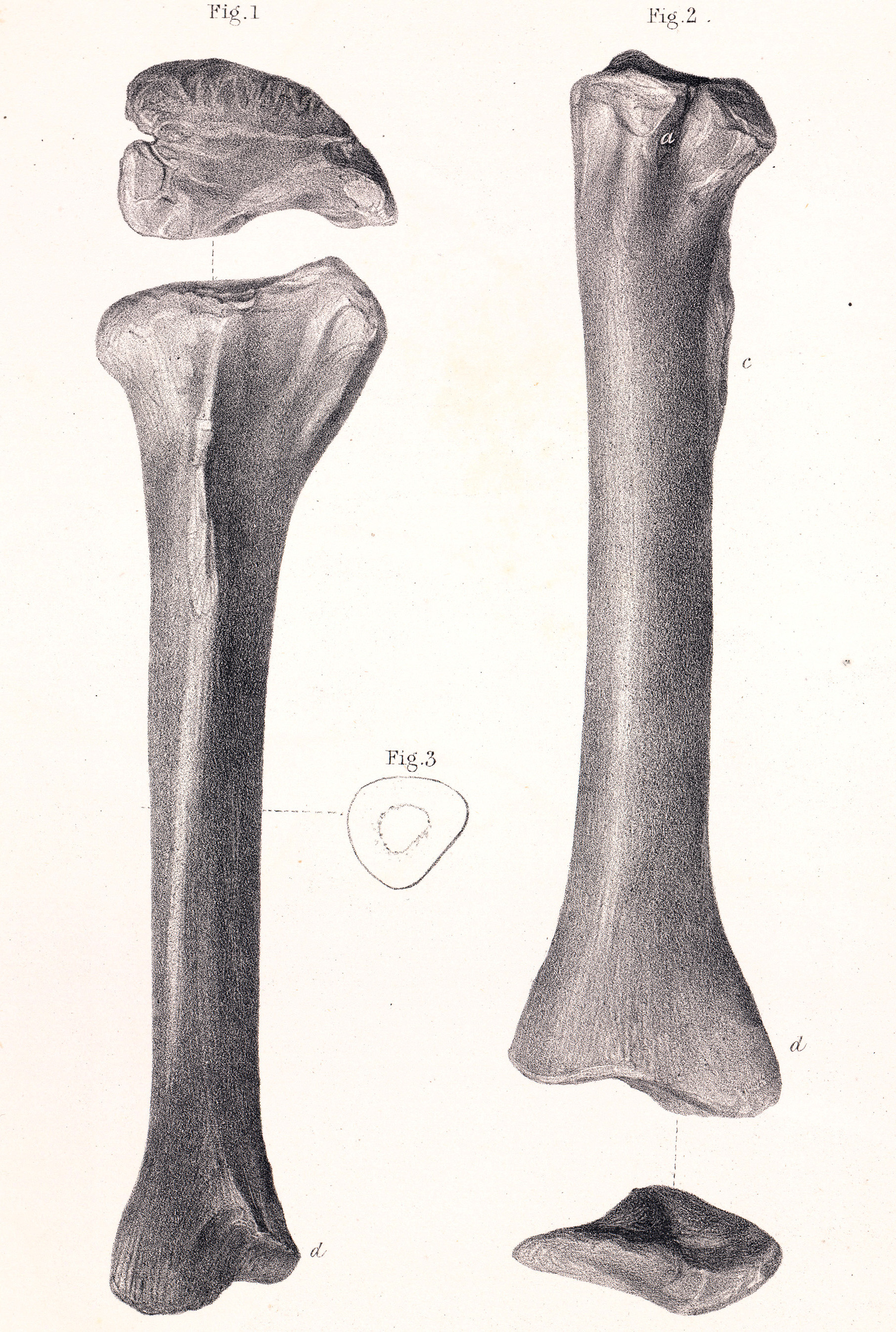
Referred tibia, lateral view (left), posterior view (right). Lithograph drawn by James Erxleben in the 19th century

In 1824, Buckland assigned Megalosaurus to the Sauria, assuming within the Sauria a close affinity with modern lizards, more than with crocodiles. In 1842, Owen made Megalosaurus one of the first three genera placed in the Dinosauria. In 1850, Prince Charles Lucien Bonaparte coined a separate family Megalosauridae with Megalosaurus as the type genus. For a long time, the precise relationships of Megalosaurus remained vague. It was seen as a "primitive" member of the Carnosauria, the group in which most large theropods were united.

In the late 20th century the new method of cladistics allowed for the first time to exactly calculate how closely various taxa were related to each other. In 2012, Matthew Carrano et al. showed that Megalosaurus was the sister species of Torvosaurus within the Megalosaurinae, giving this cladogram:

- Megalosauroidea
  - Piatnitzkysauridae
  - Megalosauria
    - Streptospondylus
    - Spinosauridae
    - Megalosauridae
      - Eustreptospondylinae
        - Eustreptospondylus
      - - Megalosaurinae
          - Duriavenator
          - - Megalosaurus
            - Torvosaurus
        - Afrovenatorinae
          - Afrovenator
          - - Dubreuillosaurus
            - Magnosaurus
          - - Leshansaurus
            - Piveteausaurus

== Paleobiology ==
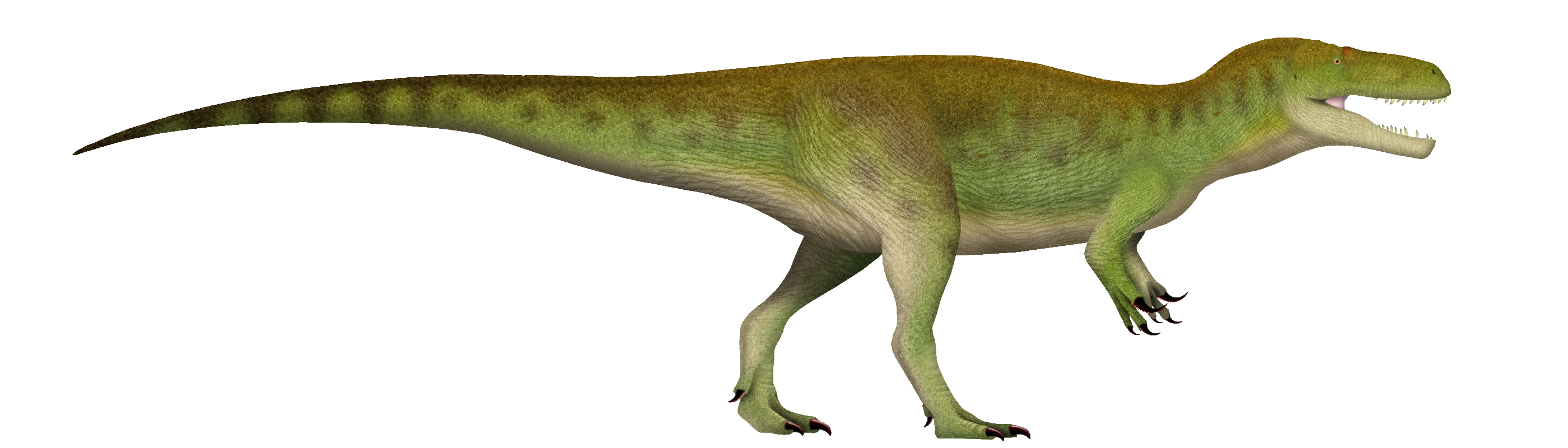
Restoration in side-on view

Megalosaurus lived in what is now Europe during the Bathonian stage of the Middle Jurassic (~166-168 million years ago). Repeated descriptions during the nineteenth and early twentieth century of Megalosaurus hunting Iguanodon (another of the earliest dinosaurs named) through the forests that then covered the continent are now known to be inaccurate, because Iguanodon skeletons are found in much younger Early Cretaceous formations. The only specimens belonging to Megalosaurus bucklandii are from the Lower/Middle Bathonian of Oxfordshire and Gloucestershire. No material from outside the Bathonian formations of England can be referred to Megalosaurus. Other roughly contemporaneous dinosaur species known from the Bathonian of Britain include the theropods Cruxicheiros (a large sized taxon), Iliosuchus (a dubious taxon only known from fragmentary remains), the small tyrannosauroid Proceratosaurus, and other indeterminate theropods known from teeth, suggested to include dromaeosaurs, troodontids, and therizinosaurs, indeterminate ornithischians primarily known from teeth, including heterodontosaurids, stegosaurs, and ankylosaurs, and the sauropods Cardiodon (only known from teeth) and Cetiosaurus. Megalosaurus may have hunted stegosaurs and sauropods.

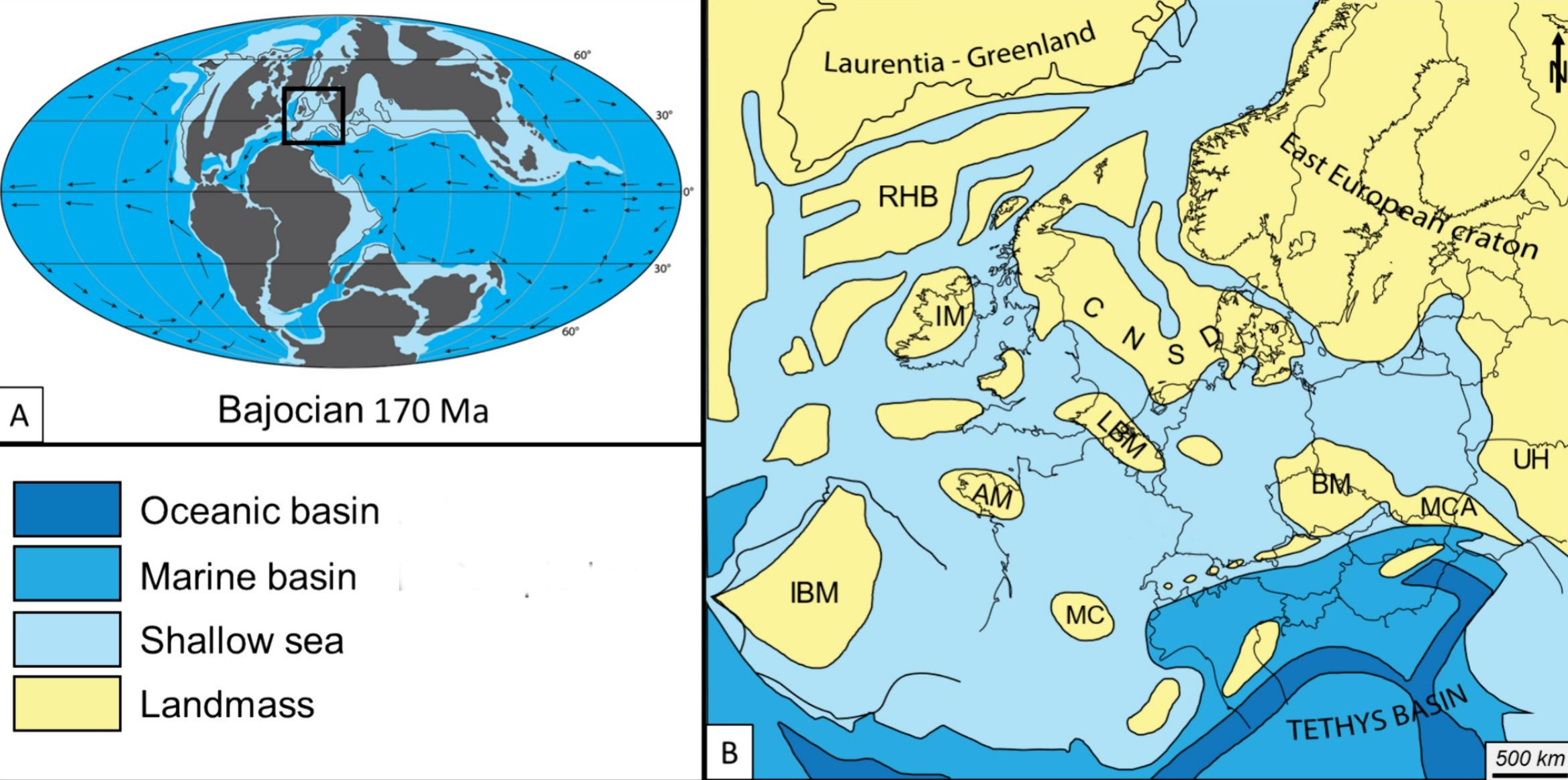
Map of Europe during the preceding Bajocian period, which had a broadly similar paleogeography to the Bathonian when Megalosaurus lived. The London-Brabant Massif is labelled "LBM", while the Armorican Massif is labelled "AM"

Benson in 2010 concluded from its size and common distribution that Megalosaurus was the apex predator of its habitat. He saw the absence of Cetiosaurus on the French Armorican Massif as an indication that Megalosaurus too did not live on that island and was limited to the London-Brabant Massif, a tectonic high that during this period formed an island landmass including parts of southern Britain and adjacent areas of northern France, the Netherlands, Belgium and western Germany, suggested to be comparable in size to Cuba with an area of around 100,000 square kilometres (39,000 sq mi). It has been questioned why the dinosaurs of the island did not experience insular dwarfism, as would be expected for an island of this size. A possible explanation for this is that the island remained ecologically connected to the much larger landmass comprising northern Britain (the Scottish Massif), the Fennoscandian Shield and the now submerged region in the North Sea between them, with the seaway across England being very shallow, and showing evidence of at times being temporarily transformed into lagoons and terrestrial environments during the Bathonian. Plant fossils from the Taynton Limestone Formation from which many Megalosaurus fossils originate, representing the nearshore vegetation are largely dominated by conifers (including the living family Araucariaceae and the extinct family Cheirolepidiaceae) as well as the extinct seed plant group Bennettitales, with other plants including cycads (Ctenis), ferns (Phlebopteris, Coniopteris) Caytoniales, the living genus Ginkgo, and the seed ferns Pachypteris and Komlopteris, representing a probably seasonally dry coastal environment including mangroves.

=== Paleopathology ===
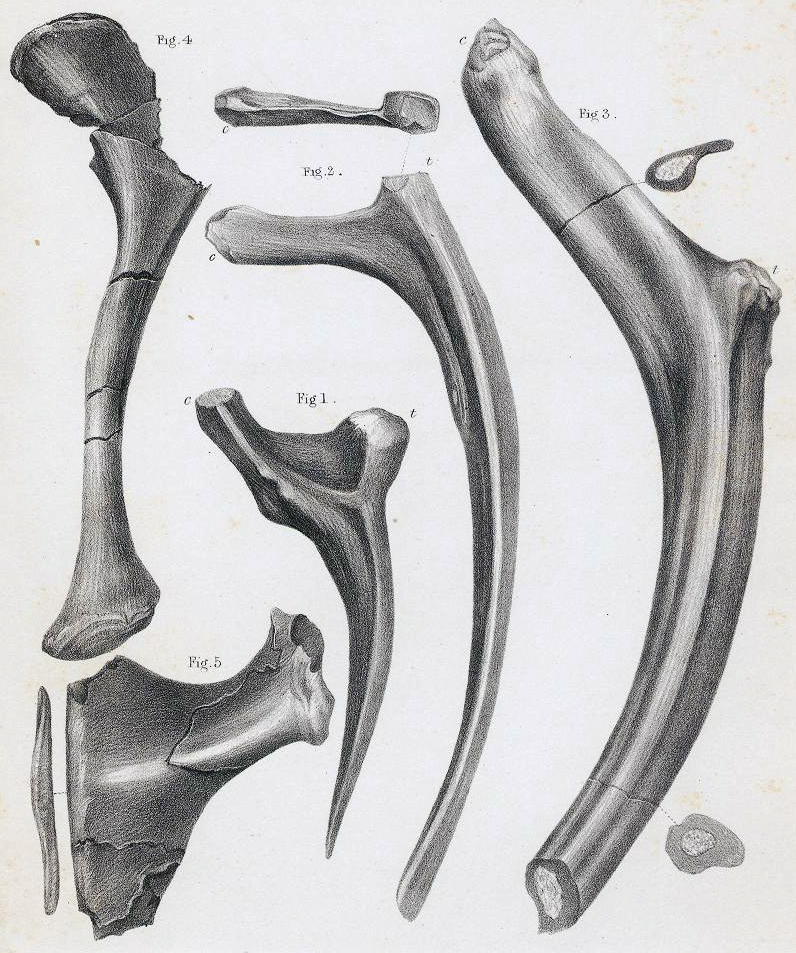
Ribs and pelvic elements. The left rib fragment shows a healed fracture at the underside of the base of the capitulum. Work from the 1800s drawn by James Erxleben

A Megalosaurus rib figured in 1856 and 1884 by Sir Richard Owen has a pathological swollen spot near the base of its capitular process. The swollen spot appears to have been caused by a healed fracture and is located at the point where it would have articulated with its vertebra.

== Species and synonyms ==
During the later nineteenth century, Megalosaurus was seen as the typical carnivorous dinosaur. If remains were found that were not deemed sufficiently distinct to warrant a separate genus, often single teeth, these were classified under Megalosaurus, which thus began to function as a wastebasket taxon, a sort of default genus. Eventually, Megalosaurus contained more species than any other non-avian dinosaur genus, most of them of dubious validity. During the twentieth century, this practice was gradually discontinued; but scientists discovering theropods that had been mistakenly classified under a different animal group in older literature, still felt themselves forced to rename them, again choosing Megalosaurus as the default generic name.

=== Species named in the 19th century ===
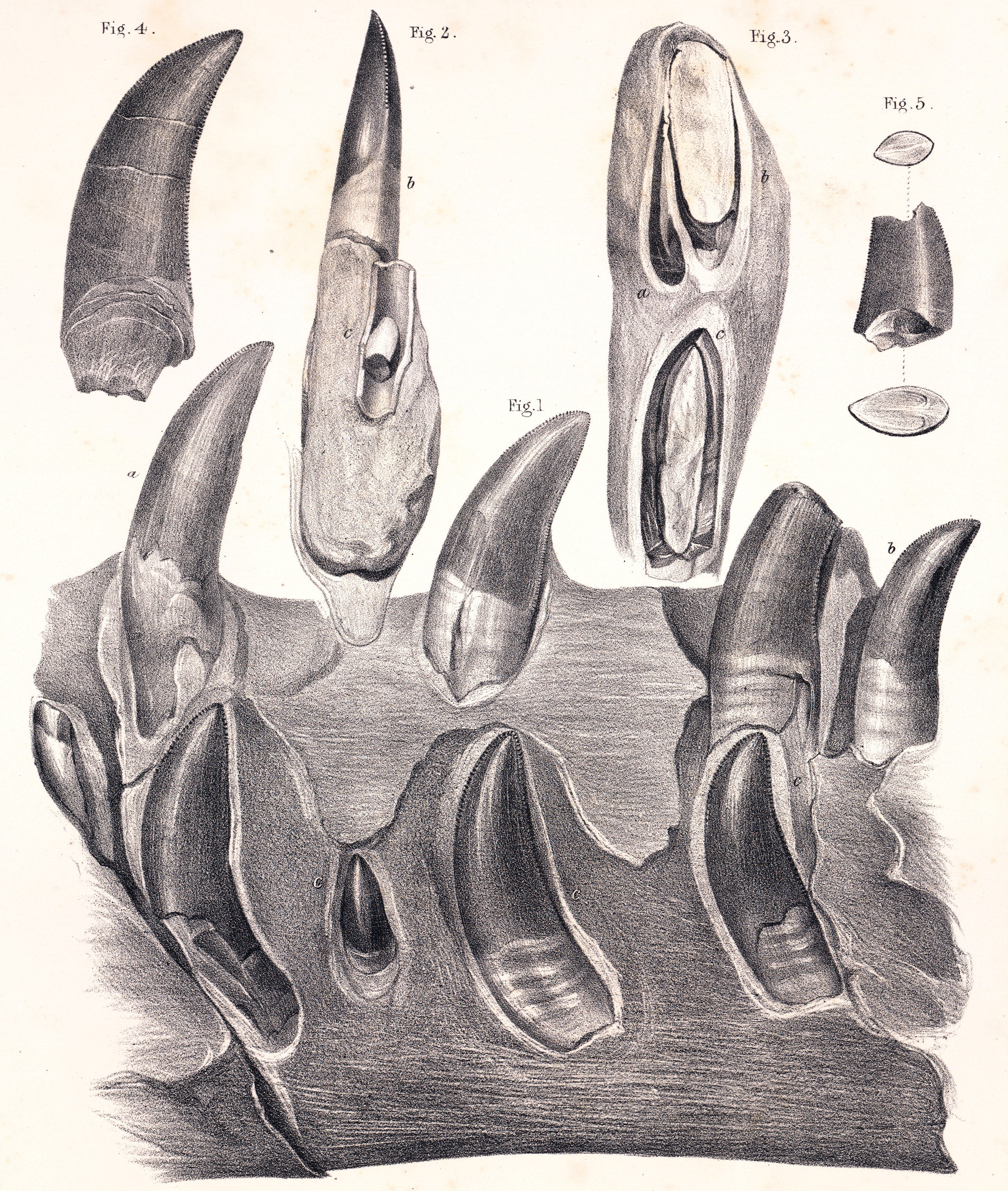
Dentary with replacement teeth, found in 1851 and in 1857 by Owen referred to Megalosaurus, but now lost. 1800s illustration by James Erxleben

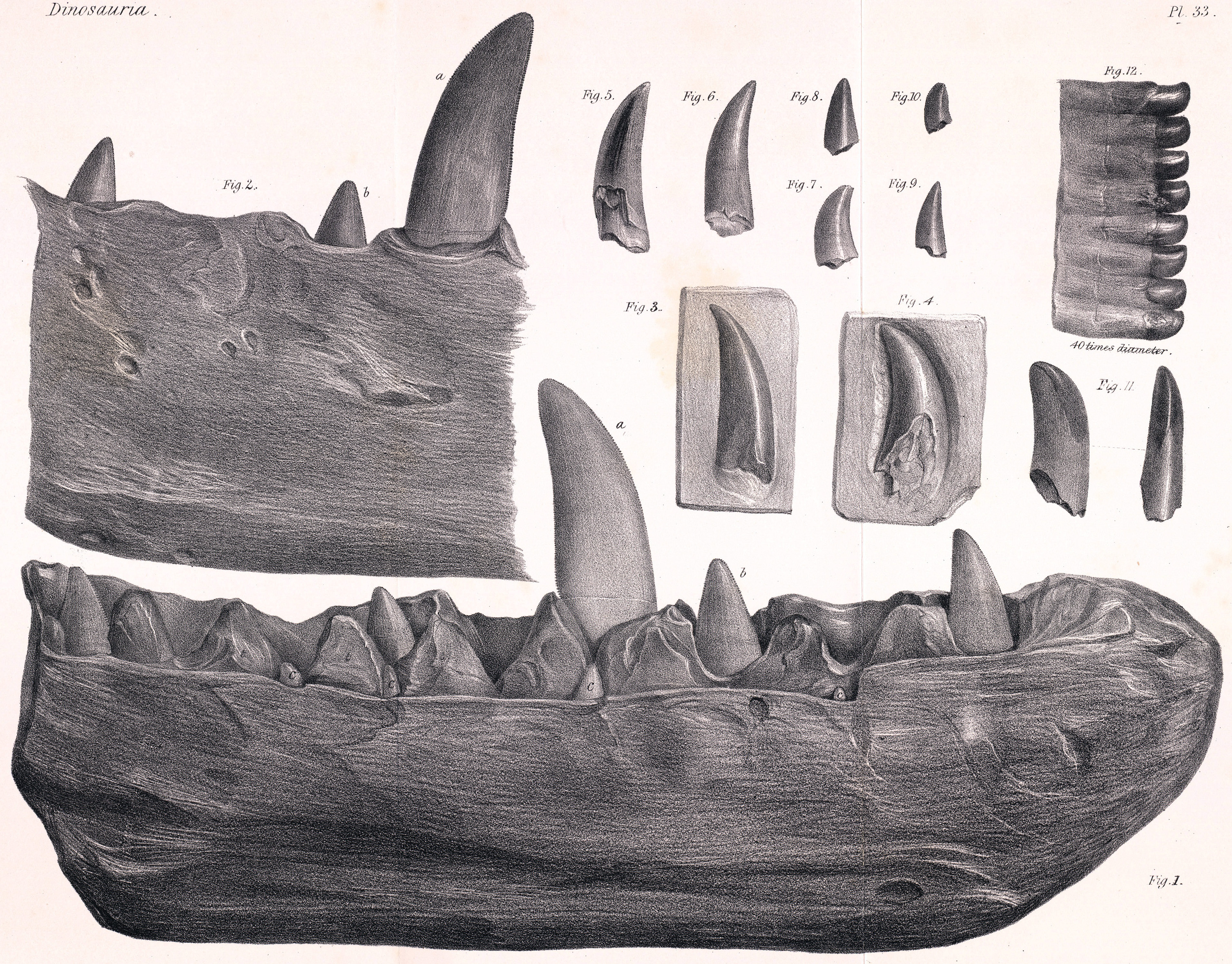
Type dentary and referred teeth. 1800s restoration by James Erxleben

In 1857, Joseph Leidy renamed Deinodon horridus (Leidy, 1856) into Megalosaurus horridus, the "frightening one", a genus based on teeth. In 1858, Friedrich August Quenstedt named Megalosaurus cloacinus, based on a probable Late Triassic theropod tooth found near Bebenhausen, specimen SMNH 52457. It is a nomen dubium. In 1869 Eugène Eudes-Deslongchamps named Megalosaurus insignis, the "significant", based on a theropod tooth found near La Hève in Normandy that was 12 centimeters long, a third longer than the teeth of M. bucklandii. The name at first remained a nomen nudum, but a description was provided, in 1870, by Gustave Lennier. Today, it is considered a nomen dubium, an indeterminate member of the Theropoda, the specimen having in 1944 been destroyed by a bombardment. In 1870, Jean-Baptiste Greppin named Megalosaurus meriani based on specimen MH 350, a premaxillary tooth found near Moutier and part of the collection of Peter Merian. Today, this is either referred to Amanzia, Ceratosaurus or seen as a nomen dubium, an indeterminate member of the Ceratosauria. In 1871, Emanuel Bunzel named remains found near Schnaitheim Megalosaurus schnaitheimi. It is a nomen nudum, the fossils possibly belonging to Dakosaurus maximus. In 1876, J. Henry, a science teacher at Besançon, in a published dissertation named four Late Triassic possible dinosaur teeth found near Moissey Megalosaurus obtusus, "the blunt one". It is a nomen dubium, perhaps a theropod or some indeterminate predatory archosaur. In 1881, Harry Govier Seeley named two possible theropod teeth found in Austria Megalosaurus pannoniensis. The specific name refers to Pannonia. It is a nomen dubium, possibly an indeterminate member of the Dromaeosauridae or Tyrannosauroidea. In 1883, Seeley named Megalosaurus bredai, based on a thigh bone, specimen NHMUK PV OR 42997 found near Maastricht, the Netherlands. The specific name honours Jacob Gijsbertus Samuël van Breda. In 1932, this was made a separate genus Betasuchus by Friedrich von Huene.

In 1882, Henri-Émile Sauvage named remains found at Louppy-le-Château, teeth and vertebrae from the Early Cretaceous, Megalosaurus superbus, "the proud one". In 1923, this became the genus Erectopus. In 1884/1885, Wilhelm Barnim Dames, based on specimen UM 84, a tooth from the Early Cretaceous, named Megalosaurus dunkeri, the specific name honouring Wilhelm Dunker. In 1923, this was made a separate genus Altispinax. In 1885, Joseph Henri Ferdinand Douvillé renamed Dakosaurus gracilis Quenstedt 1885 into Megalosaurus gracilis. Today the renaming is generally rejected. In 1889, Richard Lydekker named Megalosaurus oweni, the specific name honouring Owen, based on a series of metatarsals from the Early Cretaceous, specimen BMNH R?2556?. In 1991, this was made a separate genus Valdoraptor. In 1892, Edward Drinker Cope renamed Ceratosaurus nasicornis Marsh 1884 into Megalosaurus nasicornis. This had been largely motivated by a desire to annoy his rival Othniel Charles Marsh and the name has found no acceptance. In 1896, Charles Jean Julien Depéret named Megalosaurus crenatissimus, "the much crenelated", based on remains from the Late Cretaceous found in Madagascar. In 1955 this was made a separate genus Majungasaurus. The generic name Laelaps, used by Cope to denote a theropod, had been preoccupied by a mite. Marsh had therefore provided the replacement name Dryptosaurus, but Henry Fairfield Osborn, a partisan of Cope, rejected this replacement and thus in 1898 renamed Laelaps aquilunguis Cope 1866 into Megalosaurus aquilunguis.

=== Species named in the 20th century ===
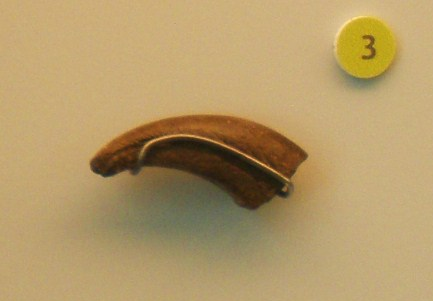
Claw of Megalosaurus lonzeensis

In 1901 Baron Franz Nopcsa renamed Laelaps trihedrodon Cope 1877 into Megalosaurus trihedrodon. In the same publication Nopcsa renamed Poekilopleuron valens Leidy 1870 into Megalosaurus valens; this probably represents fossil material of Allosaurus. In 1902, Nopcsa named Megalosaurus hungaricus based on two teeth found in Transylvania, then part of the Kingdom of Hungary. The specimens, MAFI ob. 3106, were later lost. It represents an indeterminate theropod. In 1903, Louis Dollo named Megalosaurus lonzeensis based on a manual claw found near Lonzee in Belgium. He had first reported this claw in 1883, and as a result some sources by mistake indicate this year as the date of the naming. It perhaps represents a member of the Noasauridae, or an indeterminate member of the Coelurosauria. In 1907 or 1908, von Huene renamed Streptospondylus cuvieri, based on a presently lost partial vertebra, into Megalosaurus cuvieri. This is today seen as a nomen dubium, an indeterminate member of the Tetanurae. In 1909, Richard Lydekker named Megalosaurus woodwardi, based on a maxilla with tooth, specimen NHMUK PV OR 41352. This is today seen as a nomen dubium, an indeterminate member of the Theropoda.

In 1910, Arthur Smith Woodward named Megalosaurus bradleyi based on a skull from the Middle Jurassic, the specific name honouring the collector F. Lewis Bradley. In 1926, this was made a separate genus Proceratosaurus. In 1920, Werner Janensch named Megalosaurus ingens, "the enormous", based on specimen MB R 1050, a 12 centimeter long tooth from German East Africa. It possibly represents a large member of the Carcharodontosauridae; Carrano e.a. saw it as an indeterminate member of the Tetanurae. M. ingens is now seen as a specimen of Torvosaurus. In 1923, von Huene renamed Poekilopleuron bucklandii Eudes-Deslongchamps 1838 into Megalosaurus poikilopleuron. Today, the genus Poekilopleuron is generally seen as valid. In the same publication, von Huene named two additional Megalosaurus species. The first was Megalosaurus parkeri, its specific name honouring William Kitchen Parker and based on a pelvis, leg bones and vertebrae from the Late Cretaceous. This was made the separate genus Metriacanthosaurus in 1964. The second was Megalosaurus nethercombensis, named after its provenance from Nethercombe and based on two dentaries, leg bones, a pelvis and vertebrae from the Middle Jurassic, which von Huene himself in 1932 made the separate genus Magnosaurus. In 1925, Depéret, based on two teeth from Algeria, named Megalosaurus saharicus. In 1931/1932 this was made the separate genus Carcharodontosaurus. In 1956 von Huene by mistake named the same species as Megalosaurus africanus, intending to base it on remains from Morocco but referring the Algerian teeth; this implies that M. africanus is a junior objective synonym of M. saharicus. In 1926, von Huene named Megalosaurus lydekkeri, its specific name honouring Richard Lydekker, based on NHMUK OR 41352, i.e. the same specimen that had already been made the holotype of M. woodwardi (Lydekker, 1909). This implies that M. lydekkeri is a junior objective synonym of M. woodwardi. It is likewise seen as a nomen dubium.

In the same publication von Huene named Megalosaurus terquemi based on three teeth found near Hettingen, its specific name honouring Olry Terquem. It is seen as a nomen dubium, the fossil material probably representing some member of the Phytosauria or some other archosaur. In 1932, a work by von Huene mentioned a Megalosaurus (Magnosaurus) woodwardi, a synonym of Magnosaurus woodwardi named in the same book. Its type specimen is differing from the earlier Megalosaurus woodwardi (Lydekker, 1909), the two names are not synonyms. In 1954 Samuel Welles named Megalosaurus wetherilli. This species is exceptional in being based on a rather complete skeleton, found in Arizona, from the Early Jurassic. Its specific name honours John Wetherill. In 1970, Welles made this the separate genus Dilophosaurus. In 1955, Albert-Félix de Lapparent named Megalosaurus mersensis based on a series of 23 vertebrae found near Tizi n'Juillerh in a layer of the El Mers Formation of Morocco. This probably represents a member of the Mesosuchia. In 1956, Alfred Sherwood Romer renamed Aggiosaurus nicaeensis Ambayrac 1913, based on a lower jaw found near Nice, on the authority of von Huene into Megalosaurus nicaeensis. Originally it had been considered to be some crocodilian; present opinion confirms this. In 1957, de Lapparent named Megalosaurus pombali based on three teeth found near Pombal in the Jurassic of Portugal. Today it is seen as a nomen dubium, an indeterminate member of the Theropoda.

In 1965, Oskar Kuhn renamed Zanclodon silesiacus Jaekel 1910 into Megalosaurus? silesiacus. It is a nomen dubium based on the tooth of some indeterminate predatory Triassic archosaur, found in Silesia, perhaps a theropod. In 1966, Guillermo del Corro named Megalosaurus inexpectatus, named "the unexpected" as it was discovered on a sauropod site with remains of Chubutisaurus, based on specimen MACN 18.172, a tooth found in Argentina. It might represent a member of the Carcharodontosauridae. In 1970, Rodney Steel named two Megalosaurus species. Firstly, he renamed Iliosuchus incognitus Huene 1932 into Megalosaurus incognitus. Secondly, he renamed Nuthetes destructor Owen 1854 into Megalosaurus destructor. Both genera are today seen as not identical to Megalosaurus. Michael Waldman in 1974 renamed Sarcosaurus andrewsi Huene 1932 into Megalosaurus andrewsi. Indeed, Sarcosaurus andrewsi is today by some scientists not seen as directly related to the type species of Sarcosaurus: Sarcosaurus woodi. In the same publication Waldman named Megalosaurus hesperis, "the western one", based on skull fragments from the Middle Jurassic. In 2008 this was made the separate genus Duriavenator. Del Corro in 1974 named Megalosaurus chubutensis, based on specimen MACN 18.189, a tooth found in Chubut Province. It is a nomen dubium, a possible carcharodontosaurid, or a very large abelisaurid.

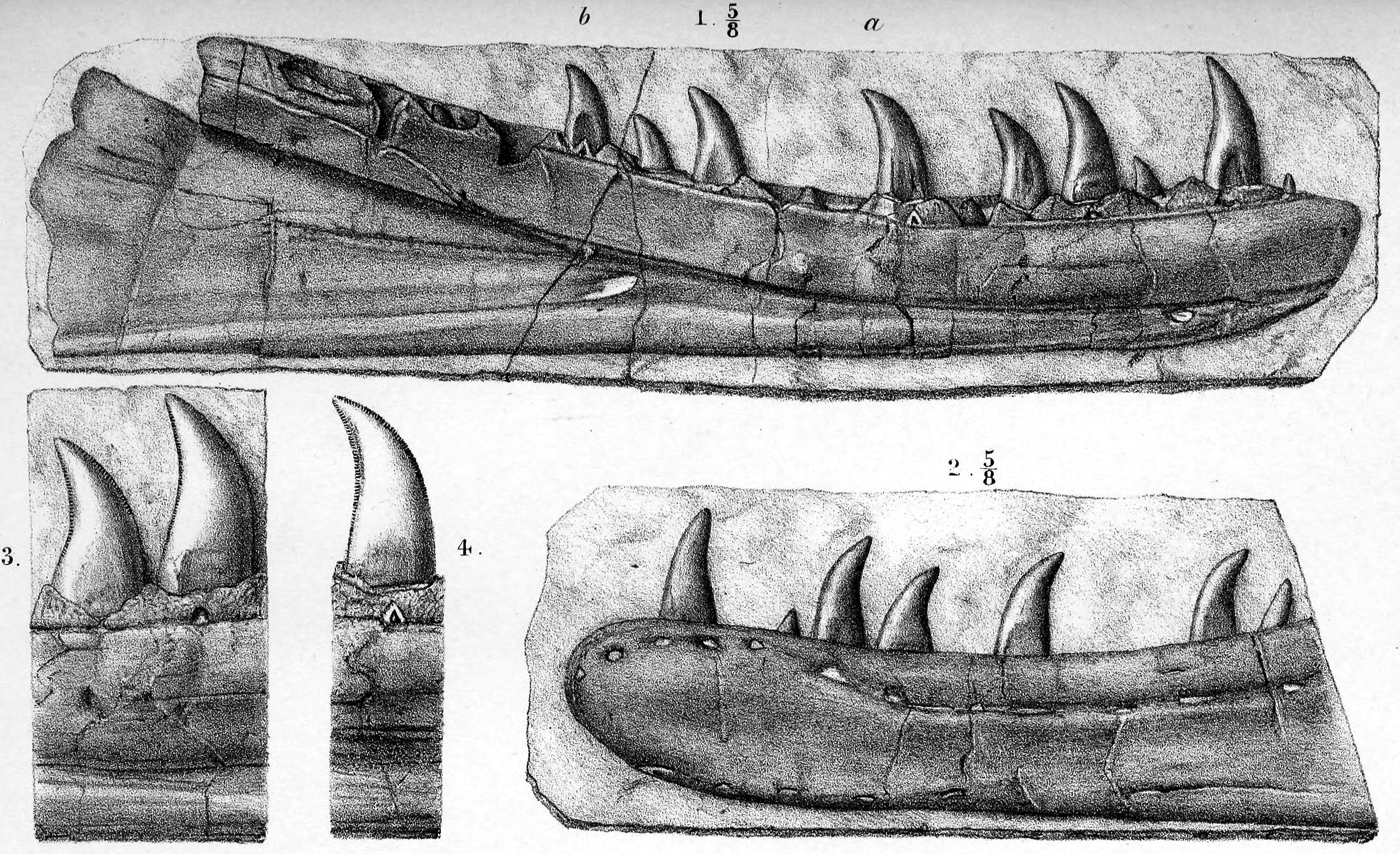
Dentary of ?Megalosaurus cambrensis, now recognised as Newtonsaurus cambrensis Lithograph by Newton in 1899

In 1985, Zhao Xijin named two Megalosaurus species found in Tibet. He had earlier mentioned these species in an unpublished dissertation of 1983, implying they initially were invalid nomina ex dissertatione. However, his 1985 publication did not contain descriptions so the names are still nomina nuda. The first species was Megalosaurus "dapukaensis", named for the Dapuka Group. It was, in the second edition of The Dinosauria, by mistake spelled as Megalosaurus cachuensis. The second species was Megalosaurus "tibetensis". In 1987/1988, Monique Vianey-Liaud renamed Massospondylus rawesi (Lydekker, 1890), based on specimen NHMUK R4190, a tooth from the Maastrichtian of India, into Megalosaurus rawesi. This is a nomen dubium, a possible member of the Abelisauridae. In 1988, Gregory S. Paul renamed Torvosaurus tanneri Galton & Jensen 1979 into Megalosaurus tanneri. The change has found no acceptance. In 1973, Anatoly Konstantinovich Rozhdestvensky had renamed Poekilopleuron schmidti Kiprijanow 1883 into a Megalosaurus sp. However, as it is formally impossible to change a named species into an unnamed one, George Olshevsky in 1991 used the new combination Megalosaurus schmidti. It is a chimaera. In 1993, Ernst Probst and Raymund Windolf by mistake renamed Plateosaurus ornatus Huene 1905 into Megalosaurus ornatus by mentioning the latter name in a species list. This can be seen as a nomen vanum. The same publication listed the ichnospecies Megalosauropus teutonicus Kaever & Lapparent 1974 as a Megalosaurus teutonicus. In 1997, Windolf renamed Saurocephalus monasterii Münster 1846, based on a tooth found near Hannover, into Megalosaurus monasterii. It is a nomen dubium, an indeterminate member of the Theropoda. In 1990, Ralph Molnar renamed "Zanclodon" cambrensis Newton 1899, based on a left lower jaw, specimen BGS 6532 found at Bridgend, Wales, United Kingdom, into ?Megalosaurus cambrensis, which was later followed by Peter Galton in 1998. It is a senior synonym of Gressylosaurus cambrensis Olshevsky 1991. The specific name refers to Cambria, the Latin name of Wales. It was suggested to probably represents a member of the Coelophysoidea, or some other predatory archosaur. In 2025, it was formally described as Newtonsaurus cambrensis, in a study that demonstrated unambiguously that it was a relatively primitive theropod dinosaur, a possibly coelophysoid member of Neotheropoda outside of Averostra.

=== Species list ===
The complex naming history can be summarized in a formal species list. The naming authors are directly mentioned behind the name. If the name has been changed, they are placed in parentheses and the authors of the changed name are mentioned behind them. The list also indicates whether a name has been insufficiently described (nomen nudum), is not taxonomically identifiable at the generic level (nomen dubium), or fallen out of use (nomen oblitum). Reclassifications under a different genus are mentioned behind the "=" sign; if the reclassification is today considered valid, it is listed under Reassigned species.

Valid species
- Megalosaurus Parkinson, 1822 (nomen nudum?)
- Megalosaurus conybeari Ritgen, 1826 (nomen oblitum) = Megalosaurus bucklandii, Mantell, 1827
- Megalosaurus bucklandii Gideon Mantell 1827 = Megalosaurus conybeari, Ritgen, 1826 (nomen oblitum), Megalosaurus bucklandi Meyer, 1832, Scrotum humanum Brookes, 1763 (nomen oblitum)
- Megalosaurus bucklandi Meyer, 1832 = Megalosaurus bucklandii, Mantell, 1827
- Megalosaurus phillipsi Welles, Powell & Pickering vide Pickering, 1995, (nomen non rite publicatum)
Nomina dubia (not taxonomically identifiable)
- Megalosaurus horridus (Leidy, 1856) Leidy, 1857, = Deinodon horridus Leidy, 1856
- Megalosaurus cloacinus, Quenstedt, 1858, = Plateosaurus cloacinus (Quenstedt, 1858) Huene, 1905, = Gresslyosaurus cloacinus (Quenstedt, 1858) Huene, 1932
- Megalosaurus insignis Eudes-Delongchamps & Lennier vide Lennier, 1870 (nomen dubium), = Streptospondylus insignis (Eudes-Deslongchamps & Lennier vide Lennier, 1870) Depéret & Savornin, 1928; = Erectopus insignis (Eudes-Deslongchamps & Lennier vide Lennier, 1870) Stromer, 1931
- Megalosaurus meriani Greppin, 1870, = Labrosaurus meriani (Greppin, 1870) Janensch, 1920; = Antrodemus meriani (Greppin, 1870) Steel, 1970; = Allosaurus meriani (Greppin, 1870) Olshevsky, 1978
- Megalosaurus schnaitheimi Bunzel, 1871 (nomen nudum), junior synonym of Dakosaurus maximus (Plieninger, 1846) Quenstedt, 1856
- Megalosaurus obtusus, Henry, 1876, = Plateosaurus obtusus (Henry, 1876) Huene, 1907
- Megalosaurus pannoniensis Seeley, 1881 (nomen dubium)
- Megalosaurus gracilis (Quenstedt, 1885) Douvillé, 1885, = Dakosaurus gracilis Quenstedt, 1885
- Megalosaurus nasicornis (Marsh, 1884) Cope, 1892, = Ceratosaurus nasicornis Marsh, 1884
- Megalosaurus aquilunguis (Cope, 1866) Osborn, 1898, = Laelaps aquilunguis Cope, 1866
- Megalosaurus valens (Leidy, 1870) Nopcsa, 1901, = Poekilopleuron valens Leidy, 1870, = Antrodemus valens (Leidy, 1870) Leidy, 1870, = Allosaurus valens (Leidy, 1870) Gilmore, 1920
- Megalosaurus trihenodon (Cope, 1877) Nopcsa, 1901, = Laelaps trihenodon Cope, 1877
- Megalosaurus hungaricus Nopcsa, 1901 (nomen dubium)
- Megalosaurus lonzeensis Dollo, 1903 (nomen dubium), = Ornithomimus lonzeensis (Dollo, 1903) Kuhn, 1965, = Struthiomimus lonzeensis (Dollo, 1903) Glut, 1997
- Megalosaurus cuvieri (Owen, 1842) Huene, 1907, = Streptospondylus cuvieri Owen, 1842
- Megalosaurus woodwardi Lydekker, 1909 (nomen dubium), senior objective synonym of Megalosaurus lydekkeri Huene, 1926, non Megalosaurus (Magnosaurus) woodwardi (Huene, 1932) Huene, 1932
- Megalosaurus ingens Janensch, 1920, = Ceratosaurus ingens (Janensch, 1920) Paul, 1988
- Megalosaurus poikilopleuron Huene, 1923, junior synonym of Poekilopleuron bucklandii Eudes-Deslongchampus, 1838
- Megalosaurus lydekkeri, Huene, 1926 (nomen dubium) = Megalosaurus woodwardi Lydekker, 1909; = Magnosaurus lydekkeri (Huene, 1926) Huene, 1932
- Megalosaurus terquemi Huene, 1926 (nomen dubium), = Gresslyosaurus terquemi (Huene, 1926) Lapparent, 1967
- Megalosaurus (Magnosaurus) woodwardi (Huene, 1932) Huene, 1932, = Magnosaurus woodwardi Huene, 1932, objective synonym of Sarcosaurus andrewsi Huene, 1932, = Megalosaurus andrewsi (Huene, 1932) Waldman, 1974, non Megalosaurus woodwardi Lydekker, 1909
- Megalosaurus mersensis Lapparent, 1955
- Megalosaurus nicaeensis (Ambayrac, 1913) Romer, 1956, = Aggiosaurus nicaeensis Ambayrac, 1913
- Megalosaurus africanus Huene, 1956, junior objective synonym of Carcharodontosaurus saharicus (Depéret & Savornin, 1925) Stromer, 1931
- Megalosaurus pombali Lapparent & Zbyszewski, 1957
- Megalosaurus silesiacus (Jaekel, 1910) Kuhn, 1965(nomen dubium), = Zanclodon silesiacus Jaekel, 1910
- Megalosaurus inexpectatus Corro, 1966 (nomen dubium)
- Megalosaurus destructor (Owen, 1854) Steel, 1970, = Nuthetes destructor Owen, 1854
- Megalosaurus incognitus (Huene, 1932) Steel, 1970, junior synonym of Iliosuchus incognitus Huene, 1932
- Megalosaurus andrewsi (Huene, 1932) Waldman, 1974, = Sarcosaurus andrewsi Huene, 1932, an objective synonym of Magnosaurus woodwardi Huene, 1932
- Megalosaurus chubutensis Corro, 1974 (nomen dubium)
- Megalosaurus rawesi (Lydekker, 1890) Vianey-Liaud, Jain & Sahni, 1987, = Massospondylus rawesi Lydekker, 1890
- Megalosaurus tanneri (Galton & Jensen, 1979) Paul, 1988, junior synonym of Torvosaurus tanneri Galton & Jensen, 1979
- Megalosaurus schmidti (Kiprijanow, 1883) Olshevsky, 1991, a chimera, = Poekilopleuron schmidti Kiprijanow, 1883
- Megalosaurus ornatus (Huene, 1905) Probst & Windolf, 1993 (nomen vanum), = Plateosaurus ornatus Huene, 1905
- Megalosaurus monasterii (Münster, 1846) per Windolf 1997, = Saurocephalus monasterii Münster, 1846
- Megalosaurus dunkeri, Dames, 1884, = Streptospondylus dunkeri, (Dames, 1884) Depéret & Savornin, 1928, = Prodeinodon dunkeri, (Dames, 1884) Ruiz-Omeñaca & Canudo, 2003
Nomina nuda (insufficiently described)
- Megalosaurus tibetensis Zhao, 1986
- Megalosaurus dapukaensis Zhao, 1986
Reassigned species
- Megalosaurus superbus, Sauvage, 1882 = Erectopus superbus (Sauvage, 1882) Huene, 1923
- Megalosaurus bredai, Seeley, 1883, = Betasuchus bredai (Seeley, 1883) Huene, 1932
- Megalosaurus oweni, Lydekker, 1889, = Altispinax oweni (Lydekker, 1889) Huene, 1923, = Valdoraptor oweni (Lydekker, 1889) Olshevsky, 1991
- Megalosaurus crenatissimus, Depéret, 1896, = Dryptosaurus crenatissimus (Depéret, 1896) Depéret, 1928, = Majungasaurus crenatissimus (Depéret, 1896) Lavocat, 1955, senior synonym of Majungatholus atopus Sues & Taquet 1979
- Megalosaurus bradleyi, Woodward, 1910, = Proceratosaurus bradleyi (Woodward, 1910) Huene, 1926
- Megalosaurus parkeri, Huene, 1923, = Altispinax parkeri (Huene, 1923) Huene, 1932, = Metriacanthosaurus parkeri (Huene, 1923) Walker, 1946
- Megalosaurus nethercombensis, Huene, 1923, = Magnosaurus nethercombensis (Huene, 1923) Huene, 1932
- Megalosaurus saharicus, Depéret & Savornin, 1925, = Megalosaurus (Dryptosaurus) saharicus (Depéret & Savornin, 1925) Depéret & Savornin, 1927; = Carcharodontosaurus saharicus (Depéret & Savornin, 1925) Stromer, 1931, = Megalosaurus africanus (typo)Huene, 1956
- Megalosaurus wetherilli, Welles, 1954, = Dilophosaurus wetherilli (Welles, 1954) Welles, 1970
- Megalosaurus hesperis, Waldman, 1974, = Duriavenator hesperis (Waldman, 1974) Benson, 2008
- ?Megalosaurus cambrensis (Newton, 1899) Molnar, 1990, = Zanclodon cambrensis Newton, 1899 = Gressylosaurus cambrensis (Newton, 1899) Olshevsky, 1991 = Newtonsaurus cambrensis (Newton, 1899), Evans et al., 2025

== Sources ==
- Carrano, M.T.; Benson, R.B.J.; & Sampson, S.D. (2012). "The phylogeny of Tetanurae (Dinosauria: Theropoda)". Journal of Systematic Palaeontology 10(2): 211–300
