= La Penthiève Beds =

Geologic formation in France

- Stratigraphic range: Early Cretaceous, Albian
- Type: Formation
- Sub-units: Mammilatum Zone

Lithology
- Primary: Phosphate

Location
- Region: Louppy-le-Château
- Country: France

The La Penthiève Beds is a geologic formation in Louppy-le-Château, France. It preserves fossils dating back to the Early Cretaceous period.

Part of the formation is known as the Mammilatum Zone, which dates to the lower Albian.

== Paleofauna ==
- Crocodylia indet.
- Dakosaurus sp.
- Erectopus superbus
- Hylaeosaurus sp.
- Pervushovisaurus campylodon
- Plesiosauria indet.
- Polycotylus sp.
- Polyptychodon interruptus

== See also ==
- List of fossiliferous stratigraphic units in France
