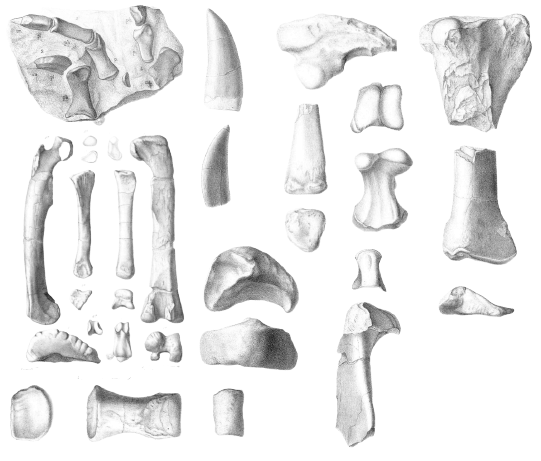
- Elements of the holotype specimen (not to scale of each other)

Scientific classification
- Kingdom: Animalia
- Phylum: Chordata
- Class: Reptilia
- Clade: Dinosauria
- Clade: Saurischia
- Clade: Theropoda
- Clade: †Carnosauria
- Superfamily: †Allosauroidea
- Genus: †Erectopus von Huene, 1922
- Species: †E. superbus

Binomial name
- †Erectopus superbus (Sauvage, 1882) [originally Megalosaurus]

Synonyms
- Megalosaurus superbus Sauvage, 1882; Erectopus sauvagi Huene, 1932

= Erectopus =

Erectopus Temporal range: Early Cretaceous, Albian

Extinct genus of dinosaurs

Erectopus (meaning "upright foot") is an extinct genus of basal allosauroid theropod from the Lower Cretaceous La Penthiève Beds Formation of France and also possibly the Cernavodă Formation of southern Romania. The type species is E. superbus, which was initially known as a species of Megalosaurus.

== Discovery and naming ==
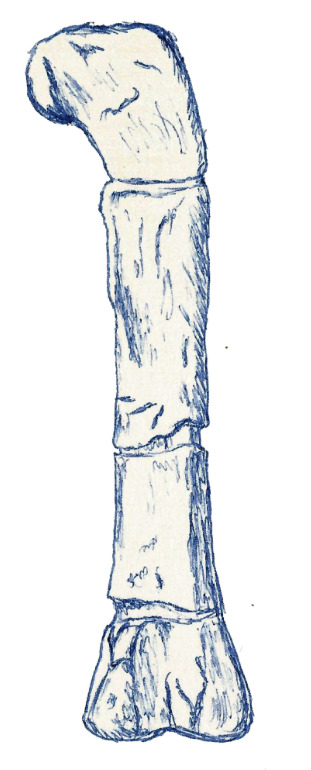
Femur

The holotype, specimen MNHN 2001-4, was discovered during the early 1870s in the phosphate-bearing beds of La Penthiève (Mammilatum Zone; lower Albian) at Louppy-le-Château in eastern France, which have also produced remains of plesiosaurs, ichthyosaurs, and crocodiles. The fossils originally resided in the private collection of Louis Pierson. The first, two teeth and a vertebra, were first described by Charles Barrois in 1875. After more remains had been found, in 1882 Henri-Émile Sauvage made them the basis for a new taxon, Megalosaurus superbus. In 1923, the material was redescribed by Friedrich von Huene, who argued that it could not be included within the genus Megalosaurus and created for the Pierson theropod a separate genus, naming the species Erectopus superbus. In 1932 von Huene concluded that the original fossils described by Barrois were not necessarily of the same species as the later finds. Assuming that Sauvage had used the former as the holotype of Megalosaurus superbus, he therefore created another species: Erectopus sauvagei. Von Huene even declined to use the generic name Erectopus for the first species, indicating it as "Gen. indeterm. superbus", which however does not constitute a valid name.

Subsequently, the Pierson collection was dispersed after the death of its owner and the holotype was long believed lost to science after World War II. However, casts of some of the bones have been located in the Muséum National d'Histoire Naturelle (MNHN, Paris), and the anterior part of a left maxilla, described by Sauvage in 1882, was found through a Parisian fossil dealer in the late 20th century and purchased by Christian de Muison, a paleontologist at the MNHN. The casts and the incomplete maxilla allowed for a reevaluation of Erectopus by Ronan Allain in 2005, which determined that the correct taxonomic name for the material is E. superbus, as nothing indicated that Sauvage had limited the holotype to the original teeth. The recovered maxilla has been designated a lectotype, and the casts of Pierson's specimen has become the plastotype for the taxon. The plastotype includes a partial right manus, the left femur, left calcaneum, the proximal and distal halves of the left tibia, and right metatarsal II. The combined inventory number for the syntypes is MNHN 2001-4.

A tooth, specimen UAIC (SCM1) 615, discovered sometime between 1900 and 1913 in the Cernavodă Formation in Romania was listed as belonging to Megalosaurus (Erectopus) cf. superbus by Simonescu (1913) and later by Csiki-Sava et al. (2016), although it most likely belonged to Carcharodontosauridae.

Erectopus features on the coat of arms of Louppy-le-Château, France

== Description ==
Allain (2005) diagnoses Erectopus superbus as follows: "Rounded anterior ramus of maxilla; slender neck of femur; posterior curvature of proximal half of femur; anterodorsal edge of calcaneum dorsally projected; calcaneum twice as long as deep vertically; posteromedial process for tibia on articular surface of astragalus; length of second metatarsal equal to half the length of femur; lateral margin of proximal end of second metatarsal regularly concave."

Allain estimated the weight at 200 kilograms (440 lb). In 2016 it was estimated to be 5 meters (16 ft) in length and 315 kg (694 lbs) in weight.

== Classification ==
Based on the morphology of the distal end of the tibia and the inferred morphology of the astragalus, Allain (2005) placed Erectopus superbus within the Allosauroidea (a concept equivalent to Carnosauria, a term some researchers prefer). It is the third youngest carnosaur known from the European Lower Cretaceous, after specimen MM-2-21, the "Montmirat theropod" (Valanginian) of southern France and Neovenator salerii (Barremian) from the Isle of Wight. Carrano et al. (2012) commented that Erectopus may be a metricanthosaurid, but didn't list shared characters.
