= Dapuka Group =

- Stratigraphic range: Middle Jurassic, 174.70–161.53 Ma
- Type: Geological formation
- Underlies: Dayer Formation
- Overlies: Kenzuoga Formation
- Area: Tibet Autonomous Region
- Thickness: Up to 1,187 metres (3,894 ft)

Lithology
- Primary: Sandstone and mudstone
- Other: Siltstone and shale

Location
- Country: China
- Extent: Chando, Chaya County, and Leiniaoqi

Type section
- Named for: Dapuka Village
- Named by: Zhao Xijin (1985)

The Dapuka Group, also known as the Dabuka Group and was previously listed as the Dapuka Formation, is a geological formation in the Tibet Autonomous Region, China. It dates back to the Middle Jurassic.

== Vertebrate fauna ==
Dinosaurs of the Dapuka Group
Taxa	Presence	Description	Images
Genus: Lancanjiangosaurus; 1. Lancanjiangosaurus cachuensis.	1. Geographically located in Xinjiang Uyghur Autonomous Region, China.		
Genus: Ngexisaurus; 1. N. dapukaensis.	1. Geographically located in Xinjiang Uyghur Autonomous Region, China.		
Infraorder: Sauropoda; 1. Unnamed genus.	1. Geographically located in Xinjiang Uyghur Autonomous Region, China.		
Infraorder: Stegosauria; 1. Possible unnamed stegosaur.	1. Geographically located in Xinjiang Uyghur Autonomous Region, China.		

== See also ==
- List of dinosaur-bearing rock formations
