= Louppy-le-Château =

- Commune
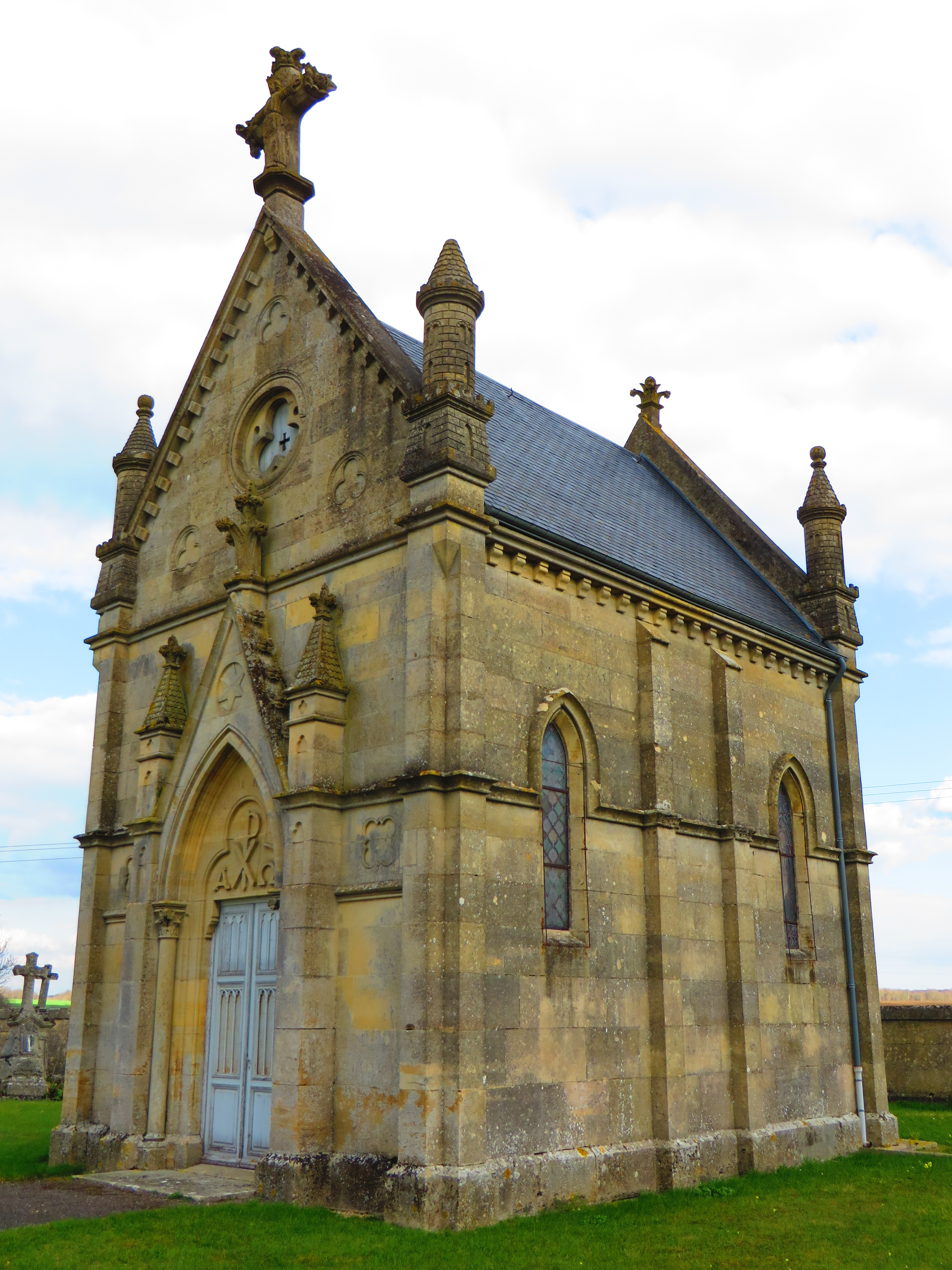
- The cemetery chapel in Louppy-le-Château

- Coat of arms
- Location of Louppy-le-Château
- Location within France Location within Grand Est
- Coordinates: 48°52′04″N 5°04′37″E
- Country: France
- Region: Grand Est
- Department: Meuse
- Arrondissement: Bar-le-Duc
- Canton: Revigny-sur-Ornain
- Intercommunality: CC de l'Aire à l'Argonne

Government
  - Mayor (2020–2026): Pierre-Louis Molitor
- Area^{1}: 18.76 km^{2} (7.24 sq mi)
- Elevation: 196 m (643 ft)
- Highest elevation: 232 m (761 ft)
- Lowest elevation: 163 m (535 ft)
- Population (2023): 155
  - Density: 8.26/km^{2} (21.4/sq mi)
- Time zone: UTC+01:00 (CET)
  - Summer (DST): UTC+02:00 (CEST)
- INSEE/Postal code: 55304 /55800
- ^{1} French Land Register data, which excludes lakes, ponds, glaciers > 1 km^{2} (0.386 sq mi or 247 acres) and river estuaries.

Louppy-le-Château (French pronunciation: [lupi lə ʃato]) is a commune in the Meuse department in Grand Est in north-eastern France. The coat of arms includes the dinosaur Erectopus, which was discovered nearby during the 1870s. The dinosaur on the coat-of-arms is based on an illustration by Timothy J. Bradley website.

== Geography ==
The village lies in the middle of the commune, on the left bank of The Chée, which flows northwestward through the middle of the commune.

== See also ==
- Communes of the Meuse department
