= Museum of Fine Arts, Houston =

Art museum in Houston, Texas

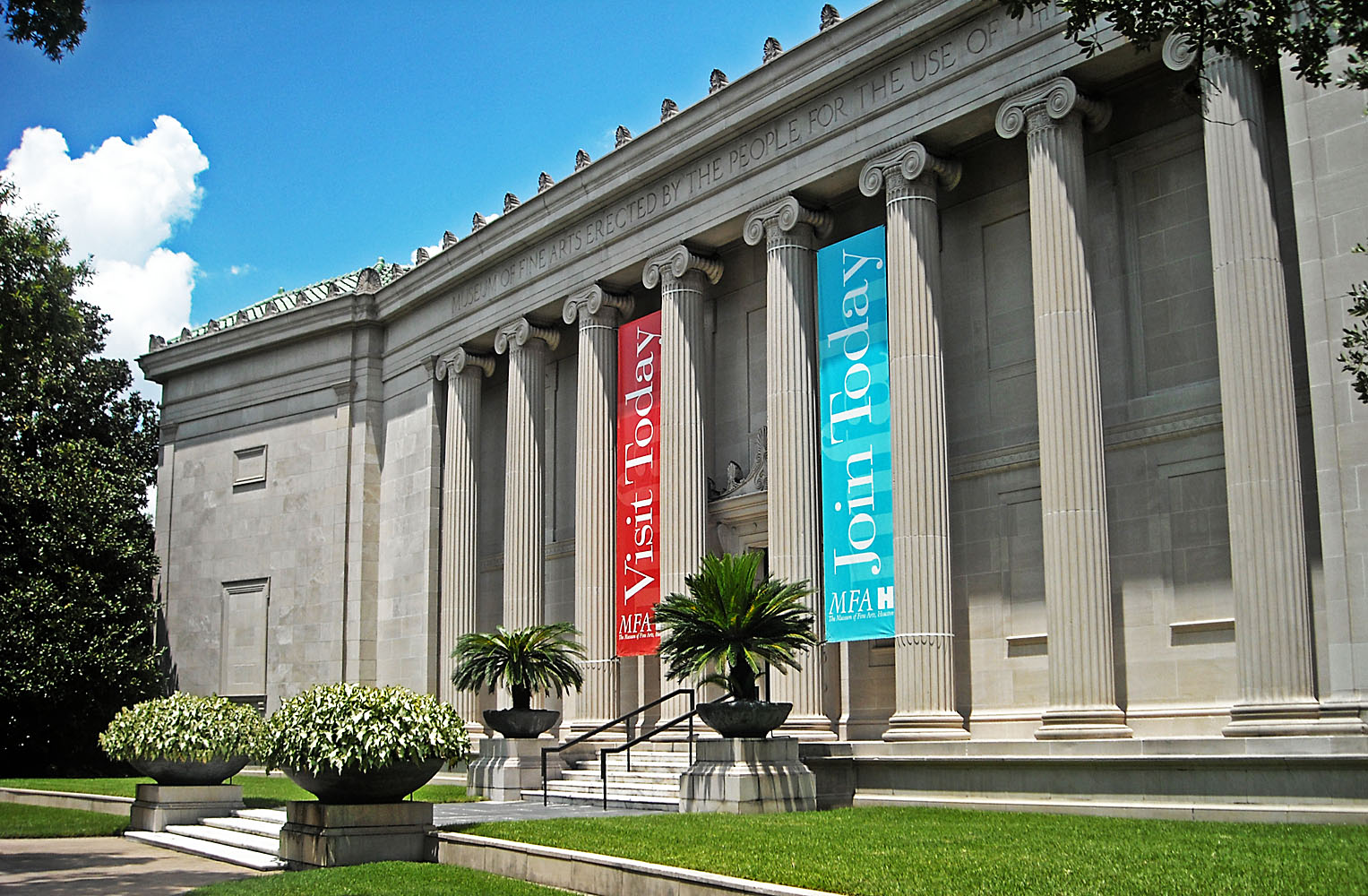
- Facade of the original Watkin Building
- Interactive fullscreen map
- Established: 1900
- Location: 1001 Bissonnet; Houston, TX 77005 United States
- Coordinates: 29°43′32″N 95°23′26″W
- Type: Art museum, institute, sculpture park
- Director: Gary Tinterow
- Public transit access: Red Line Museum District
- Website: www.mfah.org

The Museum of Fine Arts, Houston (MFAH), is an art museum located in the Museum District of Houston, Texas. The permanent collection of the museum spans more than 5,000 years of history with nearly 80,000 works from six continents.

In 1917, the museum site was dedicated by the Houston Public School Art League (later the Houston Art League) with the intention of becoming a public art museum. The first museum building was opened to the public in 1924. The original building, designed by Houston architect William Ward Watkin in the Greek Neoclassical style, is the oldest art museum in Texas. Today, the main campus encompasses the Caroline Wiess Law Building for pre-Columbian art, Asian art, and temporary exhibits, the Audrey Jones Beck Building for European and Egyptian art, the Nancy and Rich Kinder Building for contemporary and modern art, and the Sarah Campbell Blaffer Foundation Center for Conservation for Renaissance and Baroque art. In addition, it also includes the Glassell School of Art, the Lillie and Hugh Roy Cullen Sculpture Garden, and the Central Administration Building. Off campus, it also owns and operates two house museums, Bayou Bend and Rienzi, as well as a facility for conservation, storage and archives.

By gallery space, it is the tenth-largest museum in the world, and the second-largest art museum in the Americas. Following an eight-year campus redevelopment project in the 21st century, the Nancy and Rich Kinder Building opened in 2020. In 2023, the museum received over 900,000 visitors, making it the 20th most-visited museum in the United States.

== Facilities ==
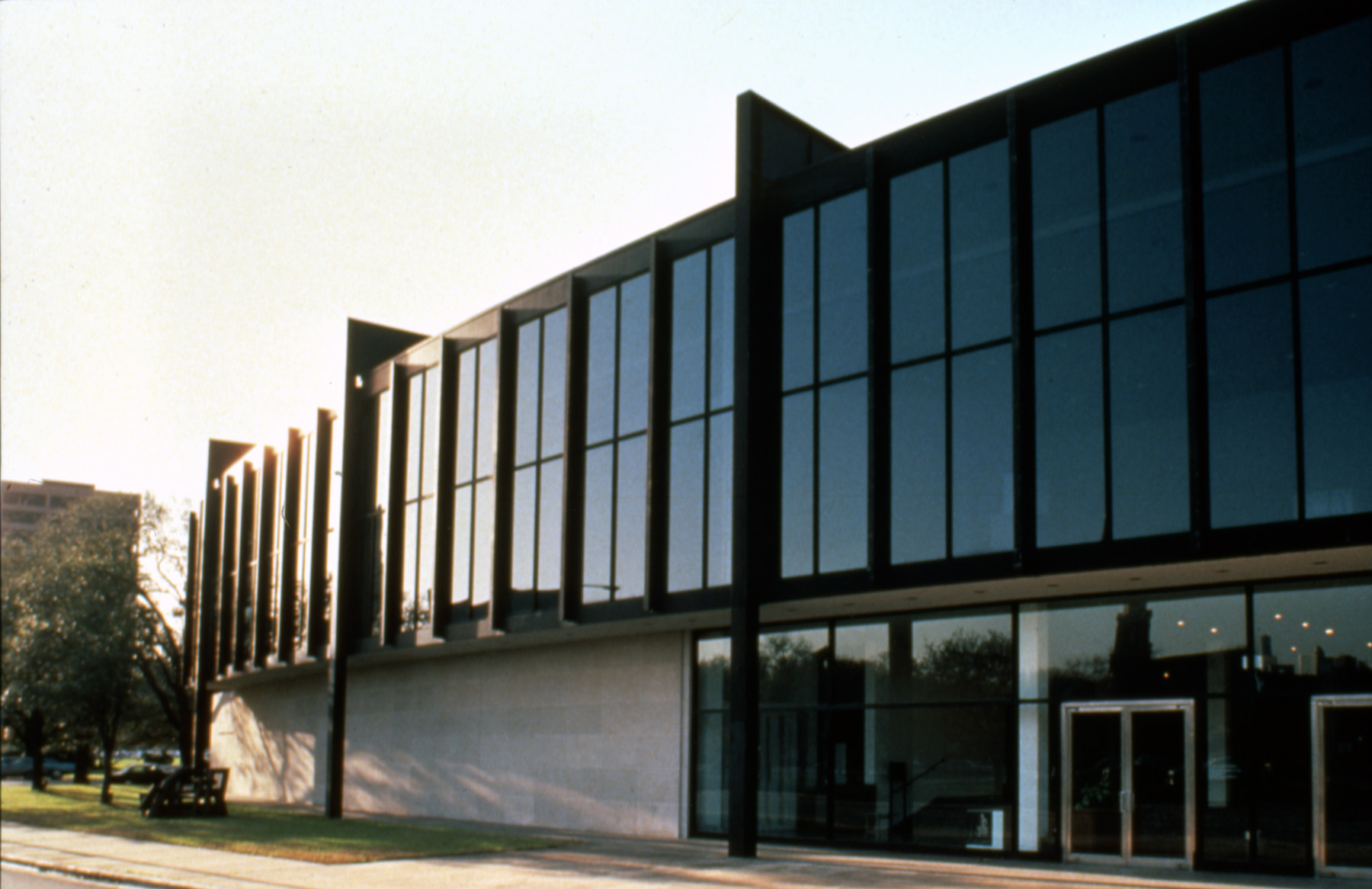
Caroline Wiess Law Building

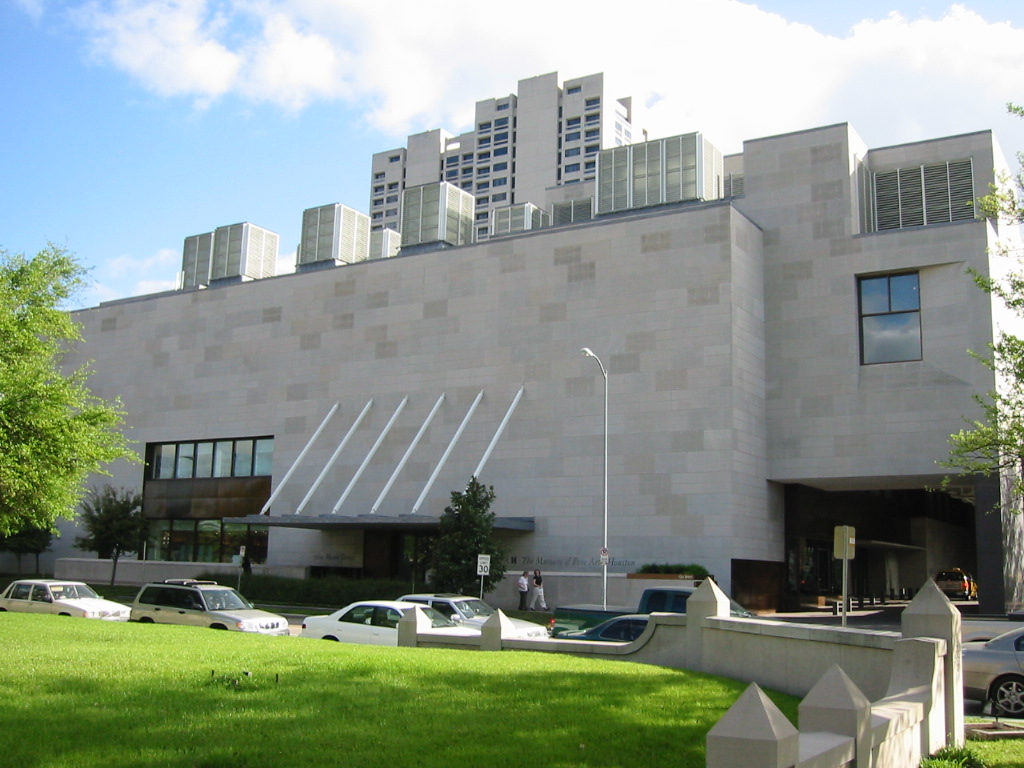
Audrey Jones Beck Building

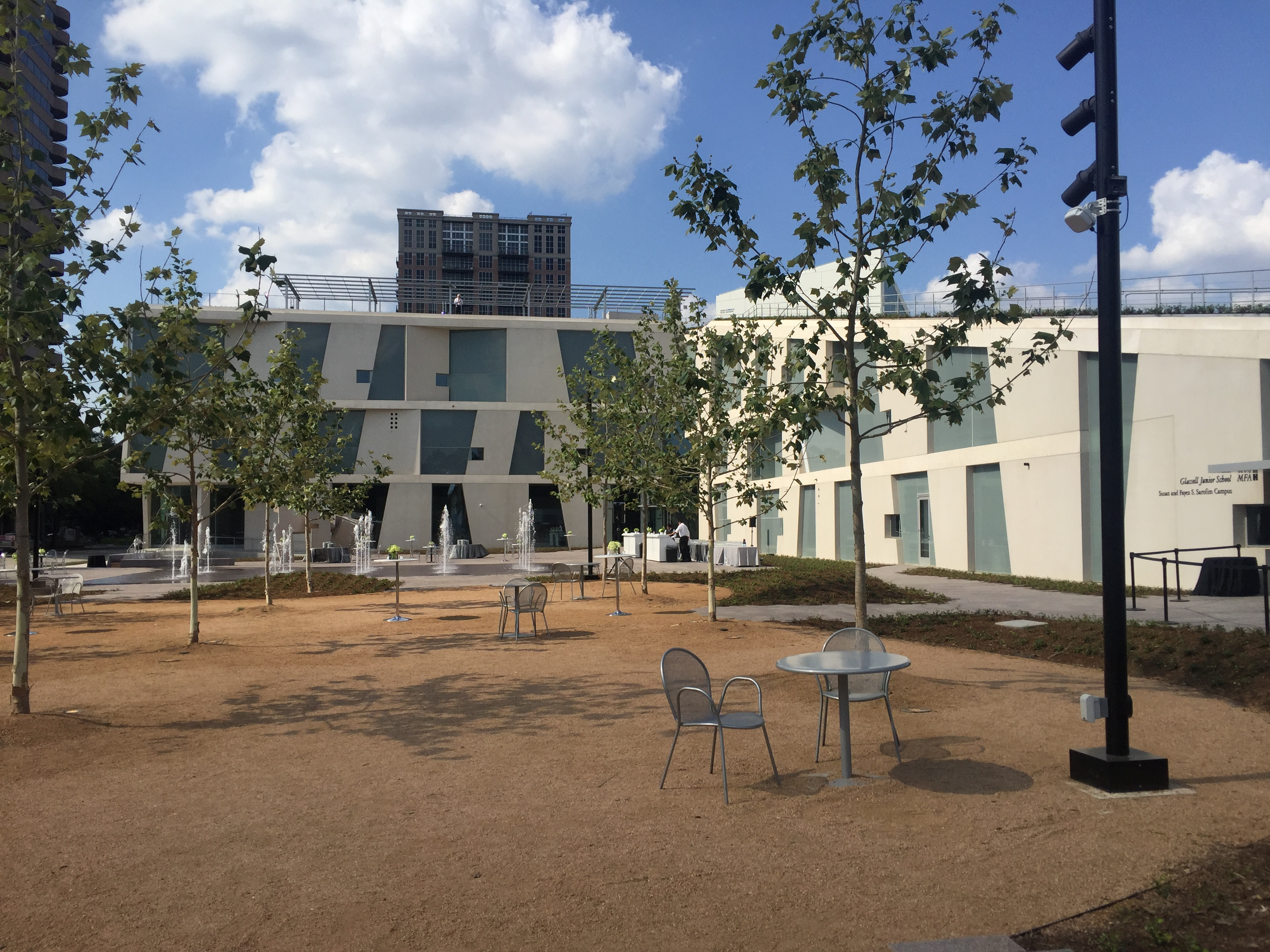
Glassell School of Art

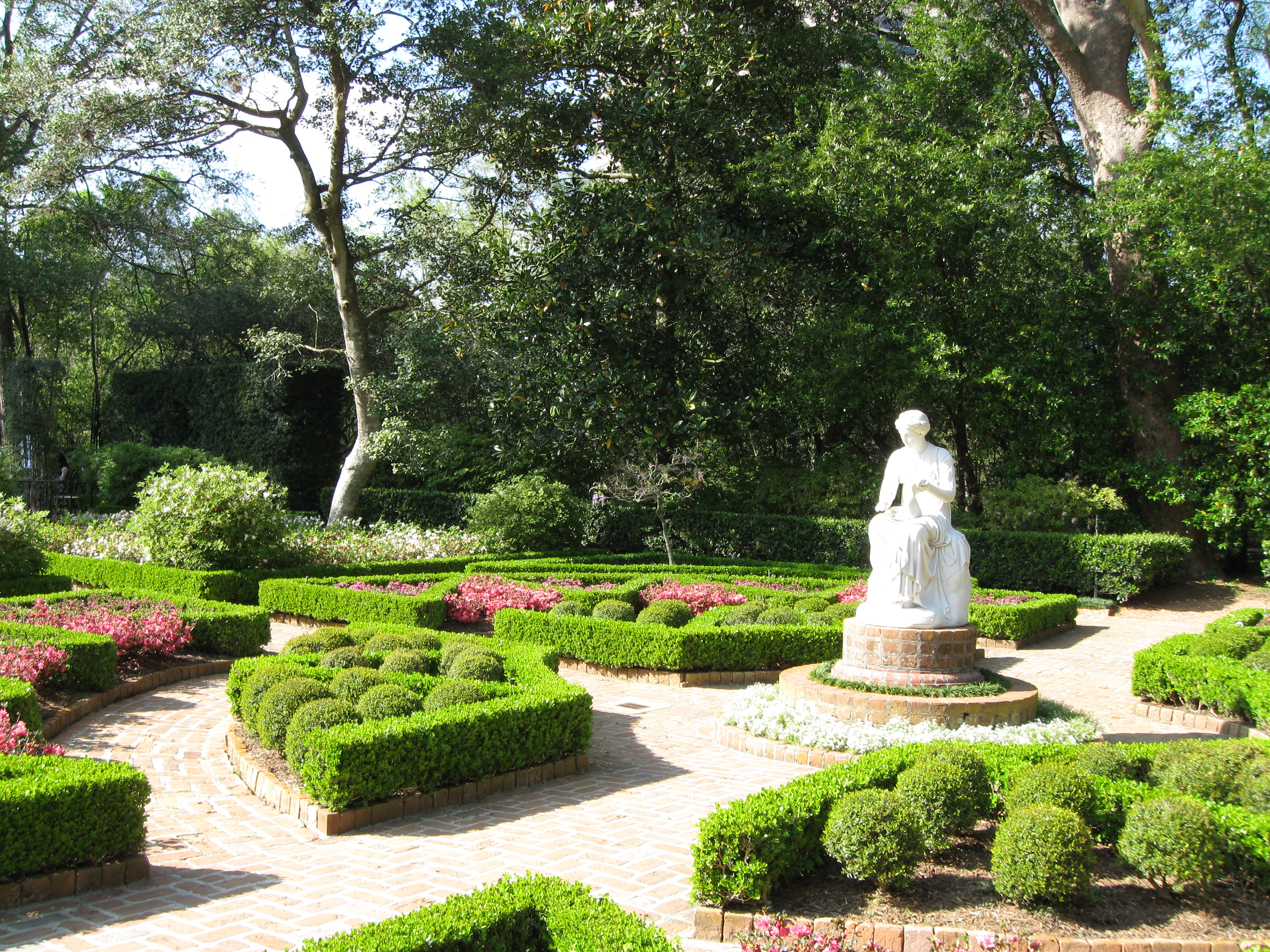
Gardens at Bayou Bend, donated by Ima Hogg

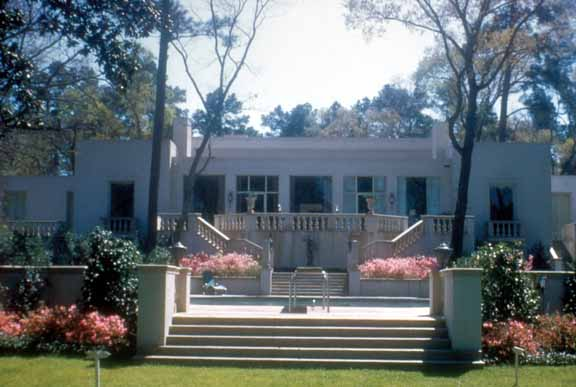
Rienzi

The MFAH's permanent collection totals nearly 80,000 pieces in over 300,000 square feet (28,000 m^{2}) of exhibition space,placing it second in size to the Metropolitan Museum in the United States. The museum's collections and programs are housed in nine facilities. The Susan and Fayez S. Sarofim Campus encompasses 14 acres including seven of the facilities, with two additional facilities, Bayou Bend and Rienzi (house museums) at off site locations. The main public collections and exhibitions are in the Law, Beck, and Kinder buildings. The Law and Beck buildings have over 130,000 square feet (12,000 m^{2}) of exhibition space.

=== The Susan and Fayez S. Sarofim Campus ===
- Caroline Wiess Law Building – the original neo-classical building was designed in phases by architect William Ward Watkin. The original Caroline Wiess Law building was constructed in 1924 and the east and west wing were added in 1926.
- The Robert Lee Blaffer Memorial Wing was designed by Kenneth Franzheim and opened to the public in 1953. The new construction included significant structural improvements to several existing galleries—most notably, air conditioning. Two subsequent additions, Cullinan Hall and the Brown Pavilion, designed by Ludwig Mies van der Rohe were built in 1958 and 1974 respectively. This section of the Museum of Fine Arts, Houston campus is the only Mies-designed museum in the United States. The Caroline Wiess Law building provides a space in which to exhibit temporary and traveling exhibitions, as well as installations of Islamic art, Pacific Island and Australian art, Asian art, Indonesian gold artworks, and Mesoamerican and sub-Saharan African art. Of special interest is the Glassell Collection of African Gold, the largest assemblage of its kind in the world, donated by museum chairman Alfred C. Glassell Jr. The Nidhika and Pershant Mehta Arts of India is the only space in Houston dedicated exclusively to Indian Arts and Culture, though the Crow also exhibits Indian art.
- Audrey Jones Beck Building – Opened to the public in 2000, the Beck Building was designed by Rafael Moneo, a Pritzker Architecture Prize Laureate. The museum Trustees elected to name the building after Audrey Jones Beck in honor of the large collection she had donated to the museum several decades prior. In addition to traveling exhibitions and rotating temporary shows of photography, prints and drawings on the lower levels, the building displays the permanent collections of antiquities, European, and American art up to 1900, including the Impressionist.
- Nancy and Rich Kinder Building – In 2012, the museum selected Steven Holl Architects to design a 164,000 sq ft (15,200 m^{2}) expansion that primarily holds galleries for art after 1900. Opened to the public in November 2020, the new building occupies a two-acre site north of the Caroline Wiess Law Building. The new MFAH building is adjacent to Lillie and Hugh Roy Cullen Sculpture Garden and an expanded Glassell School of Art. In addition to a theater, restaurant, café, and seven small gardens and reflecting pools inset along the building's perimeter, the 237,213 square-foot Kinder building increases the museums overall exhibition space by nearly 75 percent. In 2021, The Bastion Collection opened Le Jardinier, a contemporary French restaurant emphasizing the highest-quality, seasonal ingredients from Michelin-starred chef Alain Verzeroli, and Italian-inspired Cafe Leonelli.
- Lillie and Hugh Roy Cullen Sculpture Garden – was designed by US-born artist and landscape architect Isamu Noguchi and opened in 1986. The Lillie and Hugh Roy Cullen Sculpture Garden houses more than twenty-five works by artists from the nineteenth, twentieth, and twenty-first centuries from the MFAH and other major collections.
- Glassell School of Art – was founded in 1979, with an original building, now demolished, designed by architect S. I. Morris. In 2014, a new L-shaped building was designed by Steven Holl, which features a ramped amphitheater leading up to the walkable PNC Roof Garden. The 80,000 sq ft (7,400 m^{2}) building sits on top of an extensive underground parking garage, and it opens onto the Lillie and Hugh Roy Cullen Sculpture Garden, offering additional outdoor space for programs and performances. It offers a wide range of classes, workshops, and educational opportunities to students of all ages, interests, experiences, through the Studio School for Adults, the Glassell Junior School, as well as Community Bridge Programs, special programs for youths, and the Core Artist-in-Residence Program.
- Central Administration Building – The building, opened in 1994 and designed by Texan architectural designer Carlos Jimenez, houses the museum's administrative functions.
- The Sarah Campbell Blaffer Foundation Center for Conservation – is a 37,864-square-foot conservation center designed by Lake-Flato Architects that was completed in 2018. It is home to conservation labs and studios located above the museum's parking garage. It is not open to the public.

=== Other facilities ===
- Bayou Bend Collection and Gardens – features a collection of American decorative art and furniture. The Bayou Bend Collection and Gardens, former home of Life Trustee Ima Hogg, was designed by architect John F. Staub in 1927. Hogg donated the property to the MFAH in 1957, followed, in 1962, by the donation of its collection of paintings, furniture, ceramics, glass, metals, and textiles. Bayou Bend was officially dedicated and opened to the public in 1966. Situated on 14 acres (57,000 m^{2}) of formal and woodland gardens five miles (8 km) from the main museum campus, the historic house museum documents American decorative and fine arts from the seventeenth to the mid-nineteenth centuries.
- Rienzi – the MFAH house museum for European decorative arts, Rienzi was donated to the MFAH by Carroll Sterling Masterson and Harris Masterson III in 1991. The residence, named for Rienzi Johnston, Masterson's grandfather, is situated on 4.4 acres (18,000 m^{2}) in Homewood Addition, surrounded by Houston's River Oaks neighborhood. The structure was designed in 1952 by John F. Staub, the same architect who designed Bayou Bend. Completed in 1954, Rienzi served as both a family home and a center for Houston civic and philanthropic activity from the 1950s through the mid-1990s. After Masterson's death, the MFAH transformed the home into a museum and subsequently opened it to the public in 1999.

== History of the Collection ==
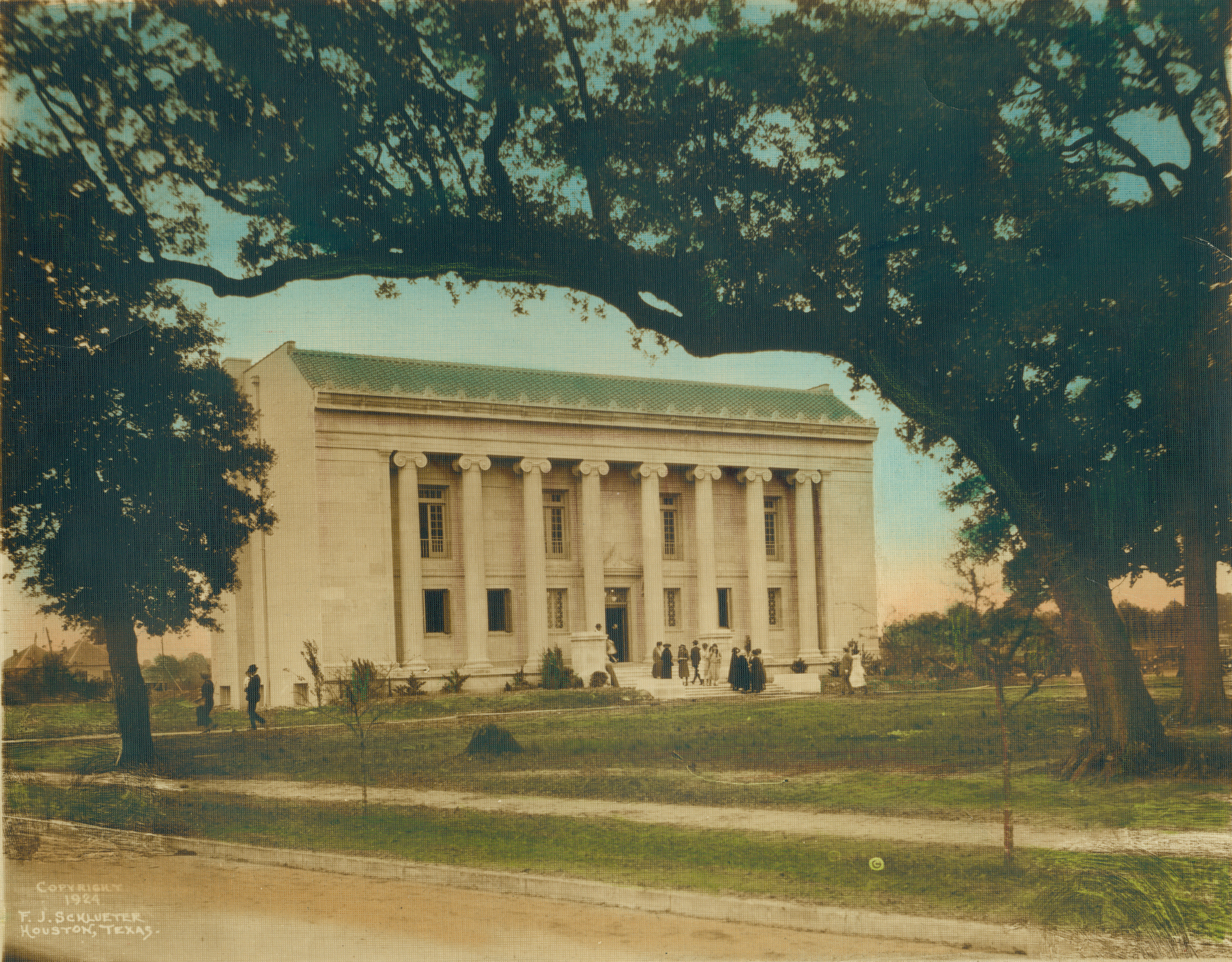
Watkin Building, 1924

With approximately 80,000 works of art, the largest part of the museum's collection lie in the areas of Italian Renaissance painting, Baroque painting, French Impressionism, photography, American and European decorative arts, African and pre-Columbian gold, American art, and post-1945 European and American painting and sculpture. Other facets of the collection include African-American art and Texas painting. Emerging collection interests of modern and contemporary Latin American art, including the artwork of many Texas Latino artists, Asian art, and Islamic art continue to strengthen the museum's collection diversity. As a result of its encyclopedic collection, the museum ranks nationally among the top ten art museums in attendance.

=== Collection Beginnings ===
Prior to the opening of the permanent museum building in 1924, George M. Dickson bequeathed to the collection its first important American and European oil paintings. In the 1930s, Houstonian Annette Finnigan began her donation of antiquities and Texas philanthropist Ima Hogg gave her collection of avant-garde European prints and drawings. Ima Hogg's gift was followed by the subsequent donations of her Southwest Native American and Frederic Remington collections during the 1940s.

Over the next two decades, gifts from prominent Houston families and foundations concentrated on European art from the fifteenth to twentieth centuries, contemporary painting and sculpture, and African, Oceanic and Pre-Columbian art. Among these are the gifts of Life Trustees Sarah Campbell Blaffer, Dominique de Menil and Alice N. Hanzsen as well as that of the Samuel H. Kress Foundation. Augmented by museum purchases, the permanent collection numbered 12,000 objects by 1970.

=== European Paintings ===
The 1944 bequest of eighty-three Renaissance paintings, sculptures and works on paper from renowned New York collectors Edith and Percy S. Straus formed the "cornerstone" of the museum's European collection, one that "fundamentally changed the scope and importance" of it and "placed the museum on the map." Prior to this gift, the European collection had only twelve paintings. Percy S. Straus, who had been advised by several leading scholars of the day, is credited with assembling one of the best private collections formed in the U.S. in the 1920s and 30s. He donated paintings by many famous European artists to the MFAH, including Fra Angelico, Sandro Botticelli, Giovanni Bellini, Rogier van der Weyden, Hans Memling, Peter Paul Rubens, and Anthony van Dyck, as well as high quality works by some anonymous artists.

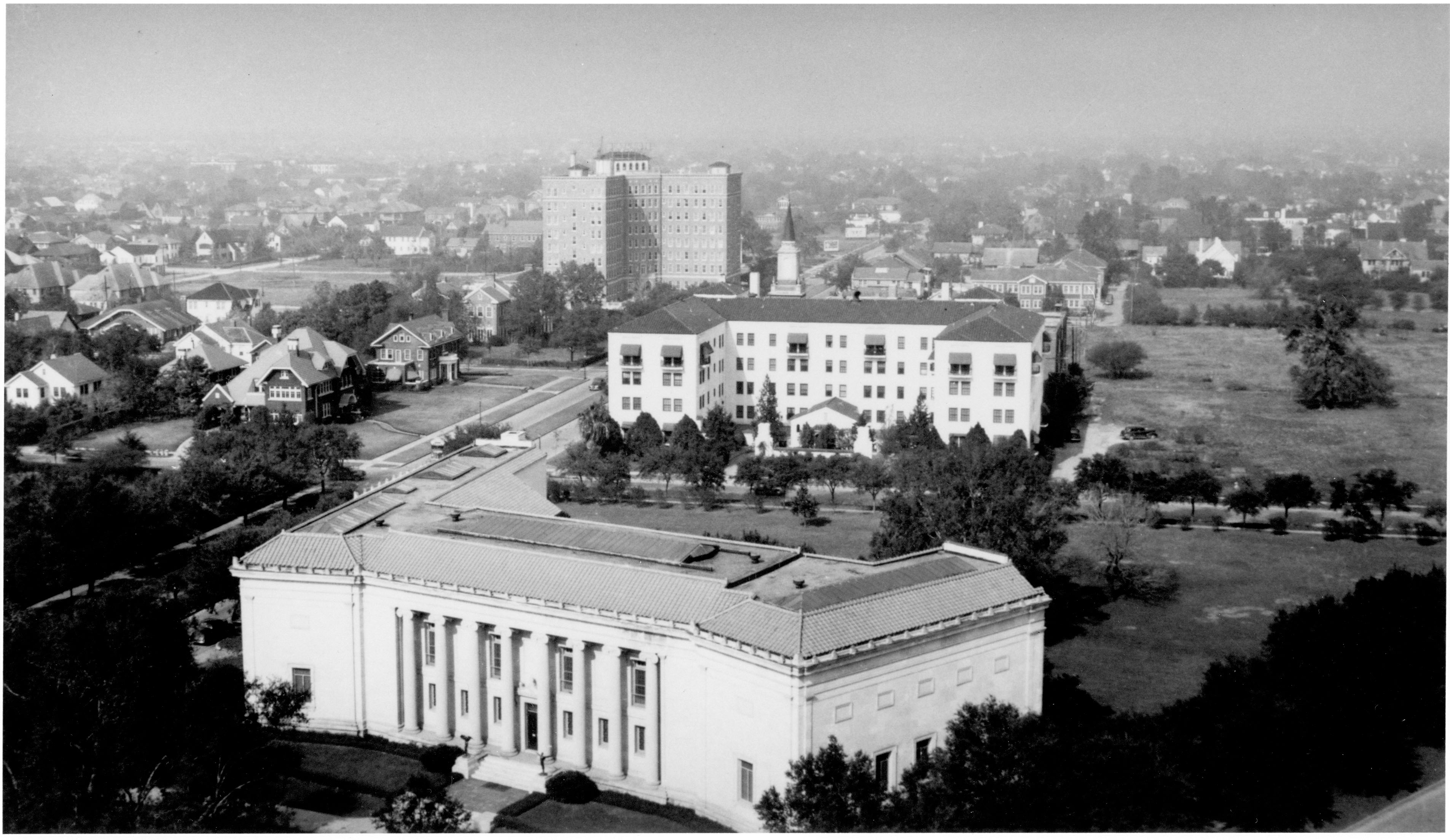
Museum c. 1926

The MFAH collection nearly doubled from 1970 to 1989, fueled by continued donations of art along with the advent of both accession endowment funding and corporate giving. In 1974, John and Audrey Jones Beck placed on long-term loan fifty Impressionist and Post-Impressionist masterpieces, augmenting the museum's already strong Impressionist collection. This collection would never leave the MFAH, formally entering its holdings in 1998 as a gift of Life Trustee Audrey Jones Beck. The collection is permanently displayed in the building that bears her name.

On the heels of the Cullen Foundation's funding of the MFAH's first accessions endowment in 1970, the Brown Foundation, Inc., launched a challenge grant in 1976 that would stay in effect for twenty years. It raised funds for both accessions and operational costs in landmark amounts, and providing incentive for additional community support. Also in 1976, the photography collection was established with Target Stores’ first corporate grant to the museum. In 2011 the MFAH had the sixth-largest endowment among art museums in the country.

=== Modern Latin America and Latino Art ===
In 2001, the MFAH established the International Center for the Arts of the Americas (ICAA), the leading research institute for 20th-century Latin American and Latino art. The ICAA was a pioneer in collecting, exhibiting and researching the artistic production of Latin American and Latinx communities, including artists from Mexico, Central and South America, the Caribbean, and artists of Latin American descent living and working in the United States. Through the ICAA, the MFAH helped to bring about a long-term transformation in the appreciation and understanding of Latin American and Latinx visual arts in the United States and abroad. According to Edward Sullivan, who is the deputy director of the Institute of Fine Arts in New York, the ICAA is the "premier institution internationally for the exhibition and promotion of interest in Latin American art.”

Caroline Wiess Law's 2007 gift of more than $400 million dollars jump started the museum's acquisition program, as did the enhanced space made possible by the Kinder building. According to director Gary Tinterow, “From around 2000, since the opening of the Beck Building, designed by Rafael Moneo, we had approximately 1,200 square feet devoted to 20th-century art.” With the new building, that amount approached 150,000 square feet. $60 million was utilized over 20 years to develop a Latinx collection and create the institute.

Within the Kinder building, "Latin American and Latino work represent 24 percent of the art on display there, shown in lively exchange with European and American art, photography, prints and drawings, design and craft." South American artists such as Lygia Clark, Gego, and Joaquín Torres-García (and artists in the latter's taller) are well-represented in the collection, as are Venezuelan abstract artists. The museum also commissioned a site-specific, "monumental, multi-sensory crochet artwork" by Brazilian Ernesto Neto. Visitors walk through this giant, moving spiral, which is suspended from the ceiling, from one end to the other. A museum website has an extensive listing of Latin American artists in the collection (and on long-term loan).

Google Arts & Culture featured a display titled "Latino Experience in the USA: Works from the MFAH Collection" with highlights of Latinx art from the MFAH's collection. The museum has also launched a multi-year, institution-wide initiative called ¡Aquí Estamos!: Latinx Art at the Museum of Fine Arts, Houston.

=== African American Art ===
In 2016, a Texas critic wrote: "More than any other Houston museum, the MFAH has a checkered history with African American artists and audiences: when local hero John Biggers won the museum purchase prize in the Houston Artists Exhibition in 1950, he famously wasn’t allowed to attend the award ceremony because it was a white-only event." Since that time, the museum has made diversity and inclusivity efforts for its African American collections and exhibitions. Alvia Wardlaw, a curator who retired in 2009, mounted shows dedicated to Thornton Dial, Kermit Oliver, Roy DeCarvera, and Gee's Bend quilts.

A goal is to bring people together to promote understanding. In the context of African American art, numerous pieces, including loans, speak to the stories, heritage, and lifestyles of these artists and their community. Themes of particular concern to the African American community and its history include racial discrimination, civil rights, and racial injustice, and the generational impacts of slavery and racism. Statements: African American Art from the Museum’s Collection, a permanent collection exhibition from 2016 addressed these issues. In 2020, the museum presented the exhibition, Soul of a Nation: Art in the Age of Black Power, which featured the works of numerous black artists expressing the revolutionary achievements of the black community and establishing their identity in the 1960s and 1980s. Works such as Kehinde Wiley's Judith and Holofernes and Kara Walker's Slaughter of the Innocents (They Might Be Guilty of Something) treat themes of oppression and its ensuing multi-generations impact on the African American community.Local artists commissioned or employed by the museum showcase their work outside of the museum in various gallery locations in Houston, targeting areas with higher rates of African American residency to reach members of the Black community.

=== Islamic Art ===
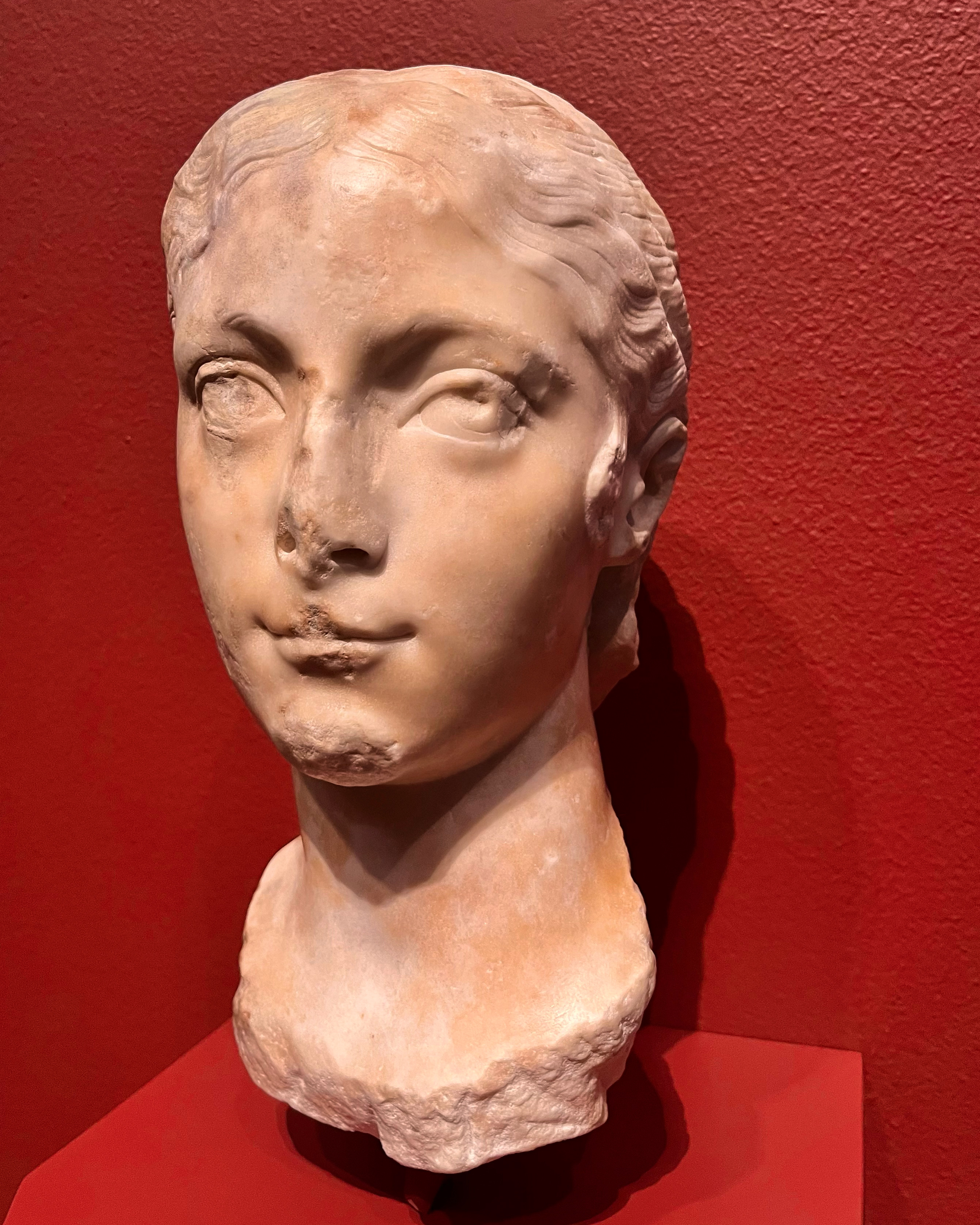
Bust of Plautilla, wife of Caracalla

Since 2019, the Hossein Afshar Collection, one of the world's most distinguished private collections of Persian art, has been on loan to MFAH. The museum has organised two exhibitions of this collection.

== Claim for restitution ==
In 2021 the Monuments Men Foundation announced that it had located a painting from the collection of Max Emden in the Museum of Fine Arts, Houston (MFAH). According to the foundation, the painting by Bernardo Bellotto, called The Marketplace at Pirna, had an inaccurate provenance that concealed the history of the painting. After the MFAH refused to restitute the painting the Emden heirs filed a lawsuit in the Southern District of Texas.

The museum, which had rejected the Emden heirs’ claims since 2007, disagreed with the characterization of the painting as having been subject to a forced or duress sale due to Nazi persecution. MFAH director Gary Tinterow stated that Emden sold the painting voluntarily and, that after consulting provenance and legal experts, “we concluded that we had good title.” Tinterow argued that "as a private American institution, the Houston museum is not bound by the same moral criteria as the German government".

In a highly unusual move, the Monuments Men Foundation published a critical analysis of the provenance research conducted by the researcher hired by the MFAH, noting that she had failed to check the back of the painting for labels and substituted personal opinion in the place of evidence. The Report is titled: "Monuments Men Foundation Analysis of the Museum of Fine Arts, Houston Research Report on Bernardo Bellotto, Marketplace at Pirna, prepared by Ms. Laurie Stein".

The challenge to the Museum's ownership of the painting was definitively resolved in May 2024, when the United States Court of Appeals unanimously affirmed the decision of the lower courts to dismiss the lawsuit and ruled in the Museum's favor. The ruling was the third appeal to reject the plaintiffs’ claim of ownership.

== Galleries ==
Arts of Africa, the Indigenous Pacific Islands, Australia, and the Americas [* = mixed media: ** = painted wood: *** = earthenware]

Arts of Asia and the Islamic Worlds

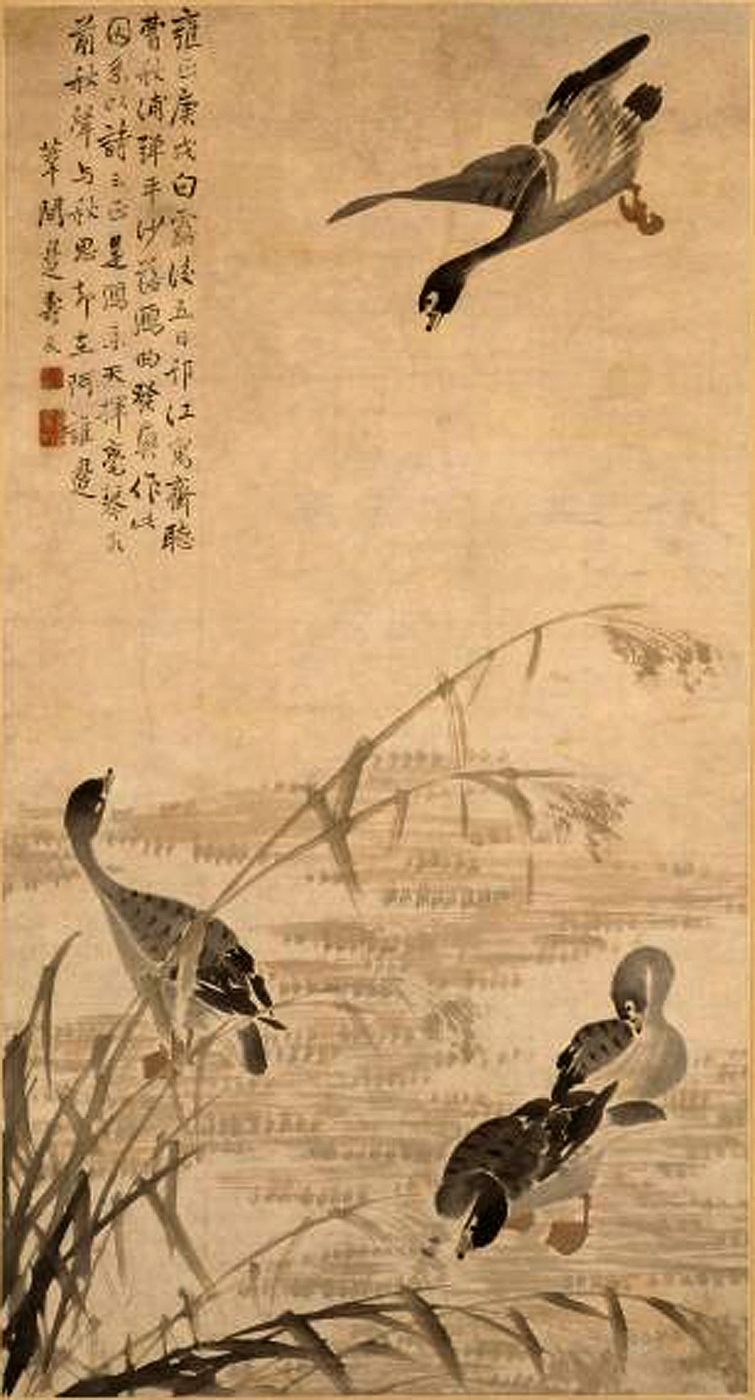
Bian Shoumin, Wild Geese on Sandbank (1730), ink on paper, 132.1 × 70.2 cm

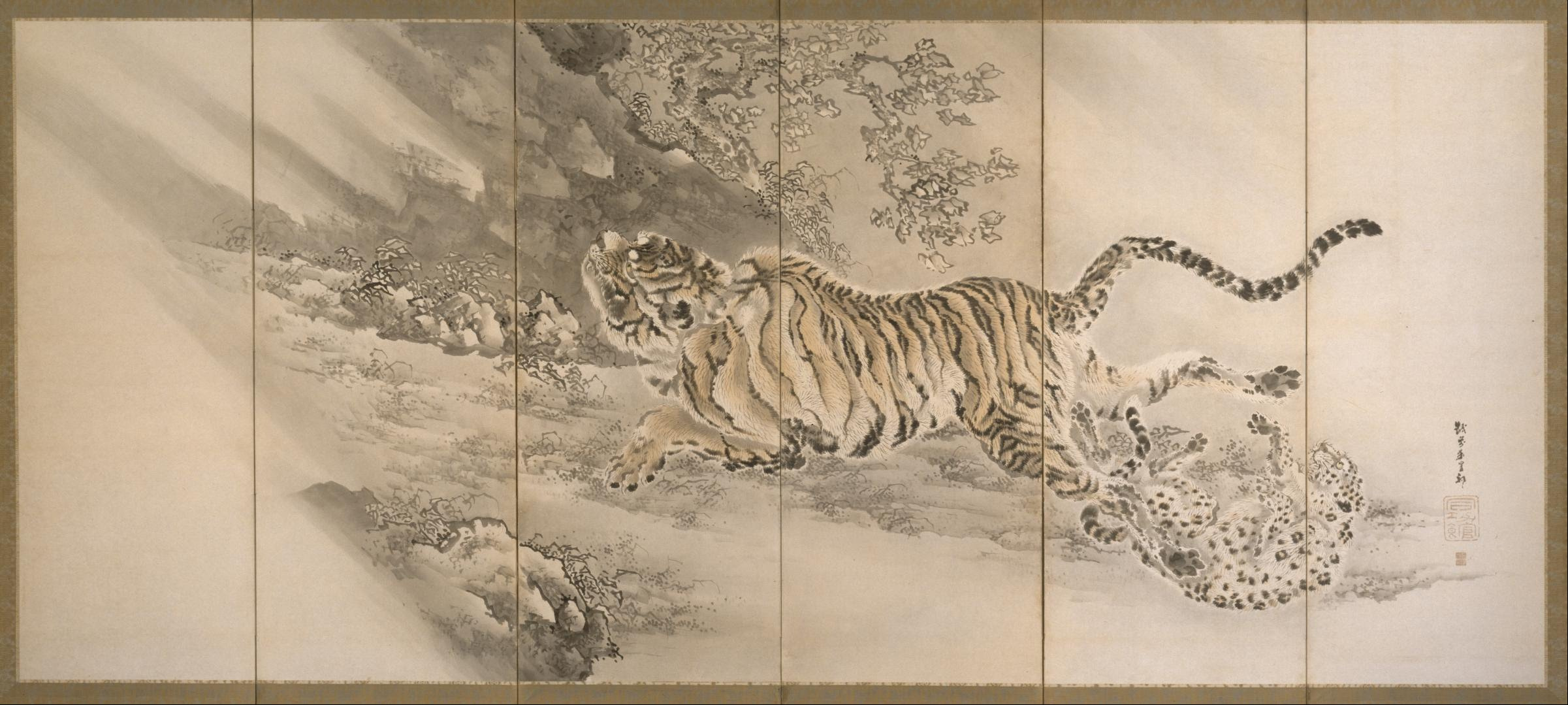
Kishi Ganku (Japan), Tiger in Landscape (1770–1839), ink and watercolor on paper, 171.2 × 372.1 × 1.5 cm

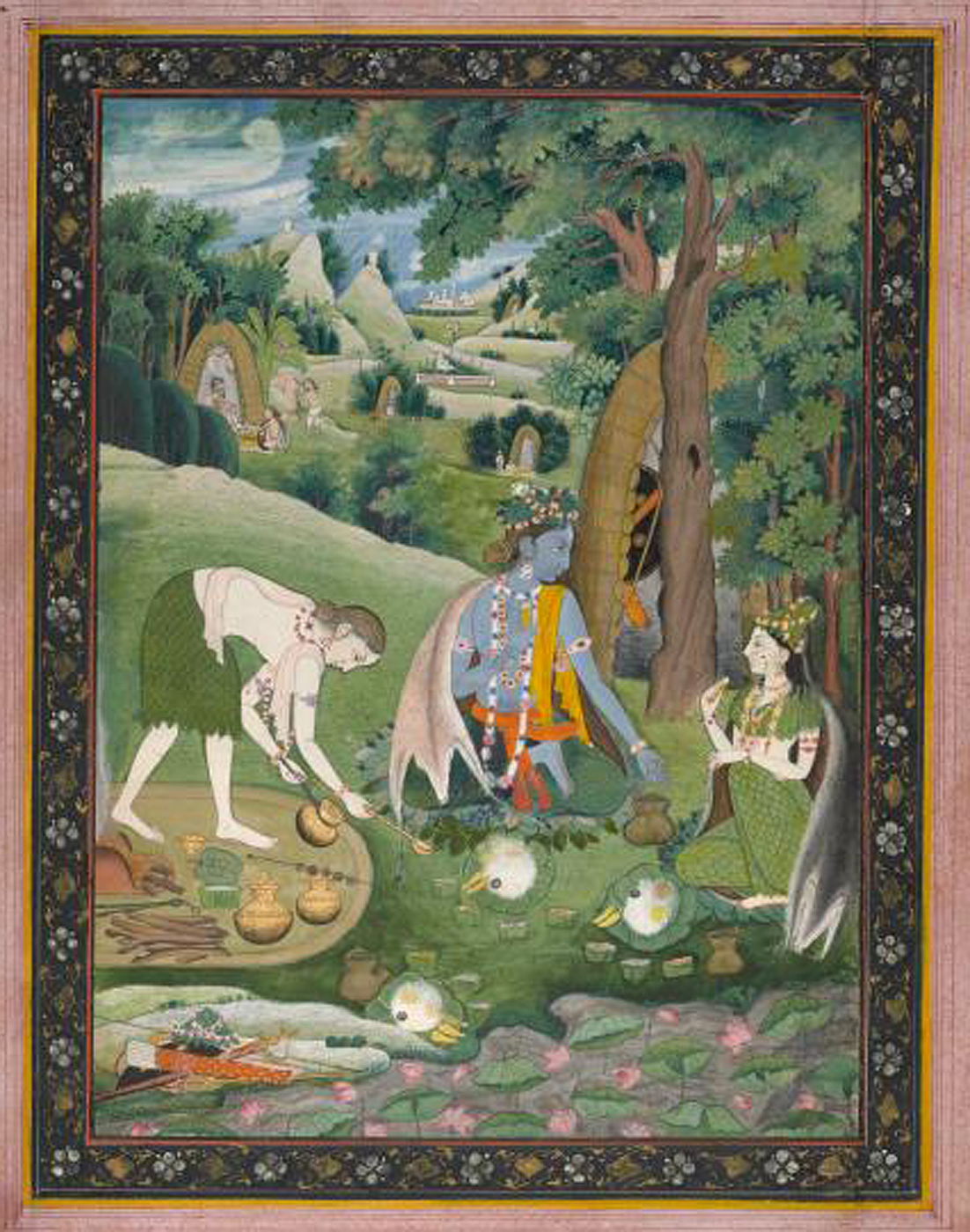
Indian, Rama, Lakshmana, and Sita Cooking and Eating in the Wilderness (c. 1820), gouache and gold on paper, 21.6 × 16.5 cm

Antiquities

European and American painting (1400–1899) [all oil on canvas except: ** = tempera & gold leaf on panel; * = oil on panel]

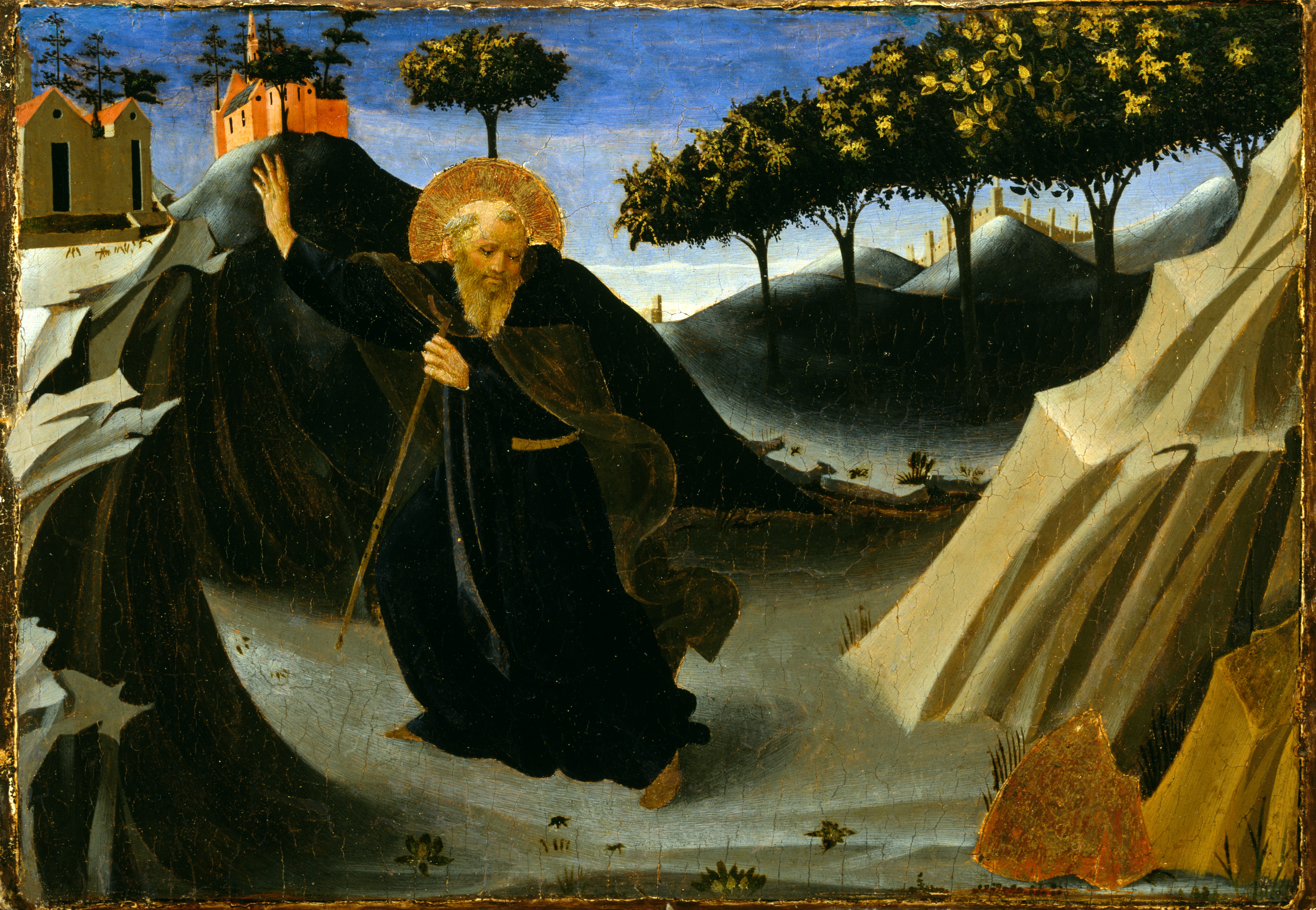
Fra Angelico, Saint Anthony Abbot Shunning the Mass of Gold ** (c. 1435–1440), 19.7 x 28.1 cm

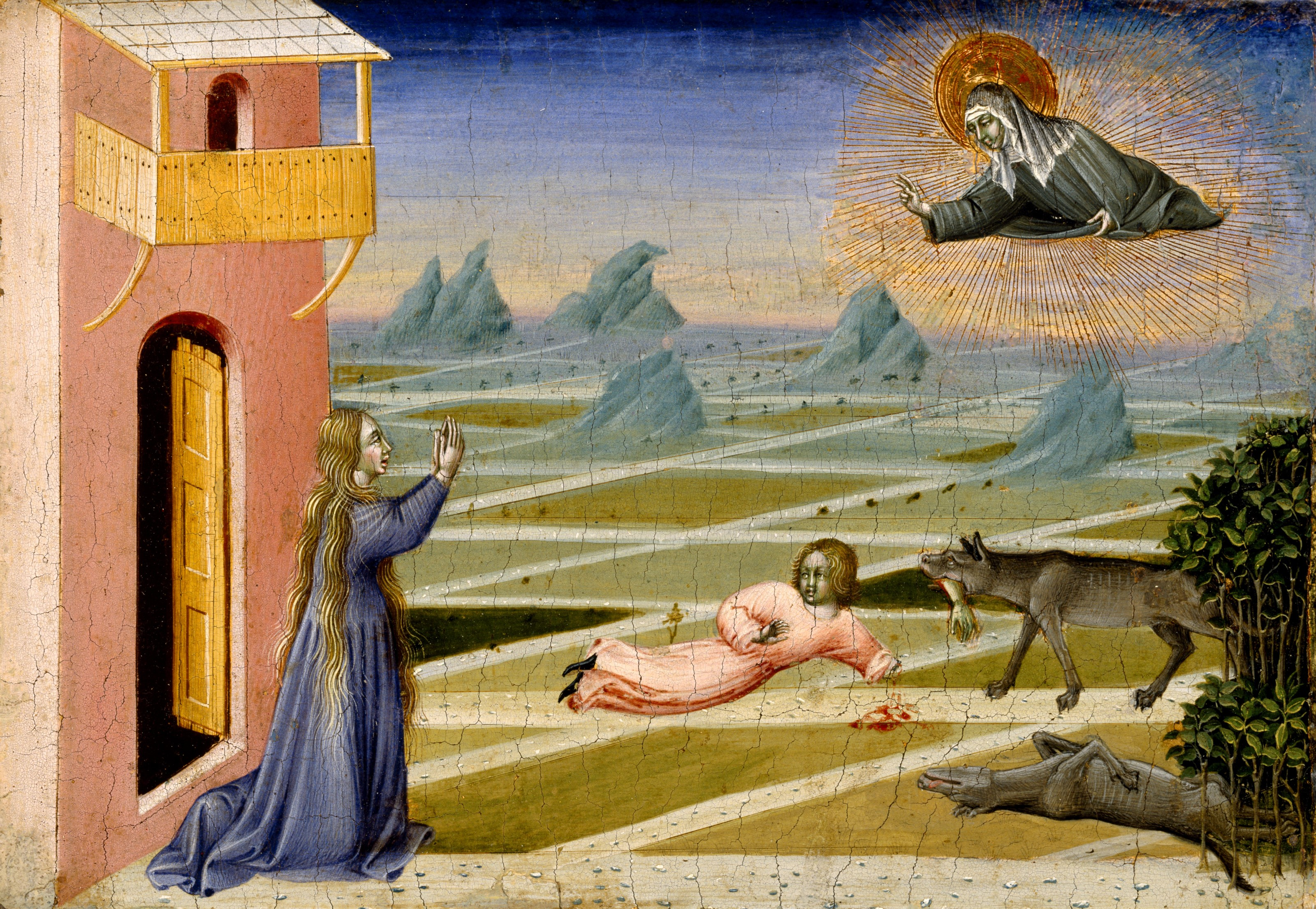
Giovanni di Paolo, Saint Clare Rescuing a Child Mauled by a Wolf ** (c. 1453–1462), 20.6 x 28.1 cm

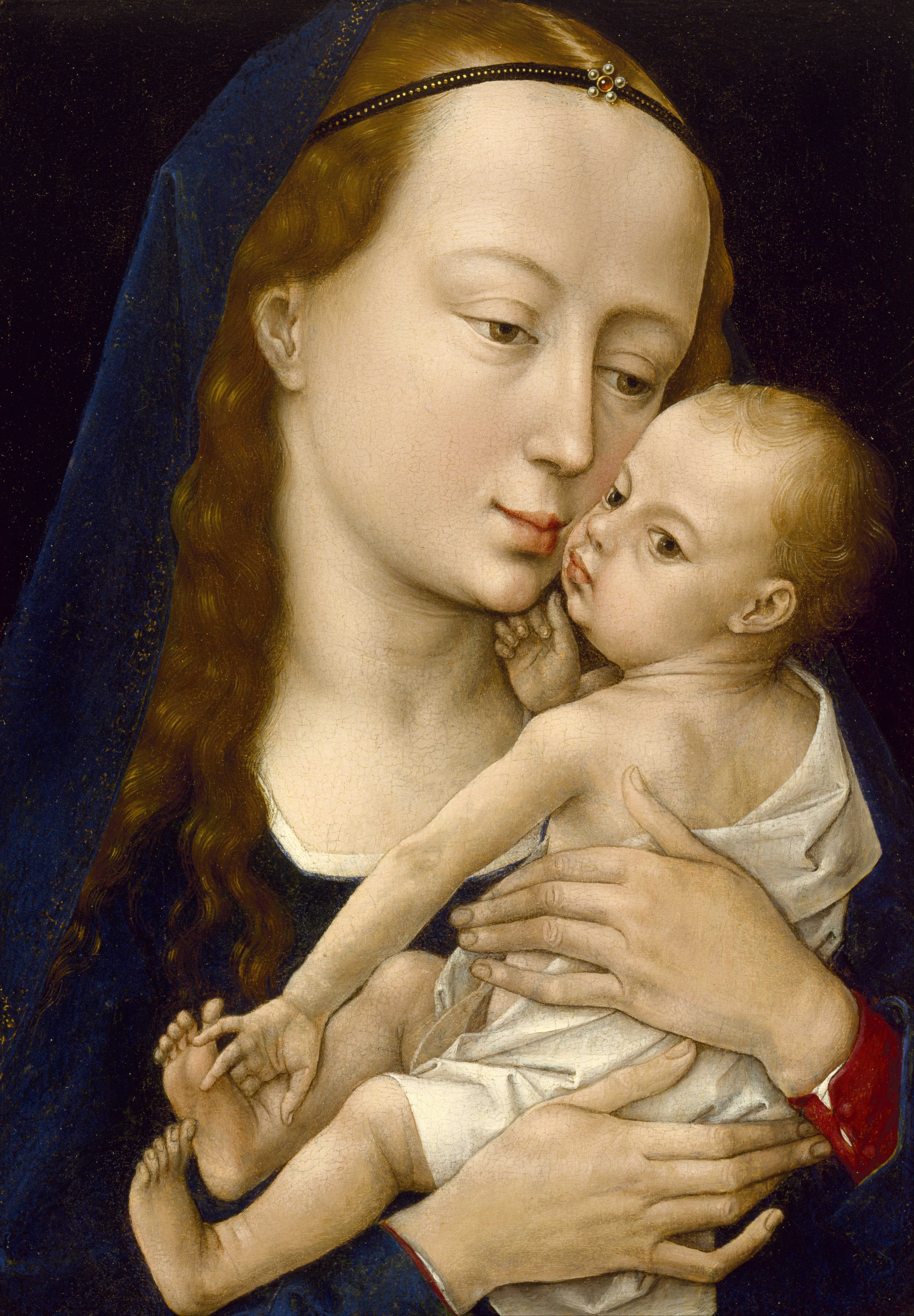
Rogier van der Weyden, Virgin and Child * (after 1454), 31.9 x 22.86 cm

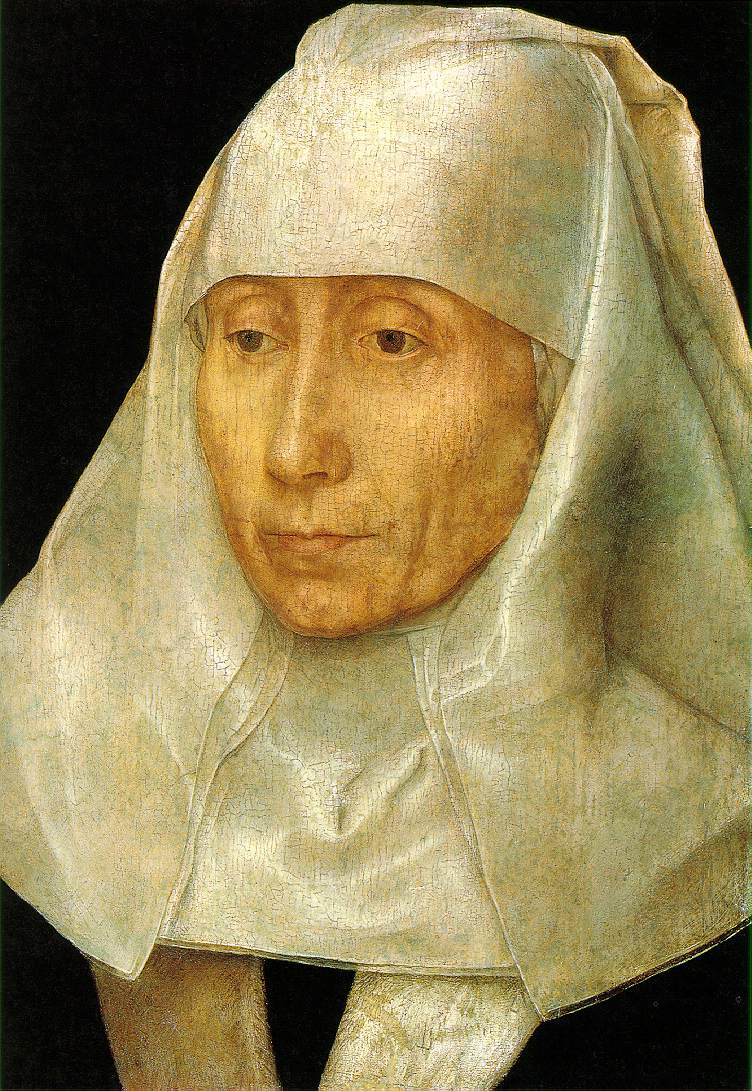
Hans Memling, Portrait of an Old Woman * (c. 1468–1470), 25.6 x 17.7 cm

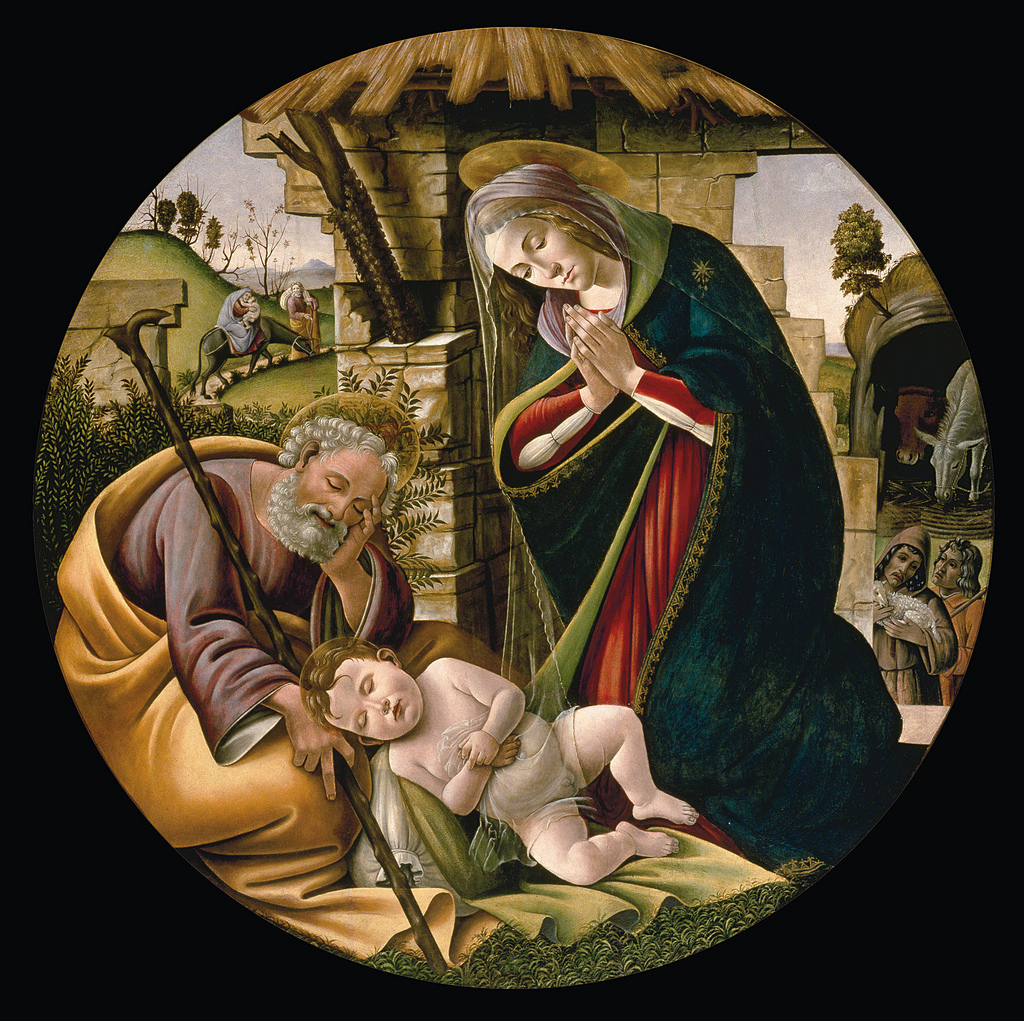
Alessandro Botticelli, The Adoration of the Christ Child * (c. 1500), 120.7 cm diameter

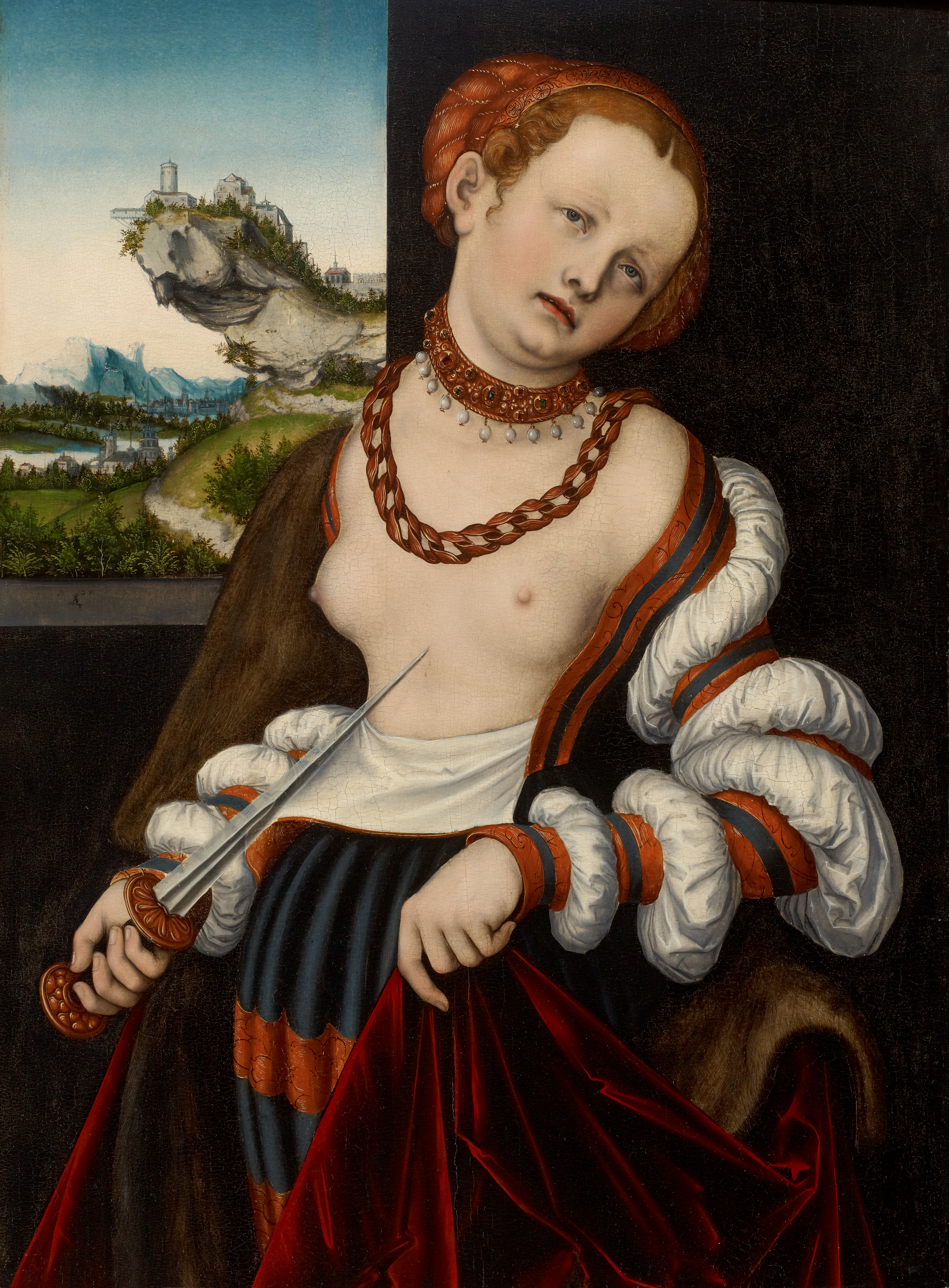
Lucas Cranach the Elder, The Suicide of Lucretia * (1529), 74.9 x 53.9 cm

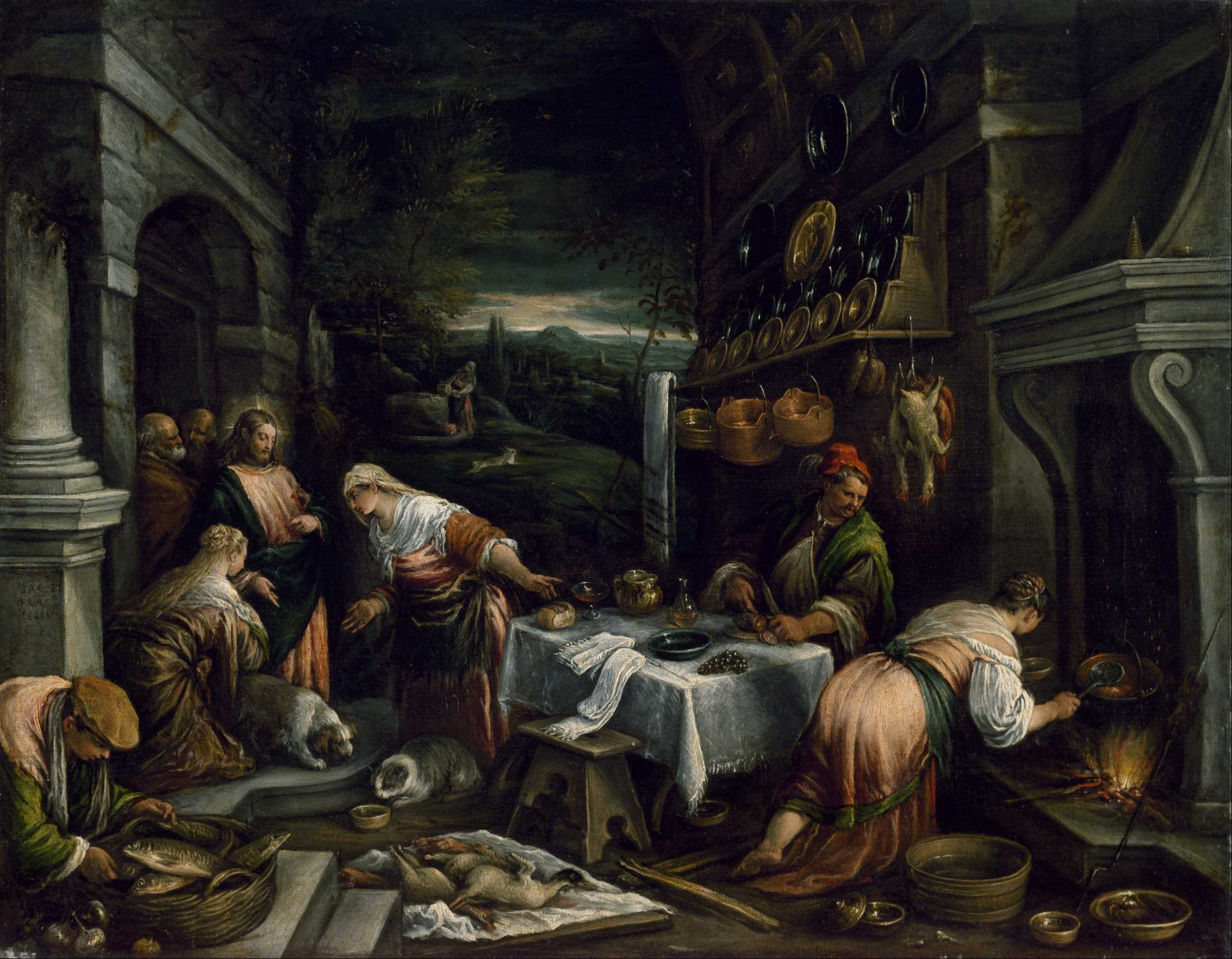
Jacopo Bassano, Christ in the House of Mary, Martha, and Lazarus (c. 1577), 98.4 × 126.4 cm

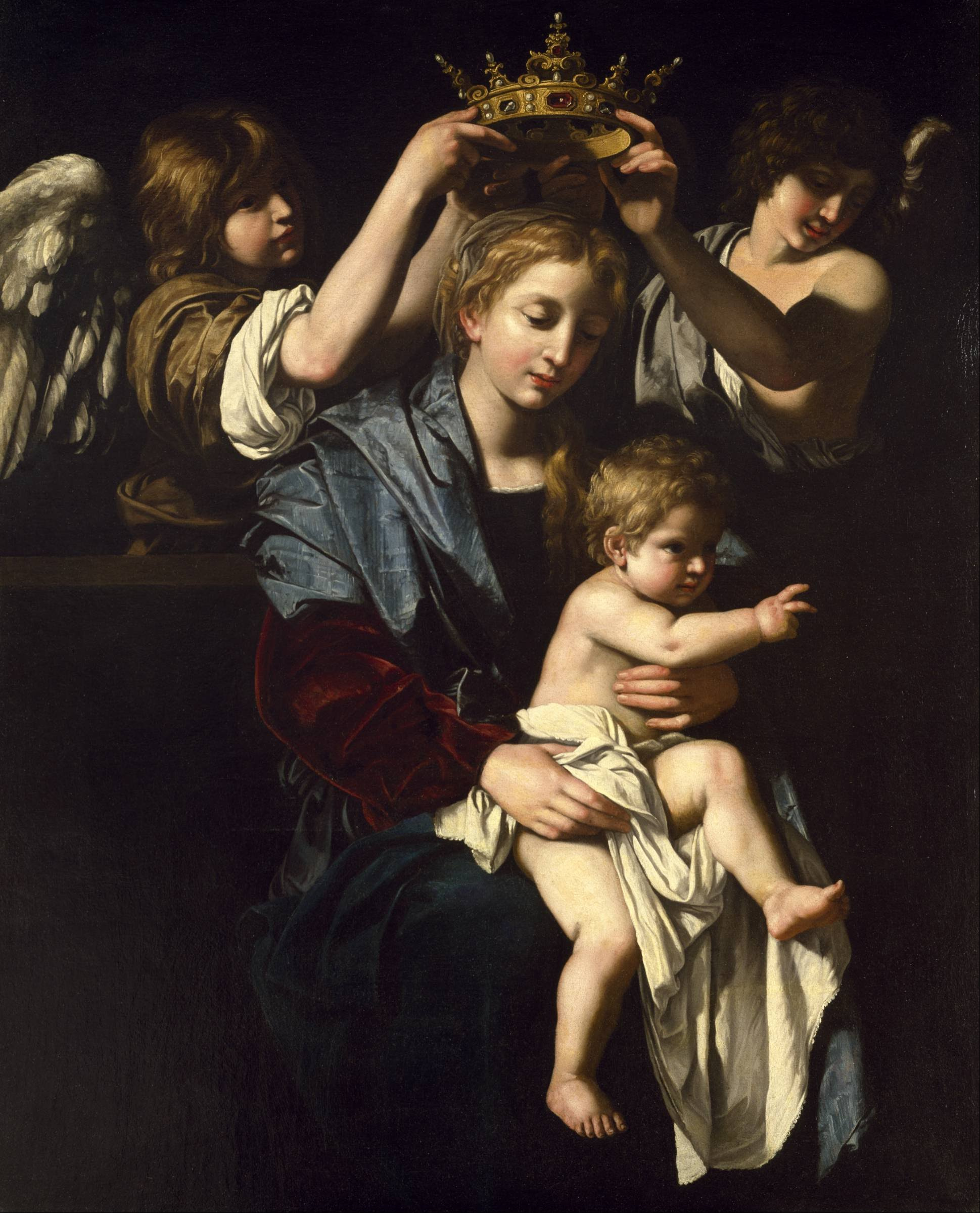
Bartolomeo Cavarozzi, Virgin and Child with Angels (c. 1620), 155.3 × 125.1 cm

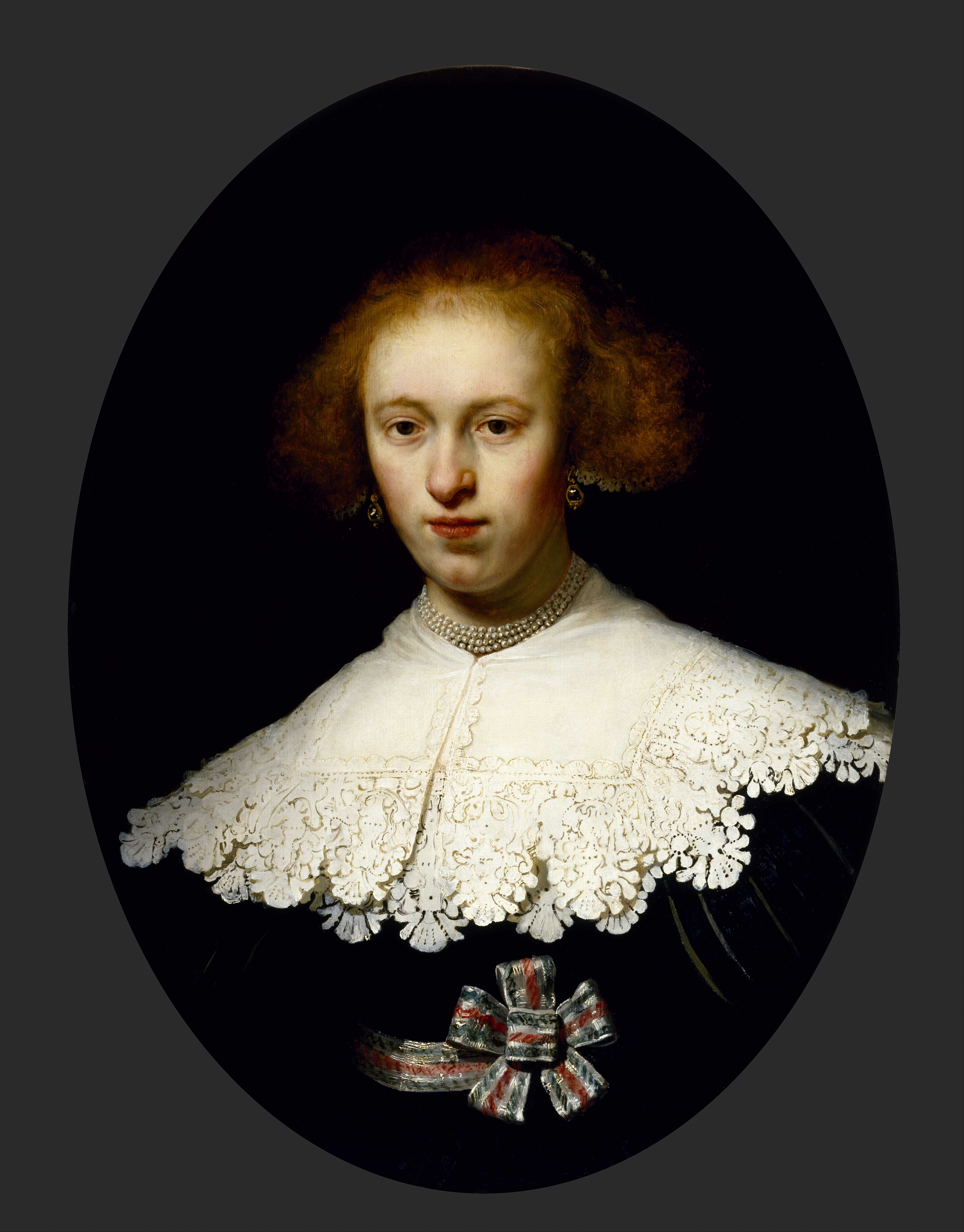
Rembrandt van Rijn, Portrait of a Young Woman * (1633), 65.2 x 48.7 cm

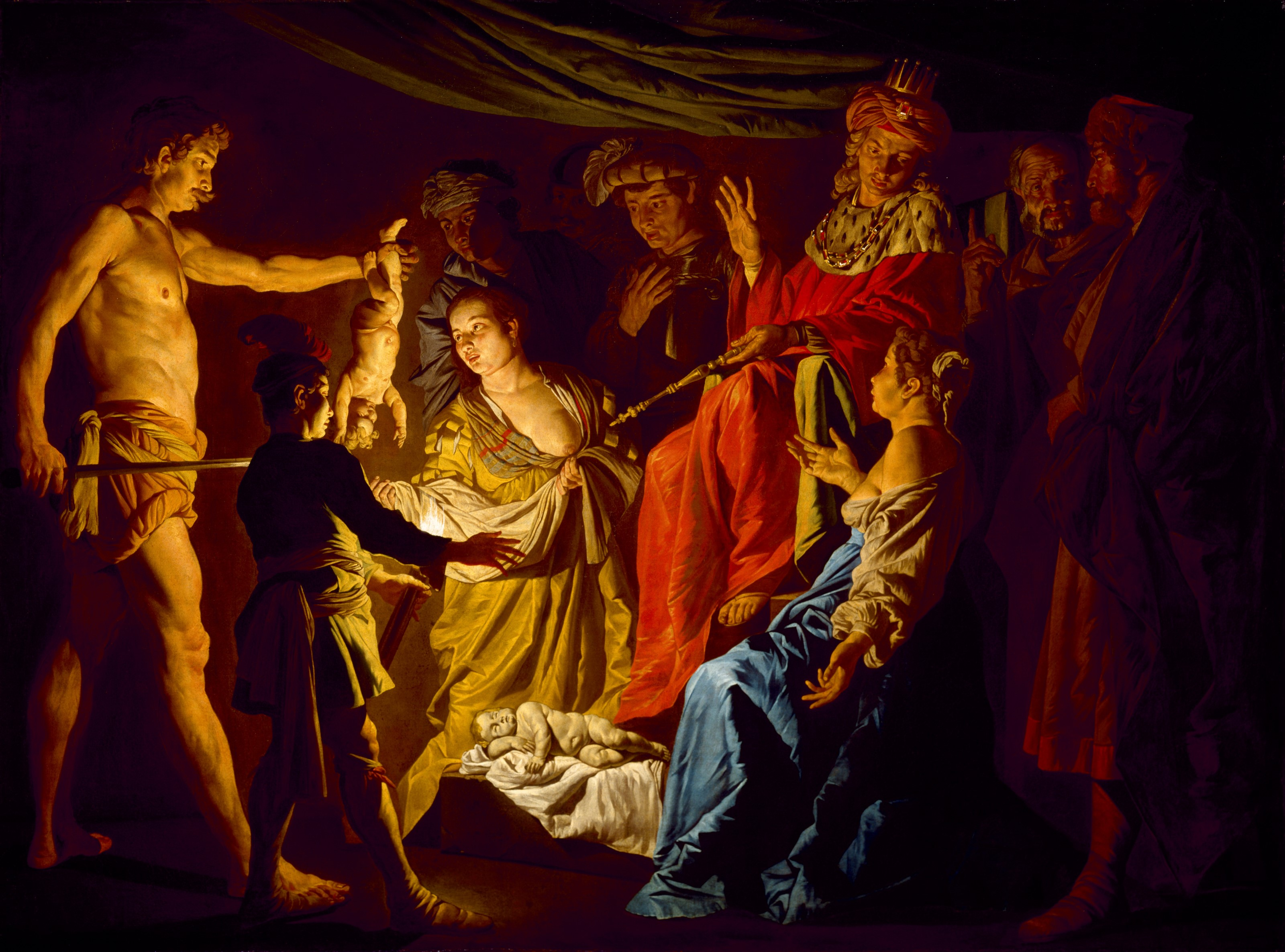
Matthias Stom, The Judgement of Solomon, (c. 1640), 152.5 × 204.9 cm

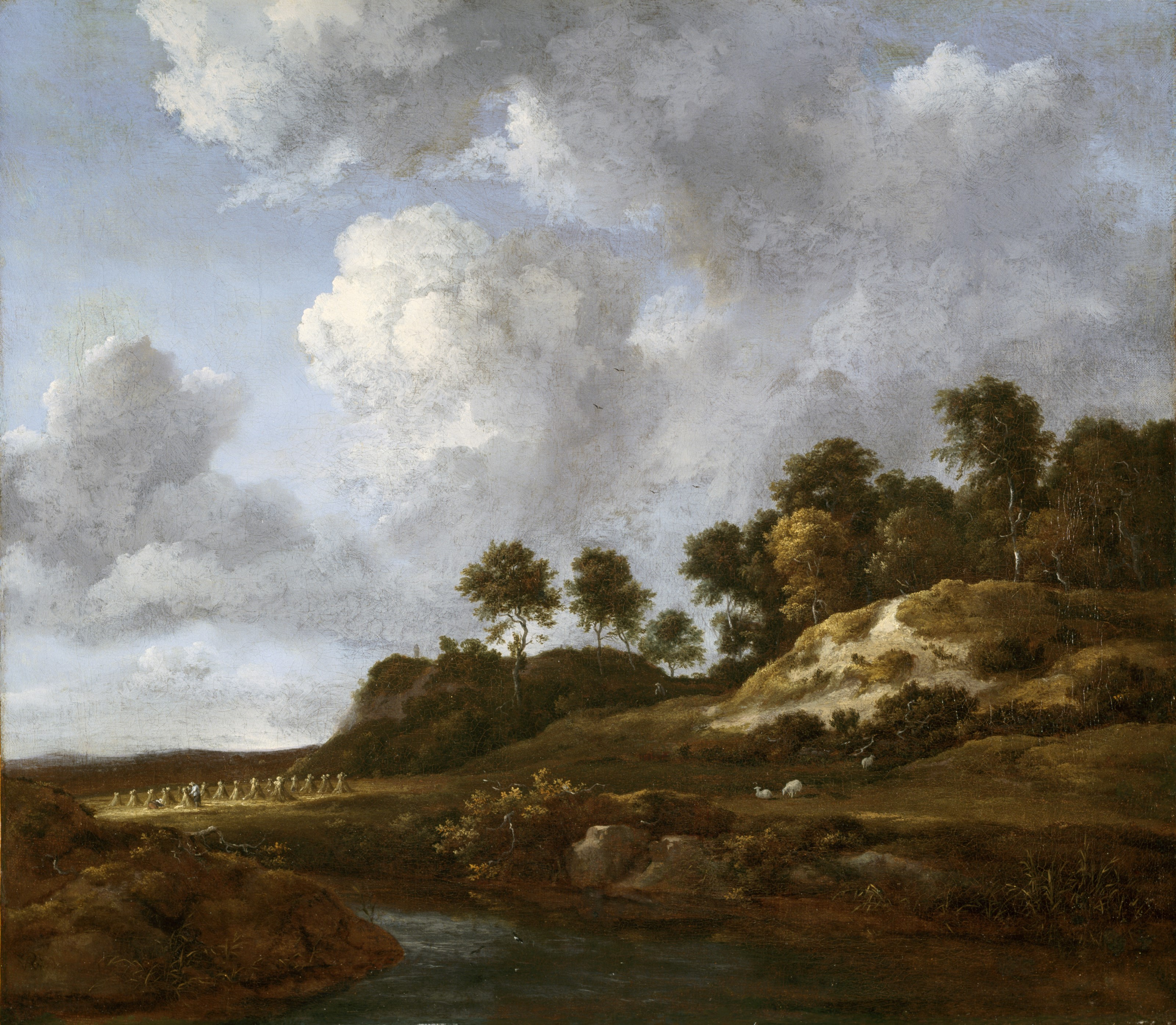
Jacob van Ruisdael, Landscape with Cornfields (c. 1670s), 55.2 x 62.8 cm

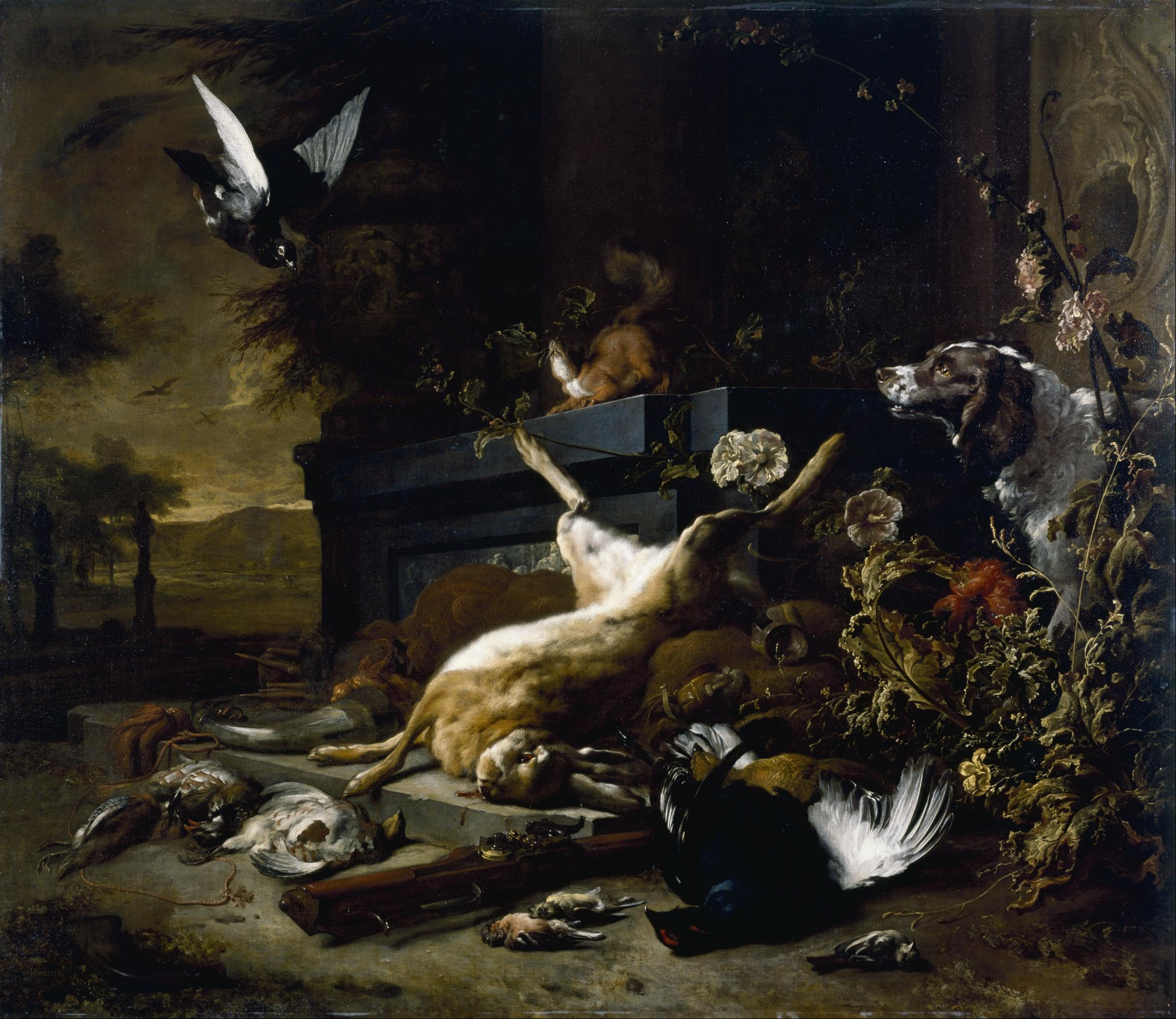
Jan Weenix, Still Life of Game including a Hare, Black Grouse, Partridge, Spaniel, and Pigeon in Flight (c. 1680), 157.2 × 182.2 cm

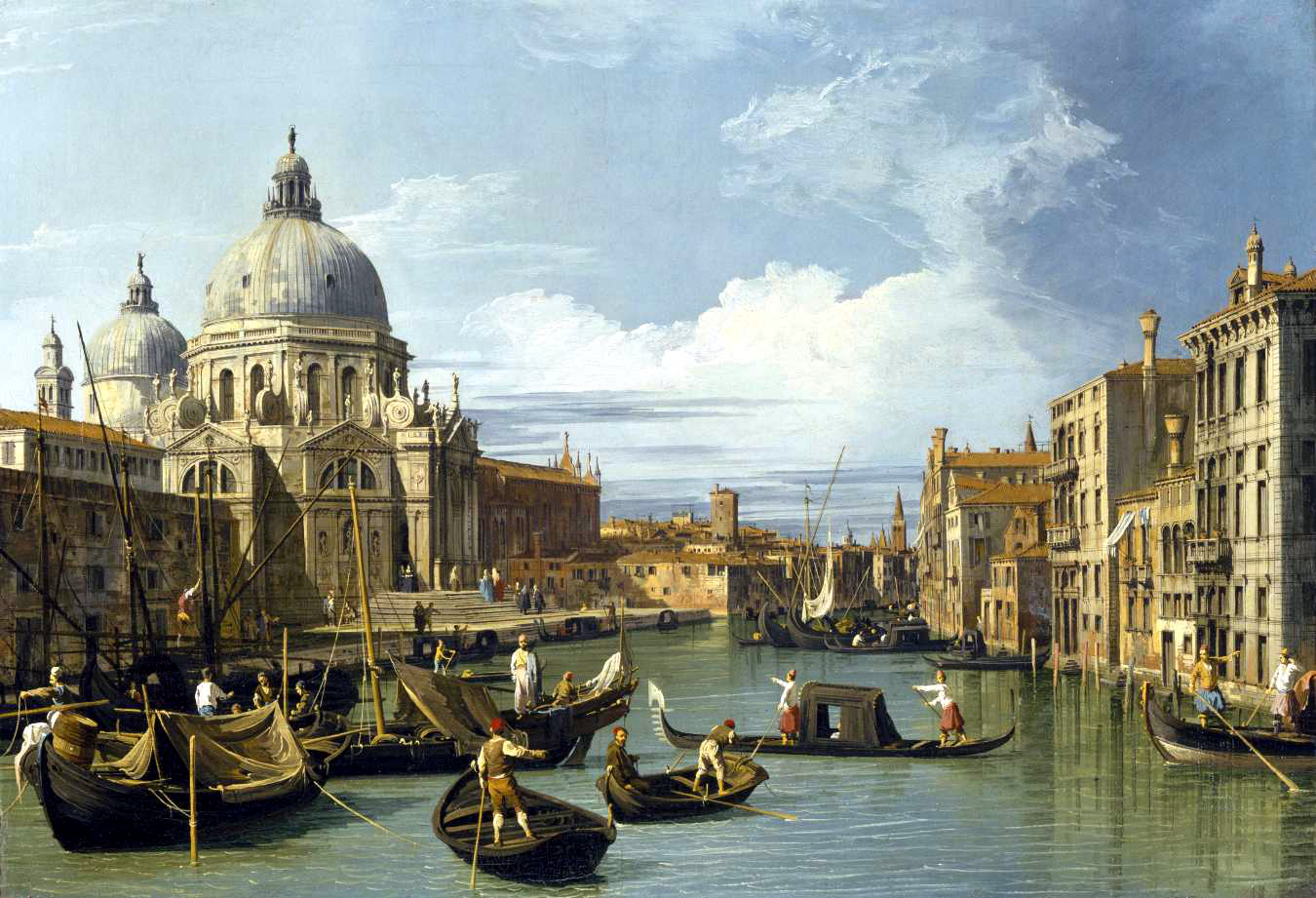
Canaletto, Entrance to the Grand Canal, Venice (c. 1730), 49.5 × 73.7 cm

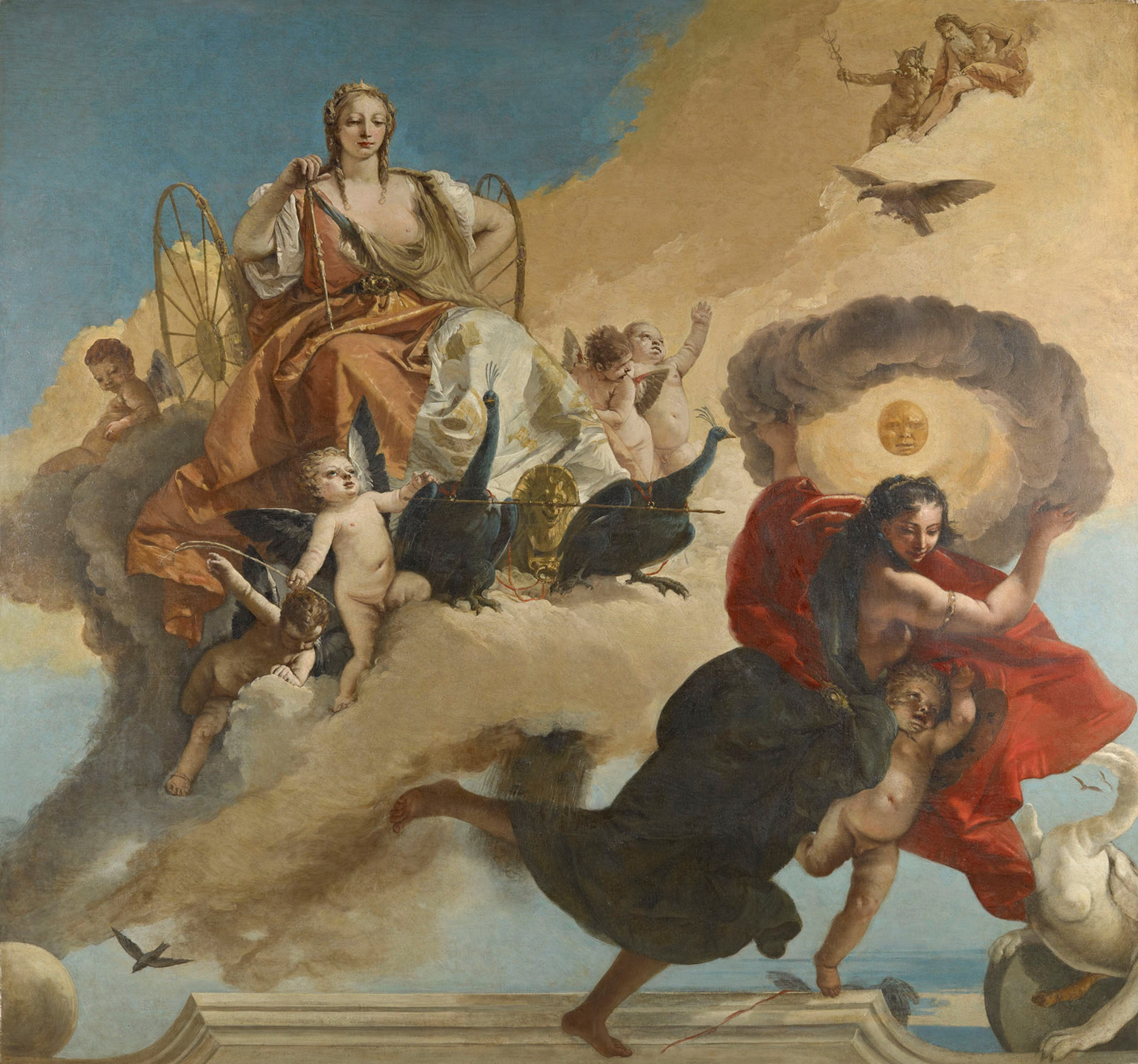
Giovanni Battista Tiepolo, Juno and Luna (1735–1745) 213 x 231.1 cm

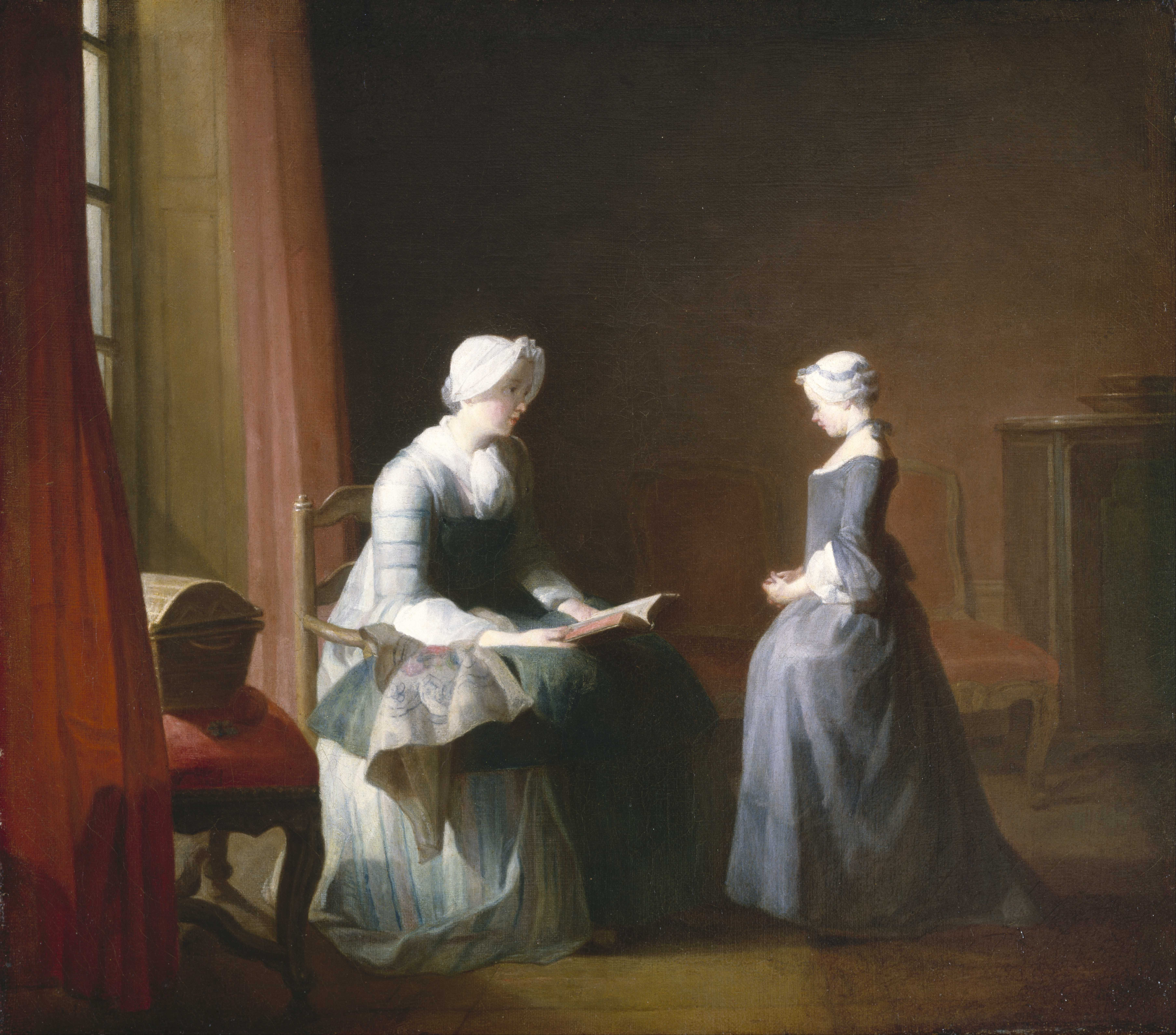
Jean-Baptiste-Siméon Chardin, The Good Education (c. 1753), 41.4 × 47.3 cm

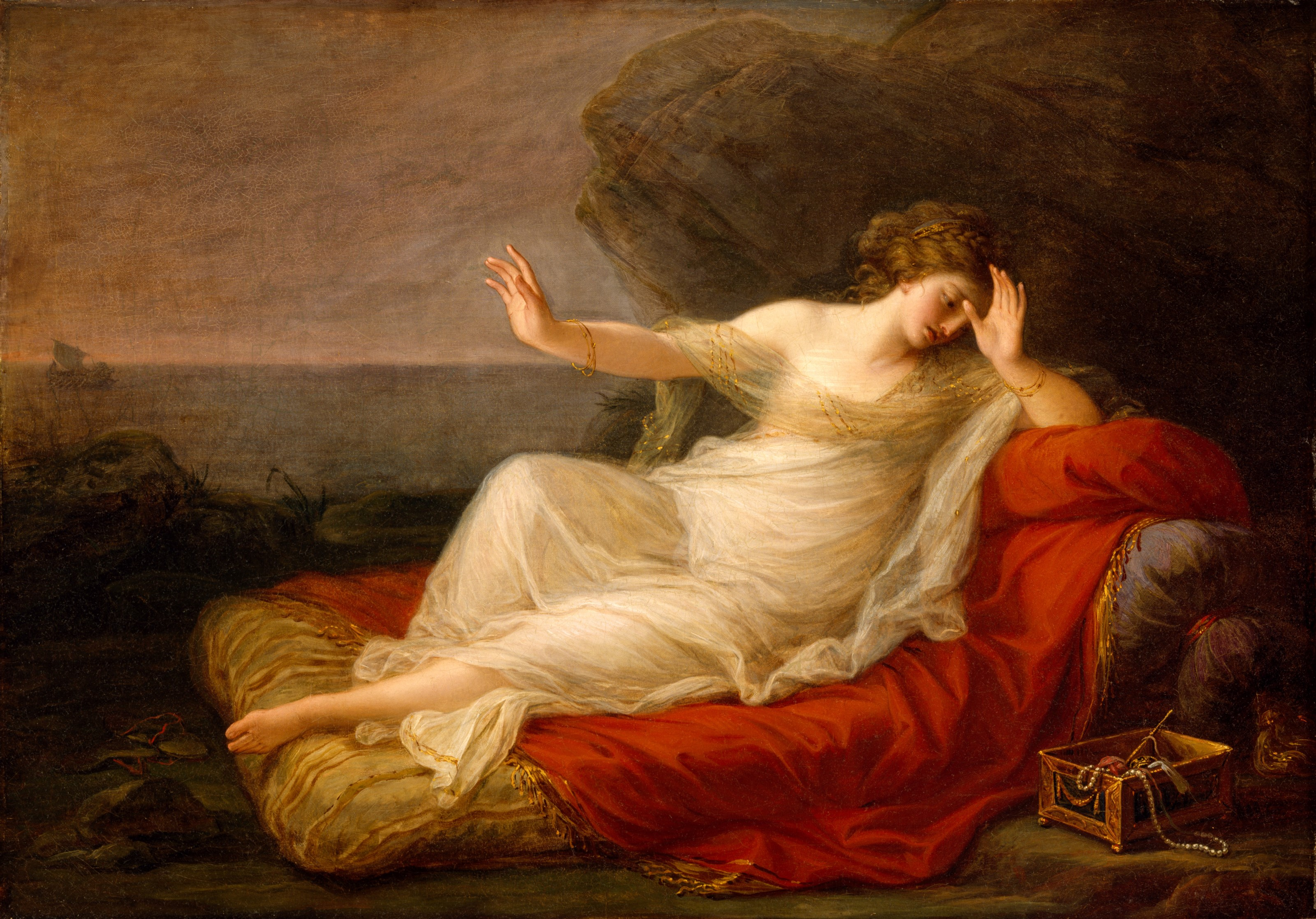
Angelica Kauffmann, Ariadne Abandoned by Theseus (1774), 63.8 x 90.9 cm

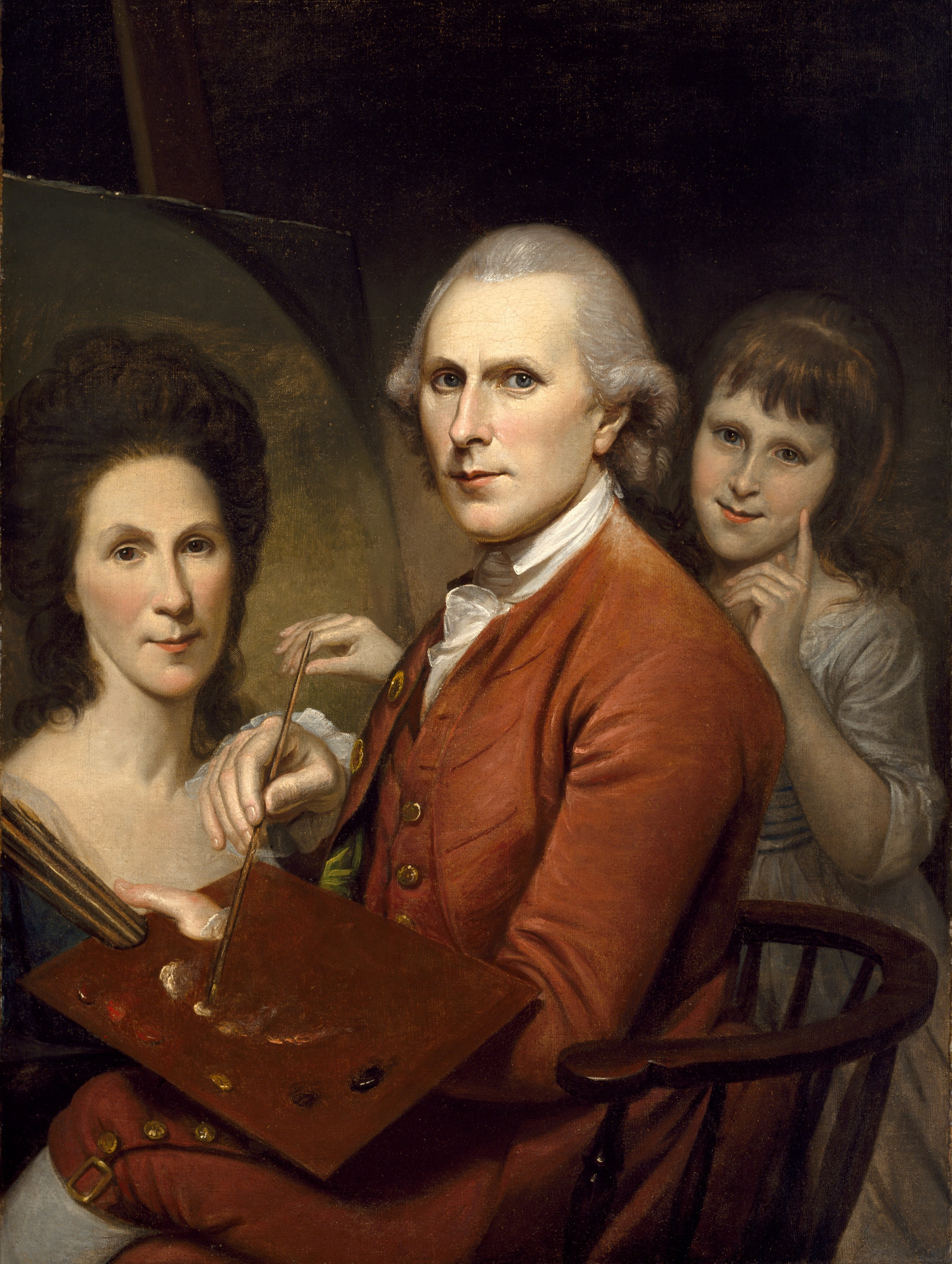
Charles Willson Peale, Self-Portrait with Angelica and Rachel (1782–1785), 91.8 × 68.9 cm

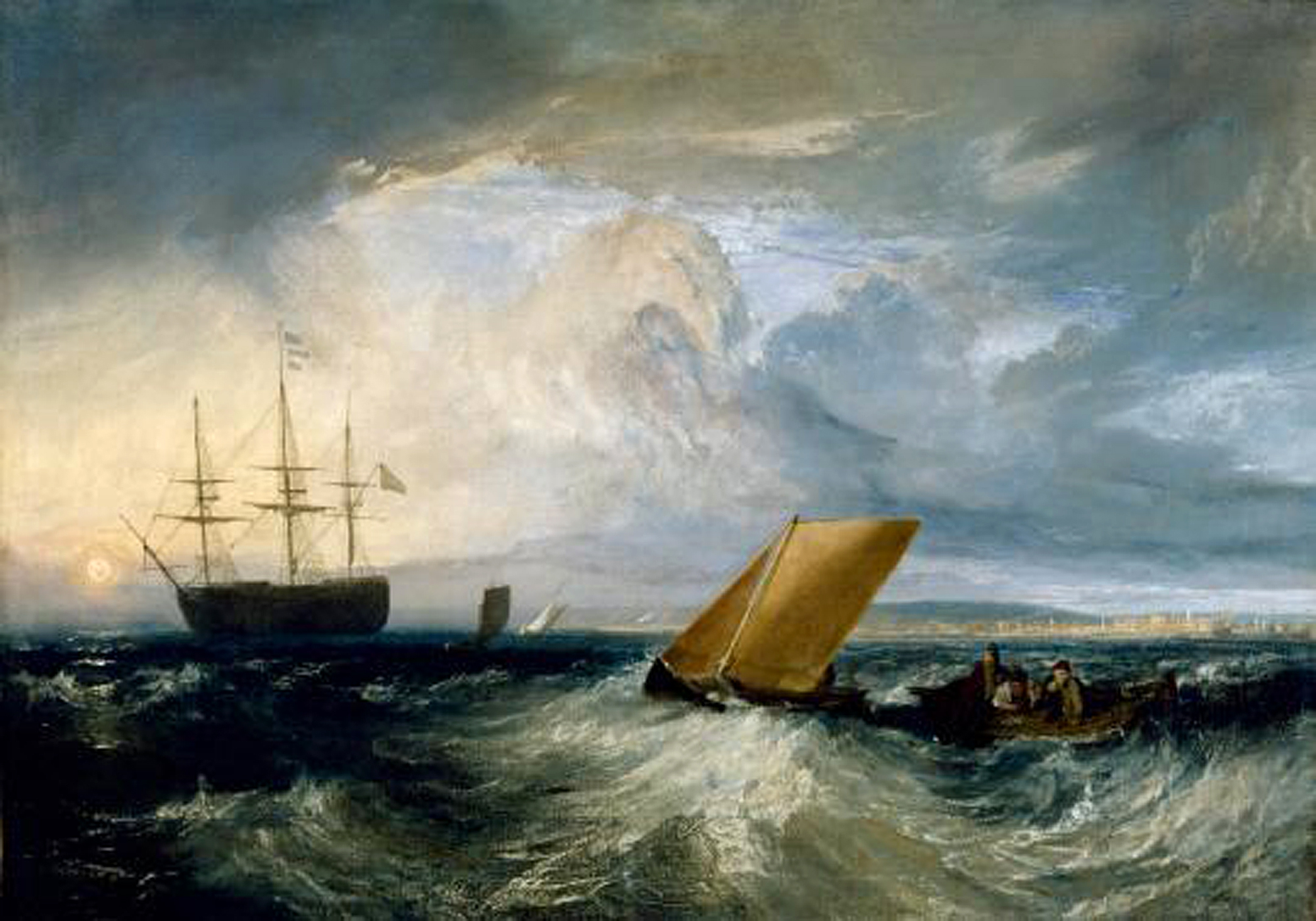
Joseph Mallord William Turner, Sheerness as Seen From the Nore (1808), 104.5 × 149.6 cm

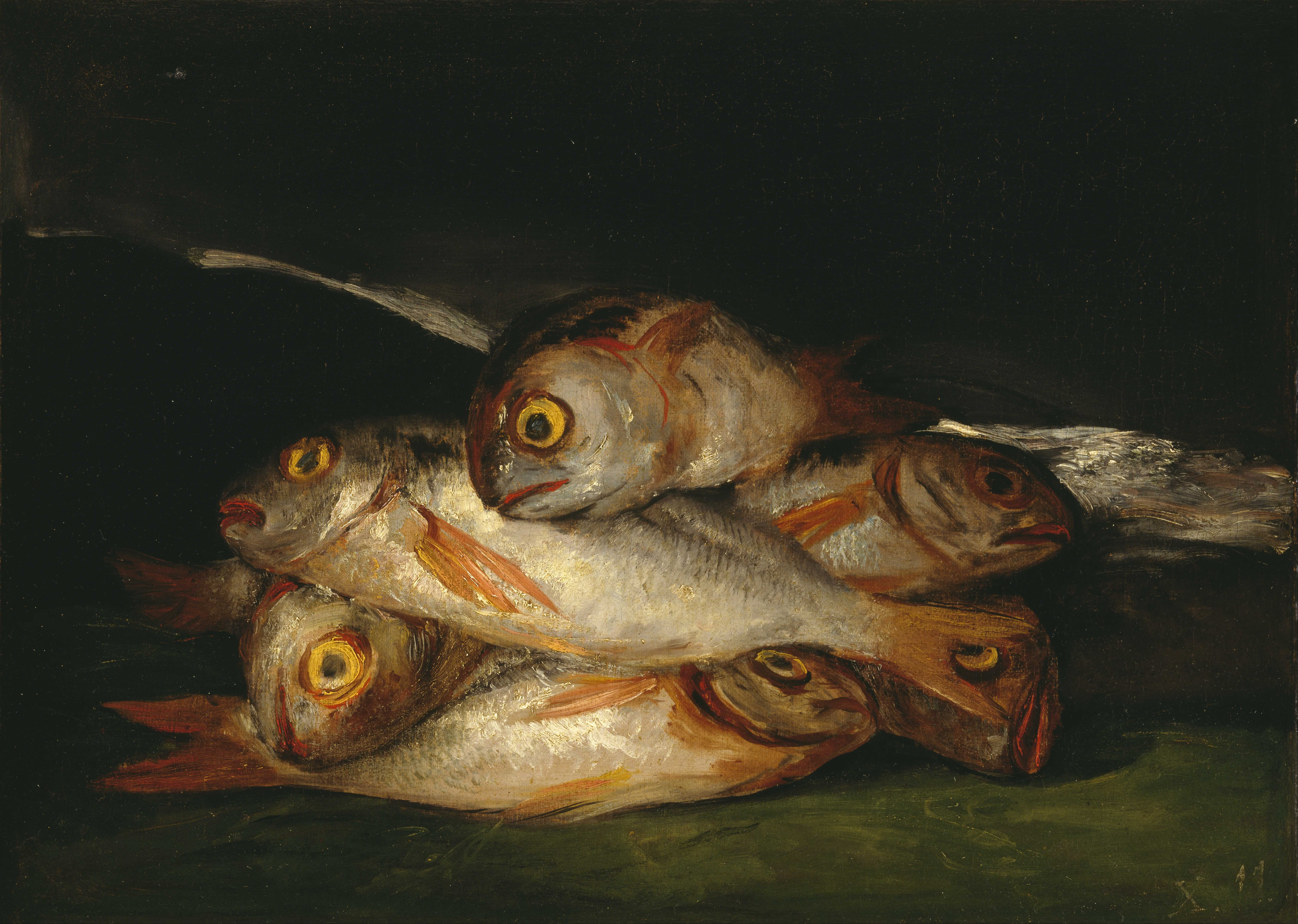
Francisco José de Goya y Lucientes, Still Life with Golden Bream (1808–1812), 44.7 x 62.5 cm

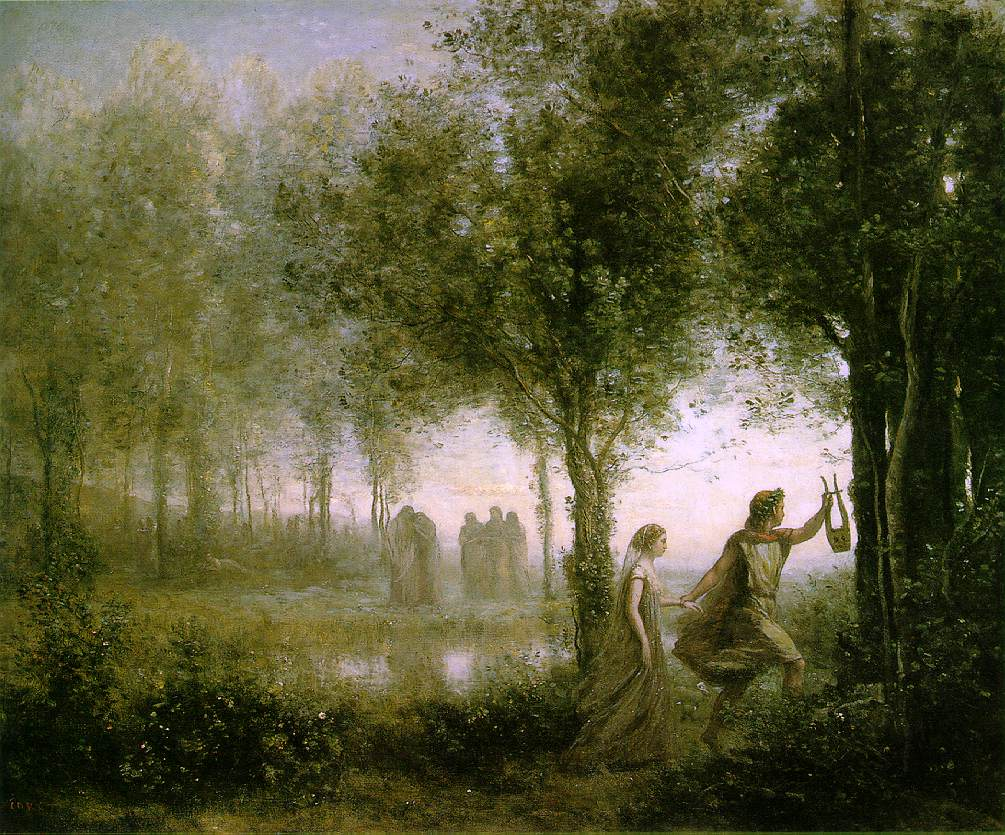
Jean-Baptiste-Camille Corot, Orpheus Leading Eurydice from the Underworld (1861), 112.3 x 137.1 cm

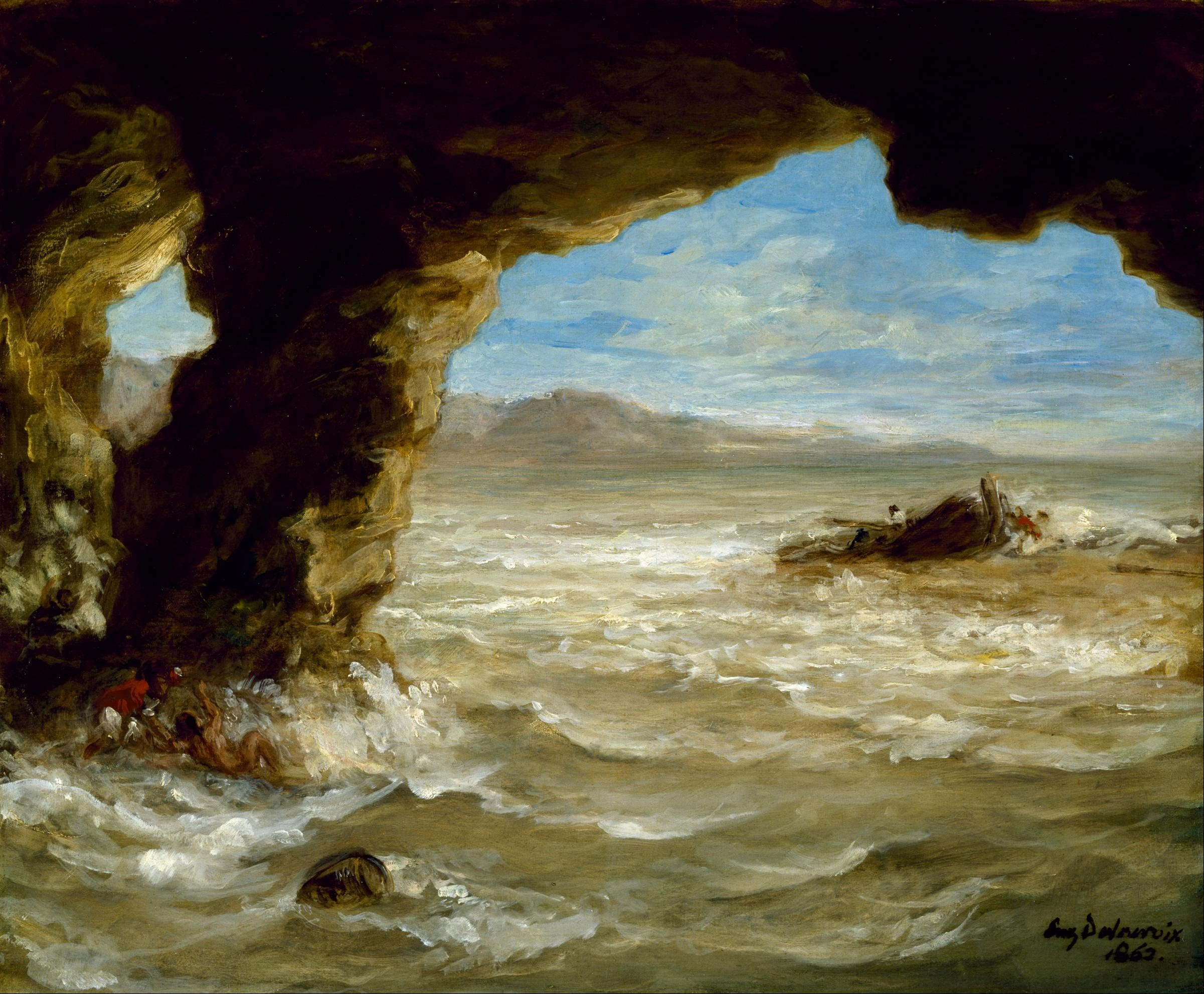
Eugène Delacroix, Shipwreck on the Coast (1862)

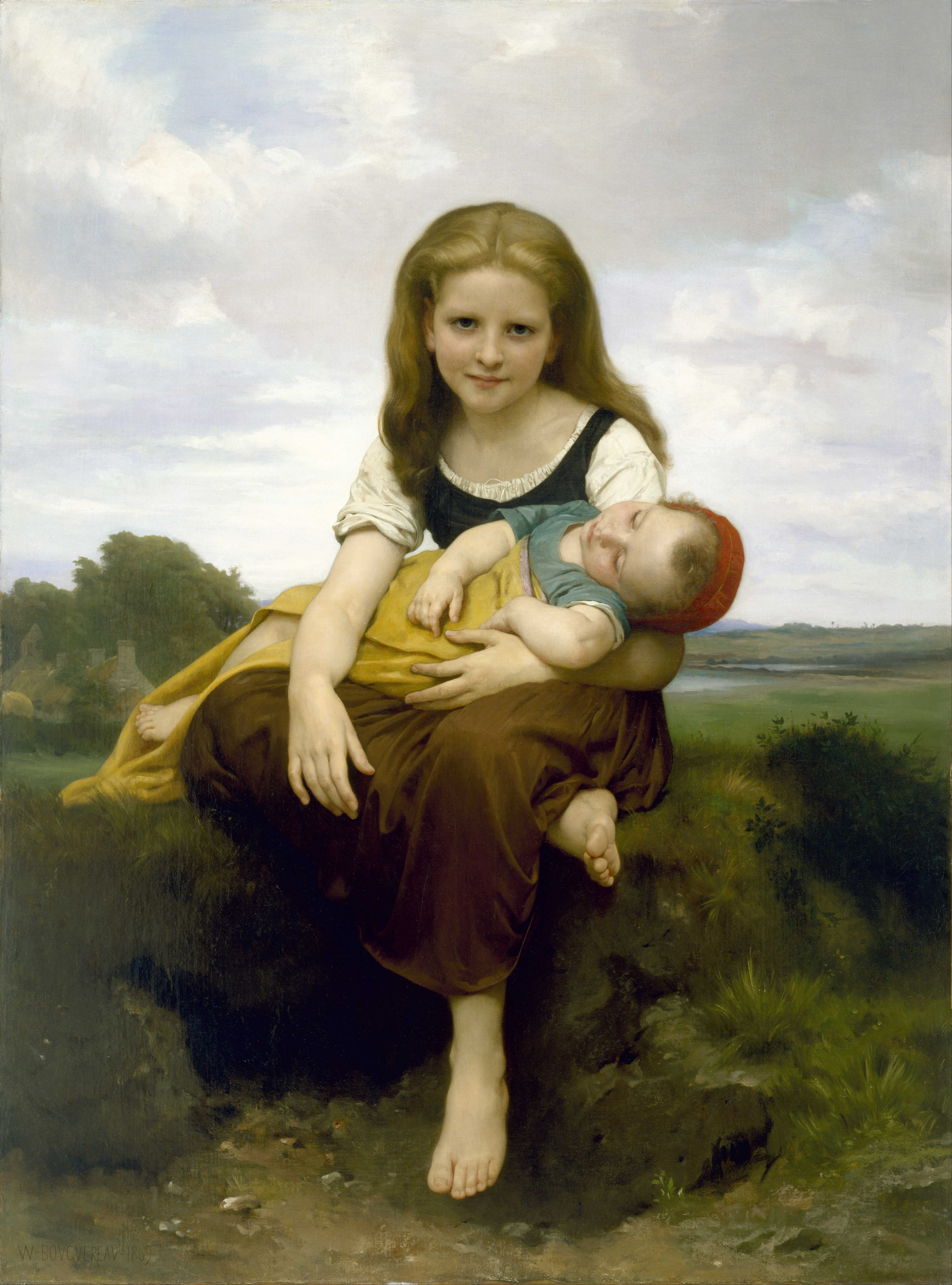
William-Adolphe Bouguereau, The Elder Sister (1869), 130.2 × 97.2 cm

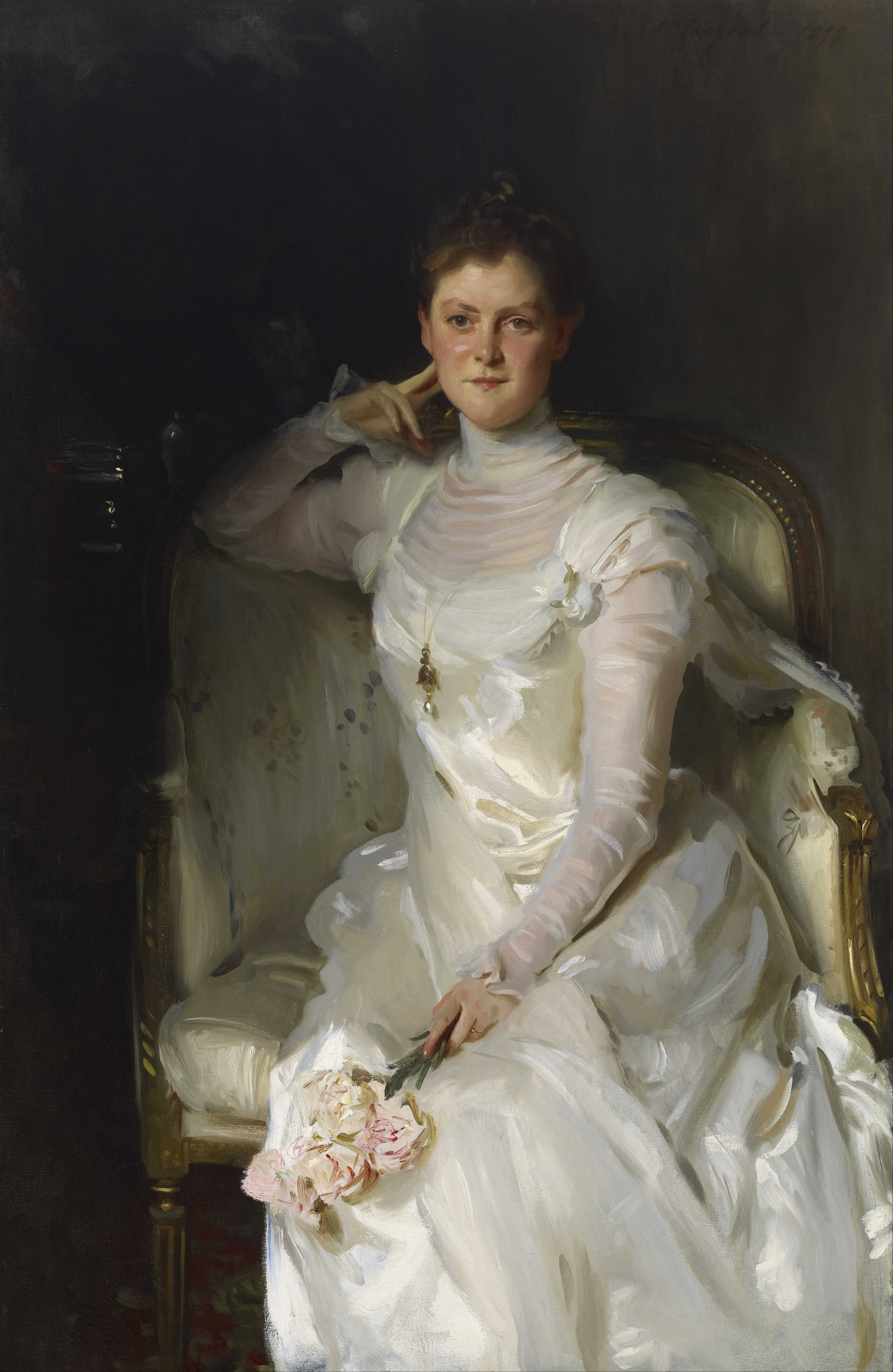
John Singer Sargent, Mrs. Sarah Montgomery Sears (1899), 147.6 x 96.8 cm

Impressionism, postimpressionism, and early modern art [all oil on canvas unless noted otherwise]

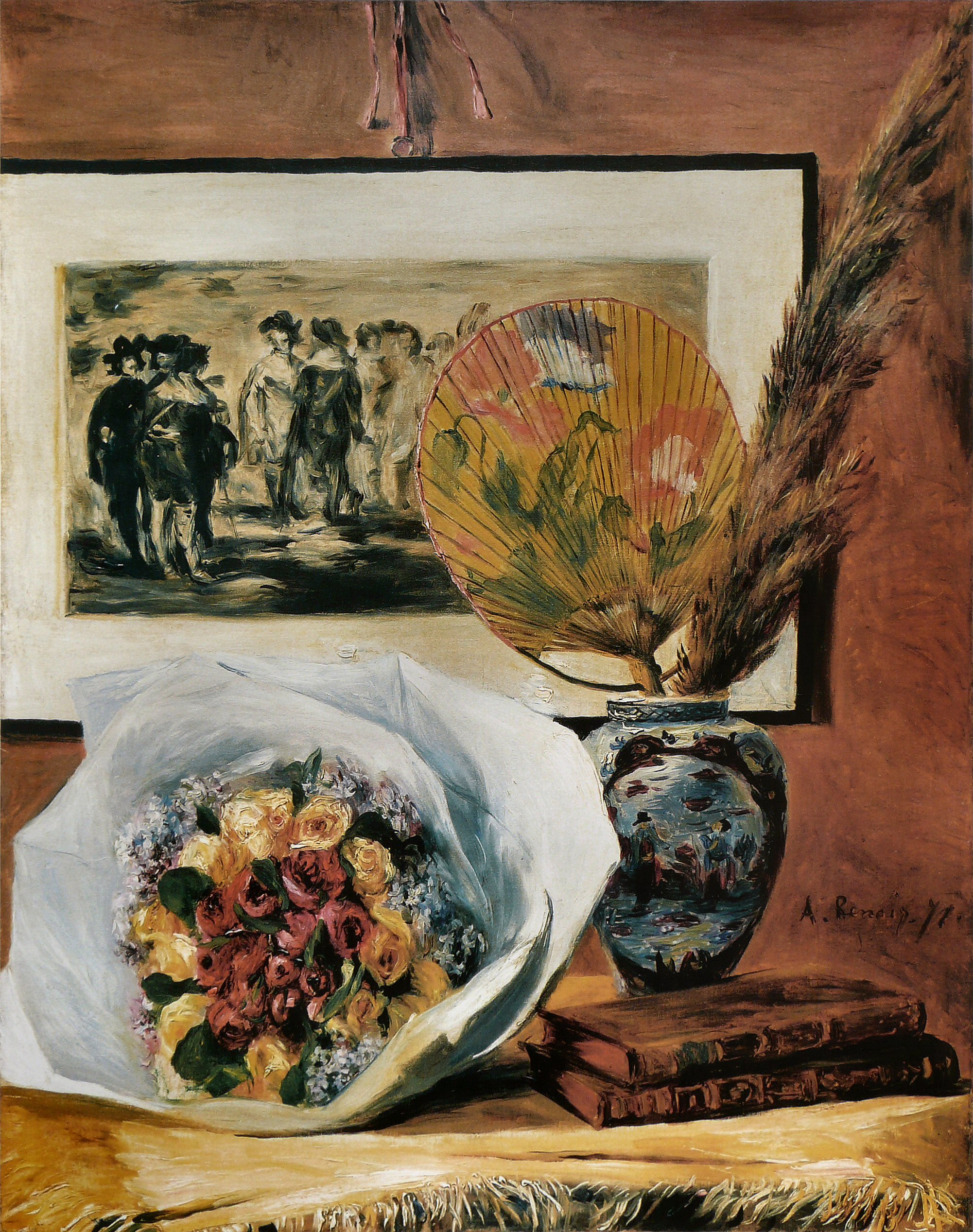
Pierre-Auguste Renoir, Nature morte au bouquet (1871), 73.7 × 59.1 cm

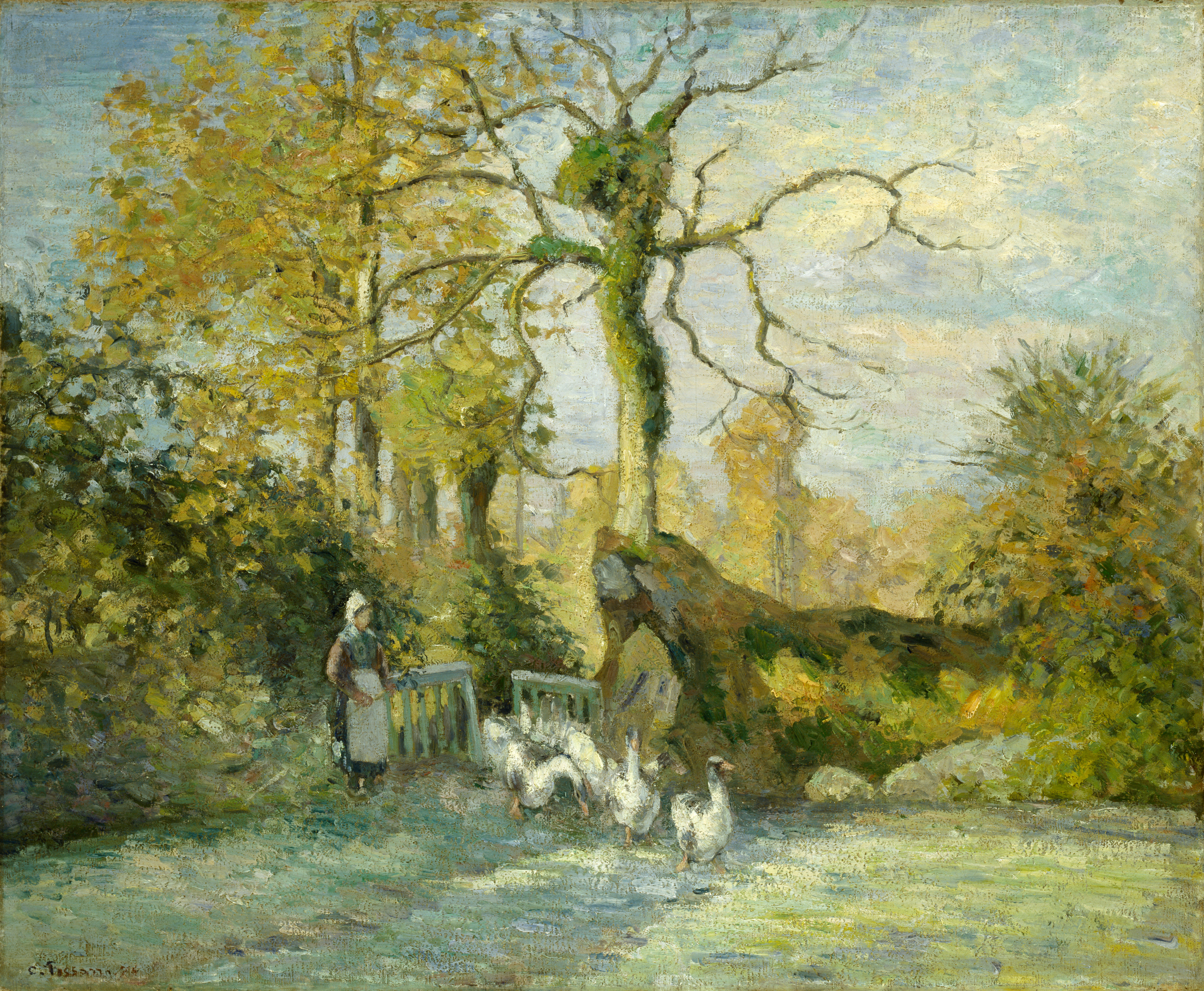
Camille Pissarro, The Goose Girl at Montfoucault (1876), 57.8 × 73 cm

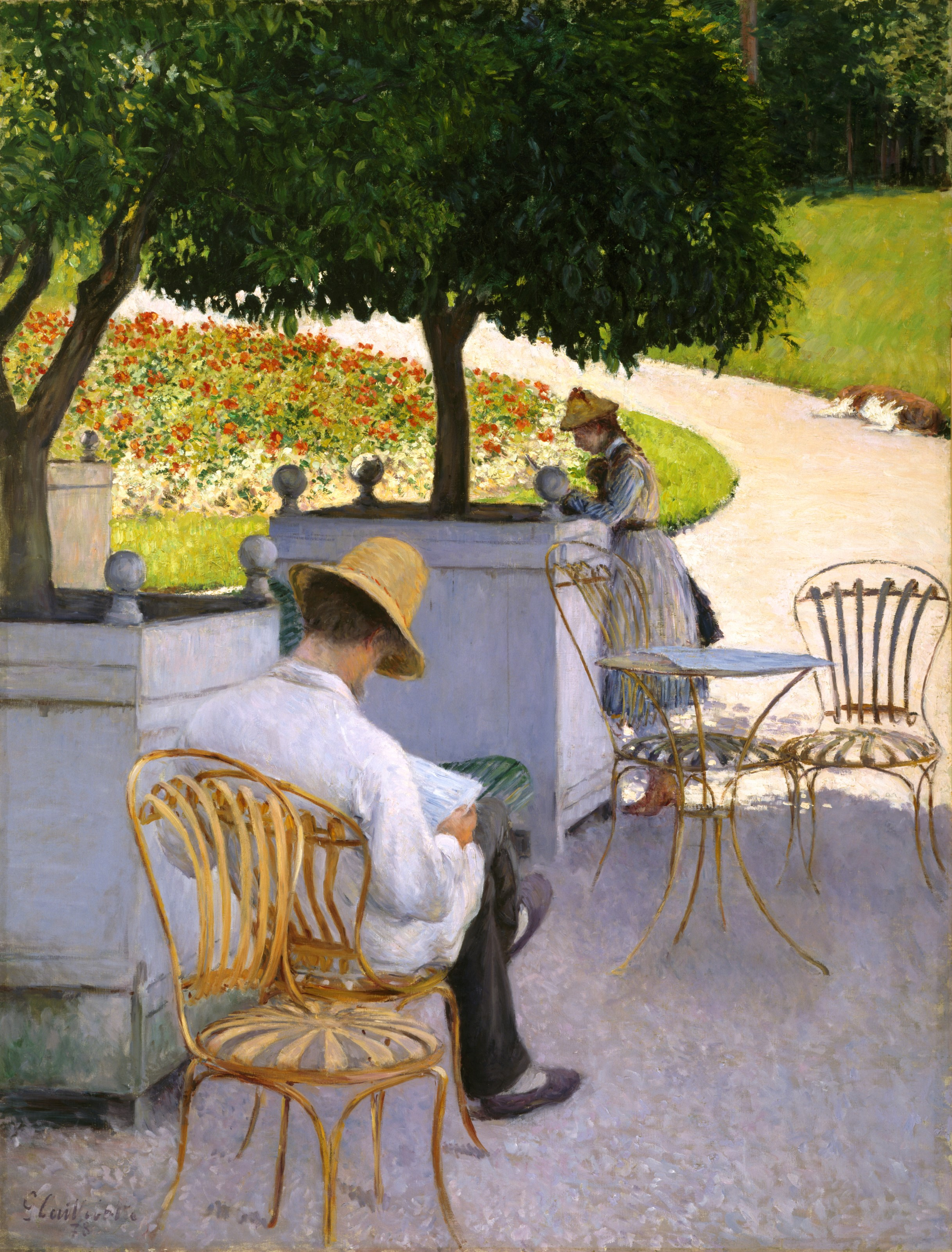
Gustave Caillebotte, Les Orangers (1878), 154.9 × 116.8 cm

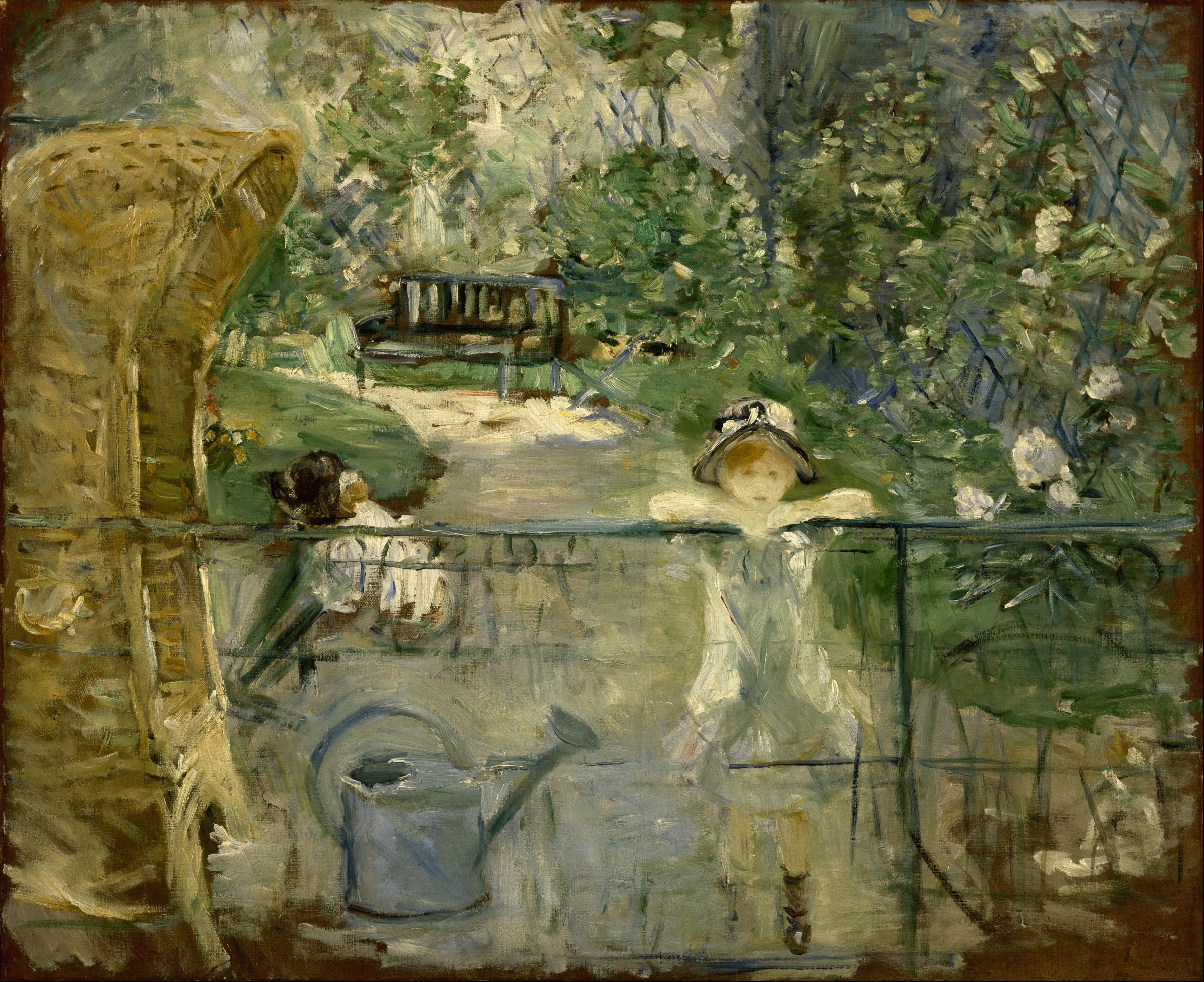
Berthe Morisot, The Basket Chair (1882), 61.3 x 75.5 cm

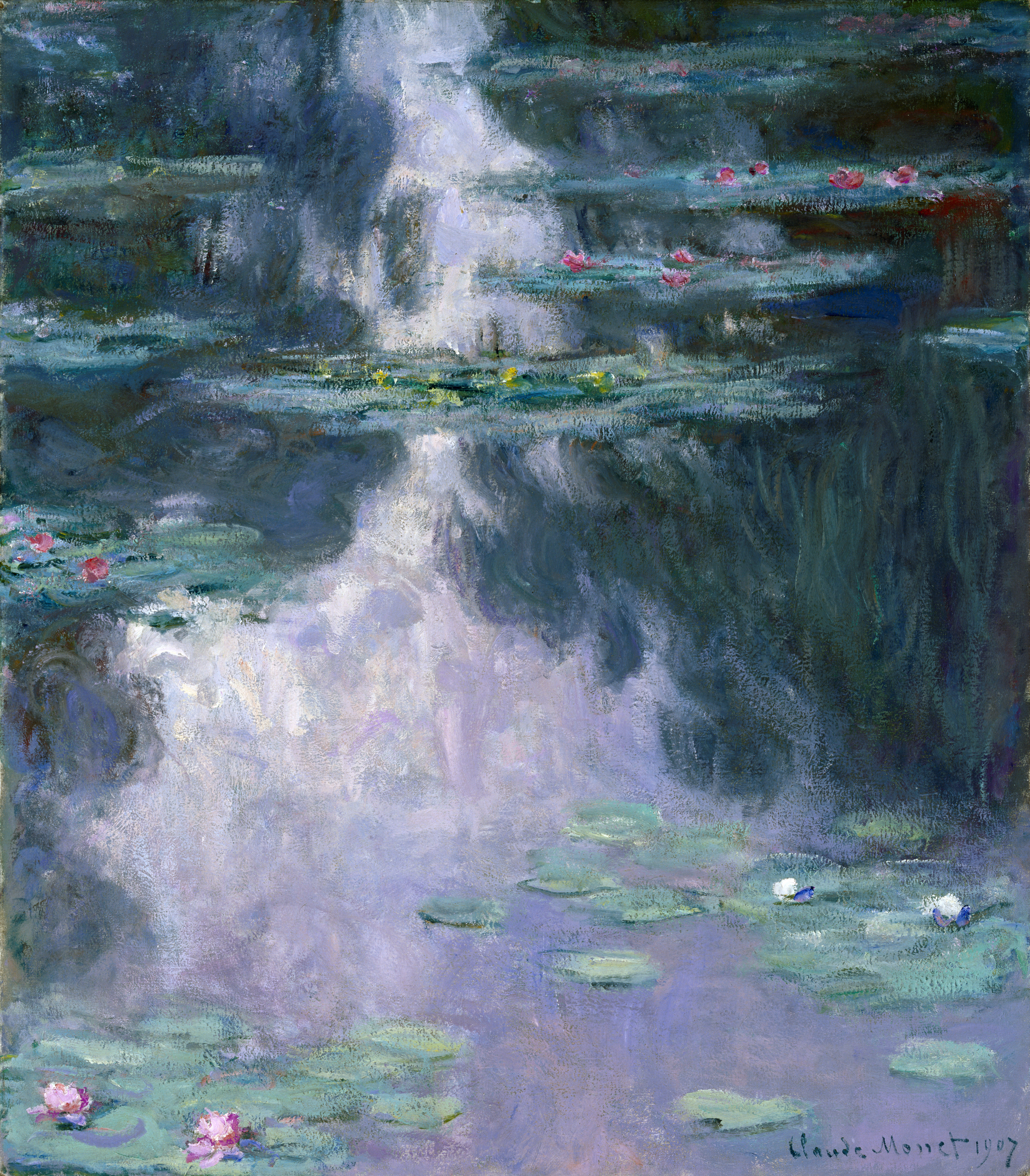
Claude Monet, Water Lilies (Nympheas) (1907), 92.1 × 81.2 cm

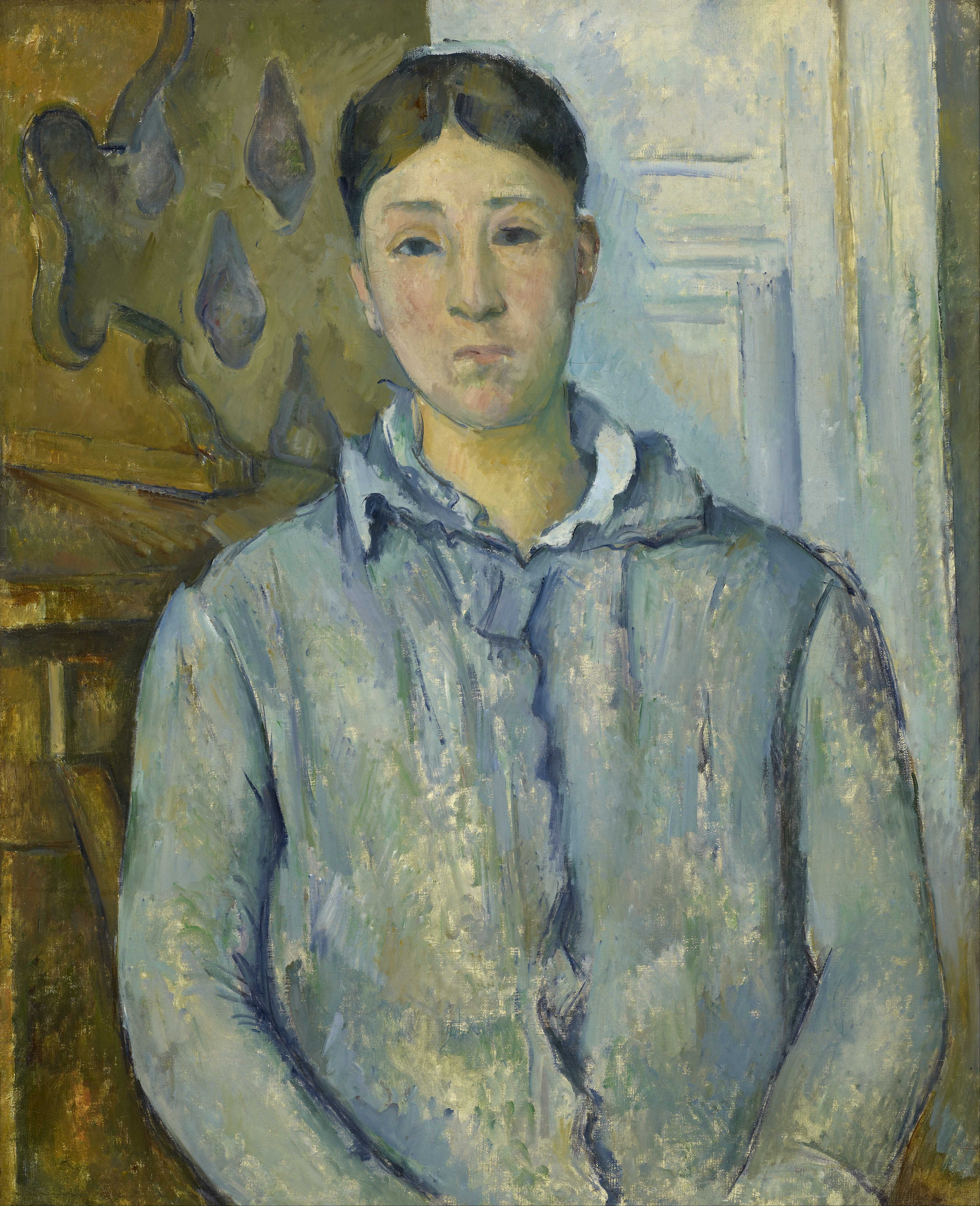
Paul Cézanne, Madame Cézanne in Blue (1888–1890), 74.1 × 61 cm

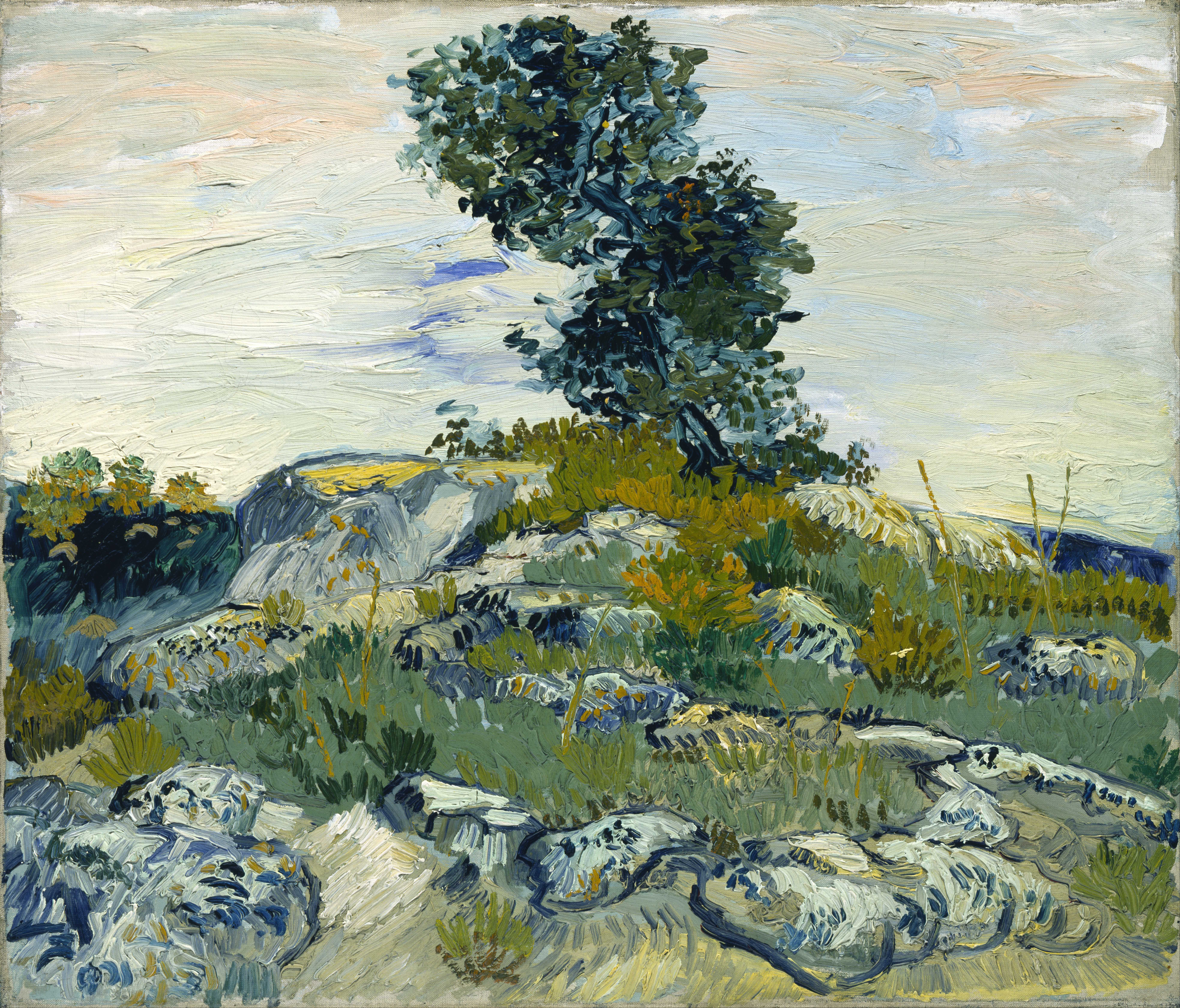
Vincent van Gogh, The Rocks (1888), 54.9 × 65.7 cm

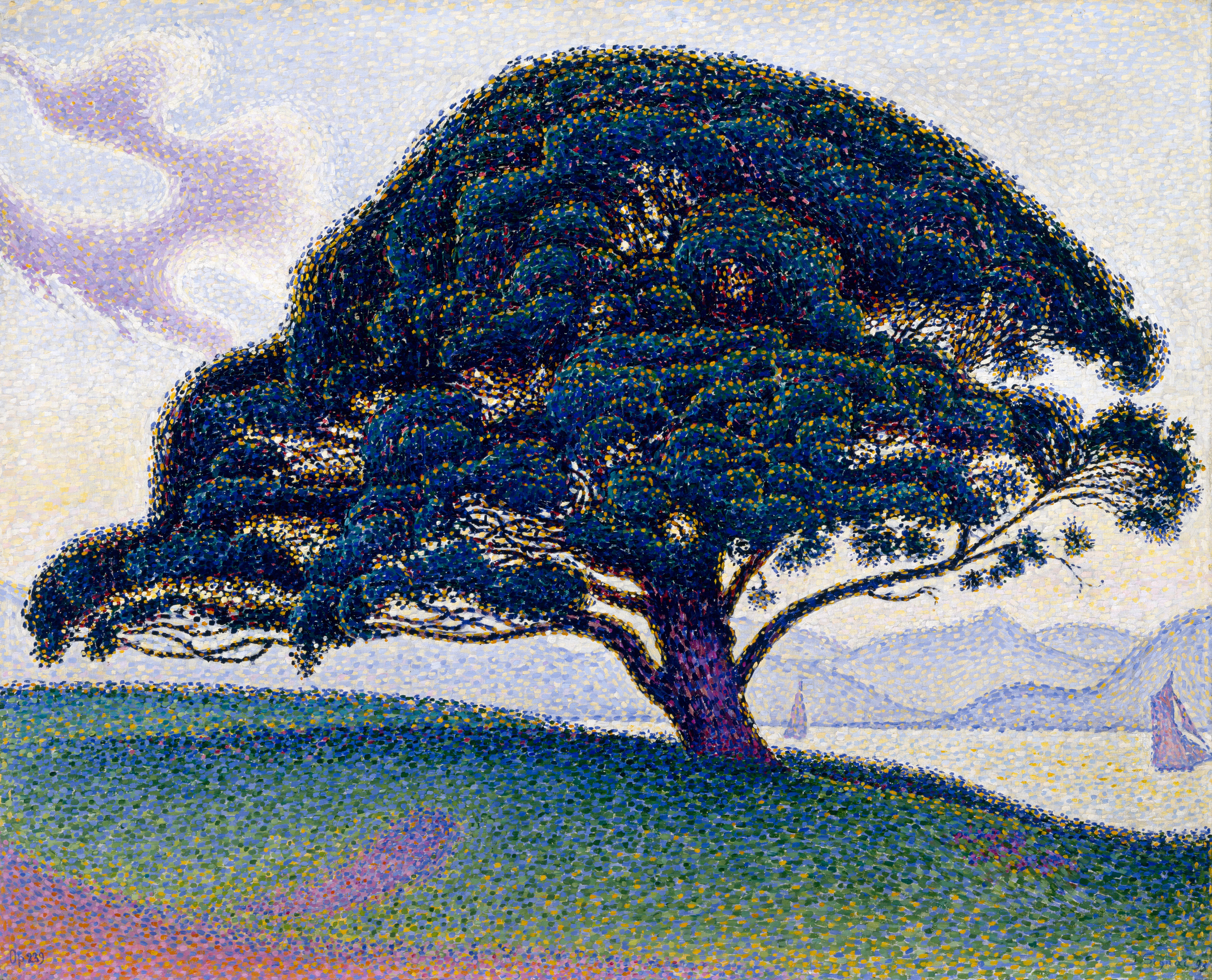
Paul Signac, The Bonaventure Pine (1893), 65.7 × 81 cm

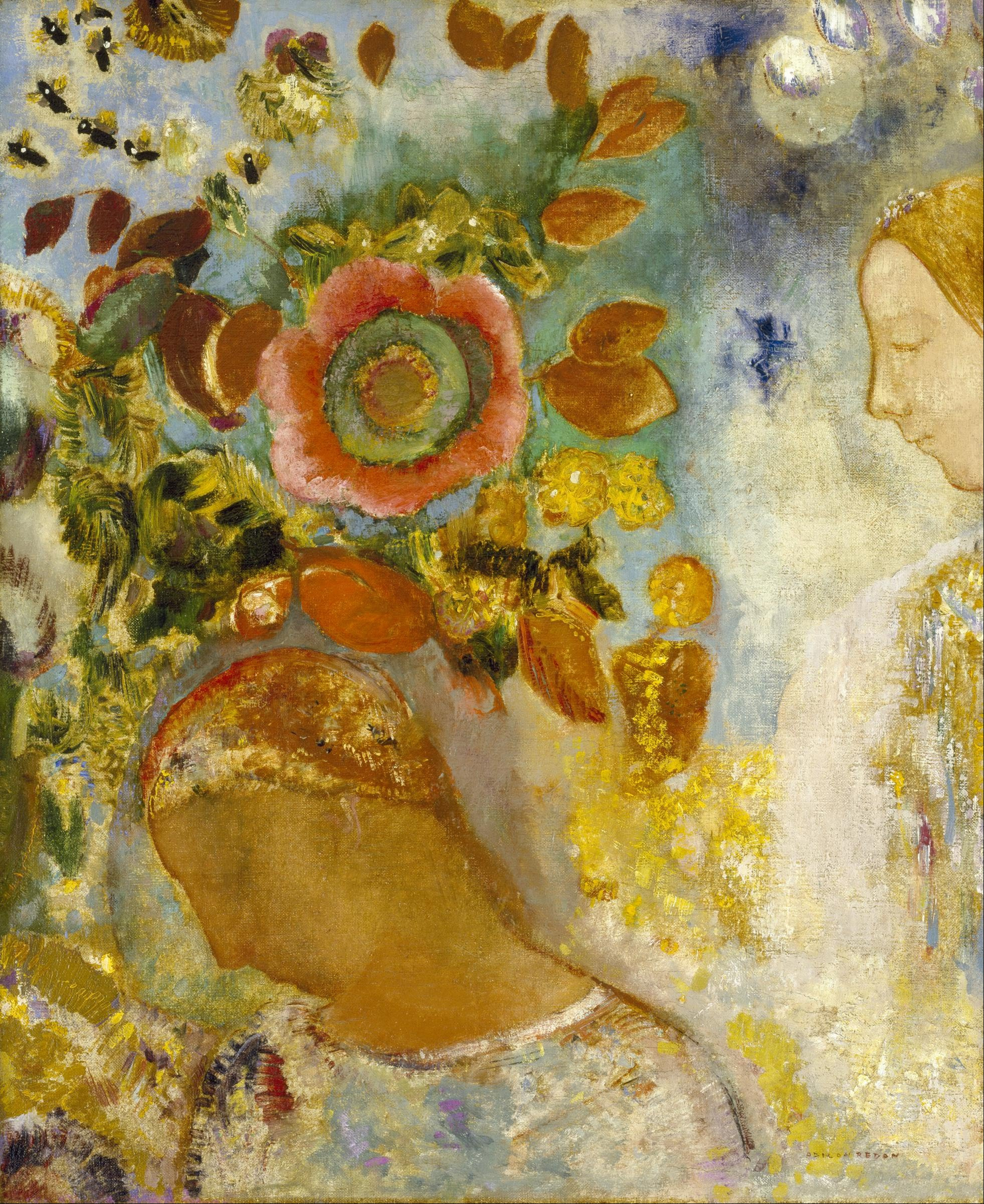
Odilon Redon, Two Young Girls among Flowers (1912), 62.2 x 51.4 cm

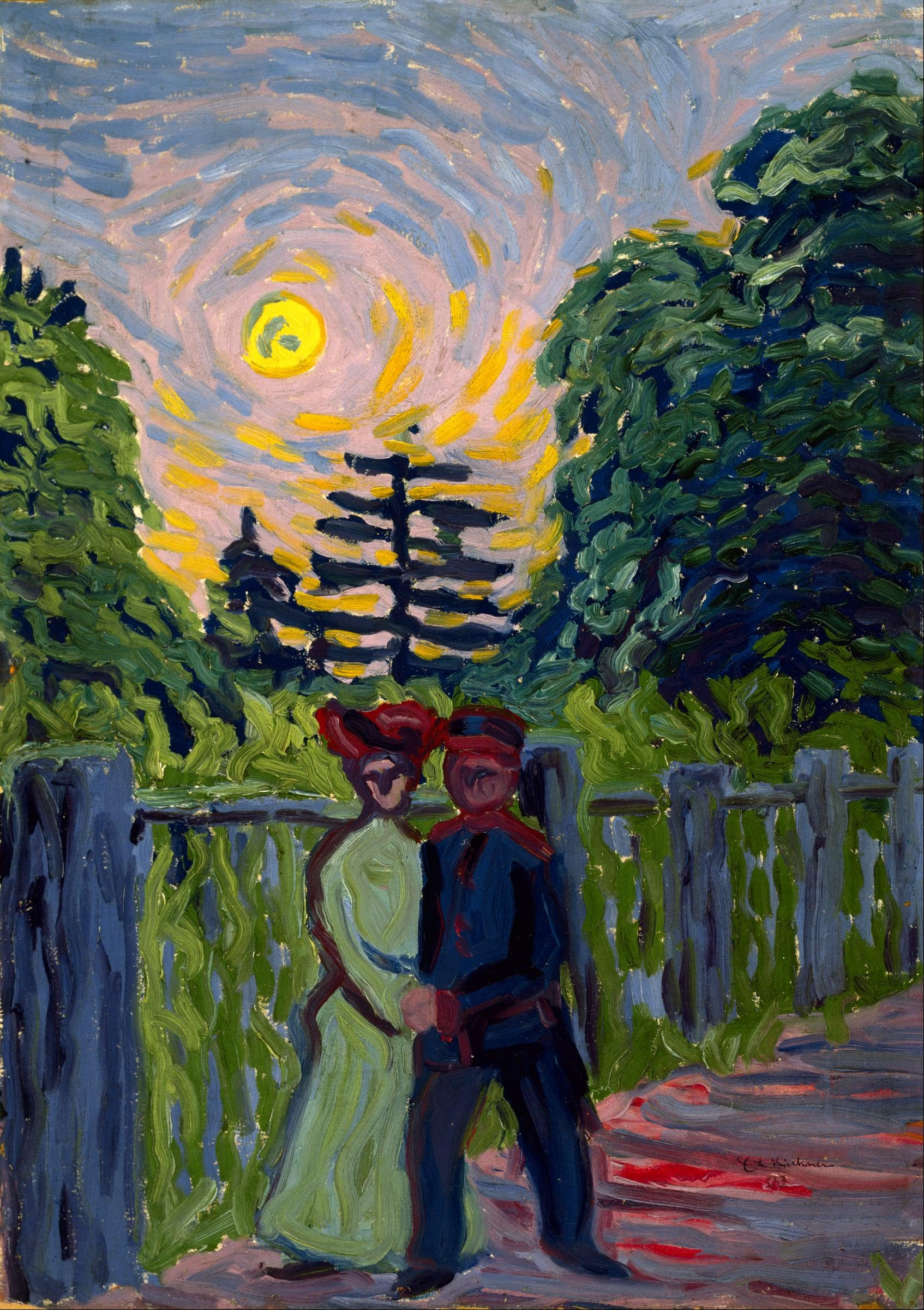
Ernst Ludwig Kirchner, Moonrise: Soldier and Maiden (1905), oil on board, 69.9 x 49.5 cm

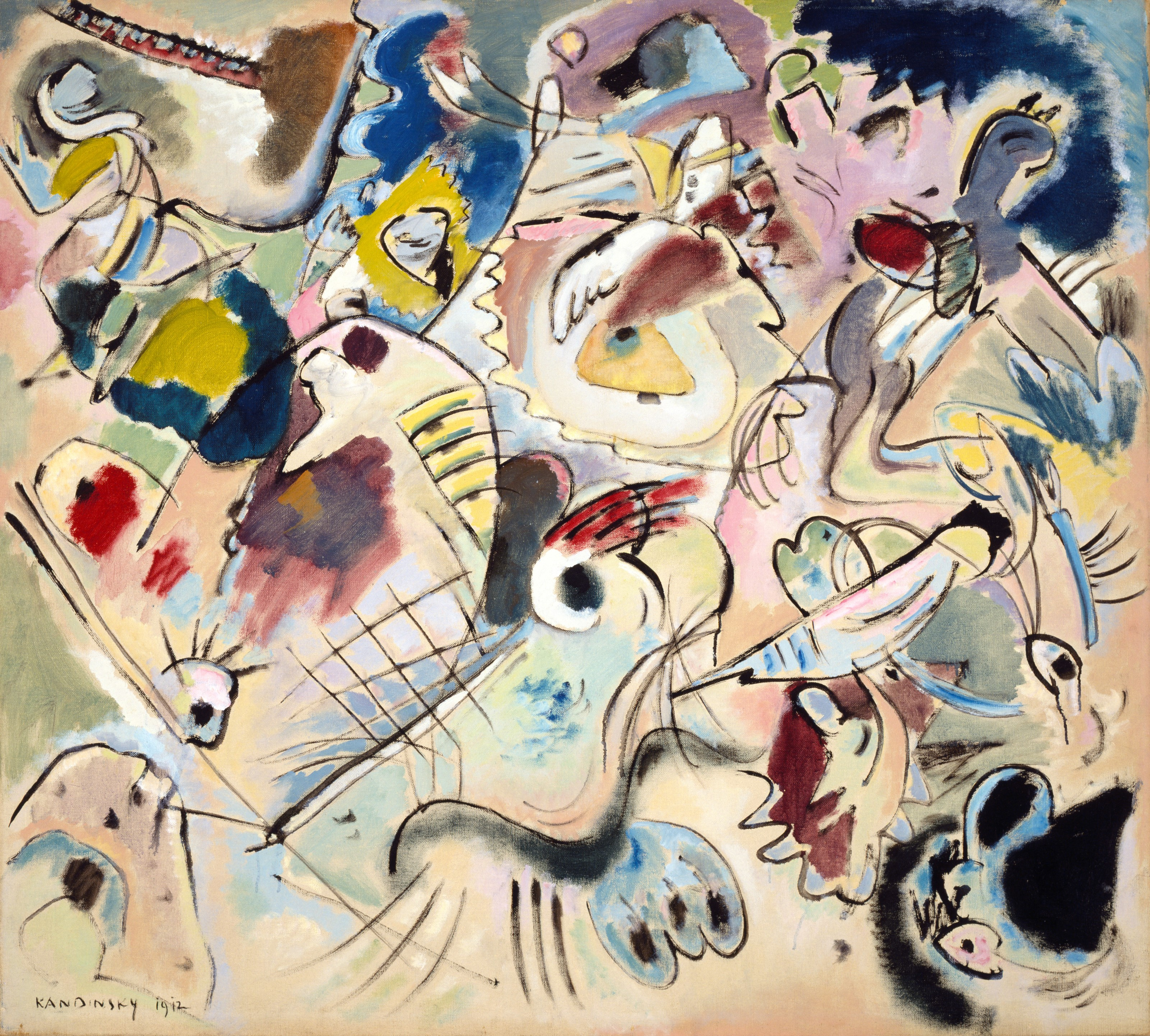
Vasily Kandinsky, Sketch 160A (1912), 94.9 × 108 cm

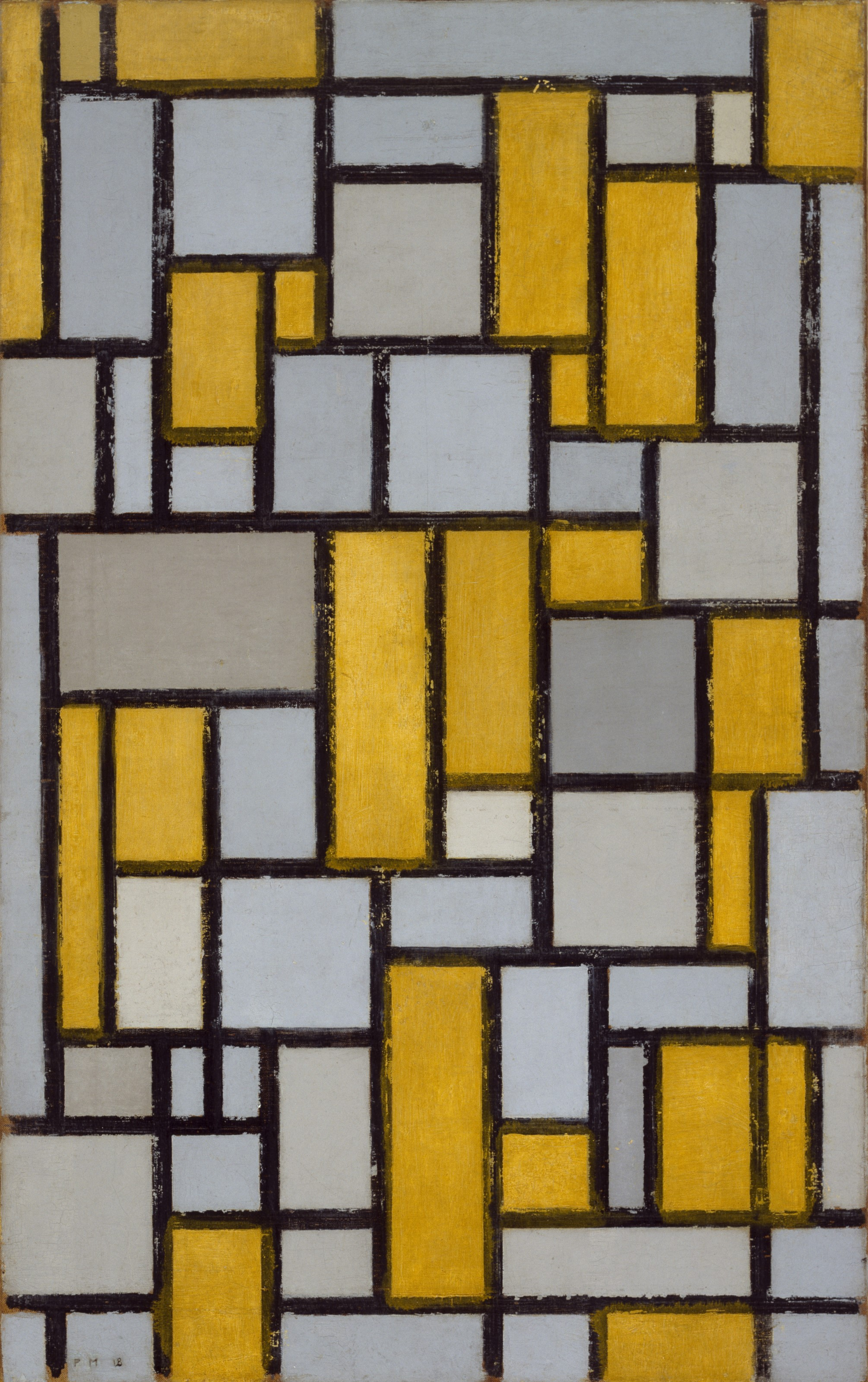
Piet Mondrian, Composition with Grid No. 1 (1918), 80.2 x 49.9 cm

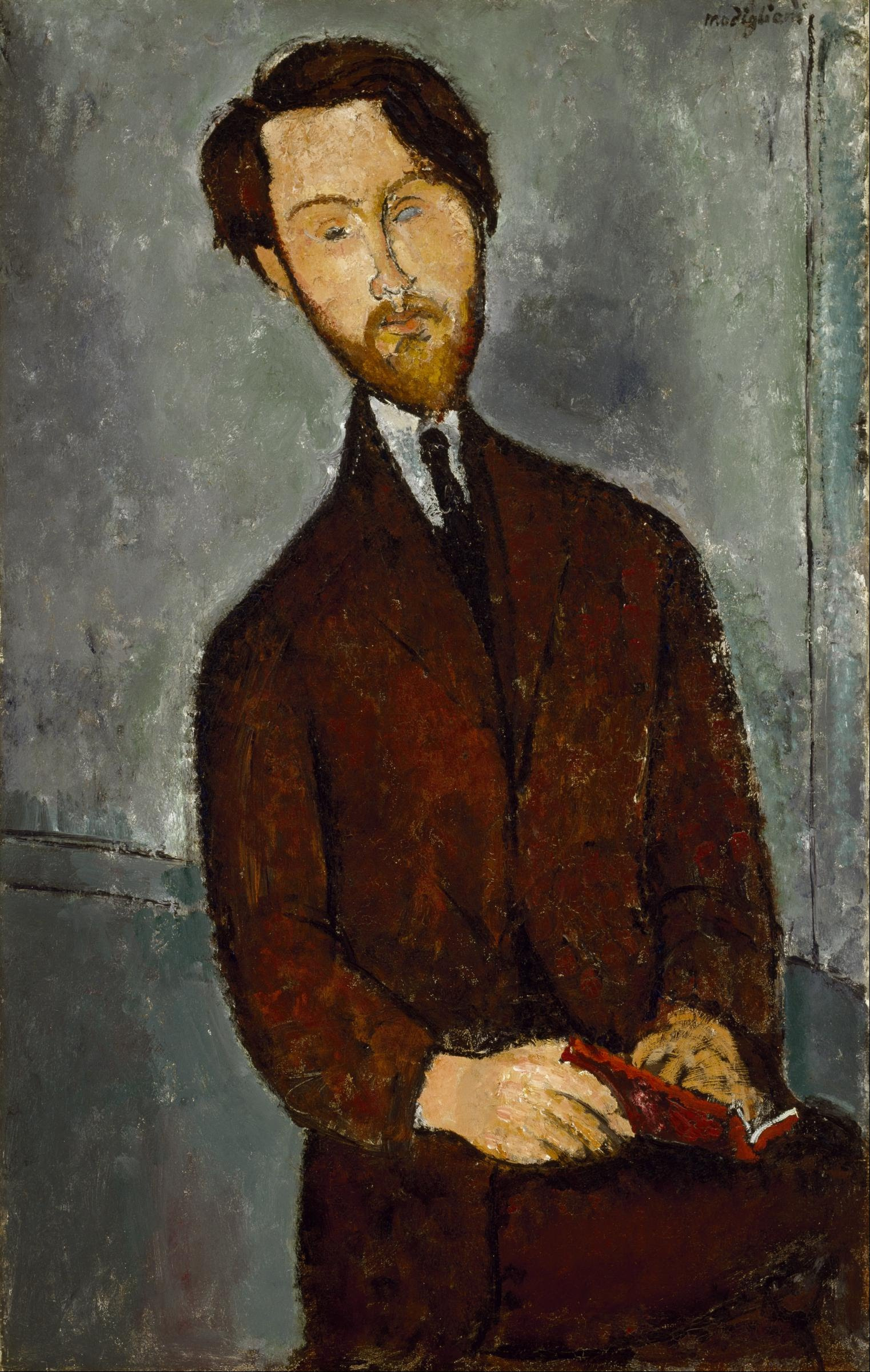
Amedeo Modigliani, Léopold Zborowski (c. 1916), 116.2 × 73 cm

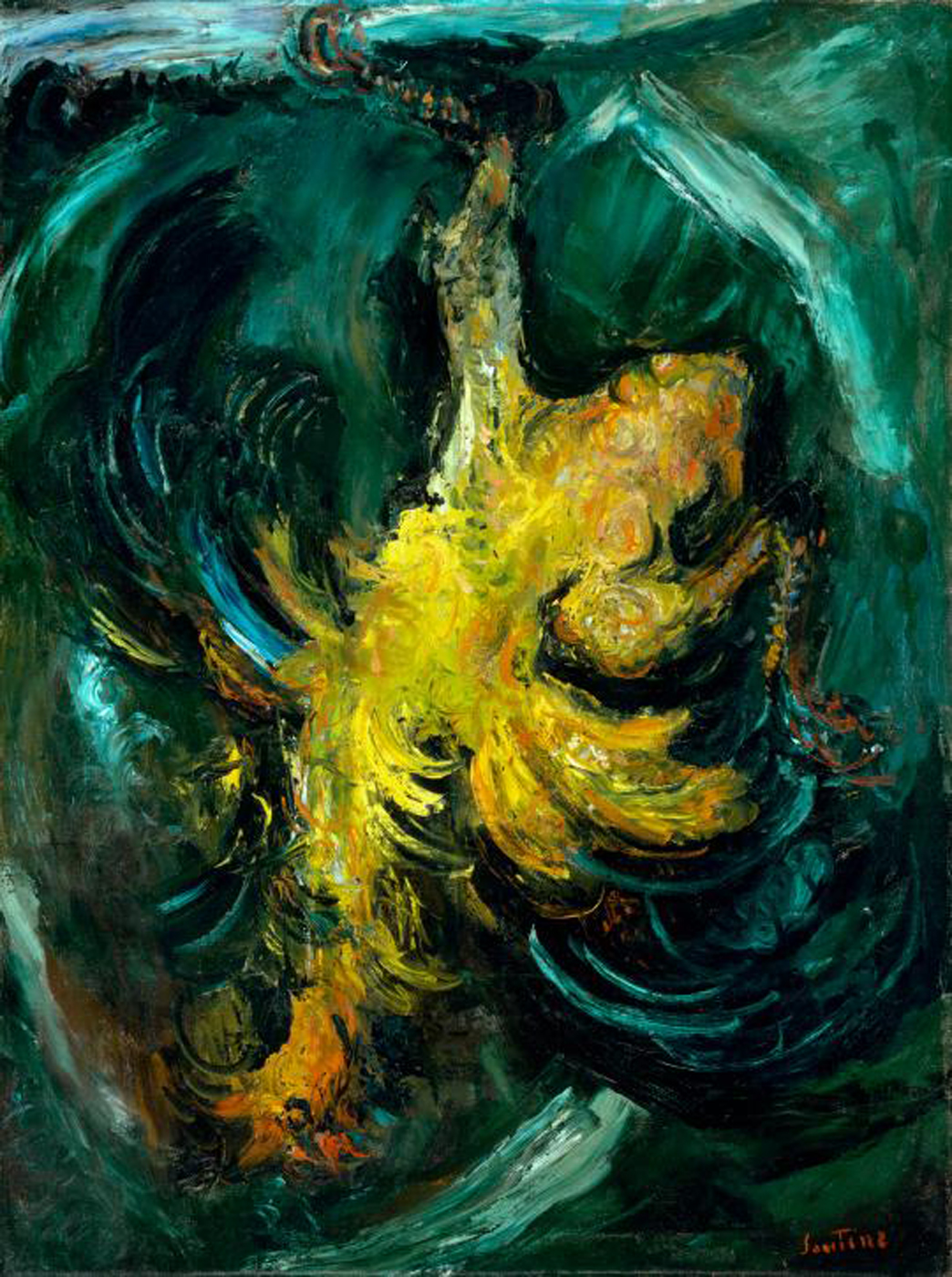
Chaïm Soutine, The Chicken (c. 1926), 102.2 × 76.1 cm

== Management ==
James Chillman, Jr., the museum's founding director, "developed a modest exhibition program that consisted primarily of locally organized shows." In 1954, Lee Malone became the museum's first full-time director. He initiated a more ambitious exhibition schedule, which included national and international sources. The Blaffer Memorial Wing and new Galleries were opened in 1953. Cullinan Hall, designed by Ludwig Mies van der Rohe, opened in 1958.James Johnson Sweeney, a former director of New York City's Guggenheim Museum, was appointed director in 1961, at which time he "ushered in a new era of aesthetic sophistication during his six-year term." Sweeney organized exhibitions that brought national prominence to Houston, including: Three Spaniards: Picasso, Miró, Chillida (1961), Derain: Before 1915 (1961), The Olmec Tradition (1963), and The Heroic Years: Paris 1908–1914 (1965). He instituted juried competitions, and "significantly expanded" the modern and non-Western collections, assisted by gifts of Pre-Columbian works from Alice Nicholson Hanszen and African and Oceanic works from Dominique and John de Menil.

Philippe de Montebello directed the museum from 1969 to 1974, before returning to the Metropolitan Museum of Art. He organized the museum into departments, professionalized the staff, developed endowments, and broadened its collecting mission to include all parts of the world. de Montebello developed the classical, Medieval, Renaissance, and Baroque collections. The important Beck Collection of Impressionist and Post-Impressionist paintings was secured during his tenure, but he was regarded as being anti-contemporary art.

William Agee, the MFAH's next director, served for eight years, He had an interest in modern art, and two of his most significant exhibitions treated American abstraction during the 1920s and 30s: Modern American Painting, 1910–1940: Toward a New Perspective (1977) and Patrick Henry Bruce: American Modernist (1979). A new school and sculpture garden were completed under Agee's tenure.

During the 28-year tenure of Peter Marzio between 1982 and 2010, the Museum of Fine Arts’ yearly attendance increased to roughly two million from 300,000; its operating budget climbed to $52 million from $5 million, and its endowment reached $1 billion (before the 2008 recession dropped its value to about $800 million). The museum's permanent collection more than tripled in size, to 63,000 works from 20,000. In 2010, Marzio was the sixth-highest-paid charity chief executive in the country, with compensation in 2008 of $1,054,939.

A year after Peter Marzio died in 2010, Gary Tinterow was appointed as the museum's director, a position he commenced in 2012. Tinterow, who had grown up in Houston, previously headed the Dept. of 19th Century, Modern, and Contemporary Art at the Metropolitan Museum of Art in New York, where he had mounted important exhibitions: Degas (1988), Origins of Impressionism (1994), Francis Bacon (2009), Manet/Velazquez (2003), and Picasso in the Metropolitan Museum of Art (2010) and made important acquisitions, by artists from Géricault to van Gogh.

At the time of his appointment in Houston, half of the MFAH's 63,000 artworks were made after 1900, which necessitated a need to create the Kinder building in which to exhibit them, a project Tinterow oversaw to completion. Tinterow says "our primary mission and focus [is] to make this a place for all people—all colors, religions, all ages, all abilities." Seeking to make Houston an art destination city, Tinterow arranged shows of Spanish painting from the Prado, Black and White works by Picasso, and the al-Sabah collection from Kuwait.

Mari Carmen Ramírez, a Puerto Rican Art curator, was hired in 2001 to head what was the first curatorial Department of Latin American Art in the United States. She is currently the Wortham Curator of Latin American Art, and she also heads the International Center for the Arts of the Americas, which she cofounded with Marzio in 2001.

== See also ==
- Bayou Bend Collection and Gardens
- Ima Hogg
- Samuel Henry Kress
- List of largest art museums
- List of most-visited museums in the United States
- List of claims for restitution for Nazi-looted art
