= Simone Wicha =

American museum director

Simone J. Wicha
- Born: El Paso, Texas
- Education: University of Texas at Austin
- Occupations: Museum director, arts administrator
- Known for: Director of the Blanton Museum of Art

Simone J. Wicha is an arts administrator and museum director known for her tenure as director of the Blanton Museum of Art at the University of Texas at Austin. She was appointed director in 2011 and has led institutional initiatives that expanded the museum's profile, programs, and public presence.

== Early life and education ==
Simone Wicha was born in El Paso, Texas and grew up in Mexico City. She later attended the University of Texas at Austin, where she studied mathematics before moving into museum work.

== Career ==
Wicha joined the Blanton Museum of Art in a development role and, after serving in a series of leadership positions including deputy director, was appointed executive director of the museum in 2011.

During her tenure at the Blanton Museum of Art, Wicha has overseen several major projects, including the realization of Austin, a permanent work of art and architecture by Ellsworth Kelly sited on the museum grounds. The work opened in February 2018 and “put the museum on the international art map," according to The New York Times. Austin was later featured on the cover of Artforum in May 2018.

Wicha also led a multiyear redesign of the museum's campus and arrival spaces in collaboration with Norwegian architectural firm Snøhetta, which broke ground in early 2021. As part of the project, Wicha oversaw the commissioning and installation of public works by Carmen Herrera, Kay Rosen and Gabriel Dawe. During this period, the Blanton Museum of Art received increased national attention and was selected as one of the "best college art museums in America" by The Washington Post in 2024.

Amid the COVID-19 pandemic, Wicha implemented staff redeployment and other measures to avoid layoffs, an approach she described in public commentary and an opinion piece in The Wall Street Journal. Her staffing strategy during the pandemic received coverage in major art and general-interest outlets.

== Selected initiatives and recognition ==
- Leading institutional fundraising, public programming, and exhibitions that raised the Blanton's profile nationally.
- Realization and interpretation of Ellsworth Kelly's Austin, a high-profile permanent installation associated with the museum.
- Public commentary on museum management and policy, including on approaches to staffing and operations during crisis.

== Selected publications and media ==
- Wicha, Simone J., "The Creative Way We Avoided Layoffs" (op-ed), The Wall Street Journal, 2020.
- Interviews and feature profiles in major art media and local press.
