= Blanton Museum of Art =

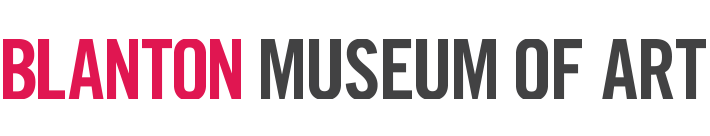

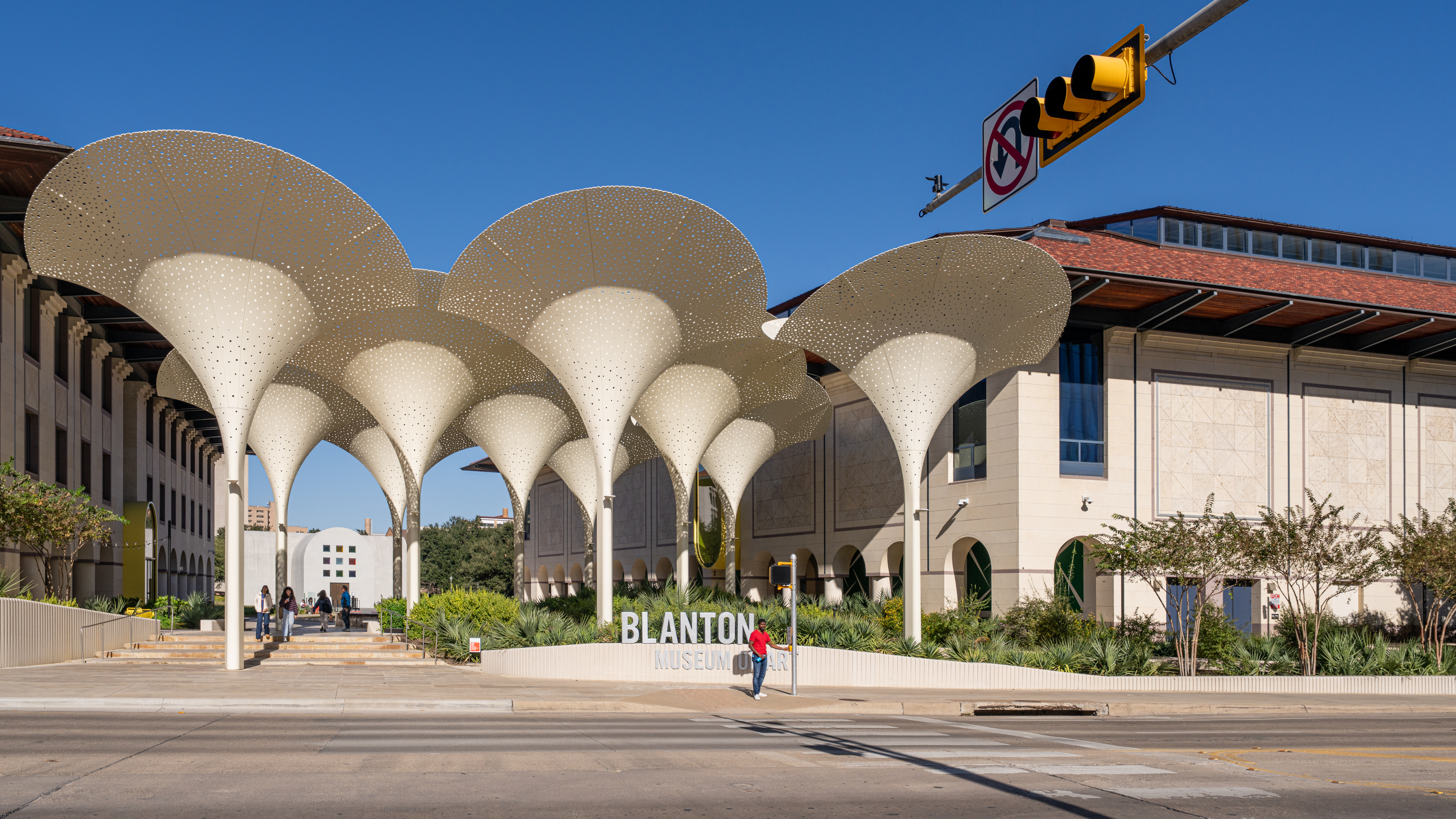
- Former name: University Art Museum; Archer M. Huntington Art Gallery
- Established: 1963
- Location: Austin, Texas
- Type: Art museum
- Accreditation: American Alliance of Museums
- Collections: Old Master paintings, prints, drawings, Minimalism, Post-minimalism, Conceptual art, Latin American art, Western American Art, Antiquities
- Collection size: 22,000 objects
- Visitors: 236,730 (2025)
- Director: Simone Wicha (from 2011)
- Website: www.blantonmuseum.org

The Jack S. Blanton Museum of Art (often referred to as the Blanton or the BMA) at the University of Texas at Austin is one of the largest university art museums in the U.S. with 189,340 square feet devoted to temporary exhibitions, permanent collection galleries, storage, administrative offices, classrooms, a print study room, an auditorium, shop, and cafe. The Blanton's permanent collection consists of more than 22,000 works, with significant holdings of modern and contemporary art, Latin American art, Old Master paintings, and prints and drawings from Europe, the United States, and Latin America. In 2024, the Blanton was ranked by the Washington Post as one of the five best college art museums in the U.S., "thanks to its dynamic programs, commitment to research and public-facing engagement."

== History ==
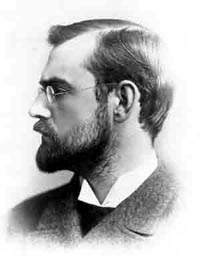
Archer M. Huntington

In 1927, American philanthropist and scholar Archer M. Huntington donated approximately 4,300 acres of land in Galveston County to the University of Texas at Austin for the use and benefit of a museum. Originally valued at $145,000, the gift became the Archer M. Huntington Museum Fund. Over the next century, the Huntington Fund would be used to acquire more than 1400 works of art, ranging from an early Corinthian round aryballos (oil bottle), created c. 600 B.C.E., to the 4-minute video Nuevo [New] by Russian artist Anton Vidokle, created in 2003 and acquired using the Fund in 2004.

The Huntington Fund also contributed $600,000 of the $1.5 million raised to construct the Art Building to house both the University's Art Department and the University Art Museum (later named the Archer M. Huntington Gallery), which opened its doors to the public in late 1963. In 1964, Donald Goodall became the museum's first director.

By 1972, a portion of the museum's collection was housed at the Harry Ransom Humanities Center, including the collection of paintings donated by James Michener and his wife, Mari Yoriko Sabusawa, and the Battle Collection of Plaster Casts, reproductions of ancient Greek and Roman sculpture. The print study room and temporary exhibition galleries remained at the Art Department. In 1979, Eric S. McCready became the museum's second director, and the museum was renamed the Archer M. Huntington Art Gallery shortly thereafter.

In 1993, Jessie Otto Hite became the museum's third director. In 1994, Mari Yoriko Sabusawa gave $5 million for the construction of a new museum complex which would unite the University's various art collection in a single place. The campaign to build a new building began in 1997 with a $12 million gift from the Houston Endowment, Inc. in honor of its then-chairman, Jack S. Blanton. The museum was renamed the Blanton Museum of Art, with construction on the new building commencing in 2003.

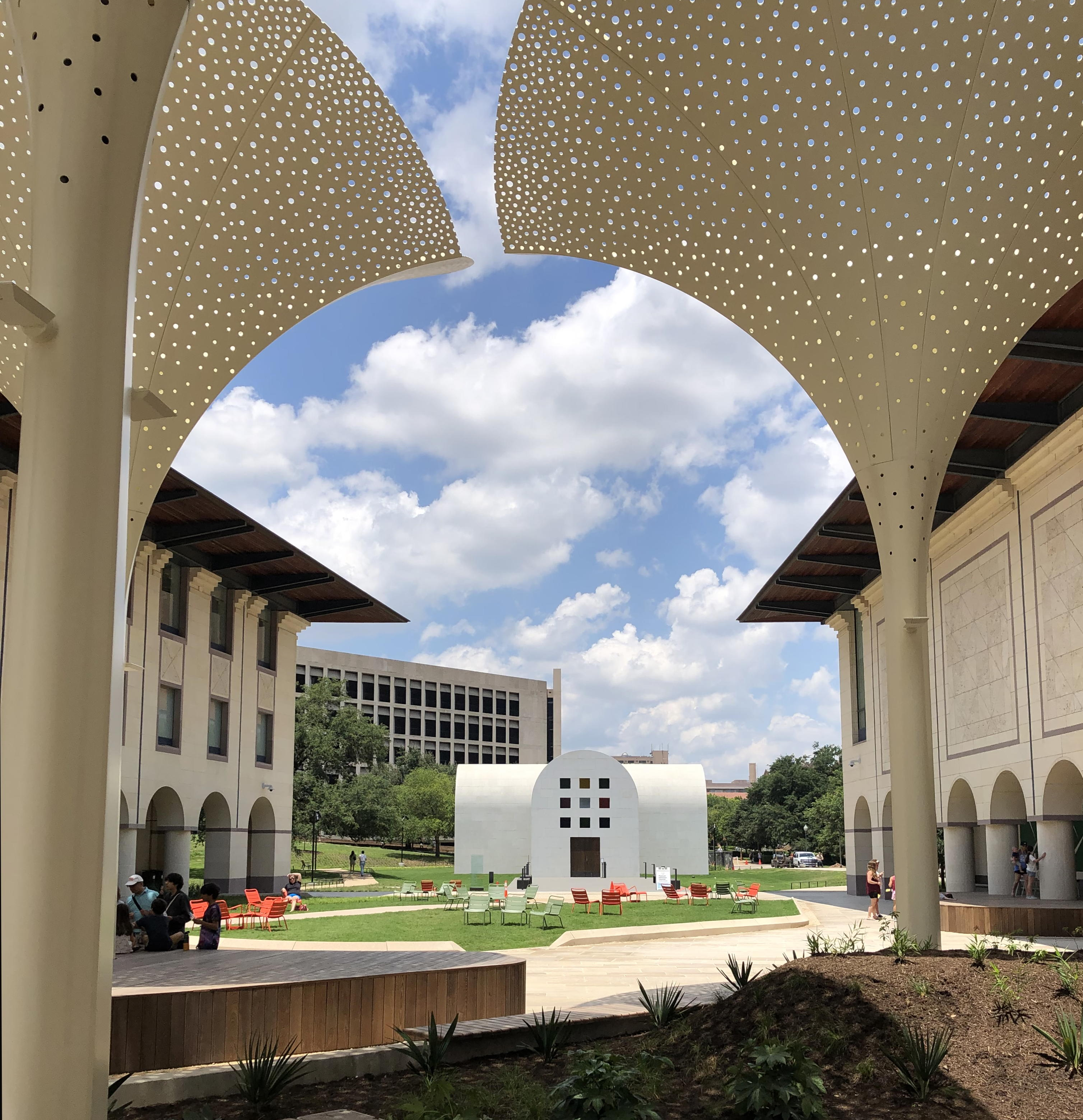
Exterior grounds and plaza designed by Snøhetta at the Blanton Museum include twelve towering, three-story-tall "petals." In the center of the photo is Ellsworth Kelly's Austin building .

The Swiss-based architectural firm Herzog & de Meuron was originally commissioned for the project, but resigned the commission in 1999 due to creative differences with the Board of Regents regarding adherence with the university's Campus Master Plan. Controversy ensued, and Lawrence Speck, disappointed in the series of events that led to Herzog & de Meuron's resignation, resigned as dean of the School of Architecture, although he remained a faculty member. The commission was ultimately given to the architectural firm Kallmann McKinnell & Wood.

The new gallery building, named the Mari and James A. Michener Gallery Building, opened to the public with a 24-hour marathon celebration in 2006. A second education and administration building (the Edgar A. Smith Building), totaling 56,000 square feet, opened in 2008. In 2009, Ned Rifkin was named to replace the retiring Jessie Otto Hite as director. In 2011, Simone Wicha was named director.

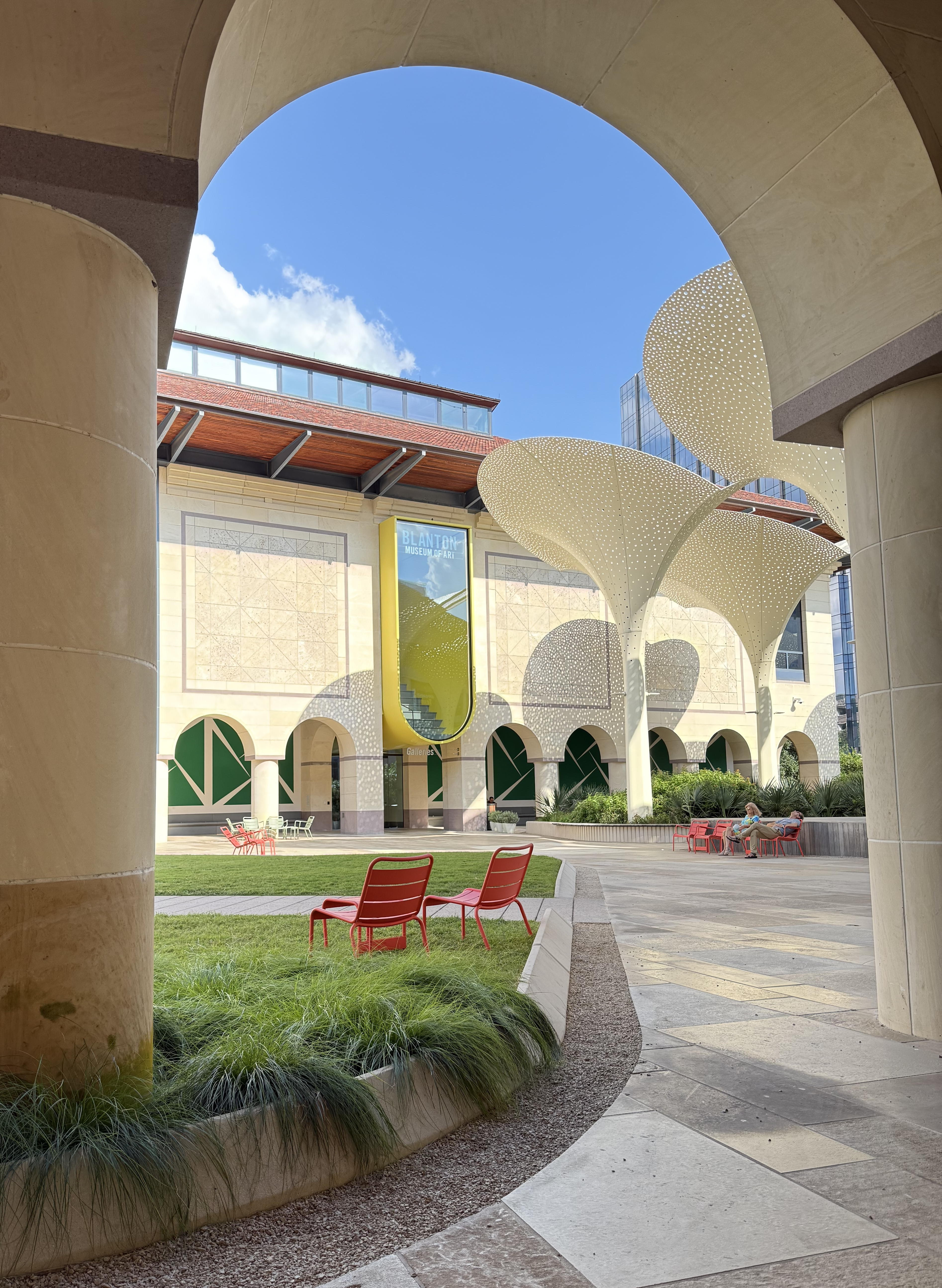
The Blanton's grounds in 2025

In January 2015, Ellsworth Kelly gifted to the Blanton Museum the design concept for a 2,715 square foot stone building with stained glass windows that he subsequently named Austin. The Blanton launched a $15 million campaign to realize the project, a number that eventually grew to $23 million. The building was opened to the public February 18, 2018.

In 2019, the Blanton received a $20 million gift from The Moody Foundation and began fundraising for a $35 million campus redesign to be headed by Snøhetta. In May 2023, the museum unveiled its "reimagined" exterior grounds and plaza. Additions included twelve three-story-tall "petals" providing shade for the newly created Moody Patio, and a site-specific mural by Cuban-American visual artist Carmen Herrera, Verde, que te quiero verde, spanning the entire length of the Michener Gallery Building’s loggia.

== Collections ==
The Blanton's permanent collection of more than 22,000 works is notable for its European paintings, prints and drawings, and modern and contemporary American and Latin American art.

=== Ancient art; Battle Collection of Plaster Casts ===
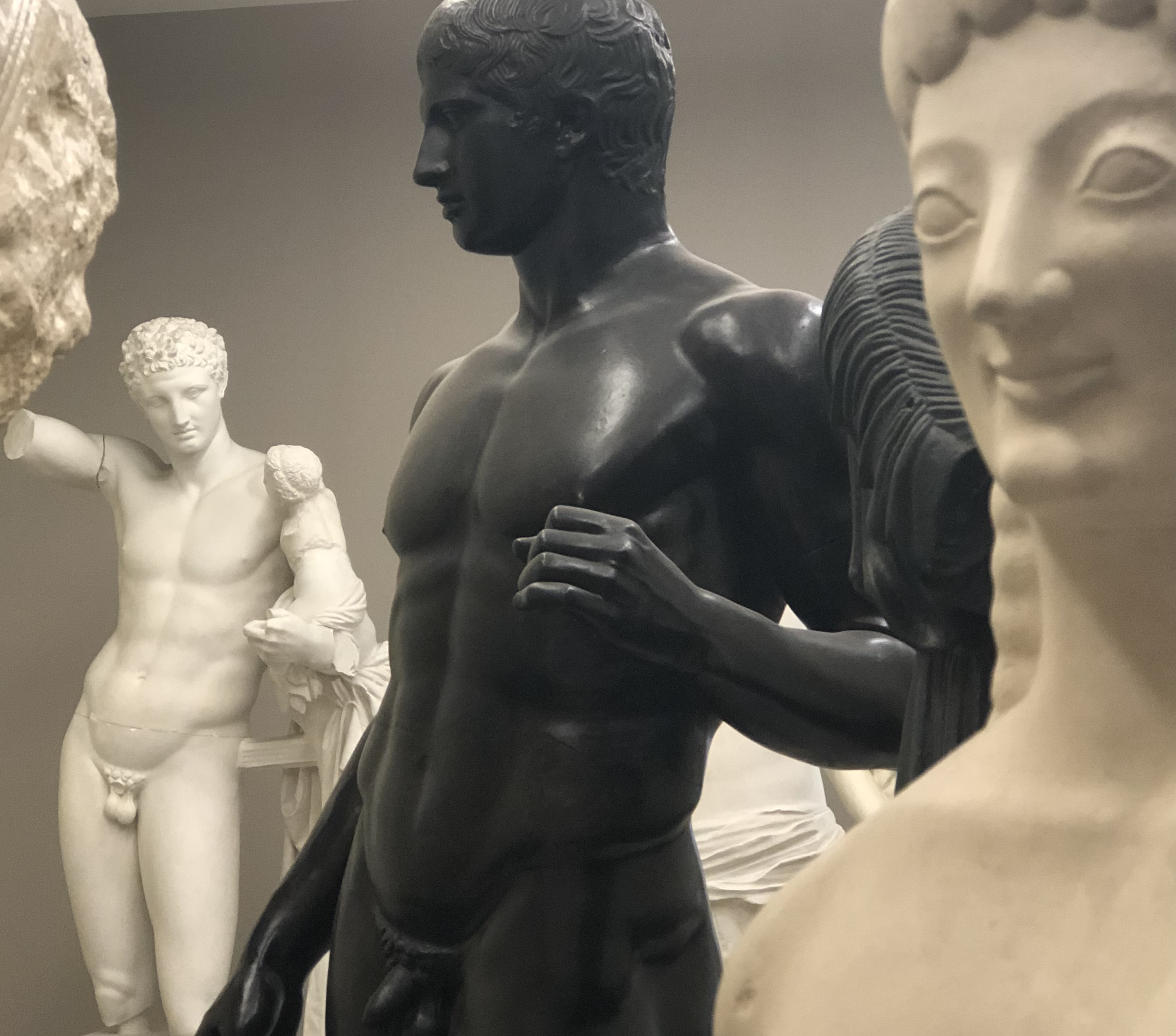
Battle Collection of Plaster Casts

The Blanton owns a collection of Greek, Etruscan, and Roman vases, the earliest of which date to the sixth century BCE. Many came from the Castle Ashby Collection formed by the Spencer Compton, 2nd Marquess of Northampton, who funded numerous excavations at Vulci, an Etruscan town north of Rome, during the 1820s.

Donated to the Blanton Museum of Art at its opening, the Battle Collection of Plaster Casts are on display adjacent to the Julia Matthews Wilkinson Center for Prints and Drawings. Collected by William James Battle, former professor and interim president of The University of Texas at Austin, the collection was purchased between 1894 and 1923 and includes 86 19th-century plaster reproductions of Greek and Roman art of antiquity, including full-size statues, architectural details, stelae, and reliefs.

=== Suida-Manning Collection; European art before 1900 ===
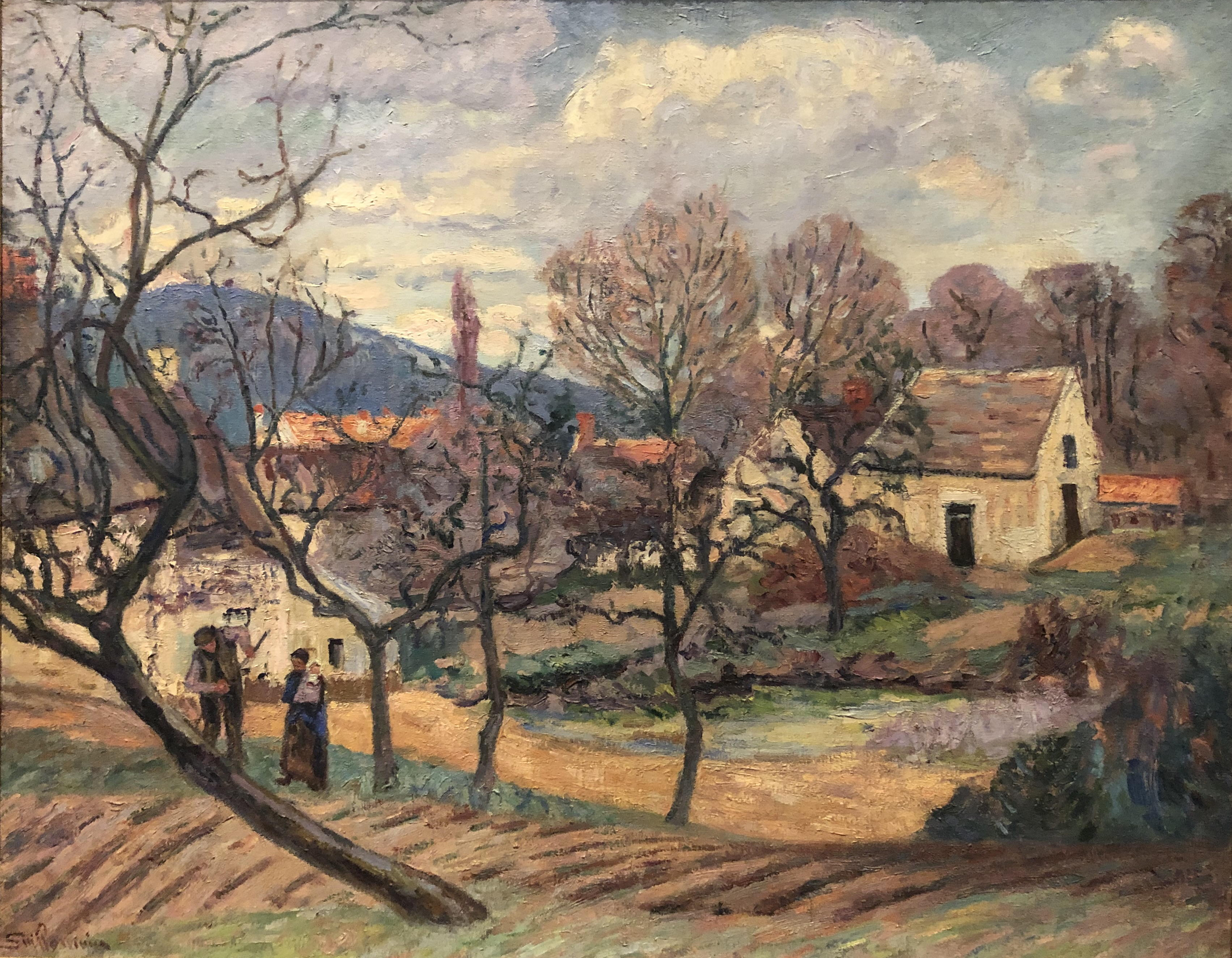
Armand Guillaumin, Environs de Paris, c. 1890.

The collection of European paintings, sculpture, and decorative arts before 1900 includes the Suida-Manning Collection of over 650 with works by artists from the 15th through 18th centuries including Parmigianino, Paolo Veronese, Tiepolo, Guercino, Rubens, Claude Vignon, Claude Lorrain, and Simon Vouet, as well as lesser-known but historically significant painters such as Daniele Crespi and Luca Cambiaso.

While the Suida-Manning Collection predominantly showcases Italian and French artists, bequests from Jack G. and Mary Taylor added to the collection 17th-century works by Dutch artists including Nicolaes Maes and by English artists, most notably portraits by Thomas Gainsborough, Thomas Lawrence, Henry Raeburn, and George Romney.

Displayed at the White House during the presidency of Lyndon Johnson, Armand Guillaumin's Environs de Paris (c. 1890) became the first Impressionist painting to enter the museum's collection when Lady Bird Johnson gave the work to the Blanton in 2004.

=== Modern and contemporary art ===
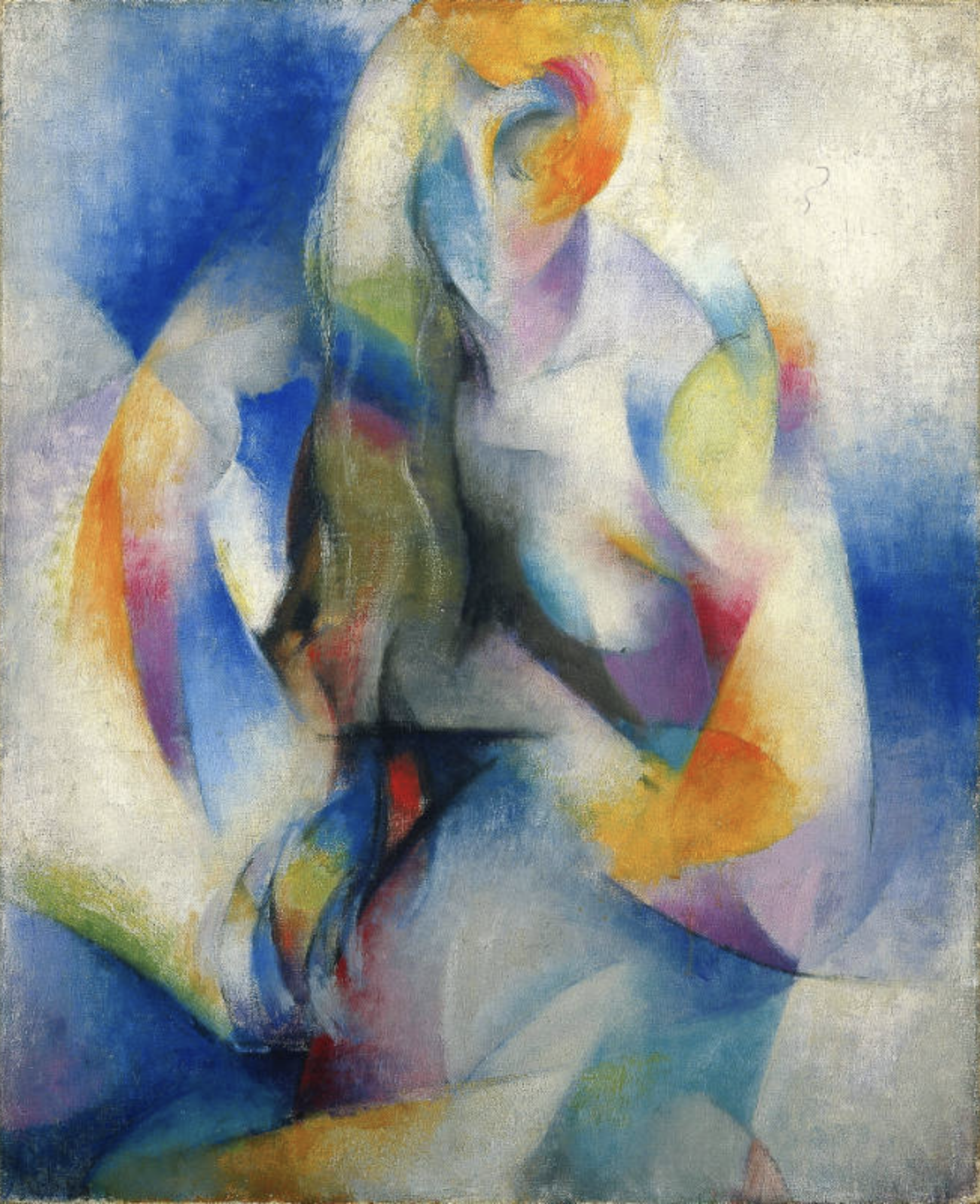
Stanton Macdonald-Wright, Synchromy in Purple Minor, 1910.

The Blanton's modern and contemporary art holdings comprise more than 4,000 objects. Novelist James Michener, and his wife, Mari Yoriko Sabusawa, began giving their collection of 20th-century American paintings to the Blanton in the 1960s. The gift spanned into the early 1990s and eventually totaled more than 300 works. The Micheners also gave acquisition funds to the museum, supporting the purchase of approximately 100 additional works.

The museum's collection includes 20th-century artists such as Thomas Hart Benton, Alice Neel, Brice Marden, Hans Hofmann, Philip Guston, Helen Frankenthaler, Jasper Johns, Roy Lichenstein, and Joan Mitchell. The Blanton's collection of contemporary art includes works by El Anatsui, Teresa Hubbard / Alexander Birchler, Natalie Frank, Nina Katchadourian, Byron Kim, Yayoi Kusama, Glenn Ligon, Donald Moffett, Susan Philipsz, and Tavares Strachan.

In 2009, Stacked Waters, an installation by artist Teresita Fernández commissioned by Jeanne and Michael Klein, debuted in the Rapoport Atrium of the Blanton Museum.

In 2014, the Blanton acquired an important group of drawings, prints, and a major painting by the African-American artist Charles White from Drs. Susan G. and Edmund W. Gordon.

=== Latin American art ===
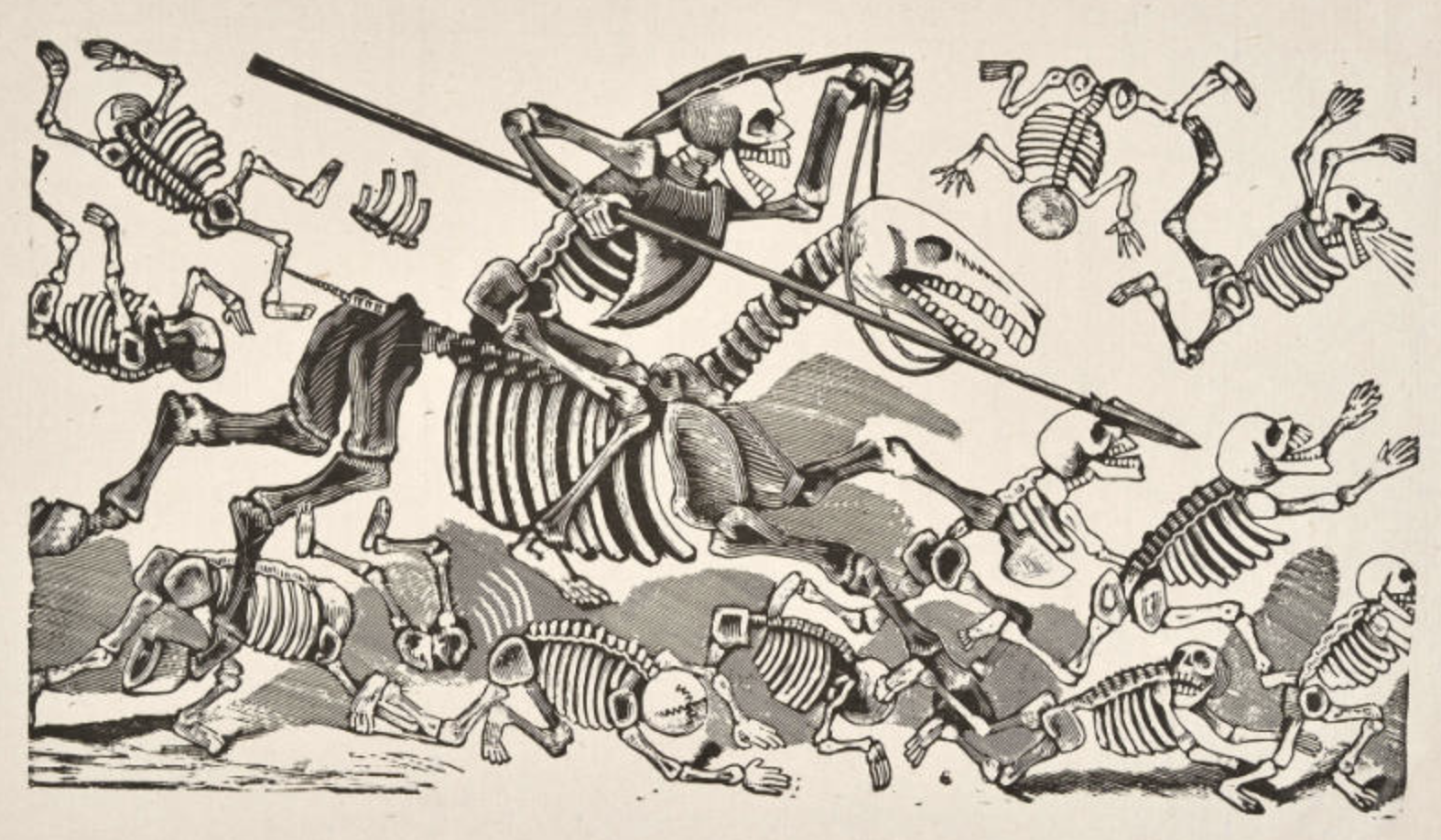
José Guadalupe Posada, Calavera de Don Quixote, c. 1910-1913.

Shortly after his appointment as founding director of the University of Texas Art Museum in Austin in 1959, Donald Goodall acquired for the Blanton what was at that time the largest collection of Latin American art in the United States. The Latin American collection expanded significantly in the 1970s and 1980s with gifts from collector Barbara Duncan of 277 works of art, including 58 paintings and 112 drawings. The museum was the first institution in the United States to create a curatorial position for Latin American art in 1988. The founding curator of the department was Mari Carmen Ramírez who acquired one of the signature works in the Latin American collection, Cildo Meireles' Missão/Missões: How to Build Cathedrals (1987). The museum received a notable addition of Latin American modern and midcentury Latin American art from collectors Judy and Charles Tate in 2015. The 114-object collection includes paintings, sculptures, and drawings by Diego Rivera, José Clemente Orozco, Tarsila do Amaral, Rufino Tamayo, Joaquín Torres García, Wifredo Lam, Herman Braun-Vega, Armando Reveron, Jesus Rafael Soto, and Lygia Clark, among others.

The Blanton also holds a significant collection of largely anonymous Christian religious art from the 17th century onward, including statues, paintings, and works in metal from across Latin America, a collection that parallels and complements the Medieval and Renaissance religious works by European artists in the Suida-Manning Collection.

=== The Julia Matthews Wilkinson Center for Prints and Drawings ===
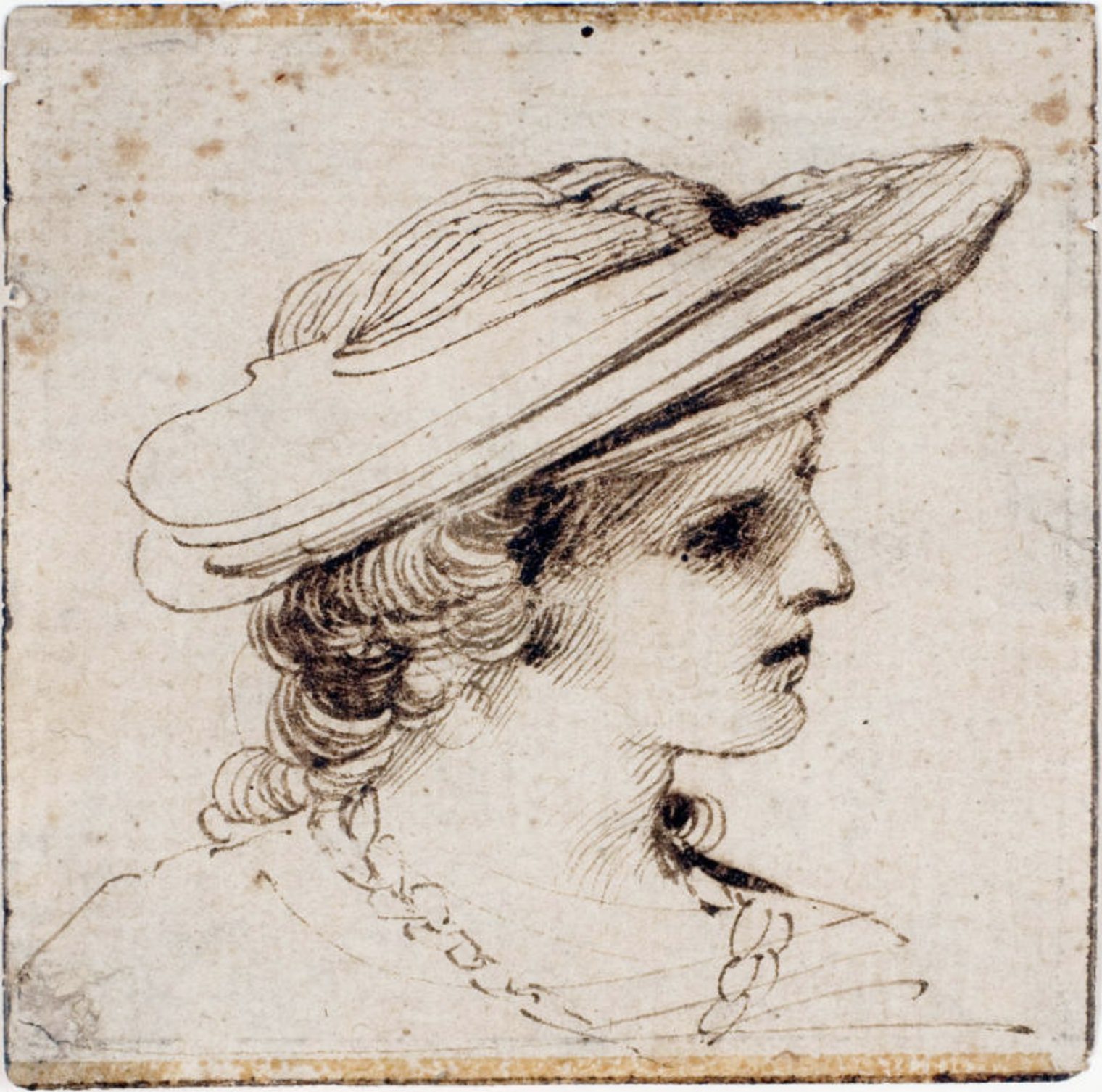
Guercino, Head of a Girl Wearing a Hat and a Necklace, pen and brown ink, 1612.

The Julia Matthews Wilkinson Center for Prints and Drawings houses most of the Blanton's 16,000 works on paper. The center also includes the H.E.B. print study room, a library, and curatorial offices. The center's holdings reflect the Blanton's fifty-year focus on three specific collecting areas: European art from 1450 to 1800, Latin American art after 1960, and American art of the 20th century.

The Wilkinson Center's holdings include over 380 drawings from the Suida-Manning Collection, most of them pre-1800 Italian, including drawings by Raphael, Correggio, and Guercino. Also representing European art from this period is the Leo Steinberg Collection of almost 3,500 prints, including early impressions by Hendrick Goltzius, Claude Lorrain, and Giovanni Benedetto Castiglione. The center's holdings in contemporary Latin American art feature several thousand works from eighteen Latin American countries and includes 230 works on paper from the Barbara Duncan Collection of Latin American Art. Prints and drawings by American artists since 1900 comprise about twenty-five percent of the Blanton's holdings on paper. Julia and Stephen Wilkinson and their Still Water Foundation gave over 1030 prints, primarily wood engravings from the first half of the 20th century tied to the tradition of social realism. Among them are 757 prints by Clare Leighton, best known for her images of rural workers.

=== Western American art ===
The Blanton's Western American holdings include the C.R. Smith Collection of Western American Art comprising 91 works given to the Blanton between 1968 and 1988. The collection includes works by Oscar E. Berninghaus, Albert Bierstadt, Solon H. Borglum, Dean Cornwell, Maynard Dixon, Henry Farny, Thomas Hill, Ransome Gillett Holdridge, Peter Hurd, Frank Tenney Johnson, Tom Lea, William Robinson Leigh, Alfred Jacob Miller, and Thomas Moran.

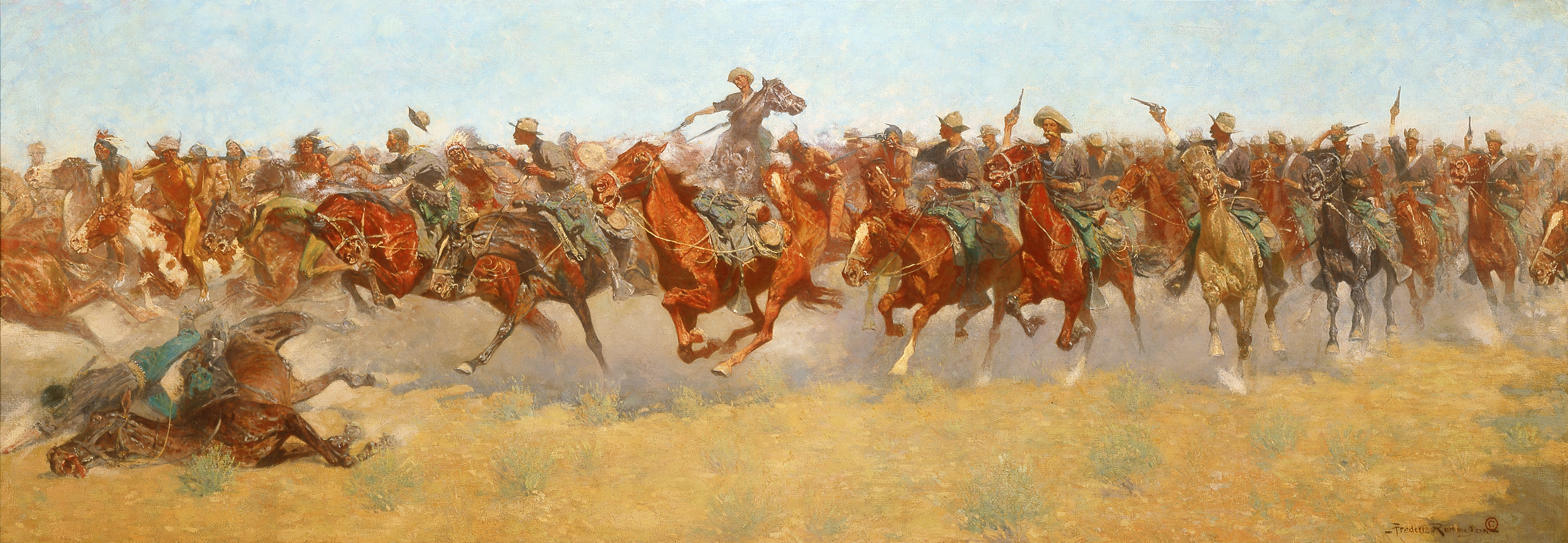
Frederic Remington, The Charge, 1906. At 49 by 137 inches, this was the artist's largest work.

=== Ellsworth Kelly's Austin ===
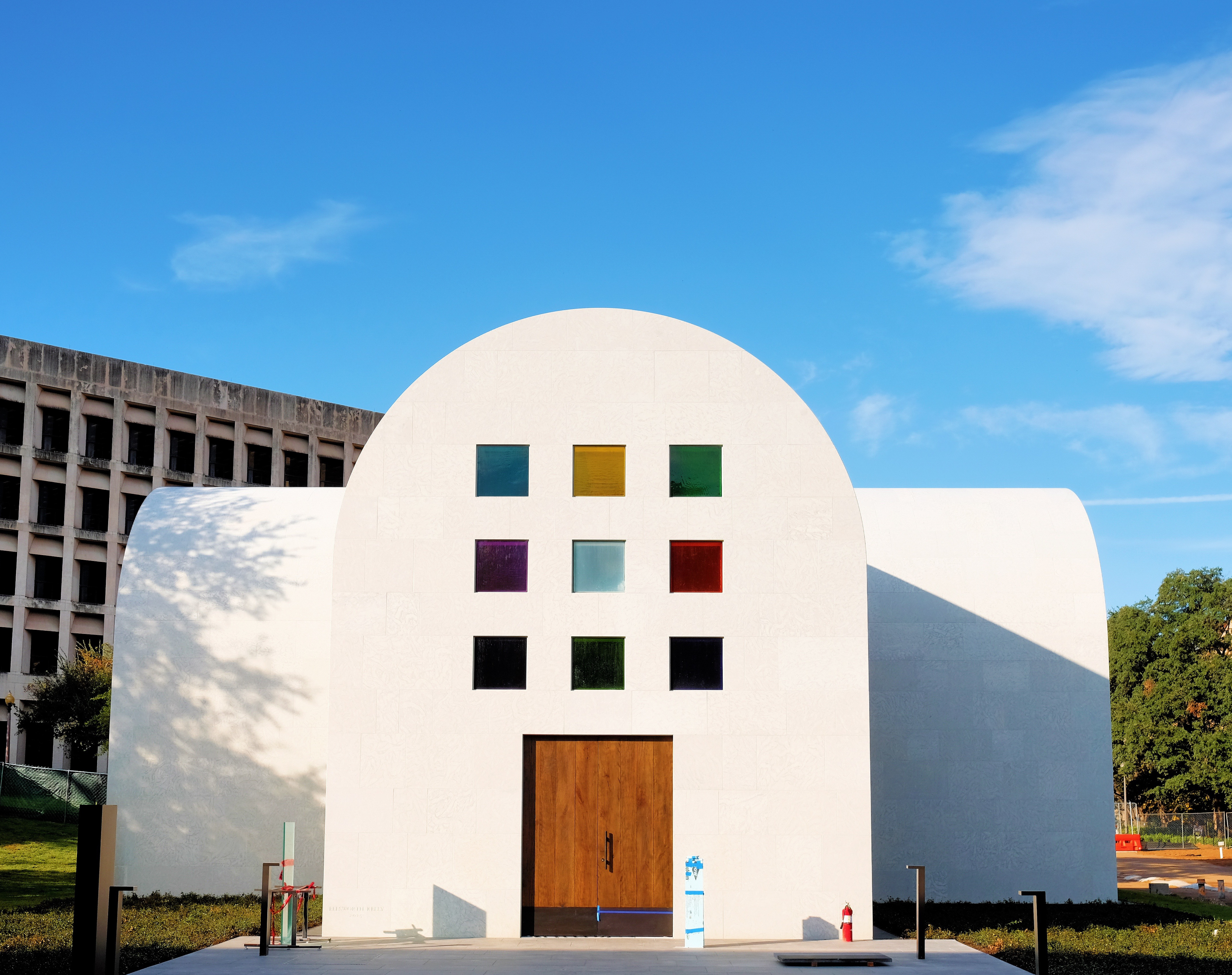
Ellsworth Kelly's Austin (2018).

In January 2015, the artist Ellsworth Kelly gave the Blanton the design concept for a 2,715-square-foot (252.2 m^{2}) stone building that he subsequently named Austin. This work of art relates to the tradition of modernist artist-commissioned buildings that includes Rothko Chapel and Henri Matisse's Matisse Chapel. Kelly said that the design of the building was inspired by Romanesque and Byzantine art he studied while in Paris on the G.I. Bill. The Blanton launched a $15 million campaign to realize the project, a number that eventually grew to $23 million. Austin opened February 18, 2018, with a ceremony featuring University of Texas at Austin President Greg Fenves, Austin Mayor Steve Adler, and museum director Simone Wicha.

=== SoundSpace ===
SoundSpace is a hybrid performance series that takes place at the Blanton three times per year. The series features simultaneous, interdisciplinary performances throughout the museum and has received awards from the Austin Critic's Table, the Austin Chronicle, and profiled at the annual SXSW Festival. SoundSpace has featured Graham Reynolds, Adrian Quesada, Thor Harris, and Panoramic Voices, among others. The series is directed by Austin artist Steve Parker and underwritten by local arts patron Mike Chesser.
