= Natalie Frank =

American artist

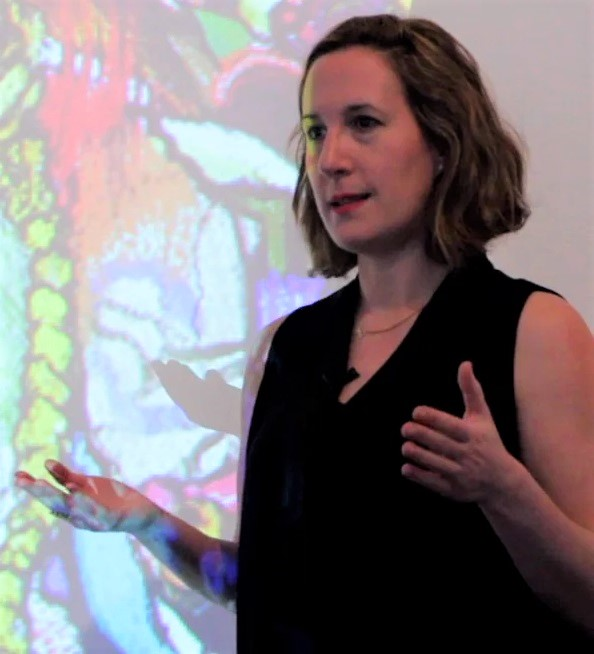
- Frank in 2015
- Born: Natalie Frank; 1980 (age 45–46); Austin, Texas, United States
- Education: Yale University, Columbia University

Natalie Frank (born 1980) is an American artist. Currently living and working in New York City, her work deals with themes of power, sexuality, gender, feminism, and identity. Although Frank is best known as a painter, she has also explored other mediums including sculpture and drawing. Her most famous works are a series of drawings of the original, unsanitized Brothers Grimm fairy tales.

== Personal life and education ==
Frank was born in Austin, Texas in 1980. Growing, up Frank enjoyed reading and was very imaginative. At the age of ten, Frank moved from Austin to Dallas where she lived and attended school for the next eight years. Frank was a high school National Merit Finalist, but was denied a place in the National Honor Society due to conflicts with school administrators over her drawings from life. Frank earned her BA in Studio Art from Yale University in 2002, and her MFA in Visual Arts from Columbia University in 2006. In 2003, Frank earned a Fulbright Scholarship to the National Academy of Fine Art in Oslo, Norway. She has also studied at the L'École nationale supérieure des Beaux-Arts in Paris in 2001, and the Florence Academy of Art in 2000, among others.

In 2013, Frank was diagnosed with a lack of stereoscopic vision—she has limited depth perception and needs corrective lenses, which the artist credits as the inspiration to create 3D figures. Artists, Rembrandt and Pablo Picasso, both had the same eye condition.

== Career ==
Frank's work is marked by disturbing, explicit, and grotesque subject matter that revolves around themes including women, sexuality, gender, violence, and humanity. She often blurs the line between reality and fantasy, and the artist notes that she wants her work to be located on the edge of Magical Realism and the real world, the former in literature being a major source of inspiration for Frank. With oil on canvas and mixed media making up the bulk of her work, Frank is praised for her classical techniques that elicit references to the fleshy figures of Francis Bacon. Artists who she credits as inspirations include Edgar Degas, Diego Velázquez, Käthe Kollwitz, Francisco Goya, and Robert Gober.

In 2006, while she was still completing her masters at Columbia, Frank had her first solo show at the Briggs Robinson Gallery; art critic Charlie Finch notes that the gallery's director, Bettina Smith, was looking for an upcoming art world star and curated the resulting show of Frank's work. In 2013, Frank made her West Coast solo show debut at ACME Los Angeles. Titled "The Scene of Disappearance," the show included works depicting home life through intimate and grotesque portraits of bodies set in interior spaces, blurring the line between abstraction and realism. Reoccurring themes in the show included dreams, the subconscious, alienation, and distress. This exhibition also marked the first time Frank worked with collage.

Frank has had solo exhibitions at Rhona Hoffman Gallery, Mitchell-Innes & Nash, Arndt & Partner in Zürich, and at Fredericks Freiser. Her work is included in multiple museum collections, including the Whitney Museum of American Art, the Brooklyn Museum, and the Blanton Museum of Art. Frank's work was included in the 2022 exhibition Women Painting Women at the Modern Art Museum of Fort Worth.

== The Brothers Grimm ==
In 2011, artist Paula Rego suggested that Frank read the original, unsanitized versions of the Brothers Grimm fairy tales, noting that the series embodied many of the themes present in Frank's work. Frank was intrigued, and spent the next three years creating 75 gouache and chalk pastel drawings of 36 of the original stories, including well known tales including Rapunzel and Cinderella, as well as lesser known ones like The Lettuce Donkey. The series marks the first time Frank drew inspiration from literature and is one of the only complex, systematic examination of the original tales by a contemporary artist.

Frank refers to the series as "drawings" instead of "illustrations" to demonstrate her interpretation of the series through a feminist lens. To accentuate the dark nature of the tales, Frank uses bright, often neon colors. Instead of working from life, Frank uses photographs of models that often include family and friends—a portrait of her father appears in "All Fur," and her grandfather's face floats next to the headless body of Bluebeard in one of the series' drawings.

In 2015, the Drawing Center opened an exhibition of twenty-five of the Brothers Grimm drawings, organized by senior curator Claire Gilman, garnering reviews in Artforum, Artinfo, The Wall Street Journal, the Financial Times, Interview Magazine, and Vulture, among others. An expanded version of the exhibition opened at the Blanton Museum of Art in Austin, Texas in July 2015.

Frank also created an illustrated book of the Grimms Fairy Tales after reaching out to prominent Grimm scholar Jack Zipes during research for the drawing series. Included are thirty-six stories, beginning with "The Frog King" and ending with "The Golden Key," as almost every iteration of the series throughout the years has done. In addition to the illustrated stories, art historian Linda Nochlin, scholar Jack Zipes, director Julie Taymor, and curator Claire Gilman contributed scholarly essays to the volume.

== Solo exhibitions ==
- Natalie Frank: Unbound, Madison Museum of Contemporary Art, Madison, Wisconsin (June 5–October 3, 2021); traveled to Kemper Museum of Contemporary Art, Kansas City, Missouri (January 28 – May 15, 2022)
- Natalie Frank: The Brothers Grimm, Blanton Museum of Art at University of Texas, Austin (July 11–November 15, 2015)
- Interiors and Openings, Rhona Hoffman Gallery, Chicago, Illinois (September–October, 2014)
- The Scene of a Disappearance, ACME, Los Angeles, CA (October 19 – November 16, 2013)
- The Governed and the Governors, Fredericks Freiser, New York, NY (October 4 – November 3, 2012)
- My Noon, My Midnight, My Talk, My Song, Space SBH, St. Barth's French West Indies (February 16 – March 7, 2012)
- Desire Comes Later, Arndt & Partner, Zürich (March 7–April 12, 2008)
- Where She Stops, Mitchell-Innes & Nash, New York City (September 7 – October 13, 2007)
- Unveiling, Briggs Robinson Gallery, New York City (January 26–March 11, 2006)
