= Mari Carmen Ramírez =

Author, curator, art historian

- Born: April 1, 1955 (age 70); San Juan, Puerto Rico
- Education: University of Puerto Rico; Ph.D.University of Chicago, 1988
- Occupation: Museum curator
- Known for: Wortham Curator of Latin American Art at Museum of Fine Arts, Houston
- Spouse: Héctor Olea

Mari Carmen Ramírez-Garcia is an American art historian, art curator, and the Wortham Curator of Latin American art at the Museum of Fine Arts, Houston.

== Early life and education ==
Ramírez was born and raised in San Juan, Puerto Rico, where her mother was a medical researcher and her father a civil engineer. She received undergraduate education at the University of Puerto Rico. Awarded a master's degree in 1978, she earned a doctorate in 1988 at the University of Chicago, where she wrote a dissertation on Mexican muralists of the 1920s.

== Career ==
Ramirez began her career in Puerto Rico, where she served as assistant director of the Ponce Museum of Art, and director of the Museo de Antropología, Historia y Arte at the University of Puerto Rico Rio Piedras campus from 1985 to 1988. While at the University of Texas at Austin from 1989 to 2000, she established the Latin American program within the Jack C. Blanton Museum of Art and was recognized as the first curator of Latin American art in the United States. She joined the Museum of Fine Arts, Houston in May 2001. With MFAH director Peter C. Marzio, she founded the International Center for the Arts of the Americas that same year. Time magazine named her one of the most influential Hispanic people in the United States.

== Other activities ==
Ramírez served on the jury that selected Carlos Martiel for the El Museo del Barrio’s inaugural $50,000 Maestro Dobel Tequila Latinx Art Prize in 2023.
