= Austin (building) =

Building by Ellsworth Kelly

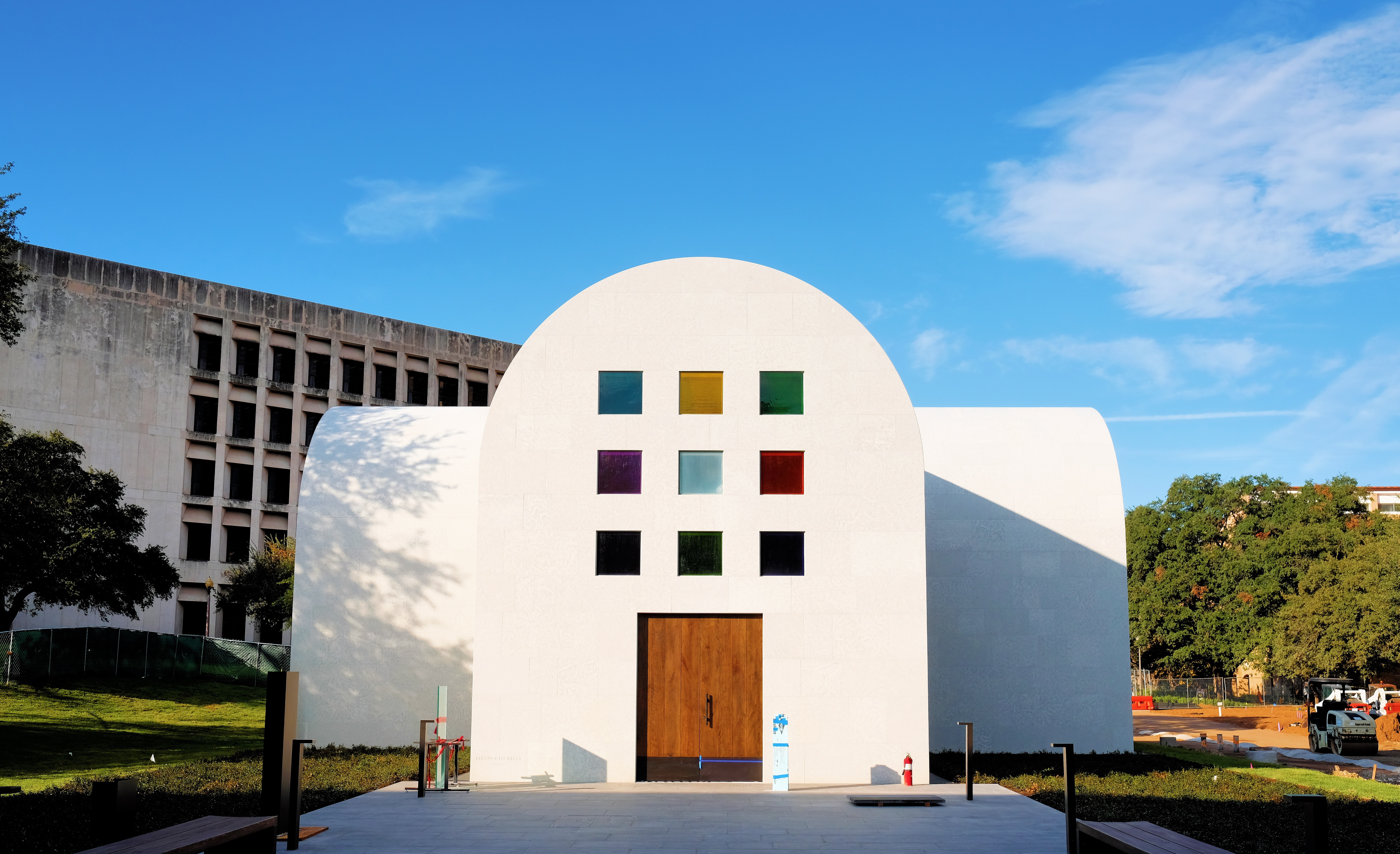
- Austin entrance
- Artist: Ellsworth Kelly
- Completion date: 1 February 2018
- Type: Building
- Medium: stone, glass, wood
- Dimensions: 60 ft. x 73 ft. x 26 ft. 4 in.
- Location: Blanton Museum of Art; Austin, TX; 30.28170°N 97.737815°W
- Owner: Blanton Museum of Art, University of Texas at Austin

Austin is an immersive work of art and architecture designed by artist Ellsworth Kelly and built on the grounds of the Blanton Museum of Art in Austin, Texas, USA. The building is a permanent installation and part of the museum's permanent collection.

Kelly's Austin relates to the tradition of modernist artist-commissioned buildings that includes the Rothko Chapel in Houston, Philip Johnson's Thanks-Giving Square chapel in Dallas, and the Matisse Chapel in Vence.

== History ==
The initial conception of Austin was the television producer and art collector Douglas S. Cramer's request to Ellsworth Kelly to design an architectural pavilion on his vineyard near Santa Barbara, California. Kelly designed the structure that would later become Austin, intending it for Cramer's estate, but the plans eventually fell through.

In January 2015, Kelly gave to the Blanton Museum the design concept for a 2,715 square feet (252.2 m^{2}) stone building that he subsequently named Austin. Kelly said that the design of the building was inspired by Romanesque and Byzantine art he studied while in Paris on the G.I. Bill. Following Kelly's gift, the Blanton launched a $15 million campaign to realize the project. This number eventually grew to $23 million.

The building was opened to the public February 18, 2018.

A companion exhibition of Kelly's prints, sketches, and sculptures was displayed February 18–April 29, 2018 at the Blanton to trace the evolution of four core motifs throughout his career: spectrum, black and white, color grid, and totem.

== Construction and design ==
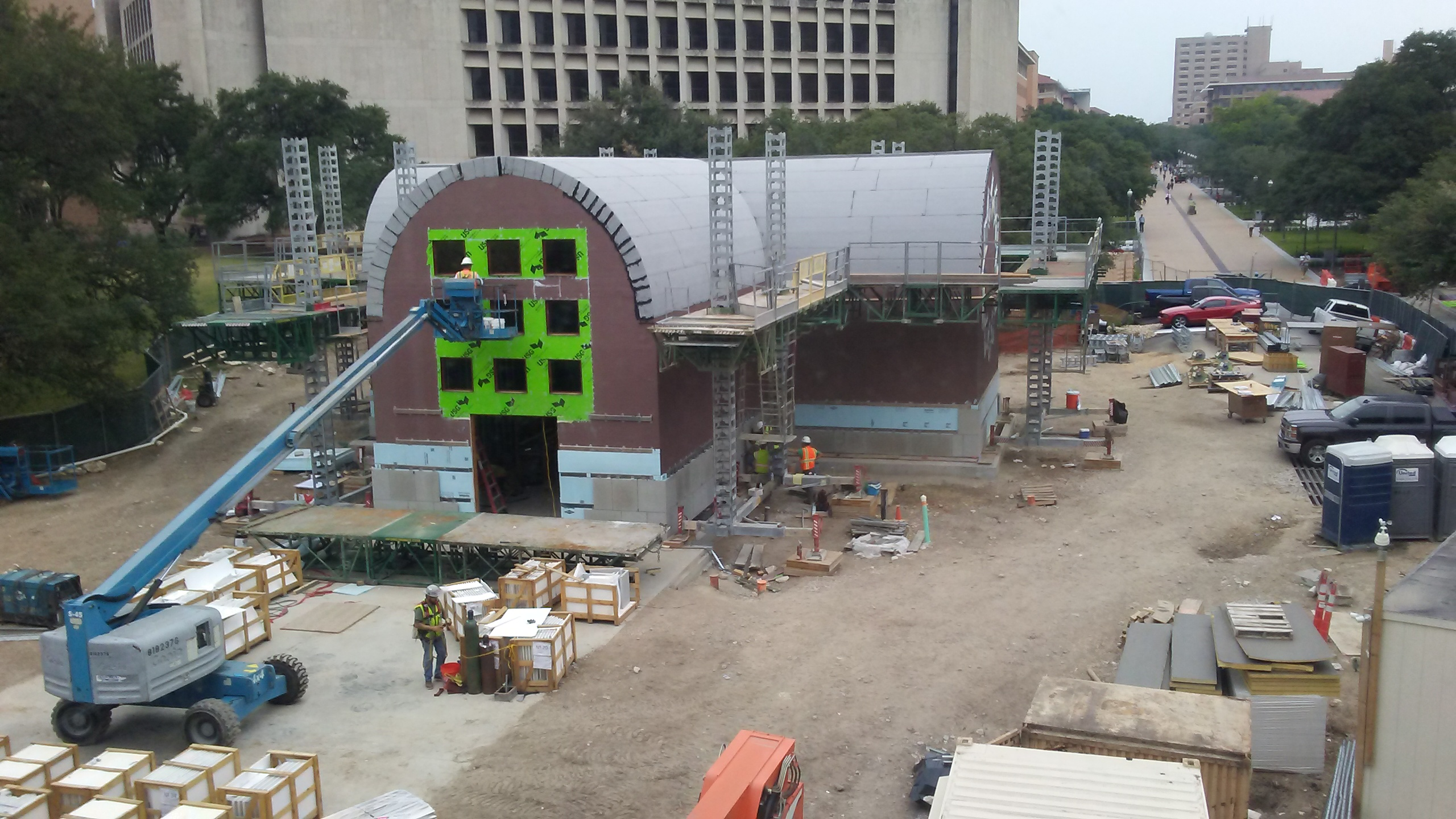
Austin under construction in May, 2017; photo by Steven Saylor

The design-build team that realized the project was Overland Partners and Linbeck Group.

The structure is clad with 1,569 limestone panels from Alicante, Spain. The interior stone flooring and plaza flooring is granite from Georgia, United States. The entry door is made from a native Texas live oak tree from the site of the Dell Medical School. Austin has thirty-three mouth-blown-glass windows fabricated by Franz Mayer & Co. of Munich, Germany installed on three walls in "color grid", "starburst" and "tumbling squares" motifs.

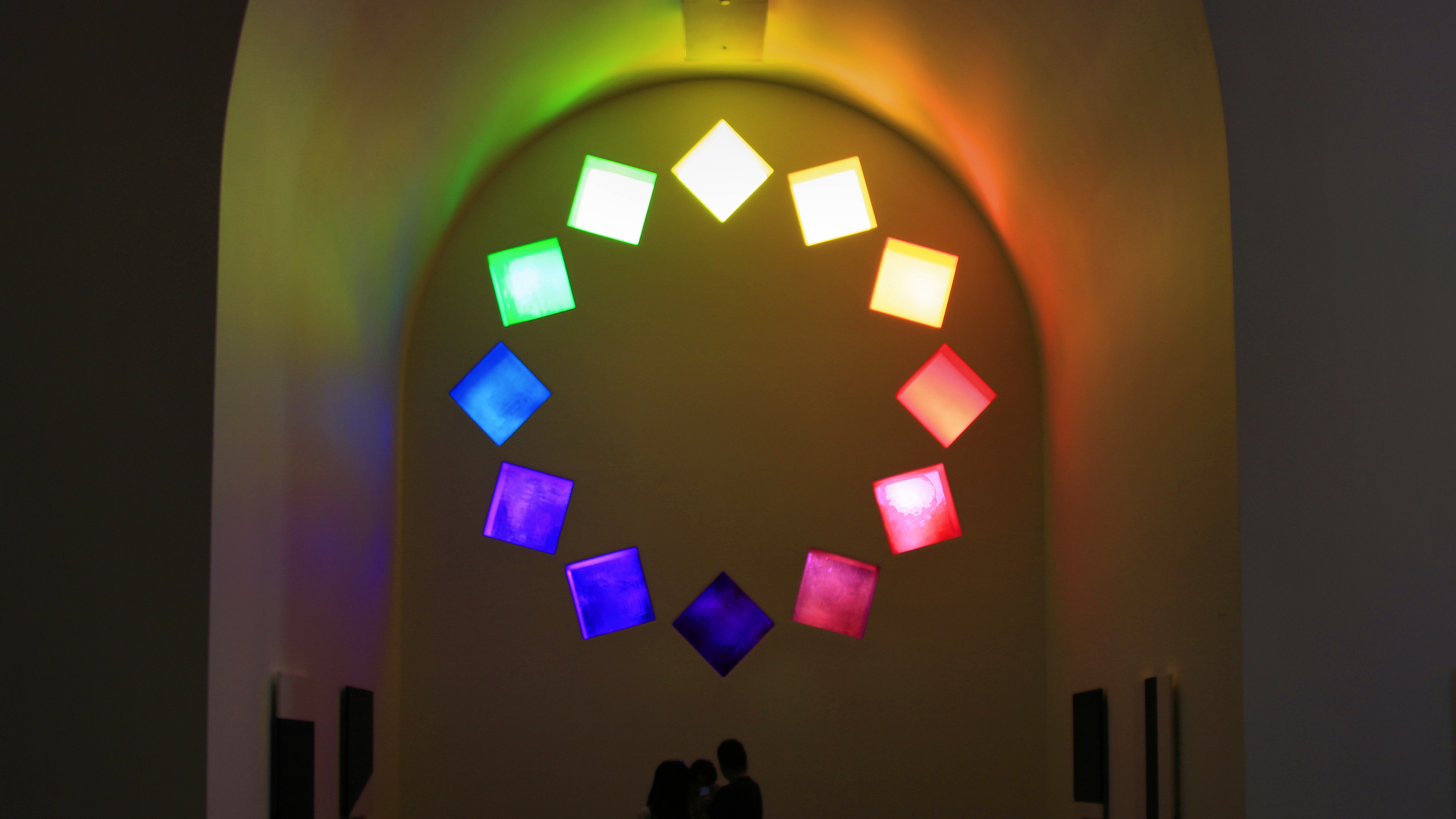
The "tumbling squares" motif as seen from the interior of Austin.

There are fourteen black and white marble panels on the interior walls of Austin that each measure 40" x 40". The black marble is from Belgium, and the white marble is from Carrara, Italy. Kelly experimented with a variety of composition for these simple panels, inspired by the Stations of the Cross. There is also an 18-foot-tall totem in Austin's interior, which is salvaged redwood.

Although it was inspired by church art and architecture,

Kelly was a lifelong atheist. When he set out to create his own version of a chapel, he omitted explicit religious imagery and chose not to have it consecrated. In the end, Kelly's Austin—the prosaic title he gave the work—is a chapel-like form stripped of any holy narrative.

== Reception ==
The Austin American-Statesman reported that "Kelly's temple of light and color...received almost universal acclaim."

M.H. Miller in The New York Times wrote that Austin

is very much the culmination of Kelly's oeuvre, not just a summation of his work's themes but his masterpiece, the grandest exploration of pure color and form in a seven-decade career spent testing the boundaries of both. It is also the kind of ambitious fantasy that artists rarely get to execute...There are precedents for Austin... But it's possible that no contemporary artwork of this scale by a major artist has matched its creator's initial ambitions so perfectly as Kelly's Austin.

== Gallery ==
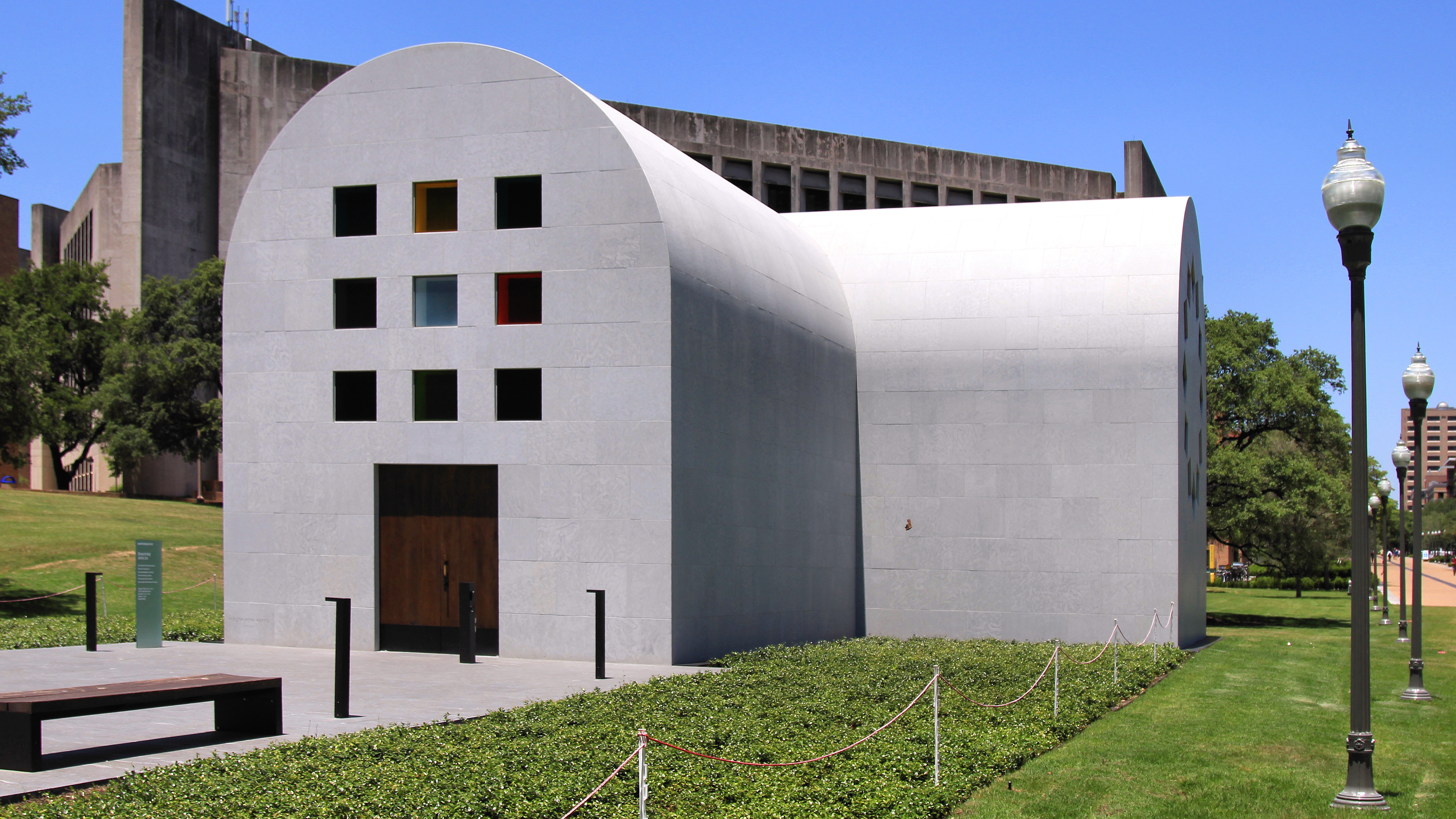

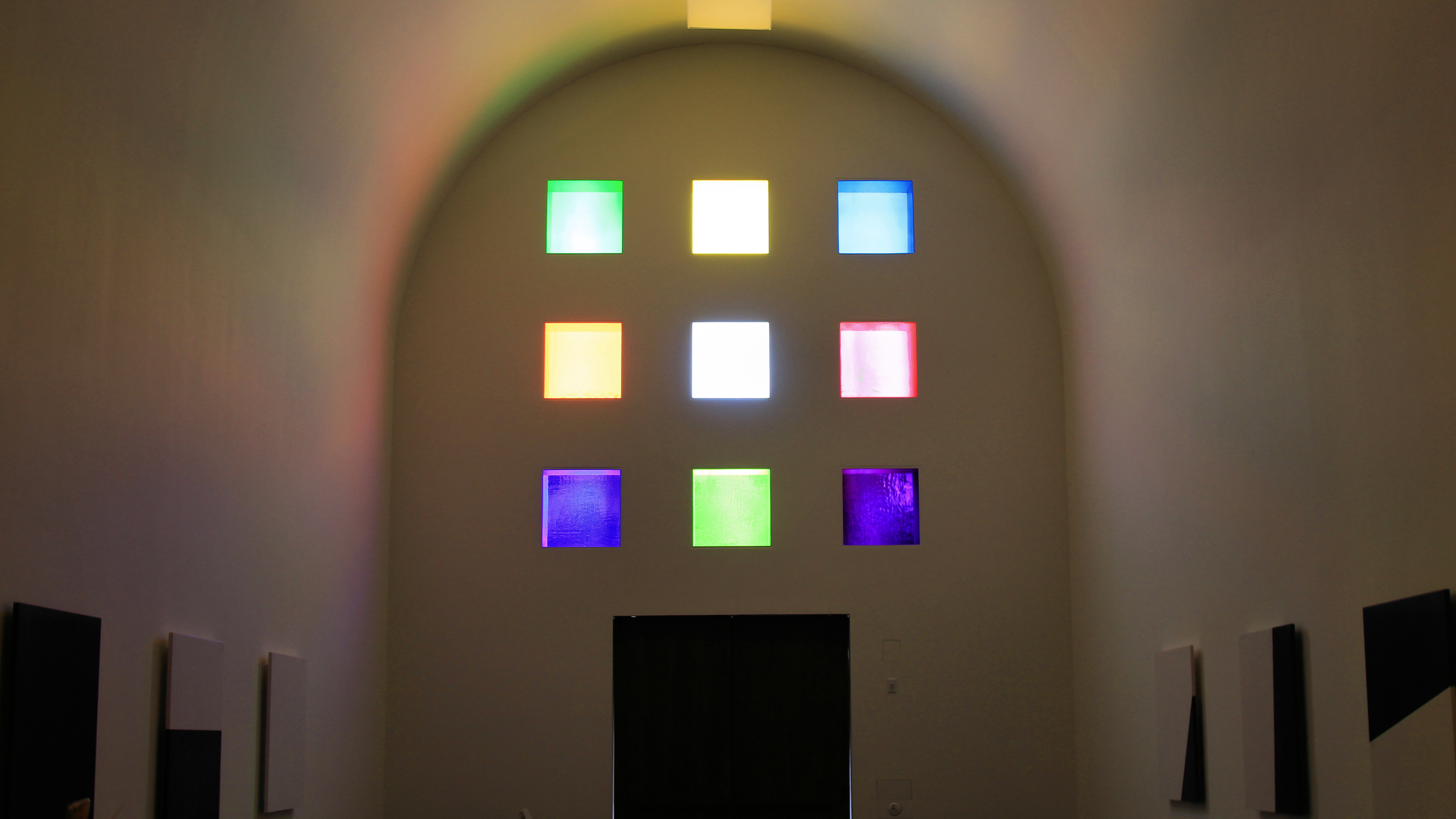

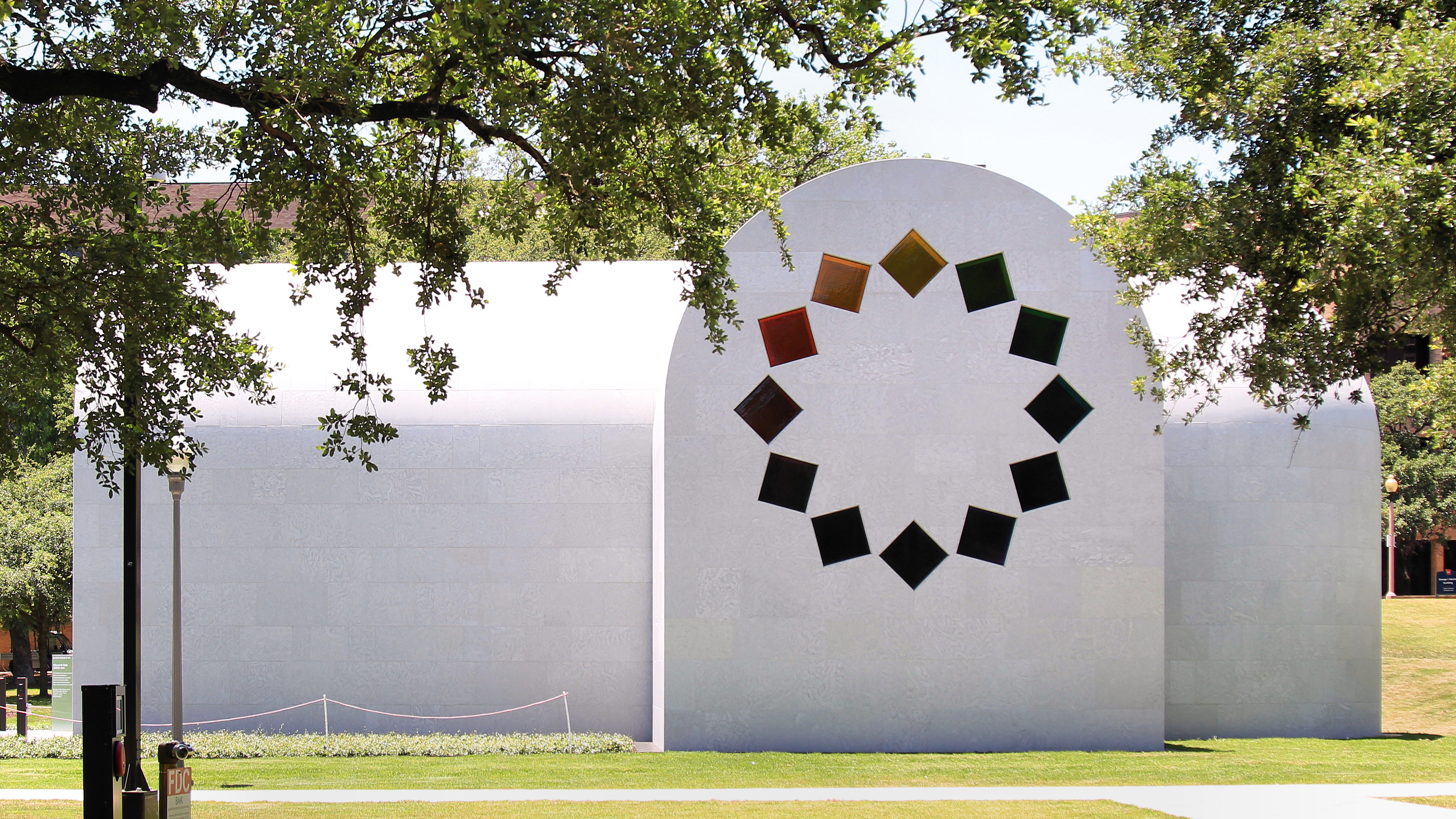

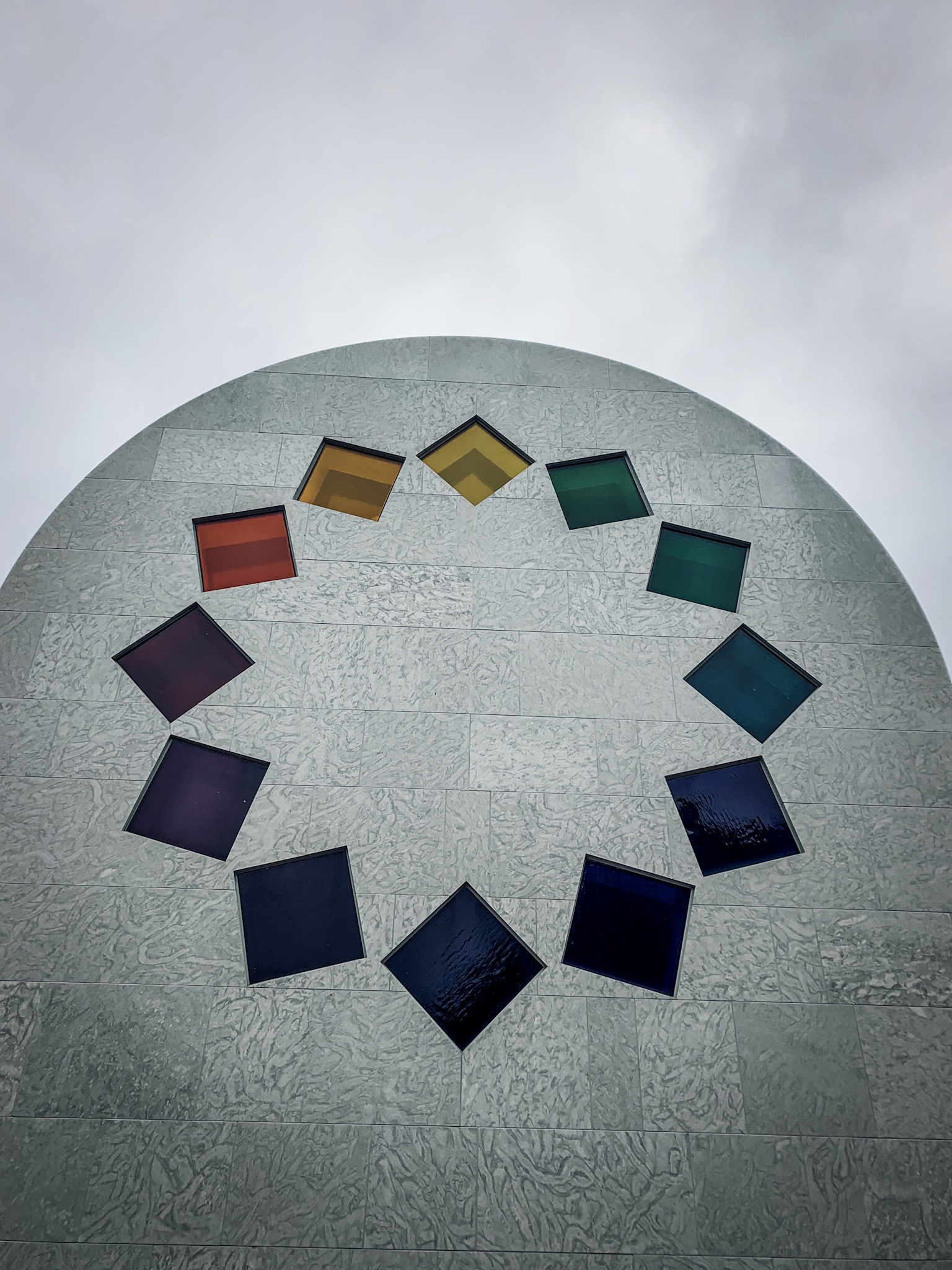

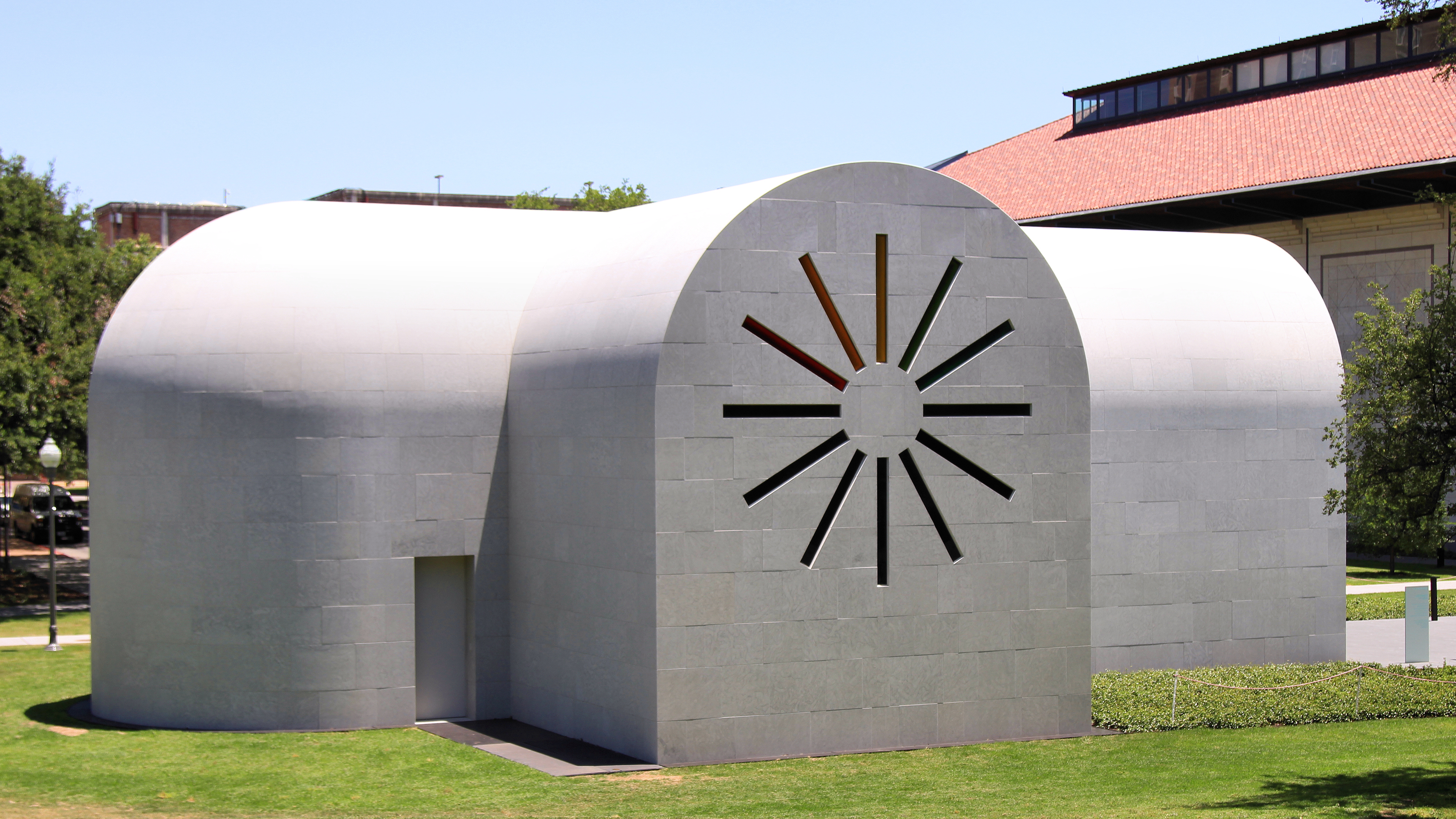

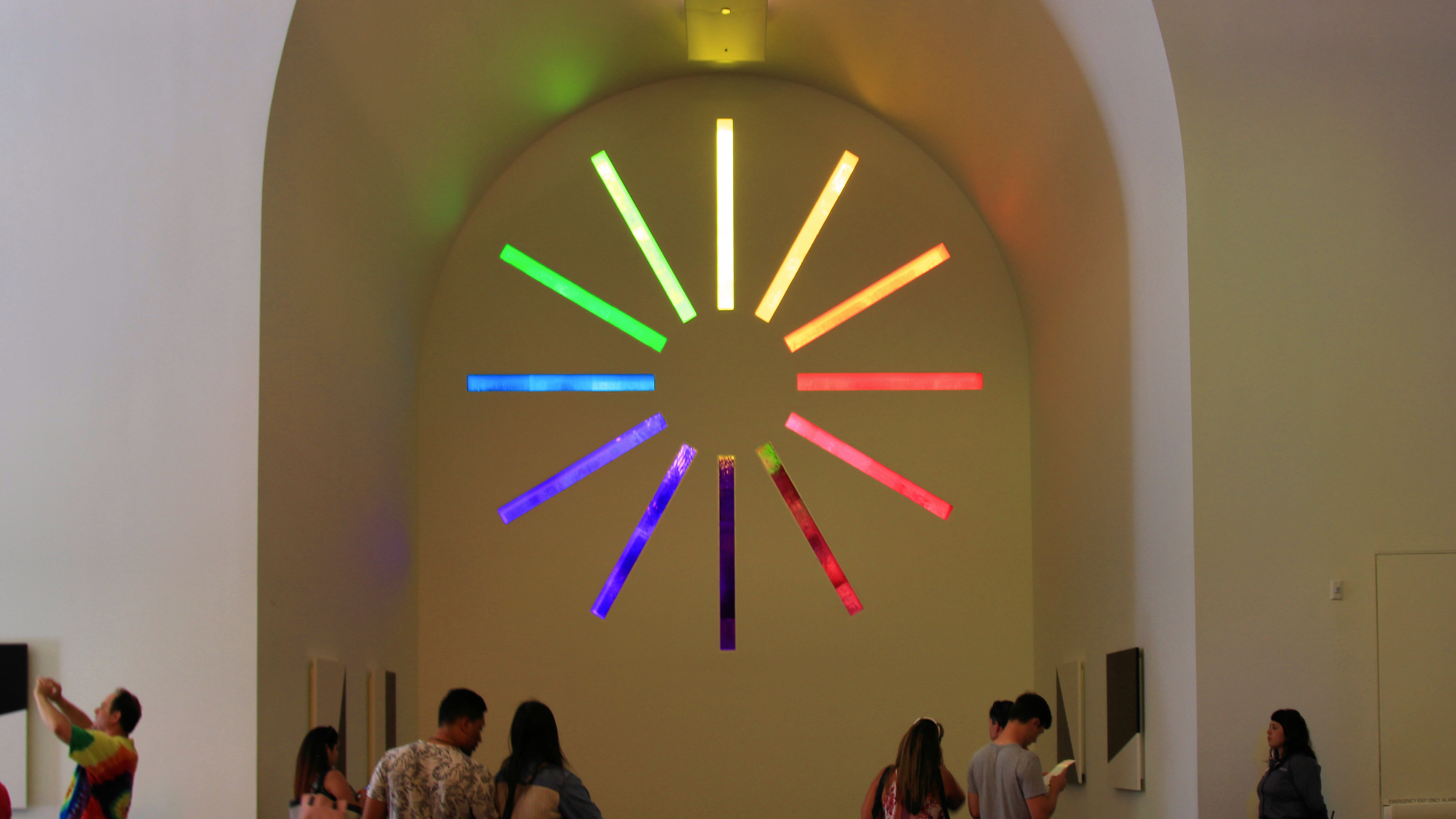

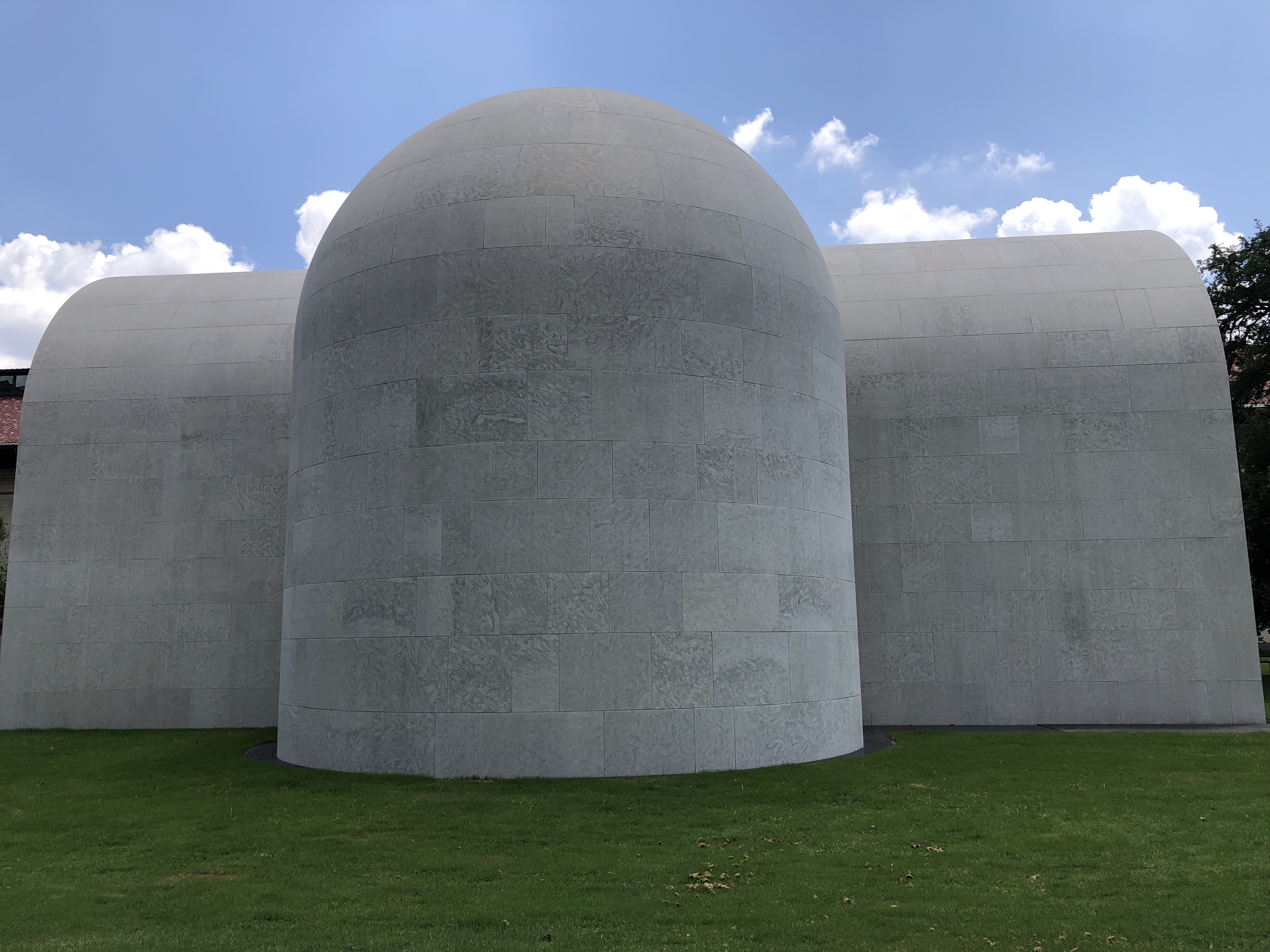

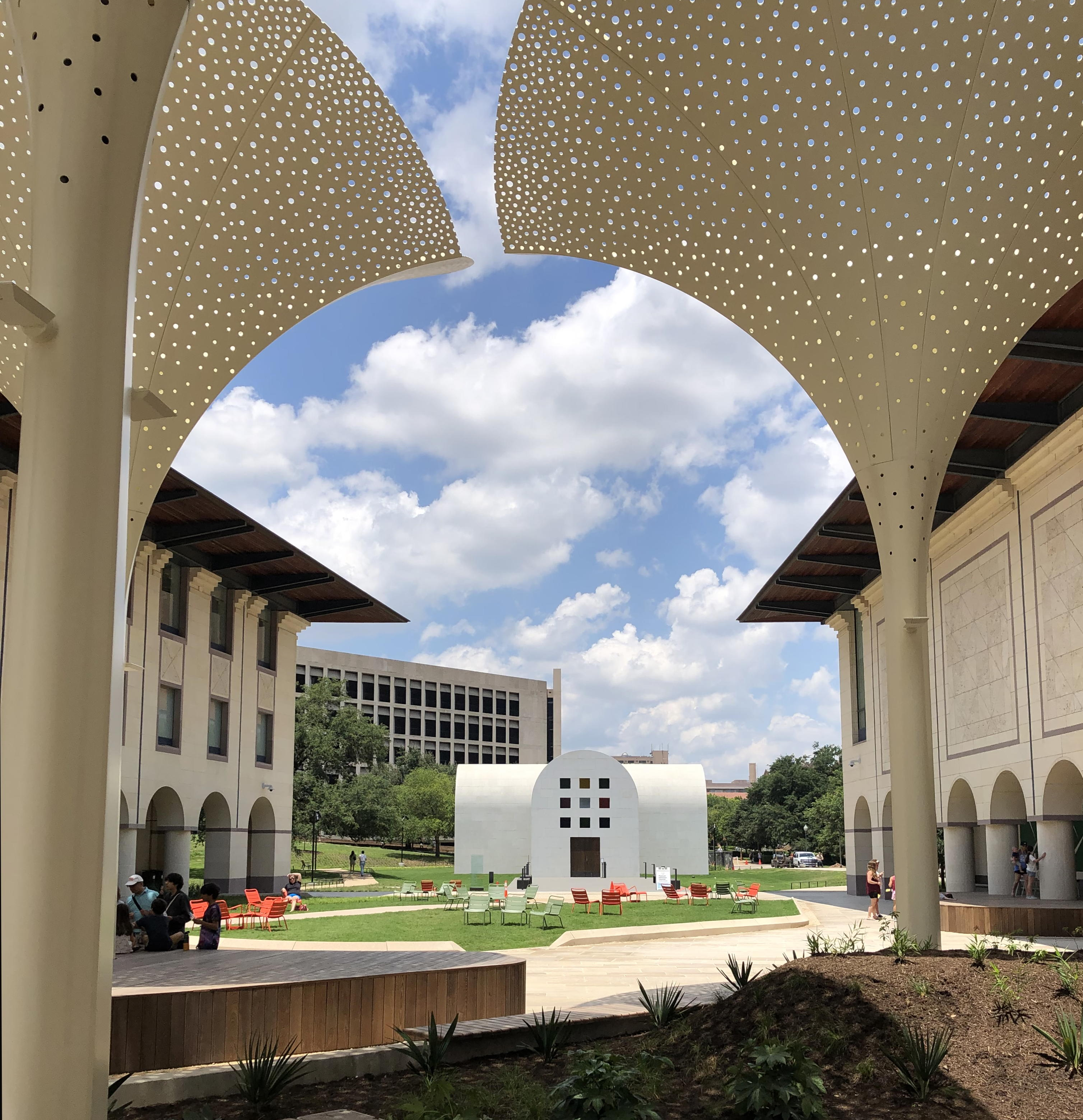
