= Ellsworth Kelly =

American painter, sculptor, and printmaker

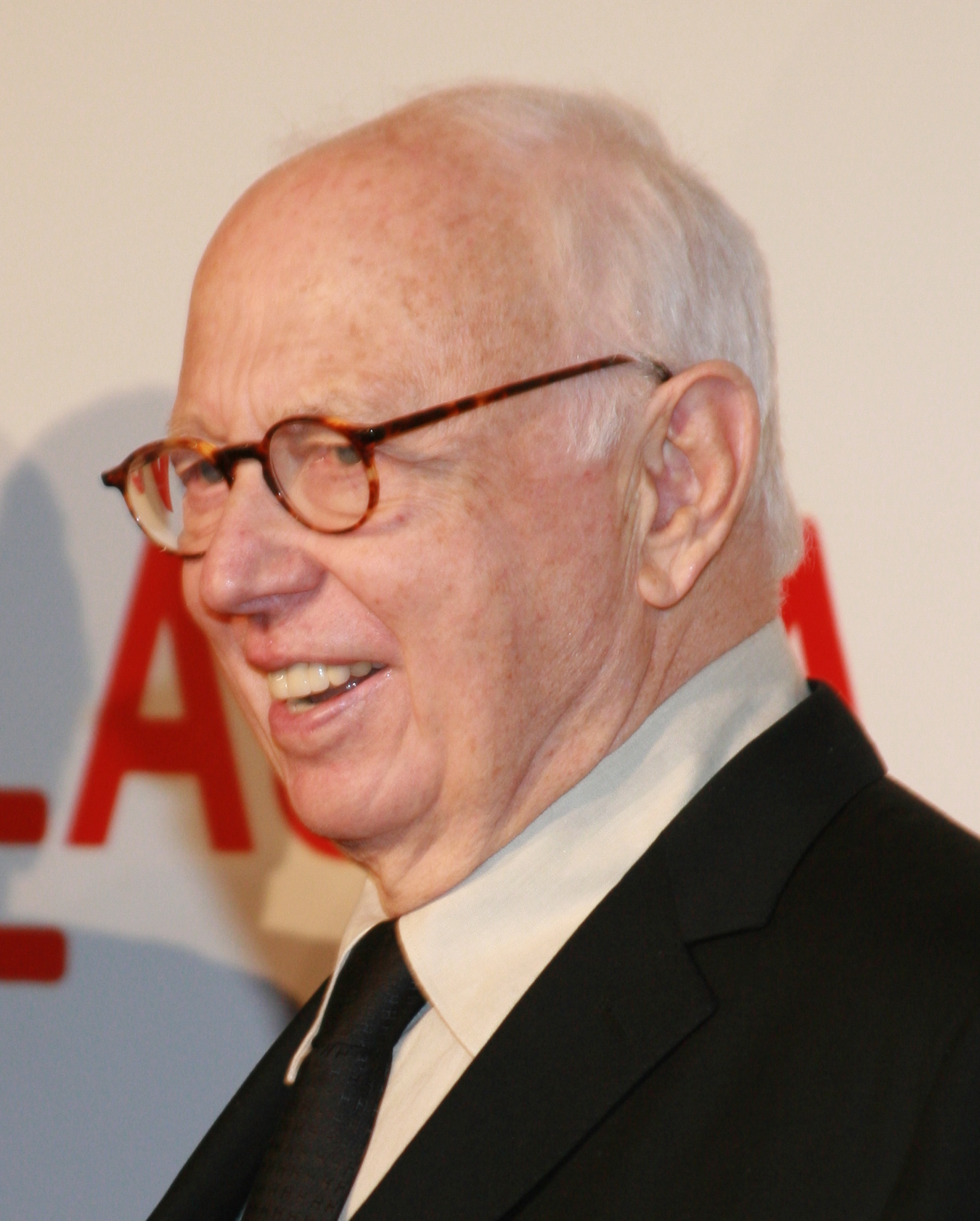
- Ellsworth Kelly arrives at LACMA's gala opening of the Broad Contemporary Art Museum on February 9, 2008, in Los Angeles
- Born: May 31, 1923; Newburgh, New York, U.S.
- Died: December 27, 2015 (aged 92); Spencertown, New York, U.S.
- Education: Pratt Institute; École nationale supérieure des Beaux-Arts; School of the Museum of Fine Arts, Boston
- Known for: Painting, sculpture, printmaking
- Awards: Praemium Imperiale

Ellsworth Kelly (May 31, 1923 – December 27, 2015) was an American painter, sculptor, and printmaker associated with hard-edge painting, Color field painting and minimalism. His works demonstrate unassuming techniques emphasizing line, color and form, similar to the work of John McLaughlin and Kenneth Noland. Kelly often employed bright colors. He lived and worked in Spencertown, New York.

== Childhood ==
Kelly was born the second son of three to Allan Howe Kelly and Florence Rose Elizabeth (Githens) Kelly in Newburgh, New York, approximately 60 miles north of New York City. His father was an insurance company executive of Scots-Irish and German descent. His mother was a former schoolteacher of Welsh and Pennsylvania German stock. His family moved from Newburgh to Oradell, New Jersey, a town of nearly 7,500 people. His family lived near the Oradell Reservoir, where his paternal grandmother introduced him to ornithology when he was eight or nine years old.

There he developed his passion for form and color. John James Audubon had a particularly strong influence on Kelly's work throughout his career. Author Eugene Goossen speculated that the two- and three-color paintings (such as Three Panels: Red Yellow Blue, I 1963) for which Kelly is so well known can be traced to his bird watching and his study of the two- and three-color birds he saw so frequently at an early age. Kelly said he was often alone as a young boy and became somewhat of a "loner." He had a slight stutter that persisted into his teenage years.

== Education ==
Kelly attended public school, where art classes stressed materials and sought to develop the "artistic imagination." This curriculum was typical of the broader trend in schooling that had emerged from the Progressive education theories promulgated by the Columbia University's Teacher's College, at which the American modernist painter Arthur Wesley Dow had taught. Although his parents were reluctant to support Kelly's art training, his school teacher, Dorothy Lange Opsut, encouraged him to go further. As his parents would pay only for technical training, Kelly studied first at Pratt Institute in Brooklyn, which he attended from 1941 until he was inducted into the Army on New Year's Day 1943.

== Military ==
Upon entering the U.S. military service in 1943 Kelly requested to be assigned to the 603rd Engineers Camouflage Battalion, which took many artists. He was inducted at Fort Dix, New Jersey and sent to Camp Hale, Colorado, where he trained with mountain ski troops. He had never skied before. Six to eight weeks later, he was transferred to Fort Meade, Maryland. During World War II, he served with other artists and designers in the Ghost Army, a United States Army deception unit that used inflatable tanks, trucks and other elements of subterfuge to mislead the Axis forces about the direction and disposition of Allied forces. Before the unit went to Europe, he experimented with camouflage techniques and helped to silk-screen posters that introduced infantry units to basic camouflage principles. Once in Europe he spent most of his official time behind the steering wheel of a truck.

Like many other Ghost Army artists, he did his share of sketches and paintings while in the European theatre, and he appreciated the exposure to European architecture and landscape (and his brief visit to Paris). His exposure to military camouflage during the time he served became part of his basic art training. Kelly served with the unit from 1943 until the end of the European phase of the war. The Ghost Army received the Congressional Gold Medal on March 21, 2024, at a ceremony in Emancipation Hall in the U.S. Capitol.

== Postwar education ==
Kelly used the G.I. Bill to study from 1946 to 1947 at the School of the Museum of Fine Arts, Boston, where he took advantage of the museum's collections, and then at the École nationale supérieure des Beaux-Arts in Paris. While in Boston, he exhibited in his first group show at the Boris Mirski Gallery and taught art classes at the Norfolk House Center in Roxbury. While in Paris, Kelly established his aesthetic. He attended classes infrequently, but immersed himself in the rich artistic resources of the French capital. He had heard a lecture by Max Beckmann on the French artist Paul Cézanne in 1948 and moved to Paris that year. There he encountered fellow Americans John Cage and Merce Cunningham, experimenting in music and dance, respectively; the French Surrealist artist Jean Arp; and the abstract sculptor Constantin Brâncuși, whose simplification of natural forms had a lasting effect on him. The experience of visiting artists such as Alberto Magnelli, Francis Picabia, Alberto Giacometti and Georges Vantongerloo in their studios was transformative.

== Career ==
After being abroad for six years Kelly's French was still poor and he had sold only one painting. In 1953 he was evicted from his studio and he returned to America the following year. He had become interested after reading a review of an Ad Reinhardt exhibit, an artist whose work he felt his work related to. Upon his return to New York, he found the art world "very tough." Although Kelly is now considered an essential innovator and contributor to the American art movement, it was hard for many to find the connection between Kelly's art and the dominant stylistic trends. In May 1956 Kelly had his first New York City exhibition at Betty Parsons' gallery. His art was considered more European than was popular in New York at the time. He showed again at her gallery in the fall of 1957. Three of his pieces: Atlantic, Bar, and Painting in Three Panels, were selected for and shown at the Whitney Museum of American Art's exhibit, "Young America 1957". His pieces were considered radically different from the other twenty-nine artists’ works. Painting in Three Panels, for example, was particularly noted; at the time critics questioned his creating a work from three canvases. For instance, Michael Plante said that, more often than not, Kelly's multiple-panel pieces were cramped because of installation restrictions, which reduced the interaction between the pieces and the architecture of the room.

Kelly eventually moved away from Coenties Slip, where he had sometimes shared a studio with fellow artist and friend Agnes Martin, to the ninth floor of the high-rise studio/co-op Hotel des Artistes at 27 West 67th Street.

Kelly left New York City for Spencertown in 1970 and was joined there by his partner, photographer Jack Shear, in 1984. From 2001 until his death Kelly worked in a 20,000-square-feet studio in Spencertown reconfigured and extended by the architect Richard Gluckman; the original studio had been designed by Schenectady-based architects Werner Feibes and James Schmitt in exchange for a site-specific painting Kelly created for them. Kelly and Shear moved in 2005 to the residence they shared until the painter's death, a wood-clad Colonial house built around 1815. Shear serves as the director of the Ellsworth Kelly Foundation. In 2015, Kelly gave his building design concept for a site of contemplation to the Blanton Museum of Art at the University of Texas in Austin. Titled Austin, the 2,715-square-foot stone building—which features colored glass windows, a totemic wood sculpture and black-and-white marble panels—is the only building Kelly designed and is his most monumental work. Austin, which Kelly designed thirty years prior, opened in February 2018.

Kelly died in Spencertown, New York on December 27, 2015, aged 92.

=== Painting ===
While in Paris, Kelly had continued to paint the figure but by May 1949, he made his first abstract paintings. Observing how light dispersed on the surface of water, he painted Seine (1950), made of black and white rectangles arranged by chance. In 1951 he started a series of eight collages titled Spectrum Colors Arranged by Chance I to VIII. He created it by using numbered slips of paper; each referred to a colour, one of eighteen different hues to be placed on a grid 40 inches by 40 inches. Each of the eight collages employed a different process.

Ellsworth Kelly, The Meschers, 1951, oil on canvas, 59 × 59 inches, Museum of Modern Art. Kelly was a pioneer of hard-edge painting in the 1940s and 1950s.

Kelly's discovery in 1952 of Monet's late work infused him with a new freedom of painterly expression: he began working in extremely large formats and explored the concepts of seriality and monochrome paintings. As a painter he worked from then on in an exclusively abstract mode. By the late 1950s, his painting stressed shape and planar masses (often assuming non-rectilinear formats). His work of this period also provided a useful bridge from the vanguard American geometric abstraction of the 1930s and early 1940s to the minimalism and reductive art of the mid-1960s and 1970s. Kelly's relief painting Blue Tablet (1962), for example, was included in the seminal 1963 exhibition, Toward a New Abstraction, at the Jewish Museum.

During the 1960s he started working with irregularly angled canvases. Yellow Piece (1966), the artist's first shaped canvas, represents Kelly's pivotal break with the rectangular support and his redefinition of painting's figure/ground relationship. With its curved corners and single, all-encompassing color, the canvas itself becomes the composition, transforming the wall behind it into the picture's ground.

Color Panels for a Large Wall (1978) at the National Gallery of Art in 2022

In the 1970s he added curved shapes to his repertoire. Green White (1968) marks the debut appearance of the triangle in Kelly's oeuvre, a shape that reoccurs throughout his career; the painting is composed of two distinct, shaped monochromatic canvases, which are installed on top of each other: a large-scale, inverted, green trapezoid is positioned vertically above a smaller white triangle, forming a new geometric composition.

After leaving New York City for Spencertown in 1970, he rented a former theater in the nearby town of Chatham, allowing to work in a studio more spacious than any he had previously occupied. After working there for a year, Kelly embarked on a series of 14 paintings that would become the Chatham Series. Each work takes the form of an inverted ell, and is made of two joined canvases, each canvas a monochrome of a different color. The works vary in proportion and palette from one to the next; careful attention was paid to the size of each panel and the color selected in order to achieve balance and contrast between the two.

A larger series of twelve works which Kelly started in 1972 and did not complete until 1983, Gray was originally conceived as an anti-war statement and is drained of color. In 1979 he used curves in two-colour paintings made of separate panels.

In later paintings, Kelly distilled his palette and introduced new forms. In each work, he started with a rectangular canvas which he carefully painted with many coats of white paint; a shaped canvas, mostly painted black, is placed on top.

In reference to his own work Kelly said in an interview in 1996: "I think what we all want from art is a sense of fixity, a sense of opposing the chaos of daily living. This an illusion, of course. Canvas rots. Paint changes color. But you keep trying to freeze the world as if you could make it last forever. In a sense, what I've tried to capture is the reality of flux, to keep art an open, incomplete situation, to get at the rapture of seeing."

Kelly commented "I realized I didn't want to compose pictures … I wanted to find them. I felt that my vision was choosing things out there in the world and presenting them. To me the investigation of perception was of the greatest interest. There was so much to see, and it all looked fantastic to me."

=== Lithographs and drawings ===
Kelly tendered drawings of plants and flowers from the late 1940s on. Ailanthus (1948) is the first plant drawing that he executed in Boston, Hyacinth (1949) was the first one he did when he was in Paris. Beginning in 1949, while living in Paris (and influenced in this choice of subject by Henri Matisse and Jean Arp) he began to draw simple plant and seaweed forms. The plant studies are, for the most part, contour drawings of leaves, stems and flowers done in clean strokes of pencil or pen and centered on the page.

He took up printmaking in a concerted fashion in the mid-1960s, when he produced his Suite of Twenty-Seven Lithographs (1964–66) with Maeght Éditeur in Paris. It was then that he created his first group of plant lithographs. From 1970 on he collaborated primarily with Gemini G.E.L. His initial series of 28 transfer lithographs, entitled Suite of Plant Lithographs, marked the beginning of a corpus that would grow to 72 prints and countless drawings of foliage. In 1971, he completed four editions of prints and an edition of the multiple Mirrored Concorde at Gemini G.E.L. His Purple/Red/Gray/Orange (1988), at eighteen feet in length, may be the largest single-sheet lithograph ever made. His recent editions, The River, States of the River and River II, reflect the fascination with water Kelly possessed since his early days in Paris. In 1975, Kelly was the first artist to exhibit for the Wadsworth Atheneum Museum of Art's MATRIX series. The exhibition displayed Kelly's Corn Stalk drawings series and two of his 1974 cor-ten steel sculptures.

=== Sculpture ===
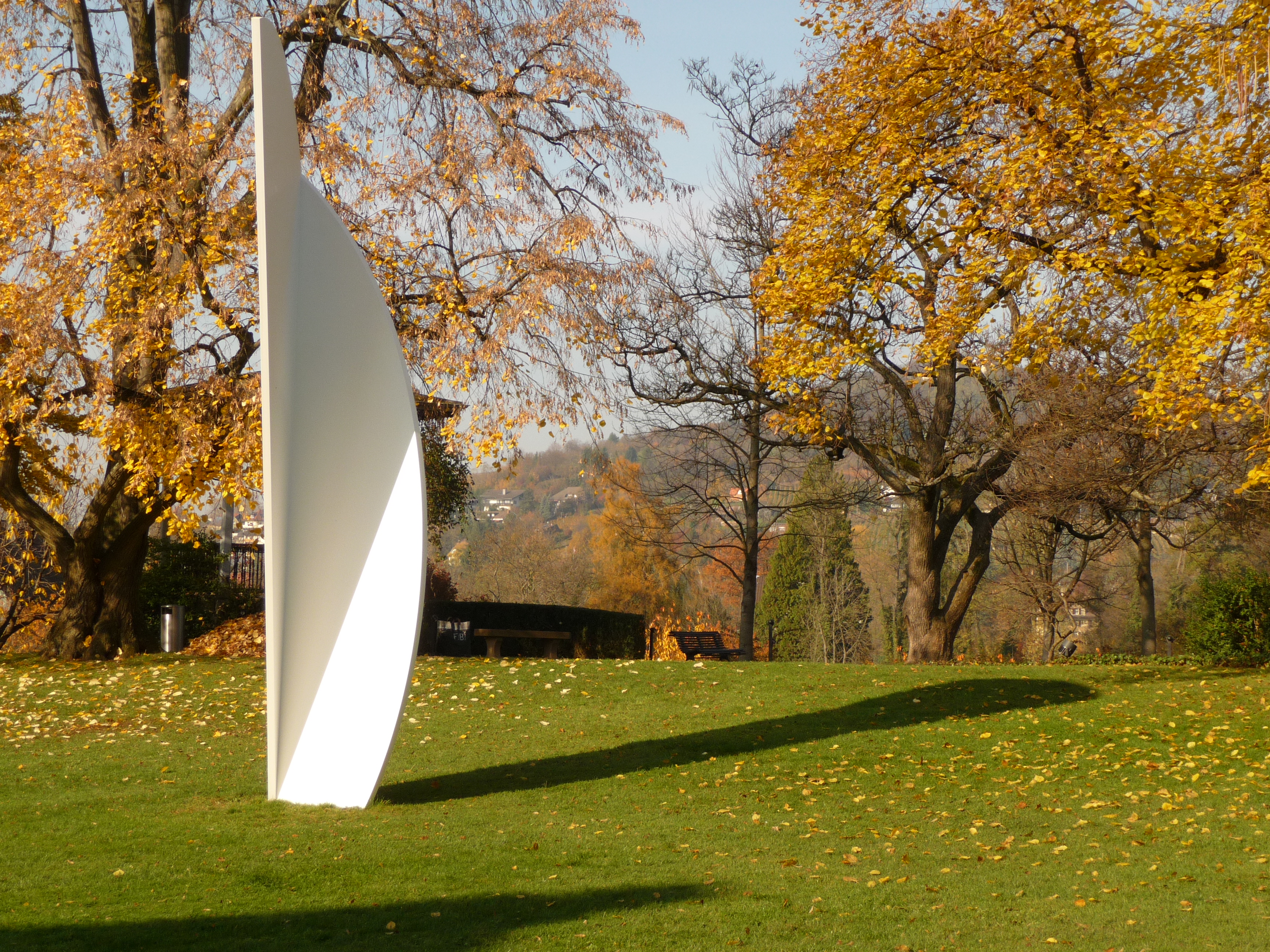
White Curves (2002), made of white aluminium, in the garden of the Fondation Beyeler in Riehen, Switzerland

Although Kelly may be better known for his paintings, he also worked at sculpture throughout his career. In 1958, Kelly conceived one of his first wood sculptures, Concorde Relief I (1958), a modestly scaled wall relief in elm, which explores the visual play and balance between two rectangular forms layered on top of each other, the uppermost with its top-right and lower-left corners removed. He made 30 sculptures in wood throughout his career. From 1959 onwards, he created freestanding folded sculptures. The Rocker series began in 1959 after Kelly's casual conversation with Agnes Martin, who lived below him on Coenties Slip in Lower Manhattan. Playing with the paper top from a take-out coffee cup, Kelly cut and folded a section of the round object, which he then put on the table and rocked back and forth. Soon after, he constructed his first sculpture-in-the-round, Pony. The title refers to a child's hobby horse with curving rocker supports.

In 1973 Kelly began regularly making large-scale outdoor sculpture. Kelly gave up painted surfaces, instead choosing unvarnished steel, aluminum or bronze, often in totem-like configurations such as Curve XXIII (1981). While the totemic forms of his freestanding sculptures can measure up to 15 feet tall, his wall reliefs can span more than 14 feet wide. Kelly's sculpture "is founded on its adherence to absolute simplicity and clarity of form." For his 1980s sculptures, during this period of his time in Spencertown, the artist devoted for the first time as much energy to his sculptures as to his painting, and in the process producing over sixty percent of his total 140 sculptures. Kelly created his pieces using a succession of ideas on various forms. He might have begun with a drawing, enhanced the drawing to create a print, taken the print and created a freestanding piece, which was then made into a sculpture. His sculptures are meant to be entirely simple and can be viewed quickly, often only in one glance. The viewer observes smooth, flat surfaces that are secluded from the space that surrounds them. This sense of flatness and minimalism makes it hard to tell the difference between the foreground and background. Kelly's Blue Disc was included in the seminal 1966 exhibit at the Jewish Museum in New York entitled, Primary Structures, alongside many much younger artists just beginning to work with minimal forms.

=== Style ===
William Rubin noted that "Kelly's development had been resolutely inner-directed: neither a reaction to Abstract Expressionism nor the outcome of a dialogue with his contemporaries." Many of his paintings consist of a single (usually bright) color, with some canvases being of irregular shape, sometimes called "shaped canvases." The quality of line seen in his paintings and in the form of his shaped canvases is very subtle, and implies perfection. This is demonstrated in his piece Block Island Study (1959).

=== Influences ===
Kelly's background in the military has been suggested as a source of the seriousness of his works. While serving time in the army, Kelly was exposed to and influenced by the camouflage with which his specific battalion worked. This taught him about the use of form and shadow, as well as the construction and deconstruction of the visible. It was fundamental to his early education as an artist. Ralph Coburn, a friend of Kelly's from Boston, introduced him to the technique of automatic drawing while visiting in Paris. Kelly embraced this technique of making an image without looking at the sheet of paper. These techniques helped Kelly in loosening his drawing style and broadened his acceptance of what he believed to be art. During his last year in Paris, Kelly was ill and also suffered depression; Sims thought that influenced his predominant use of black and white during that period.

Kelly's admiration for Henri Matisse and Pablo Picasso are apparent in his work. He trained himself to view things in various ways and work in different mediums because of their inspiration. Piet Mondrian influenced the nonobjective forms he used in both his paintings and sculptures. Kelly was first influenced by the art and architecture of the Romanesque and Byzantine eras while he was studying in Paris. His introduction to Surrealism and Neo-Plasticism influenced his work and caused him to test the abstraction of geometric forms.

=== Curating ===
In 2014 Kelly organized a show of Matisse drawings at the Mount Holyoke College Art Museum in South Hadley, Massachusetts. In 2015, he curated "Monet/Kelly" at the Clark Art Institute.

In 1990 Kelly curated the exhibition, "Artist's Choice: Ellsworth Kelly Fragmentation and the Single Form," at the Museum of Modern Art.

== Personal life ==
In 1956, he met Robert Indiana who moved in the same building and they became partners. Kelly became his mentor. They broke up around 1964. One of the reasons was Indiana's use of words in his paintings and Kelly considered such technique not worthy of high art.

From 1984 until his death, Kelly lived with his husband, photographer Jack Shear, who serves as the director of the Ellsworth Kelly Foundation.

== Artworks (selection) ==
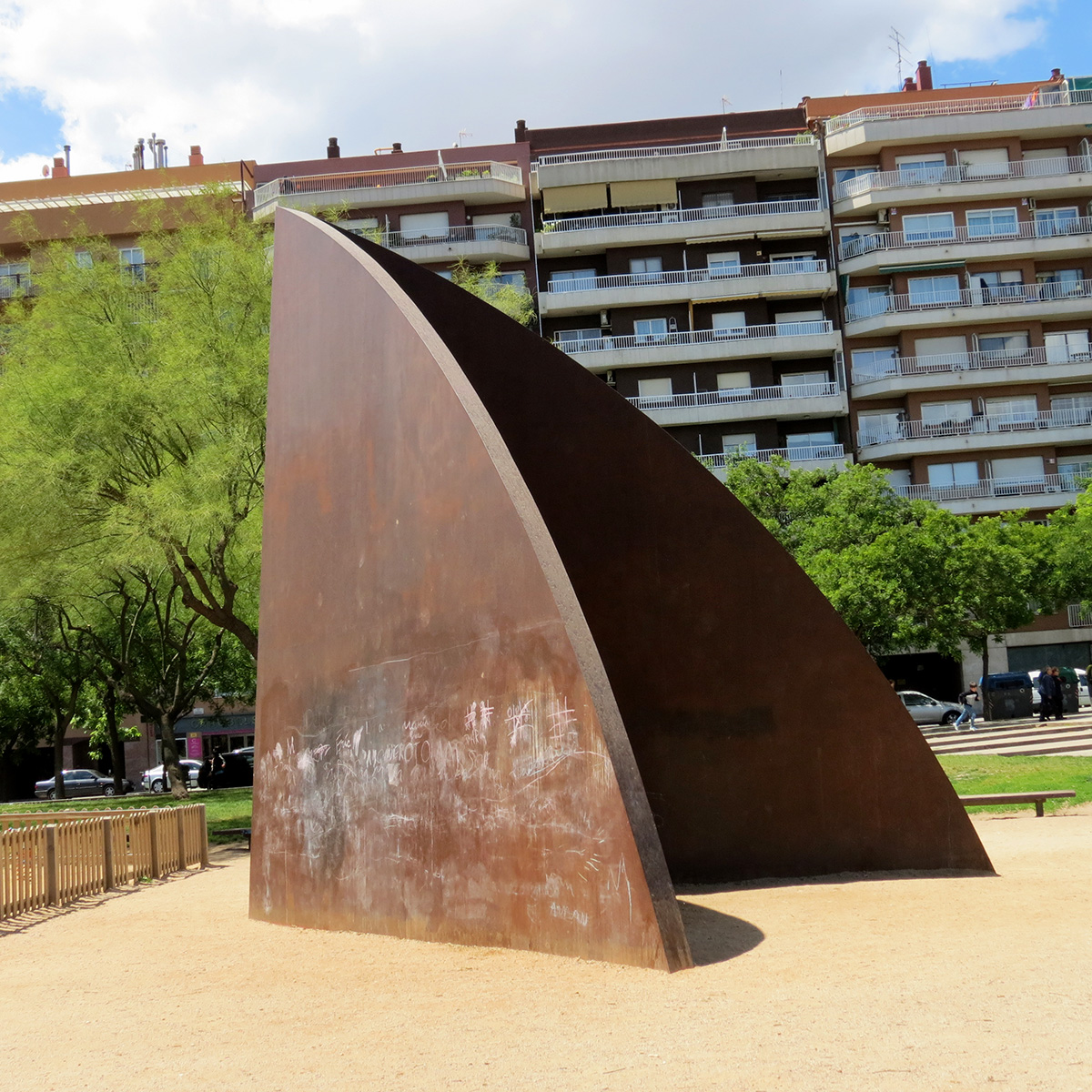
Dihedrally shaped sculpture, Barcelona

- Red Yellow Blue White and Black, Red Yellow Blue White and Black II 1953, oil on canvas, Art Institute of Chicago, Chicago
- White Disk, White Disk III 1961, oil paint on wood, Art Institute of Chicago, Chicago
- Window, Museum of Modern Art, Paris, 1949, oil and wood on canvas, Private Collection
- Spectrum of Colors Arranged by Chance, 1951–53, oil on wood, San Francisco Museum of Modern Art
- Black Ripe, 1955, oil on canvas, Collection of Harry W. and Mary Margaret Anderson
- Sculpture for a Large Wall, 1956–57, anodized aluminum, Museum of Modern Art, New York
- Red Orange (Maya), 1959, oil on canvas, Wadsworth Atheneum, Hartford
- Red Blue Green, 1963, oil on canvas, Museum of Contemporary Art, San Diego
- Curve IX, 1974, polished aluminum, Private Collection
- Houston Triptych, 1986, bronze, Museum of Fine Arts, Houston
- Three Panels: Orange, Dark Gray, Green, 1986, oil on canvas, Museum of Modern Art, New York
- Red Curves, 1996, oil on canvas, Private Collection
- High Yellow, 1960, oil on canvas, Blanton Museum of Art in Austin, TX
- Nine Squares 1976–77, oil on canvas, Collection of Tate
- "Spectrum VIII" (2014), acrylic on canvas, 12 joined panels, Fondation Louis Vuitton, Paris
- Austin, 2015, structure, Blanton Museum of Art in Austin, TX
- Barcelona houses sculptures of Ellsworth Kelly (1987). A piece of his "Totem" series stands at the entrance of the Parc de la Creueta del Coll. The Plaça del General Moragues, a small square near Bac de Roda Bridge, is graced with two pieces: Another totem and a dihedrally shaped sculpture.

== Exhibitions ==
Kelly's first solo exhibition was held at the Galerie Arnaud, Paris, in 1951. His first solo show in New York was held at the Betty Parsons Gallery in 1956. In 1957, he showed works in a group exhibition at the Ferus Gallery, Los Angeles. In 1959 he was included in the Museum of Modern Art's ground-breaking exhibition, Sixteen Americans. Kelly was invited to show at the São Paulo Biennial in 1961. His work was later included in the documenta in 1964, 1968, 1977, 1992. A room of his paintings was included in the 2007 Venice Biennale.

Kelly's first retrospective was held at the Museum of Modern Art in 1973. His work has since been recognized in numerous retrospective exhibitions, including a sculpture exhibition at the Whitney Museum of American Art, New York, in 1982; an exhibition of works on paper and a show of his print works that traveled extensively in the United States and Canada from 1987 to 1988; and a career retrospective in 1996 organized by the Solomon R. Guggenheim Museum, which traveled to the Museum of Contemporary Art in Los Angeles, the Tate Gallery in London, and the Haus der Kunst in Munich. Since then, solo exhibitions of Kelly's work have been mounted at the Metropolitan Museum of Art in New York (1998), Fogg Art Museum in Cambridge (1999), San Francisco Museum of Modern Art (1988/2002), Philadelphia Museum of Art (2007), and Museum of Modern Art in New York (2007).

In 1993 the Galerie nationale du Jeu de Paume in Paris mounted the exhibition "Ellsworth Kelly: The French Years, 1948–54," based on the artist's relationship with the city, which travelled to the National Gallery of Art, Washington D.C.; in 2008, the Musée d'Orsay honored Kelly with the exhibition "Correspondences: Paul Cézanne Ellsworth Kelly". Haus der Kunst exhibited the first comprehensive retrospective of Kelly's black and white works in 2012.

On the occasion of the artist's 90th birthday in 2013, the National Gallery of Art in Washington mounted an exhibition of his prints Ellsworth Kelly: Colored Paper Images; the Barnes Foundation in Philadelphia put together five sculptures in a show; the Phillips Collection in Washington exhibited his panel paintings; and the Museum of Modern Art opened a show of the "Chatham Series".

Kelly's work was acquired by the Pérez Art Museum Miami, Florida, through a large donation from the Holding Capital Group, and exhibited as part of Beyond the Limited Life of Painting: Prints and Multiples from the Holding Capital Group Collection, in 2014 and 2015. In 2024, PAMM is again including Kelly's work in Every Sound Is a Shape of Time: Selections from PAMM's Collection.

A retrospective entitled "Ellsworth Kelly at 100" was organized in 2023 by the Glenstone Museum in Potomac, Maryland, and was scheduled to travel to Paris and Doha.

=== Selected solo exhibitions ===
- 1951 Kelly Peintures et reliefs, Galerie Arnaud, Paris
- 1956 Betty Parsons Gallery, New York
- 1957 Betty Parsons Gallery, New York
- 1957 Young America 1957, Whitney Museum of American Art, New York
- 1973 Ellsworth Kelly, Museum of Modern Art, New York
- 1977 Ellsworth Kelly: Paintings, Leo Castelli Gallery, New York
- 1982 Ellsworth Kelly: Sculpture, Whitney Museum of American Art, New York
- 1985 Ellsworth Kelly: White Panel II, High Museum of Art, Atlanta
- 1987 Ellsworth Kelly: Works on Paper, Fort Worth Art Museum, Fort Worth
- 1994 Ellsworth Kelly: Recent Paintings, Matthew Marks Gallery, New York
- 1996 Ellsworth Kelly: A Retrospective, Guggenheim Museum, New York
- 2002 Ellsworth Kelly in San Francisco, San Francisco Museum of Modern Art, San Francisco
- 2003 Ellsworth Kelly: The Self-Portrait Drawings, 1944–1992, Matthew Marks Gallery, New York
- 2006 Ellsworth Kelly: New Paintings, Matthew Marks Gallery, New York
- 2010 Ellsworth Kelly: Drawings 1954–1962, Middlesbrough Institute of Modern Art, Middlesbrough, United Kingdom
- 2012 Ellsworth Kelly: Schwarz und Weiss, Museum Wiesbaden, Wiesbaden
- 2012 Ellsworth Kelly Plant Drawings, Metropolitan Museum of Art, New York
- 2012-13 Ellsworth Kelly: Colored Paper Images, National Gallery of Art, Washington, D.C.
- 2012 Ellsworth Kelly: Sculpture, Morgan Library & Museum, New York
- 2014 Monet | Kelly, Clark Art Institute, Williamstown, Massachusetts
- 2023-24 Ellsworth Kelly, Saint Louis Art Museum, Saint Louis, Missouri

== Public commissions ==
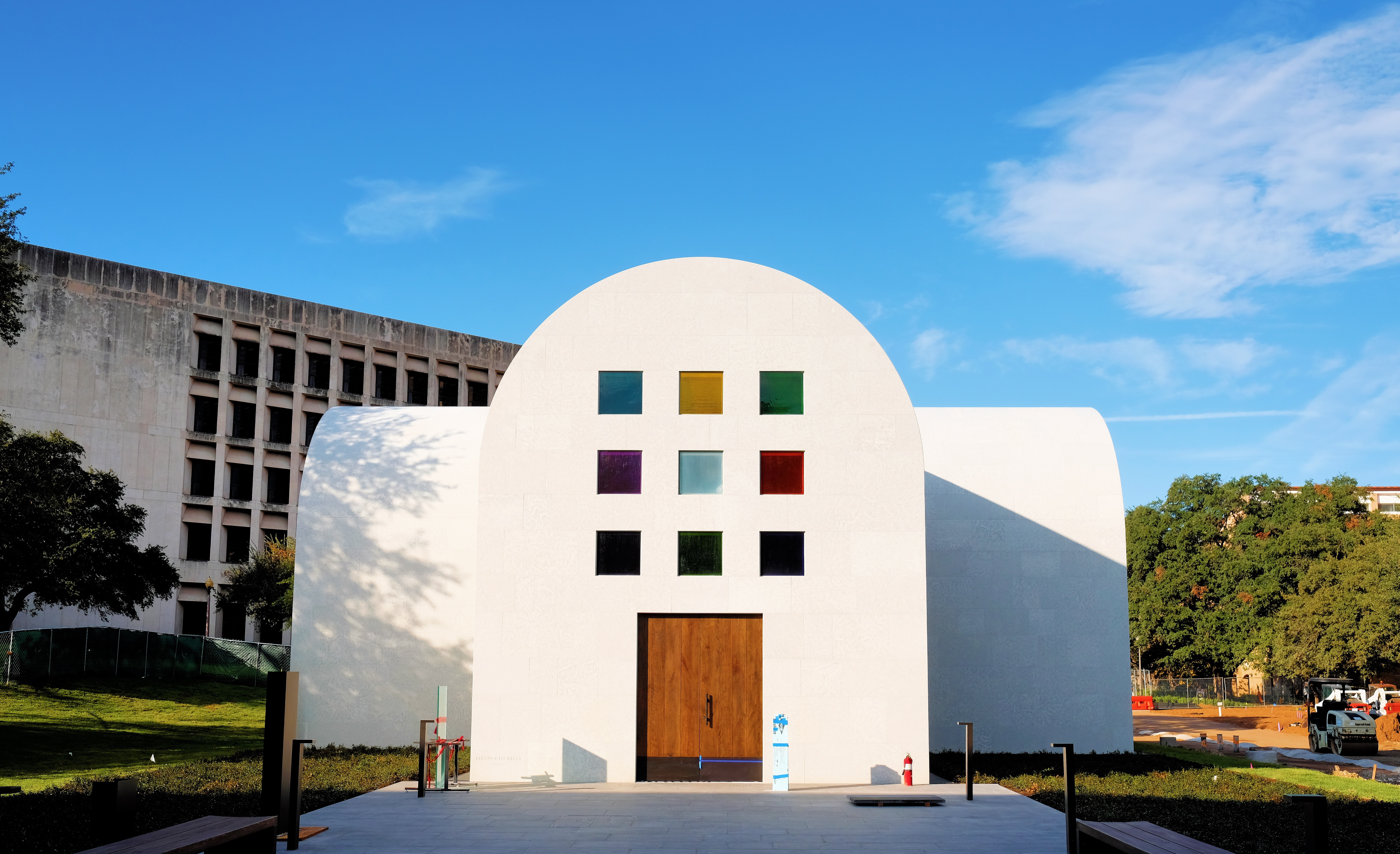
Kelly's Austin on the grounds of the Blanton Museum of Art in Austin, Texas.

In 1957 Kelly was commissioned to produce a 65-foot-long wall sculpture for the Transportation Building at Penn Center in Philadelphia, his largest work to that date. Largely forgotten, the sculpture entitled Sculpture for a Large Wall (1957) was eventually dismantled. Kelly has since executed many public commissions, including Wright Curve (1966), a steel sculpture designed for permanent installation in the Guggenheim's Peter B. Lewis Theater; a mural for the UNESCO headquarters in Paris in 1969; Curve XXII (I Will) at Lincoln Park in Chicago in 1981; a 1985 commission by I. M. Pei for the Raffles City building in Singapore; the Houston Triptych, vertical bronze planes mounted on a tall concrete at the Museum of Fine Arts, Houston, in 1986; Totem (1987), a sculpture for the Parc de la Creueta del Coll, Barcelona; the Dallas Panels (Blue Green Black Red) (1989) for the Morton H. Meyerson Symphony Center, Dallas; a 1989 sculpture for the headquarters of Nestlé in Vevey, Switzerland; Gaul (1993), a monumental sculpture commissioned by the Institute d'Art Contemporain, Nîmes, France; a two-part memorial for the United States Holocaust Memorial Museum, Washington, D.C., in 1993; and large-scale Berlin panels for the Deutscher Bundestag, Berlin, in 1998. For the John Joseph Moakley United States Courthouse (designed by Henry N. Cobb) in Boston he designed The Boston Panels, 21 brilliantly colored aluminum panels installed in the central rotunda as a single work throughout the building.

In 2013 Ellsworth Kelly was commissioned the work "Spectrum VIII" (completed in 2014) a large-scale multi-panel painting serving as curtain for the Auditorium designed by Frank Gehry at the Louis Vuitton Foundation, Paris.

Kelly's two-paneled Blue Black (2001), 28 feet tall and made of painted honeycomb aluminum, was commissioned for the Pulitzer Arts Foundation, St. Louis, and the large-scale bronze Untitled (2005) was commissioned specifically for the courtyard of the Phillips Collection. In 2005, Kelly was commissioned with the only site-specific work for the Modern wing of the Art Institute of Chicago by Renzo Piano. He created White Curve, the largest wall sculpture he has ever made, which is on display since 2009. Kelly installed Berlin Totem, a 40 feet stainless-steel sculpture, in the courtyard of the Embassy of the United States, Berlin, in 2008.

In 1986 Kelly conceived his first free-standing building for a private collector, but it was never realized. Only in 2015, the Blanton Museum of Art acquired his design for a 2,715-square-foot stone building, including 14 black-and-white marble panels and colored glass windows, planning to build it on the museum's grounds at the University of Texas, Austin. The building was opened to the public February 18, 2018. A work of art and architecture, Austin, is deemed the culmination of Kelly's career.

Kelly was commissioned to create a large outdoor sculpture in 1968 for the Nelson A. Rockefeller Empire State Plaza Art Collection in Albany, NY. The sculpture titled Yellow Blue was inspired by the Empire State Plaza setting, and is Kelly's largest standing sculpture at nine feet high and nearly sixteen feet across. Yellow Blue was his first steel sculpture and remains the only one to date in painted steel.

== Collections ==
In 1957 the Whitney Museum of American Art bought a painting, Atlantic, which depicted two white wave-like arcs against solid black; it was Kelly's first museum purchase. Today, his work is in many public collections, including those of the Centre Pompidou, Paris, the Museo Nacional Centro de Arte Reina Sofía, Madrid, the Governor Nelson A. Rockefeller Empire State Plaza Art Collection, Albany, NY, The Hyde Collection, Glens Falls, NY, and Tate Modern, London. In 1999, the San Francisco Museum of Modern Art announced that it had bought 22 works, paintings, wall reliefs and sculptures, by Ellsworth Kelly. They have been valued at more than $20 million. In 2003, the Menil Collection received Kelly's Tablet, 188 framed works on paper, including sketches, working drawings and collages. Notable private collectors include, among others, Eli Broad and Gwyneth Paltrow.

== Recognition ==
- 1963: Brandeis Creative Arts Award, Brandeis University, Waltham, Massachusetts
- 1964: Carnegie International
- 1974: Member of the National Institute of Arts and Letters
- 1987: Chevalier de l’Ordre des Arts et des Lettres
- 1999: Edward MacDowell Medal
- 2000: Praemium Imperiale
- 2013: Brandeis University honorary doctorate of Humane Letters, Brandeis University, Waltham, Massachusetts
- 2013: National Medal of Arts, presented by the President of the United States

Kelly has also received numerous honorary degrees, among others from Bard College (1996), Annandale-on-Hudson, New York; Royal College of Art, London (1997); Harvard University, Cambridge (2003); and Williams College (2005).

=== Kelly postage stamps ===
The United States Postal Service announced in January, 2019, that a set of stamps honoring Kelly's artwork would be issued in 2019. The USPS press release acknowledges Kelly's pioneering of a "distinctive style of abstraction based on real elements reduced to their essential forms." Ten works are represented, including Yellow White, Colors for a Large Wall, Blue Red Rocker, Spectrum I, South Ferry, Blue Green, Orange Red Relief (for Delphine Seyrig), Meschers, Red Blue and Gaza. The set of stamps was issued on May 31, 2019.

== Art market ==
The dealer Betty Parsons first offered him a solo exhibition in 1956. In 1965, after nearly a decade with Parsons, he began to show with the Sidney Janis Gallery. In the 1970s and 1980s, his work was handled jointly by Leo Castelli and Blum Helman in New York. In 1992, he joined the Matthew Marks Gallery, New York and Los Angeles, and the Anthony d’Offay Gallery in London. The facade of Marks's Los Angeles gallery was inspired by Study for Black and White Panels, a collage he made while living in Paris in 1954, and a painting, Black Over White. From 1964 he produced prints and editioned sculptures at Gemini G.E.L. in Los Angeles and Tyler Graphics Ltd near New York City.

In 2014 Kelly's painting Red Curve (1982) sold at auction for $4.5 million at Christie's New York. That auction record for a work by Ellsworth Kelly was set by the 13-part painting Spectrum VI (1969), which sold for $5.2 million at Sotheby's New York, Contemporary Art Evening sale, November 14, 2007.

In Nov 2019, Christie's set an auction record for the artist with the work Red Curve VII, sold for a $9.8 million.
