= Famous for being famous =

Pejorative term for someone who is famous for no particular reason

Famous for being famous is a circular term, often used pejoratively, for someone who attains celebrity status for no clearly identifiable reason—as opposed to fame based on achievement, skill, or talent.

== History ==
The term originates from an analysis of the media-dominated world called The Image: A Guide to Pseudo-events in America (1962), by historian and social theorist Daniel J. Boorstin. In it, he defined the celebrity as "a person who is known for his well-knownness". He further argued that the graphic revolution in journalism and other forms of communication had severed fame from greatness, and that this severance hastened the decay of fame into mere notoriety. Over the years, the phrase has been glossed as "a celebrity is someone who is famous for being famous".

In 1966, the Pocono Record columnist Jef Cox cited socialite Jane "Baby Jane" Holzer—best known for being a Warhol superstar—as an example of celebrity sustained primarily by media attention and social prominence, arguing that her rise demonstrated how "fame begets fame." His commentary anticipated the concept of being "famous for being famous."

The British journalist Malcolm Muggeridge may have been the first to use the actual phrase in the introduction to his book Muggeridge Through The Microphone (1967) in which he wrote:

In the past if someone was famous or notorious, it was for something—as a writer or an actor or a criminal; for some talent or distinction or abomination. Today one is famous for being famous. People who come up to one in the street or in public places to claim recognition nearly always say: "I've seen you on the telly!"

Neal Gabler more recently refined the definition of celebrity to distinguish those who have gained recognition for having done virtually nothing of significance—a phenomenon he dubbed the "Zsa Zsa Factor" in honor of Zsa Zsa Gabor, who parlayed her marriage to actor George Sanders into a brief movie career and the movie career into a much more enduring celebrity. He goes on to define the celebrity as "human entertainment", by which he means a person who provides entertainment by the very process of living.

This topic is also known in German-speaking countries. Terms like "Schickeria" or "Adabei" characterize the media, which on the one hand are also understood critically but on the other hand are an important editorial topic that electronic quality media do not want to do without today for commercial reasons. Reporting on people is fundamentally an important area of journalism that functions according to its own rules, especially in the print medium, and according to journalist Norman Schenz is characterized as "We no longer just write about an event, we tell stories".

== Similar terms ==
=== Famesque ===
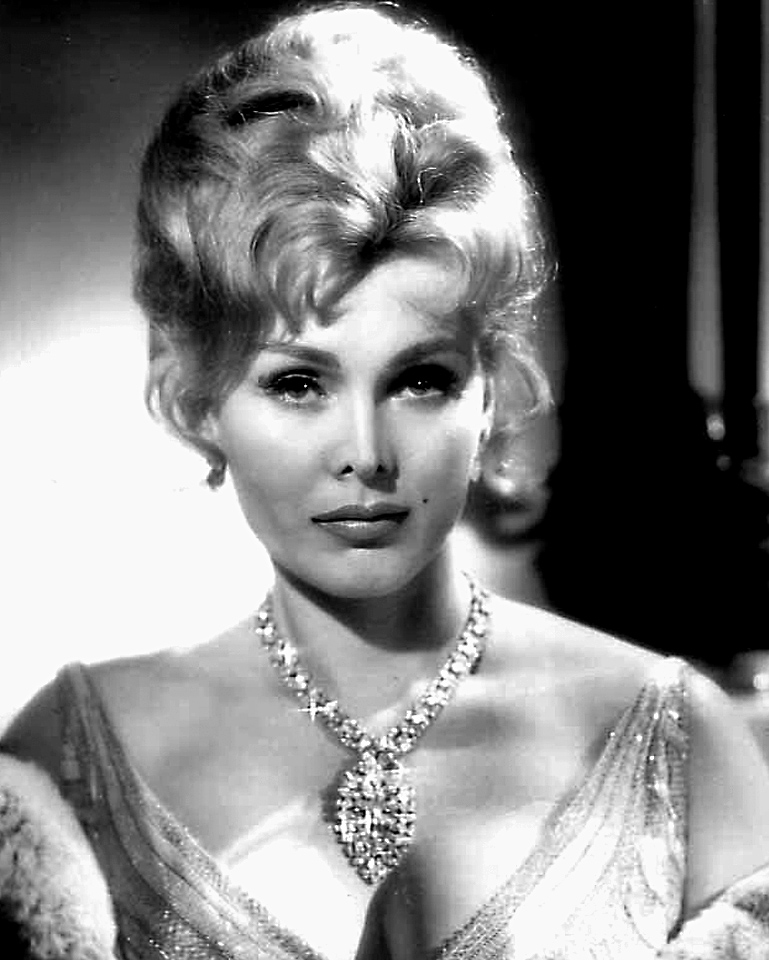
Zsa Zsa Gabor

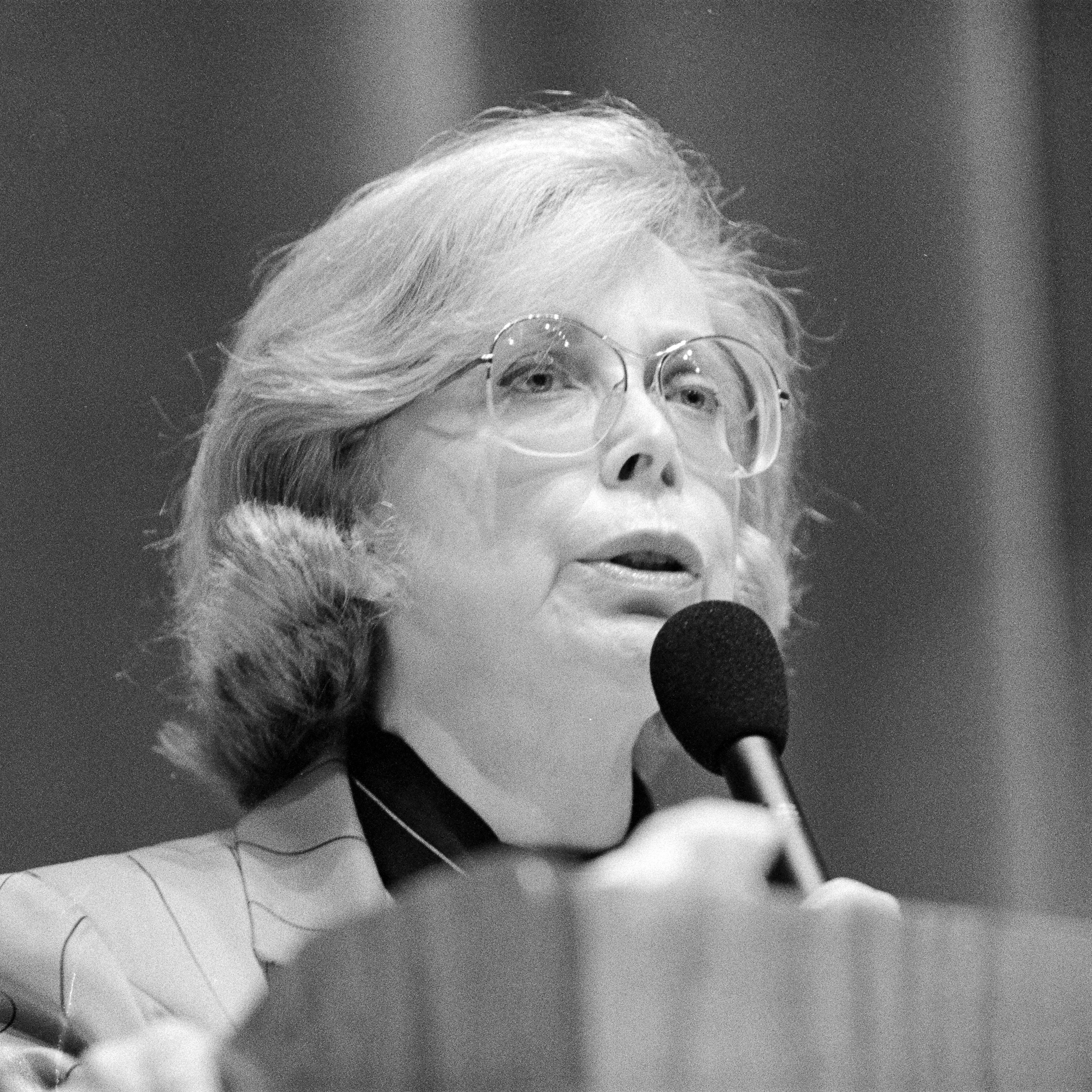
Joyce Brothers

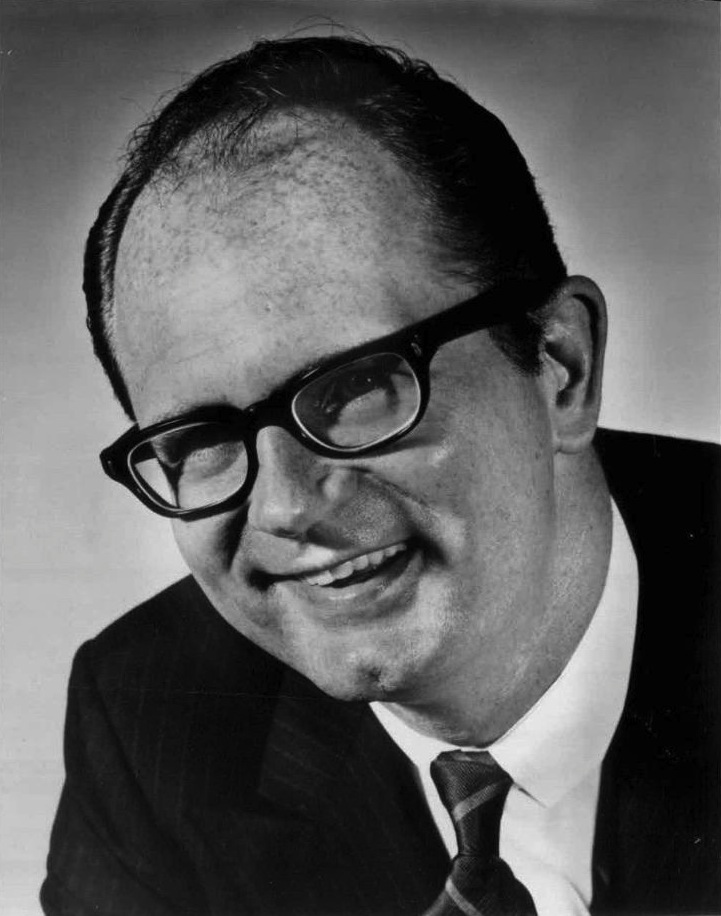
Charles Nelson Reilly

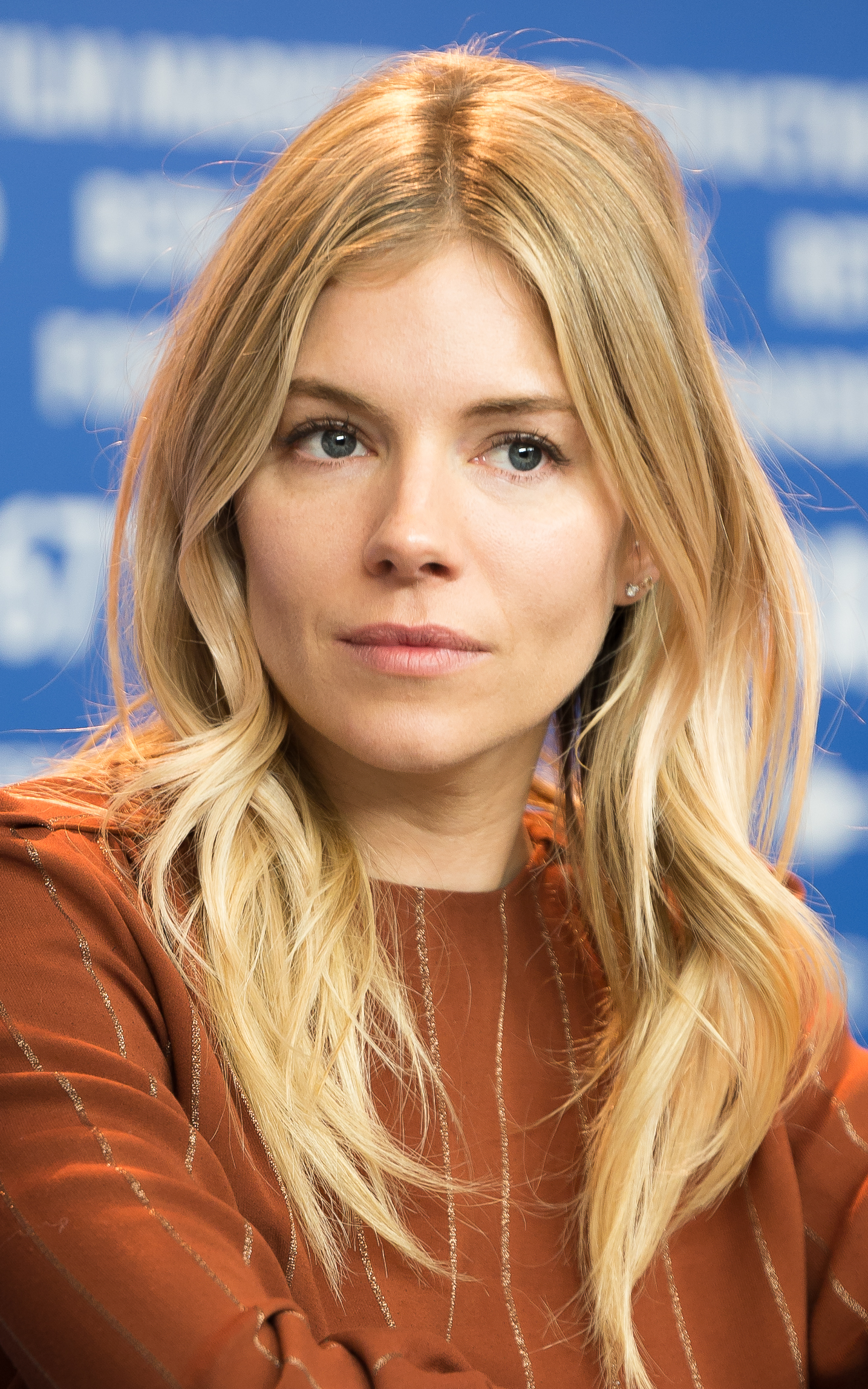
Sienna Miller

Individuals cited as "famesque" by Amy Argetsinger

The Washington Post writer Amy Argetsinger coined the term famesque to define actors, singers, or athletes whose fame is mostly (if not entirely) due to one's physical attractiveness and/or personal life, rather than actual talent and (if any) successful career accomplishments. Argetsinger argued, "The famesque of 2009 are descended from that dawn-of-TV creation, the Famous for Being Famous. Turn on a talk show or Hollywood Squares and there'd be Zsa Zsa Gabor, Joyce Brothers, Charles Nelson Reilly, so friendly and familiar and—what was it they did again?" (Reilly and Brothers were poor examples in that both had identifiable pathways to their stardom related to their talents; Reilly found fame as a Broadway character actor before reaching television, while Brothers' fame came from her overcoming apparent rigging against her to win the game show The $64,000 Question). She also used actress Sienna Miller as a modern-day example; "Miller became famesque by dating Jude Law . . . and then really famesque when he cheated on her with the nanny—to the point that she was the one who made Balthazar Getty famesque (even though he's the one with the hit TV series, Brothers & Sisters) when he reportedly ran off from his wife with her for a while."

=== Celebutante ===
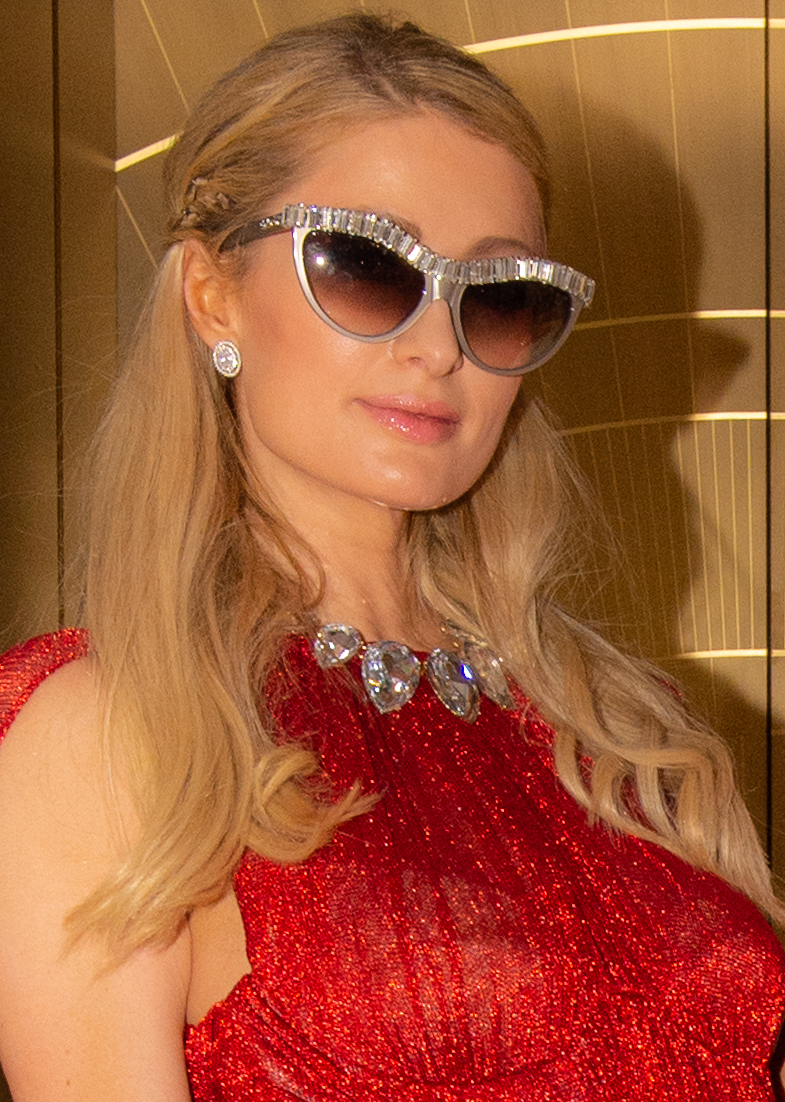
Paris Hilton

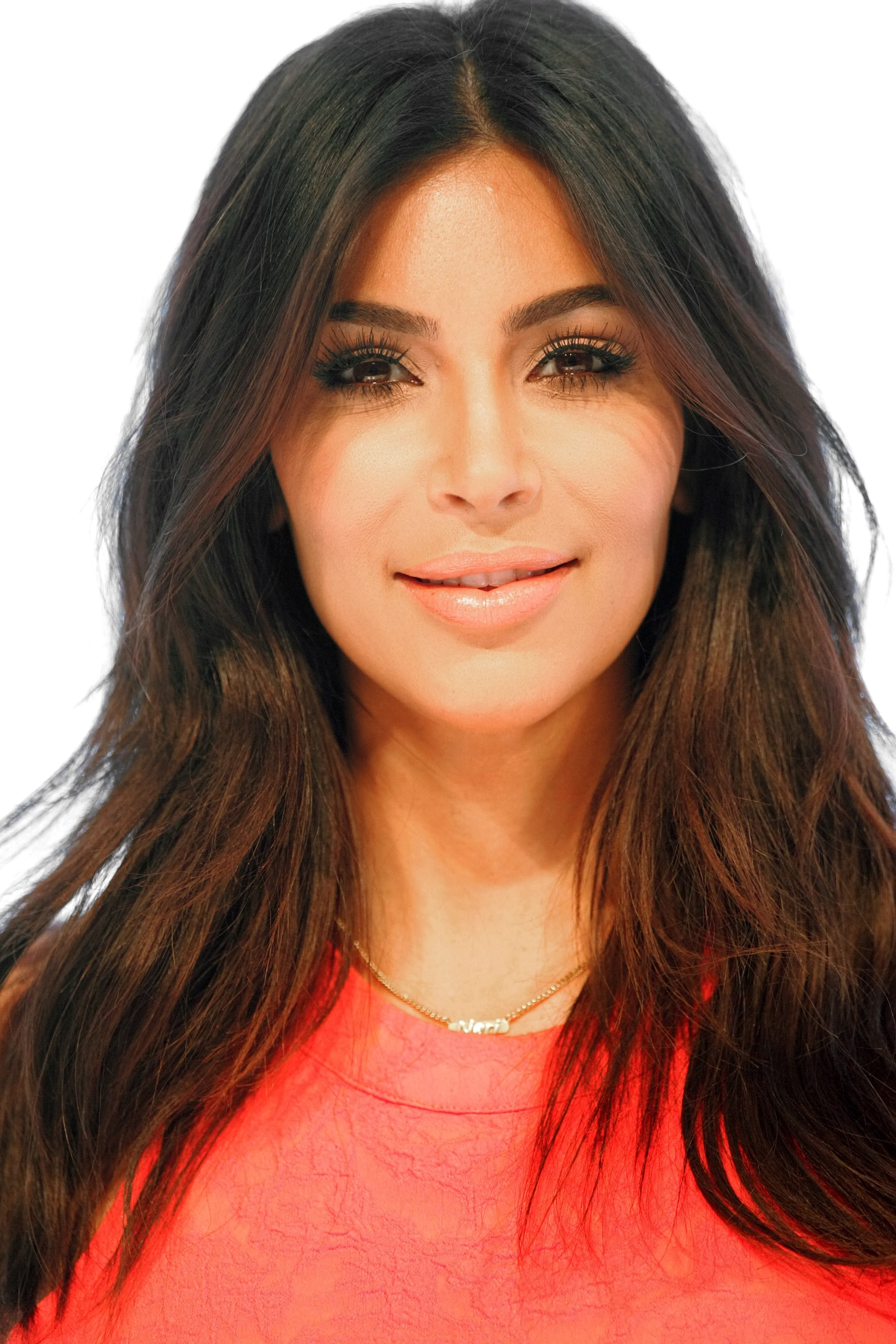
Kim Kardashian

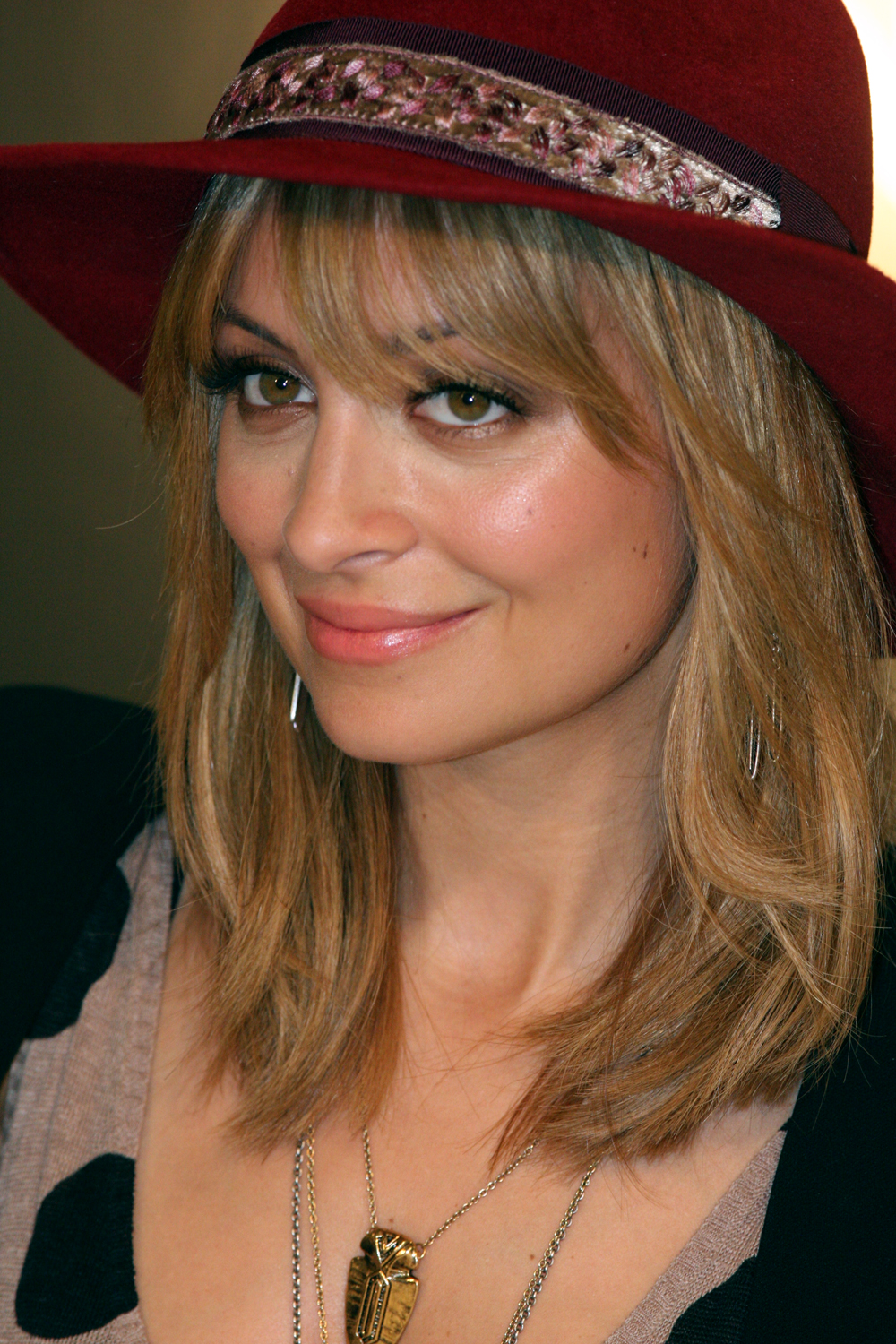
Nicole Richie

Individuals described as celebutantes

Celebutante is a portmanteau of the words "celebrity" and "debutante". The male equivalent is sometimes spelled celebutant. The term has been used to describe heiresses like Paris Hilton and Nicole Richie in entertainment journalism. More recently, the term and descriptions similar to the term have been applied to the Kardashian–Jenner family. During an interview in 2011 with some of the Kardashians, interviewer Barbara Walters said, "You are all often described as 'famous for being famous'. You don't really act, you don't sing, you don't dance. You don't have any – forgive me – any talent." Later, in 2016, Time described the Kardashian-Jenner family as ubiquitous celebutantes for being the highest earning reality stars.

The term has been traced back to a 1939 Walter Winchell society column in which he used the word to describe prominent society debutante Brenda Frazier, who was a traditional "high-society" debutante from a noted family, but whose debut attracted an unprecedented wave of media attention. The word appeared again in a 1985 Newsweek article about New York City's clubland celebrities, focusing on the lifestyles of writer James St. James, Lisa Edelstein and Dianne Brill, who was crowned "Queen of the Night" by Andy Warhol.

A variant of the phenomenon is the case of the English actress Rula Lenska who became famous by being presented in a series of TV commercials as if she were already famous. More recently, Indian television personality Urfi Javed has become emblematic of being "famous for being famous", noted in the media for her bold fashion choices, viral social media presence, and being frequently in the public eye with little traditional acting portfolio.

== See also ==
- 15 minutes of fame
- Attention inequality
- It girl
- Keeping Up with the Kardashians
- The Kardashians
- The Simple Life
- Reality television
- Socialite
- Tarento
- Tautology (language)
