= Audrey Beck =

Audrey Beck may refer to:

- Audrey Jones Beck (1924–2003), philanthropist in Houston
- Audrey P. Beck (1931–1983), American politician and educator
