= Leonardo Polo =

Spanish philosopher (1926–2013)

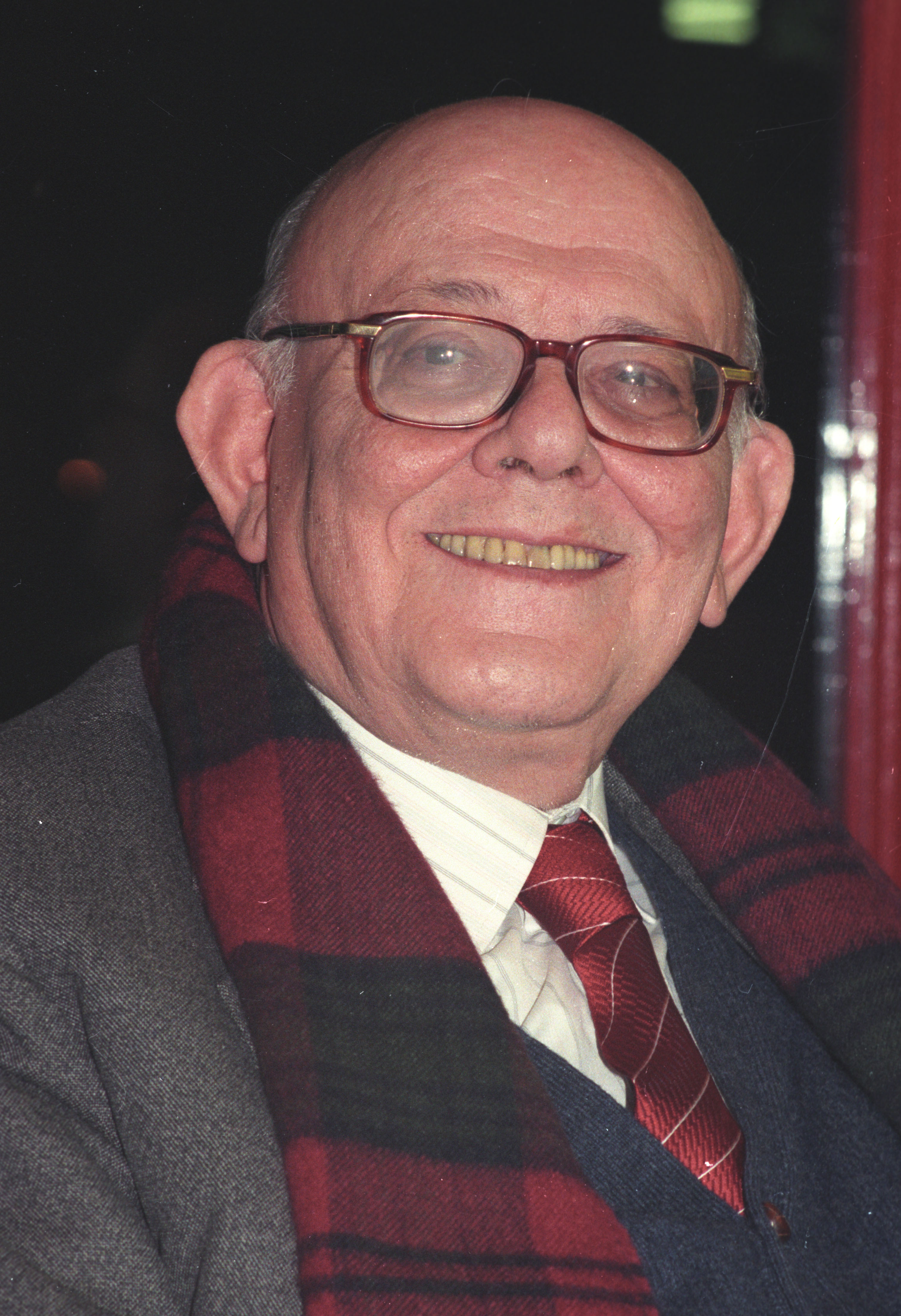
- Born: 1 February 1926; Madrid, Spain
- Died: 9 February 2013 (aged 87); Pamplona, Spain

Philosophical work
- Era: 20th-century philosophy
- Region: Western philosopher
- School: Continental philosophy
- Main interests: Metaphysics, epistemology, philosophical anthropology
- Notable ideas: The abandonment of the mental limit, The expansion of the real distinction between 'essence' and 'act of being' to philosophical anthropology, Transcendental anthropology

Leonardo Polo (February 1, 1926 – February 9, 2013) was a Spanish philosopher best known for his philosophical method called abandonment of the mental limit and for the philosophical implications of the application of this method.

This method of detecting the mental limit in conditions such that it can be abandoned, results in a rethinking of classical and modern themes that opens up a wide range of philosophical fields. Principal among these are: (1) the act of being of the physical universe (metaphysics); (2) the quadruple con-causality (or essence) of the physical universe (philosophy of nature); (3) the act of being of the human person (transcendental anthropology); (4) the manifestation of the human person through its essence (anthropology of the human essence).

In addition to this, his works cover a wide range of fields including psychology, neuroscience, philosophy of science, philosophy of language, social ethics, political economy and business theory.

Throughout his more than forty books, Polo engaged with both Classical and Medieval thinkers such as Aristotle, Thomas Aquinas, and William of Ockham, as well as Modern and Contemporary philosophers such as Descartes, Kant, Hegel, Husserl, Heidegger, and Nietzsche.

In dialogue with the great thinkers of the history of philosophy, Polo sought to further the achievements of traditional philosophy as well as rectify and correct the project of Modern philosophy.

== Life ==
=== Early life (1926–1949) ===
Leonardo Polo was born in Madrid, February 1, 1926. He attended elementary school at the French High School (Liceo francés) of Madrid, and started his secondary education in Madrid, just as the Spanish Civil War was beginning in 1936. At this time, during the Spanish Civil War, his father held the position of Vice-mayor of the city. When the Republican government urged civilian to leave the capital city of Spain, Polo's family moved to Albacete, where he spent his first two years of secondary education. His father, a lawyer by profession, held the position of Chief Prosecutor for the city of Albacete from 1936 to 1937. At the end of the Spanish Civil War, the family returned to Madrid, except for his father, who was forced into exile, first to Nicaragua and then to Chile, where he died in 1946.

Upon the return of his family to Madrid, Leonardo Polo continued his secondary education at the Cardinal Cisneros Institute. However, the change of the 1934 plan of studies for that of 1938 forced him to repeat the second year of studies that he had already done in Albacete. During this period, he read the book Fundamental Philosophy by the Spanish philosopher Jaime Balmes. He was fifteen years old at the time. The basic idea that he drew from this work was of the importance of the first principles, that these could not just be one, and that philosophy must be understood from the point of view of these first principles (in a doctoral course about the Logos in 1995, he would say, "philosophy is the knowledge of principles by principles"). The importance given to the first principles then led him to the Summa Theologiae of Thomas Aquinas, and more specifically Question 45, which presents creation as an accidental relation. This led Polo think that Thomas Aquinas could be corrected and expanded on this point, since if creation has to do with what is first, if it is extra nihilum, if created act of being is being insofar as being, then the relation with the Creator cannot be an accident, but rather a relation of principles. Polo would later make numerous references to Aquinas in his works, especially with regard to the real distinction between essence and act of being and the need to expand this distinction and apply it to the study of the human person in what Polo would eventually call a transcendental anthropology.

At school he also read Ortega y Gasset, Aquinas, and Xavier Zubiri (including the first edition of Naturaleza, Historia y Dios published in 1942). In later years, Polo would also be able to attend lectures by Zubiri on the concept in Madrid and another by Ortega y Gasset on Toynbee.

After secondary school in 1945 and obtaining an extraordinary prize in the State exam, Polo decided to study law. This decision was influenced by family events. At the end of the Spanish Civil War, his uncle, Agustín Barrena, was left in charge of a law firm in which his father and his uncle Luis had once worked. A career in law offered him the opportunity of joining the firm with his uncle and to continue a family tradition, in spite of his own personal inclinations toward more theoretical subjects, and more concretely, toward he study of mathematics. Mathematics did not, however, seem to have much of a future in a country that had just come out of a civil war. For this reason, he studied law for four years.

=== Discovery of the mental limit and early philosophical studies (1952–1966) ===
In 1949, recently graduated, he started practicing law and, as he would later recount, he had to decide between making money by doing law (something which bored him) or to follow his inclinations toward theory and research. To his uncle's great disappointment, he chose the latter, and enrolled in doctoral courses of law. Of these courses, he remembers the one given by García Valdecasas, professor of civil law, with whom he held conversations about Hegel. Upon finishing his doctoral course work, Polo was faced with the choice of doing a doctoral dissertation, but also with the problem of how to make a living during those years dedicated to research. One possibility was to seek a teaching position; and he in fact prepared for a few professorial exams even though in the end he did not pursue them. The topic of research that interested him was the development of an existential interpretation of natural right. During this time his readings centered around Hegel's Philosophy of Right, Heidegger's Being and Time, Kant's Critique of the Practical Reason, Spinoza's Ethics, as well as a number of works by Aristotle and Leibniz. It was at this time that Polo began enrolling in classes of philosophy.

It was spring of 1950 when Polo became aware the existence of what he calls the mental limit. He describes detecting this limit in these terms:

“… it suddenly occurred to me, period. I was thinking about thinking and being, and about what being had to do with thinking; then I realized that we cannot arrive at being if one does not abandon the supposition of the object, because the supposition makes the object limited and a limited knowledge cannot be a knowledge of being if this is taken in the transcendental sense.”

In other words, to become aware of the mental limit of the need to abandon it is to notice that

"one cannot separate, I repeat, being from being, it is not possible to take hold of it objectively because in this way it is "des-realized"; but if being is not real, it is nothing. The intentional consideration of being is a quid pro quo. Being agrees with itself, but, being known intentionaliter is, as the Scholastics would say, an extrinsic denomination. When I know the idea, I do not in any way affect what I know, because the idea of what I know is in my mind as intelligible in act and in reality as intelligible in potency. The real distinction between essence and being makes the question all the more serious, because if being and essence were the same, then knowing something of the essence would be knowing something of being."

Polo describes his discovering in this way: i) "A is A, supposes A", and ii) "Thought being does not think".

According to the first proposition, when we think A objectively (as an object of thought), there is no increase in the reality of A. Also, when we think A, we think A as an object of thought, because what is in the realm of the mind is A as an object. Thus, "A" is already thought, "A" is already given, there is already A. In other words, a mental operation always refers to an object, in which it stops. A consequence of this is that with an intellectual operation, I know A, but if I want to know more about A, I do not know more with the same operation. To know more about A or to know A better, I need a new mental act. I cannot increase the intellection of A with the same act by which I have already thought A. According to this understanding of mental operations, says Polo, the Kantian constructivism of mental objects, and the hegelian dialectic method are misguided attempts at explaining the object of thought.

The second sentence "Thought being does not think" explains a different meaning of the mental limit. While mental activity and objectivity are different, they are inseparable. Without the first one, there is no possibility of the second one: there is no way of finding an idea that could think itself. The intentionality of mental acts always refers to objects where it is impossible to find the known existence. This formulation involves a criticism to the subject-object identity, and a rectification of Heidegger's existentialism.

After two years of basic course work in philosophy, Polo received an opportunity to continue work in his research regarding the existential character of natural right with a research fellowship in Rome that he received from the Higher Council for Scientific Research (headed at that time by Alvaro D'Ors), which had just started a branch in Rome (the Spanish Juridical Institute in Rome). In Rome he had contact with eminent jurists like Del Vecchio and Capograssi. During these years in Rome (from the end of 1952 to September 1954), Leonardo Polo continued to develop the insight that he had received in 1950. A first phase of this involved the topic of his doctoral dissertation, "The Existential Character of Natural Right." However, posing the topic of the existential character of law required resolving a series of more fundamental questions, many of which were related to the intuition of 1950 and which became a long introduction that eventually became a work in itself and which would lead to his research away from the juridical sciences and more toward philosophy.

Polo spent these Roman years reading, thinking intensely, and, above all, writing. German philosophy, Kant and the German Romantics, as well as Hegel and Heidegger, whom he had already known in his younger years, were a major focus of his study during this time. A result of the activity in Rome is a large volume titled The Real Distinction, which he did not publish as such, but would later serve as a staging base for later publications.

The formulations that Leonardo Polo had made with regard to his 1950 intuition became more consistent through the intellectual dialogue with the Idealist philosophers and with Heidegger's existentialism. For example, Polo's reading of Heidegger and of his concern for the "existent", his critic of idealism and his philosophical approach, would lead Polo to his characterization of the human persons as "being additionally" [además]. This being additionally, which according to Polo Heidegger did not see, expresses that the human person is not limited to her thinking, nor even to her acting, but rather is additionally to thinking and action. To be additionally is "to open oneself intimately to be always constantly overflowing" (La libertad, doctoral course, Pamplona, 1990, pro manuscripto).

In 1954, Polo returned from Rome and began working at the recently founded University of Navarre, where he first taught Natural Law and then later (after the beginning of the School of Arts and Letters in 1956) Fundamentals of Philosophy and History of Philosophical Systems. At the same time, he continued his studies of philosophy at the Central University in Madrid as an external student, since his work teaching at Navarre prevented him from attending class. Technical issues forced Polo to transfer his studies to the University of Barcelona. Here he finished a short research work on Karl Marx's anthropology under the direction of Jorge Pérez Ballestar. After receiving his degree from Barcelona in 1959, Polo transferred back to Madrid for the doctoral program and began work on his doctoral dissertation with Antonio Millán-Puelles.

In 1961, Polo obtained a doctoral degree after presenting his dissertation on Descartes. In this work, he presents Descartes as a voluntarist, something uncommon at the time for Spanish academic circles, who considered Descartes more as a rationalist. This dissertation was prepared for publication and appear under the title "Evidencia y realidad en Descartes" (Evidence and Reality in Descartes) in 1963. At this time, as preparation for his application for academic positions at universities, Polo prepared a series of publications base on the thick volume The Real Distinction, which he had written in Rome. Fruit of this work were El accesso al ser (The Access to Being) and El ser I (Being I), published in 1964 and 1966, respectively.

=== Years of silence (1966–1982) ===
Polo's first two books were, unfortunately, widely misunderstood in Spanish intellectual circles. Few were able to understand the complexity of the thematic and methodical dimensions of his proposal and its technical vocabulary. His assertion that freedom is a personal transcendental was also misunderstood. In doing so, some thought that Polo was a thinker on the Hegelian tradition.

Of the four thematic areas which he thought had become available when overcoming our mental limits, Polo only wrote about the first ("Being I: Extramental Existence"). The original plan consisted of four parts: "Being II" would have studied the extramental essence (analysis of the persistence of extramental being in four predicamentales causes); "Being III" would have studied the being of human person, and "Being IV" would have dealt with the essence of man. Nevertheless, he remained silent for fifteen years and did not publish anything aside from a couple of papers. These are years of intense study and exchanges with colleagues.

Polo taught at the University of Granada for two years (1966-1968). After that he moved back to the University of Navarra, where in 1972 he extensively revised Being III and Being IV, writing a new version of his Philosophical Anthropology, which also remained unpublished.

From 1978 he started teaching in universities of South and Central America every year. Polo understood that for those countries education was a means of finding a way out of poverty, mainly because without division of labour, which is central to any modern society, education becomes impossible. Hence he promoted research and high standards in teaching in every university of South and Central America which he visited. Universities that he more frequently visited include Universidad Panamericana in Mexico, Universidad de Piura in Peru, and Universidad de la Sabana in Colombia.

=== Years of maturity (from 1982 to his death in 2013) ===
In 1982 Polo broke his silence in a paper called "The intellectual and the intelligible". There he makes explicit the Aristotelian roots of his proposal, highlighting the continuity of his philosophy with the Aristotelian tradition. He saw it as a "continuation of the study of knowledge just at the stage in which Aristotle left it". To that aim he set out to write his Theory of Knowledge in 5 volumes, the last two of which correspond to Being II.

In 1999 and 2003 he published his third and definitive work on philosophical anthropology (the former Being III and IV from 1972, and the old "Real Distinction" from 1952 being the previous versions), which came to light under the title Transcendental Anthropology I (1999) and II (2003).

These years of maturity have seen the publication of more than twenty books in a varied range of topics. Polo continued working in Pamplona (Spain) until his death in 2013.

Different universities and institutions worldwide (like the "Institute of Philosophical Studies 'Leonardo Polo'" in Málaga (Spain)) have organized meetings and symposia about his thought, and research is conducted and being spread to the present throughout books and articles which find their inspiration in his work.

== Summaries of Some of Polo's Works ==
His most important works are: Evidencia y realidad en Descartes (Evidence and Reality in Descartes), published in 1963, El acceso al ser, (Access to Being), in 1964, El ser I: La existencia extramental (Being I: Extramental Existence), in 1966, Curso de Teoría del Conocimiento, (Course of Theory of Knowledge), published in four volumes between 1984 and 1996), Hegel y el posthegelianismo (Hegel and Posthegelianism), in 1985, Antropología Trascendental I: La persona humana (Transcendental Anthropology I: Human Person), in 1999 and Antropología transcendental II: la esencia del hombre (Transcendental Anthropology II: Human Essence) in 2003.

=== El acceso al ser ===
This book expounds Polo's metaphysical method. Aristotle considered metaphysics the highest possible science because it deals with being, which is the ultimate constituent of everything. Modern metaphysicians, such as Descartes and Kant, understood that many of the pitfalls of metaphysics were caused by the lack of a rigorous method. Polo is sympathetic with Descartes and Kant about the need for such a method, but reflects that in metaphysics the method has to take us to grasp the being or existence of entities as such. If instead of that, our method leaves unresolved the question 'what is being?', its achievements will lead to perplexity. For Polo, such is the situation of Modern metaphysicians. When perplexed, the metaphysician finds himself in an awkward position, for he becomes blind to his own cognitive limits, and consequently has to put up with the suspicion that something in his system is missing without knowing exactly what.

Polo's response to perplexity gravitates on the need to overcome such limits. His method consists in acknowledging such limits without denying them. To take thinking to its limit is the only way in which this can be detected and laid bare for scrutiny. Only in that way such limits will become apparent to the philosopher. The task of El acceso al ser is to illuminate the mind's cognitive limits for knowing in such a way that these can be effectively overcome. He calls this method 'the abandonment of mental limit'.

With this a new and unsuspected perspective opens up. Being does not appear as perplexical as it might have appeared to philosophers like Hegel. The abandonment of the limit exposes the being of the universe as it is. This can be seen, on the one hand, as a kind of persistence; on the other, as a principle of continuity which provides the basis for the principle of non-contradiction. But looking at the universe one does not know why things are in the first place or why it exists. The reason is that the universe depends on a different principle called identity, and which is essentially God. Disconnect the world with that identity, and a large part of reality will lose its sense, for there is a third principle, the so-called transcendental causality which links up persistence and identity by placing the latter as creator of the former.

In this way, Polo thinks that Access to Being brings metaphysics back in its right historical track. Some medievals, and particularly Aquinas, conceived being as a transcendental, non-reducible notion. This method looks to do justice to their views.

=== Curso de Teoría del Conocimiento ===
This book is based on transcripts taken from the epistemology lectures which Polo delivered in the University of Navarra throughout the 80s, and that he corrected later on. The work contents are carefully distributed in four volumes, the last of which is divided in two parts. They are a much later and mature work in which Polo brings his discoveries in line with Aristotle's philosophy and systematises his views for the first time.

Starting from perceptual knowledge, it discusses internal faculties such as imagination, the abstraction and the following steps to the highest cognitive level, which is rational knowledge. As part of his concern for the method, Polo formulates a number of axioms which specify what is a cognitive act. The first and most relevant of these is the 'axiom of the act', which establishes that knowledge is active, as a consequence of which knowledge is an intentional and perfect act. Knowledge secures that character over real and constitutive existing acts such as those constituting a planet or a tiny virus. Knowledge, following Aristotle, is energeia or perfect act which in itself does not consist in any kind of substance, nor fits into the categories of space and time, as all existing objects do (see Aristotle's theory of potentiality and actuality).

Polo devises an epistemic difference between operations and habits of the mind. Habits are powerful cognitive acts which bring particular insights into real objects, whereas operations analyse and exploit the cognitive achievement of habits in successive stages as much as they can. As operations come to an end, only further habits can bring new light to them. In this way, the distinction between them grows bigger and more articulated the further the we progress beyond perceptual knowledge.

Habits are a direct exercise of the abandonment of the limit. While we all use some of them in ordinary life, i.e. so to be able to speak, not every one makes use of the highest available habits, which according to Polo illuminate unprecedented problems of philosophy such as the nature of first principles as examined in El acceso al ser.

Habits are sustained by operations. The distinction between operations and habits applies across cognitive faculties, framing concepts, linguistic and numerical abilities, and judgments. After the first abstracted object, reasoning can take two paths: it can generalise by organizing abstract objects into categories and subcategories, or it can follow a rational path that explores the connection between concepts and reality to form a judgment on the universal or particular nature of a thing.

Polo not only gives evidence of his views by discussing rival theories; he contrasts his views with that of Kant, Hegel and Heidegger. Kant's epistemology, while succeeding in systematising knowledge, presents perceptual knowledge as passive and so fails to comply with the requirements of axiom A, which asserts that knowledge is active. For Kant:

"perceptual knowledge is passive and yet the intellect is active. But if the intellect is active and perception is passive, the relation between both, if active, must be transitive. A transitive movement has suddenly crept into knowledge (...) as a kind of actio in passo, something which for Aristotle is paradigmatic of a physical action" (2nd ed. 1987, 70-1).

Similarly, the second volume of Polo's epistemology discusses a good deal of the concept of abstract objects for Heidegger, whereas the last volume explores the philosophical basis of 20th century physics.

=== Transcendental Anthropology ===
Polo had expressed in private conversations that his voluminous Theory of Knowledge had shed much light into his method, but that his work would be incomplete if he were not to canvass the habits which yield knowledge of the human essence and its singular act of being.

That is precisely the core of his Transcendental Anthropology (Antropología Trascendental), a science he believes is a transcendental philosophy of man – not taking 'transcendental' as synonym with a priori and opposed to 'empirical', as Kant would have taken it, but signifying the primacy of persons' being -.

Polo believes that throughout the centuries philosophical anthropology has been trumped by metaphysics. Say that metaphysics concerns the study of the universe and that philosophical anthropology focus on man. If we take man to be a bare metaphysical being in the sense in which Aristotle, Aquinas and some other medieval philosophers considered and defined it as a 'rational substance', we will find extremely hard to explain free will. For the notion of substance is intrinsically tied up to metaphysical necessity, so that its substance can be characterised as being per se or needing not the input of any other to subsist. Of course that does not imply that the being of that substance is absolutely necessary, because no creature can cause itself to be.

Human freedom, however, is incompatible with necessity. Modern philosophers understood it only too well when they asserted that man's essence consisted in spontaneity. This is certainly a feature of free will. In any choice, I may be bound by a limited number of alternatives on offer, but at the crucial point I am totally free to choose any of the alternatives regardless of my own inclinations. Freedom awaits us in any act of choice manifesting the radical openness of the will. For Polo, 'various distinctions must be settled in the first transcendental, that is, in the act of being (esse)' (I, p. 69). It is a mistake to call man 'free' once it has being called a 'substance', be it rational or not, for man is not a free-willed substance but a free-willed being. Thus, the distinction between the universe and man needs to be scaled up so as to work on a transcendental order. Human beings are different from comets, plants and animals not in external or accidental features, but at the level of what Aquinas would call actus essendi (act of being).

For Polo, the difference between the universe and man is this: Man is a co-being which co-exists with other co-existences. Man is the being existentially open to other acts of being: it co-exists with the being of the universe, with other human persons and, most importantly, with God. In its openness to others lies the dual character of its being, which makes the existence of a lonely person a metaphysical absurdity.

The ontological limits of a person do not have the sharper edges of other creatures’ beings. We conceive degrees of perfection in instruments such as a boiler depending on a variety of reasons, i.e. on how it fulfils or achieves some desirable purpose for which the instrument was crafted. A similar thing can be said of animals, in what they add up to sustaining biological life. The human being is equally open to perfection, but that increase, which is equally ruled by some purpose, is inherent to its act of being. Inasmuch as human beings co-exist with other co-beings, and especially with God, free will can grow.

Thus Polo conceives freedom not as sheer spontaneity, autonomous independence or lack of physical and psychological constraints, but in a new an unexpected sense: as being radically open to other beings. We may be tempted to think that a person’s relation with God is strictly causal, but that is only the case of the universe which in Access to Being was characterised as persistence. A person's unique dependence on God is the root of her freedom and hence, of an inward openness built on self-knowledge and self-giving. The person's call to openness is at the same time a call to be ontologically ever-more, that is, to be more human in accord with the moral, ethical, and practical implications of what is a 'good' person by nature, and which can only be found in an Aristotelian, non-utilitarian frame of objective values.

Polo proposes that 'openness', 'freedom', 'intellection' and 'love' are "human transcendentals." This means that there can only be a human being when these four properties are in place, although the number of these human transcendentals is not restricted to these four. What is important is that human transcendentals allow an anonymous being to co-exist and to be recognised among other co-existences like her. In this way, Polo overturns the classic doctrine of transcendentals, for which properties such as 'being', 'one', 'truth', 'good' and 'beauty' are universal and all-embracing, including human beings. But he argues that since persons are able to actively acquire those intrinsically static qualities and be intimately transformed by their achievement, human transcendentals substantially differ from the classic set of transcendentals.

== Polo's Complete Works ==
The following is a list of Leonardo Polo’s Complete Works as published by EUNSA.

=== Series A: Works published during his lifetime ===
- Vol. I: Evidencia y realidad en Descartes ISBN 978-8431330422
- Vol. II: El acceso al ser ISBN 978-84-313-3046-0
- Vol. III: El ser I: La existencia extramental ISBN 978-84-313-3047-7
- Vol. IV: Curso de teoría del conocimiento I ISBN 978-84-313-3054-5
- Vol. V: Curso de Teoría del Conocimiento II ISBN 978-84-313-3113-9
- Vol. VI: Curso de Teoría del Conocimiento III ISBN 978-84-313-3145-0
- Vol. VII: Curso de Teoría del Conocimiento IV ISBN 978-84-313-3343-0
- Vol. VIII: Hegel y el posthegelianismo ISBN 978-84-313-3260-0
- Vol. IX: Artículos (1951-1989) ISBN 978-84-313-3146-7
- Vol. X: Quien es el hombre. Presente y futuro del hombre ISBN 978-84-313-3128-3
- Vol. XI: Ethics ISBN 978-84-313-3257-0
- Vol. XII: Introducción a la filosofía ISBN 978-84-313-3061-3
- Vol. XIII: La persona humana y su crecimiento. La originalidad de la concepción cristiana de la existencia ISBN 978-84-313-3070-5
- Vol. XIV: Nominalismo, idealismo y realismo ISBN 978-84-313-3115-3
- Vol. XV: La antropología transcendental ISBN 978-84-313-3114-6
- Vol. XVI: Artículos (1990-2000) ISBN 978-84-313-3258-7
- Vol. XVII: Nietzsche como pensador de dualidades ISBN 978-84-313-3309-6
- Vol. XVIII: Antropología de la acción directiva. Ayudar a crecer. El hombre el la historia. ISBN 978-84-313-3344-7
- Vol XIX: Persona y libertad ISBN 978-84-313-3226-6
- Vol. XX: El conocimiento del universo físico ISBN 978-84-313-3085-9
- Vol. XXI: Curso de psicología general ISBN 978-84-313-3310-2
- Vol. XXII: Lecciones de psicología clásica ISBN 978-84-313-3064-4
- Vol. XXIII: La esencia del hombre ISBN 978-84-313-3091-0
- Vol. XXIV: Estudios de filosofía moderna y contemporánea ISBN 978-84-313-3069-9
- Vol. XXV: Filosofía y Economía ISBN 978-84-313-3099-6
- Vol. XXVI: Artículos (2001-2013) ISBN 978-84-313-3259-4
- Vol. XXVII: Epistemología, Creación y Divinidad ISBN 978-84-313-3078-1

=== Series B: Previously unpublished works ===
- Vol. XXVIII: Itinerario hacia la antropología trascendental (Tomo I) ISBN 978-84-313-3613-4
- Vol. XXIX: Itinerario hacia la antropología trascendental (Tomo II) ISBN 978-84-313-3614-1
- Vol. XXX: Artículos y conferencias ISBN 978-84-313-3719-3
- Vol. XXXI: Cursos y seminarios (Tomo I) ISBN 978-84-313-3737-7
- Vol. XXXII: Glosas a Nietzsche ISBN 978-84-313-3766-7
- Vol. XXXIII: Conversaciones con Leonardo Polo ISBN 978-84-313-3788-9
- Vol. XXXIV: Cursos y seminarios ISBN 978-84-313-3821-3
- Vol. XXXV: Escritos para la cátedra ISBN 978-84-313-3843-5
- Vol. XXXVI: La dignidad humana ante el futuro y otras entrevistas ISBN 978-84-313-3882-4
- Vol. XXXVII: Conferencias y textos breves ISBN 978-84-313-3900-5
- Vol. XXXVIII: Lecciones de teoría del conocimiento y antropología trascendental ISBN 978-84-313-3958-6
- Vol. XL: Textos críticos ISBN 978-84-313-3989-0

== Works about Polo ==
A bibliography of works about Polo and his philosophy can be found at Institute of Philosophical Studies "Leonardo Polo".
