= Peter Marzio =

- Born: May 8, 1943; Governors Island, New York
- Died: December 9, 2010 (aged 67); Houston, Texas
- Known for: Director of the Museum of Fine Arts, Houston

Peter Marzio was the former director of the Museum of Fine Arts, Houston for nearly 30 years. He oversaw major changes to the museum and was the author of three books.

== Early life and career ==
Peter Cort Marzio was born on May 8, 1943, on Governors Island outside of Manhattan. Marzio came from a working class Italian family. He worked as a gas station attendant as a teenager, and became the first in his family to attend college. Marzio attended Juniata College on an athletic scholarship, and received a Bachelor of Arts in 1965. Marzio went on to earn a doctorate in American history and art history from the University of Chicago in 1969. His dissertation concerned drawing manuals of the nineteenth century in the United States. Before his time at the Museum of Fine Arts, Marzio was an assistant professor at University of Maryland. In his time there he helped historian Daniel J. Boorstin with research for his Pulitzer Prize-winning book The Americans: The Democratic Experience. After this, Marzio served in various roles at the Smithsonian Institution (curator of prints and chairman of cultural history). He was a Woodrow Wilson Senior Fellow in 1973, and became director of the Corcoran Gallery of Art in 1978.

== Museum of Fine Arts, Houston ==
Marzio became the director of the Museum of Fine Arts, Houston in 1982. Under his leadership, the museum saw major changes in his 28 years. Marzio made a point of bringing art from different cultures into the museum's collection. He created specific departments for Asian and Latin American art. In 2001, he worked to establish the International Center for the Arts of the Americas. During his tenure the museum's collection increased from 14,000 to 62,000 works of art. Attendance grew from 380,000 to 2.5 million visitors, and the endowment grew from $25 million to a high of $1.2 billion in 2008. This success led to Marzio's becoming one of the highest paid non-profit CEOs–in 2008, Marzio was the 6th highest paid charity CEO, earning over $1 million in compensation that year. Marzio also oversaw the creation of a sculpture garden designed by Isamu Noguchi in 1986. Additionally, he contributed to the creation of the MFAH's Rienzi, a house museum on a four-and-a-half acre estate dedicated to European art donated by Henry Masterson III. For the Chinese gallery that Marzio created, he commissioned Cai Guo-Qiang to create a large and extravagant piece of art by using gunpowder in a live performance. Before his death, Marzio was planning a third building dedicated to the progression of art across various cultures. Marzio's work was acknowledged by directors across the country. James Cuno, director of the Art Institute of Chicago at the time, said of Marzio, "He was such a role model for all of us, a director whose priorities were the collection and the community. He inspired us, challenged us and helped us."

== Art author ==
In addition to his role as a museum director, Marzio wrote four books in his career. The most notable was an examination of the work of Rube Goldberg called The Art of Rube Goldberg which was met with critical acclaim in 1973. Additionally, Marzio wrote two books on lithography–in 1976, The Art Crusade: An Analysis of American Drawing Manuals, 1820–1860 and, in 1979, The Democratic Art—Pictures Pictures for a 19th-Century America: Chromolithography, 1840–1900.

== Death and legacy ==
Marzio died of cancer on December 9, 2010. Marzio left a large legacy on the Houston community. His death was announced and a moment of silence was held during a Monday Night Football game being played by the Houston Texans. In the acknowledgement, the public announcer of the game said Marzio "believed that the museum should be a place for all people." Kaywin Feldman, president of the board of trustees of the Association of Art Museum Directors said, upon hearing of Marzio's passing, "I think the era of the aloof, supercilious museum director has long passed, and that our jobs are much more about openness and accessibility." Marzio had served as president of the aforementioned association from 1988–1989. Before his death, he worked to have the annual conference for the American Association of Museums in May, 2011 come to Houston. The conference was held after his death and was dedicated to his memory.

== Bibliography ==
- Rube Goldberg: His Life and Works (Harper & Row, 1973).
- The Men and Machines of American Journalism: A Pictorial Essay from the Henry R. Luce Hall of News Reporting (Smithsonian Institution, 1973).
- The Art Crusade: An Analysis of American Drawing Manuals, 1820–1860 (Smithsonian Institution Press, 1976).
- The Democratic Art—Pictures Pictures for a 19th-Century America: Chromolithography, 1840–1900 (Amon Carter Museum of Western Art, 1979).
