= Elisa Villanueva Beard =

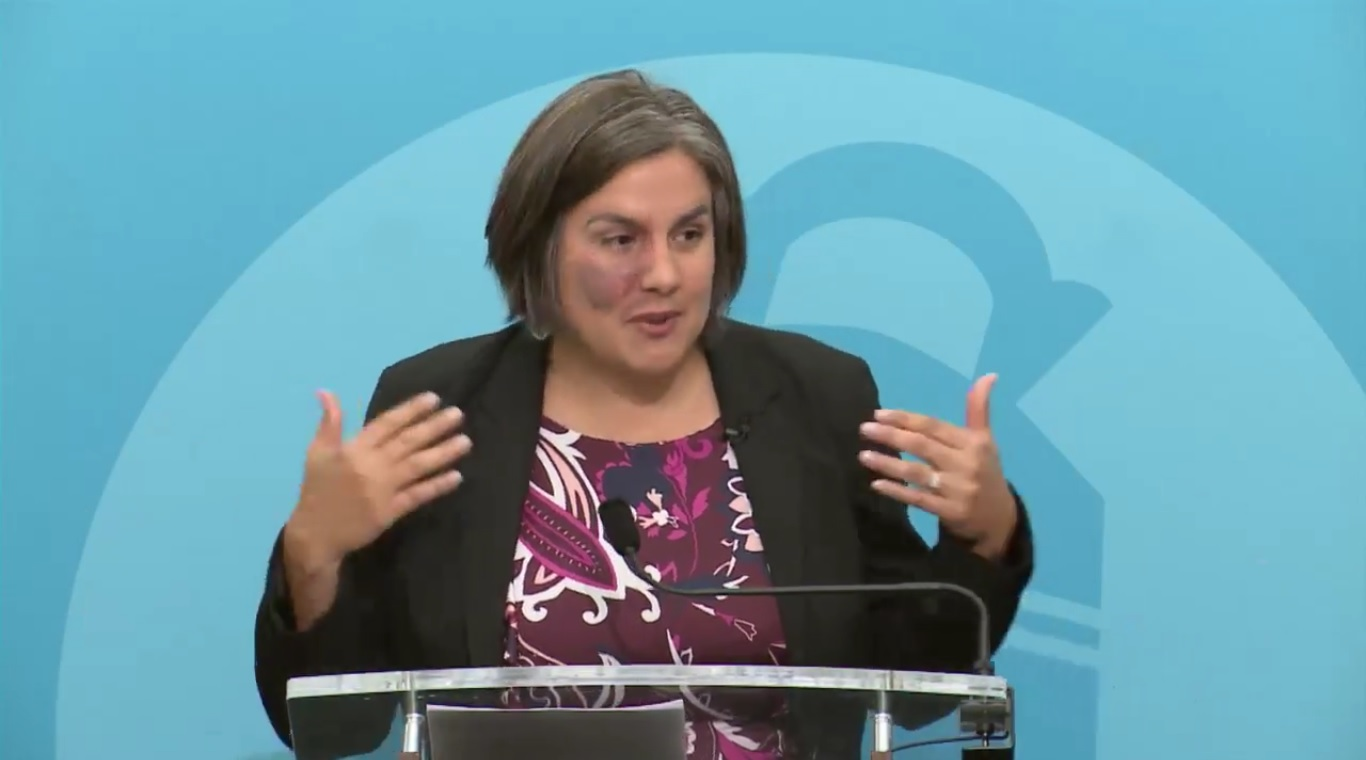
- Education: DePauw University (BA, 1998)
- Occupations: President and CEO, Houston Endowment Inc.
- Spouse: Jeremy Beard
- Children: 4

Elisa Villanueva Beard is the president and CEO of Houston Endowment Inc., a nonpartisan, private foundation founded in 1937 covering Greater Houston. Prior to this role, she was the CEO of Teach For America (TFA), a nonprofit organization dedicated to improving educational outcomes for low-income students across America. Villanueva Beard began her education career as a 1998 corps member of TFA, teaching first-grade and second-grade bilingual education.

== Background ==
Villanueva Beard grew up in the Rio Grande Valley in McAllen, Texas. She earned her bachelor's degree in sociology from DePauw University in 1998, where she was a member of the college's NCAA Division III basketball team. Villanueva Beard recalls being part of a small minority of Mexican American students and struggling academically when she first started college, despite graduating at the top of her high school class.

== Teach For America ==
After graduating from college, Villanueva Beard was a corps member with Teach For America (TFA), teaching first-grade and second-grade bilingual education in Phoenix, Arizona. After three years in the classroom, she became the leader of the organization's Rio Grande Valley region. Four years later, in 2005, Villanueva Beard was appointed TFA's Chief Operating Officer. As COO, Villanueva Beard played a key role in expanding the organization's field operations from 22 to 46 regions.

In 2013, Wendy Kopp transitioned out of the role of CEO of TFA, passing the leadership to co-CEOs Villanueva Beard and Matthew Kramer. In September 2015, Kramer stepped down from his position, and Villanueva Beard became the sole CEO of the organization.

In 2025, Aneesh Sohoni succeeded Villanueva Beard as the CEO of TFA.

== Houston Endowment ==
Following her 27-year tenure at TFA, Villanueva Beard was selected as the foundation’s seventh president and CEO, succeeding Ann B. Stern. She assumed the role on March 30, 2026.
