= The Seekers (Boorstin book) =

1998 non-fiction book by Daniel Boorstin

- Author: Daniel Boorstin
- Cover artist: Bernard Klein
- Language: English
- Subject: History
- Publisher: Random House
- Publication date: 1998
- Publication place: United States
- Media type: Print (hardcover
- Pages: 298 (hbk) 349 (pbk)
- ISBN: 0-375-70475-2 (pbk)
- Preceded by: The Creators

The Seekers is a 1998 non-fiction work of cultural history by Daniel Boorstin and is the third and final volume in the "knowledge" trilogy.

== Contents ==
The Seekers is subtitled The Story of Man's Continuing Quest to Understand His World. It is the story (or stories) of those within Western culture who have sought answers - many times without finding them. In A Personal Note to the Reader, Boorstin writes, Caught between two eternities- the vanished past and the unknown future - we never cease to seek our bearings and our sense of direction. We inherit our legacy of the sciences and the arts - works of the great Discoverers and Creators ... recounted in my earlier volumes. We glory in their discoveries and creations. But we are all Seekers. We all want to know why. Man is the asking animal... Unlike The Discoverers and The Creators this book does not chronicle discoveries, inventions and creations. Instead, various religious and philosophical Western thinkers are portrayed as are their attempts to seek in their own way. The work contains 41 separate vignettes, each dedicated to a seeker. They are grouped in eight parts that are divided into three books representing what Boorstin calls the three grand epochs of seeking.

=== Book One: An Ancient Heritage ===
Part I. The Way of Prophets: A Higher Authority

Part II. The Way of Philosophers: A Wondrous Instrument Within

Part III: The Christian Way: Experiments in Community

=== Book Two: Communal Search ===
Part IV. Ways of Discovery: In Search of Experience

Part V. The Liberal Way

=== Book Three: Paths To The Future ===
Part VI. The Momentum of History: Ways of Social Science

Part VII. The Sanctuaries of Doubt

Part VIII. A World In Process: The Meaning In The Seeking

== Praise and Criticism ==
The Seekers was both praised and criticized for its adulatory treatment of Western culture. Michael Lind, in a New York Times Book Review (Western Civ Fights Back), noted that Boorstin was "a secular, skeptical moderate, Northeastern liberal" yet offered a vigorous defense of Western civilization. He remarked that Boorstin might be signaling a new trend, since other liberals were also speaking out, particularly against what they considered excesses of ideology: multiculturalism, radical academia, political correctness and affirmative action to name a few. Roger Kimball of the Wall Street Journal praised his "formidable narrative gift and a great deal of common sense." Publishers Weekly wrote a laudatory review stating "...what Boorstin does so well is bring together many ideas that fertilize and cross-fertilize the reader's imagination and curiosity." Amazon.com, discussing Western intellectual development, asked, "What other author could put it so succinctly?" Harry Frumerman of The Library Journal described the book then added "The writing has a sweeping, didactic tone. A suitable but not mandatory choice for academic and larger public libraries."Amazon Editorial Reviews

== Book One: An Ancient Heritage ==
Boorstin notes that in the beginning we sought answers from special individuals - religious prophets. He begins with Moses, the first Prophet whose greatest contribution was not the Ten Commandments but the idea of monotheism and Israel's special relationship. Besides offering moral advice, the prophet addressed universal questions - "What is the purpose of life?" "What is the nature of God?" "Why does evil happen to good people?" More Old Testament prophets followed and the concept of Yahweh became more abstract. No longer did He reside in a physical place but was everywhere. Therefore, he was within each of us. Job is the prophetic answer to the question of evil in our world.

Ancient Greece gave us the philosopher: Socrates, Plato and Aristotle. One factor in the rise of philosophy was the transition from oral to written knowledge. Complex thoughts could be retained, referenced and augmented. Greek society was the first to celebrate the thinker, the rationalist and this questioning attitude became a hallmark of Western Civilization. Boorstin especially praises Aristotle for his searching and curious mind, his introduction of classification and his nascent hints at modern science. But more than that the state, I admire his appeal to common sense and experience. His academy was a place where people collected information about their world and ... came to conclusions ... Gergen, David Online Newshour: The Seekers

Christianity merged the Prophet and Philosopher creating theology and a new society. Monasteries arose in the West and Boorstin considers them the most influential institutions of the time, both preserving and spreading knowledge. From them came the university, yet another peculiarly Western institution. Finally, the Protestant Reformation gave individuals and not only institutions power, transforming congregations into participants. Humanism and democracy were its outgrowths.

== Book Two: Communal Search ==
Paradoxically, as seeking became individualized, attention turned to the specific community in which they dwelled for answers. In the forward he quotes Thomas Carlyle (approvingly): "the three great elements of modern civilization [are] gunpowder, printing and the Protestant religion." The Greek Homeric epics introduce mortals to the story and even the Gods have human motivations and reactions. Herodotus wrote the first history but elements of the epic remained. Thucydides and his history of the Peloponnesian War introduced a new field, political science. Others sought answers in the communal past - Virgil, Thomas More, Francis Bacon, Descartes.

In The Liberal Way Boorstin arrives at the modern world of classical liberalism - Machiavelli (the Italian way), John Locke (the English way of limited government), Voltaire and Rousseau (the French way of liberation), Thomas Jefferson (the American experiment), Hegel (the ideal German) - each sought meaning within the framework of their own society. All sought to define the individual within the framework of society and increasingly, the State.

== Book Three: Paths to the Future ==
Modern seekers abandoned traditional sources of meaning such as nations or religion and found or invented new sources. In France the Marquis de Concorcet rejected religion and power in individuals. Instead, mass movements were expounded as a new wave. The result was the French Revolution yet he died in jail, victim of his own teachings. Auguste Comte developed Positivism, a system in which only sensory experiences were the true reality. Related to this was historical determinism in which progress occurs by outside forces unrelated to human actions. From these two arose Ideology, a belief that the ideas expressed were true because they could be "proven". Individuals lost not only influence but also meaning. Boorstin strongly opposed ideology... the people who think they have found the final answer...are the menace to our humanity really, because I think there is no final answer. Gergen, David Online Newshour: The Seekers He first warned of the dangers of ideology in 1953 in The Genius of American Politics. In an interview with PBS he says Jefferson's greatness stems from his non-ideological nature and refusal to develop a political theory.PBS Interview

Ideology eventually led to the modern totalitarian state. Spengler and Toynbee sought answers in culture which displaced the nation state. Cultures could be studied and analyzed scientifically so were better models for comparison. Others looked for new meaning in violent revolution, particularly the Soviet model. Steinbeck, Hemingway, John Reed, Lincoln Steffens and others praised the new State. Kierkegaard found meaning not in history but in religious Existentialism wherein doubt was as necessary as faith. Seekers of truth in literature wrote in new ways and a stream of consciousness style emerged. Others found solace in diversity - Edward Wilson in biodiversity, Oliver Wendell Holmes in diversity of opinion.

Seekers grew disenchanted with scientific history and materialism. They created process philosophy which found meaning in the act of seeking, not in the final goal. Lord Acton, an English politician, tried to reconcile authoritarian Catholicism with liberty which he considered a process rather than a destination. Malraux looked outside Western absolutes for answers in art, literature and revolution. Henri Bergson sought to explain life processes and particularly evolution (a grand process) in philosophical and physiological terms, declaring true meaning is found within the process. Boorstin concludes with Einstein who searched for ultimate truth in the cosmological unity of universal laws.

== Quotes ==
...history was a literary art, because in history the subject and its audience were one. The effective historian is always telling us about ourselves... The Seekers

This problem...haunted Western thought—Why would a good God allow evil in the world He had created? -- was one that Judeo-Christian man had made for himself. It was plainly a by-product of ethical monotheism...The Seekers

Dogmas of social science would...eventually be embodied in institutions whose mission it was to enforce a frozen ideology The Seekers

...the Seekers who left the most durable imprint on Western history are those who embodied the mystery of their achievement in their lives - and their deaths The Seekers

...there has been no greater obstacle to his [mankind's] learning than the stock of accumulated knowledge. The Seekers

...ideology itself is a contradiction and denial of man's endless powers of novelty and change which are suggested by the very idea of progress. NPQ
