= The Discoverers =

Book by Daniel J. Boorstin

- Author: Daniel Boorstin
- Cover artist: Robert Aulicino
- Language: English
- Genre: Historical
- Publisher: Random House
- Publication date: 1983
- Publication place: United States
- Media type: Print (hardcover and paperback)
- Pages: 745
- ISBN: 978-0-394-72625-0 (hbk) 0-394-72625-1 (pbk)
- OCLC: 11399771
- Followed by: The Creators

The Discoverers is a non-fiction historical work by Daniel Boorstin, published in 1983, and is the first in the Knowledge Trilogy, which also includes The Creators and The Seekers. The book, subtitled A History of Man's Search to Know His World and Himself, is a history of human discovery. Discovery in many forms is described: exploration, science, medicine, mathematics, and more-theoretical ones, such as time, evolution, plate tectonics, and relativity. Boorstin praises the inventive, human mind and its eternal quest to discover the universe and humanity's place in it.

In "A Personal Note to the Reader", Boorstin writes "My hero is Man, the Discoverer. The world we now view from the literate West ... had to be opened by countless Columbuses. In the deep recesses of the past, they remain anonymous." The structure of the book is topical and chronological, beginning in the prehistoric era in Babylon and Egypt.

== Themes ==
The Discoverers (as well as The Creators and The Seekers) resonates with tales of individuals, their lives, beliefs and accomplishments. They form the building blocks of his tale and from them flow descriptions and commentary on historical events. In this respect he is like other historians (David McCullough, Paul Johnson, Louis Hartz and Richard Hofstadter, to name a few) who give prominence to the individual and the incremental approach to history. Thus, in the chapter "In Search of the Missing Link", he features Edward Tyson and his contributions in comparative anatomy. Tycho Brahe, the Danish astronomer, is the guiding light in "The Witness of the Naked Eye" and Isaac Newton merits an entire chapter ("God said, Let Newton Be!") devoted to his life and accomplishments.

The role of religion and culture is another recurring theme. Boorstin, a reform Jew, has been described as a "secular, skeptical moderate Northeastern liberal of the New Deal rather than the New Left school." The purpose of religion (and God) was not personal salvation but establishing a societal anchor that inspired public morality.

He suggests that Jews and Christians, primarily from Western Europe, came to believe that the Creator wished them to unravel the secrets of His universe. Scientific research, discovery and education became intertwined with the moral good and were elevated to lofty goals within Western societies. Conversely, Hindus did not explore the seas due to the caste system (some were forbidden to travel over salt water), Muslims became satisfied with the Arabian status quo and China, with an increasingly weak central government, lost its drive for exploration and withdrew to its own borders. Most importantly, the active public dissemination of scientific knowledge – geographical, cosmological, medical, mechanical, anthropological – never became common practice outside the Judeo-Christian world. China, for example, only allowed the ruling class indulgence in scientific ventures.

A third theme is the role of tradition and experience in shaping mankind's history. Throughout the work he demonstrates how the discoveries of one individual are built upon the efforts of those who came before. This long chain of incremental improvements – one generation improving or amplifying the results of previous generations – contrasts sharply with the idea of overthrowing the current order and replacing it with revolutionary ideas originating not in experience but in ideology. Once a member of the Communist Party in the 1930s he grew to distrust all forms of fanaticism and political ideology and sought to show how such fanaticism was always detrimental to human progress.

"I have observed that the world has suffered far less from ignorance than from pretensions to knowledge. It is not skeptics or explorers but fanatics and ideologues who menace decency and progress. No agnostic ever burned anyone at the stake or tortured a pagan, a heretic, or an unbeliever." People, not movements, were the driving force of human progress. He became an exponent of tradition, wary of the implications of multiculturalism and along with Arthur M. Schlesinger, Jr and Brian Barry wrote of potential dangers it posed to a continuing liberal society.

Despite the fact that he served as director of the Smithsonian National Museum of History and Technology, he was a sharp critic of what he perceived as the institution's growing political correctness. After viewing the controversial exhibit, The West as America: Reinterpreting Images of the Frontier, 1820-1920 (1991) he left the following in the comment book: "A perverse, historically inaccurate, destructive exhibit. No credit to the Smithsonian." In 1975, he resigned as President of the American Studies Association after an attempt was made to inject radical politics into the scholarly body.

== Criticism ==
Boorstin's book, particularly chapter 14, "A Flat Earth Returns", perpetuates the misconception that medieval intellectuals took the world to be flat. "In fact," writes Louise M. Bishop, "virtually every thinker and writer of the thousand year medieval period affirmed the spherical shape of the earth."

Boorstin's writing has been praised, but he has also had his critics. He has been called conservative, biased toward Western culture to the exclusion of other cultures, nationalistic and even postmodern. This latter term is surprising since Boorstin often railed against many postmodern impulses – multiculturalism, political correctness, reverse discrimination and ideological politics. As a postmodern writer, he grasped the new reality created by media, what he called "image reality" in which the vehicle (newspaper, book, movie, television show, billboard) assumes more importance than the reality it portrays or describes. This new reality can be described as a type of deconstructionism, a movement Boorstin opposed for that very reason. He continually praises "true" heroes like Christopher Columbus, Isaac Newton and Madame Curie while questioning image-crafted politicians, entertainers, academics and sports "heroes". He exalts genuine discoveries (calendar, printing press, medicine) and bemoans media-driven ones of the modern age. His works, therefore, emphasize such "pre-image" concepts as the importance of the individuals, family, tradition, religion, capitalism and democracy.

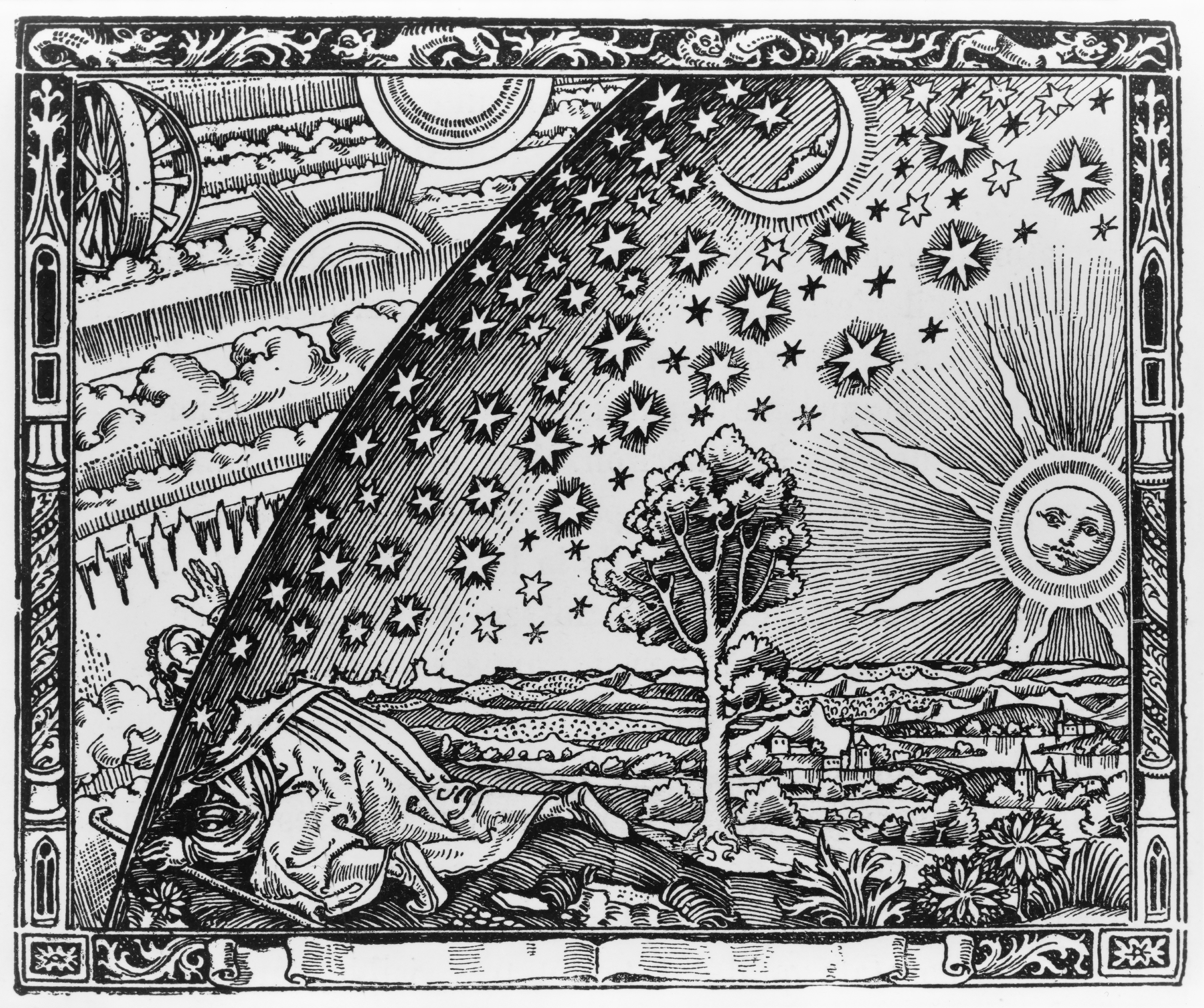

Some people have alleged that the book's cover which has a colorized version of an image by Flammarion (made in the style of a woodcut), is used to promote the view that medieval Christianity was anti-scientific. The jacket credits the Bettman Archive for the picture, which describes it as "based on a 16th Century Woodcut".
