= The Creators (book) =

1992 history book by Daniel Boorstin

- Author: Daniel Boorstin
- Cover artist: Bernard Klein
- Language: English
- Genre: Historical
- Publisher: Random House
- Publication date: 1992
- Publication place: United States
- Media type: Print (hardcover)
- Pages: 811
- ISBN: 0-394-54395-5 (hbk)
- OCLC: 24846950
- Dewey Decimal: 909 20
- LC Class: CB69 .B65 1992
- Preceded by: The Discoverers
- Followed by: The Seekers

The Creators: A History of Heroes of the Imagination is a non-fiction work of cultural history by Daniel Boorstin published in 1992. It was preceded by The Discoverers and succeeded by The Seekers.

The Creators is put forward as the story of mankind's creativity. It highlights great works of art, music and literature.

The Creators was criticized by the Washington Post for factual mistakes, poor research, literary ignorance, incorrect conclusions, a bias toward Western culture to the exclusion of other cultures, a tendency to overlook the negative, lack of attribution, and visibly sloppy proofreading and editing. The New York Times noted the book's subjective nature - "he tends to write about what interests him and to omit what does not" - while calling it "a remarkable achievement and a pleasure to read." Kenneth S. Lynn, a Harvard professor of history, accused Boorstin of philosophical bias and blatant myth-making.
