= Audrey Jones Beck =

American art collector and philanthropist

- Born: March 27, 1924; Houston, Texas
- Died: August 22, 2003 (aged 79)
- Education: Mount Vernon College; University of Texas at Austin
- Occupations: Art collector and philanthropist
- Known for: Art collection
- Relatives: Jesse H. Jones (grandfather)

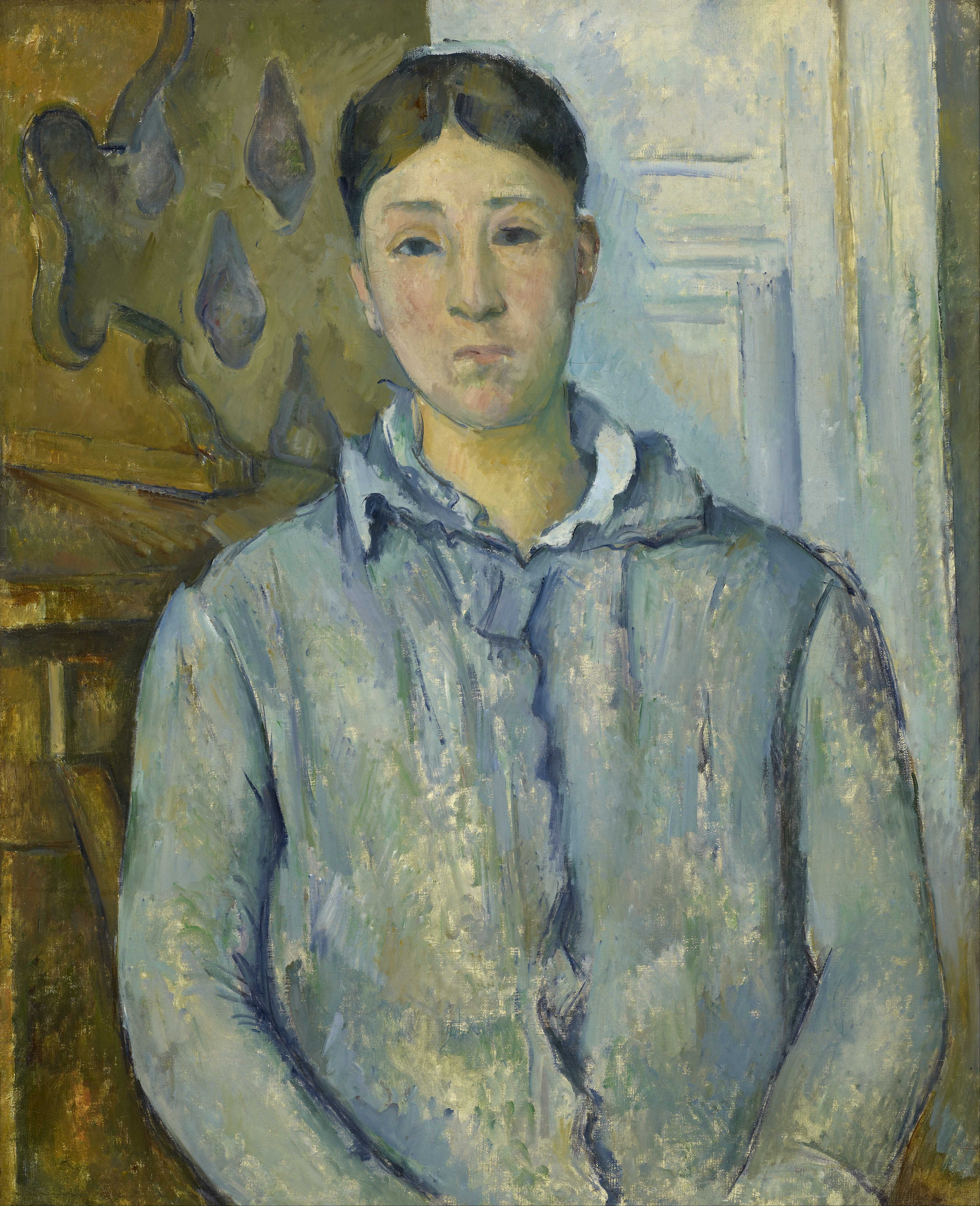
Paul Cézanne, Madame Cézanne in Blue (1890), oil on canvas, 99.5 x 61 cm (39 x 24 in), Museum of Fine Arts, Houston

Audrey Jones Beck (March 27, 1924 – August 22, 2003) was an American art collector and philanthropist who donated her personal art collection to the Museum of Fine Arts, Houston. The John A. and Audrey Jones Beck Collection included impressionist and post-impressionist paintings, and the museum named its Audrey Jones Beck Building in her honor.

== Life ==
Audrey Jones Beck was born in Houston, Texas, on March 27, 1922. She was the granddaughter of Houston entrepreneur Jesse H. Jones. Audrey attended The Kinkaid School, in Houston, Mount Vernon Seminary and College in Washington D.C., and the University of Texas at Austin. She met Ensign John Beck in 1941, and they were married eight months later at Christ Church Cathedral (Houston). She lived in Washington, D.C., with her grandparents for part of her childhood, where Jesse Jones served as United States secretary of commerce and head of the Reconstruction Finance Corporation. "She spent a lot of time with the Roosevelts at the White House," said Steven Fenberg, of the Houston Endowment Inc. "Will Rogers was her grandfather's best friend."

According to Beck, she first encountered impressionism when she visited Europe as a 16-year-old, and that while she "paid homage to the Mona Lisa and the Venus de Milo [...] the imaginative and colorful Impressionist paintings came as a total surprise." She noted the relative scarcity of impressionist art in American museums during those years, and called the paintings the "epitome of artistic freedom" and a "visual delight". The first painting she acquired was a landscape with figures by Jean-Honoré Fragonard, purchased in Paris in 1938 at the age of 16. But she was drawn to impressionism and gave the Fragonard to a friend, and began to focus on French painting from 1870 and 1930.

In 1960 she joined the board of Houston Endowment, a charitable foundation founded by her grandparents, where she was involved with causes such as annual scholarship programs and animal welfare. The Houston Humane Society's Audrey Jones Beck Adoption Center was named in her honor. Beck was a founding trustees of the Houston Grand Opera, the Houston Ballet, and a trustee of the Houston Symphony Society. However, Houston did not have a strong tradition of philanthropy in the visual arts at that time and there were few examples for her to follow. "The earliest wealthy people here just didn't collect painting and sculpture." said Peter Marzio, director of the Museum of Fine Arts, Houston (MFAH). Before she began donating paintings to the museum, the collection was displayed in her home where she and her husband John, made it available to students of Rice University and the University of Houston. Braque, Derain, Modigliani, and others were exhibited in the living room and around the house. The Becks were very generous about letting people in to study and enjoy the collection. In the fall of 1973 John Beck died and his passing ended her interest in having the collection in her home.

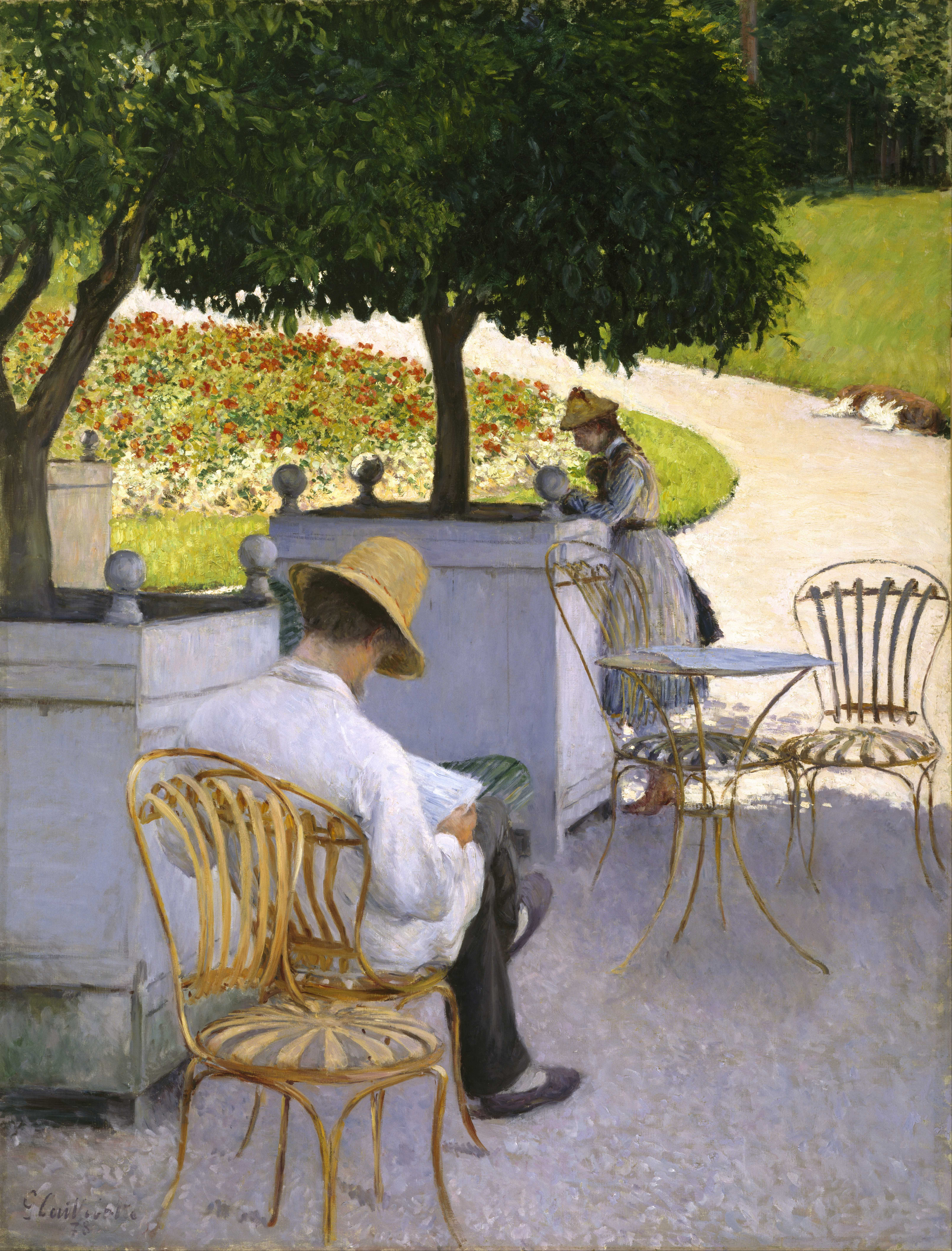
Gustave Caillebotte, The Orange Trees (1878), oil on canvas, 155 x 117 cm (61 x 46 in), Museum of Fine Arts, Houston

Beck was a civic-minded native of Houston and a lifelong student of art history. She had wealth, knowledge, sophistication and wit, but she was never really a socialite. In fact, she was known to be an intensely private person, shunning notoriety, photographers, and publicity. "When she gave money, she did not want to be recognized," said Jack S. Blanton. "It brought great joy to her life, getting to know about art, buying art, and giving art." said Isabelle Wilson, chairman of the MFAH board. Beck "was probably one of Houston's most remarkable and unknown citizens," said Steven Fenberg, of the Houston Endowment Inc. As a board member of The Houston Endowment, she donated $20 million of the $85 million for a new building on the museum's campus. However, when the building opened in 2000, many people were surprised that she even attended the opening events. "I think she was the best-kept secret in Houston," said Alfred C. Glassell Jr., former MFAH board chairman.

The Becks bought a cottage, sometimes referred to as the "Hansel and Gretel" house, from Joseph Strauss (Golden Gate Bridge architect) on Belvedere Island, California, just north of San Francisco in 1965. The house incorporated bricks recovered from the 1906 San Francisco earthquake, as well as doors, wooden beams, and other materials taken from old sailing ships. Although John died a few years later, for rest of her life, Audrey Beck escaped the oppressive summer heat of Texas and the gulf coast humidity of Houston at the cottage, overlooking San Francisco, the Golden Gate Bridge, and Mount Tamalpais. Beck was known for her love of plants, animals, and gardens, as well as art, and by the time she died, she had built up the gardens there. Its official name is the Audrey Jones Beck Cottage and it was entered into the Belvedere register of historic homes in 1997.

In her later years, Audrey Beck rarely ventured out, but often entertain friends at her home. Audrey Beck was diagnosed with cancer just a few weeks before she died in 2003. In addition to the art collection, the philanthropist and art historian bequeathed both the California and Houston houses to the Fine Arts Museum, Houston, which were later sold for funds.

== Audrey Jones Beck Building ==
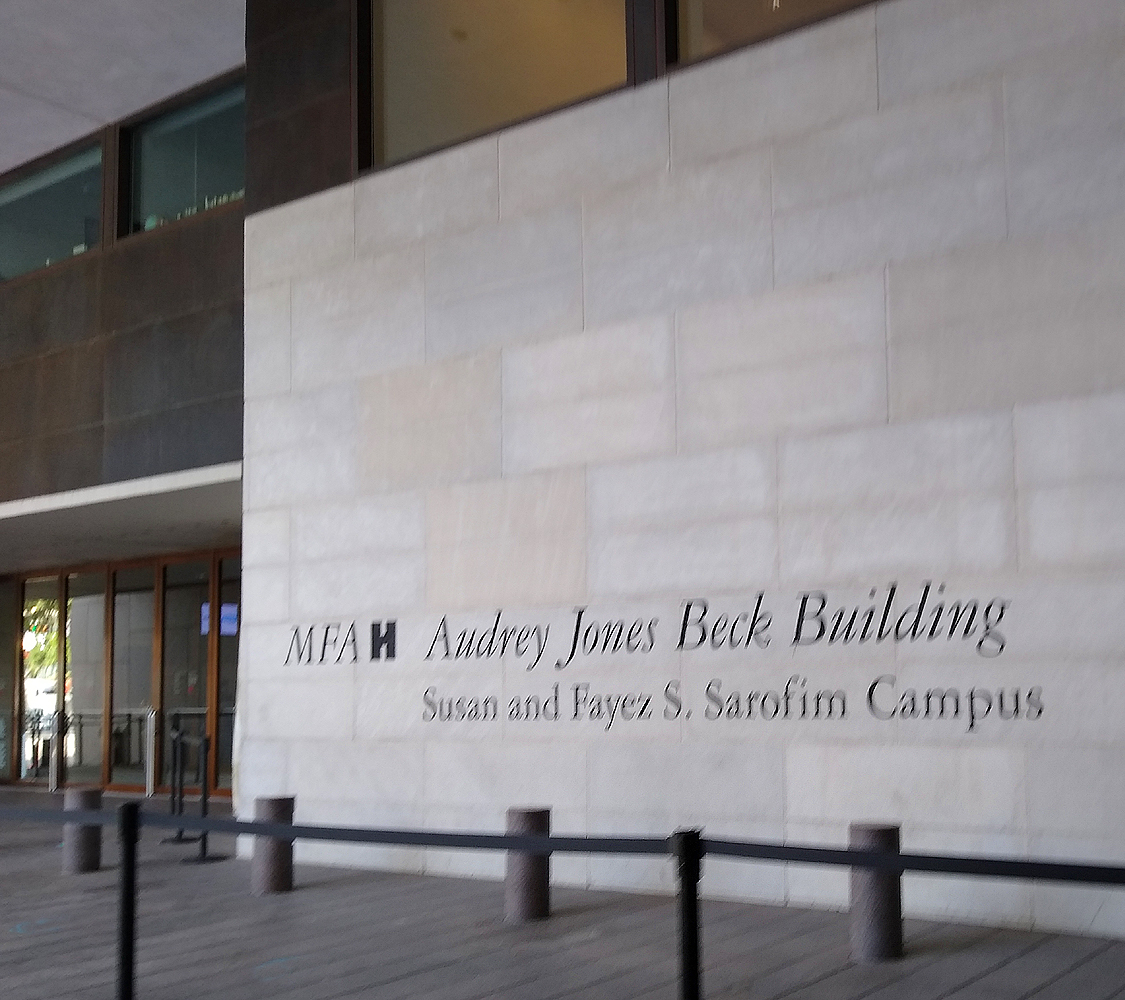
Entrance to the Audrey Jones Beck building, Museum of Fine Arts, Houston

The Audrey Jones Beck Building was designed by architect Rafael Moneo and opened to the public in 2000. It houses 158,150 ft² (14,693 m²) of galleries for the museum's permanent collection of antiquities, European painting and sculpture to 1900, American art, as well as temporary exhibitions. The Beck building makes intense use of natural light to illuminate the galleries. "The roof becomes the most characteristic image of the museum, showing the importance given to the light, the real protagonist of an architecture whose substance is found in the interior space." It is one of several buildings on the Museum of Fine Arts, Houston campus, and one of the three primary exhibition spaces open to the public. The Beck building is joined to the Kinder Building with 20th-21st century art, and the Wiess Law Building of Asian, African, oceanic, and Pre-Columbian art, by an underground tunnel featuring the permanent installation of James Turrell's, The Light Inside (1999).

== The Beck collection ==
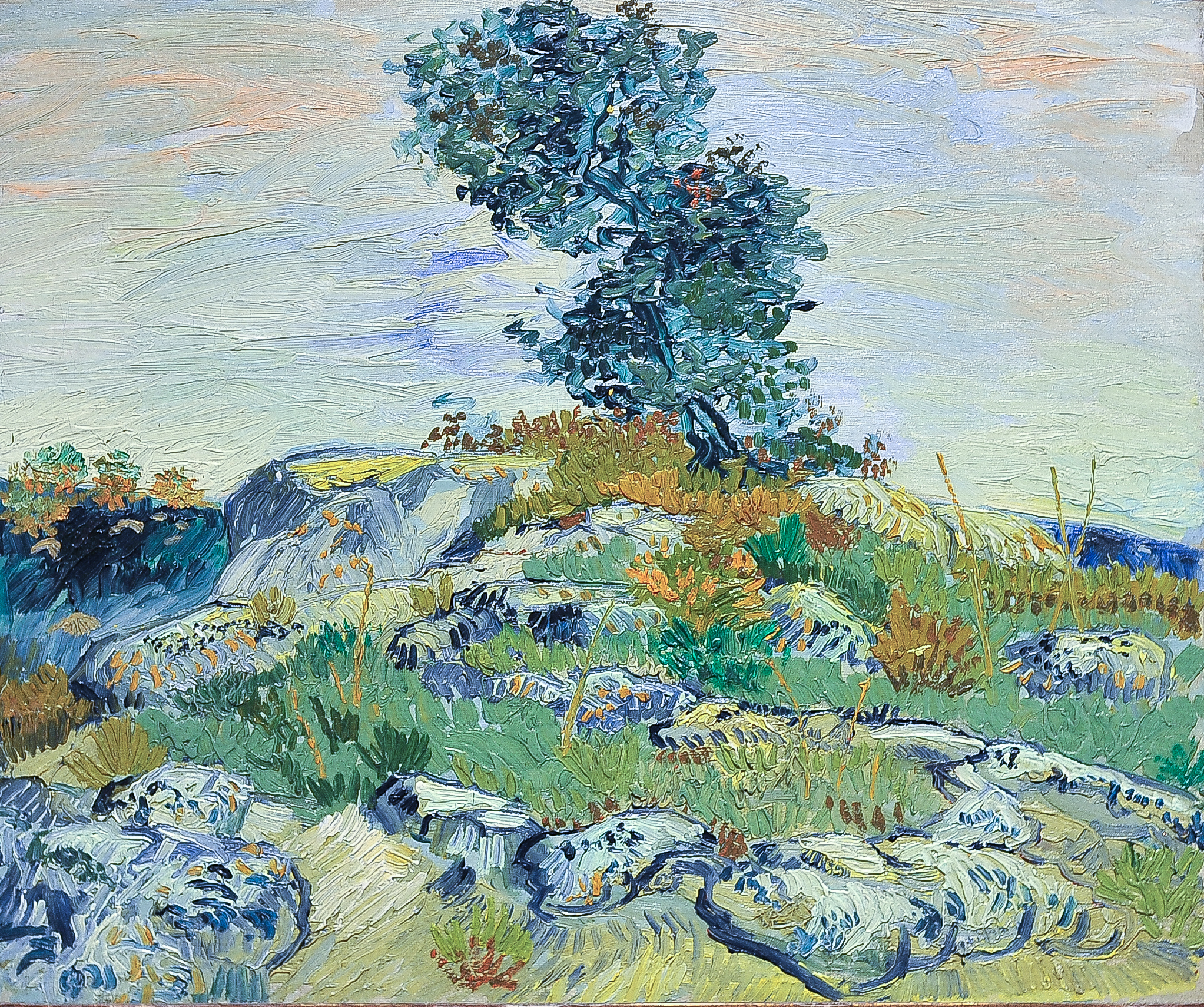
Vincent van Gogh, The Rocks (1888), is one of well over 150 works of art that Beck donated to the Museum of Fine Arts, Houston.

The Beck collection is an important foundation of the Museum of Fine Arts, Houston's permanent collection. The collection predominantly includes late 19th and early 20th century art, with a focus on impressionism, post impressionism, early modern French painting, and the School of Paris. Examples of Egyptian antiquities, Asian porcelain and decorative arts, antique American silver, and early to mid 19th century American photography are also included.

Artist and art movements in the Beck collection include representative examples of realist and en plein air painters such as Eugène Boudin, and Honoré Daumier. Impressionist painters include Mary Cassatt, Edgar Degas, Édouard Manet, Claude Monet, Berthe Morisot, Camille Pissarro, Pierre-Auguste Renoir, Alfred Sisley, and others. A gallery of neo-impressionism (pointillism) exhibits the paintings of Henri-Edmond Cross, Maximilien Luce, Georges Seurat, Paul Signac and several other members of the movement. Post-Impressionists include Pierre Bonnard, Paul Cézanne, Paul Gauguin, Henri de Toulouse-Lautrec, Vincent van Gogh, Édouard Vuillard, and many others. The Fauvist collection is near encyclopedic, including paintings by Georges Braque, André Derain, Raoul Dufy, Henri Matisse, Maurice de Vlaminck, and more. A few examples of symbolism (e.g. Odilon Redon), expressionism (e.g. Ernst Ludwig Kirchner), Cubism (e.g. Georges Braque), are also included in the collection, as are works by Marc Chagall, Alexej von Jawlensky, Vasily Kandinsky, František Kupka, Amedeo Modigliani, Georges Rouault, Henri Rousseau, and Chaïm Soutine.

As a collector, Beck often dared to seek out the work of lesser-known artist and wanted their finest work represented in the collection. Some were relatively unknown when she bought them. Artist like Albert André were not often be seen in museums at that time. Her first bequest to the museum was View of the Seine, Paris (1871), by Jean-Baptiste Armand Guillaumin in 1971. She remained a lifetime trustee of the MFAH and she continued to acquire paintings and build the collection up to the last year of her life. Peter Marzio said. "She always thought of it as a teaching collection." She aspired to assemble a representative collection of the era, exhibiting the full depth and scope of the period to people who knew little about art and impressionism.

== John A. and Audrey Jones Beck House ==
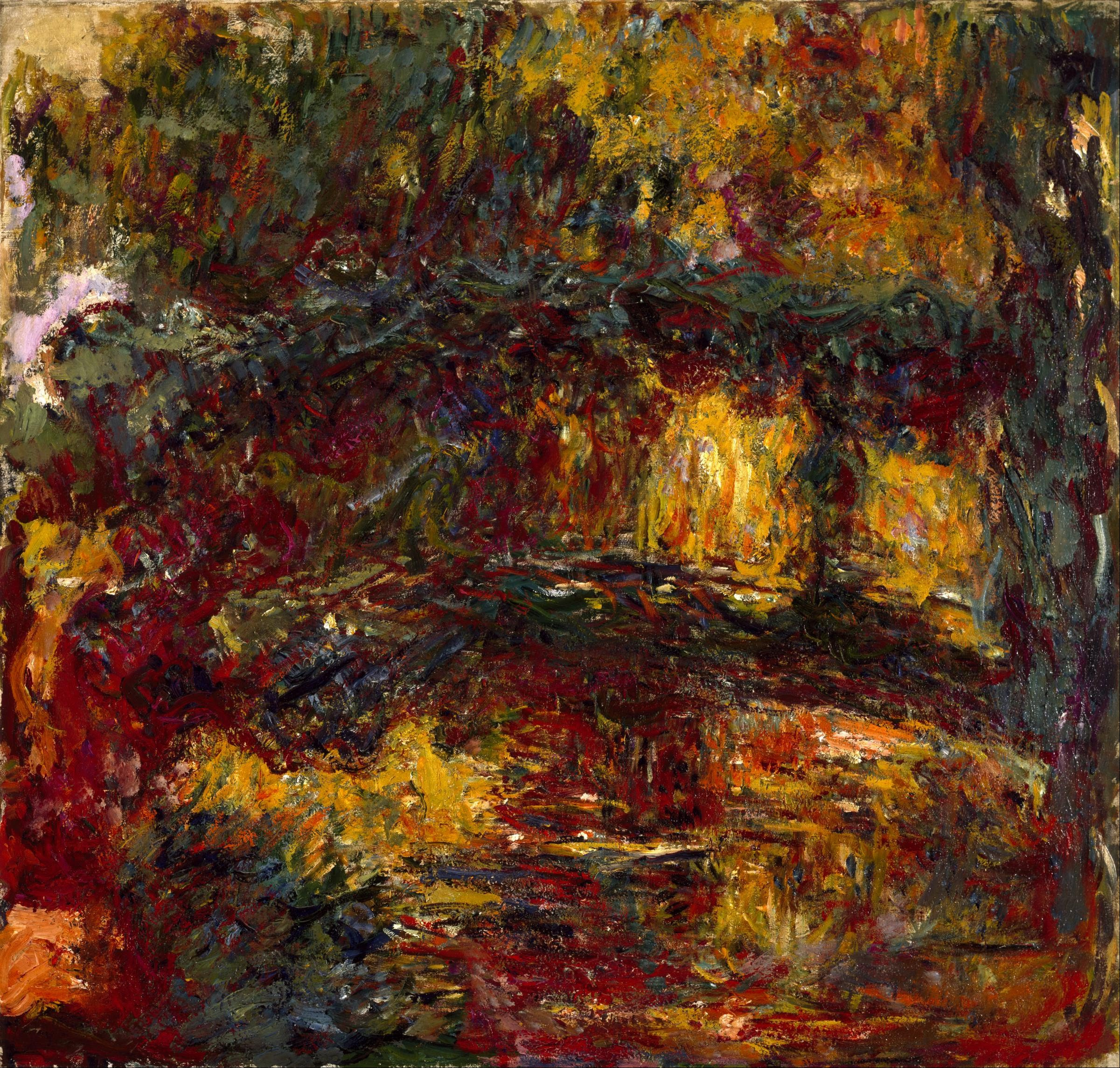
Claude Monet, The Japanese Footbridge, Giverny (1820-24), oil on canvas, 89 x 94 cm (35 x 37 in), Museum of Fine Arts, Houston

The John A. and Audrey Jones Beck home was designated a Landmark by the City of Houston, Archaeological & Historical Commission in 2006. The house was originally designed and constructed in 1948–1950 by the Wilson, Morris & Crain architects of Houston, noted designers of the Astrodome (1962). It was later remodeled with the addition of a two-story "Great Hall" in 1960 by the same architectural firm. The Beck House integrates stylistic elements of English Tudor as well as French Norman architectural examples. The two story house is constructed with a masonry first floor and a wooden upper story, featuring an unusual side main entry. It is located in the River Oaks area of Houston and privately situated at the back of the lot behind trees, and not easily viewed from the street. Although the house has been designated as an historical landmark by the City of Houston, it is currently a private residence and not open to the public.

== Audrey Jones Beck Papers and Memorabilia ==
The Audrey Jones Beck Papers and Memorabilia are archived at the Woodson Research Center, Rice University, Houston, Texas. The archives include 52 linear feet (16 m) of family records, photographs, artifacts, correspondence, documents on philanthropy, and Museum of Fine Arts Houston records, spanning from 1860 to 2004.
