= Julia Boorstin =

American news reporter

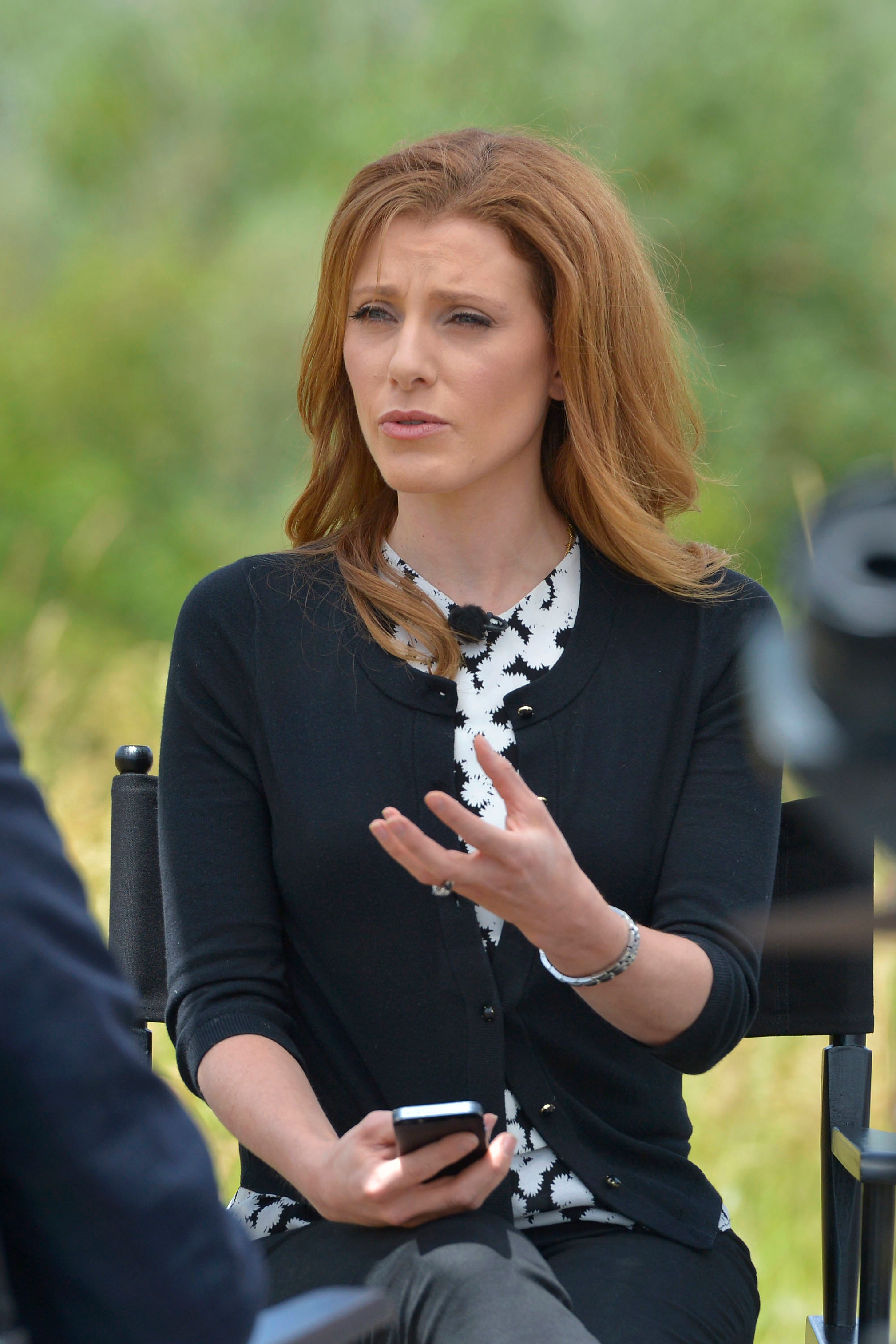
- Boorstin interviewing U.S. Secretary of Defense Ash Carter in July 2015
- Born: Julia Boorstin
- Education: Princeton University (BA)
- Employer: CNBC
- Spouse: William Couper Samuelson (m. 2007)
- Children: 2
- Relatives: Daniel J. Boorstin (grandfather)
- Website: juliaboorstin.com

Julia Boorstin Samuelson is an American news correspondent, reporter and author. Since 2006, Boorstin has been reporter and the Senior Media & Tech Correspondent for CNBC, focussing on new media and technology.

== Early life and education ==
Julia Boorstin is the daughter of Paul and Sharon Boorstin. Her father is a screenwriter and producer for film and television such as the series Hart to Hart (1982) and Fame (1982), and the film Fire with Fire (1986). Her mother, Sharon Boorstin, is an author. Julia Boorstin's late grandfather was the Pulitzer-winning historian Daniel J. Boorstin (1914-2004). Her grandmother, Ruth Frankel (1917-2013), was a published poet and reviewed books for The New York Times in the 1940s in addition to helping to edit her husband Daniel's academic writing.

She attended the Harvard-Westlake School in Los Angeles. In 2000, Boorstin graduated with honors from Princeton University with a Bachelor of Arts degree in history. While studying at Princeton, she was an editor at the Princeton student newspaper The Daily Princetonian. After finishing her degree at Princeton, Boorstin had planned to study at the London School of Economics but instead decided to work for a year at Fortune.

== Career ==
=== Fortune ===
In June 2000, Boorstin joined Fortune as a business writer. There, she wrote on topics such as media companies, retail and business trends.

=== CNBC ===
Boorstin first joined CNBC in May 2006 as a general assignment reporter and news correspondent. In December 2006, she became the new media and entertainment reporter for CNBC's Los Angeles bureau. Soon after joining CNBC, Boorstin told her boss that she wanted to report on a then-newly established, small company called Facebook, though he wasn't entirely convinced of the importance of Facebook as a company.

In 2013, Boorstin created the CNBC Disruptor 50 list, an annual list that highlights economically transformative private companies that are challenging established industries.

In September 2023, an interview that Boorstin conducted with Twitter CEO Linda Yaccarino at Vox Media's Code conference went viral for Yaccarino's inability to answer questions. Boorstin pushed Yaccarino to provide quantifiable numbers for Twitter's daily users and loss of advertisers. Yaccarino was asked by Boorstin if she was merely acting as "CEO in name only" with Elon Musk actually making key decisions at Twitter and overseeing product development. Boorstin contrasted Meta's product team which reported to CEO Mark Zuckerberg to Twitter's product team which reported to Elon Musk. Yaccarino waived away the notion that she was in more of a COO role at Twitter and responded with "Yeah, not nice".

=== Writing ===
Boorstin's first book When Women Lead: What They Achieve, Why They Succeed, and How We Can Learn from Them was published by Simon & Schuster on October 11, 2022. In the book, Boorstin discusses the stories of over sixty female CEOs and business leaders, including interviews with businesswomen like Stitch Fix founder Katrina Lake and Bumble founder Whitney Wolfe Herd. Boorstin said that the book has relevance as "women have been hit so hard by the pandemic" and barriers to women remain as "pay gaps have not made any progress toward closing". When Women Lead was included in Tatler's list of "must-read non-fiction books" in 2023.

== Personal life ==
Boorstin met her husband Couper Samuelson at the Sundance Film Festival in January 2004. They married on December 16, 2007, in Beverly Hills.

== Accolades ==
Boorstin was nominated for a 2023-2024 News & Documentary Emmy Award for her contribution to NBC Nightly News with Lester Holt.

In 2003, 2004 and 2006, The Journalist and Financial Reporting newsletter included Boorstin in their "TJFR 30 under 30" list of the most promising business journalists under 30 years old.
