= The Image: A Guide to Pseudo-events in America =

1962 book by Daniel J. Boorstin

- Author: Daniel J. Boorstin
- Language: English
- Published: 1962
- Publication place: United States

The Image: A Guide to Pseudo-events in America is a 1962 book by the political historian Daniel J. Boorstin. In his book, Boorstin argues that Americans have a false "image" of what "news" actually is. He argues that Americans mistake certain "pseudo-events" for real news, when in fact they are the contrivances of politicians and the news media.

== Summary of contents ==
The Image begins by noting that Americans have "extravagant expectations" when it comes to their news consumption. To a degree, they demand to be entertained. Truly important, naturally occurring news stories, however, do not occur regularly or predictably—there may be droughts of newsworthy stories. In order to "fill the gap," news outlets report what Boorstin calls "pseudo-events."

Pseudo-events are political spectacles (usually) organized by politicians to tell a certain narrative. For example, a mayor may "cut the ribbon" at the grand re-opening of a historic hotel; the president may "pardon a turkey"; or, most commonly, a politician might issue a press release. These pseudo-events, however, are often mistaken for real news. And, more importantly, the media consumers seeing these pseudo-events often mistakenly believe these politicians are engaging "in politics".

The Image is also well-known for defining a celebrity as "a person who is known for his well-knownness." Boorstin argued that in the 1960s leaders were beginning to resemble "media stars" rather than politicians. Boorstin further warned that if the voting public continued to be inundated with pseudo-events and un-nuanced media coverage, these media stars would soon dominate the political landscape.

Of important note, the book was written shortly after the 1960 presidential election. Many commentators have noted that the contrast between John F. Kennedy's appearance and demeanor and that of Richard Nixon during their first televised presidential debate may have swung the election.

== See also ==
- Understanding Media by Marshall McLuhan, 1964 - source of the well-known phrase, "The medium is the message."
