= Amy Argetsinger =

American writer

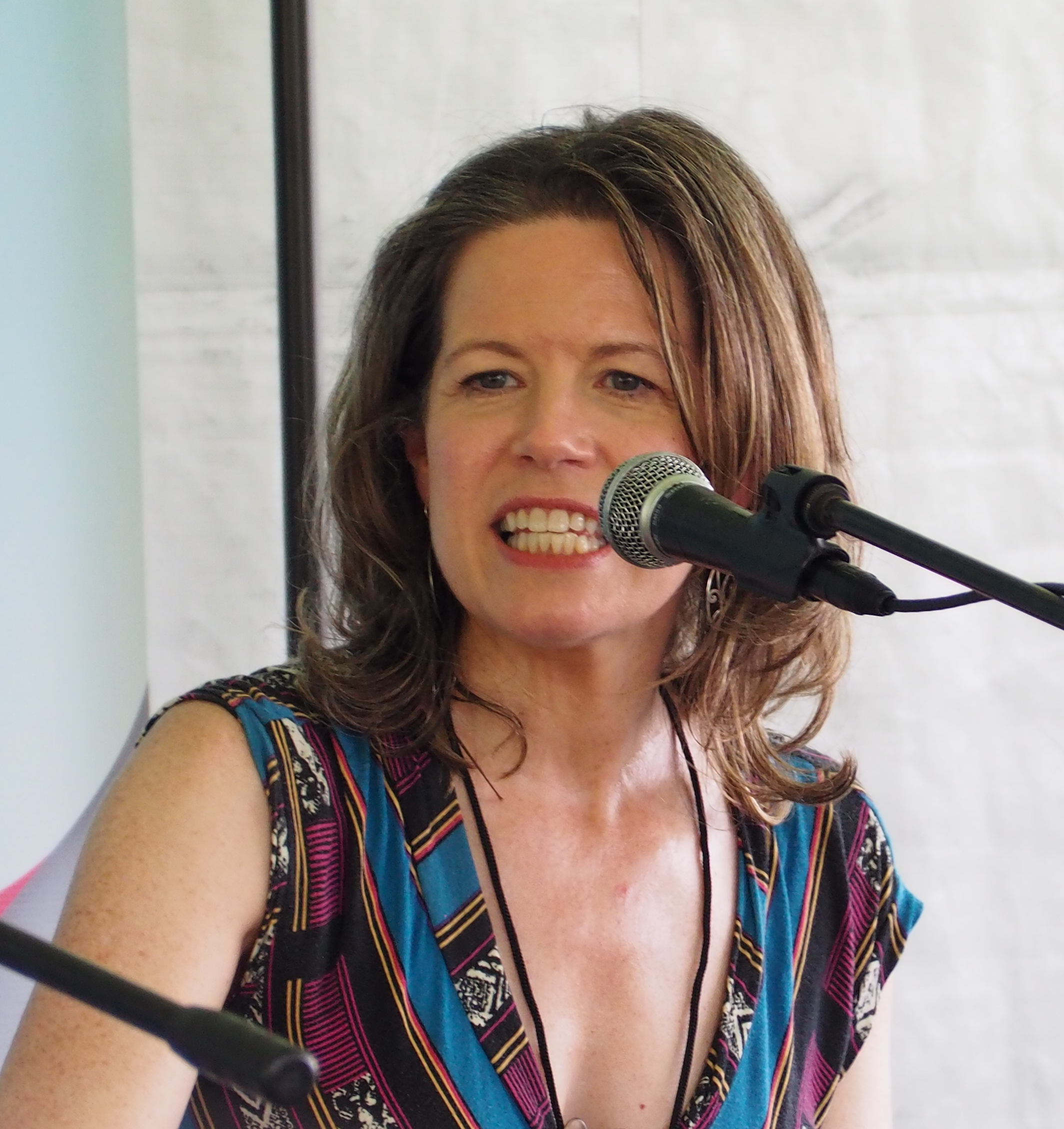
- Education: University of Virginia
- Writing career
- Genre: journalism
- Notable work: The Washington Post

Amy Argetsinger is an editor for the Style section of The Washington Post. A staff writer with The Post since 1995, she covered the Maryland suburbs, higher education and later the West Coast as an L.A.-based reporter before serving eight years as the "Reliable Source" co-columnist. She shared the column known as "The Reliable Source" with Roxanne Roberts. The two appeared regularly on Friday evening segments of MSNBC's Tucker before the show was cancelled.

== Biography ==
Argetsinger is a native of Alexandria, Virginia. She attended the St. Agnes School, graduating in 1986, after which she attended the University of Virginia, earning a degree in Political and Social Thought in 1990. Argetsinger was named an Echols Scholar, an honors program for incoming students at the University of Virginia. She edited the school's weekly paper The Declaration.

Argetsinger started her journalism career in 1991 in the Illinois/Iowa Quad Cities, at the Rock Island Argus and Moline Daily Dispatch. She joined The Washington Post in December 1995 as a Metro staff writer in the paper's Annapolis bureau, and later covered higher education. Just prior to her "Reliable Source" appointment in 2005, she covered the West Coast for the Post's National staff as Los Angeles bureau chief.

In September 2021, she published her first book, There She Was, a history of the Miss America pageant, from Simon & Schuster's One Signal Publishers.
