= Houston Endowment Inc. =

Houston Endowment Inc. was founded in 1937 by Jesse H. Jones and Mary Gibbs Jones to facilitate the expansion of their philanthropic work. The charter does not designate the Houston area as its principal beneficiary; however, the Joneses frequently chose Houston causes during their lifetimes.

The Houston Endowment supports a wide range of programs, including but not limited to the arts, education, and human services. The foundation dispersed grants of $24 million from 1937 to 1962, and grant totaling $750 million by the end of the century. In 2001, the endowment was valued at $1.5 billion.

By the mid 1950s, Houston Endowment owned many prominent buildings and businesses in Houston, Fort Worth, and New York City. In response to the Tax Reform Act of 1969, the foundation began selling its businesses and buildings and investing the proceeds in securities; the sale of the Houston Chronicle to the Hearst Corporation in 1987 completed this process.

Audrey Jones Beck, granddaughter of Jesse and Mary Gibbs Jones, joined the board of Houston Endowment in 1960 and was active in philanthropy until her death in 2003. She made significant contributions to the Museum of Fine Arts, Houston among other institutions.
