= The Americans: The Democratic Experience =

1973 history book by Daniel J. Boorstin

- Author: Daniel J. Boorstin
- Subject: History of the United States
- Publisher: Random House
- Publication date: 1973
- Publication place: United States
- Pages: 736
- Awards: Pulitzer Prize for History
- ISBN: 978-0394710112

The Americans: The Democratic Experience is a 1973 book by American historian Daniel J. Boorstin. The book is the third in his American history trilogy, in which he argues that the physical environment of the New World shaped American society.

In 1974 the book was awarded the Pulitzer Prize for History.
