= Toynbee =

- Pronunciation: /ˈtɔɪnbi/
- Language: English

Origin
- Language: Old Norse
- Origin: Tumby, Lincolnshire (old spelling: Tunnebi)
- Derivation: tún + bý
- Meaning: 'enclosure' and 'farmstead village'

Toynbee is a surname. Notable people with the surname include:

- Arnold Toynbee (1852–1883), British economic historian
- Arnold Joseph Toynbee (1889–1975), British historian
- Geoffrey Toynbee (1885–1914), English cricketer
- Henry Toynbee (1819–1909), British merchant sailor and meteorologist
- Jocelyn Toynbee (1897–1985), British archaeologist and art historian
- Joseph Toynbee (1815–1866), British physician, pioneer of otolaryngology
- Matthew Toynbee (born 1956), New Zealand cricketer
- Paget Toynbee (1855–1932), British Dante scholar
- Philip Toynbee (1916–1981), British writer
- Polly Toynbee (born 1946), British journalist and writer

== See also ==
- Toynbee Hall, a settlement in London inspired by and named in honour of Arnold Toynbee
- The Toynbee Convector, a time-travel story by Ray Bradbury, vaguely based on the philosophy of Arnold Joseph Toynbee
- Toynbee's law of challenge and response, after Arnold J. Toynbee.
- Toynbee tiles, mysterious tiles embedded in the streets of a number of US and South American cities
- The X-Men character Toad, whose 'real name' is Mortimer Toynbee
