= Daniel J. Boorstin =

American historian and 12th Librarian of Congress (1914–2004)

Daniel Boorstin
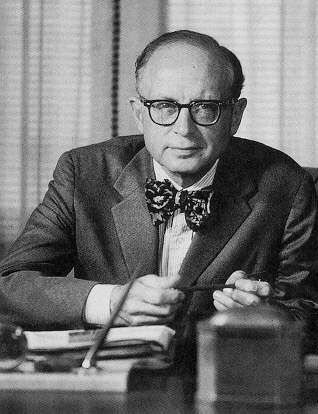

12th Librarian of Congress
- In office November 12, 1975 – September 14, 1987
- President: Gerald Ford; Jimmy Carter; Ronald Reagan
- Preceded by: John Lorenz (acting)
- Succeeded by: James Billington

Personal details
- Born: Daniel Joseph Boorstin; October 1, 1914 Atlanta, Georgia, U.S.
- Died: February 28, 2004 (aged 89) Washington, D.C., U.S.
- Spouse: Ruth Frankel (m. 1941)
- Children: 3
- Relatives: Julia Boorstin (granddaughter)
- Education: Harvard University (BA); Balliol College, Oxford (BA, BCL); Yale University (SJD)
- Awards: Pulitzer Prize for History (1974)

Daniel Joseph Boorstin (October 1, 1914 – February 28, 2004) was an American historian at the University of Chicago who wrote on many topics in American and world history. He was appointed the twelfth Librarian of the United States Congress in 1975 and served until 1987. He was instrumental in the creation of the Center for the Book at the Library of Congress.

Repudiating his youthful membership in the Communist Party, Boorstin became a political conservative and a prominent exponent of consensus history. He argued in The Genius of American Politics (1953) that ideology, propaganda, and political theory are foreign to America. His writings were often seen, along with those of historians such as Richard Hofstadter, Louis Hartz and Clinton Rossiter, as belonging to the "consensus school", which emphasized the unity of the American people and downplayed class and social conflict. Boorstin especially praised inventors and entrepreneurs as central to the American success story.

== Biography ==
Boorstin was born in 1914, in Atlanta, Georgia, into a Jewish family. His father, Samuel, was a lawyer who participated in the defense of Leo Frank, a Jewish factory superintendent who was accused and convicted of the rape and murder of a 13-year-old girl. After Frank's 1915 lynching led to a surge of anti-Semitic sentiment in Georgia, the family moved to Tulsa, Oklahoma, where Boorstin was raised. He graduated from Tulsa's Central High School in 1930, at the age of 15.

Although Samuel wanted his son to go to the University of Oklahoma, become an attorney and join his own law firm, Daniel wanted to go to Harvard Law School. He graduated with highest honors (summa cum laude) from Harvard College in 1934, then studied at Balliol College, Oxford, as a Rhodes Scholar, receiving BA and BCL degrees in 1936 and 1937. (Note: As a Rhodes Scholar, he won first class honors in jurisprudence and civil law and was admitted as a barrister-at-law of the Inner Temple.) The American National Biography Online states that he joined the Communist Party in 1938 then left it in 1939, when Russia and Germany invaded Poland. In 1940, he earned an SJD degree at Yale University.

Boorstin was hired as an assistant professor at Swarthmore College in 1942, where he stayed for two years. In 1944, he was hired by the University of Chicago, where he was a professor until 1969. He was the Pitt Professor of American History and Institutions at the University of Cambridge in 1964. He served as director and senior historian of the National Museum of History and Technology of the Smithsonian Institution (now known as the National Museum of American History, Behring Center) from 1969 to 1975. During this period, Boorstin became an active participant in the Republican Party, rubbing shoulders with high-profile politicians such as Spiro Agnew and Henry Kissinger, and speaking at the party's national platform committee at its annual convention in 1972. Boorstin served on President Nixon's Commission on the American Revolution Bicentennial in 1968–69. President Gerald Ford nominated Boorstin to be Librarian of Congress, in 1975.

On April 9, 1941, Boorstin married a Wellesley College graduate, Ruth Carolyn Frankel (1917–2013). She quickly became his partner and editor for his first book, The Mysterious Science of the Law, published in the same year. In his “Author’s Note” for The Daniel J. Boorstin Reader (Modern Library, 1995), he wrote, “Essential to my life and work as a writer was my marriage in 1941 to Ruth Frankel who has ever since been my companion and editor for all my books.” Her obituary in The Washington Post (December 6, 2013) quotes Boorstin as saying, “Without her, I think my works would have been twice as long and half as readable.”

Boorstin, with Ruth as his regular collaborator, wrote more than 20 books, including two major trilogies, one on the American experience and the other on world intellectual history. The first trilogy was entitled The Americans with three volumes: on the "colonial experience," on the "national experience," and on the "democratic experience." The books were largely celebratory of cultural, social and technological developments in American history, and featured striking story-telling about figures such as Frederic Tudor, the so-called "Ice King" of the early nineteenth century. They exemplified Boorstin's attempts to write for a general audience rather than his academic peers.The Americans: The Democratic Experience, the final book in the trilogy, received the 1974 Pulitzer Prize in history. Boorstin's second trilogy, The Discoverers, The Creators and The Seekers, examines the scientific, artistic and philosophic histories of humanity, respectively.

Within the discipline of social theory, Boorstin's 1961 book The Image: A Guide to Pseudo-events in America is an early description of aspects of American life that were later termed hyperreality and postmodernity. In The Image, Boorstin describes shifts in American culture – mainly due to advertising – where the reproduction or simulation of an event becomes more important or "real" than the event itself. He goes on to coin the term pseudo-event, which describes events or activities that serve little to no purpose other than to be reproduced through advertisements or other forms of publicity. This book also describes the type of false stories that came to be called "fake news" in the 2010s. The idea of pseudo-events anticipates later work by Jean Baudrillard and Guy Debord. The work is an often-used text in American sociology courses, and Boorstin's concerns about the social effects of technology remain influential.

Boorstin has been credited with saying, "Ideas need no passports from their place of origin, nor visas for the countries they enter.... We, the librarians of the world, are servants of an indivisible world.... Books and ideas make a boundless world."

Boorstin moved away from his earlier leftist views. In 1953, after being subpoenaed by the House Un-American Activities Committee, Boorstin became a cooperating witness and gave the committee the names of other Party members in his cell. His lectures were later boycotted by some students due to his testimony to the HUAC.

When President Ford nominated Boorstin to be Librarian of Congress in 1975, the nomination was supported by the Authors Guild but opposed by some liberals, who objected to his perceived conservatism and his opposition to the social revolution of the late 1960s and early 1970s. The American Library Association charged that Boorstin "was not a library administrator" and was therefore unqualified. The Senate confirmed the nomination without debate.

Boorstin retired in 1987, saying that he wanted to do full-time writing. He died of pneumonia February 28, 2004, in Washington D.C. He was survived by Ruth, his three sons Paul, Jonathan and David, six grandchildren, and three great-grandchildren. (Note: Cole says that his sons earn their livelihood in literary activities or in the performing arts.) David Levy, a history professor at the University of Oklahoma, said humorously in one of his lectures after Boorstin's death: "One can only imagine what he might have achieved, if he had only listened to his father’s advice about where to go to college."

=== Boorstin's approach to history ===
Professor Levy delivered a lecture about Boorstin in April 2014 at an Oklahoma University event, the President's Day of Learning. He had several observations about Boorstin's approach to American history that seem to explain why many contemporary historians opposed his appointment to head the Library of Congress. According to Levy:

- Boorstin believed that the main points of American history were made by what the people agreed upon, rather than what they fought over.
- He emphasized continuities in history, rather than radical changes.
- He distrusted doctrinaire thinking; his writings minimized the role of pure thinkers and emphasized the role of problem solvers.
- He was conservative in politics and his approach to culture, and was revolted by what he saw as vulgarities in American life and advertising.
- He observed the transformative power of seemingly mundane cultural advances as air conditioning, telephones, catalog shopping, canned food and typewriters.

== Smithsonian Institution Career ==
Boorstin became director of the Smithsonian Institution's National Museum of History and Technology (MHT) on October 1, 1969, after its founding director Frank A. Taylor assumed a pan-institutional role as Director General of Museums. Boorstin stepped down as director of MHT in 1973 to assume the position of Senior Historian, "so that he could devote more time to research and writing." He served the Smithsonian until his 1975 presidential appointment as Librarian of Congress.

As MHT director, Boorstin presided over several landmark exhibitions, including the 1970 show, “Do it the Hard Way: Rube Goldberg and Modern Times,” honoring the illustrator and artist, Rube Goldberg. Boorstin conceived of the exhibition, one of his first as MHT director. At a preview of the show, Boorstin remarked: “There have been exhibits of Einstein and Dr. Salk and Isaac Newton, but the exhibits here show us not only how to enrich and deepen man, but how to amuse him. This show is about the ways we've discovered to give ourselves a headache. It tells us where technology leads us and misleads us, and touches the life of every American. Rube Goldberg foresaw the road to the electric toothbrush.”

One of Boorstin's most influential public programs at MHT were the Frank Nelson Doubleday Lectures, which began in 1972 focusing on 'technology and the frontiers of knowledge' and featured speakers such as writers Saul Bellow, Isaac Asimov, and Arthur C. Clarke, and technologists like Sony's founder Akio Morita.

Completed during his Smithsonian tenure and published in June 1973, The Americans: The Democratic Experience was awarded the Pulitzer Prize in early 1974. Boorstin was the first Smithsonian employee to receive the award.

== Impact on the Library of Congress ==
External videos
- Tribute to Daniel J. Boorstin at the Library of Congress, December 4, 2000, C-SPAN

John Y. Cole, in the obituary of Boorstin he wrote for the American Antiquarian, credited Boorstin with bringing new intellectual energy to the Library of Congress (LOC), opening the institution to, "the public, to scholars, and to new constituencies.

In 1976, Boorstin held a press conference to announce that he had discovered the contents of President Lincoln's pockets when he was assassinated in 1865. They had been in a wall safe in the Librarian's office. Boorstin had these artifacts put on public display, where they have become the most popular attraction for tourists visiting the American Treasures of the Library of Congress exhibition in the Library's Jefferson Building. He was instrumental in creating the American Folklife Center in 1976, and the Center for the Book in the Library of Congress in 1977. (Note: The Center for the Book is an office in the LOC to promote the reading of books both nationally and internationally. It has affiliate centers in all 50 states, DC, and the US Virgin Islands.)

In 1979, the LOC and the Kennedy Center opened a Performing Arts Library in the Kennedy Center. In 1980, Boorstin set up the Council of Scholars, a new link between the LOC and the world of scholarship. Another major event during Boorstin's tenure at the LOC was the construction and implementation of LOC's James Madison Memorial Building during 1980-1982. He obtained private contributions to open the Mary Pickford Theater in the Madison Building in 1983. The theater was intended to increase public awareness of the LOC's large collection of motion pictures.

In 1984, Boorstin and Architect of the Capitol George White teamed up to persuade Congress to appropriate $81.5 million for rehabilitating two of the LOC's older structures, the Jefferson (1897) and Adams (1939) Buildings. In 1986, Boorstin appeared before Congress to oppose legislation that would have made drastic cuts in the LOC budget. His pleas resulted in substantially restoring the proposed cuts. It also resulted in his being called, "an intellectual Paul Revere."

Overall, Boorstin proved so persuasive that the Federal appropriation increased from $116 million to more than $250 million during his administration.

== Honors ==
His book The Americans: The Colonial Experience (1958) won the 1959 Bancroft Prize. The Society of American Historians awarded Boorstin the 1966 Francis Parkman Prize for The Americans: The National Experience. Boorstin was awarded the Order of the Sacred Treasure, First Class, by the Japanese government in 1986. He received the Golden Plate Award of the American Academy of Achievement in 1986. He was awarded a Pulitzer Prize for writing The Americans: The Democratic Experience (1973).

He was a member of both the American Academy of Arts and Sciences and the American Philosophical Society.

He was inducted into the Tulsa Hall of Fame in 1989, and received the Oklahoma Book Award in 1993 for The Creators. He was posthumously inducted into the Georgia Writers Hall of Fame in 2023.

He held twenty honorary degrees, including an honorary Doctor of Laws from the University of Tulsa and Doctor of Letters from Oglethorpe University in 1994.

== Books ==
- The Mysterious Science of the Law: An Essay on Blackstone's Commentaries (1941)
- The Lost World of Thomas Jefferson (1948)
- The Genius of American Politics (University of Chicago Press, 1953) ISBN 0226064913
- The Americans: The Colonial Experience (1958)
- America and the Image of Europe: Reflections on American Thought (1960)
- A Lady's Life In The Rocky Mountains: Introduction (1960)
- The Image: A Guide to Pseudo-events in America (1962)
- The Americans: The National Experience (1965)
- The Landmark History of the American People: From Plymouth to Appomattox (1968)
- The Decline of Radicalism: Reflections of America Today (1969)
- The Landmark History of the American People: From Appomattox to the Moon (1970)
- The Sociology of the Absurd: Or, the Application of Professor X (1970)
- The Americans: The Democratic Experience (1973)
- Democracy and Its Discontents: Reflections on Everyday America (1974)
- The Exploring Spirit: America and the World, Then and Now (1976)
- The Republic of Technology (1978)
- A History of the United States with Brooks M. Kelley and Ruth Frankel (1981)
- The Discoverers: A History of Man's Search to Know His World and Himself (1983)
- Hidden History (1987)
- The Creators: A History of Heroes of the Imagination (1992)
- Cleopatra's Nose: Essays on the Unexpected (1994)
- The Seekers: The Story of Man's Continuing Quest to Understand His World (1998)

== Notes ==
Government offices
Preceded by John Lorenz; Acting	Librarian of Congress; 1975–1987	Succeeded by James H. Billington
