= Composition with Grid No. 1 =

Painting by Piet Mondrian

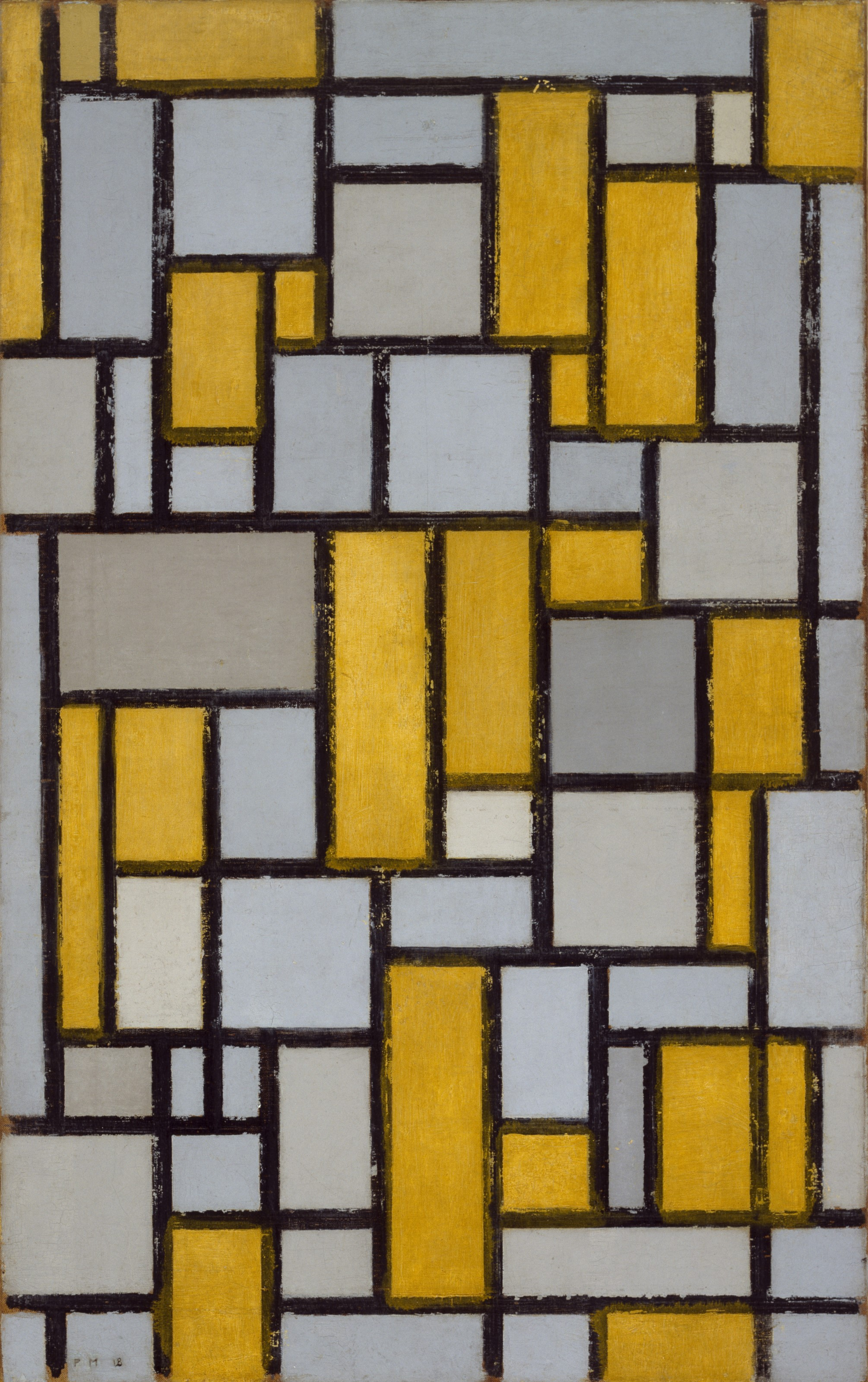
- Artist: Piet Mondrian
- Year: 1918
- Medium: oil on canvas
- Dimensions: 80.2 cm × 49.8 cm (31.6 in × 19.6 in)
- Location: Museum of Fine Arts, Houston (MFAH), Houston

Composition with Grid No. 1 or Composition in Grey and Ochre is a 1918 painting by the Dutch artist Piet Mondrian. It is currently in the collection of the Museum of Fine Arts, Houston.

== Background ==
In 1917, Mondrian was one of the founding members of the Dutch art group De Stijl ("The Style"), an abstract movement which sought unification of material and spiritual worlds through pure geometry. Composition with Grid No. 1, painted in 1918, was an early painting to adopt this style. The Dutch art historian Carel Blotkamp hypothesizes that this painting is one of Mondrian's first to use a modular or grid-like system. Later X-ray photography corroborates this, revealing that Mondrian sketched an underlying grid pattern of uniform rectangles based on the golden ratio. Mondrian continued to use grid patterns in his work, even in his final compositions Broadway Boogie Woogie and Victory Boogie Woogie.

== Description ==
Mondrian drew the underlying modular system onto the canvas in charcoal. He then used dark grey oil paints to delineate rectangular areas of varying sizes on this grid. Thus, the painting's visible rectangles are superimposed on the underlying grid, giving what the Museum of Fine Arts, Houston, describes as "an exceptional harmony of proportion". These rectangles were then painted in gray and ochre colors.

Mondrian signed and dated the painting in the lower left with the inscription "PM 18".

== Exhibition and provenance ==
The painting was on display in an exhibition organized by the Hollandsche Kunstenaarskring ("Dutch Artists' Circle") in the Stedelijk Museum in Amsterdam in 1919. In 1960, the painting was purchased by Mr. and Mrs. Pierre Schlumberger before being donated to the Museum of Fine Arts, Houston, in 1963, where it is currently housed.

== In research ==
A paper by Li et al., published in 2013, sought to model human aesthetic judgement. One of the paintings selected for the experiments was Mondrian's Composition with Grid No. 1, alongside the artist's Composition No. 10 (1939–1942) and Composition with Yellow, Blue, and Red (1937–1942).

== Sources ==
- Blotkamp, Carel (2001) [1994]. Mondrian: The Art of Destruction. Translated by Fasting, Barbara Potter. London: Reaktion Books. ISBN 1861891008. LCCN 94012689.
- Li, Yang; Hu, Changjun; Minku, Leandro L.; Zuo, Haolei (2013). "Learning aesthetic judgements in evolutionary art systems". Genetic Programming and Evolvable Machines. 14 (3). Springer Publishing: 315–337. doi:10.1007/s10710-013-9188-7. ISSN 1389-2576. S2CID 16007849.
- Millard, Charles W. (1972). "Mondrian". The Hudson Review. 25 (2). The Hudson Review, Inc: 270–274. doi:10.2307/3849001. JSTOR 3849001.
- "Composition with Grid #1". Google Arts & Culture.
- "Composition with Grid #1". Museum of Fine Arts, Houston.
