= The Red Tree =

The Red Tree may refer to:

- The Red Tree (picture book), a children's book by Shaun Tan
- The Red Tree, a novel by Caitlín R. Kiernan
- The Red Tree (album), an album by Moneen
- Evening; Red Tree, a painting by Piet Mondrian
