= Gray Tree =

1911 painting by Piet Mondrian

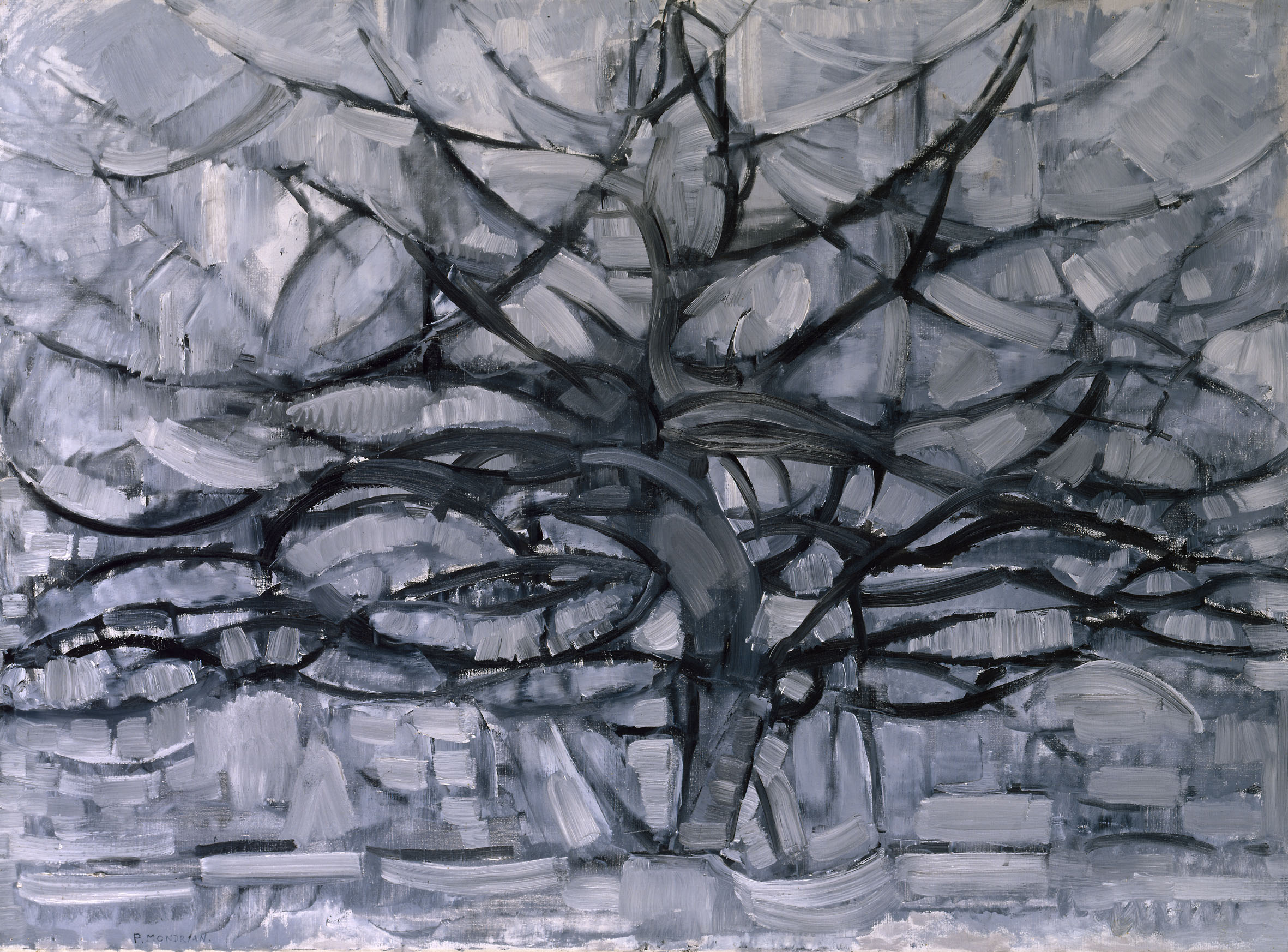
- Artist: Piet Mondrian
- Year: 1911
- Medium: Oil on canvas
- Dimensions: 78.50 cm × 107.5 cm (30.9 in × 42.3 in)
- Location: Kunstmuseum Den Haag, The Hague

Gray Tree is a 1911 oil painting by Piet Mondrian. The work was painted on canvas on a board measuring 78.5 × 107.5 cm (8,440 square centimetres, 1,308 sq in). It is exhibited at Kunstmuseum Den Haag in The Hague, the Netherlands.

The work was created at a time when Mondrian was beginning to experiment with Cubism: its foreground and background elements seem to intermingle, and the palette is very restricted. The tree is subtly oval in form, following another Cubist practice seen in works by Pablo Picasso and Georges Braque. Mondrian's oval became explicit, framing the work, in paintings that followed over the next three or four years. Apple Tree in Flower, also from 1912, is a similarly sized composition. Though the outline of the "apple tree" recalls that of Gray Tree, the work is significantly more faceted and abstract.

== Sources ==
- Milner, John (1992). Mondrian. First American Edition. Phaidon Press. Pages 98–99. ISBN 1-55859-400-0
