= Composition 10 in Black and White =

Oil painting by Piet Mondrian (1915)

- Compositie 10 in zwart wit (Dutch)
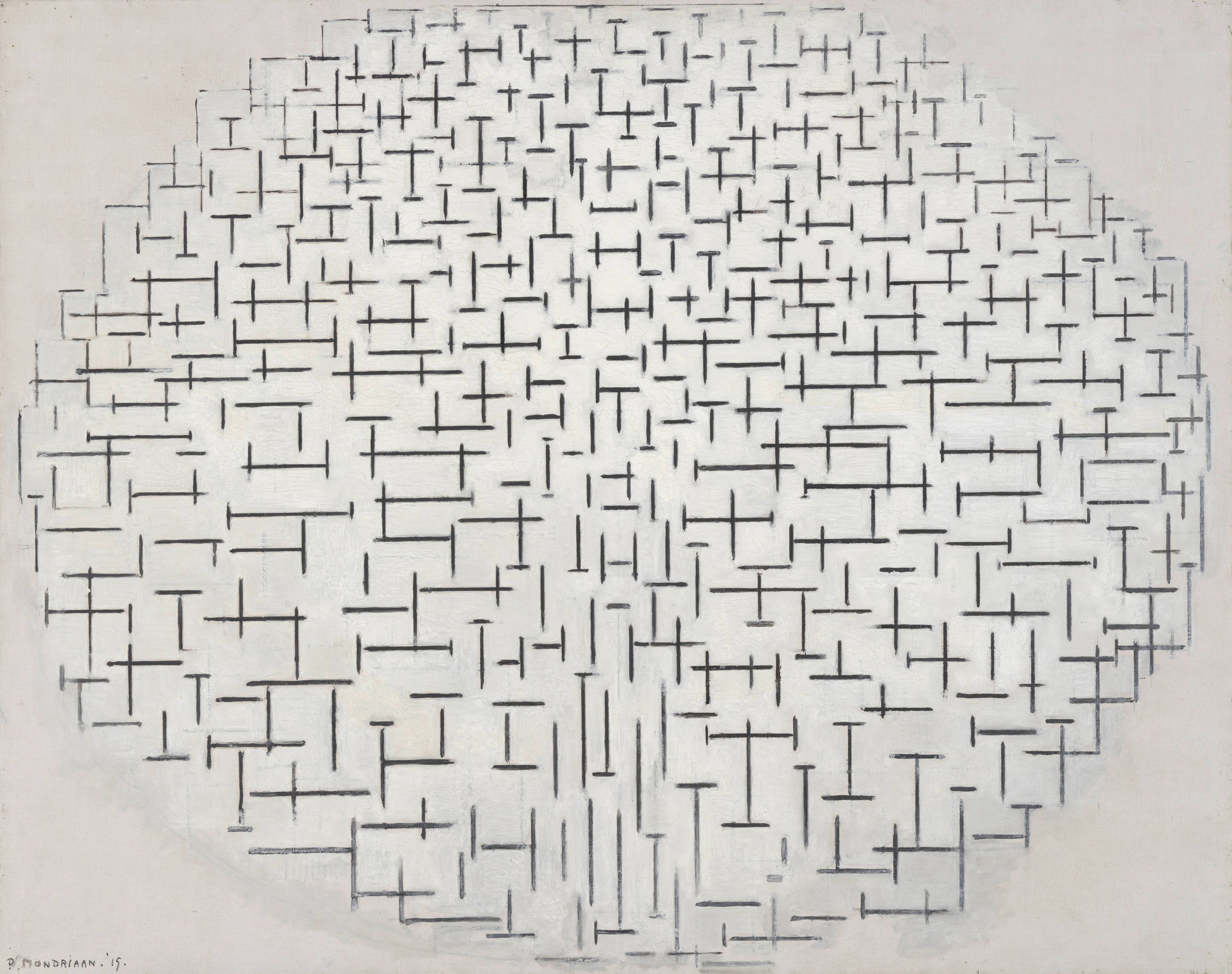
- Artist: Piet Mondrian
- Year: 1915
- Medium: Oil on canvas
- Movement: Cubism, De Stijl
- Dimensions: 85 cm × 108 cm (33 in × 43 in)
- Location: Kröller-Müller Museum, Otterlo

Composition 10 in Black and White (Dutch: Compositie 10 in zwart wit) is a 1915 oil painting by Dutch artist Piet Mondrian. It is sometimes called Pier and Ocean, given its preceding works with similar titles. It is an abstract composition consisting of horizontal and vertical black lines on white. It belongs vaguely to the Cubist and De Stijl movements, having been created before their official conception but carrying similar influence.

After the outbreak of World War I, Mondrian was kept from travelling. For a while, he lived in the seaside resorts of Domburg and Scheveningen. There he created a series of drawings inspired by the sea. In 1915, based on those drawings, he created this painting. It is the first in which he uses exclusively black and white.

This painting is considered a turning point in his journey toward abstraction. Although it has influence from the breakwater (the pier is the vertical lines, while the waves are horizontal), it is generally abstract. After this painting, Mondrian moved away from recognizable representations of nature and toward visual harmony. This shift is visible in the focus on rhythm and pure line in Composition 10.

This work is currently in the Kröller-Müller Museum in Otterlo, Netherlands.

== Influence ==
Inspired by this painting, FALT wrote the song Offshore for the music competition Art Rocks.
