= Victory Boogie Woogie =

Last painting by Piet Mondrian

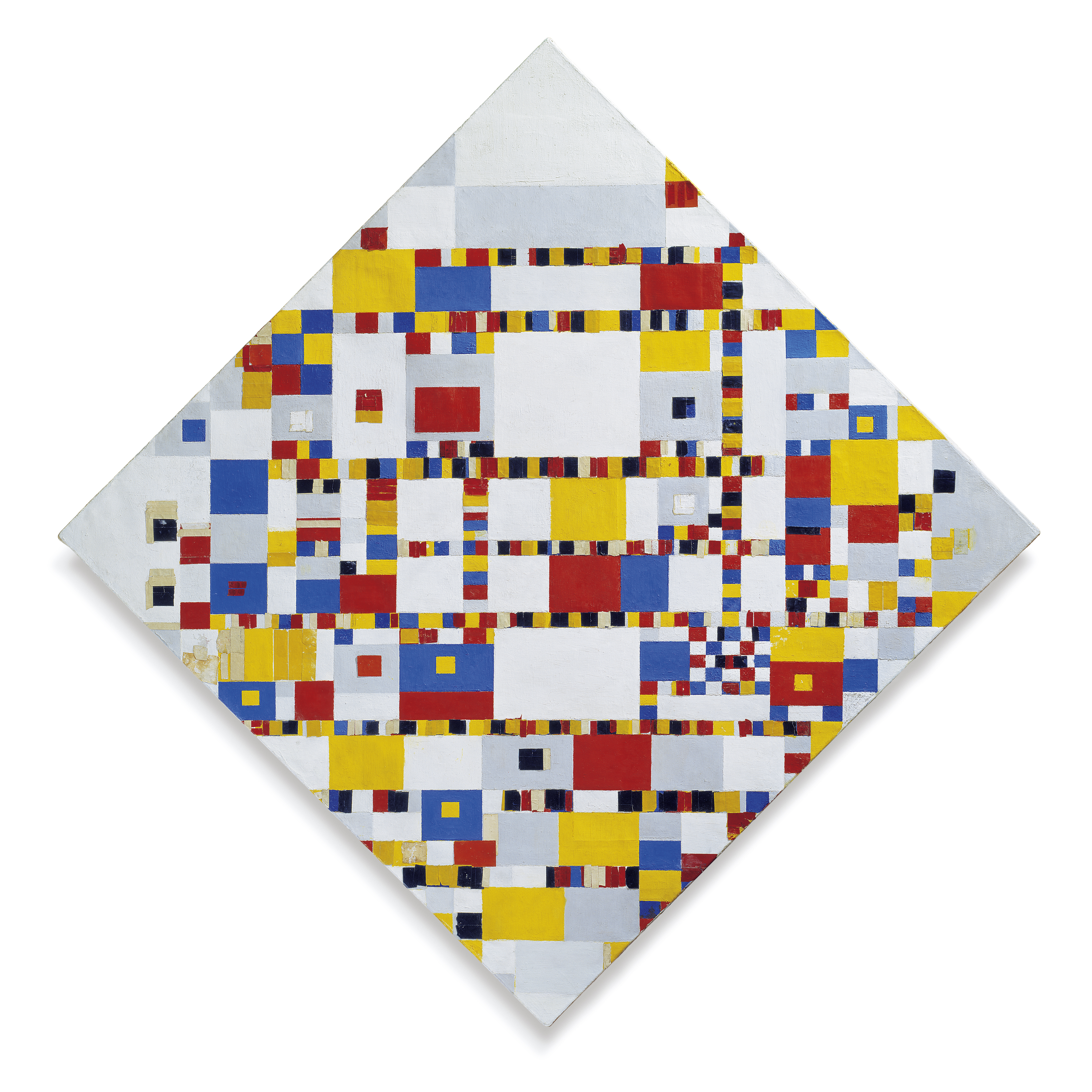
- Artist: Piet Mondrian
- Year: 1942–1944
- Type: Oil and paper on canvas
- Dimensions: 127 cm × 127 cm (50 in × 50 in)
- Location: Kunstmuseum, The Hague
- Owner: State property of the Netherlands through the Stichting Nationaal Fonds Kunstbezit

Victory Boogie Woogie is the last, unfinished work of the Dutch abstract painter Piet Mondrian, left incomplete when Mondrian died in New York in 1944. He was still working on it three days before dying. Since 1998 it has been in the collection of the Kunstmuseum, in The Hague. It has been said that "Mondrian's life and his affection for music are mirrored in the painting [and that it is] a testimony of the influence which New York had on Mondrian."

== Purchase for the Kunstmuseum, The Hague ==
It was purchased at a cost of 80 million Dutch guilders (approximately 35 million euros, US$40 million) from the American collector Samuel Irving Newhouse, who previously had bought it from Emily and Burton Tremaine for US$12 million in the mid 1980s. It was bought in 1997 by the Stichting Nationaal Fonds Kunstbezit (National Art Foundation) through a gift from the Dutch Central Bank, commemorating the introduction of the euro, at the time the most expensive purchase ever for a Dutch museum. The amount of money raised questions in the Dutch House of Representatives, and also from other museums.

In 2014, U.S. President Barack Obama was photographed with Victory Boogie Woogie, in the company of some Dutch politicians.
