= Carel Blotkamp =

Dutch artist and art historian

Carel Hendrik Blotkamp (born 1945) is a Dutch artist, art historian, writer and critic. He was a professor at the Vrije Universiteit Amsterdam between 1982 and 2007. Apart from his academic career Blotkamp is known for his work in art critique, writing for several newspapers and magazines. He also co-founded several art magazines. Blotkamp is considered an authority on De Stijl and magic realism, and wrote several books on modern artists.

== Career ==
Blotkamp was born in Zeist in 1945. At an early age he started going to museums on his own. While in high school he started attended painting classes at the Artibus. At the end of his high school period he was doubting on what to study, and was eventually persuaded by Utrecht University lecturer of art history, Pieter Singelenberg, to study art history at Utrecht University. In the 1960s he was one of the few in the Netherlands to study modern art. During his final years of study he became a part-time lecturer at the Rotterdam Academy of Visual Arts. In 1968, he obtained his degree. The next year he started as scientific employee at the university. He later became a lecturer of modern art history at Utrecht University. Blotkamp obtained his PhD at Utrecht University in 1973 under Jan Gerrit van Gelder with a thesis titled: "Pyke Koch; een studie van zijn schilderijen, met oeuvrecatalogus".

Blotkamp became a part-time professor of modern art history at the Vrije Universiteit Amsterdam in 1982. He took up emeritus status in May 2007. In this position he became known as a proponent of an emancipatory position of modern art. Due to his part-time position Blotkamp was able to continue his work in art and writing. He worked as art-critique writer for Vrij Nederland between 1967 and 1975, producing articles almost every two weeks. Blotkamp also wrote critiques for the newspapers NRC Handelsblad and de Volkskrant. In 1975 he won the Pierre Bayleprijs for his efforts. Blotkamp is considered an authority on De Stijl and magic realism. He also wrote books on Ad Dekker, Pyke Koch, Piet Mondriaan, Carel Visser and Daan van Golden. Blotkamp was co-founder and editor of several art magazines.

Blotkamp started working as an artist in 1967. He frequently uses text as the basis of his works. Blotkamp also incorporates the history of modern art. In his more recent work Blotkamp regularly uses sequins.

Blotkamp was elected a member of the Royal Netherlands Academy of Arts and Sciences in 2002.

== Personal life ==
Blotkamp married Hoos Blotkamp-de Roos in 1967. Amongst other positions she served as director of the Dutch Film Museum. She died in 2014.
