= Piet Mondrian =

Dutch painter (1872–1944)

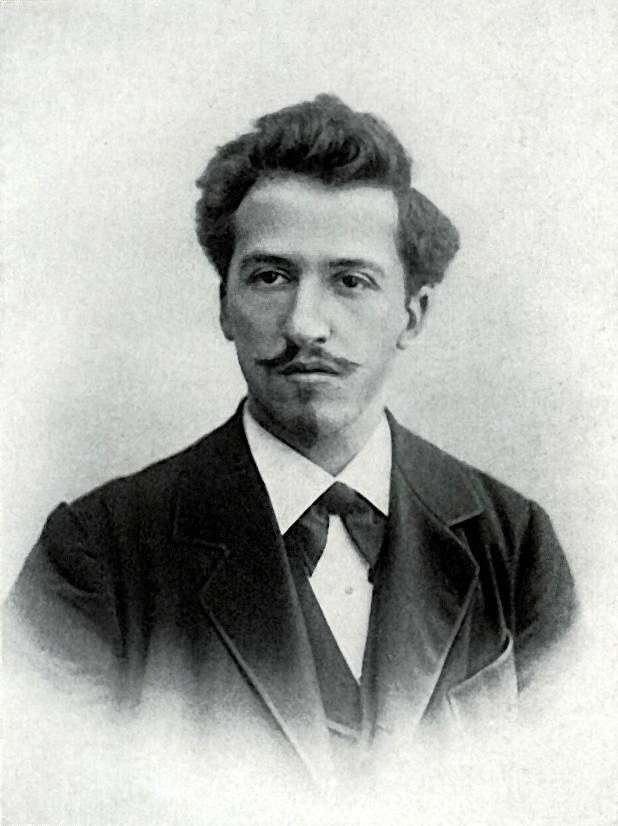
- Mondrian in 1899
- Born: Pieter Cornelis Mondriaan; 7 March 1872; Amersfoort, Netherlands
- Died: 1 February 1944 (aged 71); New York City, U.S.
- Education: Rijksakademie (Academy of Fine Arts), Amsterdam
- Known for: Painting
- Notable work: Evening; Red Tree, Gray Tree, Composition with Red Blue and Yellow, Broadway Boogie Woogie, Victory Boogie Woogie
- Movement: De Stijl, abstract art

Pieter Cornelis Mondriaan (Dutch: [ˈpitər kɔrˈneːlɪs ˈmɔndrijaːn]; 7 March 1872 – 1 February 1944), known after 1911 as Piet Mondrian (/piːt ˈmɒndriɑːn/, US also /- ˈmɔːn-/; Dutch: [pit ˈmɔndrijɑn]), was a Dutch painter and art theoretician, who is regarded as one of the greatest artists of the 20th century. He was one of the pioneers of 20th-century abstract art, as he changed his artistic direction from figurative painting to an increasingly abstract style, until he reached a point where his artistic vocabulary was taken down to simple geometric elements.

Mondrian's art was highly utopian, and was concerned with a search for universal values and aesthetics. He proclaimed in 1914, "Art is higher than reality and has no direct relation to reality. To approach the spiritual in art, one will make as little use as possible of reality, because reality is opposed to the spiritual. We find ourselves in the presence of an abstract art. Art should be above reality, otherwise it would have no value for man."

He was a contributor to the De Stijl art movement and group, which he co-founded with Theo van Doesburg. He evolved a non-representational form which he termed Neoplasticism. This was the new 'pure plastic art' which he believed was necessary in order to create 'universal beauty'. To express this, Mondrian eventually decided to limit his formal vocabulary to the three primary colors (red, blue, and yellow), the three primary values (black, white, and gray), and the two primary directions (horizontal and vertical). Mondrian's arrival in Paris from the Netherlands in 1912 marked the beginning of a period of profound change. He encountered experiments in Cubism, and with the intent of integrating himself within the Parisian avant-garde removed an 'a' from the Dutch spelling of his name (Mondriaan).

== Life ==
=== Netherlands (1872–1911) ===
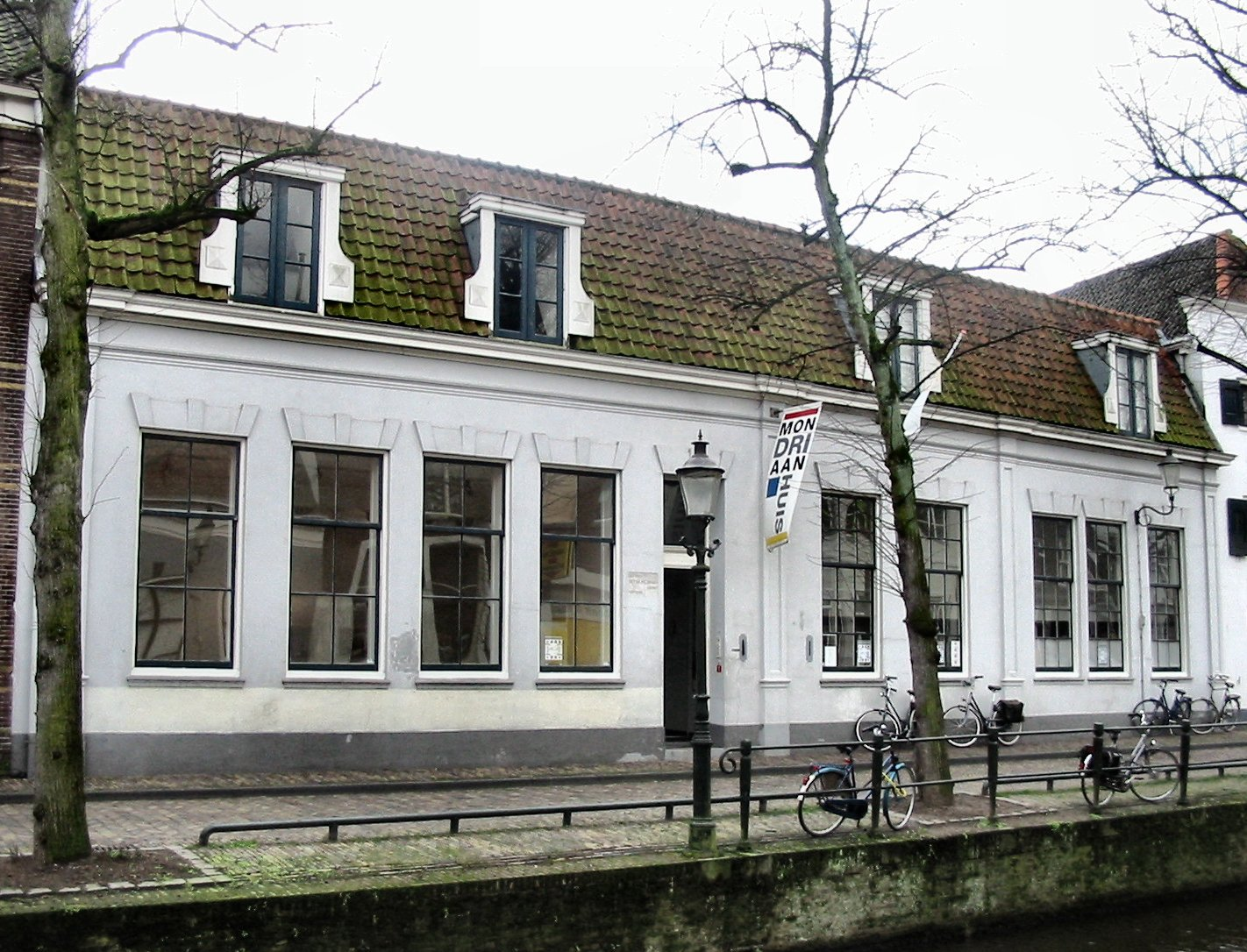
Mondrian's birthplace in Amersfoort, Netherlands, now The Mondriaan House, a museum.

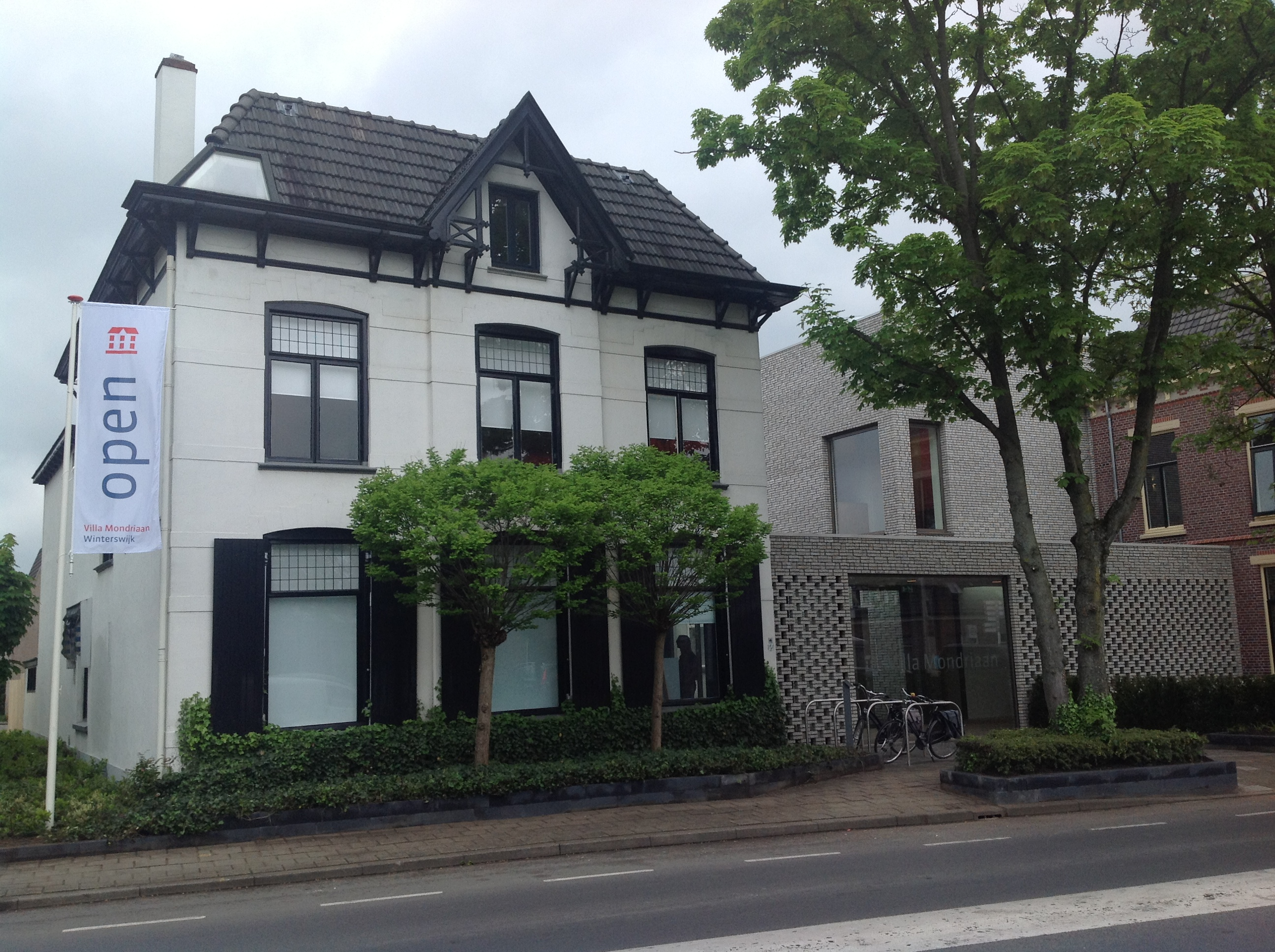
Piet Mondrian lived in this house, now the Villa Mondriaan, in Winterswijk, from 1880 to 1892.

Mondrian was born in Amersfoort, province of Utrecht in the Netherlands, the second of his parents' children. He was descended from Christian Dirkzoon Monderyan, who lived in The Hague as early as 1670. The family moved to Winterswijk when his father, Pieter Cornelius Mondriaan, was appointed head teacher at a local primary school. Mondrian was introduced to art from an early age. His father was a qualified drawing teacher, and, with his uncle, Frits Mondriaan (a pupil of Willem Maris of the Hague School of artists), the younger Piet often painted and drew along the river Gein.

After a strict Protestant upbringing, in 1892, Mondrian entered the Academy for Fine Art in Amsterdam. He was already qualified as a teacher. He began his career as a teacher in primary education, but he also practiced painting. Most of his work from this period is naturalistic or Impressionistic, consisting largely of landscapes. These pastoral images of his native country depict windmills, fields, and rivers, initially in the Dutch Impressionist manner of the Hague School and then in a variety of styles and techniques that attest to his search for a personal style. These paintings are representational, and they illustrate the influence that various artistic movements had on Mondrian, including pointillism and the vivid colors of Fauvism. In 1893 he had his first exhibition.

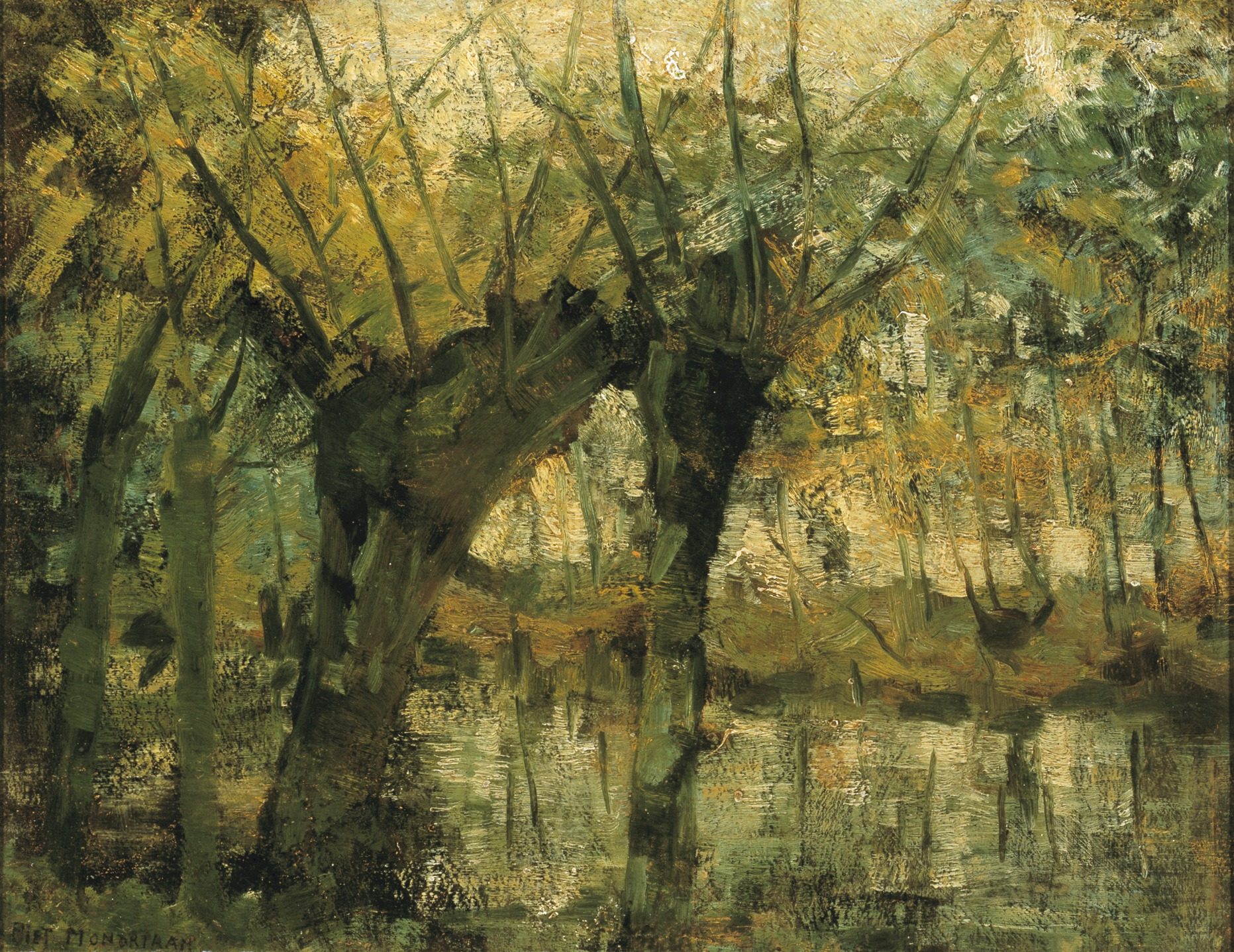
Willow Grove: Impression of Light and Shadow, c. 1905, oil on canvas, 35 × 45 cm, Dallas Museum of Art

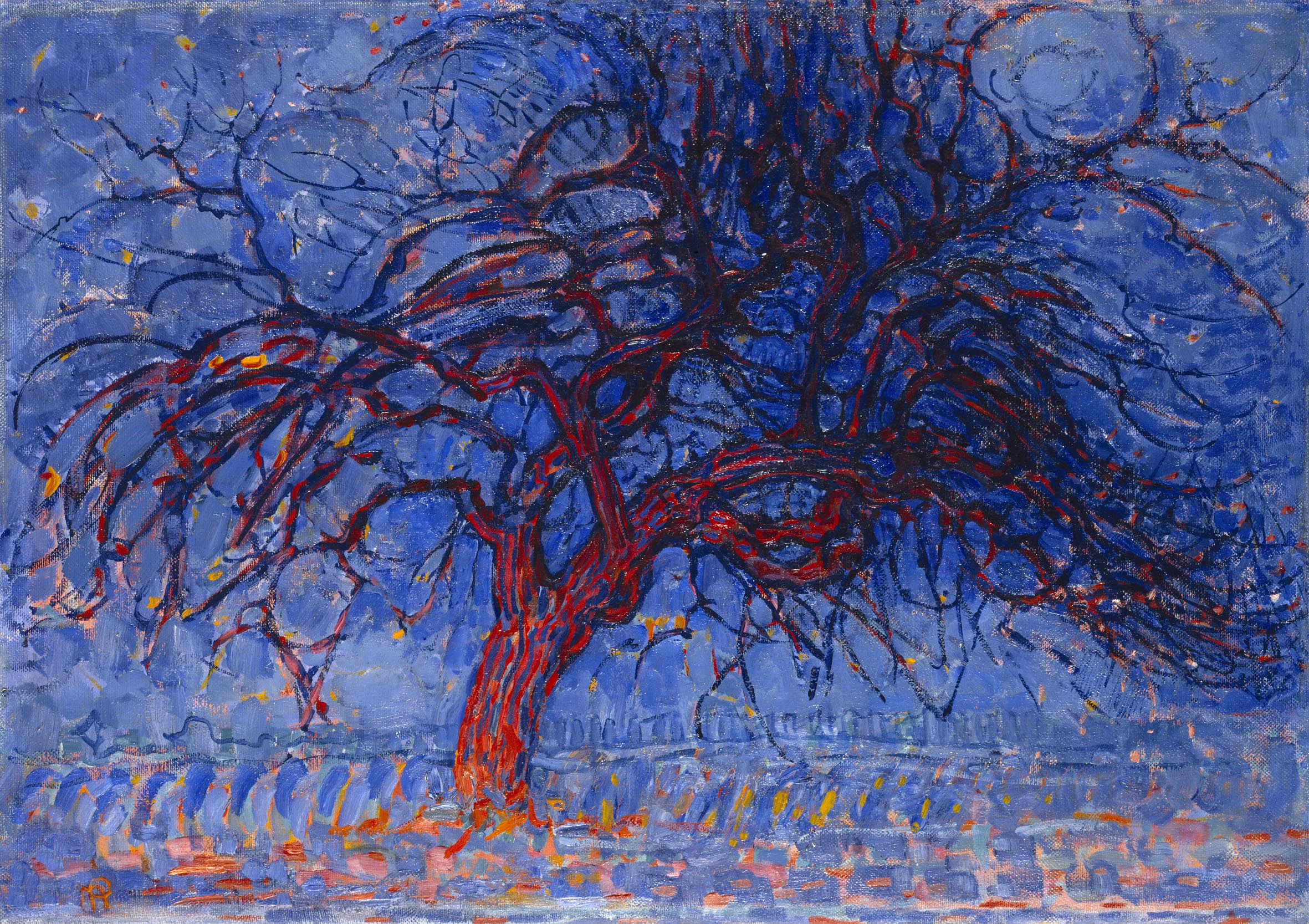
Piet Mondrian, Evening; Red Tree (Avond; De rode boom), 1908–1910, oil on canvas, 70 × 99 cm, Gemeentemuseum Den Haag

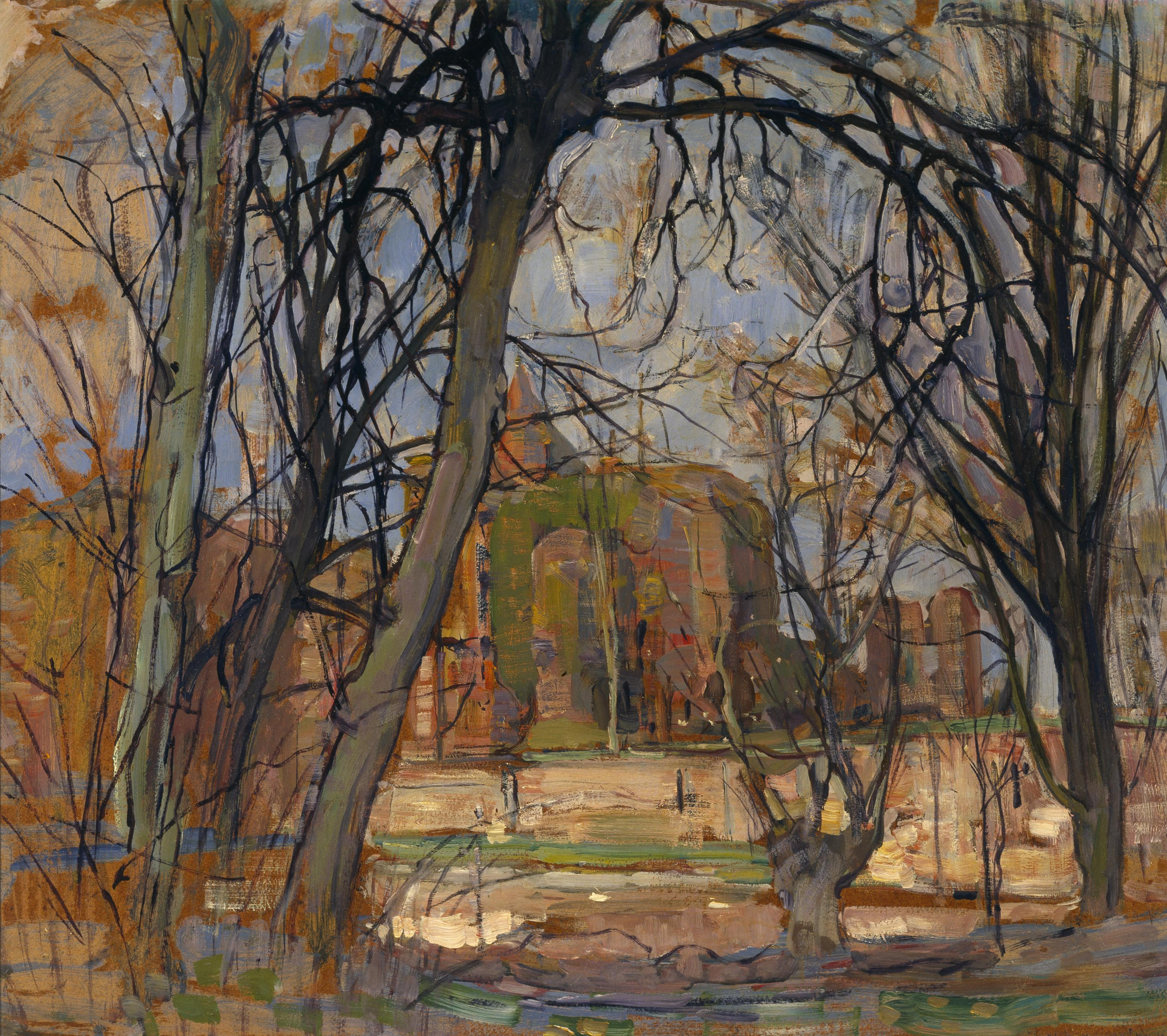
Spring Sun (Lentezon): Castle Ruin: Brederode, c. late 1909 – early 1910, oil on masonite, 62 × 72 cm, Dallas Museum of Art

On display in the Kunstmuseum Den Haag are a number of paintings from this period, including such Post-Impressionist works as The Red Mill and Trees in Moonrise. Another painting, Evening (Avond) (1908), depicting a tree in a field at dusk, even augurs future developments by using a palette consisting almost entirely of red, yellow, and blue. Although Avond is only limitedly abstract, it is the earliest Mondrian painting to emphasize primary colors.

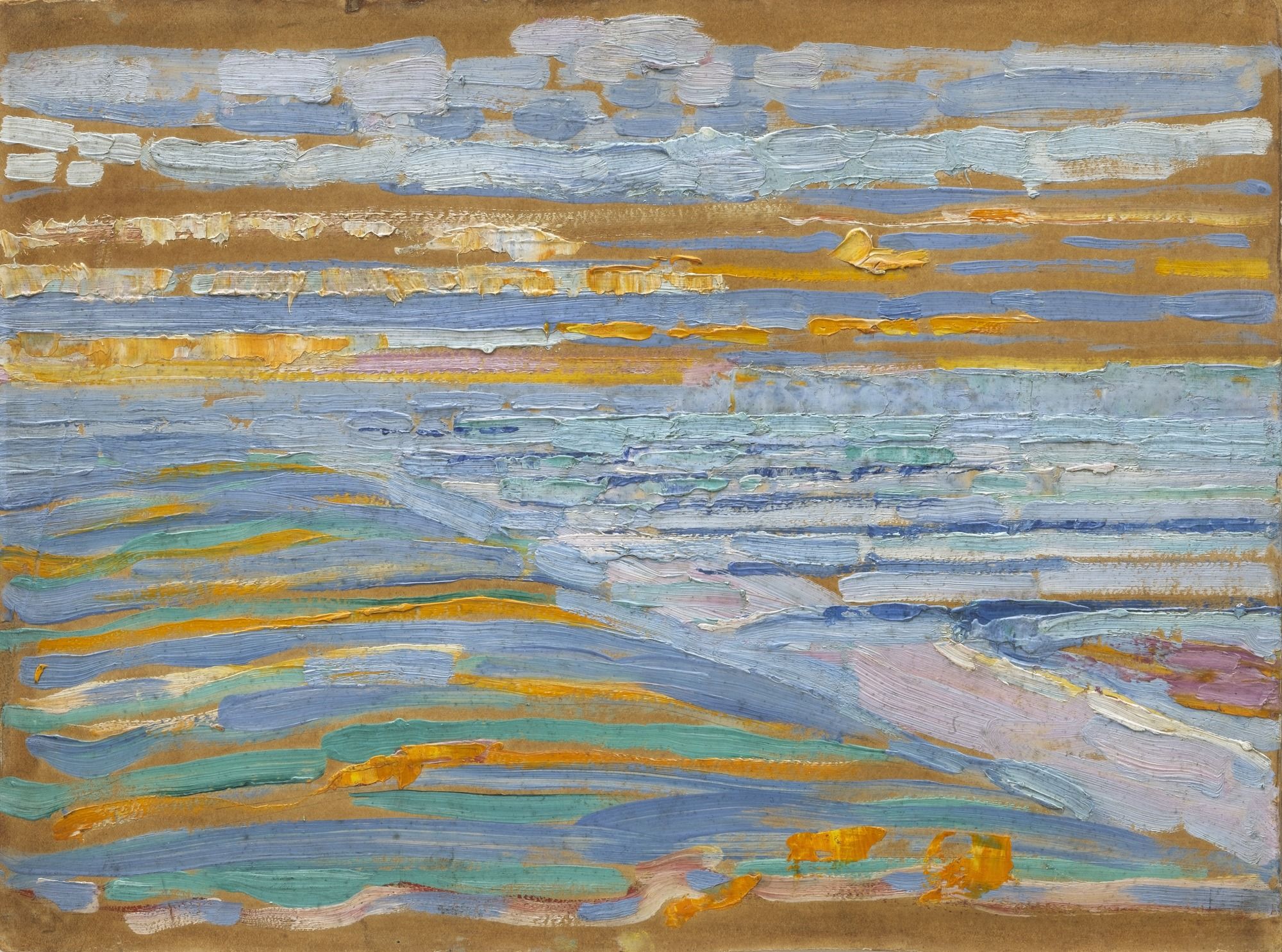
Piet Mondrian, View from the Dunes with Beach and Piers, Domburg, 1909, oil and pencil on cardboard, Museum of Modern Art, New York

Mondrian's earliest paintings showing a degree of abstraction are a series of canvases from 1905 to 1908 that depict dim scenes of indistinct trees and houses reflected in still water. Although the result leads the viewer to begin focusing on the forms over the content, these paintings are still firmly rooted in nature, and it is only the knowledge of Mondrian's later achievements that leads one to search in these works for the roots of his future abstraction.

Mondrian's art was intimately related to his spiritual and philosophical studies. In 1908, he became interested in the theosophical movement launched by Helena Petrovna Blavatsky in the late 19th century, and in 1909 he joined the Dutch branch of the Theosophical Society. The work of Blavatsky and a parallel spiritual movement, Rudolf Steiner's Anthroposophy, significantly affected the further development of his aesthetic. Blavatsky believed that it was possible to attain a more profound knowledge of nature than that provided by empirical means, and much of Mondrian's work for the rest of his life was inspired by his search for that spiritual knowledge. In 1918, he wrote "I got everything from the Secret Doctrine", referring to a book written by Blavatsky. In 1921, in a letter to Steiner, Mondrian argued that his neoplasticism was "the art of the foreseeable future for all true Anthroposophists and Theosophists". He remained a committed Theosophist in subsequent years, although he also believed that his own artistic current, neoplasticism, would eventually become part of a larger, ecumenical spirituality.

Mondrian and his later work were deeply influenced by the 1911 Moderne Kunstkring exhibition of Cubism in Amsterdam. His search for simplification is shown in two versions of Still Life with Ginger Pot (Stilleven met Gemberpot). The 1911 version is Cubist; in the 1912 version, the objects are reduced to a round shape with triangles and rectangles.

=== Paris (1912–1914) ===
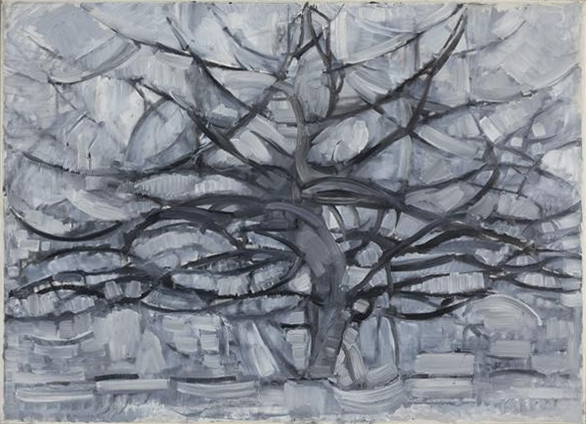
Gray Tree, 1911, Kunstmuseum Den Haag, an early experimentation with Cubism

In 1912, Mondrian moved to Paris and changed his name, dropping an "a" from "Mondriaan", to emphasize his departure from the Netherlands, and his integration within the Parisian avant-garde. While in Paris, the influence of the Cubist style of Pablo Picasso and Georges Braque appeared almost immediately in Mondrian's work. Paintings such as The Sea (1912) and his various studies of trees from that year still contain a measure of representation, but, increasingly, they are dominated by geometric shapes and interlocking planes. While Mondrian was eager to absorb the Cubist influence into his work, it seems clear that he saw Cubism as a "port of call" on his artistic journey, rather than as a destination. Piet Mondrian's Cubist period lasted from 1912 to 1917.

=== Netherlands (1914–1918) ===
Unlike the Cubists, Mondrian still attempted to reconcile his painting with his spiritual pursuits, and in 1913 he began to fuse his art and his theosophical studies into a theory that signaled his final break from representational painting. While Mondrian was visiting the Netherlands in 1914, World War I began, forcing him to remain there for the duration of the conflict. Isolated, he began to create his own visual language, creating works like Compositie 10 in zwart wit (1915). During this period, he stayed at the Laren artists' colony, where he met Bart van der Leck and Theo van Doesburg, who were both undergoing their own personal journeys toward abstraction. Van der Leck's use of only primary colors in his art greatly influenced Mondrian. After a meeting with Van der Leck in 1916, Mondrian wrote, "My technique which was more or less Cubist, and therefore more or less pictorial, came under the influence of his precise method." With Van Doesburg, Mondrian founded De Stijl (The Style), a journal of the De Stijl Group, in which he first published essays defining his theory, which he called neoplasticism.

Mondrian published "De Nieuwe Beelding in de schilderkunst" ("The New Visualisation in Painting"), in twelve installments during 1917 and 1918. This was his first major attempt to express his artistic theory in writing. Mondrian's best and most-often quoted expression of this theory, however, comes from a letter he wrote to H. P. Bremmer in 1914:

I construct lines and color combinations on a flat surface, in order to express general beauty with the utmost awareness. Nature (or, that which I see) inspires me, puts me, as with any painter, in an emotional state so that an urge comes about to make something, but I want to come as close as possible to the truth and abstract everything from that, until I reach the foundation (still just an external foundation!) of things... I believe it is possible that, through horizontal and vertical lines constructed with awareness, but not with calculation, led by high intuition, and brought to harmony and rhythm, these basic forms of beauty, supplemented if necessary by other direct lines or curves, can become a work of art, as strong as it is true.

In 1920 Mondrian's text was translated into French and published as Le Néoplasticisme. A Polish translation of the book was also planned: in his correspondence with various artists from late 1926 and early 1927 Mondrian mentioned several times that he had been busy working on the layout of the Polish translation which he prepared in cooperation with Polish avant-garde artists. Henryk Stażewski designed the cover for the book.

Over the next two decades, Mondrian methodically developed his signature style embracing the Classical, Platonic, Euclidean worldview where he simply focused on his, now iconic, horizontal and vertical black lines forming squares and rectangles filled with primary hues.

=== Paris (1918–1938) ===
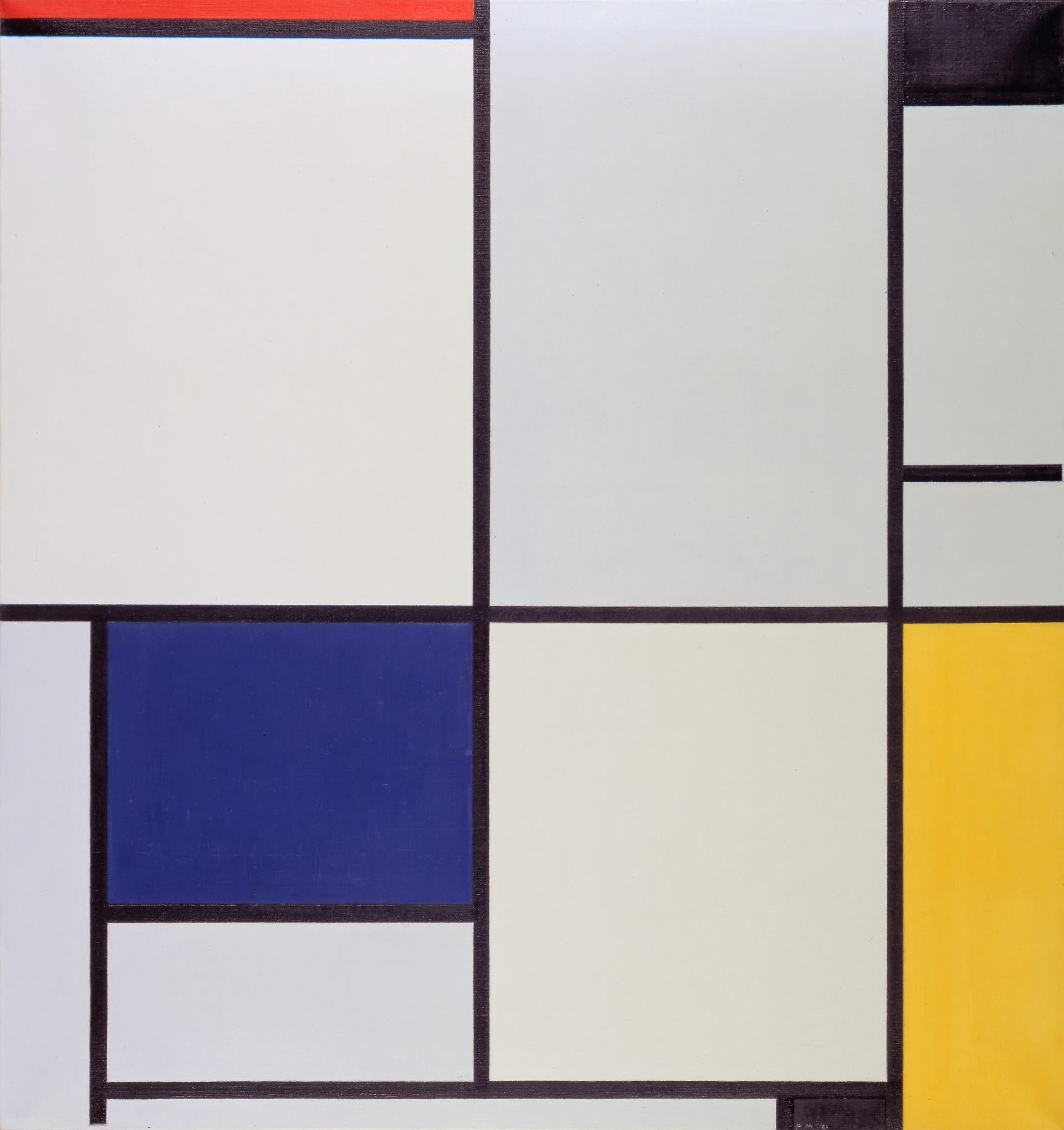
Tableau I, 1921, Kunstmuseum Den Haag

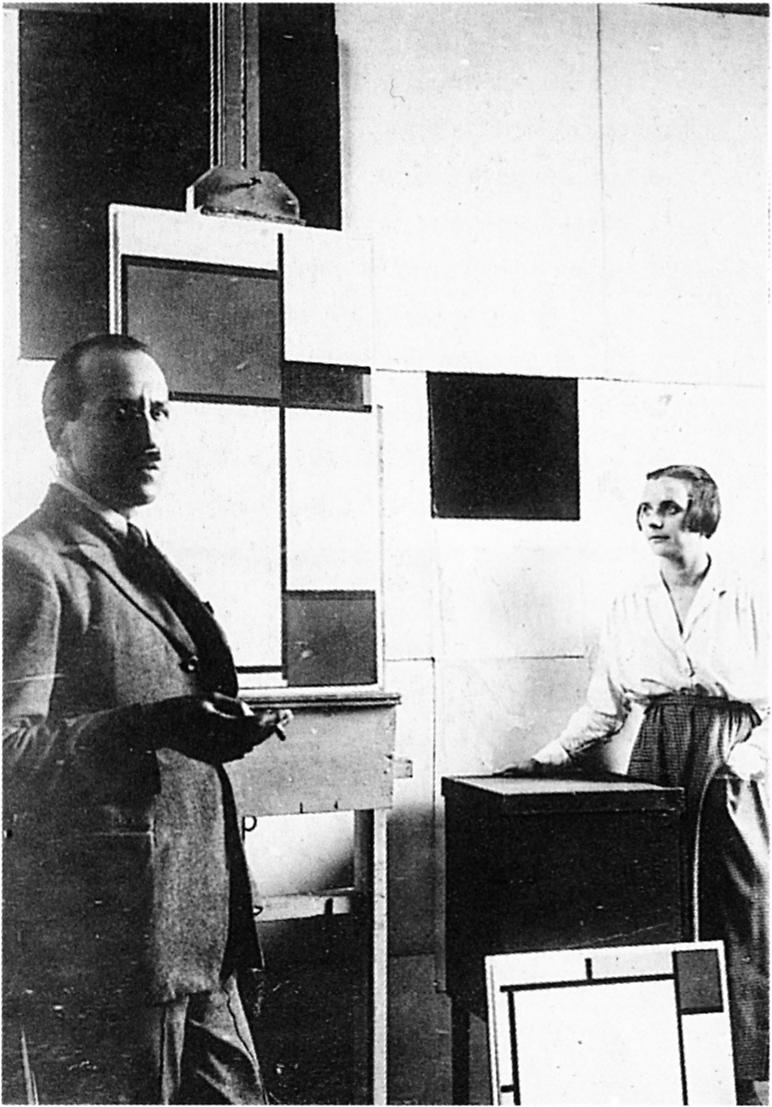
Piet Mondrian and Pétro (Nelly) van Doesburg in Mondrian's Paris studio, 1923

When World War I ended in 1918, Mondrian returned to France, where he would remain until 1938. Immersed in post-war Paris culture of artistic innovation, he flourished and fully embraced the art of pure abstraction for the rest of his life. Mondrian began producing grid-based paintings in late 1919, and in 1920, the style for which he came to be renowned began to appear.

Mondrian believed that "pure abstract art becomes completely emancipated, free of naturalistic appearances. It is no longer natural harmony but creates equivalent relationships. The realization of equivalent relationships is of the highest importance for life."

In the early paintings of this style, the lines delineating the rectangular forms are relatively thin, and they are gray, not black. The lines also tend to fade as they approach the edge of the painting, rather than stopping abruptly. The forms themselves, smaller and more numerous than in later paintings, are filled with primary colors, black, or gray, and nearly all of them are colored; only a few are left white.

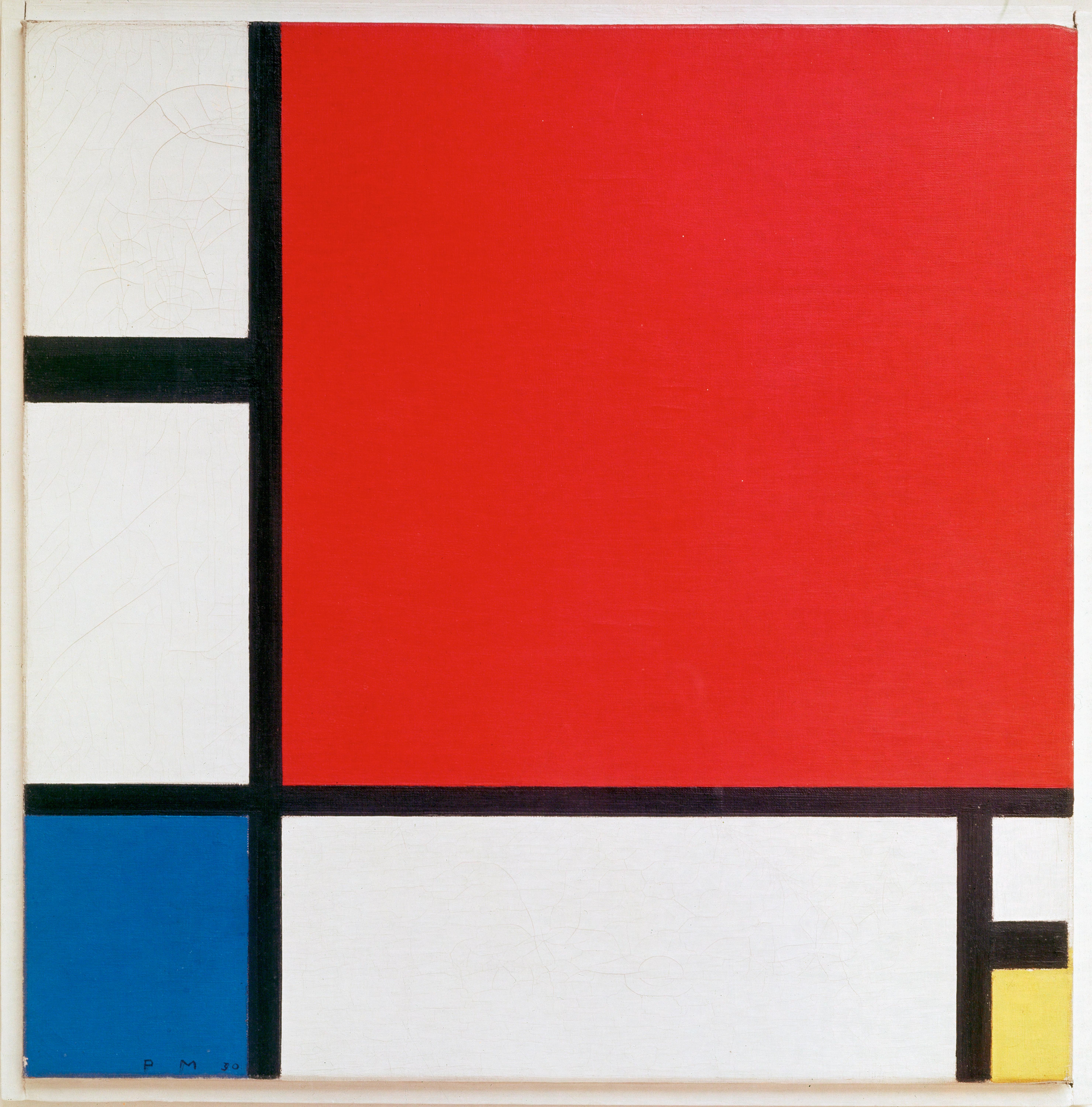
Composition II in Red, Blue, and Yellow, 1930, Kunsthaus Zürich

During late 1920 and 1921, Mondrian's paintings arrive at what is to casual observers their definitive and mature form. Thick black lines now separate the forms, which are larger and fewer in number, and more of the forms are left white. This was not the culmination of his artistic evolution, however. Although the refinements became subtler, Mondrian's work continued to evolve during his years in Paris.

In the 1921 paintings, many, though not all, of the black lines stop short at a seemingly arbitrary distance from the edge of the canvas, although the divisions between the rectangular forms remain intact. Here, too, the rectangular forms remain mostly colored. As the years passed and Mondrian's work evolved further, he began extending all of the lines to the edges of the canvas, and he began to use fewer and fewer colored forms, favoring white instead.

These tendencies are particularly obvious in the "lozenge" works that Mondrian began producing with regularity in the mid-1920s. The "lozenge" paintings are square canvases tilted 45 degrees, so that they have a diamond shape. Typical of these is Schilderij No. 1: Lozenge With Two Lines and Blue (1926). One of the most minimal of Mondrian's canvases, this painting consists only of two black, perpendicular lines and a small blue triangular form. The lines extend all the way to the edges of the canvas, almost giving the impression that the painting is a fragment of a larger work.

Although one's view of the painting is hampered by the glass protecting it, and by the toll that age and handling have obviously taken on the canvas, a close examination of this painting begins to reveal something of the artist's method. The painting is not composed of perfectly flat planes of color, as one might expect. Subtle brush strokes are evident throughout. The artist appears to have used different techniques for the various elements. The black lines are the flattest elements, with the least depth. The colored forms have the most obvious brush strokes, all running in one direction. Most interesting, however, are the white forms, which clearly have been painted in layers, using brush strokes running in different directions. This generates a greater sense of depth in the white forms so that they appear to overwhelm the lines and the colors, which indeed they were doing, as Mondrian's paintings of this period came to be increasingly dominated by white space.

In 1926, Katherine Dreier, co-founder of New York City's Society of Independent Artists (along with Marcel Duchamp and Man Ray), visited Piet Mondrian's studio in Paris and acquired one of his diamond compositions, Painting I. This was then shown during an exhibition organized by the Society of Independent Artists in the Brooklyn Museum – the first major exhibition of modern art in America since the Armory Show. She stated in the catalog that "Holland has produced three great painters who, though a logical expression of their own country, rose above it through the vigor of their personality – the first was Rembrandt, the second was Van Gogh, and the third is Mondrian."

As the years progressed, lines began to take precedence over forms in Mondrian's paintings. In the 1930s, he began to use thinner lines and double lines more frequently, punctuated with a few small colored forms, if any at all. Double lines particularly excited Mondrian, for he believed they offered his paintings a new dynamism which he was eager to explore. The introduction of the double line in his work was influenced by the work of his friend and contemporary Marlow Moss.

From 1934 to 1935, three of Mondrian's paintings were exhibited as part of the "Abstract and Concrete" exhibitions in the UK at Oxford, London, and Liverpool.

=== London and New York (1938–1944) ===
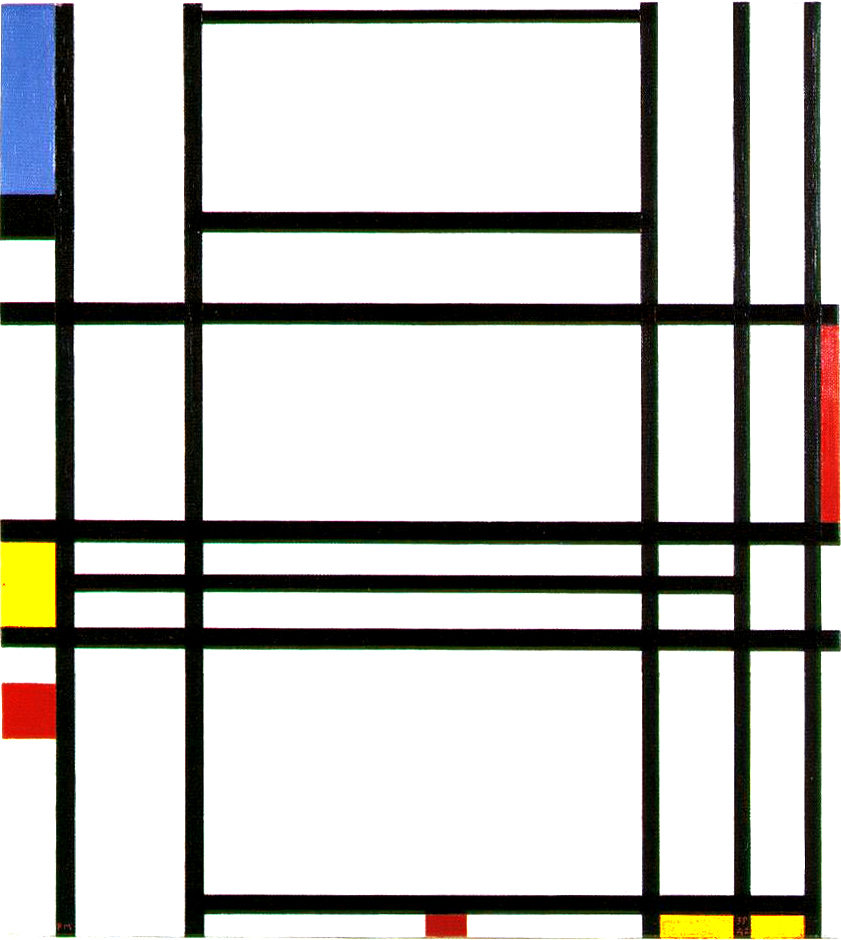
Composition No. 10 (1939–1942), oil on canvas, private collection. Fellow De Stijl artist Theo van Doesburg suggested a link between non-representational works of art and ideals of peace and spirituality.

In September 1938, Mondrian left Paris in the face of advancing fascism and moved to London. After the Netherlands was invaded and Paris fell in 1940, he left London for Manhattan in New York City, where he would remain until his death. Some of Mondrian's later works are difficult to place in terms of his artistic development because there were quite a few canvases that he began in Paris or London and only completed months or years later in Manhattan. The finished works from this later period are visually busy, with more lines than any of his work since the 1920s, placed in an overlapping arrangement that is almost cartographical in appearance. He spent many long hours painting on his own until his hands blistered, and he sometimes cried or made himself sick.

Mondrian produced Lozenge Composition With Four Yellow Lines (1933), a simple painting that innovated thick, colored lines instead of black ones. After that one painting, this practice remained dormant in Mondrian's work until he arrived in Manhattan, at which time he began to embrace it with abandon. In some examples of this new direction, such as Composition (1938) / Place de la Concorde (1943), he appears to have taken unfinished black-line paintings from Paris and completed them in New York by adding short perpendicular lines of different colors, running between the longer black lines, or from a black line to the edge of the canvas. The newly colored areas are thick, almost bridging the gap between lines and forms, and it is startling to see color in a Mondrian painting that is unbounded by black. Other works mix long lines of red amidst the familiar black lines, creating a new sense of depth by the addition of a colored layer on top of the black one. His painting Composition No. 10, 1939–1942, characterized by primary colors, white ground and black grid lines clearly defined Mondrian's radical but classical approach to the rectangle.

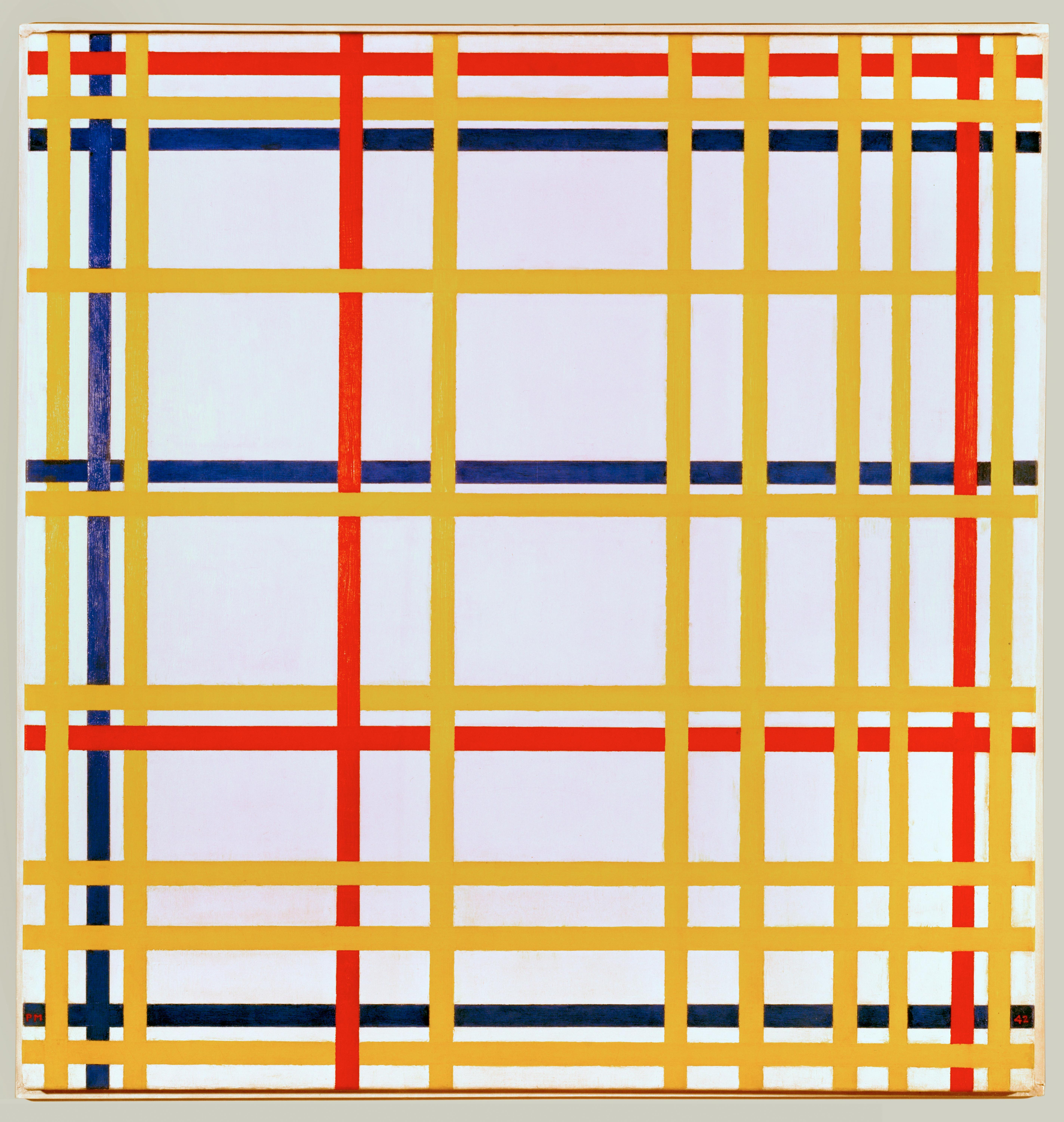
New York City (1942), Paris, Centre Pompidou.

On 23 September 1940 Mondrian left Europe for New York aboard the Cunard White Star Line ship RMS Samaria (1920), departing from Liverpool. Composition Number 12, started in 1936 in Paris, was carried to Mondrian when he emigrated to New York, where he completed the painting in 1942 - one of Mondrian's so called 'transatlantic paintings'. It now hangs in Ottawa, in the National Gallery of Canada.

The new canvases that Mondrian began in Manhattan are even more startling, and indicate the beginning of a new idiom that was cut short by the artist's death. New York City (1942) is a complex lattice of red, blue, and yellow lines, occasionally interlacing to create a greater sense of depth than his previous works. An unfinished 1941 version of this work, titled New York City I, uses strips of painted paper tape, which the artist could rearrange at will to experiment with different designs. In October 2022 it was revealed that the work, which was first displayed at the Museum of Modern Art (MoMA) in New York in 1945, had been displayed upside down, since at least 1980, at the Kunstsammlung Nordrhein-Westfalen in Germany, where it is now held. The gallery explained that it would continue to display it the wrong way up to avoid damaging it.

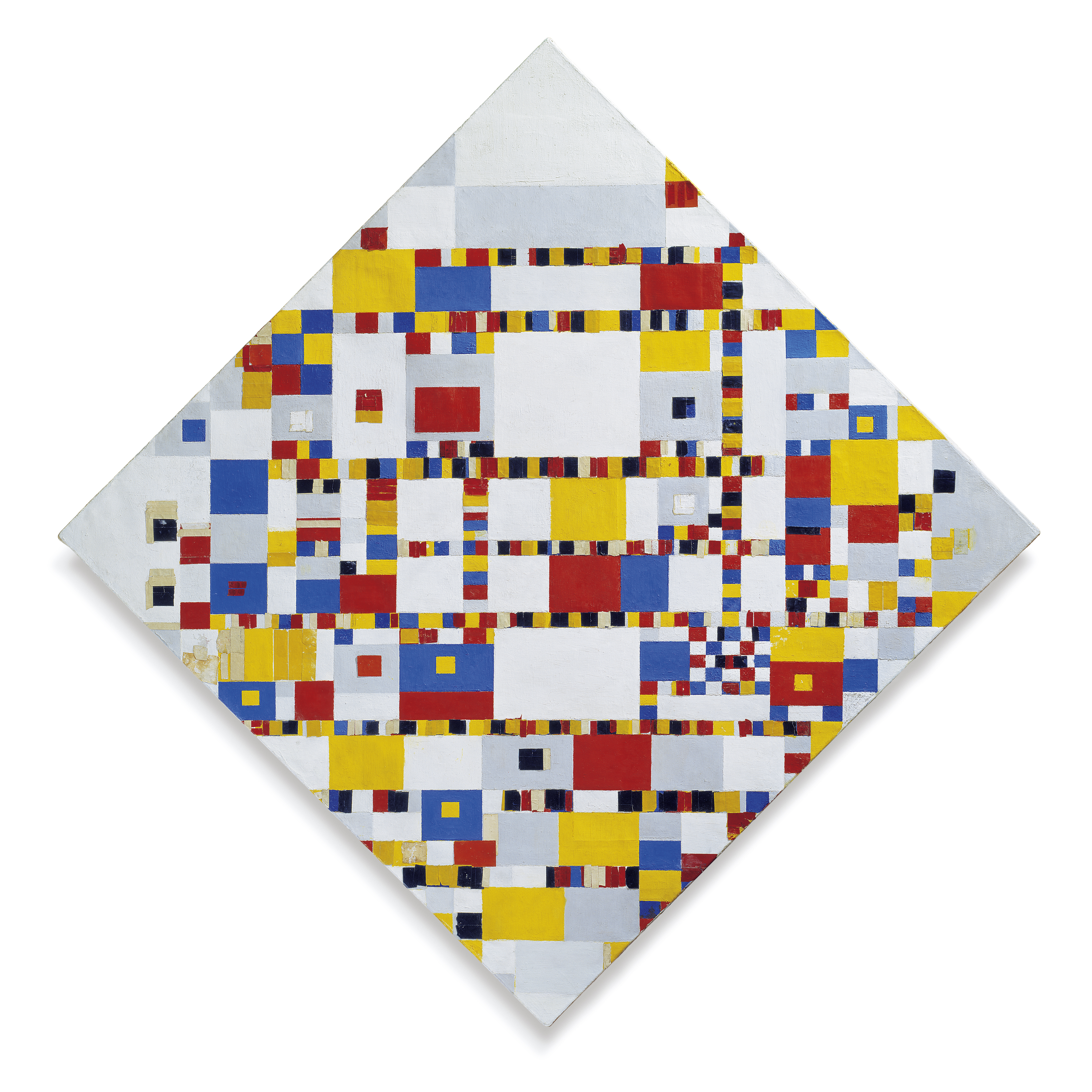
Victory Boogie Woogie (1942–1944), Kunstmuseum Den Haag

His painting Broadway Boogie-Woogie (1942–43) at the Museum of Modern Art was highly influential in the school of abstract geometric painting. The piece is made up of a number of shimmering squares of bright color that leap from the canvas, drawing the viewer into those neon lights. In this painting and the unfinished Victory Boogie Woogie (1942–1944), Mondrian replaced former solid lines with lines created from small adjoining rectangles of color, created in part by using small pieces of paper tape in various colors. Larger unbounded rectangles of color punctuate the design, some with smaller concentric rectangles inside them. While Mondrian's works of the 1920s and 1930s tend to have an almost scientific austerity about them, these are bright, lively paintings, reflecting the upbeat music that inspired them and the city in which they were made.

In these final works, the forms have indeed usurped the role of the lines, opening another new door for Mondrian's development as an abstractionist. The Boogie-Woogie paintings were clearly more of a revolutionary change than an evolutionary one, representing the most profound development in Mondrian's work since his abandonment of representational art in 1913.

In 2008 the Dutch television program Andere Tijden found the only known movie footage with Mondrian. The discovery of the film footage was announced at the end of a two-year research program on the Victory Boogie Woogie. The research found that the painting was in very good condition and that Mondrian painted the composition in one session. It also was found that the composition was changed radically by Mondrian shortly before his death by using small pieces of colored tape.

=== Wall works ===
When the 47-year-old Piet Mondrian left the Netherlands for unfettered Paris for the second and last time in 1919, he set about at once to make his studio a nurturing environment for paintings he had in mind that would increasingly express the principles of neoplasticism about which he had been writing for two years. To hide the studio's structural flaws quickly and inexpensively, he tacked up large rectangular placards, each in a single color or neutral hue. Smaller colored paper squares and rectangles, composed together, accented the walls. Then came an intense period of painting. Again he addressed the walls, repositioning the colored cutouts, adding to their number, altering the dynamics of color and space, producing new tensions and equilibrium. Before long, he had established a creative schedule in which a period of painting took turns with a period of experimentally regrouping the smaller papers on the walls, a process that directly fed the next period of painting. It was a pattern he followed for the rest of his life, through wartime moves from Paris to London's Hampstead in 1938 and 1940, across the Atlantic to Manhattan.

At the age of 71 in the fall of 1943, Mondrian moved into his second and final Manhattan studio at 15 East 59th Street, and set about to recreate the environment he had learned over the years was congenial to his way of life and stimulating to his art. He painted the high walls the same off-white he used on his easel and on the seats, tables and storage cases he designed and fashioned from discarded orange and apple-crates. He glossed the top of a white metal stool in the same primary red he applied to the cardboard sheath he made for the radio-phonograph that played his beloved jazz from well-traveled records. Visitors to this last studio seldom saw more than one or two new canvases, but found, often to their astonishment, that eight large compositions of colored bits of paper he had tacked and re-tacked to the walls in ever-changing relationships constituted together an environment that, paradoxically and simultaneously, was both kinetic and serene, stimulating and restful. It was the best space, Mondrian said, that he had inhabited. He was there for only a few months, as he died in February 1944.

After his death, Mondrian's friend and sponsor in Manhattan, artist Harry Holtzman, and another painter friend, Fritz Glarner, carefully documented the studio on film and in still photographs before opening it to the public for a six-week exhibition. Before dismantling the studio, Holtzman (who was also Mondrian's heir) traced the wall compositions precisely, prepared exact portable facsimiles of the space each had occupied, and affixed to each the original surviving cut-out components. These portable Mondrian compositions have become known as "The Wall Works". Since Mondrian's death, they have been exhibited twice at Manhattan's Museum of Modern Art (1983 and 1995–96), once in SoHo at the Carpenter + Hochman Gallery (1984), once each at the Galerie Tokoro in Tokyo, Japan (1993), the XXII Biennial of São Paulo (1994), the University of Michigan (1995), and – the first time shown in Europe – at the Akademie der Künste (Academy of The Arts), in Berlin (22 February – 22 April 2007). His work was also shown in a retrospective exhibition at the Whitechapel Gallery in London, which ran from August to September 1955.

== Mondrian's flowers ==
While Mondrian's theories of abstraction have been his enduring legacy, he was also a painter of flowers. He began to paint flowers at the turn of the century, creating portraits of individual blooms that blended his strict artistic training and powers of observation to his spiritual and romantic yearnings. Mondrian continued to paint flowers in a secretive manner into the 1920s, claiming to friends that he did so for commercial reasons alone. The flower paintings were created under the taboo that was cast upon traditional genre and representational painting by an entire age swept up by the triumph of abstraction. Nevertheless, the Mondrian flowers contribute to a broader view of the life and work of Mondrian – a view that diverges sharply from the traditional reading of his artistic evolution.

== Personality ==
In a review of a 2024 biography of Mondrian, The New York Times book critic Dwight Garner described him as a "deeply eccentric man" who "lived like an ambassador from the kingdom of ridiculous notions" and who "had no sense of humor and rarely smiled". He was a follower of phrenology and spiritualism and fad diets and "didn't believe in ice cubes because cold food was bad for the health".

According to Nicholas Fox Weber, author of a 2018 biography of Mondrian, the artist was so deeply afraid of eye injuries that he refused to play with his brothers as a child. He was also afraid of spiders. He once fell asleep during a concert and started screaming loudly when he woke up and spotted a spider. He never married, never had any long-lasting relationships and always ate alone.

In his 2025 biography of Mondrian, Weber notes the contradictions, for on one hand "he (Mondrian) lived alone, survived largely on lentils and coffee, built his own furniture out of fruit crates and avoided romantic relationships on the grounds that they obstructed his work and led to obligations." That contrasts with "the myths about Mondrian is that he was a recluse, uninterested in any scene. In fact, though he squirrelled himself away during working hours ... in the evenings it was a different story. His favourite thing to do, from his days in Amsterdam onwards, was to go out dancing. He was a regular at the glitzy Hotel Hamdorff in Laren, where he danced waltzes and tangos 'very slowly', keeping his body almost totally rigid. In Paris, he discovered jazz and the Charleston and took women friends to the Jungle Bar and Le Petit Teddy ... In 1939, living in North London, he would stroll down to Camden Town to dance at the Camden Palace or the Bedford. The year before his seventieth birthday, he marked his 'emergence from a long bout of rheumatism' with a wild night out at Café Society in New York."

== Death and legacy ==
Mondrian died of pneumonia on 1 February 1944 and was interred at the Cypress Hills Cemetery in Queens, New York.

On 3 February 1944, a memorial was held for Mondrian at the Universal Chapel on Lexington Avenue and 52nd Street in Manhattan. The service was attended by nearly 200 people including Alexander Archipenko, Marc Chagall, Marcel Duchamp, Fernand Léger, Alexander Calder and Robert Motherwell.

The Mondrian / Holtzman Trust functions as Mondrian's official estate, and "aims to promote awareness of Mondrian's artwork and to ensure the integrity of his work".

The critic Robert Hughes, in his 1980 book The Shock of the New, described Mondrian as "one of the supreme artists of the 20th century." In his television documentaries of The Shock of the New, Hughes referred to Mondrian as "one of the greatest artists of the 20th century (...) who was one of the last painters who believed that the conditions of human life could be changed by making pictures". Dutch art historian Carel Blotkamp, an authority on De Stijl, reaffirmed the belief that he was "one of the great artists of the twentieth century".

In 2022, design historian Stephen Bayley wrote: "Mondrian has come to mean Modernism. His name and his work sum up the High Modernist ideal. I don't like the word 'iconic', so let's say that he's become totemic – a totem for everything Modernism set out to be."

On 14 November 2022, Mondrian's Composition No. II was sold at Sotheby's Auction for US $51 million, which beat a previous record of US $50.6 million for his work. Composition No. II features a 20-inch by 20-inch canvas with a large red square in the upper right corner, a small blue square in the bottom left corner, and a yellow block with all outlined by black.

Mondrian's Composition With Large Red Plane, Bluish Gray, Yellow, Black and Blue was sold for $47.6 million at a Christie's auction in 2025.

== Claims for Nazi looted art ==
In October 2020, Mondrian's heirs filed a lawsuit in a U.S. court against the Kaiser Wilhelm Museum in Krefeld, Germany, for the return of four paintings by Mondrian. By October 2025 the United States District Court for the District of Columbia had declared it has no jurisdiction to hear the case.

In December 2021, Mondrian's heirs sued the Philadelphia Museum of Art for the return of Mondrian's Composition with Blue (1928), which had been seized by the Nazis and had passed through the art dealers Karl Buchholz and Curt Valentin before being gifted to the museum by Albert E. Gallatin.

== References in culture ==
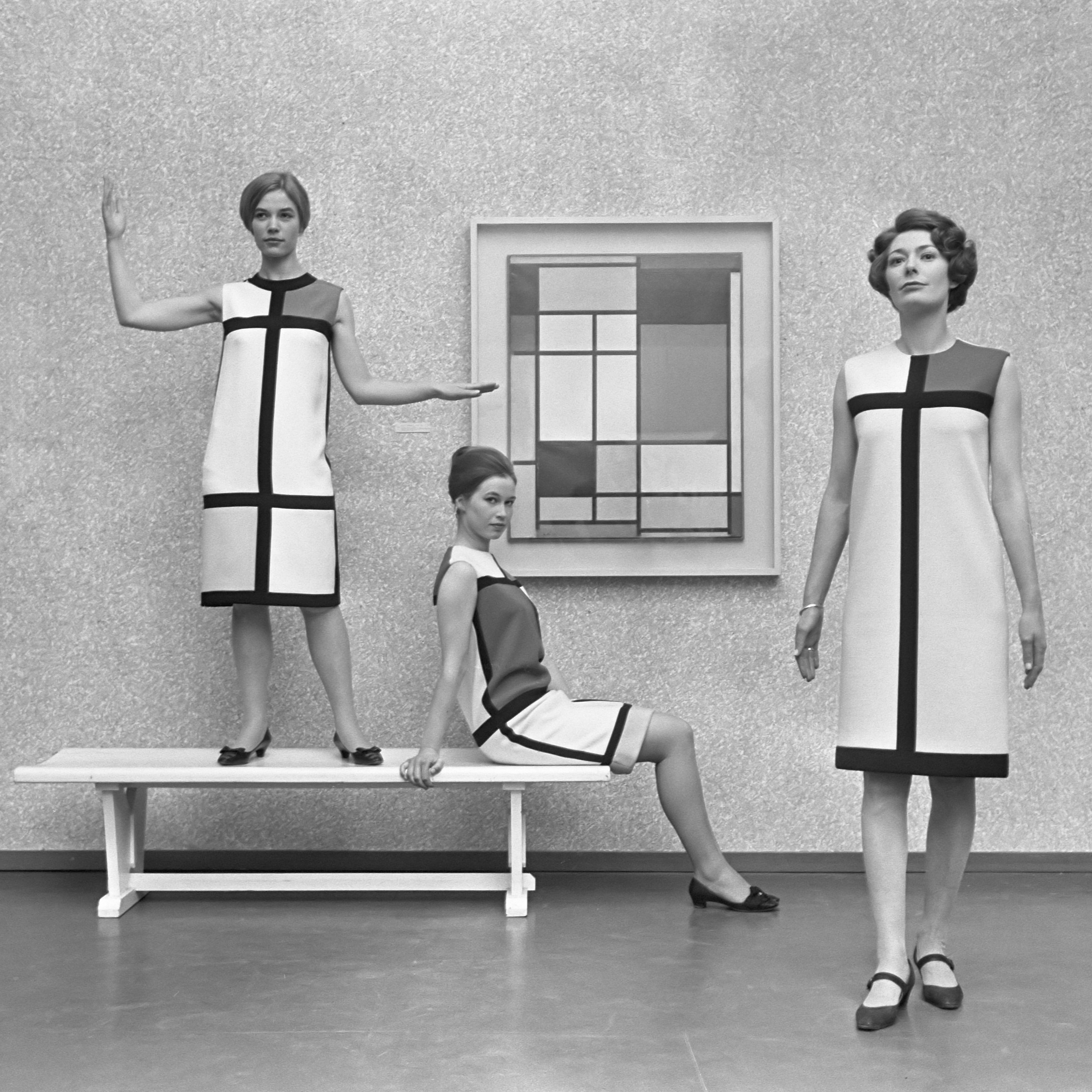
Mondrian dresses by Yves Saint Laurent shown with a Mondrian painting in 1966.

- The National Museum of Serbia was the first museum to include one of Mondrian's paintings in its permanent exhibition.
- Along with Klee and Kandinsky, Mondrian was one of the main inspirations to the early pointillist musical aesthetic of serialist composer Pierre Boulez, although his interest in Mondrian was restricted to the works of 1914–15. By May 1949 Boulez said he was "suspicious of Mondrian", and by December 1951 expressed a dislike for his paintings (regarding them as "the most denuded of mystery that have ever been in the world"), and a strong preference for Paul Klee.
- In the 1930s, the French fashion designer Lola Prusac, who worked at that time for Hermès in Paris, designed a range of luggage and bags inspired by the latest works of Mondrian: inlays of red, blue, and yellow leather squares.
- Fashion designer Yves Saint Laurent's Fall 1965 Mondrian collection featured shift dresses in blocks of primary color with black bordering, inspired by Mondrian. The collection proved so popular that it inspired a range of imitations that encompassed garments from coats to boots.
- The title sequence of the 1965–1971 American absurdist TV sitcom Green Acres features actress Eva Gabor singing her portion of the theme song in her New York penthouse apartment with a Mondrian painting hanging in the background.
- The 1970–1974 American television serial The Partridge Family featured a musical family who purchase a 1957 Chevrolet Superior Coach Series 6800 school bus for use as their tour bus, and then repaint it in a colored geometric pattern heavily inspired by Mondrian's grid-based paintings. The reason for this choice of pattern is never discussed in the TV series.
- The La Vie Claire cycling team's bicycles and clothing designs were inspired by Mondrian's work throughout the 1980s. The French ski and bicycle equipment manufacturer Look, which also sponsored the team, used a Mondrian-inspired logo for a while. The style was revived in 2008 for a limited edition frame.
- 1980s R&B group Force MDs created a music video for their hit "Love is a House", superimposing themselves performing inside of digitally drawn squares inspired by Composition II.
- Piet is an esoteric programming language named after Piet Mondrian in which programs look like abstract art.
- Mondrian is a software for interactive data visualization named after him.
- Mondrian is a functional scripting language designed by Microsoft Research for the .NET platform.
- Mondrian is a web-based code review system written in Python and used within Google.
- Mondrian is an open source OLAP (online analytical processing) server written in Java.
- Mondrian is an extension of the Conformal Prediction machine learning framework.
- An episode of the BBC TV drama Hustle titled "Picture Perfect" is about the team attempting to create and sell a Mondrian forgery. To do so, they must steal a real Mondrian (Composition with Red, Yellow, Blue, and Black, 1921) from an art gallery.
- In 2001–2003 British artist Keith Milow made a series of paintings based on the so-called Transatlantic Paintings (1935–1940) by Mondrian.
- The Mondrian is a 20-story high-rise in the Cityplace neighborhood of Oak Lawn, Dallas, Texas, US. Construction started on the structure in 2003, and the building was completed in 2005.
- In 2008, Nike released a pair of Dunk Low SB shoes inspired by Mondrian's neo-plastic paintings.
- The front cover to Australian rock band Silverchair's fifth and final album Young Modern (2007) is a tribute to Piet Mondrian's Composition II in Red, Blue, and Yellow. The design also features prominently in the music video for "Reflections of a Sound", a single from the album.
- The cover art of American psychedelic pop indie rock band The Apples in Stereo's second album, Tone Soul Evolution (1997), was inspired by Piet Mondrian.
- The music video for English pop duo La Roux's song Bulletproof features visual elements inspired by Mondrian's paintings.
- The Hague City Council honored Mondrian by adorning walls of City Hall with reproductions of his works and describing it as "the largest Mondrian painting in the world." The event celebrated the 100th year of the Stijl movement which Mondrian helped to found.
- The Jersey Surf Drum & Bugle Corps performed a show based on Piet Mondrian in their 2018 production titled [mondo mondrian].
- In collaboration with the Thyssen-Bornemisza Museum in Madrid, Swatch created a watch called the "Red Shiny Line (SUOZ297)" which pays tribute to Mondrian's "New York City, 3". This was followed in 2022 by the watch "RED, BLUE AND WHITE, BY PIET MONDRIAN (SUOZ344)" which celebrates the painting Composition in Red, Blue and White II as part of a collaboration between Swatch and Centre Pompidou.
- The building facades and design details of Chun Yeung Estate, a public housing estate in Fo Tan, Hong Kong, was inspired by geometric elements from Mondrian's work according to the Housing Department's architectural project team.
- In 2022, Tecno, in Partnership with Museum of Fine Arts, released a Special Edition of their Camon 19 Pro smartphone, incorporating his paintings into its design.
- The most expensive painting by Mondrian was sold for $51 million in 2022.

== Commemoration ==
From 6 June to 5 October 2014, the Tate Liverpool displayed the largest UK collection of Mondrian's works, in commemoration of the 70th anniversary of his death. Mondrian and his Studios included a life-size reconstruction of his Paris studio. Charles Darwent, in The Guardian, wrote: "With its black floor and white walls hung with moveable panels of red, yellow and blue, the studio at Rue du Départ was not just a place for making Mondrians. It was a Mondrian – and a generator of Mondrians." He has been described as "the world's greatest abstract geometrist".

== See also ==
- Fourth dimension in art
- List of claims for restitution of Nazi-looted art
- Mondrian and Theosophy

== Sources ==
- Apollonio, Umbro (1965). Piet Mondrian, Milano: Fabri 1976. (in Italian) OCLC 797122720
- Bax, Marty (2001). Complete Mondrian. Aldershot (Hampshire) and Burlington (Vermont): Lund Humphries. ISBN 0-85331-803-4 (cloth) ISBN 0-85331-822-0 (pbk).
- Blotkamp, Carel (1994). Mondrian: The Art of Destruction. London: Reaction Books Ltd. ISBN 9781861891006. OCLC 49597291.
- Bois, Yve-Alain (1993). Painting as model (1. ed.). Cambridge, Mass.: MIT Press. ISBN 0-262-52180-6.
- Boulez, Pierre; Cage, John (1993). Nattiez, Jean-Jacques (ed.). The Boulez-Cage Correspondence. Translated by Samuels, Robert. Cambridge [England]: Cambridge University Press. ISBN 0-521-40144-5.
- Busignani, Alberto (1968). Mondrian: The Life and Work of the Artist, Illustrated by 80 Colour Plates. Translated by Beamish, Caroline. Thames & Hudson. OCLC 481061.
- Marwick, Arthur (2000). "The Art of Total War". In Chickering, Roger; Förster, Stig (eds.). Great War, Total War: Combat and Mobilization on the Western Front, 1914-1918. Washington, D.C.: German Historical Institute. ISBN 0-521-77352-0.
- Cooper, Harry (1997). Dialectics of Painting: Mondrian's Diamond Series, 1918-44 (Thesis). Harvard.
- Deicher, Susanne (1995). Piet Mondrian, 1872–1944: Structures in Space. Cologne: Benedikt Taschen. ISBN 3-8228-8885-0.
- Larousse and Co., Inc. (1976). Mondrian, Piet. In Dictionary of Painters (p. 285). New York: Larousse and Co., Inc.
- Hajdu, István (1987). Piet Mondrian. Pantheon. Budapest: Corvina Kiadó. ISBN 963-13-2265-3. (in Hungarian)
- Faerna, José María (ed.) (1997). Mondrian Great Modern Masters. New York: Cameo/Abrams. ISBN 0-8109-4687-4.
- Gamwell, L. (2020). Exploring the Invisible: Art, Science, and the Spiritual – Revised and Expanded Edition. United Kingdom: Princeton University Press. ISBN 978-06-911910-58.
- Gardner, Helen (2006). Gardner's art through the ages: the Western perspective (12 ed.). Belmont, CA: Thomson/Wadsworth. p. 780. ISBN 0-495-00479-0.
- Gooding, Mel (2001). Abstract Art. Movements in Modern Art. London: Tate Publishing; Cambridge and New York: Cambridge University Press. ISBN 1-85437-302-1 (Tate); ISBN 0-521-80928-2 (Cambridge, cloth); ISBN 0-521-00631-7 (Cambridge, pbk).
- Guerrand, Jean R. (1988). Souvenirs cousus sellier: un demi-siècle chez Hermès [Saddle stitched memories: half a century at Hermès]. Paris: Oliver Orban. ISBN 2-85565-377-0.
- Hughes, Robert (1980). "Trouble in Utopia". The Shock of the New. British Broadcasting Corporation. ISBN 0-563-17780-2.
- Howarth, Lucy (2019). Marlow Moss. London: Eiderdown Books. ISBN 978-1-9160416-2-2.
- Introvigne, Massimo (2014). "From Mondrian to Charmion von Wiegand: Neoplasticism, Theosophy and Buddhism". In Noble, Judith; Shepherd, Dominic; Ansell, Robert (eds.). Black Mirror 0: Territory. Fulgur Esoterica. OCLC 1135572195.
- Janssen, Hans (2008). Mondriaan in het Gemeentemuseum Den Haag. [The Hague]: Gemeentemuseum Den Haag. ISBN 978-90-400-8443-0
- Locher, Hans (1994) Piet Mondrian: Colour, Structure, and Symbolism: An Essay. Bern: Verlag Gachnang & Springer. ISBN 978-3-906127-44-6
- Lodder, Christina; Kokkori, Maria; Mileeva, Maria (2013). Utopian Reality: Reconstructing Culture in Revolutionary Russia and Beyond. Leiden: Brill. ISBN 978-90-04-26322-2.
- Milner, John (1992). Mondrian. London: Phaidon. ISBN 0-7148-2659-6.
- Milner, John (1995). Mondrian (1. ed.). London: Phaidon. ISBN 0-7148-3167-0.
- Mondrian, Piet (1986). The New Art – The New Life: The Collected Writings of Piet Mondrian, edited by Harry Holtzman and Martin S. James. Documents of 20th-Century Art. Boston: G. K. Hall and Co. ISBN 0-8057-9957-5. Reprinted 1987, London: Thames and Hudson. ISBN 0-500-60011-2. Reprinted 1993, New York: Da Capo Press. ISBN 0-306-80508-1.
- Schapiro, Meyer (1995). Mondrian: On the Humanity of Abstract Painting. New York: George Braziller. ISBN 0-8076-1369-X (cloth) ISBN 0-8076-1370-3 (pbk).
- Sellon, Emily B.; Weber, Renee (1992). "Theosophy and the Theosophical Society". In Faivre, Antoine; Needleman, Jacob (eds.). Modern Esoteric Spirituality. World Spirituality. Vol. 21. Crossroad. ISBN 0-824-51444-0.
- Seuphor, Michel (1956). Piet Mondrian: Life and Work. New York: H. N. Abrams. p. 117.
- Stacey, Peter F. (1987). Boulez and the modern concept. Lincoln: University of Nebraska Press. ISBN 0-8032-4183-6.
- Strauss, Walter A. (1989). "Review of Boulez and the Modern Concept". SubStance. 18 (2). doi:10.2307/3685321. ISSN 0049-2426. JSTOR 3685321.
- Welsh, Robert P., Joop J. Joosten, and Henk Scheepmaker (1998). Piet Mondrian: Catalogue Raisonné, translated by Jacques Bosser. Blaricum: V+K Publishing/Inmerc. ISBN 9780810942875 OCLC 34548331
- Wiegand, Charmion (1943). "The Meaning of Mondrian". The Journal of Aesthetics and Art Criticism. 2 (8 (Autumn, 1943)). Blackwell Publishing on behalf of The American Society for Aesthetics: 62–70. doi:10.2307/425946. JSTOR 425946.
