= Evening; Red Tree =

Painting by Piet Mondrian

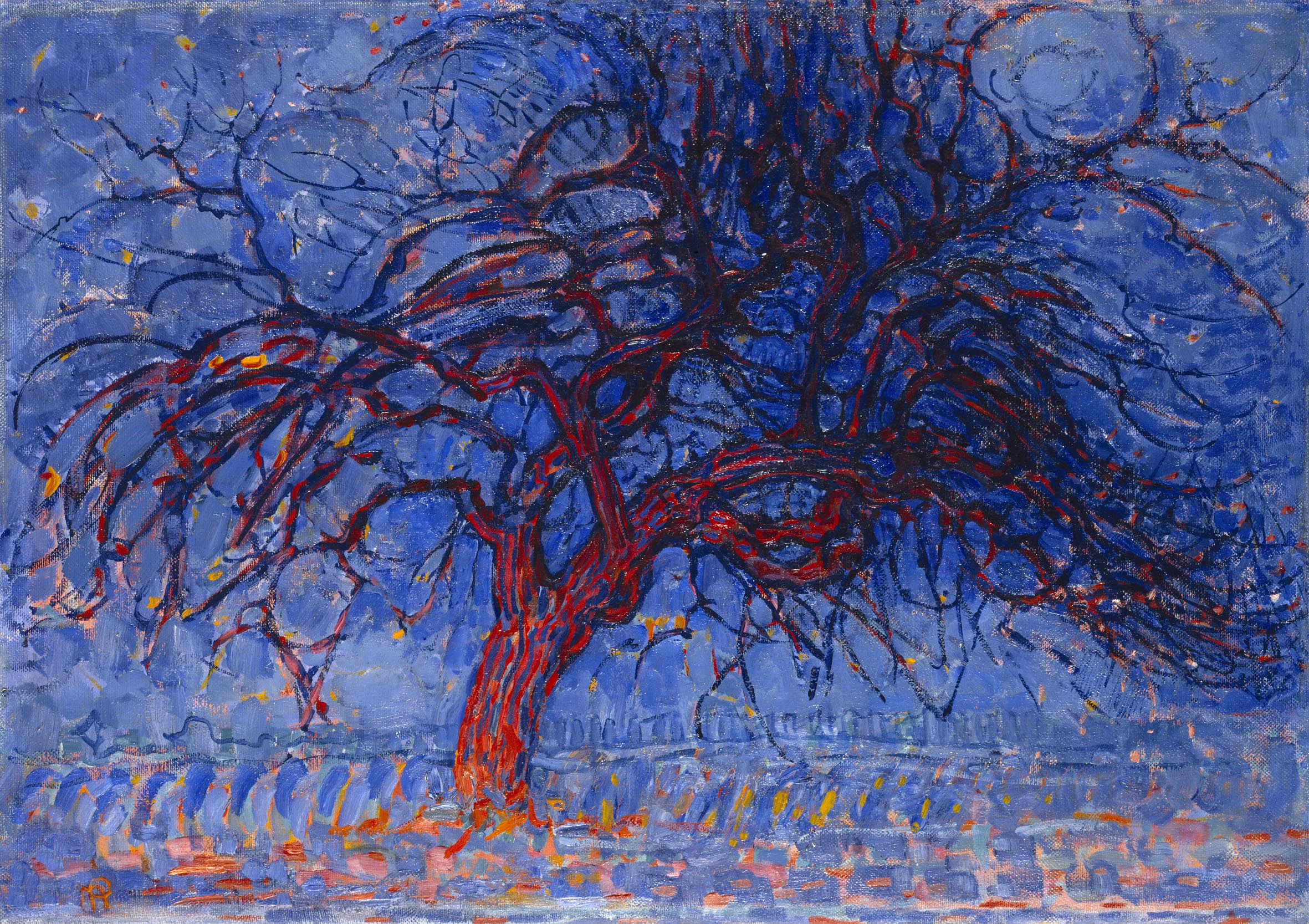
- Artist: Piet Mondrian
- Year: 1908
- Medium: Oil on canvas
- Dimensions: 70 cm × 99 cm (28 in × 39 in)
- Location: Kunstmuseum Den Haag, The Hague

Evening; Red Tree (Avond; De rode boom) is an oil-on-canvas painting by the Dutch artist Piet Mondrian from 1908. It is commonly referred to as The Red Tree. The painting is an Expressionist representation of an apple tree with branches that spread wide across the canvas. The Red Tree is the first painting in Mondrian’s Trees series, which defined an important period of evolution in Mondrian’s work as he transitioned to Neoplasticism. Mondrian used The Red Tree to express his views of nature and reality as a complex equilibrium between harsh motion and quiet stillness. The painting displays non-naturalistic colours and simplified tones of red and blue.

The painting is in the collection of the Kunstmuseum, The Hague.

== Background ==
Prior to 1907, Mondrian’s works were considered consistent with the trends of the time and were well-received by the public. However, in 1907 Mondrian became unsatisfied and his artwork began to change. Mondrian attended a Vincent van Gogh retrospective in 1905 and drew inspiration from van Gogh’s unconventional use of pure colors and gestural brushstrokes. While undergoing his stylistic shift, Mondrian repeatedly used the subject matter of trees, inspired by the poet Émile Veraeren’s "L’Arbre." In the poem, Mondrian saw a shared vision of trees as a powerful source of life connecting the earth and the sky. Notably, Mondrian painted a leafless tree that emphasized strong lines and planes so as to not blur the relationship between the articulate lines of the tree and those of the leaf. Throughout the Trees series, Mondrian continued to simplify the trees and emphasize strong lines until the trees appear to be merely vertical lines with dispersed horizontal lines as branches, foreshadowing Neoplasticism.

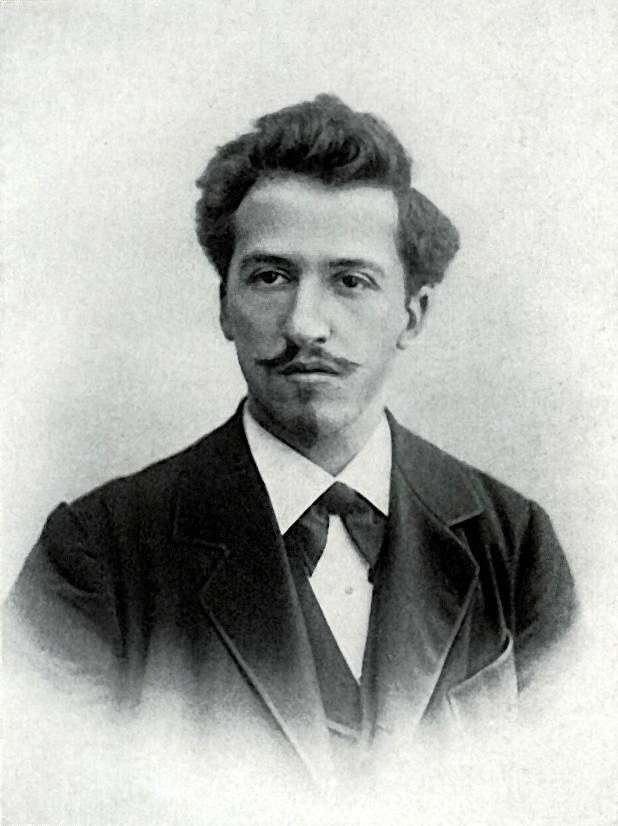
Piet Mondrian, 1872-1944

== Composition and interpretation ==
John Milner has observed that the composition focuses on the conflicting and interconnecting forces of trunk, branches, and surrounding space. Mondrian's tree, much like those of van Gogh, rotates in its growth, branching out across the air in smaller, twisting, extensions. Mondrian uses a firm and solid manner of depicting the tree and the space around it, allowing the two components to tightly combine across the flat canvas. The way in which the small branches of the tree stretch up and spread across both sides of the canvas generates a cross-like arrangement with nature. The tree remains in conflict as forces of air and light pull it upwards toward growth and expansion, and gravity pulls it down into dispersal and decay.

According to Hans Jaffé, The Red Tree is not a simple impression of a tree, but rather an interpretation of reality and nature as a whole. Through a linear structure contrasts the tree's violent movement with the overarching calm of the painting to create a balance.

== Color and brushwork ==
Mondrian's style at the time was characterized by his emphasis on color and his revolt against tonalism. Restricted to red and blue, The Red Tree represents Mondrian’s movement toward non-naturalistic colors. He believed that it was not possible to reproduce the colors of nature on a canvas and thus looked to pure color to express nature's beauty differently. He relied on color to create spatial contrast and produce images that were not simply descriptive, but also to create a symbolic and evocative effect. This is seen through the intense and suggestive contrast of the red forcefully standing out from the receding blue. Mondrian also turned to the application of paint to create depth. His rhythmic and opaque application indicates a greater sense of substance both in the tree and the space around it. His strong but somewhat interrupted brushstrokes resemble aspects of pointillist painting. However, rather than creating an optical effect that causes the brushstrokes to blend in the viewer’s eye like in pointillism, Mondrian uses larger brushstrokes and two dominant contrasting colors to remove any sense of natural light and produce a mystical effect.
