= 1943 in philosophy =

List of years in philosophy
- … 1933; 1934; 1935; 1936; 1937; 1938; 1939; 1940; 1941; 1942; 1943; 1944; 1945; 1946; 1947; 1948; 1949; 1950; 1951; 1952; 1953 …
- Art; Archaeology; Architecture; Literature; Music; Philosophy; Science; +...

1943 in philosophy

== Publications ==
- Georges Bataille, Inner Experience (1943)
- Jean-Paul Sartre, Being and Nothingness (1943)

=== Philosophical literature ===
- Hermann Hesse, The Glass Bead Game (1943)
- Jean Anouilh, Antigone (1943)

== Births ==
- January 20 - Roel van Duijn
- February 22 - Terry Eagleton
- June 9 - Marianne Katoppo
- June 25 - Howard Bloom
- July 16 - Patricia Churchland
- August 10 - John Zerzan
- November 7 - Stephen Greenblatt

== Deaths ==
- February 14 - David Hilbert (born 1862)
- February 22 - Sophie Scholl (born 1921)
- August 24 - Simone Weil (born 1909)
- August 27 – William de Burgh (born 1866)
