= 1944 in philosophy =

List of years in philosophy
- … 1934; 1935; 1936; 1937; 1938; 1939; 1940; 1941; 1942; 1943; 1944; 1945; 1946; 1947; 1948; 1949; 1950; 1951; 1952; 1953; 1954 …
- Art; Archaeology; Architecture; Literature; Music; Philosophy; Science; +...

1944 in philosophy

== Events ==
- Johannes Vilhelm Jensen was awarded the Nobel Prize in Literature "for the rare strength and fertility of his poetic imagination with which is combined an intellectual curiosity of wide scope and a bold, freshly creative style".

== Publications ==
- Ernst Cassirer, An Essay on Man (1944)
- Karl Polanyi, The Great Transformation (1944)
- Erwin Schrödinger, What Is Life? (1944)
- Friedrich Hayek, The Road to Serfdom (1944)
- Charles Stevenson, Ethics and Language (1944)

=== Philosophical literature ===
- Jorge Luis Borges, Ficciones (1944) and A New Refutation of Time (1944)
- Jean-Paul Sartre, No Exit (1944)

== Births ==
- February 23 - Ronald K. Hoeflin, American philosopher
- February 27 - Roger Scruton, English philosopher (d. 2020)
- June 23 - Peter Bieri, Swiss philosopher and novelist
- October 2 - Vernor Vinge, American speculative fiction writer

== Deaths ==
- July 31 - Antoine de Saint-Exupéry (born 1900)
- October 2 - Benjamin Fondane (born 1898)
- December 30 - Romain Rolland (born 1866)
