= 1952 in archaeology =

List of years in archaeology	(table)
- … 1942; 1943; 1944; 1945; 1946; 1947; 1948; 1949; 1950; 1951; 1952; 1953; 1954; 1955; 1956; 1957; 1958; 1959; 1960; 1961; 1962 …
- In science 1949 1950 1951 1952 1953 1954 1955
- Art; Archaeology; Architecture; Literature; Music; Philosophy; Science; +...

Below are notable events in archaeology that occurred in 1952.

== Explorations ==
- Site of Kerkouane discovered by Charles Saumagne.
- Archaeological exploration of Maijishan Grottoes begins.

== Excavations ==
- Alberto Ruz Lhuillier opens the tomb of Pacal the Great at Palenque.
- Major excavations begin at Viking burial site of Lindholm Høje.
- Excavations at Jericho led by Kathleen Kenyon begin (continues to 1958).
- Excavations at the Palace of Nestor in Pylos resume (first started in 1939) by Carl Blegen (continues to 1969).
- Oscar Broneer discovers and begins excavations of the Temple of Poseidon in Isthmia.

== Publications ==
- J. G. D. Clark - Prehistoric Europe: the Economic Basis.
- David Knowles and J. K. S. St Joseph - Monastic Sites from the Air.

== Finds ==
- In Schleswig, Germany, Windeby I and Windeby II, bog bodies, were discovered in a peat bog during a span of three months.
- Another bog body, known as "Grauballe Man" is discovered in Grauballe, Denmark.

== Events ==
- Grahame Clark is elected to the Disney Professorship of Archaeology in the University of Cambridge.
- August 23 - Glyn Daniel begins to present Animal, Vegetable, Mineral? on BBC Television, a game show often featuring other archaeologists and archaeological artefacts.
- Michael Ventris deciphers Minoan Linear B.

== Births ==
- March 30 - Alan Vince, British archaeologist (d. 2009)

== Deaths ==
- Alfred Foucher, French scholar and archaeologist (b. 1865)
