= 1940 in philosophy =

List of years in philosophy
- … 1930; 1931; 1932; 1933; 1934; 1935; 1936; 1937; 1938; 1939; 1940; 1941; 1942; 1943; 1944; 1945; 1946; 1947; 1948; 1949; 1950 …
- Art; Archaeology; Architecture; Literature; Music; Philosophy; Science; +...

1940 in philosophy

== Events ==
- July - Jean-Paul Sartre is taken prisoner by the Germans.
- September 26 or 27 – Walter Benjamin, literary critic and writer, died at the age of 48 when he committed suicide in an effort to avoid capture by the Gestapo.

== Publications ==
- G. H. Hardy, A Mathematician's Apology (1940)
- Nicolai Hartmann, Der Aufbau der realen Welt (published in German in 1940; not yet translated into English)
- Arnold Gehlen, Man: His Nature and Place in the World (1940)

== Births ==
- May 7 - Michael Allen Fox
- June 21 - Michael Ruse
- July 26 - Jean-Luc Nancy
- August 20 - Jacques Bouveresse
- November 13 - Saul Kripke
- November 27 - Bruce Lee (died 1973)
- T. M. Scanlon (unspecified)
- Tu Weiming (unspecified)
- Fatema Mernissi (unspecified)
- Michael Jackson (unspecified)

== Deaths ==
- March 1 - A. H. Tammsaare (born 1878)
- May 14 - Emma Goldman (born 1869)
- August 21 - Leon Trotsky (born 1879)
- September 26 - Walter Benjamin see Events section above
