= 1948 in archaeology =

List of years in archaeology	(table)
- … 1938; 1939; 1940; 1941; 1942; 1943; 1944; 1945; 1946; 1947; 1948; 1949; 1950; 1951; 1952; 1953; 1954; 1955; 1956; 1957; 1958 …
- In science 1945 1946 1947 1948 1949 1950 1951
- Art; Archaeology; Architecture; Literature; Music; Philosophy; Science; +...

Below are notable events in archaeology that occurred in 1948.

== Explorations ==
- Caral site in Peru identified by Paul Kosok.

== Excavations ==
- Excavations at Nippur sponsored by the Oriental Institute of the University of Chicago begin directed by Richard C. Haines.
- Excavations at Kültepe in Turkey resume.

== Publications ==
- Archaeological Institute of America begins publishing the magazine Archaeology.
- Walter W. Taylor publishes A Study of Archeology, a work that carries on from his 1943 PhD dissertation to Harvard University faculty.

== Finds ==
- November - First torc from Snettisham Hoard discovered near King's Lynn, England.
- Therizinosaurus is discovered in Mongolia and is thought to be a very large turtle for several years.

== Awards ==
- Maud Cunnington made CBE for services to archaeology, the first woman archaeologist to receive the honour.

== Miscellaneous ==
- M. M. Postan of Cambridge convenes an influential meeting of archaeologists and historians to discuss the possibilities of excavating medieval peasant houses in England.
- A Roman mosaic pavement from Brantingham in the East Riding of Yorkshire (England) is stolen.

== Births ==
- July 13 - Richard Avent, British archaeologist, conservationist and civil servant (d. 2006)

== Deaths ==
- September 2 - Sylvanus G. Morley, American Mayanist (born 1883).
