= 1948 in philosophy =

List of years in philosophy
- … 1938; 1939; 1940; 1941; 1942; 1943; 1944; 1945; 1946; 1947; 1948; 1949; 1950; 1951; 1952; 1953; 1954; 1955; 1956; 1957; 1958 …
- Art; Archaeology; Architecture; Literature; Music; Philosophy; Science; +...

1948 in philosophy

== Events ==
- January 28 - The Copleston–Russell debate, a debate between Bertrand Russell and Frederick Copleston on the existence of God is broadcast by the BBC in the United Kingdom.
- December 26 - The first series of Reith Lectures, Bertrand Russell on Authority and the Individual, begins broadcasting by the BBC.

== Publications ==
- Erich Rothacker, Probleme der Kulturanthropologie (in German, not yet translated into English, 1948)
- Arnold J. Toynbee, Civilization on Trial (1948)
- Norbert Wiener, Cybernetics: Or Control and Communication in the Animal and the Machine (1948)

== Births ==
- February 12 - Ray Kurzweil
- November 5 - Bernard-Henri Lévy
- November 30 - Hans Moravec

== Deaths ==
- January 30 - Mohandas Karamchand Gandhi (born 1869)
- April 21 - Aldo Leopold (born 1887)
