= 1945 in archaeology =

List of years in archaeology	(table)
- … 1935; 1936; 1937; 1938; 1939; 1940; 1941; 1942; 1943; 1944; 1945; 1946; 1947; 1948; 1949; 1950; 1951; 1952; 1953; 1954; 1955 …
- In science 1942 1943 1944 1945 1946 1947 1948
- Art; Archaeology; Architecture; Literature; Music; Philosophy; Science; +...

Below are notable events in archaeology that occurred in 1945.

== Excavations ==
- Mortimer Wheeler excavates at Arikamedu in Puducherry.

== Finds ==
- December - Nag Hammadi library in Egypt.

== Miscellaneous ==
- W. F. Grimes succeeds Mortimer Wheeler as director of the London Museum.

== Births ==
- January 13 - Francis Pryor, English archaeologist
- February 19 - Barbara Adams, English egyptologist (d. 2002)
- April 16 - Vladas Žulkus, Lithuanian underwater archaeologist
- October 25 - J. P. Mallory, Irish American archaeologist and Indo-Europeanist
- James Peter Allen, American Egyptologist

== Deaths ==
- March 31 - Harriet Boyd Hawes, American archaeologist (b. 1871)
- May 5 - Edgar James Banks, American antiquarian (b. 1866)
- May 31 - Friedrich Sarre, German Orientalist (b. 1865)
- 9 December - Alfred Lucas, English analytical chemist and archaeologist, part of Howard Carter's team at the excavation of Tutankhamun's tomb (b. 1867)
