= 1954 in archaeology =

List of years in archaeology	(table)
- … 1944; 1945; 1946; 1947; 1948; 1949; 1950; 1951; 1952; 1953; 1954; 1955; 1956; 1957; 1958; 1959; 1960; 1961; 1962; 1963; 1964 …
- In science 1951 1952 1953 1954 1955 1956 1957
- Art; Archaeology; Architecture; Literature; Music; Philosophy; Science; +...

The year 1954 in archaeology involved some significant events.

== Excavations ==
- Mixco Viejo, Guatemala Musée d'Homme project under the direction of Henri Lehmann starts (continues through 1967).
- Neolithic-era site of Ashkelon discovered and excavated by French archaeologist Jean Perrot.
- Excavations at Beycesultan by Seton Lloyd of the British Institute of Archaeology in Ankara begin (continue to 1959).
- Excavations at Filitosa, Corsica, begin.
- Excavations at Nagarjunakonda by the Archaeological Survey of India begin (continue to 1960).
- Excavations at Nevasa, Maharashtra, begin (continue to 1956).
- Excavations of the London Mithraeum conducted under the direction of W. F. Grimes.
- Systematic excavations at Niah Caves begin under the direction of the Sarawak Museum.

== Finds ==
- September 18 - Marble head of Mithras from London Mithraeum unearthed in Walbrook Square by W. F. Grimes's excavation.
- Panlongcheng Erligang culture site in China discovered.
- Khufu ship discovered in Giza pyramid complex by Kamal el-Mallakh.
- Cape Gelidonya shipwreck discovered.

== Miscellaneous ==
- Sir Mortimer Wheeler is named Television Personality of the Year in the U.K. due to his contributions to Animal, Vegetable, Mineral?

== Publications ==
- Maurice Beresford - The Lost Villages of England.
- R. Allen Brown - English Medieval Castles.
- Grahame Clark - Excavations at Star Carr, an early Mesolithic site at Seamer near Scarborough, Yorkshire.
- V. E. Nash-Williams - The Roman Frontier in Wales.
- Stuart Piggott - The Neolithic Cultures of the British Isles: a study of the stone-using agricultural communities of Britain in the second millennium B.C.

== Births ==
- July 1 - William Rathje, American archaeologist and garbologist (d. 2012)
- Barbara Tsakirgis, American classical archaeologist (d. 2019)

== Deaths ==
- March 6 - Sir John Myres, English archaeologist of Cyprus (b. 1869)
- April 10 - Ludwig Curtius, German Classical archaeologist (b. 1874)
- July 16 - Henri Frankfort, Dutch-born Egyptologist (b. 1897)
- October 5 - Alfred Tozzer, American Mesoamerican archaeologist (b. 1877)
