= 1935 in philosophy =

List of years in philosophy
- … 1925; 1926; 1927; 1928; 1929; 1930; 1931; 1932; 1933; 1934; 1935; 1936; 1937; 1938; 1939; 1940; 1941; 1942; 1943; 1944; 1945 …
- Art; Archaeology; Architecture; Literature; Music; Philosophy; Science; +...

1935 in philosophy

== Publications ==
=== Philosophical literature ===
- George Santayana, The Last Puritan

== Births ==
- February 2 - Dariush Shayegan, Iranian cultural theorist and philosopher (d. 2018)
- February 17 - Sara Ruddick (d. 2011)
- April 22 - Jerry Fodor, American cognitive scientist (d. 2017)
- May 12 - Sophie Oluwole (d. 2018)
- October 11 - Daniel Quinn (d. 2018)
- October 31 - David Harvey
- November 1 - Edward Said (d. 2003)
- December 14 - Anthony Wilden (d. 2019)
- December 28 - Robert L. Holmes

== Deaths ==
- August 9 - Edmond Goblot
- December 31 - Miguel de Unamuno
