= 1952 in philosophy =

List of years in philosophy
- … 1942; 1943; 1944; 1945; 1946; 1947; 1948; 1949; 1950; 1951; 1952; 1953; 1954; 1955; 1956; 1957; 1958; 1959; 1960; 1961; 1962 …
- Art; Archaeology; Architecture; Literature; Music; Philosophy; Science; +...

1952 in philosophy

== Publications ==
- Lewis White Beck, Philosophic Inquiry: An Introduction to Philosophy (1952)
- Jacques Maritain, The Range of Reason (1952, original publication?)
- Paul Tillich, The Courage to Be (1952)
- C. S. Lewis, Mere Christianity (1952)
- Leo Strauss, Persecution and the Art of Writing (1952)
- Simone Weil, Gravity and Grace (1952)

== Births ==
- March 11 - Douglas Adams (died 2001)
- March 12 - André Comte-Sponville
- April 1 - Bernard Stiegler
- April 9 - Christine Korsgaard
- April 9 - Robert Zubrin
- April 15 - Avital Ronell
- August 8 - Jostein Gaarder
- October 27 - Francis Fukuyama
- Galen Strawson (unknown)
- Manuel de Landa (unknown)

== Deaths ==
- May 6 - Maria Montessori (born 1870)
- June 1 - John Dewey (born 1859)
- September 26 - George Santayana (born 1863)
- November 20 - Benedetto Croce (born 1866)
