= 1944 in archaeology =

List of years in archaeology	(table)
- … 1934; 1935; 1936; 1937; 1938; 1939; 1940; 1941; 1942; 1943; 1944; 1945; 1946; 1947; 1948; 1949; 1950; 1951; 1952; 1953; 1954 …
- In science 1941 1942 1943 1944 1945 1946 1947
- Art; Archaeology; Architecture; Literature; Music; Philosophy; Science; +...

Below are notable events in archaeology that occurred in 1944.

== Excavations ==
- August - Excavations in the bombed area of Canterbury, England, are begun.
- "Caesar's Camp" (pre-Roman) site at location of London Heathrow Airport.

== Publications ==
- Paul Jacobsthal's Early Celtic Art published in Oxford.

== Finds ==
- First find of 12th century Kilwa Sultanate copper coins on Marchinbar Island off the north coast of Australia.

== Events ==
- 31 May - Nemi ships destroyed by fire.
- The Council for British Archaeology is formed.
- Mortimer Wheeler is appointed Director-General of the Archaeological Survey of India.

== Births ==
- 1 March - Dai Morgan Evans, British archaeologist (d. 2017)
- 6 July - Timothy W. Potter, English archaeologist (d. 2000)
- 10 July - Norman Hammond, British Mayanist
- 15 July - Nigel Williams, British conservator (d. 1992)
- 25 July - David Breeze, British archaeologist notable for work on Hadrian's Wall, the Antonine Wall and the Roman Army
- 19 December - Richard Leakey, Kenyan palaeoanthropologist (d. 2022)
- Gabriel Barkay, Hungarian-born Israeli archaeologist
