= 1951 in paleontology =

List of years in paleontology	(table)
- … 1941; 1942; 1943; 1944; 1945; 1946; 1947; 1948; 1949; 1950; 1951; 1952; 1953; 1954; 1955; 1956; 1957; 1958; 1959; 1960; 1961 …
- In science 1948 1949 1950 1951 1952 1953 1954
- Art; Archaeology; Architecture; Literature; Music; Philosophy; Science; +...

Paleontology or palaeontology is the study of prehistoric life forms on Earth through the examination of plant and animal fossils. This includes the study of body fossils, tracks (ichnites), burrows, cast-off parts, fossilised feces (coprolites), palynomorphs and chemical residues. Because humans have encountered fossils for millennia, paleontology has a long history both before and after becoming formalized as a science. This article records significant discoveries and events related to paleontology that occurred or were published in the year 1951.

== Archosaurs ==
=== Newly named dinosaurs ===
Data courtesy of George Olshevsky's dinosaur genera list.

Name	Status	Authors	Age	Unit	Location	Notes	Images
Montanoceratops	Valid	Charles M. Sternberg	Late Cretaceous (Edmontonian)	St. Mary River Formation	Canada (Alberta); USA (Montana)	A leptoceratopsid.	Montanoceratops
Pachysuchus	Nomen dubium	Young	Early Jurassic (Hettangian-Sinemurian)	Lufeng Formation	China	A dubious basal sauropodomorph.	

== Synapsids ==
=== Non-mammalian ===
Name	Status	Authors	Age	Unit	Location	Notes	Images
Baurocynodon	Junior synonym	Brink	Late Permian	Dicynodon Assemblage Zone		A junior synonym of Nanictosaurus.	
Gomphodontoides	Jr. synonym	Brink and Kitching	Middle Triassic	Burgersdorp Formation		A junior synonym of Diademodon.	
Silphedocynodon	Junior synonym	Brink	Late Permian	Cistecephalus Assemblage Zone		A junior synonym of Procynosuchus.	
Walteria	Preoccupied	Brink and Kitching	Middle Permian	Tapinocephalus Assemblage Zone	South Africa	A junior homonym of Walteria Schulze, 1885; renamed Karroowalteria Kuhn, 1938	
