= 1950 in paleontology =

List of years in paleontology	(table)
- … 1940; 1941; 1942; 1943; 1944; 1945; 1946; 1947; 1948; 1949; 1950; 1951; 1952; 1953; 1954; 1955; 1956; 1957; 1958; 1959; 1960 …
- In science 1947 1948 1949 1950 1951 1952 1953
- Art; Archaeology; Architecture; Literature; Music; Philosophy; Science; +...

Paleontology or palaeontology is the study of prehistoric life forms on Earth through the examination of plant and animal fossils. This includes the study of body fossils, tracks (ichnites), burrows, cast-off parts, fossilised feces (coprolites), palynomorphs and chemical residues. Because humans have encountered fossils for millennia, paleontology has a long history both before and after becoming formalized as a science. This article records significant discoveries and events related to paleontology that occurred or were published in the year 1950.

== Dinosaurs ==
=== Newly named dinosaurs ===
Data courtesy of George Olshevsky's dinosaur genera list.

Name	Status	Authors		Age	Unit	Location	Notes	Images
Acrocanthosaurus	Valid taxon	Stovall	Langston	late Aptian-early Albian	Antlers Formation; Cloverly Formation; Twin Mountains Formation	United States (Maryland, Wyoming, Oklahoma, Texas)	A sail-backed carcharodontosaurid.	Acrocanthosaurus Pachyrhinosaurus canadensis
Pachyrhinosaurus	Valid taxon	C. M. Sternberg		Edmontonian	Horseshoe Canyon Formation	Canada (Alberta); United States (Alaska)	A centrosaurine.	Acrocanthosaurus Pachyrhinosaurus canadensis

== Plesiosaurs ==
- Plesiosaur gastroliths documented.

== Synapsids ==
=== Non-mammalian ===
Name	Status	Authors	Age	Unit	Location	Notes	Images
Kitchingia	Junior synonym	Broom and George	Late Permian	Cistecephalus Assemblage Zone	South Africa	A junior synonym of Rhachiocephalus.	
Leontosaurus	Junior synonym	Broom and George	Late Permian	Dicynodon Assemblage Zone	South Africa	A junior synonym of Sycosaurus.	
Silphoictidoides	Valid	Friedrich von Huene	Late Permian	Cistecephalus Assemblage Zone	Tanzania	A member of Gorgonopsia.	
Theropsodon	Valid	Friedrich von Huene	Middle Triassic	Cynognathus Assemblage Zone	Tanzania	A traversodontid.	
Tigrisaurus	Junior synonym	Broom and George	Late Permian	Cistecephalus Assemblage Zone	South Africa	A junior synonym of Dinogorgon.	
