= 1948 in paleontology =

List of years in paleontology	(table)
- … 1938; 1939; 1940; 1941; 1942; 1943; 1944; 1945; 1946; 1947; 1948; 1949; 1950; 1951; 1952; 1953; 1954; 1955; 1956; 1957; 1958 …
- In science 1945 1946 1947 1948 1949 1950 1951
- Art; Archaeology; Architecture; Literature; Music; Philosophy; Science; +...

Paleontology or palaeontology is the study of prehistoric life forms on Earth through the examination of plant and animal fossils. This includes the study of body fossils, tracks (ichnites), burrows, cast-off parts, fossilised feces (coprolites), palynomorphs and chemical residues. Because humans have encountered fossils for millennia, paleontology has a long history both before and after becoming formalized as a science. This article records significant discoveries and events related to paleontology that occurred or were published in the year 1948.

== Arthropods ==
=== Newly named insects ===
Name	Novelty	Status	Authors	Age	Unit	Location	Notes	Images
Metanephrocerus	Gen nov	valid	Aczél	Priabonian	Baltic Amber	Europe	A big-headed fly; new genus for Protonephrocerus collini	

== Archosauromorphs ==
=== Newly named dinosaurs ===
Data courtesy of George Olshevsky's dinosaur genera list.

Name	Status	Authors	Age	Unit	Location	Notes	Images
Lukousaurus	Valid taxon	Yang Zhongjian (as Young C. C.)	Early Jurassic (Hettangian-Sinemurian)	Lower Lufeng Series	China	May be a crocodylomorph rather than a theropod.	

== Pterosaurs ==
=== New taxa ===
Name	Status	Authors	Age	Unit	Location	Notes
Batrachognathus	Valid	Rjabinin	Late Jurassic (Oxfordian-Kimmeridgian)	Karabastau Svita	Kazakhstan	An anurognathid.

== Synapsids ==
=== Non-mammalian ===
Name	Status	Authors	Age	Unit	Location	Notes	Images
Clelandina	Valid	Broom	Late Permian	Cistecephalus Assemblage Zone; Dicynodon Assemblage Zone; Tropidostoma Assemblage Zone	South Africa	A gorgonopsid.	
Digalodon	Valid	Broom and Robinson	Late Permian	Cistecephalus Assemblage Zone	South Africa; Zambia	For a time considered a junior synonym, its validity was reinstated in 2015.	
Koupia	Valid	Boonstra	Middle Permian	Tapinocephalus Assemblage Zone	South Africa	A dicynodont.	
Pardocephalus	Junior synonym	Broom	Late Permian	Cistecephalus Assemblage Zone	South Africa	A junior synonym of the gorgonopsid Aelurognathus	
Robertia	Valid	Boonstra	Middle Permian	Tapinocephalus Assemblage Zone	South Africa	A pylaecephalid. Like Diictodon, it was also a burrower.	Robertia
Smilesaurus	Valid	Broom	Late Permian	Cistecephalus Assemblage Zone	South Africa	A junior synonym of the gorgonopsid Aelurognathus.	
Tetracynodon	Valid	Broom and Robinson	Late Permian-Early Triassic	Cistecephalus Assemblage Zone; Lystrosaurus Assemblage Zone	South Africa	A lycideopid therocephalian.	
