= 1954 in paleontology =

List of years in paleontology	(table)
- … 1944; 1945; 1946; 1947; 1948; 1949; 1950; 1951; 1952; 1953; 1954; 1955; 1956; 1957; 1958; 1959; 1960; 1961; 1962; 1963; 1964 …
- In science 1951 1952 1953 1954 1955 1956 1957
- Art; Archaeology; Architecture; Literature; Music; Philosophy; Science; +...

Paleontology or palaeontology is the study of prehistoric life forms on Earth through the examination of plant and animal fossils. This includes the study of body fossils, tracks (ichnites), burrows, cast-off parts, fossilised feces (coprolites), palynomorphs and chemical residues. Because humans have encountered fossils for millennia, paleontology has a long history both before and after becoming formalized as a science. This article records significant discoveries and events related to paleontology that occurred or were published in the year 1954.

== Plants ==
=== Angiosperms ===
Name	Novelty	Status	Authors	Age	Unit	Location	Notes	Images
Amyridoxylon	Gen et sp nov		Kruse	Early Eocene	Green River Formation	USA; Wyoming	A rutaceous petrified wood. The type species is A. ordinatum	
Aspidospermoxylon	Gen et sp nov		Kruse	Early Eocene	Green River Formation	USA; Wyoming	An apocynaceous petrified wood. The type species is A. uniseriatum	
Chandlera	Gen et sp nov	valid	Scott	Middle Eocene	Clarno Formation	USA; Oregon	A moon seed genus. Type species C. lacunosa.	
Edenoxylon	Gen et sp nov		Kruse	Early Eocene	Green River Formation	USA; Wyoming	An anacaridaceous petrified wood. The type species is E. parviareolatum	
Fagara biseriata	Sp nov		Kruse	Early Eocene	Green River Formation	USA; Wyoming	A rutaceous petrified wood.	
Fagara monophylloides	Sp nov		Kruse	Early Eocene	Green River Formation	USA; Wyoming	A rutaceous petrified wood.	
Forchhammerioxylon	Gen et sp nov		Kruse	Early Eocene	Green River Formation	USA; Wyoming	A resedaceous petrified wood. The type species is F. scleroticum	
Heveoxylon	Gen et sp nov		Kruse	Early Eocene	Green River Formation	USA; Wyoming	A euphorbiaceous petrified wood. The type species is H. microporosum	
Juglans clarnensis	Sp nov	valid	Scott	Middle Eocene	Clarno Formation	USA; Oregon	A walnut.	
Mastixioidiocarpum oregonense	Gen et sp nov	valid	Scott	Middle Eocene	Clarno Formation	USA; Oregon	A Tupelo relative	
Myrica scalariformis	Sp nov	jr synonym	Kruse	Early Eocene	Green River Formation	USA; Wyoming	An Eden Valley petrified wood. Moved to Morella scalariformis in 2021	
Odontocaryoidea	Gen et sp nov	valid	Scott	Middle Eocene	Clarno Formation	USA; Oregon	A moon seed genus. Type species O. nodulosa.	
Palaeonyssa spatulata	sp nov	jr synonym	Scott	Middle Eocene	Clarno Formation	USA	A Tupelo, moved to Nyssa spatulata in 1994	
Palaeophytocrene hancockii	Sp nov	valid	Scott	Middle Eocene	Clarno Formation	USA; Oregon	An icacinaceous species.	
Palaeophytocrene pseudopersica	Sp nov	valid	Scott	Middle Eocene	Clarno Formation	USA; Oregon	An icacinaceous species.	
Parthenocissus angustisulcata	Sp nov	valid	Scott	Middle Eocene	Clarno Formation	USA; Oregon	A vitaceous species	
Schinoxylon	Gen et sp nov		Kruse	Early Eocene	Green River Formation	USA; Wyoming	An anacaridaceous petrified wood. The type species is S. actinoporosum	
Suriana inordinata	Sp nov		Kruse	Early Eocene	Green River Formation	USA; Wyoming	A surianaceous petrified wood.	
Talauma multiperforata	Sp nov		Kruse	Early Eocene	Green River Formation	USA; Wyoming	An Eden Valley petrified wood.	
Trochodendroxylon beckii	Sp nov	valid	Hergert & Phinney	Middle Eocene	Clarno Formation	USA; Oregon	A Trochodendron wood species. Moved to Trochodendron beckii in 1982	

== Arthropods ==
=== Insects ===
Name	Novelty	Status	Authors	Age	Unit	Location	Notes	Images
Parastylotermes frazieri	Sp. nov	valid	Snyder	Miocene		USA	A Stylotermitid termite.	

== Archosauromorphs ==
=== Phytosaurs ===
Name	Status	Authors	Age	Unit	Location	Notes	Images
Coburgosuchus	Valid taxon	Heller	Late Triassic (Norian)	Burgsandstein Formation	Germany	A member of Pseudopalatinae.	

=== Dinosaurs ===
Data courtesy of George Olshevsky's dinosaur genera list.

Name	Status	Authors	Age	Unit	Location	Notes	Images
Mamenchisaurus	Valid taxon	Yang Zhongjian (as Young C. C.)	Late Jurassic (late Callovian-early Oxfordian)	Shangshaximiao Formation	China	A mamenchisaurid. The type species is M. constructus. This animal had a neck of more than 10 meters.	Mamenchisaurus
Rebbachisaurus	Valid taxon	René Lavocat	Middle Cretaceous (Albian-Cenomanian)	Kem Kem Beds	Morocco; Niger; Tunisia	A rebbachisaurid.	Rebbachisaurus
Therizinosaurus	Valid taxon	Evgeny Maleev	Late Cretaceous (late Campanian-early Maastrichtian)	Nemegt Formation	Mongolia	A therizinosaurid.	Therizinosaurus

== Synapsids ==
=== Pelycosaurs ===
Name	Status	Authors	Age	Location	Notes	Images
Phreatophasma	Valid	Ivan Yefremov	Middle Permian	Russia	A synapsid of uncertain affinities, perhaps a caseid.	

=== Eutherians ===
==== Cetaceans ====
Name	Status	Authors	Age	Unit	Location	Notes	Images
Leptodelphis	Valid	Kirpichnikov	Middle Miocene (Sarmatian)		Russia	A member of Kentriodontidae.	
Sarmatodelphis	Valid	Kirpichnikov	Middle Miocene (Sarmatian)		Moldova	A kentriodontid.	
