= 2009 in archaeology =

This page lists major events of 2009 in archaeology.

== Excavations ==
- February: Community excavation at Jacksdale in the Nottinghamshire coalfield of England.

== Finds ==
- January
  - The remains of a female mummy thought to be Queen Sesheshet are found in a recently discovered pyramid in Saqqara, Egypt.
  - Malaysian archaeologists report the discovery of seven stone axes possibly dating back 1.8 million years, which would make these the oldest stone axes known.
  - An archaeologist from the University of Pennsylvania reports the discovery of traces of a ritual dating back to 1200 BCE at Mount Lykaoin, in Greece.
  - Archaeologists in China report the discovery of the oldest cave-houses known. The houses were discovered near Xi'an, date back some 5,500 years and were created by the Yangshao culture.
  - A study published in the Journal of Archaeological Science claims the discovery of the oldest human hairs in coprolites found in South Africa. The hairs are between 195.000 and 257.000 years old.
- February
  - Over 20 mummies are discovered at Saqqara, in Egypt. The tomb is remarkably intact, and dates to the 7th century BCE.
  - New finds at an Indus Valley civilization site in Pakistan, dated to about 4000 years ago through radiocarbon dating done at the Dutch University of Groningen, link the site to the city of Mohenjo-daro. The finds seem to indicate that Mohenjo-Daro flourished longer than previously thought.
  - Archaeologists in Mexico City report the late 2008 discovery of an Aztec mass grave dating to the Spanish conquest of the Aztec Empire. The site, Tlatelolco, is unusual because the grave seems to have been dug by Aztecs, acting on the orders of Europeans.
  - British archaeologists report the discovery of one of the oldest watermills known in the country. The mill, dating to the late 12th century, is located along the Thames.
  - Researchers announce the discovery of a large amount of fossils near the La Brea Tar Pits in the city of Los Angeles, California, United States. Among the finds is a mammoth skeleton, much more complete than earlier mammoths encountered at the pits.
  - Previously unpublished fragments of the Turin King List are discovered in the basement of the Museo Egizio in Turin, Italy. The fragments may shed more light on the history of Ancient Egypt. A new, more complete, publication of the papyrus is expected.
- March
  - A Belgian expedition reports the rediscovery of an Egyptian tomb dating to the 18th dynasty. The tomb belongs to a high-ranking official in the court of the powerful Pharaoh Thutmose III. While previously discovered in 1880, the site was subsequently lost under the sand.
  - The discovery of a royal tomb at Saqqara, Egypt is announced by a Japanese team of archaeologists. The grave is suspected to have belonged to Isisnofret, the granddaughter of Pharaoh Ramesses II of the nineteenth dynasty of Egypt.
  - While searching for debris caused by Hurricane Ike, contractors using sonar discover the shipwreck of what is believed to be the Carolina in the Gulf of Mexico. The ship sank in 1864.
  - Odyssey Marine Exploration announce discovery of the wreck of RMS Laconia (1911) (torpedoed 1917) 6 mi (9.7 km) northwest of Fastnet Rock.
- 19 March: A 4th century early Christian tomb has been discovered during works for a sewage system in località Trentola, Marcianise.
- June
  - Archaeologists in Groningen, the Netherlands, unearth c. 400 silver coins from the early 16th century. The discovery is one of the largest coin treasures ever found in the Netherlands.
  - Archaeologists in the Dutch city of Utrecht discover a 17-meters long Roman wall under the square in front of the Dom Tower of Utrecht. It is the largest extant wall of a castellum discovered in the Netherlands.
  - The Dutch Minister of Education, Culture and Science, Ronald Plasterk, unveils "Krijn". This is the first Neanderthal fossil discovered in the Netherlands. The find was made in the North Sea and announced at the Dutch National Museum of Antiquities. The discovery prompted numerous scientists and institutions to express hope for better government protection of archaeological remains in the North Sea.
  - Ridgeway Hill Viking burial pit a suspected massacre, was discovered near Weymouth, Dorset during road construction works.
- 9 June: Archaeologists announce that they have discovered a Neolithic burial complex at Damerham in the south of England.
- 5 July: In England, metal detectorist Terry Herbert discovers the Staffordshire Hoard, the largest hoard of Anglo-Saxon gold yet found.
- August: In England, a metal detectorist discovers the Shrewsbury Hoard, a hoard of about 10,000 Roman coins.
- 11 August: Archaeologists announce that they have discovered a royal tomb from the early Bronze Age at Forteviot in Scotland.
- 14 August: Archaeologists announce that they have discovered a Neolithic temple in the Heart of Neolithic Orkney World Heritage Site.
- 29 September: In Scotland, a metal detectorist discovers the Stirling torcs.
- 17 December: Archaeologists announce that they have found man-made structures on the sea-bed off the island of Damsay, Orkney.
- 20 December: Discovery of AHS Centaur off Queensland is announced.
- 29 December: Archaeologists announce the discovery of the Cao Cao Mausoleum in Anyang, Henan.
- Late: A wreck, perhaps from the Spanish Armada, is found off Rutland Island, County Donegal.
- Undated
  - Swedish Maritime Administration side-scan sonar in the Baltic Sea locates a wreck, identified in 2019 as belonging to a date around 1500.
  - Bronze Age hoard found on St Michael's Mount, Cornwall (England).

== Events ==
- January: A new analysis of old excavation reports, combined with newly done fieldwork, leads researches to conclude that the Sassanid Persian besiegers used poison gas against the Roman defenders during the Fall of Dura Europos. The gas, made by adding sulfur crystals and bitumen to prepared fires, was used in tunnels undermining the walls. Almost two dozen Roman soldiers were killed.
- February: Egypt renews its request for the return of the famous bust of Nefertiti from the Egyptian Museum of Berlin in Germany, after an article by Der Spiegel reports that German archaeologists deceived Egyptians about the worth of the piece after its initial discovery.
- February: Bulgarian archaeologists report that looters have plundered a partially excavated Roman site near Rousse.
- February: Experimental archaeology on replicas of the cannons found on a sunken Elizabethan warship indicate that the British employed revolutionary naval tactics at the time, explaining the rise of British marine power during the 16th century.
- February: An auction at Christie's in Paris, France, makes a record-breaking 370 million euros (US$490 million). The auction sells of the private collection of Yves Saint Laurent and Pierre Bergé, which includes Greek and Roman sculptures. The selling of two Chinese bronze zodiac heads is controversial. They were looted in the 19th century from the Old Summer Palace, prompting China to demand restitution.
- 20 June: The Acropolis Museum in Athens is officially opened.
- July: The University of Manchester Archaeology Unit is closed

== Publications ==
- January: A publication in the Proceedings of the National Academy of Sciences finds no evidence of a single event causing many simultaneous fires throughout North America nearly 13,000 years ago, contradicting the theory that a comet explosion may have caused the Quaternary extinction event.
- February: The Max Planck Institute for Evolutionary Anthropology in Germany publishes the first draft of the Neanderthal genome, covering 63% of the 3.2 billion base pairs.
- February: A publication in Science discusses the results from a study into over a dozen early hominid footprints, discovered over the last couple of years in Kenya. The prints date back 1.5 million years and were most likely produced by several individuals of the species Homo erectus. The results confirm that hominids evolved a modern walking gait even before Homo sapiens existed.
- March: British archaeologists publishing in Science lay out new evidence confirming that the Botai culture in prehistoric Kazakhstan may have been the first to domesticate horses, during the 4th millennium BC.
- March: At a conference in Rome, scientists report that a new analysis of frescoes in the Basilica of San Francesco d'Assisi reveals that they were covered in cow's milk. The milk was used as a binder for the paint. The fragments were analyzed as part of a restoration project, after a 1997 earthquake caused part of the vault to collapse.
- Mark S. Anderson – Marothodi: the historical archaeology of an African capital (Atikkam).
- Ann Garrison Darrin and Beth Laura O'Leary – Handbook of space engineering, archaeology and heritage.
- Vincent Gaffney, Simon Fitch and David Smith – Europe’s Lost World: the Rediscovery of Doggerland (Council for British Archaeology).

== Deaths ==
- 11 February – Khaled Nashef, Palestinian archaeologist (b. 1942)
- 23 February – Alan Vince, British archaeologist (b. 1952)
- 16 August – Mualla Eyüboğlu, Turkish restoration architect (b. 1919)
