= 1958 in paleontology =

List of years in paleontology	(table)
- … 1948; 1949; 1950; 1951; 1952; 1953; 1954; 1955; 1956; 1957; 1958; 1959; 1960; 1961; 1962; 1963; 1964; 1965; 1966; 1967; 1968 …
- In science 1955 1956 1957 1958 1959 1960 1961
- Art; Archaeology; Architecture; Literature; Music; Philosophy; Science; +...

Paleontology or palaeontology is the study of prehistoric life forms on Earth through the examination of plant and animal fossils. This includes the study of body fossils, tracks (ichnites), burrows, cast-off parts, fossilised feces (coprolites), palynomorphs and chemical residues. Because humans have encountered fossils for millennia, paleontology has a long history both before and after becoming formalized as a science. This article records significant discoveries and events related to paleontology that occurred or were published in the year 1958.

== Arthropods ==
=== Insects ===
Name	Novelty	Status	Authors	Age	Unit	Location	Notes	Images
Parastylotermes calico	Sp. nov	valid	Pierce	Miocene		USA	A Stylotermitid termite.	

== Archosauromorphs ==
=== Dinosaurs ===
Name	Novelty	Status	Authors	Age	Type locality	Location	Notes	Images
Chingkankousaurus fragilis	Gen et sp nov	Nomen dubium	Yang	Campanian	Jingangkou Formation	China	A tyrannosauroid	
Tanius chingkankouensis	Sp. nov.	Valid?	Yang	Campanian	Jingangkou Formation	China	A species of Tanius	
Tsintaosaurus spinorhinus	Gen. et sp. nov.	Valid	Yang	Campanian	Jingangkou Formation	China	A hadrosaurid	

=== Birds ===
==== Newly named birds ====
Name	Novelty	Status	Authors	Age	Unit	Location	Notes	Images
Anas apscheronica	Sp. nov.	valid	Burchak-Abramovisch	Late Pliocene	Apscherion	Azerbaijan	An Anatidae.	
Bartramia umatilla	Sp. nov.	valid	Brodkorb	Middle Pliocene		USA Oregon	A Scolopacidae.	
Callipepla shotwelli	Sp. nov.	valid	Brodkorb	Middle Pliocene		USA Oregon	An Odontophoridae.	
Cygnus hibbardi	Sp. nov.	valid	Brodkorb	Early Pleistocene	Irvingtonian, Hagerman Lake Beds	USA Idaho	An Anatidae.	
Morus humeralis	Sp. nov.	valid	Miller Bowman	Late Pliocene		USA California	A Sulidae.	
Ornimegalonyx	Gen. et Sp. nov.	valid	Arredondo	Late Pleistocene		Cuba	A Strigidae, the types species of the new genus is Ornimegalonyx oteroi.	
Pardirallus lacustris	Sp. nov.	valid	(Brodkorb)	Late Pliocene-Early Pleistocene	Hagerman and Rexroad Local Fauna	USA Idaho	A Rallidae, described as Porzana lacustris but transferred by Storrs L. Olson in 1977 to Pardirallus Bonaparte, 1856.	
Phalacrocorax macer	Sp. nov.	valid	Brodkorb	Late Pliocene	Irvingtonian, Glenns Ferry Formation, Hagerman Lake Beds	USA Idaho	A Phalacrocoracidae.	
Podiceps subparvus	Sp. nov.	valid	(Miller Bowman)	Middle Pliocene	Blancan, San Diego Formation	USA California	A Podicipedidae, described as Colymbus subparvus.	
Promilio epileus	Sp. nov.	valid	Wetmore	Early Miocene	Thomas Farm Beds	USA Florida	An Accipitridae, the type species of the genus is Proictinia effera Wetmore, 1923.	
Promilio brodkorbi	Sp. nov.	valid	Wetmore	Early Miocene	Thomas Farm Beds	USA Florida	An Accipitridae, the type species of the genus is Proictinia effera Wetmore, 1923.	
Ptychoramphus tenuis	Sp. nov.	valid	Miller Bowman	Middle Pliocene	Blancan, San Diego Formation	USA California	An Alcidae.	
Querandiornis	Gen. et Sp. nov.	valid	Rusconi	Late Pliocene	Ensenada Formation	Argentina	A Furnariidae, Dendrocolaptinae, The type species is Querandiornis romani, described in the Tinamiidae, transferred by Tonni & Tambussi, 1986 to Aves Incertae Sedis, transferred by Agnolin, 2016 to Dendrocolaptinae	
Sula pohli	Sp. nov.	valid	Howard	Late Miocene		USA California	A Sulidae.	
Troglodytes gracilis	Sp. nov.	valid?	Brunner	Late Pleistocene		Germany	A Troglodytidae, better seen as a Passeriformes Incertae Sedis.	

== Synapsids ==
=== Non-mammalian ===
Name	Status	Authors	Age	Unit	Location	Notes	Images
Basicranodon	Junior synonym	Vaughn	Early Permian		US	A junior synonym of the varanopid Mycterosaurus.	
Diarthrognathus	Valid	Crompton	Early Jurassic	Elliot Formation	South Africa	A member of Trithelodontidae.	

== Other Animals ==
Name	Novelty	Status	Authors	Age	Unit	Location	Notes	Images
Charnia	Gen. et sp. nov.	Valid	Ford	Ediacaran	Maplewell Group	United Kingdom	The type species is C. masoni.	
Charniodiscus	Gen. et sp. nov.	Valid	Ford	Ediacaran	Maplewell Group	United Kingdom	The type species is C. concentricus.	
Parvancorina	Gen. et sp. nov.	Valid	Glaessner	Ediacaran		Australia	The type species is P. minchami.	
Spriggina	Gen. et sp. nov.	Valid	Glaessner	Ediacaran		Australia	The type species is S. floundersi.	
