= 2017 in archaeology =

This page lists major archaeological events of 2017.

== Excavations ==
- May 6–7 – One of the biggest archaeology excavations in Leicester, England is opened to the public over two days. The excavation, overseen by University of Leicester Archaeological Services, has uncovered two large Roman mosaics and two Roman streets.
- Summer – First season of rescue excavation of wreck of French-built English ship HMS Invincible (1747) in The Solent.
- October – Site of Reno nightclub (closed 1986) in Manchester, England.
- Autumn – Site of Norman motte-and-bailey castle on Mount Stewart estate in Northern Ireland cleared.

== Finds ==
- February – A cave which once held Dead Sea Scrolls is found in the Judean desert by archaeologists from the Hebrew University of Jerusalem. The scrolls are believed to have been looted in the 1950s.
- March – Archaeologists from Haifa University discover the wreck of a 13th-century crusader ship and its cargo in Acre, Israel.
- March 7 – An ancient Egyptian statue of what is initially thought to be Ramesses II is found in groundwater in Cairo by archaeologists from Egypt and Germany. The statue is subsequently believed to be of Psamtik I based on inscriptions on the base of the statue.
- March 23 – Announcement of discovery of a medieval Jewish cemetery in Rome.
- April – Announcement of the earlier accidental discovery at St Mary-at-Lambeth church in London of a vault containing the tombs of five Archbishops of Canterbury dating back to 1610 during refurbishment as a museum.
- May 23 – Discovery of the wrecks of SS Ohio (1875) and SS Choctaw in Lake Huron.
- May 31 – Announcement of two Roman town houses, thought to date from the 3rd or 4th century, found under Priory Park, Chichester in England. One of the town houses includes a hot room and baths.
- June – Archaeologists uncover a city dating back to the 10th century as well as a 12th-century mosque in Eastern Ethiopia.
- Summer – Roman boxing gloves found at Vindolanda in the north of England.
- August
  - Boxford Roman mosaic discovered in southern England.
  - Benjamin Leigh Smith's Arctic research vessel Eira, crushed in ice off Northbrook Island in 1881, is located.
- August 19 – Heavy cruiser USS Indianapolis (launched 1931; sunk 1945) is located in the Philippine Sea.
- August 24 – A 6th century mosaic with Greek inscriptions dated from the rule of Justinian I is discovered while installing communication cables in Jerusalem's Old City.
- September – Announcement of discovery of two Roman swords and a toy wooden sword in the domestic quarters of Vindolanda, suggesting a hasty departure from the site.
- October 5 – Announcement of presumed location of wreck of ocean liner SS Athenia, the first British civilian casualty of World War II, on Rockall Bank.
- November 3 – Archaeologists announce the discovery of a 1400 year-old Byzantine sarcophagus with Greek inscriptions on the cover saying "Blessed Kandes sleeps here" in the antique village of Sadak in Satala in Turkey.
- November 17 – Three Roman-era shipwrecks found off the coast of Alexandria carry a Roman head carving possibly belong to a commander called "Antonio", and three gold coins dating back to the Emperor Octavius.
- November 23 – Israeli archaeologists report the discovery of a four-line Greek mosaic inscription at Ashdod, suggesting a Georgian origin on account of its dating to "the 3rd indiction, year 292", which corresponds to AD 539 according to a medieval Christian Georgian calendar.
- November 29 – Archaeologists interpret defensive works at Ebbsfleet, Thanet, as evidence of Caesar's invasion of Britain at Pegwell Bay in 54BC.
- December 18 – Announcement of discovery of artefacts from the 18th century Clapham's coffeehouse in Cambridge, England.
- December 21 – Announcement of discovery of the 1914 wreck of the Royal Australian Navy's first submarine, the British-built HMAS AE1, the first Allied submarine lost in World War I, off Duke of York Islands in Papua New Guinea.
- Discovery of early paintings of animals, Celebes warty pigs and anoas (dwarf buffalo), being pursued by human-like figures from (probably) at least 44,000 years BP, in a cave in South Sulawesi (Indonesia) located by an Australian-led team.
- A skeleton is excavated near Fenstanton in eastern England which is subsequently identified as a Roman slave victim of crucifixion.
- A Fairey Swordfish aircraft, crashed during World War II, is found off Malta.

== Events ==
- January 20 – A tetrapylon monument is destroyed and part of a Roman amphitheatre damaged by ISIS in Palmyra.
- The Pylos Combat Agate from Griffin Warrior Tomb, excavated in 2015, is cleaned.
- DNA analysis of the skeleton of the Birka female Viking warrior excavated on the Swedish island of Björkö in 1878 (and then believed to be male) confirms her sex.

== Deaths ==
- January 24 – Peter Woodman, Irish archaeologist (b. 1943)
- February 4 – Ivor Noël Hume, British-born historical archaeologist (b. 1927)
- March 1 – Dai Morgan Evans, British archaeologist (b. 1944)
- June 27 – Bridget Allchin, British archaeologist and prehistorian (b. 1927)
- June 29 – Antonio Sagona, Australian archaeologist (b. 1956)
- September 7 – Elizabeth Fowler, British medieval archaeologist (b. 1933)

== See also ==
- List of years in archaeology
