= 1869 in archaeology =

Below are notable events in archaeology that occurred in 1869.

== Excavations ==
- Near Miamisburg, Ohio, the site of Miamisburg Mound is partially excavated, when a vertical shaft is sunk from the top to the base, with two horizontal tunnels extending from it.
- December 31 - Temple of Artemis at Ephesus discovered by British archaeologist John Turtle Wood near Kuşadası, Turkey.

== Finds ==
- October 18 - Waldalgesheim chariot burial first discovered in the Rhineland.
- November 29 - Opening of a 4th-century Roman Oxfordshire limestone sarcophagus reused in the 11th century for the Christian burial of a high-status figure (probably an abbot) and unearthed in the grounds of Westminster Abbey in London (previously found in 1820).

== Births ==
- March 30 - Aleš Hrdlička, Czech-born anthropologist (d. 1943)
- April 23 - Percy Newberry, English archaeologist (d. 1949)
- April 30 - John Kirk, English physician, Roman archaeologist and physical anthropologist (d. 1940)
- July 3 - John Myres, English archaeologist of Cyprus (d. 1954)
- September 24 - Maud Cunnington, British archaeologist (d. 1951)

== Deaths ==
- August 8 - Roger Fenton, English photographer (b. 1819)

== See also ==
- Egyptology
