= Theropsodon =

Theropsodon Temporal range: Middle Triassic

Scientific classification
- Domain: Eukaryota
- Kingdom: Animalia
- Phylum: Chordata
- Clade: Synapsida
- Clade: Therapsida
- Clade: Cynodontia
- Family: †Traversodontidae
- Genus: †Theropsodon von Huene, 1950

Species
- †T. njalilirs von Huene, 1950 (type)

Extinct genus of cynodonts

Theropsodon is an extinct genus of traversodontid cynodonts from the Middle Triassic of Tanzania. Fossils have been found from the Manda Formation. A single holotype skull of the type species T. njaliliris was named by German paleontologist Friedrich von Huene in 1950.
