= Carolina (ship) =

American Civil War Merchant ship that sanked in 1864 in the Gulf of Mexico

Carolina, also known as Caroline, was an American Civil War merchant ship that tried to leave Galveston, Texas by breaking through a federal blockade. The ship sank in 1864 while carrying cotton in the Gulf of Mexico. On March 9, 2009, contractors looking for debris from Hurricane Ike reported the discovery of the shipwreck after using sonar.
