= Power: A New Social Analysis =

1938 book by Bertrand Russell

- Cover of the first edition
- Author: Bertrand Russell
- Language: English
- Subject: Social philosophy
- Publisher: Allen & Unwin
- Publication date: 1938
- Publication place: United Kingdom
- Media type: Print (Hardcover and Paperback)
- Pages: 328

Power: A New Social Analysis by Bertrand Russell (1st imp. London 1938, Allen & Unwin, 328 pp.) is a work in social philosophy written by Bertrand Russell. Power, for Russell, is one's ability to achieve goals. In particular, Russell has in mind social power, that is, power over people.

The volume contains a number of arguments. However, four themes have a central role in the overall work. The first theme given treatment in the analysis is that the lust for power is a part of human nature. Second, the work emphasises that there are different forms of social power, and that these forms are substantially interrelated. Third, Power insists that "organisations are usually connected with certain kinds of individuals". Finally, the work ends by arguing that "arbitrary rulership can and should be subdued".

Throughout the work, Russell's ambition is to develop a new method of conceiving the social sciences as a whole. For him, all topics in the social sciences are merely examinations of the different forms of power – chiefly the economic, military, cultural, and civil forms . Eventually, he hoped that social science would be robust enough to capture the "laws of social dynamics", which would describe how and when one form of power changes into another. As a secondary goal of the work, Russell is at pains to reject single-cause accounts of social power, such as the economic determinism he attributes to Karl Marx.

== The Content ==
The new social analysis examines at least four general topics: the nature of power, the forms of power, the structure of organisations, and the ethics of power.

=== Nature of power ===
Russell's view of human nature, like that of Thomas Hobbes, is somewhat pessimistic. By Russell's account, the desire to empower oneself is unique to human nature. No other animals besides Homo sapiens, he argues, are capable of being so unsatisfied with their lot, that they should try to accumulate more goods than meet their needs. The "impulse to power", as he calls it, does not arise unless one's basic desires have been sated. Then the imagination stirs, motivating the actor to gain more power. In Russell's view, the love of power is nearly universal among people, although it takes on different guises from person to person. A person with great ambitions may become the next Caesar, but others may be content to merely dominate the home.

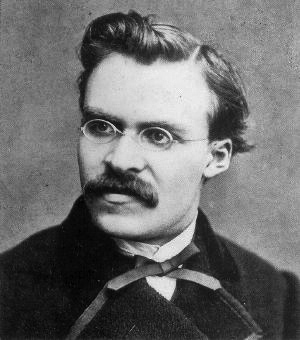
Nietzsche's philosophy was one of Russell's targets

This impulse to power is not only "explicitly" present in leaders, but also sometimes "implicitly" in those who follow. It is clear that leaders may pursue and profit from enacting their own agenda, but in a "genuinely cooperative enterprise", the followers seem to gain vicariously from the achievements of the leader.

In stressing this point, Russell is explicitly rebutting Friedrich Nietzsche's infamous "master-slave morality" argument. Russell explains:

"Most men do not feel in themselves the competence required for leading their group to victory, and therefore seek out a captain who appears to possess the courage and sagacity necessary for the achievement of supremacy... Nietzsche accused Christianity of inculcating a slave-morality, but ultimate triumph was always the goal. 'Blessed are the meek, for they shall inherit the earth. '".

The existence of implicit power, he explains, is why people are capable of tolerating social inequality for an extended period of time.

However, Russell is quick to note that the invocation of human nature should not come at the cost of ignoring the exceptional personal temperaments of power-seekers. Following Adler (1927) – and to an extent echoing Nietzsche – he separates individuals into two classes: those who are imperious in a particular situation, and those who are not. The love of power, Russell tells us, is probably not motivated by Freudian complexes, (i.e., resentment of one's father, lust for one's mother, drives towards Eros and Thanatos (Love and Death drives, which constitute the basis of all human drives, etc.,) but rather by a sense of entitlement which arises from exceptional and deep-rooted self-confidence.

The imperious person is successful due to both mental and social factors. For instance, the imperious tend to have an internal confidence in their own competence and decisiveness which is relatively lacking in those who follow. In reality, the imperious may or may not actually be possessed of genuine skill; rather, the source of their power may also arise out of their hereditary or religious role.

"I greatly doubt whether the men who become pirate chiefs are those who are filled with retrospective terror of their fathers, or whether Napoleon, at Austerlitz, really felt that he was getting even with Madame Mère. I know nothing of the mother of Attila, but I rather suspect that she spoilt the little darling, who subsequently found the world irritating because it sometimes resisted his whims."
Bertrand Russell (1938:11)

Non-imperious persons include those who submit to a ruler, and those who withdraw entirely from the situation. A confident and competent candidate for leadership may withdraw from a situation when they lack the courage to challenge a particular authority, are timid by temperament, simply do not have the means to acquire power by the usual methods, are entirely indifferent to matters of power, and/or are moderated by a well-developed sense of duty.

Accordingly, while the imperious orator will tend to prefer a passionate crowd over a sympathetic one, the timid orator (or subject) will have the opposite preferences. The imperious orator is interested mostly in a mob that is more given to rash emotion than to reflection. The orator will try to engineer two 'layers' of belief in his crowd: "a superficial layer, in which the power of the enemy is magnified so as to make great courage seem necessary, and a deeper layer, in which there is a firm conviction of victory". By contrast, the timid will seek a sense of belonging, and "the reassurance which is felt in being one of a crowd who all feel alike".

When any given person has a crisis in confidence, and is placed in a terrifying situation, they will tend to behave in a predictable way: first, they submit to the rule of those who seem to have greater competence in the most relevant task, and second, they will surround themselves with that mass of persons who share a similarly low level of confidence. Thus, people submit to the rule of the leader in a kind of emergency solidarity.

=== Forms of power ===
To begin with, Russell is interested in classifying the different ways in which one human being may have power over another – what he calls the "forms of power". The forms may be subdivided into two: influence over persons, and the psychological types of influence.

To understand how organisations operate, Russell explains, we must first understand the basic methods by which they can exercise power at all – that is, we must understand the manner in which individuals are persuaded to follow some authority. Russell breaks the forms of influence down into three very general categories: "the power of force and coercion"; the "power of inducements", such as operant conditioning and group conformity; and "the power of propaganda and/or habit" .

To explain each form, Russell provides illustrations. The power of mere force is like the tying of a rope around a pig's belly and lifting it up to a ship while ignoring its cries. The power of inducements is likened to two things: either conditioning, as exemplified by circus animals which have been trained to perform this-or-that trick for an audience, or group acquiescence, as when the leader among sheep is dragged along by chains to get the rest of the flock to follow. Finally, the power of propaganda is akin to the use of carrot and stick to influence the behaviour of a donkey, in the sense that the donkey is being persuaded that making certain actions (following the carrot, avoiding the stick) would be more or less to their benefit.

Russell makes a distinction between traditional, revolutionary, and naked forms of psychological influence. These psychological types overlap with the forms of influence in some respects: for instance, "naked power" can be reduced to coercion alone. But the other types are distinct units of analysis, and require separate treatments.

==== Naked and economic power ====
When force is used in the absence of other forms, it is called "naked power". In other words, naked power is the ruthless exertion of force without the desire for, or attempt at, consent. In all cases, the sources of naked power are the fears of the powerless and the ambitions of the powerful. As an example of naked power, Russell recalls the story of Agathocles, the son of a potter who became the tyrant of Syracuse.

Russell argues that naked power arises within a government under certain social conditions: when two or more fanatical creeds are contending for governance, and when all traditional beliefs have decayed. A period of naked power may end by foreign conquest, the creation of stability, and/or the rise of a new religion.

The process by which an organisation achieves sufficient prominence that it is able to exercise naked power can be described as the rule of three phases. According to this rule, what begins as fanaticism on the part of some crowd eventually produces conquest by means of naked power. Eventually, the acquiescence of the outlying population transforms naked power into traditional power. Finally, once a traditional power has taken hold, it engages in the suppression of dissent by the use of naked power.

For Russell, economic power is parallel to the power of conditioning. However, unlike Marx, he emphasises that economic power is not primary, but rather, derives from a combination of the forms of power. By his account, economics is dependent largely upon the functioning of law, and especially, property law; and law is to a large degree a function of the power over opinion, which cannot be entirely explained by wage, labour, and trade.

Ultimately, Russell argues that economic power is attained through the ability to defend one's territory (and to conquer other lands), to possess the materials for the cultivation of one's resources, and to be able to satisfy the demands of others on the market.

==== The power of (and over) opinion ====
In Russell's model, power over the creeds and habits of persons is easy to miscalculate. He claims that, on the one hand, the economic determinists had underestimated the power of opinion. However, on the other hand, he argues that the case is easy to make that all power is power over opinion: for "Armies are useless unless the soldiers believe in the cause for which they are fighting... Law is impotent unless it is generally respected." Still, he admits that military force may cause opinion, and (with few exceptions) be the thing that imbues opinion with power in the first place:

"We thus have a kind of see-saw: first, pure persuasion leading to the conversion of a minority; then force exerted to secure that the rest of the community shall be exposed to the right propaganda; and finally a genuine belief on the part of the great majority, which makes the use of force again unnecessary."

"It is not altogether true that persuasion is one thing and force is another. Many forms of persuasion—even many of which everybody approves-- are really a kind of force. Consider what we do to our children. We do not say to them: 'Some people think the earth is round, and others think it is flat; when you grow up, you can, if you like, examine the evidence and form your own conclusion.' Instead of this we say: 'The earth is round.' By the time our children are old enough to examine the evidence, our propaganda has closed their minds..."
Bertrand Russell (1938:221)

Thus, although "the power over opinion" may occur with or without force, the power of a creed arises only after a powerful and persuasive minority has willingly adopted the creed.

The exception here is the case of Western science, which seemingly rose in cultural appeal despite being unpopular with establishment forces. Russell explains the popularity of science is not grounded on a general respect for reason, but rather is grounded entirely on the fact that science produces technology, and technology produces things that people desire. Similarly, religion, advertising, and propaganda all have power because of their connections with the desires of their audiences. Russell's conclusion is that reason has very limited, though specific, sway over the opinions of persons. For reason is only effective when it appeals to desire.

Russell then inquires into the power that reason has over a community, as contrasted with fanaticism. It would seem that the power of reason is that it is able to increase the odds of success in practical matters by way of technical efficiency. The cost of allowing for reasoned inquiry is the tolerance of intellectual disagreement, which in turn provokes scepticism and dims the power of fanaticism. Conversely, it would seem that a community is stronger and more cohesive if there is widespread agreement within it over certain creeds, and reasoned debate is rare. If these two opposing conditions are both to be fully exploited for short-term gains, then it would demand two things: first, that some creed be held both by the majority opinion (through force and propaganda), and second, that the majority of intellectual class concurs (through reasoned discussion). In the long-term, however, creeds tend to provoke weariness, light scepticism, outright disbelief, and finally, apathy.

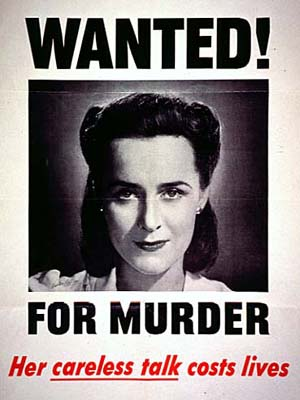
An example of war-time propaganda

Russell is acutely aware that power tends to coalesce in the hands of a minority, and no less so when it comes to power over opinion. The result is "systematic propaganda", or the monopoly over propaganda by the state. Perhaps surprisingly, Russell avers that the consequences of systematic propaganda are not as dire as one might expect. A true monopoly over opinion leads to careless arrogance among leaders, as well as to indifference to the well-being of the governed, and a lack of credulity on behalf of the governed towards the state. In the long-term, the net result is:

"[to] delay revolution, but to make it more violent when it comes. When only one doctrine is officially allowed, men get no practice in thinking or in weighing alternatives; only a great wave of passionate revolt can dethrone orthodoxy; and in order to make the opposition sufficiently whole-hearted and violent to achieve success, it will seem necessary to deny even what was true in governmental dogma".

By contrast, the shrewd propagandist of the contemporary state will allow for disagreement, so that false established opinions will have something to react to. In Russell's words: "Lies need competition if they are to retain their vigour."

==== Revolutionary versus traditional power ====
Among the psychological types of influence, we have a distinction between "traditional, naked, and revolutionary power". (Naked power, as noted earlier, is the use of coercion without any pretense to legitimacy.)

By "traditional power", Russell has in mind the ways in which people will appeal to the force of habit to justify a political regime. It is in this sense that traditional power is psychological and not historical; since traditional power is not entirely based on a commitment to some linear historical creed, but rather, on mere habit. Moreover, traditional power need not be based on actual history, but rather be based on imagined or fabricated history. Thus he writes that "Both religious and secular innovators – at any rate those who have had most lasting success – have appealed, as far as they could, to tradition, and have done whatever lay in their power to minimise the elements of novelty in their system."

The two clearest examples of traditional power are the cases of "kingly power" and "priestly power". Russell traces both back historically to certain roles which served some function in early societies. The priest is akin to the medicine man of a tribe, who is thought to have unique powers of cursing and healing at their disposal. In most contemporary cases, priests rely on religious social movements grounded in charismatic authority, which have been more effective at usurping power than those religions that lack iconic founders. The history of the king is more difficult to examine, and the researcher can only speculate on their origins. At the very least, the power of kingship seems to be advanced by war, even if warmaking was not the king's original function.

When the forms of traditional power come to an end, there tends to be a corresponding change in creeds. If the traditional creeds are doubted without any alternative, then the traditional authority relies more and more on the use of naked power. And where the traditional creeds are wholly replaced with alternative ones, traditional power gives rise to revolutionary power.

"Revolutionary power" contrasts with traditional power in that it appeals to popular assent to some creed, and not merely popular acquiescence or habit. Thus, for the revolutionary, power is a means to an end, and the end is some creed or other. Whatever its intentions, the power of the revolutionary tends to either devolve back into naked power over time, or else to transform into traditional power.

The revolutionary faces at least two special problems. First, the transformation back into naked power occurs when revolutionary power has been around for a long period without achieving a resolution to its key conflict. At some point, the original goal of the creed tends to be forgotten, and consequently, the fanatics of the movement change their goals and aspire toward mere domination. Second, the revolutionary must always deal with the threat of counter-revolutionaries, and is hence faced with a dilemma: because revolutionary power must by definition think that the original revolution was justified, it "cannot, logically, contend that all subsequent revolutions must be wicked".

A transition into traditional power is also possible. Just as there are two kinds of traditional power – the priestly and the kingly – there are two kinds of revolutionary power, namely, the "soldier of fortune" and "the divine conqueror". Russell classes Benito Mussolini and Napoleon Bonaparte as soldiers of fortune, and Adolf Hitler, Oliver Cromwell, and Vladimir Lenin as divine conquerors. Nonetheless, the traditional forms bear only an imperfect relationship, if any, to the revolutionary forms.

=== Structure of organisations ===
Having introduced the reader to the forms of power, Russell applies those forms to a selection of organisations. The purpose of discussing organisations is that they seem to be one of the most common sources of social power. By an "organization", Russell means a set of people who share some activities, and directed at common goals, which is typified by a redistribution of power. Organizations differ in size and type, though common to them all is the tendency for inequality of power to increase as membership increases.

An exhaustive list of the types of organisation would be impossible, since the list would be as long as a list of human reasons to organise themselves in groups. However, Russell takes interest in only a small sample of organisations. The army and police, economic organisations, educational organisations, organisations of law, political parties, and churches are all recognised as societal entities.

The researcher might also measure the organisation by its use of communication, transportation, size, and distribution of power relative to the population. Improved abilities to communicate and transport tend to stabilise larger organisations and disrupt smaller ones.

Any given organisation cannot be easily reduced to a particular form of power. For instance, the police and army are quite obviously instruments of force and coercion, but it would be facile to say that they have power simply because of their ability to physically coerce. Rather, the police are regarded as instruments of a legitimate institution by some population, and the organisation depends upon propaganda and habit to maintain popular deference to their authority. Similarly, economic organisations operate by the use of conditioning, in the form of money; but the strength of an economy arguably depends in large part on the functional operation of law enforcement which makes commerce possible, by the regulation of peace and property rights.

The general effect of an organisation, Russell believes, is either to increase the well-being of persons, or to aid the survival of the organisation itself: "[I]n the main, the effects of organisations, apart from those resulting from governmental self-preservation, are such as to increase individual happiness and well-being."

==== Organizations and individuals ====
The types of relationship which any given individual may share with any given organisation can be assessed according to whether the organisation facilitates or suppresses the will of the person. The line between suppression and facilitation of the will is not absolute, but relative. An organisation may benefit one person or class of persons, while doing harm to another. Thus, for example, the police exist to enforce law and order, and this facilitates the will of the general populace; yet they also suppress the will of the criminal.

Of those whose wills are facilitated by an organisation, kinds include "the gentleman, the sage, the economic magnate, the political statesman", and "the covert manager" (or political wire-puller). Each beneficiary of power is parasitic upon certain kinds of organisations, and has certain key traits which uniquely put them at advantage:

Type of person:	Flourishes in:	Core virtue(s):
Gentleman	Hereditary power	Honour
Intellectual... a) Priest or Sage b) Technocrat	a) Uneducated society b) Educated market	a) Wisdom b) Expertise
Economic magnate	Large economic organisations	Quickness, resoluteness, insight
Democratic politician... a) Ordinary b) Demagogue	a) A democracy at peace b) A democracy at war, a monarchy, oligarchy	a) Solidity, sound judgment b) Determination, passion, boldness
Wirepuller	Non-meritocracies, nepotism	Power, not glory

Thus, a political wire-puller such as Grigori Rasputin enjoys power best when playing off another person's hereditary power, or when the organisation benefits largely from an air of mystery. By contrast, the wirepuller suffers a wane in power when the organizational élite is made up of competent individuals.

Of those whose wills may be suppressed, we may include "customers, voluntary members, involuntary members", and "enemies" (in order of ascending severity). Each form of membership is paired with typical forms of suppression. The will of the customer may be thwarted through fraud or deception, but this at least may be beneficial in providing the customer with the symbolic pleasure of some material goods. Voluntary organisations are able to threaten sanctions, such as expulsion, on its members. Voluntary organisations serve the positive function of providing relatively benign outlets for the human passion for drama, and for the impulse to power. Involuntary membership abandons all pretense to the benign. The clearest example of this kind of organisation, for Russell, is the State.

Organizations may also be directed specifically at influencing persons at some stage of life. Thus, we have midwives and doctors who are legally obliged to deliver the baby; as the child grows, the school, parents, and mass media come to the fore; as they reach working age, various economic organisations pull for the agent's attention; the church and the institution of marriage impact the actor in obvious ways; and finally, the State may provide a pension to the elderly.

==== Forms of governance ====
The forms of governance are the familiar ways in which organisations set up their leadership structures: as monarchies, oligarchies, and democracies. In these ways, any organisation – be it economic, or political – is able to seek out its goals.

Each form of government has its own merits and failings:

"The 'social contract', in the only sense in which it is not completely mythical, is a contract among conquerors, which loses its raison d'être if they are deprived of the benefits of conquest."
Bertrand Russell (1938:149)

- Russell notes that monarchy arises more naturally than any other form of government, and is most cohesive. All that a monarchy requires to remain in power is, first, for the population to be afraid of the monarch; and second, that the inner circle of supporters be inspired with both confidence and an implicit lust for power.

However, monarchies have severe problems. Contra Hobbes, no monarchy can be said to arise from a social contract within the wide population. Moreover, if a monarchy is hereditary, then the royal offspring will likely have no skill at governance; and if not, then civil war will ensue to determine the next in line. Finally, and perhaps most obviously, the monarch is not necessarily compelled to have any regard for the well-being of his or her subjects.

- Oligarchy, or rule of a few over the many, comes in many different guises:
  - Hereditary landed aristocracy, which (Russell argues) tends to be "conservative, proud, stupid, and rather brutal";
  - The bourgeoisie, a merchant class who had to earn their wealth. Historically, by Russell's account, they have tended to be more clever, astute, and diplomatic;
  - The industrial class, who are of "a totally different type" from the bourgeoisie, and are more apt to coerce than to behave diplomatically, due in large part to the impersonal relationships they have with their employees; and
  - The ideological élite. Ideological élites tend to allow for the reversion into monarchy, as well as admit to heavy censorship. However, their rule also has certain strengths. For instance, they are more likely to arrive at common agreement immediately after a revolution; they cannot represent a hereditary or economic minority of the population; and they tend towards being more politically conscious and active.
- Democracy, or the rule of the many over themselves. The rule of the masses is positive, in that it is less likely to lead to civil war than the alternatives. An ambivalent feature of democracy is the fact that representatives are forced to compromise their ideologies to stay in power, which can curb both positive and negative tendencies. On the negative side, democracies are not very good at dealing with subjects that demand expert authority or quick decisions. Moreover, a democracy is easily corruptible by politicians with agendas. Also, a democracy may easily slip into popular apathy which allows for corrupt politicians to go unchecked.

=== Ethics of power ===
Having completed those chapters which analyse the relevant aspects of power in social life, Russell shifts his focus onto the philosophical issues that are connected with those problems. Moving into this new terrain, he wonders what can be done to curb the efforts of those who love power. The answers can be found either in possible collective actions, or in individual duties.

==== Positive and private morality ====
"Among human beings, the subjection of women is much more complete at a certain level of civilisation than it is among savages. And the subjection is always reinforced by morality."
Bertrand Russell on the domination of women (1938:188–189)

There is a distinction between positive and private forms of morality. Positive morality tends to be associated with traditional power and following ancient principles with a narrow focus; for example, the norms and taboos of marital law. Personal morality is associated with revolutionary power and the following of one's own conscience.

The dominant social system will have some impact on the reigning positive moral codes of the population. In a system where filial piety is dominant, there will be greater emphasis in a culture upon the wisdom of the elderly. In a monarchy, the culture will be encouraged to believe in a morality of submission, with cultural taboos placed upon use of the imagination; both of which increase social cohesion by encouraging the self-censorship of dissent. Priestly power is not as impressive, even when it is in full bloom. At its peak, priestly power depends on not being opposed by kingly power and not being usurped by a morality of conscience; and even then, it faces the threat of wide scepticism. Still, some moral convictions do not seem to have any source at all in the power elite: for example, the treatment of homosexuality in the early twentieth century does not seem to be tied to the success of a particular rulership.

Russell wonders whether some other basis for ethics can be found besides positive morality. Russell associates positive morality with conservatism, and understands it as a way of acting which stifles the spirit of peace and fails to curb strife. Meanwhile, personal morality is the ultimate source of positive morality, and is more grounded in the intellect. However, personal morality is so deeply connected with the desires of individuals that, if it were left to be the sole guide to moral conduct, it would lead to the social chaos of the "anarchic rebel".

Advocating a compromise between positive and private morality, Russell first emphasises that there is such a thing as moral progress, a progress which may occur through revolutions. Second, he provides a method by which we can test whether a particular sort of private morality is a form of progress:

"An individual may perceive a way of life, or a method of social organisation, by which more of the desires of mankind could be satisfied than under the existing method. If he perceives truly, and can persuade men to adopt his reform, he is justified [in rebellion]."

==== Philosophy of power ====
Individual resistance to power can take two diametrically opposed forms: those which indulge the impulse to power, and those who seek to quell the impulse to power entirely.

Some of those who have attempted to find an escape from the impulse to power have resorted to forms of quietism or pacifism. One major proponent of such approaches was the philosopher Laozi. From Russell's perspective, such views are incoherent, since they only deny themselves coercive power, but retain an interest in persuading others to their cause; and persuasion is a form of power, for Russell. Moreover, he argues that the love of power can actually be a good thing. For instance, if one feels a certain duty towards their neighbours, they may attempt to attain power to help those neighbours. In sum, the focus of any policy should not be on a ban on kinds of power, but rather, on certain kinds of use of power.

"The love of power is a part of human nature, but power-philosophies are, in a certain precise sense, insane. The existence of the external world... can only be denied by a madman... Certified lunatics are shut up because of the proneness to violence when their pretensions are questioned; the uncertified variety are given control of powerful armies, and can inflict death and disaster upon all sane men within their reach."
Bertrand Russell (1938:212)

Other thinkers have emphasised the pursuit of power as a virtue. Some philosophies are rooted in the love of power because philosophies tend to be coherent unification in the pursuit of some goal or desire. Just as a philosophy may strive for truth, it may also strive for happiness, virtue, salvation, or, finally, power. Among those philosophies which Russell condemns as rooted in love of power: all forms of idealism and anti-realism, such as Johann Gottlieb Fichte's solipsism; certain forms of Pragmatism; Henri Bergson's doctrine of Creative evolution; and the works of Friedrich Nietzsche.

According to Russell's outlook on power, there are four conditions under which power ought to be pursued with moral conviction. First, it must be pursued only as a means to some end, and not as an end in itself; moreover, if it is an end in itself, then it must be of comparatively lower value than one's other goals. Second, the ultimate goal must be to help satisfy the desires of others. Third, the means by which one pursues one's goal must not be egregious or malign, such that they outweigh the value of the end; as (for instance) the gassing of children for the sake of future democracy . Fourth, moral doctrines should aim toward truth and honesty, not the manipulation of others.

To enact these views, Russell advises the reader to discourage cruel temperaments which arise out of a lack of opportunities. Moreover, the reader should encourage the growth of constructive skills, which provide the person with an alternative to easier and more destructive alternatives. Finally, they should encourage cooperative feeling, and curb competitive desires.

==== Taming arbitrary rule ====
Among the issues demanding collective ethical action, Russell identifies "political rule", "economic competition", "propagandistic competition", and "psychological life". To make positive changes in each of these spheres of collective behaviour, Russell believed that power would need to be made more diffuse and less arbitrary.

To succeed in the taming of arbitrary political rule, Russell says, a community's goal ought to be to encourage democracy. Russell insists that the beginning of all ameliorative reforms to government must presuppose democracy as a rule. Even lip service to oligarchies – for example, support for purportedly benevolent dictators – must be dismissed as fantastic.

Moreover, democracy must be infused with a respect for the autonomy of persons, so that the political body does not collapse into the tyranny of the majority. To prevent this result, people must have a well-developed sense of separation between acquiescence to the collective will, and respect for the discretion of the individual.

Collective action should be restricted to two domains. First, it should be used to treat problems that are primarily "geographical", which include issues of sanitation, transportation, electricity, and external threats. Second, it ought to be used when a kind of individual freedom poses a major threat to public order; for instance, speech that incites the breaking of law. The exception to this rule is when there is a minority which densely populates a certain well-defined area, in which case, political devolution is preferable.

In formulating his outlook on the preferable size of government, Russell encounters a dilemma. He notes that, the smaller the democracy, the more empowerment the citizen feels; yet the larger the democracy, the more the citizen's passions and interests are inflamed. In both situations, the result is voter fatigue. There are two possible solutions to this problem: to organise political life according to vocational interests, as with unionisation; or to organise it according to interest groups.

"In former days, men sold themselves to the Devil to acquire magical powers. Nowadays they acquire those powers from science, and find themselves compelled to become devils. There is no hope for the world unless power can be tamed, and brought into the service, not of this or that group of fanatical tyrants, but of the whole human race... for science has made it inevitable that all must live or all must die."
Bertrand Russell (1938:22)

A federal government is only sensible, for Russell, when it has limited but well-defined powers. Russell advocates the creation of a world government made up of sovereign nation-states. On his view, the function of a world government should only be to ensure the avoidance of war and the pursuit of peace. On the world stage, democracy would be impossible, because of the negligible power any particular individual could have in comparison with the entire human race.

One final suggestion for political policy reform is the notion that there ought to be a political balance in every branch of public service. Lack of balance in public institutions creates havens for reactionary forces, which in turn undermine democracy. Russell emphasises two conditions necessary for the achievement of balance. He advocates, first, the abolition of the legal standing of confessions as evidence, to remove the incentive for extraction of confession under torture by the police. Second, the creation of dual branches of police to investigate particular crimes: one which presumes the innocence of the accused, the other presuming guilt.

Competition, for Russell, is a word that may have many uses. Although most often meant to refer to competition between companies, it may also be used to speak of competition between states, between ideologues, between classes, rivals, trusts, workers, etc. On this topic, Russell ultimately wishes to answer two questions: "First, in what kinds of cases is competition technically wasteful? Secondly, in what cases is it desirable on non-technical grounds?". In asking these questions, he has two concerns directly in mind: economic competition, and the competition of propaganda.

The question of whether or not economic competition is defensible requires an examination from two perspectives: the moral point of view and the technical point of view.

From the view of the technician, certain goods and services can only be provided efficiently by a centralised authority. For Russell, it seems to be an economic fact that bigger organisations were capable of producing items at a certain standard, and best suited to fill needs that are geographical in nature, such as railways and water treatment. By contrast, smaller organisations (like businesses) are best suited to create products that are customised and local.

From the view of the ethicist, competition between states is on the same moral plane as competition between modern businesses. Indeed, by Russell's account, economic power and political power are both capable of devastation:

"In democratic countries, the most important private organisations are economic. Unlike secret societies, they are able to exercise their terrorism without illegality, since they do not threaten to kill their enemies, but only to starve them."

Since they are morally equivalent, perhaps it is not surprising that the cure for political injustices is identical to the cure for economic ones: namely, the institution of democracy in both economic and political spheres.

By 'economic democracy', Russell means a kind of democratic socialism, which at the very least involves the nationalisation of select industries (railways, water, television). In order for this to operate effectively, he argues that the social system must be such that power is distributed across a society of highly autonomous persons.

Russell is careful to indicate that his support for nationalisation rests on the assumption that it can be accomplished under the auspices of a robust democracy, and that it may be safeguarded against statist tyranny. If either condition fail, then nationalisation is undesirable. In delivering this warning, Russell emphasises the distinction between ownership and control. He points out that nationalisation – which would allow the citizens to collectively own an industry – would not guarantee any of them control over the industry. In the same way, shareholders own parts of companies, but the control of the company ultimately rests with the CEO.

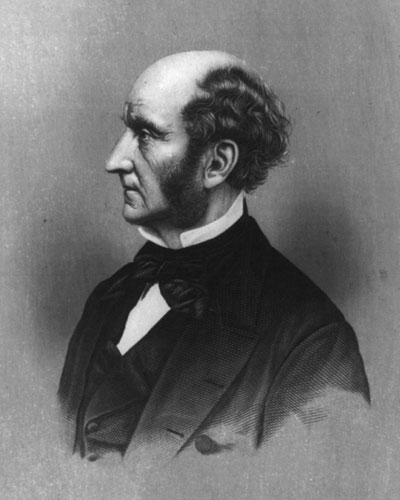
Russell sought to revise the doctrines of John Stuart Mill

Control over propaganda is another matter. When forming his argument here, Russell specifically targets the doctrines of John Stuart Mill. Russell argues that Mill's argument for the freedom of speech is too weak, so long as it is balanced against the harm principle; for any speech worth protecting for political reasons is likely to cause somebody harm. For example, the citizen ought to have the opportunity to impeach malicious governors, but that would surely harm the governor, at the very least.

Russell replaces Mill's analysis with an examination of the issue from four perspectives: the perspective of the governor, the citizen, the innovator, and the philosopher. The rational governor is always threatened by revolutionary activities, and can always be expected to ban speech which calls for assassination. Yet the governor would be advised to allow freedom of speech to prevent and diminish discontent among the subjects, and has no reason to suppress ideas which are unrelated to his governance, for instance the Copernican doctrine of heliocentrism. Relatedly, the citizen mainly understands free speech as an extension of the right to do peaceably that which could only otherwise be done through violence.

The innovator does not tend to care much about free speech, since they engage in innovation despite social resistance. Innovators may be separated into three categories: the hard millenarians, who believe in their doctrine to the exclusion of all others, and who only seek to protect the dissemination of their own creeds; the virtuous millenarians, who emphasise that revolutionary transitions must begin through rational persuasion and the guidance of sages, and so are supportive of free speech; and the progressives, who cannot foresee the direction of future progress, but recognise that the free exchange of ideas is a prerequisite to it. For the philosopher, free speech allows people to engage in rational doubt, and to grow in their prudential duties.

In any case, the citizen's right to dissent and to decide their governor is sacrosanct for Russell. He believes that a true public square could be operated by state-run media outlets, like the BBC, which would be charged with the duty to provide a wide range of points of view on political matters. For certain other topics, like art and science, the fullest and freest competition between ideas must be guaranteed.

The final discussion in the work is concerned with Russell's views on education. Citizens of a healthy democracy must have two virtues, for Russell: the "sense of self-reliance and confidence" necessary for autonomous action; and the humility required to "submit to the will of the majority" when it has spoken. The last chapter of Power: A New Social Analysis concentrates significantly on the question of how to inspire confidence in students, from an educator's point of view.

Two major conditions are necessary. First, the citizen/student must be free from hatred, fear, and the impulse to submit. Economic opportunities will have some impact on the student's temperament in this regard, and so, economic reforms need to be made to create more opportunities. But reform to the education system is also necessary, in particular, to foster in the student a kindness, curiosity, and intellectual commitment to science. The common trait of students with the scientific mind is a sense of balance between dogmatism and scepticism.

Moreover, the student must have good instructors, who emphasise reason over rhetoric. Russell indicates that the critical mind is an essential feature of the healthy citizen of a democracy, since collective hysteria is one of the greatest threats to democracy. To foster a critical mind, he suggests, the teacher ought to show the students the consequences of pursuing one's feelings over one's thoughts. For example, the teacher might allow students to choose a field trip between two different locations: one fantastic place which is given a dull overview, and a shabby place which is recommended by impressive advertisements. In teaching history, the teacher might examine a particular event from a multitude of different perspectives, and allow the students to use their critical faculties to make assessments of each. In all cases, the object would be to encourage self-growth, a willingness to be "tentative in judgment", and "responsiveness to evidence".

The work ends with the following words:

Fichte and the powerful men who have inherited his ideals, when they see children, think: 'Here is material that I can manipulate'... All this, to any person with natural affection for the young, is horrible; just as we teach children to avoid being destroyed by motor cars if they can, so we should teach them to avoid being destroyed by cruel fanatics... This is the task of a liberal education: to give a sense of the value of things other than domination, to help create wise citizens of a free community, and through the combination of citizenship with liberty in individual creativeness to enable men to give to human life that splendour which some few have shown that it can achieve .

== Historical context ==
Power (1938) is written with a mind toward the political ills that marred the headlines of the day. The work appeared at the brink of World War II, and contains more than one pointed reference to the dictatorships of Nazi Germany and fascist Italy, and one reference to the persecution of German Czechoslovaks. When his remarks treat of current affairs, they are often pessimistic. "Although men hate one another, exploit one another, and torture one another, they have, until recently, given their reverence to those who preached a different way of life." As Kirk Willis remarked on Russell's outlook during the 1930s, "the foreign and domestic policies of successive national governments repelled him, as did the triumph of totalitarian regimes on the continent and the seemingly inexorable march to war brought in their wake... Despairing that war could be avoided and convinced that such a European-wide conflict would herald a new dark age of barbarism and bigotry, Russell gave voice to his despondency in Which Way to Peace? (1936) – not so much a reasoned defence of appeasement as an expression of defeatism".

Ultimately, with his new analysis in hand, Russell hoped to instruct others on how to tame arbitrary power. He hoped that a stable world government composed of sovereign nation-states would eventually arise which would dissuade nations from engaging in war. In context, this argument was made years after the dissolution of the League of Nations (and years before the creation of the United Nations). Also, at many times during the work, Russell also mentions his desire to see a kind of socialism take root. This was true to his convictions of the time, during a phase in his career where he was convinced in the plausibility of guild socialism.

== Critical reception ==
Russell, a famous logician and epistemologist, had many side-interests in history, politics, and social philosophy. The paradigmatic public intellectual, Russell wrote prolifically in the latter topics to a wide and receptive audience. As one scholar writes, "Russell's prolific output spanned the whole range of philosophical and political thought, and he has probably been more widely read in his own lifetime than any other philosopher in history".

However, his writings in political philosophy have been relatively neglected by those working in the social sciences. From the point of view of many commentators, Power: A New Social Analysis has proven itself to be no exception to that trend. Russell would later comment that his work "fell rather flat". Samuel Brittan and Kirk Willis, who wrote the preface and introduction to the 2004 edition (respectively), both observed the relative lack of success of the work.

One reason why Power might be more obscure than competing texts in political philosophy is that it is written in a historical style which is not in keeping with its own theoretical goals. Willis remarked that, with hindsight, "Some of the responsibility for its tepid reception... rests with the book itself. A work of political sociology rather than of political theory, it does not in fact either offer a comprehensive new social analysis or fashion new tools of social investigation applicable to the study of power in all times or places".

Willis's review, written more than half a century past the original writing of the volume, is in some respects a gentler way of phrasing the work's immediate reception. One of Russell's contemporaries wrote: "As a contribution to social science... or to the study of government, the volume is very disappointing... In this pretentious volume, Russell shows only the most superficial familiarity with progress made in the study of social phenomena or in any special field of social research, either with techniques of inquiry, or with materials assembled, or with interpretations developed... it seems doubtful that the author knows what is going on in the world of social science." Indeed, the very preface of the work candidly states: "As usual, those who look in Russell's pronouncements for dotty opinions will be able to find a few". However, some other contemporary reviews were more positive. Russell's book was reviewed by George Orwell in The Adelphi magazine. Orwell praised the first half of the book, saying "The most interesting part of Mr. Russell's book is the earlier chapters in which he analyses the various types of power – priestly, oligarchical, dictatorial and so forth". However, Orwell criticized the second part of the book. Orwell argued that Russell did not put forward a convincing argument for creating a just and tolerant society, instead "a pious hope that the present state of things will not endure". Orwell suggested that "it does not prove that the slave society at which the dictators are aiming will be unstable." Orwell ended his review with praise for Russell's writing, and said Russell had "an essentially decent intellect, a kind of intellectual chivalry which is far rarer than mere cleverness". Other scholars, like Edward Hallet Carr, also found the work of some use.

Russell is routinely praised for his analytic treatment of philosophical issues. One commentator, quoted in Griffin 2003, p. 202, observes that "In the forty-five years preceding publication of Strawson's 'On Referring', Russell's theory was practically immune from criticism. There is not a similar phenomenon in contemporary analytic philosophy". Yet Power, along with many of his later works in social philosophy, is not obviously analytic. Rather, it takes the form of a series of examinations of semi-related topics, with a narrative dominated by historical illustrations. Nevertheless, Brittan emphasised the strengths of the treatise by remarking that it can be understood as "an enjoyable romp through history, in part anticipating some of the 1945 A History of Western Philosophy, but ranging wider".

In his autobiography (1967–69), Russell summarised the implications of Power, a new social analysis:

In this book I maintained that a sphere of freedom is still desirable even in a socialist state, but this sphere has to be defined afresh and not in liberal terms. This doctrine I still hold. The thesis of this book seems to me important, and I hoped that it would attract more attention than it has done. It was intended as a refutation both of Marx and of the classical economists, not on a point of detail, but on the fundamental assumptions that they shared. I argued that power, rather than wealth, should be the basic concept in social theory, and that social justice should consist in equalisation of power to the greatest practicable degree. It followed that State ownership of land and capital was no advance unless the State was democratic, and even then only if methods were devised for curbing the power of officials. A part of my thesis was taken up and popularised in Burnham's Managerial Revolution, but otherwise the book fell rather flat. I still hold, however, that what it has to say is of very great importance if the evils of totalitarianism are to be avoided, particularly under a Socialist régime.
