= Koupia =

Scientific classification
- Kingdom: Animalia
- Phylum: Chordata
- Clade: Synapsida
- Clade: Therapsida
- Clade: †Anomodontia
- Clade: †Dicynodontia
- Genus: †Koupia; Boonstra, 1948

Type species
- Koupia koupensis Boonstra, 1948

Extinct genus of dicynodonts

Koupia is a dubious extinct genus of non-mammalian synapsid. The type species, K. koupensis, was coined by Lieuwe Dirk Boonstra in 1948, with a well-preserved skull from the Tapinocephalus Assemblage Zone of South Africa, SAM-PK-11796, designated the holotype. This specimen has since been lost, and K. koupensis is currently considered a nomen dubium or a possible junior synonym of Brachyprosopus broomi.
