= A New Refutation of Time =

Essay by Jorge Luis Borges

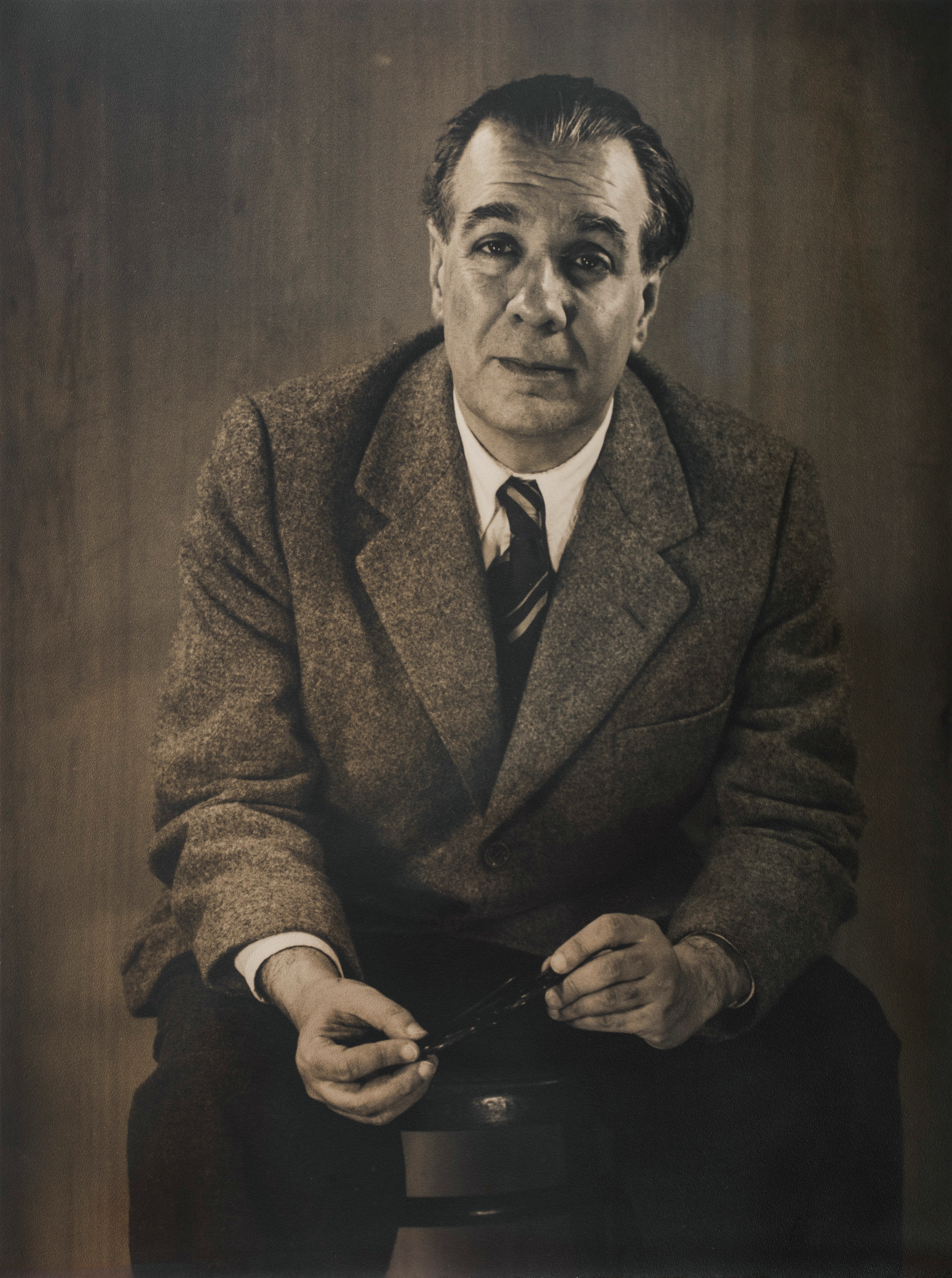
Jorge Luís Borges, 1951

"A New Refutation of Time" (original Spanish title: "Nueva refutación del tiempo") is an essay by Argentine writer Jorge Luis Borges (written between 1944 and 1946) in which he argues that the negations of idealism may be extended to time. It consists of a prologue and two articles: the first one was written in 1944 and appeared in number 115 of the review Sur; the second, written in 1946, is a rework of the first. Borges comments that he did not combine the two texts into one, as the reading of two analogous texts might facilitate the comprehension of an indocile subject.

Just as subjective idealist George Berkeley denies that there is a material object existing independently of our perception of it, and David Hume denies that there is a subject apart from a mere recollection of sensations (a reductionist, materialist worldview), Borges tries to posit that there is no time.

He proceeds on the assumption that if "man" is reduced, as according to Hume, to a collection of sensations, a single repeated perception, either in one man's life or in the experience of two different men, suffices to prove that time is a fallacy, since this repetition will destroy its linear sequence.
