= Wafaa El Saddik =

Egyptian Egyptologist

- Born: 1950 (age 75–76); Nile Delta, Egypt
- Occupation: Egyptologist
- Years active: 1977–2010
- Known for: Director General of the Egyptian Museum (2004–2010)

Wafaa El Saddik (also El-Saddik, Arabic: وفاء الصديق; born 1950) is an Egyptian Egyptologist, who from 2004 to 2010 was Director General of Cairo's Egyptian Museum. She was the first female director of the museum.

== Personal life ==
El Saddik was born in 1950 in the Nile Delta region of Egypt. During the Suez Crisis, her family moved to Cairo. She studied archaeology at Cairo University, and later completed a PhD at the University of Vienna.

El Saddik lived and worked in Cologne, Germany for 15 years, during which time she met her husband, an Egyptian who works as a pharmacist. They married in 1989, and have two children. Her sister has been the State Secretary for the Ministry of Water.

== Career ==
Originally El Saddik wished to become a journalist, due to her interest in the Six-Day War and Yom Kippur War. She became interested in archaeology after a trip to Thebes and the Aswan Dam.

El Saddik has provided historical tours to world leaders including Margaret Thatcher, Jimmy Carter, and Helmut Schmidt, as well as former Egyptian President Anwar al-Sadat. At the age of 27, El Saddik went to work for the Tutankhamun exhibition in New Orleans, United States.

From 2004 to 2010, El Saddik served as Director General of Cairo's Egyptian Museum. She was the museum's first female director. As director, El Saddik says that she received numerous politically motivated bids for funding for the museum. El Saddik claimed that the museum created a daily income of around one million Egyptian pounds, but most of this money was transferred to the central government rather than being spent there. In her book Protecting Pharaoh's Treasures, El Saddik said that she had predicted the Egyptian revolution of 2011, saying that she had believed it would be similar to the Tunisian Revolution. In October 2010, she was chosen by then Egyptian president Hosni Mubarak to select artefacts for an exhibition in Rome. Her choices were later rejected. She was forced into leaving her role at the museum in December 2010, as she had reached retirement age.

During the 2011 Egyptian revolution, El Saddik witnessed the looting of the Egyptian Museum and Memphis Museum. She blamed the incident on police officers and guardians of the museum. After the revolution, El Saddik expressed concern over the preservation of Egyptian historical artefacts.

== Book published in her honour ==
In 2025, Reichert Media published a book in her honour titled "Egypt's Greatest Treasure. Studies in Egyptology, Museology and Archaeology in Honour of Wafaa T. El-Saddik" edited by Konstantin C. Lakomy, Sabah Abdel Razik Saddik and Rafed El-Sayed (Wiesbaden, 2025), with 556 pages, 179 illustrations b/w, 687 illustrations color, hardback, Reichert Verlag (Publishing). It has a Preface in German and English on her, as well as a Title of Contents and a Sample PDF Article on Senusert III.
