= 1933 in philosophy =

1933 in philosophy

== Events ==
- Leroy Loemker agrees to tutor a youthful Lewis White Beck as he begins his study of philosophy at Emory University.

== Publications ==
- John Cowper Powys, A Philosophy of Solitude (1933)

== Births ==
- January 16 - Susan Sontag (died 2004)
- January 17 - Liu Gangji (died 2019)
- August 1 - Antonio Negri (died 2023)

== Deaths ==
- April 29 - Constantine P. Cavafy (born 1863)
- August 31 - Theodor Lessing (born 1872)
- October 15 - Nitobe Inazō (born 1862)
- December 18 - Hans Vaihinger (born 1852)
