= 1934 in philosophy =

1934 in philosophy was a critical year for the publication of a number of important works.

== Publications ==
- John Dewey, Art as Experience (1934)
- Karl Popper, The Logic of Scientific Discovery (1934)

== Births ==
- January 17 - Fabien Eboussi Boulaga, Cameroonian philosopher (died 2018)
- March 5 - Daniel Kahneman, Israeli-born psychologist and behavioral economist (died 2024)
- March 25 - Gloria Steinem
- April 13 - György Márkus (died 2016)
- April 14 - Fredric Jameson
- May 22 - Don Cupitt, English priest and theologian (died 2025)
- August 5 - Wendell Berry
- December 26 - Richard Swinburne, English philosopher
