= 1937 in philosophy =

1937 in philosophy

== Publications ==
- E. E. Evans-Pritchard, Witchcraft, Oracles and Magic Among the Azande [Note: This work starts the so-called 'rationality debates' in anthropology and philosophy.]
- Talcott Parsons, The Structure of Social Action
- Bernard Shaw, The Intelligent Woman's Guide to Socialism and Capitalism (Pelican Books paperback edition)
- Charles Stevenson, The Emotive Meaning of Ethical Terms

== Births ==
- January 17 - Alain Badiou
- June 5 - Hélène Cixous
- June 19 - André Glucksmann
- July 3 - Tom Stoppard
- July 4 - Thomas Nagel

== Deaths ==
- March 6 - Rudolf Otto (born 1869)
- March 15 - H. P. Lovecraft (born 1890)
- April 27 - Antonio Gramsci (born 1891)
- May 28 - Alfred Adler (born 1870)
