= 1953 in philosophy =

1953 in philosophy was a critical year for the publication of a number of important works.

== Events ==
- Internationale Hegelgesellschaft (International Hegel Society) was founded in 1953.
- Rudolf Carnap publishes an article called "Testability and Meaning" in Readings in the Philosophy of Science, which moves away from the philosophical position of logical positivism with respect to science (particularly the heavily mathematical sciences, such as physics). Carnap instead emphasizes the idea that progress in science depends on the gradual accumulation of many small results that support human understanding of the world, a view more in line with Ludwig Wittgenstein's later philosophy and the biological sciences.

== Publications ==
- Herman Dooyeweerd, A New Critique of Theoretical Thought, Volume I The Necessary Presuppositinos of Philosophy (1953)
- Sarvepalli Radhakrishnan, The Principal Upanishads (1953)
- Ludwig Wittgenstein, Philosophical Investigations (1953)
- Martin Heidegger, Introduction to Metaphysics (1953)
- Czesław Miłosz, The Captive Mind (1953)

== Births ==
- March 5 - Michael Sandel
- June 2 - Cornel West

== Deaths ==
- April 9
  - C. E. M. Joad, (born 1891)
  - Hans Reichenbach (born 1891)
- September 28 - Edwin Hubble (born 1889)
