= 1938 in philosophy =

These are the following events that transpired during 1938 in philosophy:

== Events ==
- September 2 – B. F. Skinner's ground-breaking book The Behavior of Organisms was first published. Of the 800 copies in the first printing, only 548 had been sold by 1946.
- The Institute of General Semantics is founded.

== Publications ==
- John Dewey, Logic: The Theory of Inquiry and Experience and Education
- Johan Huizinga, Homo Ludens
- Bertrand Russell, Power: A New Social Analysis
- Albert Einstein and Leopold Infeld, The Evolution of Physics
- Karl Jaspers, Philosophy of Existence
- Lewis Mumford, The Culture of Cities
- Henri de Lubac, Catholicism: Christ and the Common Destiny of Man
- Charles W. Morris, Foundations of the Theory of Signs
- Jean-Paul Sartre, Nausea (novel)
- Alan Turing, Systems of Logic Based on Ordinals
- Jean Wahl, Kierkegaardian Studies

== Births ==
- April 11 - Muhammad Shahrur, Syrian thinker and author (died 2019)
- July 8 - Justin Leiber (died 2016)
- July 10 - David Hugh Mellor, English philosopher (died 2020)
- August 3 - Remo Bodei (died 2019)
- November 16 - Robert Nozick (died 2002)

== Deaths ==
- March 27 - William Stern (born 1871)
- April 26 - Edmund Husserl (born 1859)
