= 1958 in archaeology =

The year 1958 in archaeology involved some significant events.

== Explorations ==
- Neolithic Tomb of the Eagles on Orkney first explored by Ronald Simison.
- Anil de Silva plans an all-woman expedition to China (at this time closed to Western visitors) for herself, Romila Thapar and photographer Dominique Darbois to study the cave paintings in Dunhuang and the Maijishan Grottoes in Gansu province.

== Excavations ==
- Maya site of Dzibilchaltun, National Geographic Society project under E. Wyllys Andrews IV.
- Maya site of Altar de Sacrificios, Peabody Museum project under A. Ledyard Smith and Gordon Willey (continues to 1963).
- Excavation project at Sardis by Harvard University and Cornell University begins.
- Excavation at Great Zimbabwe under Roger Summers.
- Excavations at Adlun in Southern Lebanon under Dorothy Garrod begin (continue to 1963).
- Excavations at Vaishali in Bihar begin (continue to 1962).
- Excavations at Brunswick Town, North Carolina under Stanley South begin (continue to 1968).
- Excavations at the Roman fort of Petuaria near Brough, East Riding of Yorkshire, England, begin (continue to 1962).
- Excavations and re-erection of trilithon at Stonehenge in England.

== Finds ==
- February 7: Discovery of "Deep Skull" in Niah Caves in Sarawak by Barbara and Tom Harrisson, at around 40,000 years BP the oldest known evidence of Homo sapiens in southeast Asia.
- April 2: Accidental discovery of the Caernarfon Mithraeum in Wales.
- July 4: St Ninian's Isle Treasure in Shetland by Douglas Coutts.
- August 18: Accidental discovery of Brymbo Man (c.2000 BCE) in Wales.
- October 26: Accidental discovery of wreckage from the Australian National Airways' 1931 Avro Ten Southern Cloud disappearance in the Snowy Mountains of New South Wales.
- Workshop of Phidias at Olympia.
- Çatalhöyük.
- Bajo de la Campana Phoenician shipwreck site on the Mediterranean coast of Spain first identified by divers.

== Publications ==
- M. W. Beresford and J. K. S. St Joseph - Medieval England : an aerial survey.
- John Chadwick - The Decipherment of Linear B.
- Gordon R. Willey and Philip Phillips - Method and Theory in American Archaeology.

== Events ==
- December 12–14: 'Problems relating to the Iron Age in Southern Britain' conference held in Oxford, organised by the Council for British Archaeology.

== Births ==
- May 18: David Mattingly, English archaeologist and historian of the Roman world
- October 11: Pavel Kuznetsov, Russian archaeologist, paleogeneticist and historian of the Bronze Age

== Deaths ==
- August 17: John Marshall, English Director-General of the Archaeological Survey of India (born 1876)
