= 1950 in archaeology =

Below are notable events in archaeology that occurred in 1950.

== Explorations ==
- Spring: Explorations at Timna in Yemen by Wendell Phillips of the American Foundation for the Study of Man (continues in 1951).

== Excavations ==
- Excavations at Stonehenge in the south of England by R. J. C. Atkinson, Stuart Piggott and J. F. S. Stone.
- Excavations at Wharram Percy in the north of England by Maurice Beresford begin.
- Excavations at Beitin, West Bank.
- Excavations at Gordion in Turkey by the University of Pennsylvania Museum under Rodney S. Young begin.

== Finds ==
- March 1 - A hoard of Roman coins is discovered at Hordley Grange, Shropshire, England.
- May 8 - A bog body known as "Tollund Man" is discovered in Denmark.
- The Upchurch Hoard is discovered in Upchurch, Kent, England.
- A third premolar is discovered in materials sent back to Sweden by Otto Zdansky from his excavations of the Peking Man site at Zhoukoudian, China in 1921 and 1923.
- Balfarg, a prehistoric site in Fife, Scotland, is discovered through air photography.
- Three Roman mosaic pavements are found at Harpham in the East Riding of Yorkshire, England.
- Stabiae (buried by the eruption of Mount Vesuvius) is rediscovered.
- The Garima Gospels at Abba Garima Monastery in Ethiopia first become known to Western scholars.

== Events ==
- January 1 - Commencement date (epoch) of the Before Present time scale.

== Publications ==
- T. C. Lethbridge - Herdsmen and Hermits: Celtic Seafarers in the Northern Seas.
- V. E. Nash-Williams - The Early Christian Monuments of Wales.

== Births ==
- January 25 - Phil Harding, English field archaeologist
- Wafaa El Saddik, Egyptian Egyptologist

== Deaths ==
- January 27 - Herbert Eustis Winlock, American Egyptologist who worked for the New York Metropolitan Museum of Art (b. 1884)
