= 1936 in philosophy =

1936 in philosophy was a critical year for the publication of a number of important works.

== Publications ==
- Jacques Maritain, Integral Humanism (1936)
- John Maynard Keynes, The General Theory of Employment, Interest and Money (1936)
- Walter Benjamin, The Work of Art in the Age of Mechanical Reproduction (1936)
- Jean Piaget, The Origin of Intelligence in the Child (1936)
- A. J. Ayer, Language, Truth, and Logic (1936)
- Alan Watts, The Spirit of Zen (1936)

== Births ==
- January 31 – Michel Hulin (died 2026)
- February 18 - Ian Hacking (died 2023)
- August 26 - Benedict Anderson (died 2015)
- November 28 - Carol Gilligan

== Deaths ==
- April 9 - Ferdinand Tönnies (born 1855)
- May 8 - Oswald Spengler (born 1880)
- June 12 - Karl Kraus (born 1874)
- June 14 - G. K. Chesterton (born 1874)
- June 22 - Moritz Schlick (born 1882)
- July 25 - Heinrich Rickert (born 1863)
- December 31 - Miguel de Unamuno (born 1864)
