= 1942 in archaeology =

Below are notable events in archaeology that occurred in 1942.

== Publications ==
- V. Gordon Childe - What Happened in History.

== Finds ==
- January: Mildenhall Treasure discovered by ploughman Gordon Butcher in Suffolk, England.
- A hoard of La Tène metalwork is found during the building of a military airfield in Llyn Cerrig Bach on Anglesey.
- Rockbourne Roman Villa discovered by a local farmer in Rockbourne, England.

== Births ==
- 13 January – Khaled Nashef, Palestinian archaeologist (died 2009)
- 30 October – Linda Schele, Mayanist (died 1998)
- 7 December – Anna Maria Bietti Sestieri, Italian archaeologist (died 2023)

== Deaths ==
- July 28: William Matthew Flinders Petrie, Egyptologist (born 1853)
