= 1949 in science =

The year 1949 in science and technology involved some significant events, listed below.

== Astronomy and space exploration ==
- January 26 – The Hale Telescope at Palomar Observatory in California, the largest aperture optical telescope in the world for 28 years, sees first light.
- June 14 – Albert II, a rhesus monkey, becomes the first mammal in space, in a U.S.-launched V-2 rocket, reaching an altitude of 83 miles (134 km) but dying on impact after a parachute failure.

== Chemistry ==
- Radiocarbon dating technique discovered by Willard Libby and his colleagues at the University of Chicago—work for which Libby will receive the Nobel Prize in 1960.
- A group including Dorothy Hodgkin publish the three-dimensional molecular structure of penicillin, demonstrating that it contains a β-lactam ring.

== Computer science ==
- April – Manchester Mark 1 computer operable at the University of Manchester in England.
- May 6 – EDSAC, the first practicable stored-program computer, runs its first program at University of Cambridge in England, to calculate a table of squares.

== Earth sciences ==
- August 5 – Ambato earthquake in Ecuador, measuring 6.8 on the Richter magnitude scale.
- Patomskiy crater in Siberia is discovered by Russian geologist Vadim Kolpakov.

== History of science ==
- Herbert Butterfield publishes The Origins of Modern Science, 1300–1800.

== Mathematics ==
- Ákos Császár discovers the Császár polyhedron.
- D. R. Kaprekar discovers the convergence property of the number 6174.

== Medicine ==
- The use of lithium salts to control mania is rediscovered by Australian psychiatrist John Cade, the first mood stabilizer.
- First implant of intraocular lens, by Sir Harold Ridley
- First Sixteen Personality Factor Questionnaire, a self-report personality test, released.

== Meteorology ==
- January 11 – Los Angeles receives its first recorded snowfall.

== Philosophy ==
- Gilbert Ryle's book The Concept of Mind, a founding document in the philosophy of mind, is published.

== Physics ==
- Freeman Dyson demonstrates the equivalence of the formulations of quantum electrodynamics existing at this time, incidentally inventing the Dyson series.
- The Lanczos tensor is introduced in general relativity by Cornelius Lanczos.
- Pauli–Villars regularization is first published.

== Zoology ==
- J. B. S. Haldane proposes the Darwin as a unit of evolutionary change.
- Konrad Lorenz publishes King Solomon's Ring (Er redete mit dem Vieh, den Vögeln und den Fischen).

== Awards ==
- Nobel Prizes
  - Physics – Hideki Yukawa
  - Chemistry – William Francis Giauque
  - Medicine – Walter Rudolf Hess, Antonio Caetano De Abreu Freire Egas Moniz

== Births ==
- January 25 – Paul Nurse, English cell biologist, winner of the Nobel Prize in Physiology or Medicine.
- February 1 – Alice Alldredge, Australian-born oceanographer.
- February 17 – Peter Piot, Belgian microbiologist and epidemiologist.
- February 19 – Danielle Bunten Berry, born Dan(iel Paul) Bunten (died 1998), American software developer.
- February 22 – Tullio Pozzan (died 2022), Italian biochemist.
- March 28 – Michael W. Young, American geneticist and chronobiologist, winner of the Nobel Prize in Physiology or Medicine.
- April 5 – Judith Resnik (died 1986), American astronaut.
- April 18 – Yasumasa Kanada, Japanese mathematician.
- May 24 – Tomaž Pisanski, Slovenian mathematician.
- May 26 – Ward Cunningham, American computer programmer.
- June 2 – Heather Couper (died 2020), English astronomer.
- July 23 – Andrew Odlyzko, Polish-born American mathematician.
- August 31 – H. David Politzer, American physicist, winner of the Nobel Prize in Physics.
- November 6 – John Zarnecki, English space scientist
- November 24 – Sally Davies, English Chief Medical Officer.
- Michael Houghton, British-born virologist, winner of the Nobel Prize in Physiology or Medicine.

== Deaths ==
- February 22 – Félix d'Herelle (died 1873), French-Canadian microbiologist, a co-discoverer of bacteriophages.
- April 28 – Robert Robertson (born 1869), British chemist.
- May 27
  - Ægidius Elling (born 1861), Norwegian gas turbine pioneer.
  - Martin Knudsen (born 1871), Danish physicist.
- August 5 – Ernest Fourneau (born 1872), French medicinal chemist.
