= 1949 in archaeology =

Below are notable events in archaeology that occurred in 1949.

== Events ==
- November 21–23 - First Internationales Sachsensymposion held.
- University of New Mexico transfers lands to the National Park Service and expands Chaco Canyon National Monument, with the proviso that the university may continue scientific research.

== Excavations ==
- February 15 - Gerald Lankester Harding and Roland de Vaux begin excavations at Cave 1 of the Qumran Caves in the West Bank region of Jordan, the location of the first seven Dead Sea Scrolls.
- Excavation work recommences at the Peking Man Site in Zhoukoudian, China.
- Alberto Ruz Lhuillier begins excavations of the Temple of the Inscriptions, Palenque.
- Seton Lloyd begins excavations at Sakçagözü.
- Grahame Clark begins excavations at Star Carr, North Yorkshire (continues to 1951).
- Conclusion of excavations in the Vatican Necropolis.

== Finds ==
- Radiocarbon dating technique discovered by Willard Libby and his colleagues during his tenure as a professor at the University of Chicago.
- Anak Tomb No. 3 (dated 357 CE) found in North Korea.
- New excavations at Peking Man Site in Zhoukoudian, China unearth 5 teeth and fragments of thigh and shin bone.
- First new discoveries of Nimrud ivories by British School of Archaeology in Iraq led by Max Mallowan.
- 12th century murals discovered in Coombes Church, West Sussex, England.

== Publications ==
- 'C. W. Ceram' - Götter, Gräber und Gelehrte (Gods, Graves and Scholars: the story of archaeology).
- T. D. Kendrick - Late Saxon and Viking Art.

== Births ==
- Dolores Piperno - American archaeologist

== Deaths ==
- 23 April - Percy Newberry, English archaeologist (b. 1869)
