= 1946 in archaeology =

Below are notable events in archaeology that occurred in 1946.

== Explorations ==
- Maria Reiche begins to map the Nazca Lines.
- Mikhail Mikhaylovich Gerasimov investigates the burial site of Yuri Dolgorukiy (d. 1157) at the Church of the Saviour at Berestove in Ukraine but no remains are found.

== Excavations ==
- Ferriby Boats 1 and 2 excavated in England.
- Three-year excavation of Eridu by Fuad Safar and Seton Lloyd of the Iraqi Directorate General of Antiquities and Heritage begins.

== Publications ==
- November - Agatha Christie Mallowan, Come, Tell Me How You Live.

== Finds ==
- Lacandon Maya lead photographer/explorer Giles Healey to Bonampak, the first time it is known to have been visited by a non-Mayan.
- Filitosa, Corsica, discovered.
- November - First Dead Sea Scrolls discovered.

== Births ==
- July 1 - Mick Aston, English archaeologist best known for his work on Time Team (died 2013)
- August 12 - Bryony Coles, née Orme, English prehistoric landscape archaeologist
- December 29 - Ruth Shady, Peruvian archaeologist

=== Deaths ===
- November 17 - Max von Oppenheim, German Near Eastern archaeologist (born 1860)
