= 1943 in archaeology =

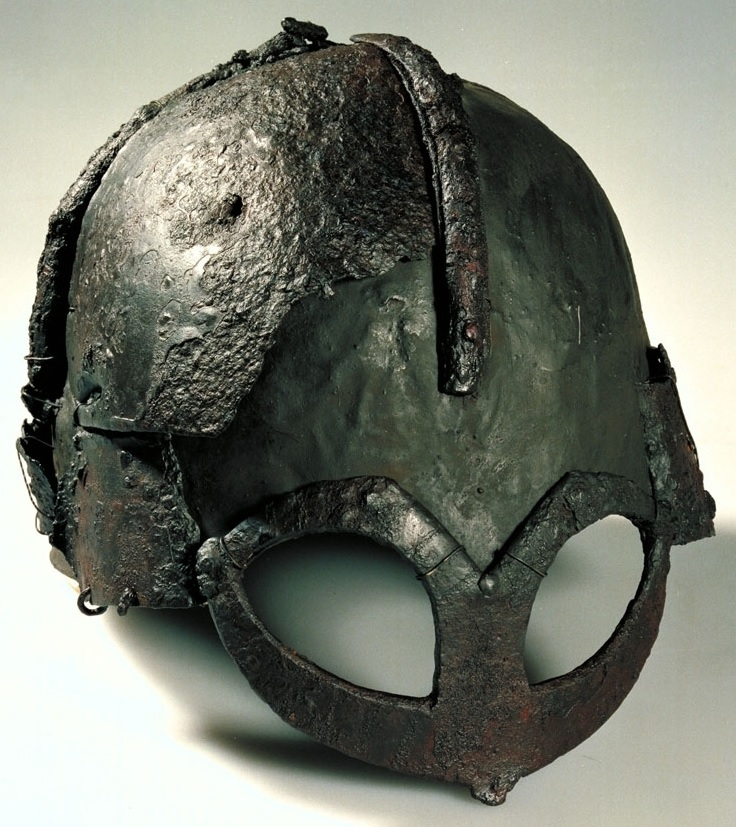
Gjermundbu helmet

Below are notable events in archaeology that occurred in 1943.

== Excavations ==
- Excavations at Olmec site of La Venta by Matthew Stirling end.
- Start of excavations at El Tajín by José Garcia Payon.
- Start of excavations at Hassuna by a team from the Iraqi Directorate General of Antiquities led by Seton Lloyd (continue to 1945).

== Publications ==
- Christopher and Jacquetta Hawkes - Prehistoric Britain.

== Finds ==
- May 20 - Luttra Woman, a skeletonised early Neolithic bog body, is found in Sweden.
- First finds of Gaudo culture in Campania.
- Cache of late-medieval wax votive images at Exeter Cathedral in England.
- "Greta", a skull found in the midlands of England, is believed to be the oldest in Britain, dated to 14,000 years BP, until redated to the late 11th century CE in 2021.

== Miscellaneous ==
- The National Trust purchases Avebury from Alexander Keiller.
- November - Max von Oppenheim's private archaeological museum in Berlin is destroyed by bombing.

== Births ==
- July 2 - Peter Woodman, Irish archaeologist (d. 2017)
- July 20 - Gordon Hillman, British archaeobotanist (d. 2018)
- December 17 - Heidemarie Koch, German Iranologist (d. 2022)
- September 28 - Anna Ritchie, British archaeologist of Orkney (d. 2026)

== Deaths ==
- April 7 - Auguste Audollent, French historian, archaeologist and Latin epigrapher (b. 1864)
- September 5 - Aleš Hrdlička, Czech-American anthropologist (b. 1869)
- October 26 - Aurel Stein, Hungarian-British Central Asian archaeologist (b. 1862)
