= 1947 in archaeology =

- 1780s ^{.} 1790s in archaeology ^{.} 1800
- Other events: 1790s ^{.} Archaeology timeline

Below are notable events in archaeology that occurred in 1947.

== Explorations ==
- Donaldson site in Ontario, Canada first documented.

== Excavations ==
- Mortimer Wheeler excavates Brahmagiri for the Archaeological Survey of India.
- Stuart Piggott begins excavations at Cairnpapple Hill in Scotland.
- J. F. S. Stone excavates the first trench across the Stonehenge cursus.

== Publications ==
- I. A. Richmond - Roman Britain (London: Collins).

== Finds ==
- April: Previous discoveries of the Dead Sea Scrolls and the Nag Hammadi codices become known. The Dead Sea Scrolls are found east of Jerusalem, in caves at Qumran, near the Dead Sea.
- 18 April: 'Mrs. Ples', an Australopithecus africanus skull, is discovered in the Sterkfontein area in Transvaal, South Africa.
- Star Carr discovered in North Yorkshire.

== Miscellaneous ==
- 7 August: Thor Heyerdahl's balsa raft Kon-Tiki makes landfall on Raroia in the Tuamotu Islands after a 101-day journey from Peru.
- Max Mallowan appointed Professor of Western Asiatic Archaeology at the University of London and director of the British School of Archaeology in Iraq, where he directs the resumption of its work at Nimrud.

== Births ==
- 28 May: Zahi Hawass, Egyptian Egyptologist.
- 5 July: Bob Carr, American archaeologist.
- 24 July: Miranda Aldhouse-Green, British archaeologist.
- Franck Goddio, Moroccan-born French underwater archaeologist.

== Deaths ==
- 7 June: Julio C. Tello, Peruvian archaeologist (b. 1880)
- 25 August: Franz Cumont, Belgian archaeologist (b. 1868)
