= 1946 in philosophy =

1946 in philosophy was important for the publication of a number of important works, in the aftermath of World War II. A number of notable sociologists were born during the Baby Boom Generation that started in 1945.

== Publications ==
- Michael Polanyi, Science, Faith and Society (1946)
- Erich Auerbach, Mimesis: The Representation of Reality in Western Literature (1946)

== Births ==
- April 22 - Paul Davies
- July 3 - Jean-Luc Marion
- July 6 - Peter Singer
- August 11 - Marilyn vos Savant
- September 7 - Francisco Varela (died 2001)
- December 10 - Raymond Geuss
