= 1941 in philosophy =

1941 in philosophy

== Publications ==
- Erich Fromm, Escape from Freedom (1941)
- Gershom Scholem, Major Trends in Jewish Mysticism (1941)

=== Philosophical literature ===
- Jorge Luis Borges, The Library of Babel (1941)
- Maurice Blanchot, Thomas the Obscure (1941)

== Births ==
- January 22 - Jaan Kaplinski (died 2021)
- February 16 - John Brockman
- March 19 - Joxe Azurmendi (died 2025)
- May 24 - George Lakoff
- June 24 - Julia Kristeva
- August 23 - Onora O'Neill
- September 24 - Jesús Mosterín, Spanish philosopher (died 2017)
- September 28 - David Lewis (died 2001)

== Deaths ==
- January 4 - Henri Bergson (born 1859)
- April 16 - Hans Driesch (born 1867)
- April 24 - Benjamin Lee Whorf (born 1897)
- August 7 - Rabindranath Tagore (born 1861)
