= 1939 in philosophy =

1939 in philosophy, the year World War II is generally counted as having started, was a critical year for the publication of a number of important works.

== Publications ==
- G. E. Moore, Proof of an External World (1939)
- Norbert Elias, The Civilizing Process (1939)

== Births ==
- January 29 - Germaine Greer
- March 1 - Tzvetan Todorov (died 2017)
- Clément Rosset (unspecified)

== Deaths ==
- February 4 - Edward Sapir (born 1884)
- September 23 - Sigmund Freud (born 1856)
