= 1949 in philosophy =

1949 in philosophy

== Publications ==
- Karl Jaspers, The Origin and Goal of History (1949); Note: Jaspers coined the term Axial Age.
- Aldo Leopold, A Sand County Almanac (1949)
- Gilbert Ryle, The Concept of Mind (1949)
- Joseph Campbell, The Hero with a Thousand Faces (1949)
- Jean Fourastié, Le Grand Espoir du XXe siècle (1949, no English translation available?)
- Simone de Beauvoir, The Second Sex (1949)

=== Philosophical fiction ===
- George Orwell, Nineteen Eighty-Four (1949)

== Births ==
- January 1 - Ljubodrag Simonović, Serbian philosopher, author and basketball player
- January 2 - Iris Marion Young (died 2006)
- January 11 - Jean-Paul Enthoven, French philosopher and publisher
- March 21 - Slavoj Žižek, Slovenian cultural theorist
- April 13 - Christopher Hitchens, British-American journalist (died 2011)
- June 30 - Alain Finkielkraut
- July 18 - Axel Honneth

== Deaths ==
- November 23 - Gustav Radbruch (born 1878)
