= 1954 in philosophy =

This is a list of information about philosophy in 1954.

== Publications ==
- Ernst Bloch, The Principle of Hope (1954)

=== Philosophical fiction ===
- Iris Murdoch, Under the Net (1954)

== Births ==
- May 8 - Kwame Anthony Appiah
- November 2 - Leonard Lawlor
- November 28 - Julian Nida-Rümelin

== Deaths ==
- June 7 - Alan Turing (born 1912)
