= 1953 in archaeology =

Below are notable events in archaeology that occurred in 1953.

== Excavations ==
- German excavations at Uruk, Iraq resume.

== Finds ==
- Banpo, a group of 6,500-year-old Neolithic settlements on the eastern outskirts of the Chinese city of Xi'an.
- "Cave of Letters" at Nahal Hever in the Judaean Desert (with correspondence from the Bar Kokhba revolt of ca. 132–136 CE) identified.
- al-Khader Phoenician arrowheads.
- Jerusalem ossuaries found stored in a cave on the Mount of Olives near Jerusalem by Franciscans.
- The Narsaq stick is found in Greenland, the first example of Viking Age runic inscriptions found in the country.
- 1st century Roman leather bikini briefs found in the City of London.

== Events ==
- November 21: Piltdown Man is shown to be a hoax (first presented by Charles Dawson in 1912).

== Publications ==
- O. G. S. Crawford - Archaeology in the Field (Dent).
- B. H. St.J. O'Neil - Castles: an introduction to the castles of England and Wales (HMSO).
- Gordon R. Willey - Prehistoric Settlement Patterns in the Virú Valley, Perú (Bureau of American Ethnology).

== Births ==
- Mensun Bound, Falkland Islands-born maritime archaeologist
- Arlen F. Chase, American archaeologist whose work focuses on Mesoamerica
- Mahmoud Hawari, Palestinian archaeologist and academic

== Deaths ==
- March 24: Félix-Marie Abel, French biblical archaeologist (b. 1878)
