= 1951 in philosophy =

1951 in philosophy was a critical year for the publication of a number of important works.

== Publications ==
- Theodor W. Adorno, Minima Moralia
- Hannah Arendt, The Origins of Totalitarianism
- Kenneth Arrow, Social Choice and Individual Values, popularizing social choice theory and Arrow's impossibility theorem
- Albert Camus, The Rebel (L'Homme révolté)
- Eric Hoffer, The True Believer
- Karl Huber (executed 1943), Leibniz
- Marshall McLuhan, The Mechanical Bride: Folklore of Industrial Man
- Hans Reichenbach, The Rise of Scientific Philosophy
- Willard Van Orman Quine, "Two Dogmas of Empiricism," The Philosophical Review

== Births ==
- January 1 - Luc Ferry
- January 14 - Jonathan Westphal
- June 2 - François Jullien

== Deaths ==
- January 5 - Andrei Platonov (born 1899)
- January 7 - René Guénon (born 1886)
- April 4 - Sadegh Hedayat (born 1903)
- April 29 - Ludwig Wittgenstein (born 1889)
