= 1942 in philosophy =

1942 in philosophy was a critical year for the publication of a number of important works, during the worst days of World War II.

== Events ==
- American Society for Aesthetics was founded in 1942.

== Publications ==
- C. S. Lewis, The Screwtape Letters (1942)
- Stephen Pepper, World Hypotheses (1942)

=== Philosophical literature ===
- Albert Camus, The Stranger (1942)

== Births ==
- January 24 - Melvin Fitting, American logician
- February 24 - Gayatri Chakravorty Spivak
- March 28 - Daniel Dennett (died 2024)
- April 12 - Ellen Meiksins Wood (died 2016)
- April 22 - Giorgio Agamben
- April 26 - John Deely
- October 21 - Paul Churchland
- December 11 Derek Parfit (died 2017)
- John McDowell (unspecified) (born 1942)

== Deaths ==
- February 22 - Stefan Zweig (born 1881)
- April 15 - Robert Musil (born 1880)
- December 21 - Franz Boas (born 1858)
