= 1952 in science =

The year 1952 in science and technology involved some significant events, listed below.

== Biology ==
- August 1 – Around 9 o'clock AM Pacific Time Zone, the San Benedicto rock wren goes extinct as its island home is smothered in a massive volcanic eruption.
- August 14 – Alan Turing's paper "The Chemical Basis of Morphogenesis" is published, putting forward a reaction–diffusion hypothesis of pattern formation, considered a seminal piece of work in morphogenesis.
- August 28 – Alan Hodgkin and Andrew Huxley publish the Hodgkin–Huxley model of action potentials in neurons of the squid giant axon.
- September 20 – Publication of the paper on the Hershey–Chase experiment showing conclusively that DNA, not protein, is the genetic material of bacteriophages.
- October – Danish virologist Preben von Magnus publishes his observation of the von Magnus phenomenon producing defective interfering particles.
- Biochemists Jack Gross and Rosalind Pitt-Rivers discover the thyroid hormone triiodothyronine.
- The Braeburn apple cultivar is discovered as a chance seedling in New Zealand.
- Last confirmed sighting of the Caribbean monk seal, at Serranilla Bank, between Jamaica and Nicaragua.

== Chemistry ==
- Soviet scientists L. V. Radushkevich and V. M. Lukyanovich publish images of carbon nanotubes.

== Computer science ==
- The first autocode and its compiler are developed by Alick Glennie for the Manchester Mark 1 computer, considered as the first working high-level compiled programming language.

== History of science ==
- Discovery by Derek J. de Solla Price of a lost medieval scientific work entitled Equatorie of the Planetis, initially attributed to Geoffrey Chaucer.

== Mathematics ==
- John Forbes Nash Jr. produces groundbreaking work in the area of real algebraic geometry.
- The Bradley–Terry model in probability theory is presented.

== Medicine ==
- February 6 – A mechanical heart is used for the first time in a human patient, in the United States.
- March 1 – The British Psychological Society is founded.
- April 26 – The link between coeliac disease and the gluten element of wheat is published by a team at the University of Birmingham (England).
- September 2 – The first successful operation to correct a cardiac shunt ("hole in the heart") is performed by Drs F. John Lewis and C. Walton Lillehei on a 5-year-old girl in the United States utilising the induced hypothermia technique developed by Wilfred Gordon "Bill" Bigelow.
- November – Royal College of General Practitioners established in the United Kingdom.
- November 20 – The first successful sex reassignment surgery is performed in Copenhagen, making George Jorgensen Jr. become Christine Jorgensen.
- December 14 – The first successful surgical separation of conjoined twins is conducted in Mount Sinai Hospital, Cleveland, Ohio.
- December – Robert Gwyn Macfarlane and colleagues publish the first identification of Haemophilia B.
- American obstetrical anesthesiologist Dr. Virginia Apgar devises the Apgar score as a simple replicable method of quickly and summarily assessing the health of babies immediately after childbirth.
- American orthopedic surgeon Armin Klein publishes Klein's line as a diagnostic tool.
- Jean Delay, head of psychiatry at Sainte-Anne Hospital, Paris, with Jean-François Buisson, reports the antidepressant effect of isoniazid.

== Physics ==
- November 1 – Nuclear testing: Operation Ivy – The United States successfully detonates the first hydrogen device, codenamed "Ivy Mike" ["m" for megaton], at Eniwetok island in the Bikini Atoll located in the Pacific Ocean. The elements einsteinium and fermium are discovered in the fallout.
- Geoffrey Dummer proposes the integrated circuit.

== Technology ==
- September 30 – The Cinerama widescreen film system, developed by Fred Waller, debuts with the movie This Is Cinerama at the Broadway Theatre in New York City.
- October 7 – The barcode is patented in the United States by Norman J. Woodland and Bernard Silver, though it does not make its first appearance in an American shop until 1974.

== Awards ==
- Nobel Prizes
  - Physics – Felix Bloch, Edward Mills Purcell
  - Chemistry – Archer John Porter Martin, Richard Laurence Millington Synge
  - Medicine – Selman Abraham Waksman

== Births ==
- February 2 – Ralph Merkle, American computer scientist, co-inventor of public-key cryptography.
- February 15 – Frances Ashcroft, English geneticist.
- February 19 – Marcia McNutt, American geophysicist, science editor, and president of the National Academy of Sciences.
- February 28 – Simon P. Norton (died 2019), English mathematician, co-discoverer of 'monstrous moonshine'.
- March 24 – Reinhard Genzel, German astrophysicist, Nobel Prize in Physics, co-discovererer of black holes.
- March 26 – Gary Ruvkun, American molecular biologist, Nobel Prize in Physiology or Medicine.
- July 15 – Ann Dowling, English mechanical engineer.
- August 14 – Peter Fonagy, Hungarian-born British psychoanalyst and clinical psychologist.
- August 25 – Charles M. Rice, American virologist, Nobel Prize in Physiology or Medicine, co-discovererer of the hepatitis C virus.
- Venki Ramakrishnan, Indian-born American-British structural biologist.

== Deaths ==
- March 5 – Sir Charles Sherrington (born 1857), English neurophysiologist and bacteriologist, Nobel Prize in Physiology or Medicine 1932.
- April 2 – Bernard Lyot (born 1897), French astronomer.
- April 8 – Tadeusz Estreicher (born 1871), Polish chemist.
- June 17 – Jack Parsons (born 1914), American rocket engineer and occultist.
- September 5 – Hermann Stieve (born 1886), German anatomist and histologist.
- November 2 – Chaim Weizmann (born 1874), Belarusian-born chemist, first President of Israel.
- November 24 – André Rochon-Duvigneaud (born 1863), French ophthalmologist.
- December 4 – Karen Horney (born 1885), German American psychoanalyst.
- December 19 – Colonel Sir Charles Arden-Close (born 1865), British cartographer.
