= 1950 in philosophy =

1950 in philosophy

== Events ==
- Bertrand Russell was awarded the 1950 Nobel Prize in Literature "in recognition of his varied and significant writings in which he champions humanitarian ideals and freedom of thought".

== Publications ==
- Martin Heidegger, Off the Beaten Track including the essay The Origin of the Work of Art (originally published in German as Holzwege in 1950)
- Norbert Wiener, The Human Use of Human Beings (1950)
- Ernst Gombrich, The Story of Art (1950)
- Alan Turing, Computing Machinery and Intelligence (1950)

== Births ==
- September 9 - Seyla Benhabib

== Deaths ==
- February 2 - Constantin Carathéodory (born 1873)
- March 1 - Alfred Korzybski (born 1879)
- September 6 - Olaf Stapledon (born 1886)
- October 9 - Nicolai Hartmann (born 1882)
