= 1948 in science =

The year 1948 in science and technology involved some significant events, listed below.

== Astronomy and space science ==
- February 16 – Miranda, innermost of the large moons of Uranus, is discovered by Gerard Kuiper from the McDonald Observatory in Texas.
- October 10 – An R-1 (missile) on test becomes the first Soviet launch to enter space.

== Biology ==
- August 7 – Teaching and research in Mendelian genetics is prohibited in the Soviet Union in favour of Lysenkoist theories of the inheritance of acquired characteristics.
- October 5 – Delegates to a conference organised by Sir Julian Huxley at Fontainebleau agree to formation of the International Union for Conservation of Nature.
- November 20 – The South Island takahē, a flightless bird generally thought to have been extinct for fifty years, is rediscovered by Geoffrey Orbell near Lake Te Anau in the South Island of New Zealand.
- Last recorded sighting of the Caspian tiger in Kazakhstan.
- Publication of Fairfield Osborne's Our Plundered Planet, a Malthusian critique of human environmental destruction.

== Computer science ==
- May 12 – World's first stored-program computer operates, the mechanical ARC (Automatic Relay Calculator) at Birkbeck College, University of London (largely built by Kathleen Booth).
- June 21 – World's first working program run on an electronic stored-program computer, the Manchester Baby (written by Tom Kilburn).
- July–October – Claude E. Shannon publishes "A Mathematical Theory of Communication" in Bell System Technical Journal, regarded as a foundation of information theory, introducing the concept of Shannon entropy and adopting the term Bit.

== History of science and technology ==
- December 17 – The original Wright Flyer goes on display in the Smithsonian Institution.

== Mathematics ==
- May – The Descartes snark (210 vertices) in graph theory is described by Bill Tutte writing as Blanche Descartes.

== Medicine and human sciences ==
- January 5 – The first Kinsey Report, Sexual Behavior in the Human Male, is published in the United States.
- April 7 – The World Health Organization is established by the United Nations.
- July 5 – The National Health Service begins functioning in the United Kingdom, giving the right to universal healthcare, free at point of use.
- Winter 1948/49 – Outbreak of Akureyri disease in Iceland.
- In psychology, Bertram Forer demonstrates the Barnum effect (that people tend to accept generalised descriptions of personality as uniquely applicable to themselves).
- Julius Axelrod and Bernard Brodie identify the analgesic properties of acetaminophen.

== Meteorology ==
- March 25 – Meteorologists at Tinker Air Force Base in Oklahoma City issue the world's first tornado forecast, for the second of the 1948 Tinker Air Force Base tornadoes.

== Physics ==
- April 1 – Physicists Ralph Asher Alpher and George Gamow publish the Alpher–Bethe–Gamow paper about the Big Bang.
- May 29 – Casimir effect predicted by Dutch physicist Hendrik Casimir.
- Herbert Fröhlich makes a key breakthrough in understanding superconductivity, at the University of Liverpool.
- Rosemary Brown discovers the kaon (or K meson particle).

== Technology ==
- June 18 – Columbia Records unveil the LP records developed by Peter Goldmark of CBS Laboratories.
- First modern long-span permanent box girder bridge completed, between Cologne and Deutz.

== Publications ==
- First publication of Norbert Wiener's Cybernetics: Or Control and Communication in the Animal and the Machine.
- Publication in Britain of the novel No Highway by former aeronautical engineer Nevil Shute, dealing with the effects of metal fatigue on aircraft.

== Awards ==
- Nobel Prizes
  - Physics – Patrick Maynard Stuart Blackett
  - Chemistry – Arne Wilhelm Kaurin Tiselius
  - Medicine – Paul Hermann Müller

== Births ==
- January 30 – Akira Yoshino, Japanese chemist, recipient of the Nobel Prize in Chemistry.
- March 1 – Alison Richard, English primatologist and academic.
- March 9 – László Lovász, Hungarian computer scientist.
- March 21 – Robert Watson, British atmospheric chemist.
- May – David Mabberley, English-born plant taxonomist.
- June 13 – Nina L. Etkin (died 2009), American anthropologist and biologist.
- June 28 – Kenneth Alan Ribet, American mathematician.
- July 20 – Martin Green, Australian solar cell researcher.
- July 27 – Stephen Westaby, English cardiac surgeon.
- August 4 – Giorgio Parisi, Italian theoretical physicist, recipient of the Nobel Prize in Physics.
- August 7 – James P. Allison, American immunologist, recipient of the Nobel Prize in Physiology or Medicine.
- August 25 – Nicholas A. Peppas, Greek chemical and biomedical engineer.
- August 29 – Robert S. Langer, American biomedical engineer.
- August 30 – Victor Skumin, Russian scientist, psychiatrist and psychologist; describes Skumin syndrome in 1978.
- September 2 – Christa McAuliffe, born Sharon Christa Corrigan (died 1986), American astronaut.
- October 29 – Frans de Waal, Dutch primatologist.
- October 31 – Mu-ming Poo, Chinese neuroscientist.
- December 30 – Randy Schekman, American cell biologist, recipient of the Nobel Prize in Physiology or Medicine.
- Margaret Allen, American cardiothoracic surgeon.
- Robert Plomin, American-born psychologist.

== Deaths ==
- January 30 – Orville Wright (born 1871), American pioneer aviator.
- May 26 – Sir George Newman (born 1870), English public health physician.
- June 10 – Philippa Fawcett (born 1868), English mathematician.
- June 21 – D'Arcy Wentworth Thompson (born 1860), Scottish biologist.
- December 12 – Marjory Stephenson (born 1885), English biochemist.
