= 1951 in archaeology =

Below are notable events in archaeology that occurred in 1951.

== Excavations ==
- c. January - Old Furnace, Coalbrookdale, England.
- Awwam temple near Ma'rib in Yemen, by Wendell Phillips of the American Foundation for the Study of Man (continues to 1952).
- Stanwick Iron Age Fortifications in North Yorkshire, by Mortimer Wheeler (continues to 1952).
- Hod Hill in Dorset, by Ian Richmond for the British Museum (continues to 1958).
- Tasghîmût fortress in Morocco, by Charles Allain and Jacques Meunié.
- Excavation of Chogha Zanbil in Iran by Roman Ghirshman begins.

== Explorations ==
- 1951–1952 - British Academy Middle Nile Expedition in Sudan led by O. G. S. Crawford.

== Finds ==
- May 12 - Gunnister Man found in a peat bog in Shetland.

== Events ==
- July - The term "Industrial archaeology" is first used in print in Britain.
- The Durrës Archaeological Museum is established in Durrës, Albania.

== Publications ==
- Social Evolution, by V. Gordon Childe (1892–1957), Australian-born archaeologist.
- The Prehistory of Wales, by W. F. Grimes (1905–1988), Welsh archaeologist.
- A Land, by Jacquetta Hawkes (1910–1996), British archaeologist.

== Births ==
- Keith Muckelroy, British maritime archaeologist (d. 1980)

== Deaths ==
- February 28 - Maud Cunnington, British archaeologist (b. 1869)
