= 1945 in philosophy =

1945 in philosophy

== Events ==
- January 1? - Jean-Paul Sartre refuses the Legion of Honour.

== Publications ==
- Aldous Huxley, The Perennial Philosophy
- Maurice Merleau-Ponty, Phenomenology of Perception (Phénoménologie de la perception)
- Karl Popper, The Open Society and Its Enemies
- The Israeli philosophy journal Iyyun is founded.

=== Philosophical fiction ===
- Hermann Broch, The Death of Virgil (Der Tod des Vergil)
- George Orwell, Animal Farm
- Jean-Paul Sartre, The Age of Reason (L'âge de raison)

== Births ==
- September 9 - Robert Alexy (died 2026)
- Philip Pettit

== Deaths ==
- February 1 - Johan Huizinga (born 1872)
- April 13 - Ernst Cassirer (born 1874)
- June 7 - Kitaro Nishida (born 1870)
- July 20 - Paul Valéry (born 1871)
- December 22 - Otto Neurath (born 1882)
