= 1951 in science =

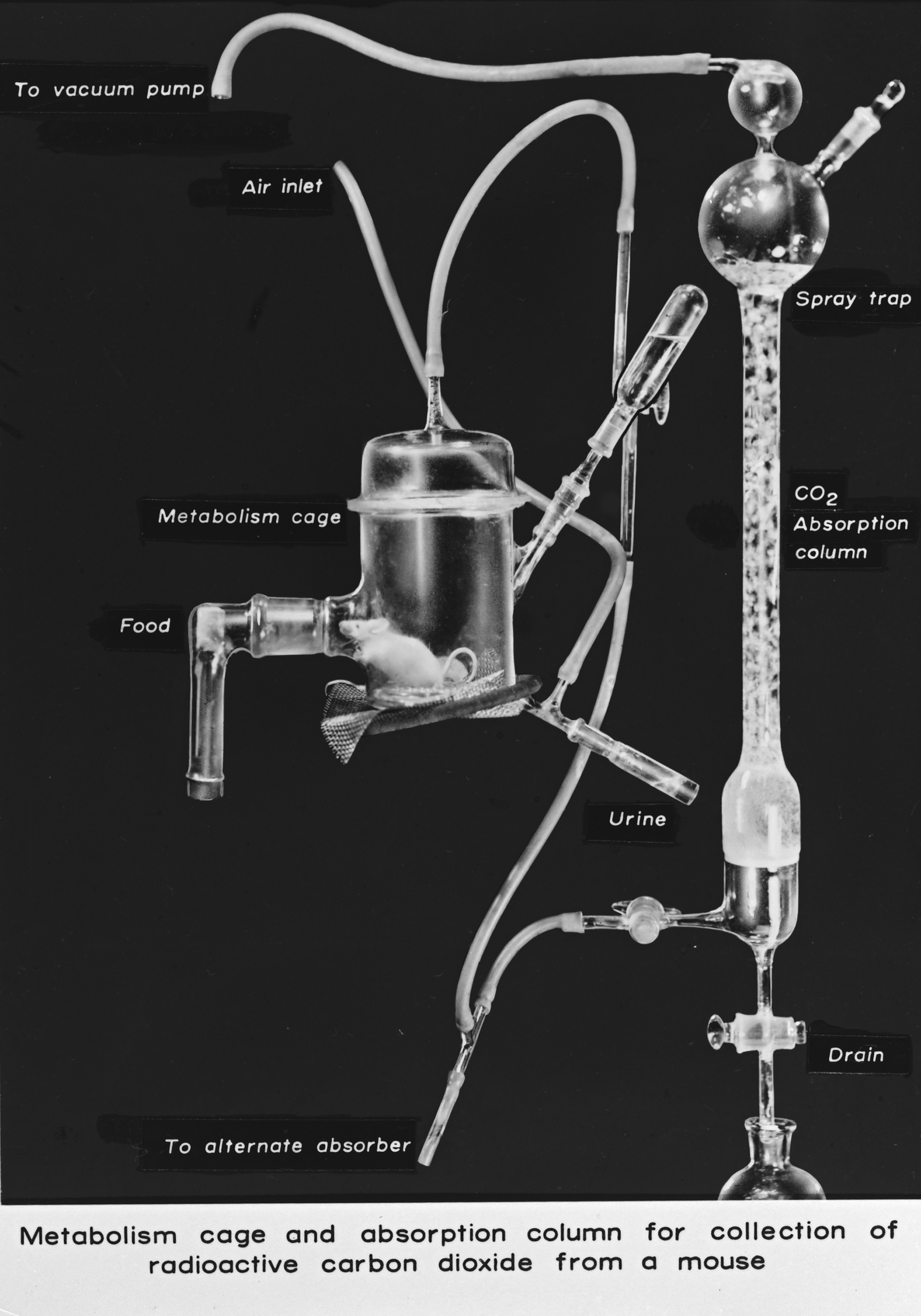

The year 1951 in science and technology involved some significant events, listed below.

== Astronomy and space science ==
- July 22 – Soviet space dogs Dezik and Tsygan become the first to enter space, in a 15-minute sub-orbital spaceflight from Kapustin Yar in an R-1 rocket, being safely parachuted back to earth.

== Biology ==
- Nesting pairs of the Bermuda petrel, thought to have been extinct for more than 300 years, are found.
- Niko Tinbergen publishes The Study of Instinct.

== Chemistry ==
- May 28 – Oliver H. Lowry submits his Lowry protein assay procedure for publication.
- October 15 – The progestin norethisterone, significant in creation of the combined oral contraceptive pill, is synthesized by Carl Djerassi, Luis E. Miramontes and George Rosenkranz at Syntex in Mexico City.

== Computer science ==
- February – Ferranti deliver their first Mark 1 computer to the University of Manchester (UK). It is the world's first commercially available general-purpose electronic computer.
- March 30 – Remington Rand delivers the first UNIVAC I computer to the United States Census Bureau. It is inaugurated on June 14.
- May 5 – The Ferranti NIMROD computer is presented at the Science Museum (London) during the Festival of Britain. It is designed exclusively to play Nim, using panels of lights, the first instance of a digital computer designed specifically to play a game.
- July – Maurice Wilkes introduces the concept of microprogramming.
- November 29 – LEO becomes the first computer to run a full commercial business application, for the British bakers J. Lyons and Co.
- EDVAC binary electronic stored program computer incorporating high speed delay-line memory begins operation at the United States Army's Ballistics Research Laboratory at Aberdeen Proving Ground.
- Publication of Sancti Thomae Aquinatis hymnorum ritualium varia specimina concordantiarum ... A first example of word index automatically compiled and printed by IBM punched card machines, a concordance to work by Thomas Aquinas produced by IBM under the direction of Roberto Busa, an early instance of the use of data processing machinery in humanities research.

== History of science and technology ==
- July – The term "Industrial archaeology" is first used in print in Britain.
- Karl Huber's biography of Leibniz is published posthumously.
- Hans Reichenbach's book The Rise of Scientific Philosophy is published.

== Mathematics ==
- Edward H. Simpson describes Simpson's paradox in statistics.

== Medicine ==
- August 15 – 1951 Pont-Saint-Esprit mass poisoning, a fatal outbreak, probably of ergotism, in southern France.
- Richard Asher describes Münchausen syndrome.
- The continental United States becomes malaria-free.

== Physics ==
- May 8 – Operation Greenhouse: The first thermonuclear weapon, developed by Edward Teller and Stanislaw Ulam, is tested in the "George" test on Enewetok Atoll in the Marshall Islands by the United States.

== Psychology ==
- Solomon Asch begins publication of his conformity experiments showing how group pressure can persuade an individual to conform to an obviously wrong opinion.
- The World Health Organization's report on maternal deprivation, Maternal Care and Mental Health, written by English psychologist John Bowlby, is published.

== Technology ==
- May – Carl A. Wiley publishes the concept of the solar sail.
- June – Carl A. Wiley invents synthetic aperture radar.
- July 4 – William Shockley of Bell Labs in the United States announces the invention jointly with John Bardeen and Walter Brattain of the grown-junction transistor. Also this year, General Electric and RCA develop the alloy-junction transistor.
- George Downing builds "The Rocket", the first surfboard with a removable fin.

== Organizations ==
- August 18 – Indian Institute of Technology Kharagpur inaugurated in West Bengal as the first of the Indian Institutes of Technology.
- c. September – James Watson joins Francis Crick under Max Perutz in the UK Medical Research Council's Unit for Research on the Molecular Structure of Biological Systems at the Cavendish Laboratory in the University of Cambridge led by Sir Lawrence Bragg.

== Awards ==
- Nobel Prizes
  - Physics – John Douglas Cockcroft, Ernest Thomas Sinton Walton
  - Chemistry – Edwin Mattison McMillan; Glenn Theodore Seaborg
  - Medicine – Max Theiler
- Copley Medal: David Keilin
- Wollaston Medal for Geology – Olaf Holtedahl

== Births ==
- January 19 – Shimon Sakaguchi, Japanese immunologist, recipient of Nobel Prize in Physiology or Medicine 2025.
- March 21 – Martin Sweeting, English microsatellite pioneer.
- March 26 – Carl Wieman, American physicist, recipient of Nobel Prize in Physics 2001.
- April 14 – Greg Winter, English biochemist, recipient of Nobel Prize in Chemistry 2018.
- May – Chen Saijuan, Chinese molecular biologist.
- May 15 – Frank Wilczek, American physicist, recipient of Nobel Prize in Physics 2004.
- May 18 – Ben Feringa, Dutch organic chemist, recipient of Nobel Prize in Chemistry 2016.
- May 26 – Sally Ride (died 2012), American physicist and astronaut.
- July 1 – Niels Krabbe, Danish ornithologist.
- July 4 – Susumu Kitagawa, Japanese chemist, recipient of Nobel Prize in Chemistry 2025.
- August 24 – Robin McLeod (died 2024), Canadian surgeon.
- September 14 – Duncan Haldane, English-born condensed-matter physicist, recipient of Nobel Prize in Physics 2016.
- September 18 – John Clark (died 2004), English molecular biologist.
- September 30 – Barry Marshall, Australian physician, recipient of Nobel Prize in Physiology or Medicine 2005.
- October 27 – Carlos Frenk, Mexican cosmologist.
- December 18 – Radia Perlman, American computer software designer and network engineer.

== Deaths ==
- January 7 – Lucien Cuénot (born 1866), French biologist.
- January 13 – Dorothea Bate (born 1878), British paleozoologist.
- January 30 – Ferdinand Porsche (born 1875), German automobile engineer.
- March 19 – Jacob Christiaan Koningsberger (born 1867), Dutch biologist and politician.
- April 6 – Robert Broom (born 1866), Scottish-born South African paleontologist.
- April 9 – Vilhelm Bjerknes (born 1862), Norwegian physicist and meteorologist.
- April 22 – Horace Donisthorpe (born 1870), English entomologist.
- April 26 – Arnold Sommerfeld (born 1868), German physicist.
- May 5 – John Flynn (born 1880), Australian medical services pioneer.
- May 16 – François Hussenot (born 1912), French aviation engineer, in aviation accident.
- October 4 – Henrietta Lacks (born 1921), African American source of the HeLa cell line.
- October 6 – Otto Fritz Meyerhof (born 1884), German-born physician and biochemist.
- December 11 – Christopher Addison, 1st Viscount Addison (born 1869), English anatomist and politician.
