= List of years in philosophy =

The following entries cover events related to the study of philosophy which occurred in the listed year or century.

== Centuries ==
- 11th century in philosophy
- 12th century in philosophy
- 13th century in philosophy
- 14th century in philosophy
- 15th century in philosophy
- 16th century in philosophy
- 17th century in philosophy
- 18th century in philosophy
- 19th century in philosophy
- 20th century in philosophy
- 21st-century philosophy

== Pre-1800 ==
1623 1656
1700 1743 1748 1751 1776 1781 1798

== 1800s ==
1800 1801 1809 1820 1828 1838 1844 1845 1847 1848 1854 1855 1859 1860 1861 1872 1889 1890 1898 1899

== 1900s ==
1900 1901 1902 1903 1904 1905 1906 1907 1908 1909
1910 1911 1912 1913 1914 1915 1916 1917 1918 1919
1920 1921 1922 1923 1924 1925 1926 1927 1928 1929
1930 1931 1932 1933 1934 1935 1936 1937 1938 1939
1940 1941 1942 1943 1944 1945 1946 1947 1948 1949
1950 1951 1952 1953 1954 1955 1956 1957 1958 1959
1960 1961 1962 1963 1964 1965 1966 1967 1968 1969
1970 1971 1972 1973 1974 1975 1976 1977 1978 1979
1980 1981 1982 1983 1984 1985 1986 1987 1988 1989
1990 1991 1992 1993 1994 1995 1996 1997 1998 1999

== 2000s ==
2000 2001 2002 2003 2004 2005 2006 2007 2008 2009
2010 2011 2012 2013 2014 2015 2016 2017 2018 2019
2020 2021 2022 2023 2024 2025 2026

== See also ==
- Outline of philosophy
- Timeline of philosophers
- List of years in science
- List of years in literature
- List of years in art

Please see the WikiProject page for formatting standards.

== General references ==
- Grun, Bernard (1991). The timetables of history (3rd revised ed.). Simon & Schuster. ISBN 0-671-74919-6 – via Internet Archive. Column C in the timetables has items related to philosophy.
- Stein, Werner [in German] (1976). Kulturfahrplan : Die wichtigsten Daten der Kulturgeschichte von Anbeginn bis 1975 [Cultural roadmap : Important dates in cultural history from the beginning to 1975] (in German). F. A. Herbig Verlagsbuchhandlung. ISBN 3-7766-0761-0 – via Internet Archive. The third column of the double-spread tables has items related to philosophy.
