= 2016 in philosophy =

List of years in philosophy
- … 2006; 2007; 2008; 2009; 2010; 2011; 2012; 2013; 2014; 2015; 2016; 2017; 2018; 2019; 2020; 2021; 2022; 2023; 2024; 2025; 2026 …
- Art; Archaeology; Architecture; Literature; Music; Philosophy; Science; +...

2016 in philosophy

== Events ==
- Edward N. Zalta is awarded the 2016 Barwise Prize.
- Charles Taylor wins the inaugural million-dollar Berggruen Prize for Philosophy, awarded to "a thinker whose ideas are of broad significance for shaping human self-understanding and the advancement of humanity," in a ceremony at the New York Public Library.
- Victor Caston, Anjan Chakravartty, Daniel Garber, and Richard Kraut are awarded Guggenheim Fellowships in philosophy.
- Christian Teichmann is presented a Hannah Arendt Award.
- Brian Skyrms receives the Hempel Award.
- Patrick Haggard is awarded the 2016 Jean Nicod Prize.
- Martha Nussbaum is awarded the Kyoto Prize in Arts and Philosophy.
- Brian Epstein is awarded the Lakatos Award.
- Victoria Pitts-Taylor receives the PSA Women's Caucus Prize in Feminist Philosophy of Science.
- Jonathan Sacks is awarded the Templeton Prize.
- Jan Sokol is awarded The VIZE 97 Prize.

== Publications ==
The following list is arranged alphabetically:

- Louis Althusser (Author), Étienne Balibar (Introduction & Contributor), Roger Establet (Contributor), Jacques Rancière (Contributor), Pierre Macherey (Contributor) – Reading Capital: The Complete Edition
- Jacques Derrida – Heidegger: The Question of Being and History
- Robert L. Holmes - Pacifism: A Philosophy of Nonviolence (Bloomsbury)
- Peter Singer, One World Now: The Ethics of Globalization (Yale University Press)
- Peter Sloterdijk, Foams: Spheres Volume III: Plural Spherology (2016)

== Deaths ==
Birth years link to the corresponding "[year] in philosophy" article:

- January 14 – Ellen Meiksins Wood, 73 (born 1942), American-born historian and political theorist.
- February 19 – Umberto Eco, 84 (born 1932), Italian philosopher (Kant and the Platypus) and novelist (The Name of the Rose)
- March 13 – Hilary Putnam, 89 (born 1926), American philosopher, mathematician and computer scientist.
