= 2017 in philosophy =

List of years in philosophy
- … 2007; 2008; 2009; 2010; 2011; 2012; 2013; 2014; 2015; 2016; 2017; 2018; 2019; 2020; 2021; 2022; 2023; 2024; 2025; 2026; 2027 …
- Art; Archaeology; Architecture; Literature; Music; Philosophy; Science; +...

2017 in philosophy

== Events ==
- August – Kialo is founded, a website for collaborative argument maps for a large variety of subjects including many philosophical questions and issues where different philosophical perspectives and claims are integrated into and scrutinized in one structure.

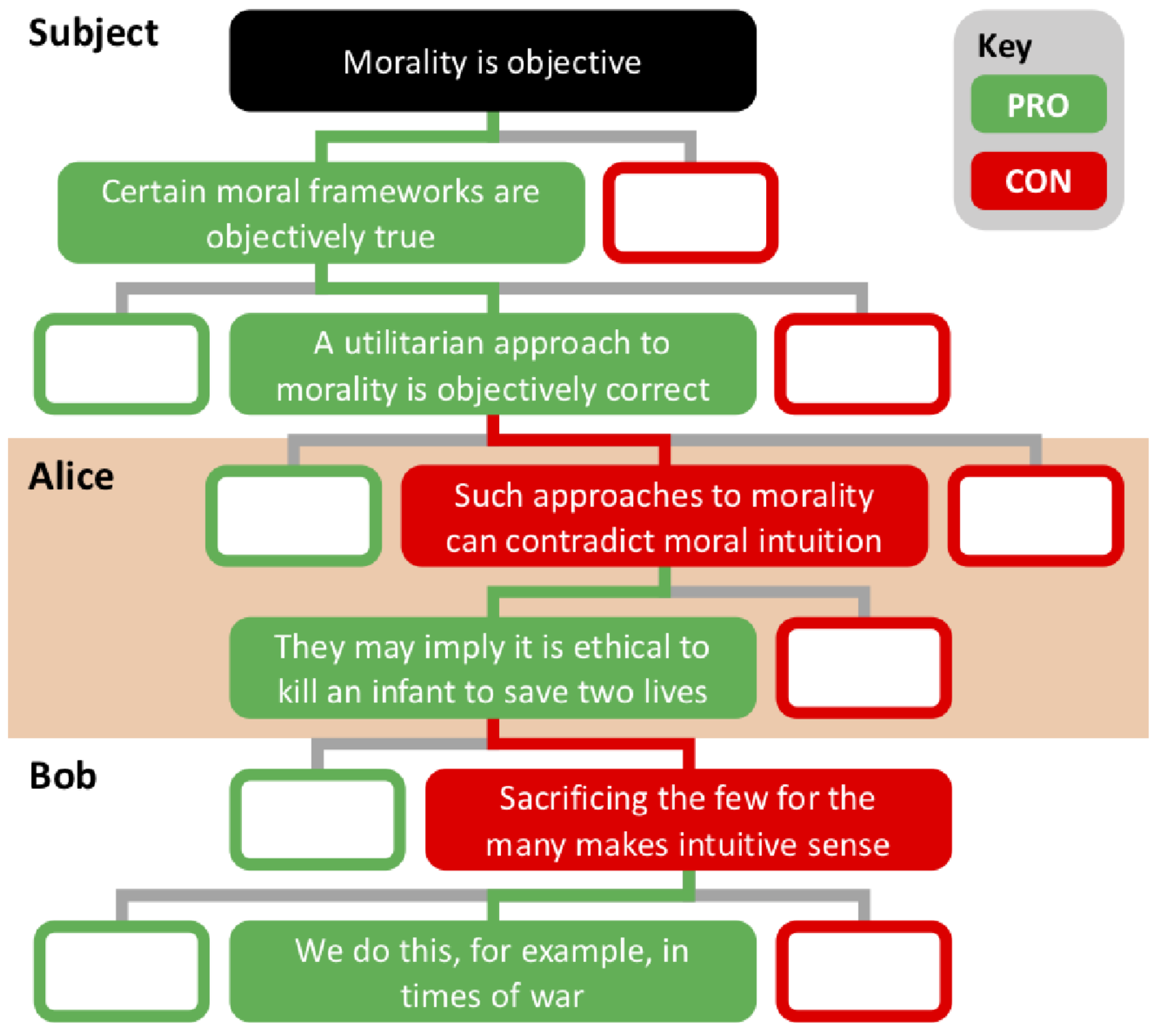
Kialo debate tree schema with an example path through it for thesis "Morality is objective"

- October 2 - Robert L. Holmes delivers his lecture "The Significance of Violence in Today's World" at the United Nations International Day of Nonviolence.
- December 15–16 – a conference in memory of Derek Parfit is held at Rutgers University, organized jointly with New York University.
- Hypatia transracialism controversy
- Jack Copeland is awarded the 2017 Barwise Prize.
- Onora O'Neill wins the 2017 Berggruen Prize.
- Emily Grosholz is awarded the Fernando Gil International Prize for the Philosophy of Science.
- Wolfram Groddeck is awarded the 2017 Friedrich Nietzsche Prize.
- Margaret Morrison and Michael Strevens are awarded Guggenheim Fellowships in philosophy.
- Étienne Balibar is presented a Hannah Arendt Award.
- Onora O'Neill is awarded the 2017 Holberg Prize.
- John Campbell is awarded the 2017 Jean Nicod Prize.
- Jan Assmann and Aleida Assmann are awarded the Karl Jaspers Prize.
- Craig Callender is awarded the Lakatos Award.
- Ruth Millikan is awarded the Nicholas Rescher Prize for Systematic Philosophy.
- Ruth Millikan is awarded the Rolf Schock Prize in Logic and Philosophy.
- Alvin Plantinga is awarded the Templeton Prize.

== Publications ==
The following list is arranged alphabetically:

- Katarzyna de Lazari-Radek & Peter Singer, Utilitarianism: A Very Short Introduction (Oxford University Press)
- Kate Manne, Down Girl: The Logic of Misogyny (Oxford University Press)
- Michael Ruse, On Purpose, (Princeton University Press).
- Kieran Setiya, Midlife: A Philosophical Guide, (Princeton University Press)
- George Sher, Me, You, Us (Oxford University Press)
- Peter Singer, (ed.), Does Anything Really Matter? Essays on Parfit on Objectivity (Oxford University Press).
- Jeremy Waldron, One Another's Equals: The Basis of Human Equality (Harvard University Press)

== Deaths ==
Birth years link to the corresponding "[year] in philosophy" article:

- January 1 – Derek Parfit, 75, British philosopher, specialist in personal identity, rationality, and ethics (born 1942).
- January 7 – John Deely, 74, American philosopher and semiotician (born 1942)
- January 9 – Zygmunt Bauman, 91, Polish sociologist and philosopher (born 1925).
- January 13 – Mark Fisher, 48, British writer, music journalist (The Wire, Fact) and cultural theorist whose most influential work is Capitalist Realism: Is there no alternative? (2009) (born 1968).
- February 1 – Tzvetan Todorov, 77, Bulgarian-French historian, philosopher, structuralist literary critic, sociologist, essayist and geologist (born 1939).
- February 17 – Tom Regan, 78, American philosopher, specialist in animal rights theory (born 1938).
- March 14 – André Tosel, 75, French Marxist philosopher (born 1941).
- April 22 – Hubert Dreyfus, 87, American philosopher and professor of philosophy at the University of California, Berkeley (born 1929).
- April 24 – Robert M. Pirsig, 88, American writer and philosopher (born 1928).
- May 15 – Karl-Otto Apel, 95, German philosopher and Professor Emeritus at the University of Frankfurt am Main (born 1922).
- October 1 – István Mészáros, 86, Hungarian-born Marxist philosopher, Professor Emeritus at the University of Sussex (born 1930).
- November 29 – Jerry Fodor, 82, American philosopher and cognitive scientist (born 1935).
