= 2020 in philosophy =

List of years in philosophy
- … 2010; 2011; 2012; 2013; 2014; 2015; 2016; 2017; 2018; 2019; 2020; 2021; 2022; 2023; 2024; 2025; 2026; 2027; 2028; 2029; 2030 …
- Art; Archaeology; Architecture; Literature; Music; Philosophy; Science; +...

2020 in philosophy

== Events ==
=== Planned events ===
- January 8-11 - the American Philosophical Association held its annual Eastern Division Meeting in Philadelphia, Pennsylvania.
- February 26-29 - the American Philosophical Association held its annual Central Division Meeting in Chicago, Illinois.
- The American Philosophical Association did not hold its annual Pacific Division Meeting in San Francisco, California as had previously been planned due to the pandemic.
- Aaron Sloman is awarded the 2020 Barwise Prize.
- Paul Farmer wins the 2020 Berggruen Prize.
- Sarah Buss, Robert Gooding-Williams, and Susanna Schellenberg are awarded Guggenheim Fellowships in philosophy.
- Griselda Pollock is awarded the 2020 Holberg Prize.
- Leda Cosmides and John Tooby are awarded the 2020 Jean Nicod Prize.
- Nicholas Shea is awarded the Lakatos Award.
- Dag Prawitz and Per Martin-Löf are awarded the 2020 Rolf Schock Prize in Logic and Philosophy.

== Publications ==
- Kyle Johannsen, Wild Animal Ethics (Routledge)
- Manel Pretel-Wilson, Utopics: The Unification of Human Science (Springer).
- Peter Sloterdijk, Making the Heavens Speak (Den Himmel zum Sprechen bringen) (Suhrkamp Verlag)

=== Planned publications ===
- Karl Ameriks, Kantian Subjects: Critical Philosophy and Late Modernity (Oxford University Press).
- Dimitria Electra Gatzia and Berit Brogaard (ed.), The Epistemology of Non-Visual Perception (Oxford University Press).
- John Gardner (d. 2019), Torts and Other Wrongs (Oxford University Press).
- Béatrice Longuenesse, The First Person in Cognition and Morality: The Spinoza Lectures (Oxford University Press).

== Deaths ==
- January 3 - Douglas N. Walton, Canadian philosopher and logician (b. 1942).
- January 5 - Colin Howson, British philosopher (b. 1945).
- January 9 - David Efird, American philosopher and Anglican priest (b. 1974).
- January 12 - Roger Scruton, English philosopher (b. 1944).
- January 17 - Emanuele Severino, Italian philosopher (b. 1929).
- February 15 - Jack Macintosh, philosopher known for his work in the history and philosophy of science, especially on Robert Boyle (b. 1934).
- February 25 - Mario Bunge, Argentine philosopher of science and physicist who was mainly active in Canada (b. 1919).
- June 21 - Hugh Mellor, British philosopher working primarily in metaphysics (b. 1938).
- June 28 - Eliot Deutsch, comparative philosopher (b. 1931).
- August 5 - Bernard Stiegler, French philosopher (b. 1952).
- November 20 - Judith Jarvis Thomson, American ethicist (b. 1929).
- November 22 - Raimo Tuomela, Finnish philosopher (b. 1940).
