= 2021 in philosophy =

List of years in philosophy
- … 2011; 2012; 2013; 2014; 2015; 2016; 2017; 2018; 2019; 2020; 2021; 2022; 2023; 2024; 2025; 2026; 2027; 2028; 2029; 2030; 2031 …
- Art; Archaeology; Architecture; Literature; Music; Philosophy; Science; +...

2021 in philosophy

== Events ==
- January 7-16: The American Philosophical Association held its annual Eastern Division meeting virtually.
- February 22-27: The American Philosophical Association held its annual Central Division meeting virtually.
- April 5-10: The American Philosophical Association held its annual Pacific Division meeting virtually.
- May: Robert L. Holmes was scheduled to address the United Nations General Assembly, however his lecture was cancelled due to the emergence of the COVID pandemic crises in New York City.
- Ben Goertzel is awarded the 2021 Barwise Prize.
- Peter Singer wins the 2021 Berggruen Prize.
- R. Lanier Anderson, Jennifer Lackey, and Roslyn Weiss are awarded Guggenheim Fellowships in philosophy.
- Jill Lepore is presented a Hannah Arendt Award.
- Béatrice Longuenesse receives a Hegel Prize.
- Martha Nussbaum is awarded the 2021 Holberg Prize.
- Frances Egan is awarded the 2021 Jean Nicod Prize.
- Anya Plutynski is awarded the Lakatos Award.
- Klaus Theweleit is awarded the Theodor W. Adorno Award.

== Deaths ==
- January 8 - John Corcoran, American logician, philosopher, mathematician, and historian of logic.
- January 9 - Margaret Morrison, Canadian philosopher who worked in the philosophy of science.
- February 20 - Richard Boyd
- March 6 - Jude Patrick Dougherty
- March 23 - Edmund Gettier, American philosopher best known for the Gettier problem.
- April 5 - Jon Michael Dunn
- April 7 - Kai Nielsen, American and Canadian moral philosopher, naturalist, and atheist.
- April 21 - Donald W. Sherburne
- April - Katherine Hawley
- April 29 - Andrew J. Reck
- May 9 - Jacques Bouveresse, French philosopher.
- May 23 - Frithjof Bergmann, German philosopher.
- June 8 - Joseph Margolis
- June 22 - Zbigniew Pełczyński, Polish-British political philosopher and academic.
- June 25 - Oliva Blanchette
- July 11 - Van A. Harvey
- July 13 - Jorge J. E. Gracia, Cuban-born American philosopher specializing in metaphysics, epistemology, the history of philosophy, and race/ethnicity/nationality.
- July 25 - Bob Moses, American educator and civil rights activist.
- August 8 - Sarah Broadie, British philosopher specializing in ancient philosophy, metaphysics, and ethics.
- August 23 - Jean-Luc Nancy, French philosopher.
- September 11 - Abimael Guzmán
- September 20 - Charles W. Mills
- October 22 - Lilli Alanen
- November 9 - Linda López McAlister
- November 13 - Gilbert Harman
- December 15 - bell hooks
- December 31 - Michael Inwood
