= 2012 in philosophy =

List of years in philosophy
- … 2002; 2003; 2004; 2005; 2006; 2007; 2008; 2009; 2010; 2011; 2012; 2013; 2014; 2015; 2016; 2017; 2018; 2019; 2020; 2021; 2022 …
- Art; Archaeology; Architecture; Literature; Music; Philosophy; Science; +...

2012 in philosophy

== Events ==
- Gayatri Chakravorty Spivak was awarded the Kyoto Prize in Arts and Philosophy for being "a critical theorist and educator speaking for the humanities against intellectual colonialism in relation to the globalized world".
- Ernst-Wolfgang Böckenförde was awarded the Sigmund Freud Prize.

== Publications ==
- Austin L. Hughes, The Folly of Scientism (2012)
- Christine Overall, Why Have Children? The Ethical Debate (2012)
- Ronald W. Dworkin, Psychotherapy and the Pursuit of Happiness (2012)

== Deaths ==
- January 1 - Frank Cioffi (born 1928)
- January 24 - Arild Haaland (born 1919)
- January 29 - J. O. Urmson (born 1915)
- February 9 - John Hick (born 1922)
- February 19 - Ruth Barcan Marcus (born 1921)
- February 19 - Frits Staal (born 1930)
- March 16 - Peter Serracino Inglott (born 1936)
- March 19 - Knut Erik Tranøy (born 1918)
- April 9 - Boris Parygin (born 1930)
- April 30 - Arturo Andrés Roig (born 1922)
- May 6 - Jean Laplanche (born 1924)
- May 15 - Peter Koslowski (born 1952)
- June 11 - Berthold Wulf (born 1926)
- June 13 - Roger Garaudy (born 1913)
- June 14 - Juha Sihvola (born 1957)
- June 15 - Alan Saunders (born 1954)
- August 13 - Hugo Adam Bedau (born 1926)
- June 24 - Claude Sumner (born 1919)
- July 18 - Robert Kurz (born 1943)
- August 27 - Leonard Linsky (born 1922)
- August 28 - Alfred Schmidt (born 1931)
- September 1 Ray Billington
- September 20 - Paul Pojman (born 1966)
- September 21 - Yehuda Elkana (born 1934)
- October 6 - J. J. C. Smart (born 1920)
- October 10 - Piotr Lenartowicz (born 1934)
- October 10 - Mark Poster (born 1941)
- October 13 - Tomonobu Imamichi (born 1922)
- October 20 - Paul Kurtz (born 1925)
- November 2 - Annette Baier (born 1929)
- December 6 - David Favrholdt (born 1931)
- December 29 - Henri Bortoft (born 1938)
- unspecified - Shunpei Ueyama (born 1921)
