= 1995 in philosophy =

List of years in philosophy
- … 1985; 1986; 1987; 1988; 1989; 1990; 1991; 1992; 1993; 1994; 1995; 1996; 1997; 1998; 1999; 2000; 2001; 2002; 2003; 2004; 2005 …
- Art; Archaeology; Architecture; Literature; Music; Philosophy; Science; +...

1995 in philosophy

== Events ==
- Habermas-Rawls debate
- Michael Dummett was awarded the Rolf Schock Prize in Logic and Philosophy "his penetrating discussion of Frege's philosophy and for his contributions to the theory of linguistic meaning among them his discussion of how the metaphysical dispute between realism and anti-realism is connected with the meaning-theoretical question of the validity of logical laws."

== Publications ==
- John Searle, The Construction of Social Reality, 1995
- John Brockman, The Third Culture, 1995

== Deaths ==
- January 7 - Murray Rothbard (born 1926)
- April 12 - Mou Zongsan (born 1909)
- April 20 - Milovan Đilas (born 1911)
- September 11 - Georges Canguilhem (born 1904)
- November 4 - Gilles Deleuze (born 1925)
- November 5 - Ernest Gellner (born 1925)
- December 25 - Emmanuel Lévinas (born 1906)
