= 2014 in philosophy =

List of years in philosophy
- … 2004; 2005; 2006; 2007; 2008; 2009; 2010; 2011; 2012; 2013; 2014; 2015; 2016; 2017; 2018; 2019; 2020; 2021; 2022; 2023; 2024 …
- Art; Archaeology; Architecture; Literature; Music; Philosophy; Science; +...

2014 in philosophy

== Events ==
- July 16-19 - The Charles S. Pierce International Centennial Congress was held at the University of Massachusetts Lowell in commemoration of the 100th anniversary of the death of Charles Sanders Peirce. According to the Charles S. Peirce Foundation, "the aim of the Centennial Congress is to advance scholarship on all aspects of Peirce's thought and biography, and to investigate the relevance and potential of his philosophy for the 21st century - for contemporary philosophical debates and beyond".
- September 25-27 - Faith and Reason: Themes from Swinburne was held at Purdue University in celebration of the life and works of Richard Swinburne. Various philosophers presented in the conference, some of whom include: Alvin Plantinga, Dean Zimmerman, Eleonore Stump, Laura Ekstrom, Marilyn McCord Adams, Nicholas Wolterstorff, Paul Draper and Peter van Inwagen.

== Publications ==
- Louis Althusser - On The Reproduction Of Capitalism: Ideology And Ideological State Apparatuses
- Diego Bubbio- Sacrifice in the Post-Kantian Tradition
- Sam Harris - Waking Up: A Guide to Spirituality Without Religion
- Robert L. Holmes - Basic Moral Philosophy (Cengage Learning)
- Lee Smolin & Roberto Mangabeira Unger - The Singular Universe and the Reality of Time
- Peter Sloterdijk - Globes: Spheres Volume II: Macrospherology
- Peter Unger, Empty Ideas: A Critique of Analytic Philosophy (Oxford University Press)
- Valtteri Viljanen - Spinoza's Geometry of Power

== Deaths ==
- January 5 - E. J. Lowe (born 1950)
- February 16 - Israel Scheffler (born 1923)
- March 5 - Luis Villoro (born 1922)
- March 14 - Ted Cohen (born unknown)
- April 21 - James Higginbotham (born 1941)
- May 13 - David Malet Armstrong (born 1926)
- October 2 - Fred Sommers (born 1923)
- November 17 - Patrick Suppes (born 1922)
- December 3 - Nathaniel Branden (born 1930)
