= 1988 in philosophy =

List of years in philosophy
- … 1978; 1979; 1980; 1981; 1982; 1983; 1984; 1985; 1986; 1987; 1988; 1989; 1990; 1991; 1992; 1993; 1994; 1995; 1996; 1997; 1998 …
- Art; Archaeology; Architecture; Literature; Music; Philosophy; Science; +...

1988 in philosophy

== Events ==
- Paul Thieme was awarded the 1988 Kyoto Prize in Arts and Philosophy for "he added immensely to our knowledge of Vedic and other classical Indian literature and provided a solid foundation to the study of the history of Indian thought".
- The Indian philosopher and writer Raja Rao was awarded the 1988 Neustadt International Prize for Literature.

== Publications ==
- Ernst Mayr, Toward a New Philosophy of Biology (1988)
- Stephen Hawking, A Brief History of Time (1988)
- Hans Moravec, Mind Children: The Future of Robot and Human Intelligence (1988)
- Jürgen Habermas, Postmetaphysical Thinking (1988)

== Deaths ==
- February 16 - Ye Shengtao (born 1894)
- June 23 - Liang Shuming (born 1893)
- June 26 - Hans Urs von Balthasar (born 1905)
