= 1999 in philosophy =

List of years in philosophy
- … 1989; 1990; 1991; 1992; 1993; 1994; 1995; 1996; 1997; 1998; 1999; 2000; 2001; 2002; 2003; 2004; 2005; 2006; 2007; 2008; 2009 …
- Art; Archaeology; Architecture; Literature; Music; Philosophy; Science; +...

1999 in philosophy

== Events ==
- John Rawls was awarded the Rolf Schock Prize in Logic and Philosophy from the Royal Swedish Academy of Sciences "for his book "A Theory of Justice", which has constituted a renewal of normative ethics and political philosophy and has in an essential way contributed to the methodology for normative ethics."

== Publications ==
- Ian Hacking, The Social Construction of What? (1999)
- Tim Berners-Lee, Weaving the Web (1999)

== Deaths ==
- February 8 - Iris Murdoch (born 1919)
- June 20 - Clifton Fadiman (born 1904)
