= 2007 in philosophy =

| List of years in philosophy |
- … 1997; 1998; 1999; 2000; 2001; 2002; 2003; 2004; 2005; 2006; 2007; 2008; 2009; 2010; 2011; 2012; 2013; 2014; 2015; 2016; 2017 …
- Art; Archaeology; Architecture; Literature; Music; Philosophy; Science; +...

2007 in philosophy

== Events ==
- The French philosopher André Gorz committed suicide together with his incurably ill wife, Dorine, on 22 September 2007 in Vosnon, France. The French news agency Agence France-Presse stated that "the couple were found by a friend side by side in their home southeast of Paris surrounded by letters written to close friends and relatives."

== Publications ==
- Ray Brassier, "Nihil Unbound: Enlightenment and Extinction" (2007)
- Lorraine Daston and Peter Galison, Objectivity (2007)
- Owen Flanagan, The Really Hard Problem: Meaning in a Material World (2007)
- Christopher Janaway, Beyond Selflessness: Reading Nietzsche's Genealogy (2007)
- Richard Kraut, What Is Good and Why: The Ethics of Well-Being (2007)
- John A. Leslie, Immortality Defended (2007)
- Quee Nelson, The Slightest Philosophy (2007)
- Charles Taylor, A Secular Age (2007)
- Alan Weisman, The World Without Us (2007)

=== Philosophical literature ===
- Ron Cooper, Hume's Fork (2007)

== Deaths ==
- March 6 - Jean Baudrillard (born 1929)
- April 28 - Carl Friedrich von Weizsäcker (born 1912)
- June 8 - Richard Rorty (born 1931)
- August 19 - Balthazar Barbosa Filho (born 1942)
- September 22 - André Gorz (born 1923)
- October 12 - Marianne Katoppo (born 1943)
