= 1985 in philosophy =

List of years in philosophy
- … 1975; 1976; 1977; 1978; 1979; 1980; 1981; 1982; 1983; 1984; 1985; 1986; 1987; 1988; 1989; 1990; 1991; 1992; 1993; 1994; 1995 …
- Art; Archaeology; Architecture; Literature; Music; Philosophy; Science; +...

1985 in philosophy

== Events ==
- Lewis White Beck contributes to the establishment of the North American Kant Society in the United States.

== Publications ==
- Nick Herbert, Quantum Reality: Beyond the New Physics (1985)
- Mou Zongsan, 圓善論 (Chinese; not yet translated into English) (1985)
- Bernard Williams, Ethics and the Limits of Philosophy (1985)
- Amartya Sen, Commodities and Capabilities (1985)
- Richard Clyde Taylor, Ethics, Faith and Reason (1985)
- Jürgen Habermas, The Philosophical Discourse of Modernity (1985)
- Between the Species (begins publication)

== Deaths ==
- January 19 - Eric Voegelin (born 1901)
- April 7 - Carl Schmitt (born 1888)
- June 12 - Helmuth Plessner (born 1892)
