= 1991 in philosophy =

List of years in philosophy
- … 1981; 1982; 1983; 1984; 1985; 1986; 1987; 1988; 1989; 1990; 1991; 1992; 1993; 1994; 1995; 1996; 1997; 1998; 1999; 2000; 2001 …
- Art; Archaeology; Architecture; Literature; Music; Philosophy; Science; +...

1991 in philosophy

== Events ==
- The philosophy magazine Philosophy Now was founded in 1991. According to the Philosophy Documentation Center it "has become the most widely read philosophy publication in the English-speaking world".

== Publications ==
- Richard Clyde Taylor, Virtue Ethics: An Introduction (1991)
- Colin Murray Turbayne, Metaphors for the Mind: The Creative Mind and its Origins (1991)

=== Monographies and essays ===
- Daniel Dennett, Consciousness Explained (1991)
- Bruno Latour, We Have Never Been Modern (1991)
- Robert B. Pippin, Modernism as a Philosophical Problem: On the Dissatisfactions of European High Culture (1991)
- Manuel de Landa, War in the Age of Intelligent Machines (1991)
- David Gelernter, Mirror Worlds (1991)
- Jürgen Habermas, Justification and Application: Remarks on Discourse Ethics (1991, English translation: 1993)
- Thomas Nagel, Equality and Partiality (1991)
- David Lewis, Parts of Classes (1991)

=== Philosophical fiction ===
- Robert M. Pirsig, Lila: An Inquiry into Morals (1991)
- Jostein Gaarder, Sophie's World (1991)

== Deaths ==
- January 23 - Northrop Frye (born 1912)
- June 11 - Wolfgang Stegmüller (born 1923)
- June 29 - Henri Lefebvre (born 1901)
- September 4 - Henri de Lubac (born 1896)
- November 27 - Vilém Flusser (born 1920)
