= 1994 in philosophy =

| List of years in philosophy |
- … 1984; 1985; 1986; 1987; 1988; 1989; 1990; 1991; 1992; 1993; 1994; 1995; 1996; 1997; 1998; 1999; 2000; 2001; 2002; 2003; 2004 …
- Art; Archaeology; Architecture; Literature; Music; Philosophy; Science; +...

1994 in philosophy

== Publications ==
- Harold Bloom, The Western Canon: The Books and School of the Ages, 1994
- John McDowell, Mind and World, 1994
- John Zerzan, Future Primitive and Other Essays, 1994
- Michio Kaku, Hyperspace, 1994
- Homi K. Bhabha, The Location of Culture, 1994
- Bernard Stiegler, Technics and Time, 1: The Fault of Epimetheus, 1994
- Cornel West, Race Matters, 1994
- Michael A. Smith, The Moral Problem, 1994

== Deaths ==
- February 11 - Paul Feyerabend (born 1924)
- June 2 - David Stove (born 1927)
- September 17 - Karl Popper (born 1902)
- November 30 - Guy Debord (born 1931)
