= 2001 in philosophy =

| List of years in philosophy |
- … 1991; 1992; 1993; 1994; 1995; 1996; 1997; 1998; 1999; 2000; 2001; 2002; 2003; 2004; 2005; 2006; 2007; 2008; 2009; 2010; 2011 …
- Art; Archaeology; Architecture; Literature; Music; Philosophy; Science; +...

2001 in philosophy

== Events ==
- Saul Kripke was awarded the Rolf Schock Prize in Logic and Philosophy "for his creation of the modal-logical semantics that bear his name and for his associated original and profound investigations of identity, reference and necessity".

== Publications ==
- Christopher Hitchens, Letters to a Young Contrarian (2001)
- Alain Finkielkraut, The Internet, The Troubling Ecstasy (2001)
- John A. Leslie, Infinite Minds: A Philosophical Cosmology (2001)
- Mario Bunge, Philosophy in Crisis: The Need for Reconstruction (2001)

=== Introductory Books ===
- Michael Williams, Problems Of Knowledge: A Critical Introduction to Epistemology (2001)

== Deaths ==
- January 5 - G. E. M. Anscombe (born 1919)
- February 9 - Herbert A. Simon (born 1916)
- February 24 - Claude Shannon (born 1916)
- April 24 - Paul Thieme (born 1905)
- May 28 - Francisco Varela (born 1946)
- June 28 - Mortimer J. Adler (born 1902)
- August 12 - Pierre Klossowski (born 1905)
- September 30 - John C. Lilly (born 1915)
- October 14 - David Lewis (born 1941)
- December 20 - Léopold Sédar Senghor (born 1906)
