= 2013 in philosophy =

List of years in philosophy
- … 2003; 2004; 2005; 2006; 2007; 2008; 2009; 2010; 2011; 2012; 2013; 2014; 2015; 2016; 2017; 2018; 2019; 2020; 2021; 2022; 2023 …
- Art; Archaeology; Architecture; Literature; Music; Philosophy; Science; +...

2013 in philosophy

== Events ==
- The 23rd World Congress of Philosophy was held from August 4 through August 10, 2013, in Athens, Greece. The 2013 World Congress of Philosophy is organized by the International Federation of Philosophical Societies in collaboration with the Greek Philosophical Society.
- The 200th anniversary of Søren Kierkegaard's birth was celebrated on May 5, 2013, in Copenhagen, Denmark. Conferences on Kierkegaard's philosophy and theology were held from May 6 through May 8, 2013 in Copenhagen, as well as numerous other cities throughout the world. The anniversary was organized by the International Kierkegaard Society with support from the University of Copenhagen.

== Publications ==
- Alvin Goldman, Joint Ventures: Mindreading, Mirroring, and Embodied Cognition (Oxford University Press)
- Robert L. Holmes, The Ethics of Nonviolence: Essays By Robert L. Holmes. Ed. Predrag Cicovaki (Bloomsbury)
- Saul Kripke, Reference and Existence: The John Locke Lectures (Oxford University Press)
- George Pattison, Kierkegaard and the Quest for Unambiguous Life (2013)
- Dimitris Vardoulakis, Sovereignty and Its Other (2013)

== Deaths ==
- January 13 – Diogenes Allen (born 1932)
- January 19 – Julia Penelope (born 1941)
- January 28 – Xu Liangying (born 1920)
- February 10 – David Hartman (born 1931)
- February 10 – Eugenio Trías Sagnier (born 1942)
- February 11 – Krzysztof Michalski (born 1948)
- February 14 – Ronald Dworkin(born 1931)
- February 16 – Grigory Pomerants (born 1918)
- April 10 – Raymond Boudon (born 1934)
- May 8 – Dallas Willard (born 1935)
- July 24 – Fred Dretske (born 1932)
- December 5 – Colin Wilson (born 1931)
- December 21 – Peter Geach (born 1916)
