= 1997 in philosophy =

List of years in philosophy
- … 1987; 1988; 1989; 1990; 1991; 1992; 1993; 1994; 1995; 1996; 1997; 1998; 1999; 2000; 2001; 2002; 2003; 2004; 2005; 2006; 2007 …
- Art; Archaeology; Architecture; Literature; Music; Philosophy; Science; +...

1997 in philosophy

== Events ==
- Dana Scott was awarded the Rolf Schock Prize in Logic and Philosophy from the Royal Swedish Academy of Sciences "for his conceptually oriented logical works, especially the creation of domain theory, which has made it possible to extend Tarski's semantical paradigm to programmering languages as well as to construct models of Curry's combinatory logic and Church's calculus of lambda conversion."

== Publications ==
- Hans Blumenberg, Die Vollzähligkeit der Sterne (published in German in 1997; not yet translated into English)
- John Searle, The Mystery of Consciousness (essay collection, 1997)
- Alan Sokal and Jean Bricmont, Fashionable Nonsense (1997)
- Manuel de Landa, A Thousand Years of Nonlinear History (1997)
- Vittorio Hösle, Morals and Politics (originally published in German as Moral und Politik in 1997, English translation: 2004)

=== Philosophical literature ===
- Adam Zagajewski, Mysticism for Beginners (1997)
- Greg Egan, Diaspora (1997)

== Deaths ==
- April 27 - Peter Winch (born 1926)
- May 2 - Paulo Freire (born 1921)
- June 7 - Lewis White Beck (born 1913)
- September 4 - Hans Eysenck (born 1916)
- November 5 - Isaiah Berlin (born 1909)
- November 6 - Josef Pieper (born 1904)
- December 14 - Owen Barfield (born 1898)
- December 26 - Cornelius Castoriadis (born 1922)
