= 2008 in philosophy =

| List of years in philosophy |
- … 1998; 1999; 2000; 2001; 2002; 2003; 2004; 2005; 2006; 2007; 2008; 2009; 2010; 2011; 2012; 2013; 2014; 2015; 2016; 2017; 2018 …
- Art; Archaeology; Architecture; Literature; Music; Philosophy; Science; +...

2008 in philosophy

== Events ==
- Charles Taylor was awarded the Kyoto Prize in Arts and Philosophy for the "construction of a social philosophy to pursue the coexistence of diverse cultures".
- Thomas Nagel was awarded the Rolf Schock Prize in Logic and Philosophy "for his systematic investigation of the tension between subjective and objective perspectives on reality and of how this tension gives rise to fundamental philosophical problems".

== Publications ==
- Hilary Putnam, Jewish Philosophy as a Guide to Life: Rosenzweig, Buber, Levinas, Wittgenstein (2008)
- Richard Swinburne, Was Jesus God? (2008)
- Raymond Geuss, Philosophy and Real Politics (2008)
- Kwame Anthony Appiah, Experiments in Ethics (2008)
- Philip Pettit, Made with Words: Hobbes on Language, Mind, and Politics (2008)
- Ronna Burger, Aristotle's Dialogue with Socrates: On the Nicomachean Ethics (2008)
- Alexander Nehamas, Only A Promise of Happiness: The Place of Beauty in a World of Art (2008)
- Benjamin Hale (editor), Philosophy Looks at Chess (2008)
- Charles Larmore, The Autonomy of Morality (2008)

== Deaths ==
- February 21 – Jay Rosenberg (born 1942)
- March 5 – Joseph Weizenbaum (born 1923)
- June 17 – Mark Sacks (born 1953)
- August 3 – Aleksandr Solzhenitsyn (born 1918)
- September 12 – David Foster Wallace (born 1962)
