= 2000 in philosophy =

List of years in philosophy
- … 1990; 1991; 1992; 1993; 1994; 1995; 1996; 1997; 1998; 1999; 2000; 2001; 2002; 2003; 2004; 2005; 2006; 2007; 2008; 2009; 2010 …
- Art; Archaeology; Architecture; Literature; Music; Philosophy; Science; +...

2000 in philosophy

== Events ==
- Paul Ricœur was awarded the Kyoto Prize in Arts and Philosophy for having "revolutionized the methods of hermeneutic phenomenology, expanding the study of textual interpretation to include the broad yet concrete domains of mythology, biblical exegesis, psychoanalysis, theory of metaphor, and narrative theory."

== Publications ==
- Antonio Negri and Michael Hardt, Empire (2000)
- Iris Marion Young, Inclusion and Democracy (2000)
- Onora O'Neill, Bounds of Justice (2000)
- Herlinde Pauer-Studer, Constructions of Practical Reason: Interviews on Moral and Political Philosophy (2000)
- Demetrios Vassiliades, Greeks in India: A Survey in Philosophical Understanding (2000)

== Deaths ==
- October 9 - Charles Hartshorne (born 1897)
- December 25 - Willard Van Orman Quine (born 1908)
