= 2010 in philosophy =

| List of years in philosophy |
- … 2000; 2001; 2002; 2003; 2004; 2005; 2006; 2007; 2008; 2009; 2010; 2011; 2012; 2013; 2014; 2015; 2016; 2017; 2018; 2019; 2020 …
- Art; Archaeology; Architecture; Literature; Music; Philosophy; Science; +...

An overview of 2010 in philosophy.

== Events ==
- Philosophy research centre and postgraduate programmes in Middlesex University relocate to Kingston University after a decision to close taught programmes and subsequent campaign to save them.

== Publications ==
- Kwame Anthony Appiah, The Honor Code: How Moral Revolutions Happen (2010)
- Anthony Kenny, A New History of Western Philosophy (2010)
- Bruno Latour, Coming out as a philosopher (2008 lecture for the reception of the Siegfried Unseld Preis, published in essay form in 2010)
- Magus Magnus, Heraclitean Pride (2010)
- Konrad Ott, Umweltethik zur Einführung (German, not yet translated into English) (2010)
- John Searle, Making the Social World: The Structure of Human Civilization (2010)
- Christian Smith, What Is a Person? (2010)
- Julian Young, Friedrich Nietzsche: A Philosophical Biography (2010)

== Deaths ==
- May 22 - Martin Gardner (born 1914)
- October 3 - Philippa Foot (born 1920)
