= 1916 in philosophy =

1916 in philosophy

== Publications ==
- R. G. Collingwood, Religion and Philosophy
- John Dewey, Democracy and Education: An Introduction to the Philosophy of Education
- Emma Goldman, "The Philosophy of Atheism", Mother Earth X:12 (February)

== Births ==
- February 7 - Colin Murray Turbayne, Australian-born philosopher (d. 2006)
- March 4 - Hans Eysenck, German-born psychologist (d. 1997)
- March 29 - Peter Geach, English philosopher (d. 2013)
- June 14 - Georg Henrik von Wright, Finnish philosopher (d. 2003)

== Deaths ==
- February 19 - Ernst Mach, Austrian physicist and philosopher (b. 1838)
- September 14 - Pierre Duhem, French philosopher of science (b. 1861)
