= 1656 in philosophy =

List of years in philosophy
- … 1646; 1647; 1648; 1649; 1650; 1651; 1652; 1653; 1654; 1655; 1656; 1657; 1658; 1659; 1660; 1661; 1662; 1663; 1664; 1665; 1666 …
- Art; Archaeology; Architecture; Literature; Music; Philosophy; Science; +...

1656 in philosophy

== Events ==
- Blaise Pascal writes the first of his Lettres provinciales.
- Baruch Spinoza is expelled from the Jewish community of Amsterdam.

== Publications ==
- James Harrington, The Commonwealth of Oceana.
- John Evelyn, An Essay on the First Book of T. Lucretius Carus de Rerum Natura, translation and commentary.
- Thomas Hobbes, the expanded English translation of his De Corpore (1655).

== Births ==
- 11 October - William Molyneux

== Deaths ==
- 8 September - Joseph Hall
- c. 1 October - John Bulwer
- 30 October - Ferruccio Baffa Trasci
- Kim Jip
