= 11th century in philosophy =

This is a list of philosophy-related events in the 11th century.

== Publications ==
Alberic of Monte Cassino wrote on the Eucharistic Controversy, opposing the views of Berengar of Tours. This was a significant moment in moving the dispute away from hermeneutics and philosophy towards a theological approach preferred by the prelates.

== Births ==
- Peter Damian (c. 1007–1072 or 1073). Reforming Benedictine] monk and cardinal in the circle of Pope Leo IX. A Doctor of the Church who often condemned philosophy.
- Anselm was born in either 1033 or 1034.
- Peter Abelard (1079–1142). French scholastic philosopher, theologian and preeminent logician.
- Judah Halevi (c.1075–1141), Spanish Jewish philosopher, poet and physician.

== Deaths ==
- Miskawayh (932–1030), Persian official and philosopher
- Avicenna (980–1037)
- Peter Damian (c. 1007–1072 or 1073) Reforming Benedictine monk and cardinal in the circle of Pope Leo IX; a Doctor of the Church who often condemned philosophy

== See also ==
- List of centuries in philosophy
