= Rolf Schock =

Swedish–American philosopher and artist

- Born: 5 April 1933; Cap-d'Ail, France
- Died: 5 December 1986 (aged 53); Berlin, Germany
- Occupations: Philosopher, writer

Rolf Schock (/ˈrɔːlf, ˈrɒlf ˈʃɒk/; 5 April 1933 – 5 December 1986) was a Swedish–American philosopher and artist.

== Biography ==
Schock was born at Cap-d'Ail on the French Riviera. His parents, who had left Germany, would eventually settle in the United States, where Schock would go on to obtain a bachelor's degree in geology at the University of New Mexico. After completing a bachelor of arts in 1955, he pursued studies in philosophy and logic from 1956 to 1960 at the University of California, Berkeley and then in University of California, Los Angeles, and in 1960 moved to Stockholm, Sweden, to specialize in theoretical philosophy at Stockholm University with a particular interest in free logic. He was awarded an intermediate post-graduate degree in 1964 and a Ph.D.

During the period 1964–1969 he also studied at the University College of Arts, Crafts and Design in Stockholm and he dedicated a lot of his time to painting and photography in addition to conducting research. He led a simple life as an independent scholar who was devoted to researching the field of logic and related areas in philosophy, and never held a permanent position, earning a living by temporary teaching assignments at universities and night-schools. For some years he was affiliated with the Royal Institute of Technology in Stockholm, where he taught a series of courses.

In 1986 Schock was killed in an accident in Berlin. To much surprise he left a large estate. Schock bequeathed half of the funds for prizes in the arts and sciences, and beginning in 1993, Schock Prizes (Schockprisen) instituted by his will are awarded every two or three years.

In his later life Schock criticized Albert Einstein's theory of relativity.

== Selected publications ==
- Logics Without Existence Assumptions (1968)
- New Foundations for Concept Theory (1969)
- The Inconsistency of the Theory of Relativity (1981)
- On the Nature of Time (1983)
