= David Favrholdt =

Danish philosopher

David Favrholdt (24 April 1931 – 6 December 2012) was a Danish philosopher, educated with M.A.s in psychology and philosophy and later Dr. Phil. from Copenhagen University. He is one of few Danes to be included in the International Who's Who.

In 1958 he got a gold medal for his thesis on the concept of consciousness at the University of Aarhus. He was employed as Professor in 1966 by University of Southern Denmark until his retirement, and Professor Emeritus afterwards. He became a member of the Academia Europaea in 1989, and a member of the Royal Danish Academy of Sciences in 1976. He was editor of Symposium from 1968 to 1978 and the Danish Yearbook of Philosophy from the 1985 to 1991. He has been a member of the National Committee of the International Union of History and Philosophy of Science since 1982 and chairman of the union from 1990 to 1998. Moreover, he won Fyens Stiftstidende's research prize in 1972.

== Bibliography ==
- An Interpretation and Critique of Wittgenstein's Tractatus, Munksgaard, 1964.
- Filosofi og samfund, Gyldendal, 1968.
- Bevidsthedsproblemet i Harald Høffdings filosofi, Det Kgl. Danske Videnskabernes Selskab, Historisk-Filosofiske Meddelelser 44, 4, 1969.
- Kinesisk Filosofi, Gyldendal, 1971.
- Synderegisteret og andre medskyldige fortællinger, Schønberg, 1973. (Filosofi fiktion).
- Lenin - Hans filosofi og verdensanskuelse, Gad, 1978.
- Menneskeopfattelsen, af David Gress, Ole Jensen, M. Pahuus, Hårby, 1980.
- Matematikundervisning. Red. af J. Bjørneboe, G. Nissen og D. Favrholdt, Aarhus Universitetsforlag, 1988.
- Niels Bohr's Philosophical Background. Det Kgl. Danske Videnskabernes Selskab, Historisk-Filosofiske Meddelelser, 1992.
- Studier i Niels Bohrs filosofi, Odense Universitets Forlag, 1994.
- Erkendelsesteori - Problemer og argumenter, Odense Universitetsforlag, 1994.
- Kritisk belysning af jeg'ets ontologi (red.), Odense Universitetsforlag, 1994.
- Knivene blinker. af David Favrholdt & Marianne Nathan Wandall, Rhodos, 1997.
- Fra Egtvedpigen til Folketinget. Et festskrift til Hendes Majestæt Dronning Margrethe II ved regeringsjubilæet 1997. Red. af Erik Dal, David Favrholdt og Poul Lindegård Hjorth, Det Kgl. Danske Videnskabernes Selskab, 1997.
- Filosofisk Codex - Om begrundelsen af den menneskelige erkendelse. Gyldendal, 1999.
- Hvad er tid? (red.), Gyldendal, 1999.
- Niels Bohr: Collected Works, Volume 10. Complementarity Beyond Physics (1928–1962), Kinesisk Udgave, 2000
- Æstetik og Filosofi - Seks Essays, Høst & Søn, 2000.
- Som kongerne bød. Fra trelleborge til enevælde. Festskrift til Hendes Majestæt Dronning Margrethe II i anledning af tresårsdagen 16. April 2000, Red. af David Favrholdt, Pia Grüner & Flemming Lundgreen-Nielsen, Det Kgl. Danske Videnskabernes Selskab, 2000.
- Spaltningen. Niels Bohr og Werner Heisenberg i Videnskab og Politik, Lindhardt og Ringhof, København, 2005.
- Farlige tanker - forskning under hammeren, Husets Forlag, 2005.
- Erkendelse - Grundlag og gyldighed, Aarhus Universitetsforlag, 2008.
- Filosoffen Niels Bohr, Informations Forlag, 2009.

== Articles ==
- Samtlige artikler om filosofi og psykologi, Hirschsprungs Konversations Leksikon, bd. 1- 5, Hirschsprungs forlag, 1962-1965.
- Samtlige artikler om filosofi og psykologi, Focus Leksikon, Gjellerup, 1968.
- "Niels Bohr and Danish Philosophy", Danish Yearbook of Philosophy. Vol. 13, 1976, pp. 206–220.
- "On Høffding and Bohr. A Reply to Jan Faye." Danish Yearbook of Philosophy. Vol. 16., 1979, pp. 73–77.
- "The Cultural Background of the Young Niels Bohr." Rivista di Storia della Scienza, Vol. 2, n. 3. Roma-Napoli 1985, pp. 445–461.
- "Niels Bohrs filosofi". i Favrholdt, Kalckar, Kristensen, Mottelsen og Rüdinger: Niels Bohr og den moderne atomfysik. Det Kgl. Danske Videnskabernes Selskab, København, 1985, pp. 41–59.
- "Bohr og fædrelandet" i Epoke, nr. 4, 1985, pp. 2–9.
- "København og atomfysikken", Slagmark, nr. 11, årg. 1988, pp. 75–86.
- "Niels Bohr og realisme-begrebet." Gamma nr. 72, Niels Bohr Institutet, September 1988, pp. 3–16.
- "Om forholdet mellem filosofi og kvantefysik." Philosophia, årg. 18, nr. 3-4, 1989, pp. 101–118.
- "Filosoffen Niels Bohr." Forskning og Samfund, årg. 1989, nr. 5, pp. 12–15.
- "Remarks on the Bohr-Høffding Relationship." Studies in History and Philosophy of Science, Vol. 22, No 3, Cambridge, pp. 399–414. 1991.
- "Niels Bohr's Views Concerning Language." Semiotica 94 - 1/2, Indiana University, Walter de Gruyter 1993, pp. 5 – 34.
- "Niels Bohr and Realism." in J. Faye and H.J. Folse (eds.): Niels Bohr and Contemporary Philosophy, Boston Studies in the Philosophy of Science, Vol. 153, Kluwer, 1994, pp. 77–96.
- "Niels Bohrs syn på sprog og beskrivelse." i Claus Emmeche: Kompendium i videnskabsteori. Niels Bohr Institutet, 14 s. 1996.
- "Subjekt-objekt problemet." i Gamma. Niels Bohr Institutet, Kbh. 1997.
