= 1820 in philosophy =

== Publications ==
- Thomas Brown - Lectures on the Philosophy of the Human Mind
- Georg Wilhelm Friedrich Hegel - Grundlinien der Philosophie des Rechts

== Births ==
- 22 January - James Hutchison Stirling, English philosopher (died 1909)
- 27 April – Herbert Spencer, English philosopher and sociologist (died 1903)
- 23 June – Friedrich Hermann Semmig, German author and philosopher (died 1897)
- 28 November – Friedrich Engels, German revolutionary, political economist, philosopher, industrialist, and military historian (died 1895)

== Deaths ==
- 24 March – Jean-Baptiste-René Robinet, French philosopher (born 1735)
- 2 April – Thomas Brown, Scottish philosopher and doctor (born 1778)
- 20 July – Mattias Fremling, Swedish philosopher (born 1745)
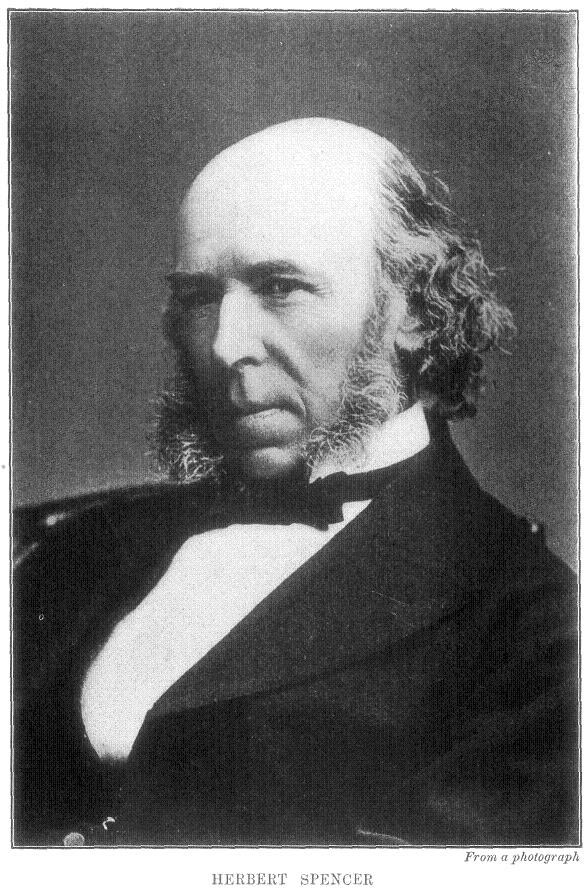
Herbert Spencer
1820-1903

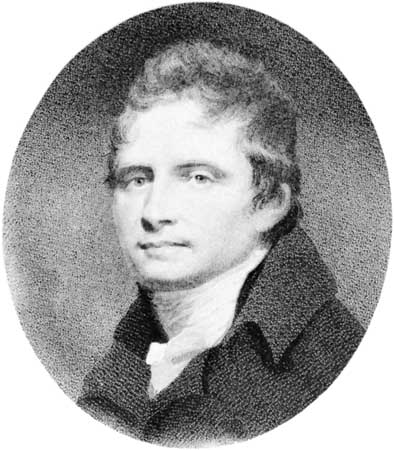
Thomas Brown
1778-1820

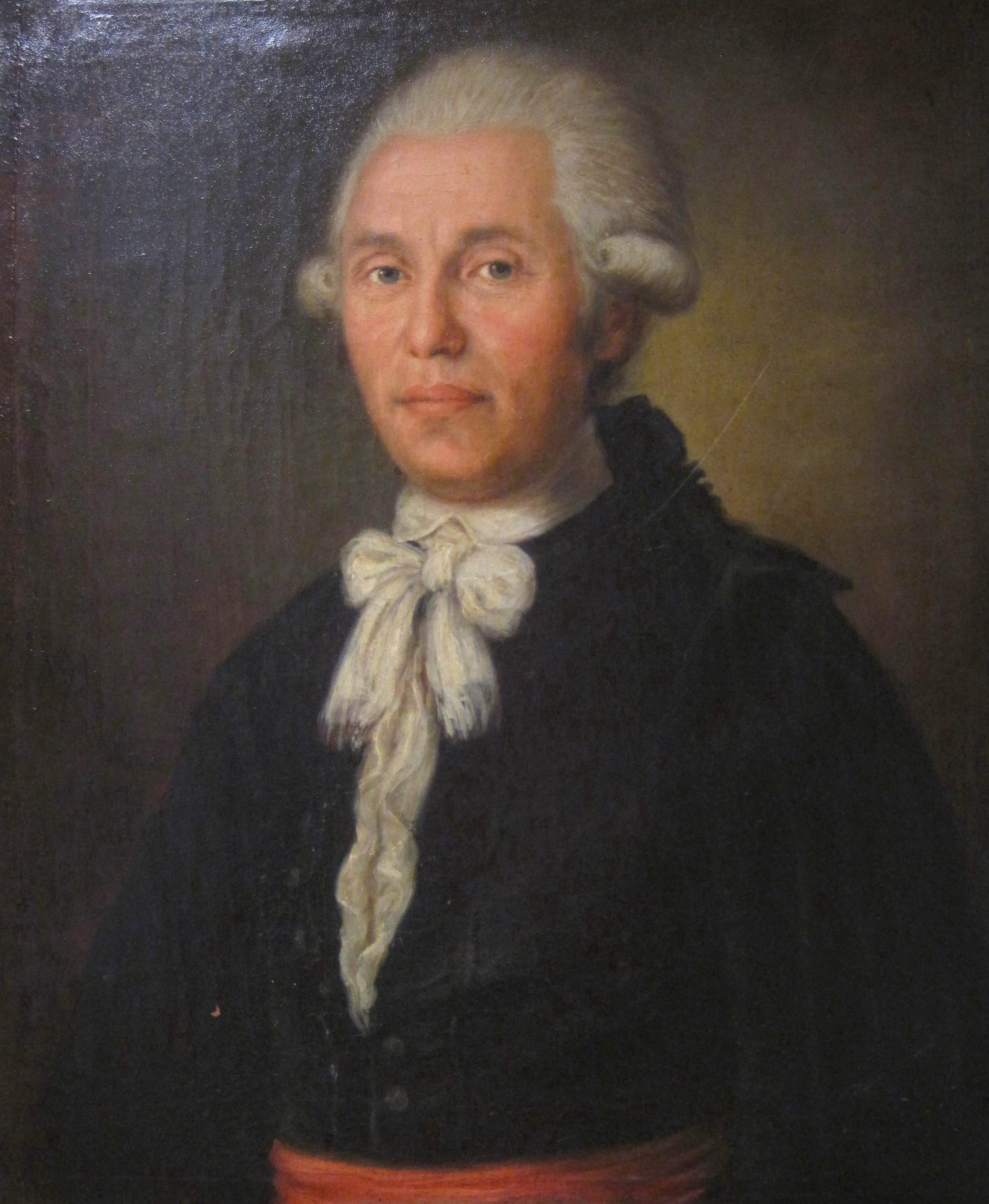
Mattias Fremling
1745-1820
