= 1801 in philosophy =

1801 in philosophy

== Births ==
- February 1 – Émile Littré (died 1881)
- April 5 – Vincenzo Gioberti (died 1852)
- April 19 - Gustav Fechner (died 1887)
- June 15 – Carlo Cattaneo (died 1869)
- August 10 – Christian Hermann Weisse (died 1866)
- August 28 – Antoine Augustin Cournot (died 1877)
- October 15 – Rifa'a al-Tahtawi (died 1873)
- December 4 – Karl Ludwig Michelet (died 1893)

== Deaths ==
- March 25 - Novalis (born 1772)
