= Hume's Fork (novel) =

2007 novel

- Author: Ron Cooper
- Publisher: Bancroft Press
- Publication date: March 2007
- ISBN: 1-890862-50-9

Hume's Fork is a satirical novel by Ron Cooper, published by Bancroft Press in March 2007.

== Summary ==
Hume's Fork is a novel about a philosophy professor named Legare "Greazy" Hume. He attends a conference in Charleston, South Carolina, with his eccentric colleague Saul Grossman and has to stay, much to his annoyance, with his family. A professional wrestling tournament takes place in Charleston at the same time, and soon the wrestlers philosophize while the philosophers begin to act like wrestlers. Hume works through philosophical problems while facing his own identity crisis.

The title comes from a "Hume's fork", a distinction made by the 18th-century British philosopher David Hume while also referring to several personal choices that Legare Hume must make.

== Reception ==
This novel was well received by critics. American novelist and philosopher and MacArthur Fellow Rebecca Goldstein called it a "mix of zaniness and erudition, satire and insight ... as delicious as it is original." American novelist Ron Rash said it "is one of the funniest novels I have read in a long time." American philosopher Robert Solomon said the "book reminded [him] of David Lodge's Small World: An Academic Romance, with a philosophical twist." The writer Katherine Ramsland described it as "Sideways meets Socrates".
