= Presumptive inclusion =

Inclusion by default

Presumptive inclusion is the idea that something should first be presumed to be included, and only omitted after the fact if justified. It has common uses in democracy and medicine.

== Democratic usage ==
Democratic theorists, especially those hoping to achieve something closer to universal suffrage, often support some form of presumptive inclusion, where the legal system would protect the voting rights of all subjects by default unless the government can clearly prove that disenfranchisement of a particular group or person is necessary. One example where the term has gotten some usage is in the arguments in favor of children and youth suffrage, where Eric Wiland argues, "Children should have the right to vote unless there is a good reason to disenfranchise them."

=== Analogies ===
Innocent until proven guilty is a principle where one's freedom is a right that must be disproven beyond a reasonable doubt before it is taken away. Similarly, voting could be seen as such a right that the government must meet a high bar (how high is disputed) before revoking it for any individual.

Freedom of speech also has very strong protections in democracies, with very few limitations. Voting has been described as speech by opponents to compulsory voting, who argue that it could entail compelled speech.

=== Implications ===
In practice, this could mean that the same standards that qualify adults as competent to vote could be extended by default to kids, allowing youth and children to vote. In addition, many more (if not all) residents could be enfranchised.

== See also ==
- Democratization
- Non-citizen suffrage
- Suffrage
