= Colin Howson =

British philosopher (1945–2020)

Colin Howson (4 June 1945 – 5 January 2020) was a British philosopher. He was Professor of Philosophy at the University of Toronto, where he joined the faculty on 1 July 2008. Previously, he was Professor of Logic at the London School of Economics. He completed a PhD on the philosophy of probability in 1981. In the late 1960s he had been a research assistant of Imre Lakatos at LSE. He died on 5 January 2020.

== Work ==
Howson's research interests included philosophy of science, logic, and foundations of probability. He was President of the British Society for the Philosophy of Science from 2003-2005. His book, Scientific Reasoning: The Bayesian Approach (with Peter Urbach) is considered the canonical philosophical defense of Bayesian reasoning.

Professor Howson was married to Margaret Morrison, a Canadian philosopher of science who was also a professor of philosophy at the University of Toronto.

== Publications ==
=== Books ===
- Hume's Problem: Induction and the Justification of Belief, (Oxford University Press, 2000); ISBN 978-0-19-825038-8 Peter Lipton in the British Journal for the Philosophy of Science describes the book as "Delivered with pace and consistent intelligence" and suggests that it "covers a great deal of ground, including Hume's sceptical argument, the new riddle of induction, naturalised epistemology, reliabilism, scientific realism, deductivism, objective chances and Hume on miracles, all from a Bayesian perspective...often provocative and repeatedly enlightening."
- Scientific Reasoning: the Bayesian Approach, (with Peter Urbach), Open Court Publishing Company, 1989; 2nd ed 1993; 3rd ed 2005 ISBN 978-0-8126-9578-6 - reviewed e.g. here
- Objecting to God, (Cambridge University Press, 2011); ISBN 978-0-521-18665-0. The growth of science and a correspondingly scientific way of looking at evidence have for the last three centuries slowly been gaining ground over religious explanations of the cosmos and mankind's place in it. However, not only is secularism now under renewed attack from religious fundamentalism, but it has also been widely claimed that the scientific evidence itself points strongly to a universe deliberately fine-tuned for life to evolve in it. In addition, certain aspects of human life, like consciousness and the ability to recognise the existence of universal moral standards, seem completely resistant to evolutionary explanation. In this book Colin Howson analyses in detail the evidence which is claimed to support belief in God's existence and argues that the claim is not well-founded. Moreover, there is very compelling evidence that an all-powerful, all-knowing God not only does not exist but cannot exist, a conclusion both surprising and provocative.

=== Articles ===
His articles include:

- 'Evidence and Confirmation', and 'Induction and the Uniformity of Nature', A Companion to the Philosophy of Science, ed. W H Newton-Smith, Blackwell (2000)
- 'The Logic of Personal Probability', The Foundations of Bayesianism, eds. D. Corfield and J. Williamson, Dordrecht: Kluwer, 137-161 (2001)
- 'Bayesianism in Statistics', in Bayes's Theorem, ed. Richard Swinburne, The British Academy, Oxford: Oxford University Press, 39-71 (2002)
- 'Bayesian Evidence', in Observation and Experiment in the Natural and Social Sciences, ed. M Galavotti, Boston Studies in the Philosophy of Science, Dordrecht: Kluwer, 301-321 (2003)
- 'Probability and Logic', Journal of Applied Logic, 1, 151-165 (2003)
- 'Why Are We Here?', Short Letters to The Times, Times Books, London: Harpercollins, 167 (2003)
- 'Ramsey's Big Idea', "Frank P. Ramsey. Critical Reassessment", ed. M.J. Frapolli, Thoemmes-Continuum
