= Christine Overall =

Canadian philosopher

Christine Overall FRSC (born 1949) is a Canadian philosopher specialising in feminist theory and applied ethics. She currently holds a Research Chair at Queen's University. Her books include Aging, Death, and Human Longevity: A Philosophical Inquiry, which was awarded the 2006 Abbyann D. Lynch Medal in Bioethics, and Why Have Children? The Ethical Debate. In 1998, she was elected a Fellow of the Royal Society of Canada.
