= Johanna Meehan =

American philosopher (1956–2024)

- Born: February 1, 1956
- Died: January 8, 2024 (aged 67)
- Occupations: Philosopher; academic; author

Academic background
- Education: BA., Philosophy; MA., Philosophy; PhD., Philosophy
- Alma mater: Brandeis University; Boston University
- Thesis: An Analysis and Defense of a Communicative Theory of Ethics

Johanna Meehan (February 1, 1956 – January 8, 2024) was an American philosopher, academic and author. She was McCay-Casady Professor of Humanities and Philosophy at Grinnell College.

Meehan's research primarily focused on critical theory, psychoanalysis, feminist theory, self-development, and Hannah Arendt. She authored and edited the book Feminists Read Habermas: Gendering the Subject of Discourse. She received the Grinnell College Harris Fellowship in 1993 to conduct research on male and female ego development.

== Education and early career ==
Meehan graduated with a bachelor's degree in Philosophy from Brandeis University in 1977 and began her career at Boston University as an instructor in 1979. In 1983, she pursued a master's degree in philosophy from Boston University while concurrently instructing at the University of Massachusetts in 1983, Bates College in 1986, and later Brandeis University in 1988. During this time, she studied with Jürgen Habermas after receiving a DAAD scholarship in 1985. She subsequently served as an instructor at the University of Massachusetts and Emerson College and obtained a Ph.D. in philosophy from Boston University in 1989.

== Career ==
Meehan continued her academic career as an assistant professor of philosophy at Grinnell College in 1990, later appointed to associate professor in 1997 and full Professor in 2006. She became the McCay-Casady Professor of Humanities and Philosophy at Grinnell College in 2021.

In 2004, Meehan became the Reviewer for the External Personnel at Wabash College, concurrently serving as the Chair of the Committee for the Iowa Philosophical Society at the University of Iowa. Subsequently, in 2015, she served as Chair of the Humanities Division and was also in the Executive Council for 2015 and 2016.

Meehan served on the Society for Phenomenology and Existential Philosophy’s Committee on the Status of Women from 1999 to 2001.

== Research ==
Meehan contributed to the field of philosophy by studying feminist philosophy, psychoanalysis, and the mutual understanding and development of the self that starts during infancy and continues throughout life. Her later writing focused on the nature of the self in light of postmodernism, race, and gender and the literature on the nature of biology and child and infant development.

== Works ==
Meehan authored a book on feminism and gender discourse in philosophy. In the book Feminists Read Habermas: Gendering the Subject of Discourse she presented a collection of essays where Jürgen Habermas' discourse theory has been discussed through different feminist perspectives.

=== Feminist theory ===
Meehan studied feminist theory throughout her career. She discussed how Habermas' emphasis on the intersubjective formation of subjectivity and the rational nature of normative claims is valuable for feminist theory but highlighted the need for feminists to challenge his reduction of subjectivity to language and rationality and to maintain distinctions between morality and legality. She also critiqued Butler and Benhabib's models of the self, arguing that their existing models fail to adequately capture the ontogeny of the self and proposed a new model based on the Developmental Systems Theory.

=== Critical theory ===
Meehan looked into critical theory in philosophy. She argued that Jürgen Habermas focuses on children's cognitive progression from conventional to post-conventional morality through discursive justifications while overlooking the profound impact of intersubjective identity formation, highlighting the significance of power dynamics in shaping norms and moral reasoning. Further examining Habermas's discourse ethics, she showcased how it reconciled the criticisms of neo-Kantianism, addressing concerns raised by both "communitarian" critics and feminist advocates of the "ethics of care," thereby offering an alternative to the dichotomy between the "right" and the "good" in moral theory.

Meehan emphasized the potential of Amy Allen's work in The Politics of Our Selves, in bridging the gap between Habermas' normative insights and Foucault's psychoanalytic discourse on the impact of power on subject formation. She contended that despite Arendt's aversion to psychology, her political theories resonate with Jessica Benjamin's psychoanalytic perspective, offering a nuanced understanding of the self that transcends postmodern deconstruction and liberal subjectivity. In addition, she argued that, for justice and liberation, postmodern emphasis on difference must evolve into a Hegelian solidarity, criticizing Derrida, Iris Marion Young, and Linda Nicholson while advocating for a reconstituted concept of human nature grounded in enduring solidarity for the united struggle.

=== Psychological development ===
Meehan researched the psychological development of infants and their subsequent attachment disorders. She examined attachment disorders in infants, providing a description and reflection on the understanding of children with attachment disorders, while exploring the significant impact of affective and psychological relationships on the development of socially and morally important relational abilities.

== Death ==
Meehan died on January 8, 2024, at the age of 67.

== Bibliography ==
=== Book ===
- Feminists Read Habermas: Gendering the Subject of Discourse (1995) ISBN 9780415754163

=== Selected articles ===
- Meehan, J. (2002). Arendt and the Shadow of the Other. International journal of philosophical studies, 10(2), 183–193.
- Meehan, J. (2004). Review Essay: Feminism, Critical Theory, and Power. Philosophy & Social Criticism, 30(3), 375–382.
- Meehan, J. (2013). Autonomy, recognition, and respect: Habermas, Benjamin, and Honneth. In Feminists Read Habermas (RLE Feminist Theory) (pp. 231–246). Routledge.
- Meehan, J. (2017). Feminism and rethinking our models of the self. Philosophy & Social Criticism, 43(1), 3-33.
- Meehan, J. (2019). Intersubjectivity on the Couch: Recognition and Destruction in the Work of Jessica Benjamin. In Transitional Subjects: Critical Theory and Object Relations (pp. 185–208). Columbia University Press.
