= 1800 in philosophy =

1800 in philosophy

== Publications ==
- Edmund Burke's Thoughts and Details on Scarcity (published posthumously)
- Johann Gottlieb Fichte's The Closed Commercial State [Der geschlossene Handelsstaat] and The Vocation of Man [Die Bestimmung des Menschen]
- Elizabeth Hamilton's fictionalised Memoirs of Modern Philosophers
- Immanuel Kant's Logik, prepared by Gottlob Benjamin Jäsche
- Friedrich Wilhelm Joseph Schelling's System of Transcendental Idealism [System des transcendentalen Idealismus]
