= 1809 in philosophy =

1809 in philosophy

== Events ==
- Wilhelm von Humboldt appointed head of the Department for Culture and Public Education in the Prussian Ministry of the Interior.

== Publications ==
- Jean-Baptiste Lamarck's Philosophie Zoologique
- Friedrich Wilhelm Joseph Schelling's Philosophical Inquiries into the Essence of Human Freedom
- Johann Michael Sailer's On Education - for Educators [Über Erziehung für Erzieher]

== Births ==
- January 4 - Louis Braille (died 1852)
- February 12 - Charles Darwin (died 1882)
- August 29 - Oliver Wendell Holmes Sr. (died 1894)
- September 6 - Bruno Bauer (died 1882)

== Deaths ==
- June 8 - Thomas Paine (born 1737)
