= 1872 in philosophy =

== Births ==
- 18 May 1872 - Bertrand Russell (died 1970)
