= The Enigma of Health =

The Enigma of Health. The Art of Healing in a Scientific Age
- Author: Hans-Georg Gadamer
- Original title: Über die Verborgenheit der Gesundheit
- Translator: Jason Gaiger and Nicholas Walker
- Language: German
- Subject: Philosophy of medicine
- Published: 1993
- Publisher: Polity Press
- Publication place: Germany
- English publication date: 1996
- Media type: Print
- ISBN: 9780804726924

The Enigma of Health: The Art of Healing in a Scientific Age (German: Über die Verborgenheit der Gesundheit) is a 1993 book about the philosophy of medicine by Hans-Georg Gadamer, in which the author examines the key components of medical practice such as death, life, anxiety, freedom, health and the relationship between the body and the soul based on the phenomenological framework developed by Martin Heidegger in Being and Time.
