= Franciszek Indan Pykna =

Polish mathematician, philosopher (1913–1992)

Franciszek Indan Pykna (12 July 1913 – 29 January 1992) was a Polish mathematician, philosopher, and linguist.

== Early life ==
Pykna was born in Riga, Russian Empire, to Polish parents Kazimierz Indan Pykno and Benigna Norwillo. He spent his early childhood travelling with his parents through Russia; they returned to Poland (Kunow and Odrowaz). They finally settled in Kovel, where he went to Juliusz Slowacki High School. After graduating he moved to Vilnius in order to study at Vilnius University.

== Academic work ==
Pykna achieved a master's degree in 1937 with his thesis "The concept of ethical philosophy of Descartes". He became an assistant in the Philosophy department of Stefan Batory University while working on his PhD in the subject of ethics He was nominated as senior assistant to the department of Philosophy starting on 1 September 1939, which was the day World War II started; the university was evacuated to Poland. After the war, most of the staff settled in Toruń, Poland, creating Nicolaus Copernicus University in Toruń. In 1945 he worked in the department of logic studies at the university as a senior assistant to professor Tadeusz Czezowski. Between 1947 and 1948 he headed the mathematical department in the Fourth College in Torun.

He then returned to Nicolaus Copernicus University, working with professor Roman Ingarden and Tadeusz Czezowski. He started publishing his works: "Revue Philosophique de la France et de l'Etranger", "Pozytywizm etyczny Emila Durkheima" (Emile Durkheim's ethical positivism; 1960), "Set of tasks of probability and mathematical statistics" (1962) "Cohorts method applied to arrays of elimination" (1967), and "Mathematics Theory and a set of tasks" (1973).

His correspondence with Tadeusz Kotarbinski (philosopher and professor of University of Warsaw) can be found in the archives of Archives of Janina and Tadeusz Kotarbinski, 1962. Franciszek Indan was a board member of the Polish Society of Mathematics from 1971 to 1981. His works are available on line from Twardowski Digital Archives.

== Private life ==
He was married to Zofia Siemaszko, with whom he had five children.
