= 1781 in philosophy =

1781 in philosophy

== Publications ==
- Immanuel Kant, Critique of Pure Reason (1781)

== Births ==
- January 30 Adelbert von Chamisso (died 1838)
- May 6 - Karl Christian Friedrich Krause (died 1832)
- October 5 - Bernard Bolzano (died 1848)

== Deaths ==
- February 15 - Gotthold Ephraim Lessing (born 1729)
