= Margaret Morrison (philosopher) =

Canadian philosopher (1954–2021)

Margaret C. "Margie" Morrison (19 May 1954 – 9 January 2021) was a Canadian philosopher. She worked in the philosophy of science. She was elected to the Leopoldina in 2004, the Royal Society of Canada in 2015, the Académie Internationale de Philosophie des Sciences in 2016, and received a Guggenheim Fellowship in 2017.

== Career ==
Morrison became interested in the philosophy of science while an undergraduate research assistant in the Department of Biophysics at Dalhousie University. She went on to graduate and post-graduate degrees at the University of Western Ontario, earning her PhD in 1987. Before joining U of T, she taught at Stanford University and the University of Minnesota. In Toronto, she received tenure in 1992 and gained promotion to the rank of full professor in 1998. Her early work included examination of how concrete insight is extracted from abstract mathematical representations. Later she went on to working on the epistemic value of computer simulations. Morrison taught at Stanford University and the University of Minnesota. She was a professor at the University of Toronto from 1989 until her retirement in 2019.

She also held research fellowships at the Institute for Advanced Study in Berlin, the Centre for Mathematical Philosophy at LMU Munich, and the Centre for the Philosophy of the Natural and Social Sciences at the London School of Economics.

== Personal life ==
Morrison married the English Bayesian philosopher Colin Howson in 2003. She died on 19 May 2021 after a protracted battle against cancer, her husband having predeceased her, also of cancer, the previous year.

== Education ==
- BA, Dalhousie University
- MA, University of Western Ontario
- PhD, University of Western Ontario

== Publications ==
- Community and Coexistence: Kant’s Third Analogy of Experience, (Kant-Studien, 1998)
- Models as Mediators, Cambridge University Press (1999) (editor)
- Unifying Scientific Theories: Physical Concepts and Mathematical Structures, (Cambridge University Press, 2000)
- Reconstructing Reality: Models, Mathematics, and Simulations (Oxford University Press, 2015)
