= 1919 in philosophy =

1919 in philosophy

== Births ==
- March 18 - G. E. M. Anscombe (died 2001)
- March 21 - R. M. Hare (died 2002)
- May 31 - Huston Smith (died 2016)
- July 15 - Iris Murdoch (died 1999)
- July 26 - James Lovelock (died 2022)
- September 13 - Mary Midgley (died 2018)
- September 21 - Mario Bunge (died 2020)
- November 5 - Richard Clyde Taylor (died 2003)
- November 23 - P. F. Strawson (died 2006)
- November 29 - Frank Kermode (died 2010)
- December 6 - Paul de Man (died 1983)

== Deaths ==
- January 15 - Rosa Luxemburg (born 1871)
- August 9 - Ernst Haeckel (born 1834)
