= 1930 in philosophy =

This is a timeline of 1930 in philosophy.

== Publications ==
- Paul Dirac, The Principles of Quantum Mechanics (1930)

=== Philosophical literature ===
- Robert Musil, The Man Without Qualities (1930-1942)

== Births ==
- March 8 – Ernst Tugendhat (died 2023)
- March 12 – Kurt Flasch
- April 9 – Nathaniel Branden (died 2014)
- April 12 – Bryan Magee (died 2019)
- May 3 – Luce Irigaray
- June 13 – Paul Veyne (died 2022)
- July 11 – Harold Bloom (died 2019)
- July 15 – Jacques Derrida (died 2004)
- July 19 – Daniel Callahan (died 2019)
- August 1 – Pierre Bourdieu (died 2002)
- September 14 – Allan Bloom (died 1992)
- September 28 – Immanuel Wallerstein (died 2019)

== Deaths ==
- January 19 - Frank Ramsey (born 1903)
