= 1978 in philosophy =

1978 in philosophy

== Events ==
- The Philosopher's Annual is established.

== Publications ==
- Critical Inquiry, Special Issue: On Metaphor (Volume 5, Number 1)
  - Ted Cohen, "Metaphor and the Cuiltivation of Intimacy" (Excerpt)
  - Paul de Man, "The Epistemology of Metaphor" (Excerpt)
  - Donald Davidson, "What Metaphors Mean" Excerpt)
  - Wayne C. Booth, "Metaphor as Rhetoric: The Problem of Evaluation" (Excerpt)
  - Karsten Harries, "Metaphor and Transcendence" (Excerpt)
  - David Tracy, "Metaphor and Religion: The Test Case of Christian Texts" (Excerpt)
  - Richard Shiff, "Art and Life: A Metaphoric Relationship" (Excerpt)
  - Howard Gardner and Ellen Winner, "The Development of Metaphoric Competence: Implications for Humanistic Disciplines" (Excerpt)
  - Paul Ricoeur, "The Metaphorical Process as Cognition, Imagination, and Feeling" (Excerpt)
  - Afterthoughts on Metaphor
  - W.V. Quine, "A Postscript on Metaphor" (Excerpt)
  - Don R. Swanson, "Toward a Psychology of Metaphor" (Excerpt)
  - Karsten Harries, "The Many Uses of Metaphor" (Excerpt)
  - Wayne C. Booth, "Ten Literal 'Theses'" (Excerpt)
  - Critical Responses
  - I. Margaret Schaefer, "Psychoanalysis and the Marionette Theater: Interpretation Is Not Depreciation" (Excerpt)
  - Heinz Kohut, "A Reply to Margret Schaefer" (Excerpt)
  - In the end
  - Kenneth Burke, "A Critical Load, Beyond That Door..." (Excerpt)
- Lewis White Beck, Essays on Kant and Hume
- John McDowell, "On ‘The Reality of the Past", in Christopher Hookway and Philip Pettit, eds., Action and Interpretation (CUP, Cambridge), pp. 127-44
- John McDowell, "Are Moral Requirements Hypothetical Imperatives?", Aristotelian Society Supplementary Volume lii, 13-29
- John McDowell, "Physicalism and Primitive Denotation", Erkenntnis, xiii, pp. 131–52
- Mary Midgley, Beast and Man: The Roots of Human Nature. London: Routledge and Kegan Paul
- Hilary Putnam, Meaning and the Moral Sciences. London: Routledge and Kegan Paul
- Alan Gewirth, Reason and Morality
- Hannah Arendt, The Life of the Mind (published posthumously in 1978)
- John Perry, A Dialogue on Personal Identity and Immortality

== Deaths ==
- January 14 - Kurt Gödel (born 1906)
- May 13 - Anton Charles Pegis (born 1905)
