= Richard Kraut =

American philosopher (born 1944)

- Born: October 27, 1944 (age 82); New York City, U.S.
- Education: University of Michigan (B.A.); Princeton University (Ph.D.)
- Scientific career
- Fields: Philosophy
- Workplaces: Northwestern University
- Doctoral advisor: Gregory Vlastos
- Website: philosophy.northwestern.edu/people/emeriti-faculty/kraut-richard.html

Richard Kraut is an American philosopher who is the Emeritus Charles and Emma Morrison Professor in the Humanities at Northwestern University and a specialist in ancient Greek philosophy.

== Bibliography ==
=== Books ===
- Socrates and the State (Princeton UP: 1984).
- Aristotle on the Human Good (Princeton UP: 1989).
- Aristotle Politics Books VII and VIII, traduction avec commentaires (Clarendon: 1997).
- Aristotle: Political Philosophy (Oxford UP: 2002)
- What is Good and Why: The Ethics of Well-Being (Harvard UP: 2007).
- How to Read Plato (Granta Books : 2008).
- Against Absolute Goodness (Oxford University Press: 2011).

=== Editor ===
- The Cambridge Companion to Plato (Cambridge, 1992).
- Plato's Republic: Critical Essays (Rowman & Littlefield, 1997).
- Aristotle's Politics: Critical Essays (with Steven Skultety, Rowman & Littlefield, 2005)
- The Blackwell Guide to Aristotle's Nicomachean Ethics (2006)

=== Articles ===
- Two Conceptions of Happiness, The Philosophical Review 88 (1979), p. 167-197. (Reprinted in Louis Pojman, ed., Ethical Theory: Classical and Contemporary Readings, Wadsworth Publishing Co., 1989; also in William H. Shaw, ed., Social and Personal Ethics, Wadsworth Publishing Co., 1993, and in T.I. Irwin, ed., Articles on Greek and Roman Philosophy, Garland Publishing Inc.
- The Defense of Justice in Plato's Republic, in R. Kraut (ed.), The Cambridge Companion to Plato, Cambridge University Press, 1992, p. 311-337.
- Return to the Cave: Republic 519-521, In Oxford Readings in Philosophy: Plato: Ethics, Politics, Religion, and the Soul, ed. by Gail Fine, Oxford University Press, 1999
- Doing Without Morality: Reflections on the Meaning of Dein in Aristotle's Nicomachean Ethics, Oxford Studies in Ancient Philosophy, mai 2006, p. 169-200.
- How to Justify Ethical Propositions, in Richard Kraut (ed.), The Blackwell Guide to Aristotle's Nicomachean Ethics, (2006, p. 76-95.
- The Examined Life, Sara Ahbel-Rappe & Rachana Kamtekar (eds.), A Companion to Socrates. Blackwell (2006, pp. 228–42).
- An Aesthetic Reading of Aristotle’s Ethics. In Verity Harte and Melissa Lane (eds.), Politeia: Essays in Honour of Malcolm Schofield, Cambridge University Press, 2013.
- Human Diversity and the Nature of Well-Being: Reflections on Sumner’s Methodology, Res Philosophica, vol. 90, nº 3, juillet 2013, p. 307-322.
- “Précis: Against Absolute Goodness” and “Replies to Stroud, Thomson, and Crisp,” Philosophy and Phenomenological Research, Vol. 87, nº 2, p. 457-8 et p. 483-501, septembre 2013.
