= 1983 in philosophy =

1983 in philosophy saw the publication of several important works and the deaths of a few notable philosophers.

== Publications ==
- Keiji Nishitani, Religion and Nothingness
- Benedict Anderson, Imagined Communities
- Vilém Flusser, Towards a Philosophy of Photography
- John Searle, Intentionality: An Essay in the Philosophy of Mind
- Peter Sloterdijk, Critique of Cynical Reason

== Deaths ==
- July 1 - Buckminster Fuller (born 1895)
- October 17 - Raymond Aron (born 1905)
- December 21 - Paul de Man (born 1919)
