= 1982 in philosophy =

1982 in philosophy

== Publications ==
- J. L. Mackie, The Miracle of Theism: Arguments for and against the Existence of God (1982)
- Carol Gilligan, In a Different Voice (1982)
- Tzvetan Todorov, The Conquest of America: The Question of the Other (1982)
- Michael Sandel, Liberalism and the Limits of Justice (1982)

== Births ==
- September 24th - Neil McDonnell,Scottish philosopher
- September 25th - Jennifer Corns, Glasgow-based philosopher working on pain.

== Deaths ==
- February 21 - Gershom Scholem (born 1897)
- March 2 - Philip K. Dick (born 1928)
- March 6 - Ayn Rand (born 1905)
- June 26 - Alexander Mitscherlich (born 1908)
- October 9 - Anna Freud (born 1895)
- November 19 - Erving Goffman (born 1922)
