= 2024 in philosophy =

== Events ==
- January 15–18, 2024: 2024 Eastern Division Meeting of the American Philosophical Association, New York City.
- February 21–24: 2024 Central Division Meeting of the American Philosophical Association, New Orleans, Louisiana.

== Publications ==
- Jonathan Birch, The Edge of Sentience (Oxford University Press, 2024).
- Holmes, Robert L. . 'Tolstoy On War', In Tolstoy's War and Peace: Philosophical Perspectives. Cicovacki, Predrack Ed. Oxford University Press 20 June 2024

== Deaths ==
- Johanna Meehan (February 1, 1956 – January 8, 2024), American philosopher
- Rafael Alvira (October 24, 1942 – February 4, 2024), Spanish philosopher
- Howard Stein (January 21, 1929 – March 8, 2024), American philosopher and historian of science
- Robert Merrihew Adams (September 8, 1937 – April 16, 2024), American analytic philosopher focussed on philosophy of religion
- Daniel Dennett (March 28, 1942 – April 19, 2024), American philosopher and cognitive scientist
- Forrest Clingerman (January 29, 1972 - April 21, 2024), American philosopher
