= 1981 in philosophy =

1981 in philosophy

== Events ==
- Gadamer–Derrida debate

== Publications ==
- Peter Singer, The Expanding Circle (1981)
- Alasdair MacIntyre, After Virtue (1981)
- Robert Nozick, Philosophical Explanations (1981)
- Jürgen Habermas, The Theory of Communicative Action (1981)
- Jean Baudrillard, Simulacra and Simulation (1981)

== Deaths ==
- January 5
  - Lanza del Vasto, Italian-born philosopher, poet and activist (b. 1901)
  - Frederick Osborn (born 1889)
- February 1 - Morris Weitz (born 1916)
- February 20 - Ioannis Theodorakopoulos (born 1900)
- February 26 - Wilmon Henry Sheldon (born 1875)
- March 8 - Joseph Henry Woodger (born 1894)
- March 28 - Tadeusz Czeżowski (born 1889)
- June 16 - Julius Ebbinghaus (born 1885)
- July 27 - Paul Brunton (born 1898)
- August 5 - Jerzy Neyman (born 1894)
- September 2 - Knud Ejler Løgstrup (born 1905)
- September 8 - Nisargadatta Maharaj (born 1897)
- September 9 - Jacques Lacan (born 1901)
- September 23 - Notonagoro (born 1905)
- September 24 - Brahmarishi Hussain Sha (born 1905)
- September 29 - Ksenija Atanasijević
- October 3 - Tadeusz Kotarbiński (born 1886)
- October 7 - Huberto Rohden (born 1893)
- November 7 - Will Durant (born 1885)
- November 15 - Muhammad Husayn Tabatabaei (born 1903)
- December 2 - Alexis Kagame (born 1912)
- December 12 - J. L. Mackie (born 1917)
- Acharya Rameshwar Jha
