= Jean Nicod Prize =

French academic award for philosophy of mind

The Jean Nicod Prize is awarded annually in Paris to a leading philosopher of mind or philosophically oriented cognitive scientist. The lectures are organized by the Centre National de la Recherche Scientifique as part of its effort to promote interdisciplinary research in cognitive science in France. The 1993 lectures marked the centenary of the birth of the French philosopher and logician Jean Nicod (1893–1924). Besides the CNRS, sponsors include the École Normale Supérieure and the School for Advanced Studies in the Social Sciences. The Jean Nicod lecturer is expected to deliver at least four lectures on a topic of his or her choice, and subsequently to publish the set of lectures, or a monograph based on them in the Jean Nicod Lectures series (MIT Press/Bradford Books; F. Recanati editor).

== List ==
List of Jean Nicod Prize laureates from 1993 to the present day
| Year | Name | Affiliation | Title | Publication |
|---|---|---|---|---|
| 1993 | Jerry Fodor | Rutgers University | The Elm and the Expert: Mentalese and Its Semantics | ISBN 0-262-56093-3 |
| 1994 | Fred Dretske | Stanford University | Naturalizing the Mind | ISBN 0-262-54089-4 |
| 1995 | Donald Davidson | University of California, Berkeley | The Sources of Objectivity | n/a |
| 1996 | Hans Kamp | University of Stuttgart | Thinking and Talking about Things | n/a |
| 1997 | Jon Elster | Columbia University | Strong Feelings. Emotion, Addiction, and Human Behavior | ISBN 0-262-05056-0 |
| 1998 | Susan Carey | Harvard University | The Origins of Concepts: Evolution vs Culture | n/a |
| 1999 | John Perry | Stanford University | Knowledge, Possibility, and Consciousness | ISBN 0-262-16199-0 |
| 2000 | John Searle | University of California, Berkeley | Rationality in Action | ISBN 0-262-19463-5 |
| 2001 | Daniel Dennett | Tufts University | Sweet Dreams: Philosophical Obstacles to a Science of Consciousness | ISBN 0-262-04225-8 |
| 2002 | Ruth Millikan | University of Connecticut | Varieties of Meaning | ISBN 0-262-13444-6 |
| 2003 | Ray Jackendoff | Tufts University | Mental Structures. Language, Society, Consciousness | ISBN 0-262-10119-X |
| 2004 | Zenon Pylyshyn | Rutgers University | Things and Places. How the mind connects with the world | ISBN 0-262-16245-8 |
| 2005 | Gilbert Harman | Princeton University | The Problem of Induction and Statistical Learning Theory | ISBN 0-262-08360-4 |
| 2006 | Michael Tomasello | Max Planck Institute for Evolutionary Anthropology, Leipzig | Origins of Human Communication | ISBN 0-262-20177-1 |
| 2007 | Stephen Stich | Rutgers University | Moral Theory Meets Cognitive Science: How the Cognitive Science Can Transform Traditional Debates | n/a |
| 2008 | Kim Sterelny | Victoria University of Wellington | The Fate of the Third Chimpanzee | n/a |
| 2009 | Elizabeth Spelke | Harvard University | Sources of Human Knowledge | n/a |
| 2010 | Tyler Burge | University of California, Los Angeles | Thresholds of Reason | n/a |
| 2011 | Gergely Csibra; György Gergely | Central European University | Natural Pedagogy | |
| 2013 | Ned Block | New York University | Conscious, Preconscious, Unconscious | |
| 2014 | Uta Frith and Chris Frith | University College London | What is innate and what is acquired in social cognition? and Mechanisms of social interaction | |
| 2015 | David Chalmers | New York University | Spatial Illusions: From Mirrors to Virtual Reality | |
| 2016 | Patrick Haggard | University College London | Volition, Agency, Responsibility: Cognitive Mechanisms of Human Action | |
| 2017 | John Campbell | UC Berkeley | How language enters perception | |
| 2019 | Martine Nida-Rümelin | University of Fribourg | Philosophical fundamentals for scientific studies of consciousness | |
| 2020 | Leda Cosmides; John Tooby | University of California Santa Barbara | The Adaptationist Revolution and the Transformation of the Cognitive Sciences | |
| 2021 | Frances Egan | Rutgers University | Deflating Mental Representation | |
| 2022 | Peter Godfrey-Smith | The University of Sydney | The Evolution of Experience | |
| 2023 | Nancy Kanwisher | Massachusetts Institute of Technology | Functional Organization of the Human Brain | |
| 2024 | Christopher Peacocke | Columbia University | Understanding Music | |
| 2025 | Peter Gärdenfors | Lund University | The Evolution of Cognition | |
| 2026 | Elisabeth Camp | Rutgers University | Frames and Perspectives | |

== See also ==
- Institut Jean Nicod
- List of awards named after people
- List of cognitive scientists
- List of social sciences awards
- List of philosophy awards
- List of psychology awards
- Philosophy of psychology
