= 2018 in philosophy =

2018 in philosophy

== Events ==
- Gualtiero Piccinini is awarded the 2018 Barwise Prize.
- Martha Nussbaum is awarded the Berggruen Prize for her work which "shows how philosophy, far from being merely an armchair discipline, offers a greater understanding of who we are, our place in the world, and a way to live a well-lived life."
- Lisa Shapiro is awarded the Elisabeth of Bohemia Prize.
- Sally Haslanger and John Heil are awarded Guggenheim Fellowships in philosophy.
- Ann Pettifor is presented a Hannah Arendt Award.
- Michael Stolleis receives a Hegel Prize.
- Nancy Cartwright receives the Hempel Award.
- Sabina Leonelli is awarded the Lakatos Award.
- Gillian Barker receives the PSA Women's Caucus Prize in Feminist Philosophy of Science.
- Saharon Shelah is awarded the 2018 Rolf Schock Prize in Logic and Philosophy.
- Margarethe von Trotta is awarded the Theodor W. Adorno Award.

== Publications ==
Publications:

- February 8 - Michel Foucault, Histoire de la sexualité, IV : Les aveux de la chair (Gallimard)
- February 19 – Tommie Shelby & Brandon Terry (ed.), To Shape a New World: Essays on the Political Philosophy of Martin Luther King, Jr. (Harvard University Press)
- February 22 - Robert L. Holmes, Introduction to Applied Ethics (Bloomsbury)
- March 4 – T. M. Scanlon, Why Does Inequality Matter? (Oxford University Press)
- May 22 - Errol Morris, The Ashtray (Or the Man Who Denied Reality)
- July 17 - Eugene Thacker, Infinite Resignation: On Pessimism (Repeater)

== Deaths ==
- July 5 - Claude Lanzmann, French philosopher and documentary filmmaker (b. 1925)
- October 10 - Mary Midgley, British moral philosopher (b. 1919)
- October 13 - Fabien Eboussi Boulaga, Cameroonian philosopher (b. 1934)
- October 27 - Denis Miéville, Swiss mathematician and expert on the logic of Stanislaw Lesniewski and natural logic (b. 1946)
- November 2 - Herbert Fingarette, American philosopher (b. 1921)
- November 4 – Bertil Mårtensson, Swedish academic philosopher and writer of crime, fantasy and science fiction (b. 1945)
- November 15 – Adolf Grünbaum, German-American philosopher of science and a critic of psychoanalysis, as well as Karl Popper's philosophy of science (b. 1923)
- December 23 – Sophie Oluwole, Nigerian philosopher (b. 1936)
- December 25 – Isaac Levi, John Dewey Professor of Philosophy Emeritus at Columbia University (b. 1930)
