= 1984 in philosophy =

This is a list of notable events that took place in 1984 in philosophy.

== Publications ==
- Nel Noddings, Caring: A Feminine Approach to Ethics and Moral Education
- Fredric Jameson, Postmodernism, or, the Cultural Logic of Late Capitalism
- Derek Parfit, Reasons and Persons
- Lewis White Beck, "What Have We Learned from Kant?", in Self and Nature in Kant's Philosophy, Ed. Allen W. Wood. Chapter I

=== Philosophical fiction ===
- Milan Kundera, The Unbearable Lightness of Being

== Deaths ==
- March 30 - Karl Rahner (born 1904)
- June 25 - Michel Foucault (born 1926)
- November 26 - Bernard Lonergan (born 1904)
