= 2025 in philosophy =

== Events ==
- January 8–11: Eastern Division Meeting of the American Philosophical Association (New York City).

== Deaths ==
- Alasdair MacIntyre - Died May 21, 2025 at 96 years old

== Publications ==
- Jeff Sebo, The Moral Circle (W. W. Norton & Company)
