= 2026 in philosophy =

== Events ==
- 2026 Eastern Division Meeting of the American Philosophical Association takes places January 7-10, 2026 in Baltimore, Maryland.
- 2026 Central Division Meeting of the American Philosophical Association takes places February 18-21, 2026 in Chicago, Illinois.
