= 1986 in philosophy =

1986 in philosophy

== Publications ==
- Saunders Mac Lane, Mathematics, Form and Function
- Hans Blumenberg, Lebenszeit und Weltzeit (not yet translated into English)
- David Gauthier, Morals by Agreement
- David Lewis, On the Plurality of Worlds
- Martha Nussbaum, The Fragility of Goodness
- Thomas Nagel, The View from Nowhere

== Deaths ==
- January 9 - Michel de Certeau (born 1925)
- February 17 - Jiddu Krishnamurti (born 1895)
- February 19 - André Leroi-Gourhan (born 1911)
- April 14 - Simone de Beauvoir (born 1908)
