= Berggruen Prize for Philosophy and Culture =

Philosophy award

- Awarded for: Ideas of broad significance for shaping human self-understanding and the advancement of humanity
- Location: Los Angeles, California, United States
- Presented by: Berggruen Institute
- Reward: US$1,000,000
- First award: 2016
- Final award: 2025
- Currently held by: Thomas Nagel (2026)
- Website: Berggruen Institute

The Berggruen Prize for Philosophy and Culture is a US$1-million award given each year to a significant individual in the field of philosophy. It is awarded by the Berggruen Institute to "thinkers whose ideas have helped us find direction, wisdom, and improved self-understanding in a world being rapidly transformed by profound social, technological, political, cultural, and economic change."

The Berggruen Prize was first awarded in 2016 with the overt purpose of becoming a "Nobel prize for philosophy". The first recipient of the Berggruen Prize was the Canadian philosopher Charles Taylor, whose work "urges us to see humans as constituted not only by their biology or their personal intentions, but also by their existence within language and webs of meaningful relationships."

The prize is awarded annually in October, with a ceremony at the New York Public Library. In 2016, ceremony speakers included University of Pennsylvania president Amy Gutmann and journalist Fareed Zakaria. The ceremony honoring Japanese philosopher Kojin Karatani was held in Tokyo, Japan. In 2024, the ceremony was held in Washington, D.C., at the National Museum of African American History and Culture, with journalist Michel Martin serving as a speaker.

== Berggruen Prize Laureates ==
Year	Recipient	Country	Citation	Fields
2016	Charles Taylor (born 1931)	Canada	"whose work urges us to see humans as constituted not only by their biology or their personal intentions but also by their existence within language and webs of meaningful relationships."	Political philosophy, cosmopolitanism, hermeneutics, philosophy of religion, philosophical anthropology
2017	Onora O'Neill (born 1941)	United Kingdom	for "her works have elevated the quality of public life and improved the very vocabulary of public discourse."	Political philosophy, ethics
2018	Martha Nussbaum (born 1947)	United States	for "her transformative work as an academic philosopher into public debates about key questions of national and global political significance, making her one of the world's leading public philosophers."	Liberal theory, political philosophy, feminism, ethics, social liberalism
2019	Ruth Bader Ginsburg (1933–2020)	United States	for being "a lifelong trailblazer for human rights and gender equality and a constant voice for justice, equal and accessible to all."	Law, political science, feminism, liberalism, social justice
2020	Paul Farmer (1959–2022)	United States	"leader in the development of public anthropology, as well as in improving health care for the world's poorest people."	Internal medicine, infectious disease, medical anthropology
2021	Peter Singer (born 1946)	Australia	"for promoting the idea of 'effective altruism,' which encourages people to have reason, rather than empathy, guide their philanthropy."	Applied ethics, bioethics, utilitarianism, environmental ethics, philosophy of life
2022	Kojin Karatani (born 1941)	Japan	for his "radically original contributions to modern philosophy, the history of philosophy, and political thinking—making Karatani’s work particularly valuable in the current era of troubled global capitalism, crisis in democratic states, and resurgent but seldom self-critical nationalism."	Political philosophy, history of philosophy, deconstruction, comparative literature, literary criticism
2023	Patricia Hill Collins (born 1948)	United States	for how her work "provides a powerful analytical lens through which we can envision the different and intersecting ways in which our material, social, and cultural worlds produce injustice," and has given us "original vocabulary with which to think about social power and contestation."	Social theory, Sociology of knowledge, Feminism, Feminist sociology, Gender studies, Black feminism
2024	No award			
2025	Michael Sandel (born 1953)	United States	for his "use philosophy as an invitation to a more robust citizenship than we've become accustomed to, to prompt public deliberation about big questions that matter, such as what makes for a just society and how can we seek the common good."	Contemporary philosophy, Ethics, Jurisprudence, Political philosophy, Communitarianism
2026	Thomas Nagel (born 1937)	United States	"One of the most significant philosophers of our time, Nagel has made long-lasting contributions through his scholarly work in the public sphere. His work…has deepened our understanding of consciousness, existence, altruism, equality, justice, and free will."	Consciousness, Ethics, Legal philosophy, political philosophy, Epistemology

== Berggruen Prize Jury ==
=== Current Prize Jury Members ===
Image	Jury	Country	Details	Entered	Other Groups
	David Chalmers (b. 1966)	Australia	Professor of Philosophy and Neural Science, New York University	2018	
	Antonio Damasio (b. 1944)	Portugal; United States	Professor of Neuroscience, Psychology and Philosophy, University of Southern California	2016	Bio/Tech Futures; The Berggruen Network; Transformations of the Human Advisory Board
	Yuk Hui	Hong Kong	Professor of Philosophy, Erasmus University Rotterdam	2020	TofTH Senior Fellows
	Siri Hustvedt (b. 1955)	United States	Novelist, Poet, and Essayist; Recipient, 2019 Princess of Asturias Awards for Literature	2021	The Berggruen Network
	Pratap Bhanu Mehta (b. 1967)	India	Laurance S. Rockefeller Visiting Professor for Distinguished Teaching	2021	The Berggruen Network
	Elif Shafak (b. 1971)	Turkey; United Kingdom	Novelist, Essayist, and Activist; Recipient, Ordre des Arts et des Lettres	2018	Noema Magazine Editorial Board
	Wang Hui (b. 1959)	China	Professor of Chinese Language, Literature, and History, Tsinghua University	2016	The Berggruen Network
	Carlo Rovelli (b. 1956)	Italy	Physicist, writer, Aix-Marseille University	2020	The Berggruen Network

=== Berggruen Prize Jury Emeriti ===
Image	Jury	Country	Details	Entered	Withdrew	Other Groups
	Kwame Anthony Appiah (b. 1954)	United Kingdom; Ghana	Professor of Philosophy and Law, New York University	2016	2022	The Berggruen Network
	Leszek Borysiewicz (b. 1951)	United Kingdom	Vice Chancellor, University of Cambridge	2016	2020	The Berggruen Network
	Amy Gutmann (b. 1949)	United States	President of the University of Pennsylvania	2016	2021	The Berggruen Network
	Amartya Sen (b. 1933)	India; United States	Professor of Economics and Philosophy, Harvard University; Recipient, 1998 Nobel Memorial Prize in Economic Sciences	2016	2020	The Berggruen Network
	Alison Simmons (b. 1965)	United States	Professor of Philosophy, Harvard University	2016	2021	The Berggruen Network
	Michael Spence (b. 1943)	United States; Canada	Professor of Economics and Business, New York University; Recipient, 2001 Nobel Memorial Prize in Economic Sciences	2016	2020	The Berggruen Network
	George Yeo (b. 1954)	Singapore	Former Foreign Minister of Singapore; Senior Adviser to both Kuok Group and Kerry Logistics Network	2016	2020	The Berggruen Network

== See also ==
- Kyoto Prize in Arts and Philosophy
