= 2019 in philosophy =

2019 in philosophy

== Events ==
- Jordan Peterson and Slavoj Zizek debate: Happiness: communism vs capitalism.
- Jonathan Lear and Judith Jarvis Thomson are elected to the American Philosophical Society at its spring 2019 meeting.
- Donald A. Brown is awarded the Avicenna Prize.
- Margaret Boden is awarded the 2019 Barwise Prize.
- Ruth Bader Ginsburg wins the 2019 Berggruen Prize.
- Ágnes Heller is awarded the 2019 Friedrich Nietzsche Prize.
- Agnes Callard, Robert B. Pippin, Henry S. Richardson, and Miriam Solomon are awarded Guggenheim Fellowships in philosophy.
- Jerome Kohn and Roger Berkowitz are presented a Hannah Arendt Award.
- Martine Nida-Rümelin is awarded the 2019 Jean Nicod Prize.
- Rudolf G. Wagner is awarded the Karl Jaspers Prize.
- Henk W. de Regt is awarded the Lakatos Award.
- Elizabeth S. Anderson receives a "Genius Grant" from the MacArthur Fellows Program.
- Thomas Macho is awarded the Sigmund Freud Prize.

== Publications ==
- A Spirit of Trust: A Reading of Hegel’s Phenomenology, Robert Brandom (Harvard University Press, 2019).
- Saving People from the Harm of Death, edited by Espen Gamlund, Carl Tollef Solberg, and foreword by Jeff McMahan (Oxford University Press, 2019).
- Dimensions of Normativity: New Essays on Metaethics and Jurisprudence, edited by David Plunkett, Scott J. Shapiro, and Kevin Toh (Oxford University Press, 2019).
- The Fifth Corner of Four: An Essay on Buddhist Metaphysics and the Catuskoti, Graham Priest (Oxford University Press, 2019).
- The World Philosophy Made: From Plato to the Digital Age, Scott Soames (Princeton University Press, 2019).
- Measuring Social Welfare: An Introduction, Matthew Adler (Oxford University Press, 2019).
- The Cosmopolitan Tradition: A Noble but Flawed Ideal, Martha Nussbaum (Harvard University Press, 2019).
- How Change Happens, Cass Sunstein (MIT Press, 2019).

== Deaths ==
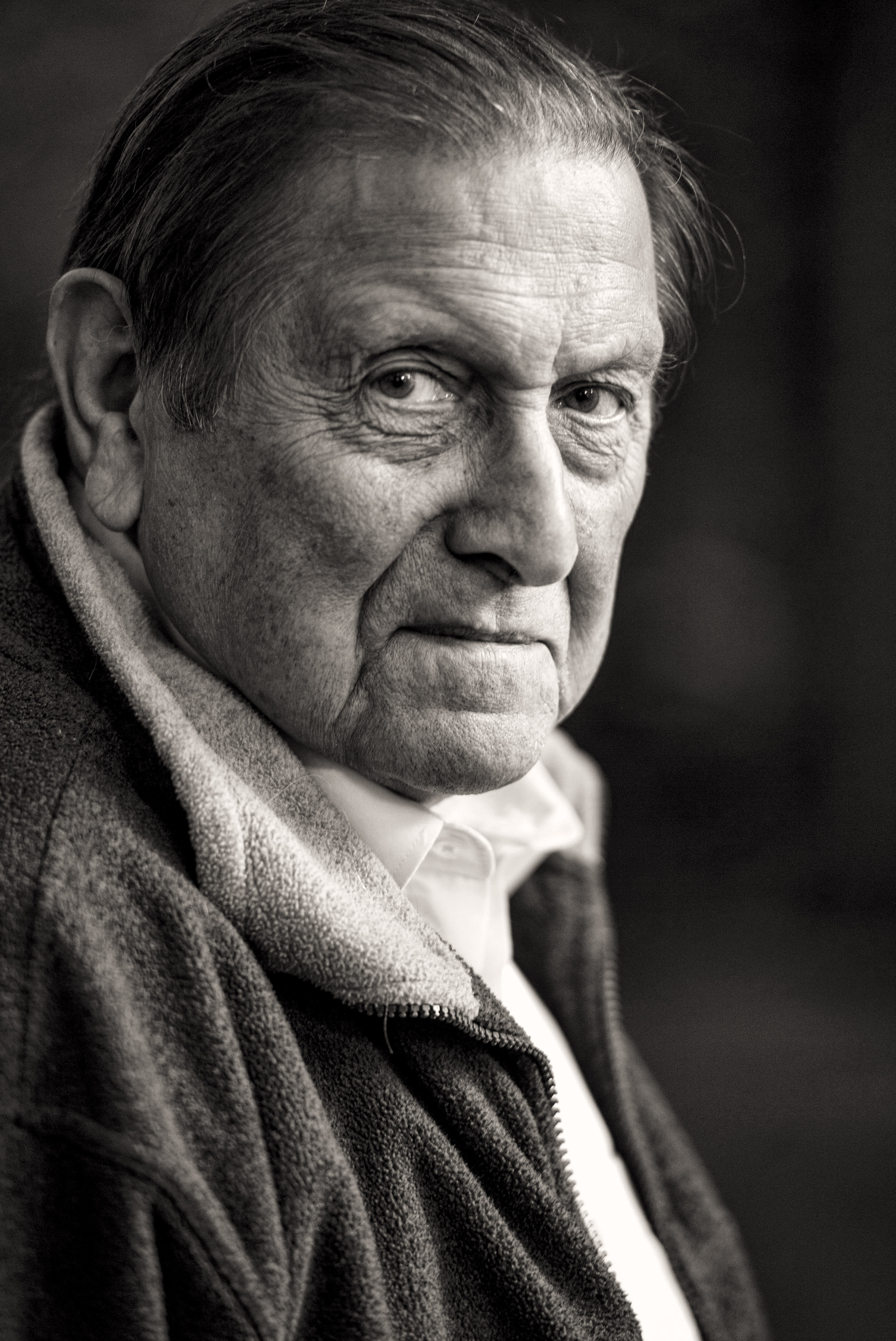
Etienne Vermeersch died in January.

- January 12 – Takeshi Umehara, Japanese philosopher (born 1925)
- January 18 – Gary Gutting, American philosopher (born 1942)
- January 18 – Etienne Vermeersch, Belgian philosopher (born 1934)
- July 7 – James D. Wallace, philosopher at University of Illinois Urbana-Champaign, father of author David Foster Wallace.
- July 11 – John Gardner, legal philosopher at Oxford University.
- July 16 – Daniel Callahan, American philosopher, bioethicist, and co-founder of The Hastings Center (born 1930).
- July 19 – Ágnes Heller, Hungarian philosopher who was part of the Budapest School.
- July 26 – Bryan Magee, British popularizer of philosophy (born 1930).
- 9 August – Barry Stroud, Canadian philosopher known for his work on philosophical skepticism, David Hume, and Ludwig Wittgenstein.
- 18 September – Richard Watson, American philosopher known for his work on Descartes.
- 20 September – Myles Burnyeat, English philosopher specializing in ancient philosophy.
- 14 October – Karola Stotz, German philosopher specializing in philosophy of science.
- 17 October – Horace Romano Harré, British philosophy known for his work in philosophy of science and philosophy of psychology.
- 21 October – Michael Detlefsen, American philosopher who specialized in logic and philosophy of mathematics, spending most of his career at the University of Notre Dame.
- 21 November – James Griffin, American-born philosopher who spent much of his career at Oxford, specializing in ethics and value theory.
- 27 November – Jaegwon Kim, American philosopher who specialized in philosophy of mind and metaphysics.
- 2 December – Ken Taylor, American philosopher who specialized in philosophy of language and philosophy of mind.
- 23 December – Brian McGuinness, British philosopher.
