= 2023 in philosophy =

2023 in philosophy

== Events ==
- January 4–6: the annual American Philosophical Association Eastern Division meeting in Montreal, Quebec.
- April 5-8: the annual American Philosophical Association Pacific Division meeting in San Francisco.

== Publications ==
- Scott Hershovitz, Law Is a Moral Practice (Harvard University Press, 2023).

== Deaths ==
- Joseph Agassi (7 May 1927 – 22 January 2023), Israeli philosopher and logician; student of Karl Popper.
- R. Kent Greenawalt (June 25, 1936 — January 27, 2023), legal philosopher at Columbia Law School.
- Charles H. Kahn, (May 29, 1928 - March 5, 2023), classicist and philosopher at the University of Pennsylvania.
- Jitendra Nath Mohanty (1928 – 7 March 2023), Indian philosopher.
- Ernst Tugendhat (8 March 1930 – 13 March 2023), Czechoslovak-born German philosopher.
- Maria Rosa Antognazza (10 September 1964 – 28 March 2023), Italian-British philosopher who was professor of philosophy at King's College London.
- William Newton-Smith (May 25, 1943 – April 8, 2023), Canadian philosopher of science.
- Peter K. Machamer (October 20, 1942 – May 31, 2023), American philosopher and historian of science.
