= 1989 in philosophy =

1989 in philosophy

== Publications ==
- Robert L. Holmes, On War and Morality
- Roger Penrose, The Emperor's New Mind
- Richard Rorty, Contingency, Irony, and Solidarity
- Peter Sloterdijk, Infinite Mobilization (Eurotaoismus)
- Charles Taylor, Sources of the Self
- Richard Clyde Taylor, Reflective Wisdom
- Slavoj Žižek, The Sublime Object of Ideology

== Deaths ==
- June 27 - A. J. Ayer (born 1910)
- July 2 - Wilfrid Sellars (born 1912)
- July 27 - Dolf Sternberger (born 1907)
