= 1987 in philosophy =

1987 in philosophy was an important date for the publication of important works, as well as the death of Joseph Campbell.

== Publications ==
- Paul Feyerabend, Farewell to Reason (1987)
- Allan Bloom, The Closing of the American Mind (1987)
- Thomas Nagel, What Does It All Mean? (1987)
- Bruno Latour, Science in Action (1987)
- Alain Finkielkraut, The Defeat of the Mind (1987)
- Jerry Fodor, Psychosemantics (1987)

== Deaths ==
- October 30 - Joseph Campbell (born 1904)
