= 2022 in philosophy =

2022 in philosophy

== Events ==
- The annual American Philosophical Association Eastern Division meeting: January 5–8 in Baltimore, Maryland (originally planned for Montreal).

== Publications ==
- Catia Faria, Animal Ethics in the Wild (Cambridge University Press)

== Deaths ==
- October 9 – Bruno Latour, French philosopher, anthropologist and sociologist (b. 1947)
- September 15 – Saul Kripke, American philosopher and logician (b. 1940)
- Penelope Mackie (1953–2022), British philosopher who specialised in metaphysics and philosophical logic.
