= 1992 in philosophy =

1992 in philosophy

== Events ==
- Karl Popper awarded the Kyoto Prize in Arts and Philosophy for "symbolizing the open spirit of the 20th century" and for his "enormous influence on the formation of the modern intellectual climate".
- Günther Anders awarded the Sigmund Freud Prize.
- Anthropologist Robin Dunbar proposes Dunbar's number.
- Café philosophique founded by Marc Sautet in Paris.
- Robert L. Holmes is appointed as President of the Concerned Philosophers for Peace.

== Publications ==
- The End of History and the Last Man
- Systems of Survival
- The Creators
- Points...: Interviews, 1974-1994
- When Nietzsche Wept (novel)
- A History of the Mind
- Crispin Wright, Truth and Objectivity

== Deaths ==
- January 16 - Ajahn Chah (born 1918)
- January 29 - Franciszek Indan Pykna (born 1913)
- February 27 - Algirdas Julien Greimas (born 1917)
- March 23 - Friedrich Hayek (born 1899)
- April 1 - Aous Shakra (born 1908)
- April 6 - Hywel Lewis (born 1910)
- August 5 - Juan David García Bacca (born 1901)
- August 29 - Félix Guattari (born 1930)
- October 2 - Bogdan Suchodolski (born 1903)
- October 7 - Allan Bloom (born 1930)
- October 15 - Oliver Franks, Baron Franks (born 1905)
- October 27 - David Bohm (born 1917)
- October 29 - Louis Marin (born 1931)
- November 27 - F. S. C. Northrop (born 1893)
- December 12 - Suzanne Lilar (born 1901)
- December 17 - Günther Anders (born 1902)
- December 19 - H. L. A. Hart (born 1907)
- Chen Chung-hwan
- Guy Sircello
