= 1993 in philosophy =

1993 in philosophy

== Events ==
- Willard Van Orman Quine was awarded the Rolf Schock Prize in Logic and Philosophy "for his systematical and penetrating discussions of how learning of language and communication are based on socially available evidence and of the consequences of this for theories on knowledge and linguistic meaning - in particular the works From a Logical Point of View (1953), Word and Object (1960), and Pursuit of Truth (1990, 1992)".

== Publications ==
- Hans-Georg Gadamer, The Enigma of Health: The Art of Healing in a Scientific Age, 1993
- Norbert Wiener, Invention: The Care and Feeding of Ideas, 1993 (posthumously)
- Judith Butler, Bodies That Matter, 1993
- Jean-Luc Nancy, The Sense of the World, 1993 (originally published in French as Le sens du monde)
- Vernor Vinge, The Coming Technological Singularity, 1993
- Howard Rheingold, The Virtual Community, 1993

== Deaths ==
- February 5 - Hans Jonas, German-born American philosopher (born 1903)
- August 20 - Bernard Delfgaauw, Dutch philosopher (died 1993)
- November 19 - Kenneth Burke, American literary theorist and philosopher (born 1897)
