= 1990 in philosophy =

1990 in philosophy

== Publications ==
- Giorgio Agamben, The Coming Community (published in Italian as La comunità che viene in 1990; English translation: 1993)
- Ray Kurzweil, The Age of Intelligent Machines (1990)
- Judith Butler, Gender Trouble (1990)
- Jonathan Lear, Love and Its Place in Nature: A Philosophical Interpretation of Freudian Psychoanalysis (1990)

== Deaths ==
- January 26 - Lewis Mumford (born 1895)
- August 1 - Norbert Elias (born 1897)
- August 4 - Norman Malcolm (born 1911)
- August 18 - B. F. Skinner (born 1904)
- October 22 - Louis Althusser (born 1918)
- November 24 - Keiji Nishitani (born 1900)
