= 1998 in philosophy =

1998 in philosophy

== Events ==
- The Indian philosopher and economist Amartya Sen was awarded the 1998 Nobel Memorial Prize in Economic Sciences "for his contributions to welfare economics".
- The American philosopher Robert L. Holmes was appointed to the newly established Rajiv Gandhi Chair in Peace and Disarmament at Jawaharlal Nehru University in New Delhi, India.

== Publications ==
- Lewis White Beck, Essays by Lewis White Beck: Five Decades as a Philosopher (1998) Editor: Predrag Cicovaki
- Heinz von Foerster and Bernhard Pörksen, Wahrheit ist die Erfindung eines Lügners: Gespräche für Skeptiker (published in German in 1998; not yet published in English)
- John Searle, Mind, Language and Society: Philosophy in the Real World (1998)
- Alan Gewirth, Self-Fulfillment (1998)
- Alessandro Ferrara, Reflective Authenticity: Rethinking the Project of Modernity (1998)
- Robert Audi, Epistemology: A Contemporary Introduction to the Theory of Knowledge (1998)
- T. M. Scanlon, What We Owe to Each Other (1998)

== Deaths ==
- February 17 - Ernst Jünger (born 1895)
- March 3 - Marc Sautet (born 1947)
- April 21 - Jean-François Lyotard (born 1924)
