= 2011 in philosophy =

2011 in philosophy

== Events ==
- Hilary Putnam was awarded The Rolf Schock Prize in Logic and Philosophy "for his contribution to the understanding of semantics for theoretical and ‘natural kind’ terms, and of the implications of this semantics for philosophy of language, theory of knowledge, philosophy of science and metaphysics".

== Publications ==
- Alvin Plantinga, Where the Conflict Really Lies: Science, Religion, and Naturalism (2011)
- Daniel C. Dennett and Alvin Plantinga, Science and Religion: Are They Compatible? (2011)
- Stephen Greenblatt, The Swerve: How the World Became Modern (2011)
- Yuval Noah Harari, קיצור תולדות האנושות (Ḳitsur toldot ha-enoshut, Sapiens: A Brief History of Humankind, 2011)
- Michio Kaku, Physics of the Future (2011)
- Axel Honneth, Das Recht der Freiheit (2011; German; not yet translated into English)
- Richard Kraut, Against Absolute Goodness (2011)
- Martha Nussbaum, Creating Capabilities: The Human Development Approach (2011)
- Philip Kitcher, The Ethical Project (2011)
- Steven Nadler, A Book Forged in Hell: Spinoza's Scandalous Treatise and the Birth of the Secular Age (2011)
- Quentin Meillassoux, Philosophy in the Making (2011)
- Peter Sloterdijk, Bubbles: Spheres Volume I: Microspherology (2011)
- Susan Blackmore, Zen and the Art of Consciousness (2011)

== Deaths ==
- March 20 - Sara Ruddick (born 1935)
- April 17 - Gareth Matthews (born 1929)
- April 27 - Igor Kon (born 1928)
- May 30 - Marek Siemek (born 1942)
- June 12 - John Hospers (born 1918)
- July 8 - Adolfo Sánchez Vázquez (born 1915)
- July 22 - Dmitri Furman (born 1943)
- August 10 - Arnaud Desjardins (born 1925)
- October 8 - Arthur F. Holmes (born 1924)
- October 22 - Peter Goldie (born 1946)
- November 25 - Mihailo Đurić (born 1925)
- December 11 - Hans Heinz Holz (born 1927)
- December 15 - Christopher Hitchens (born 1949)
- December 24 - Bernard Gert (born 1934)
- December 27 - Michael Dummett (born 1925)
- December 31 - Alfonso Gómez-Lobo (born 1940)
