= Robert L. Holmes =

American philosopher (born 1935)

- Born: December 28, 1935 (age 90)
- Occupations: Professor, Scholar
- Known for: Ethics; Pacifism; Political Philosophy
- Board member of: Fellowship of Reconciliation
- Awards: National Humanitites Institute Fellowship; Fulbright Fellowship; Kroc Institute for International Peace Studies Fellowship

Academic background
- Education: Harvard University; University of Michigan
- Thesis: John Dewey's Ethics In The Light Of Contemporary Metaethical Theory (1961)

Academic work
- Sub-discipline: Philosophy of Nonviolence, Pragmatic Pacifism
- Institutions: University of Rochester
- Main interests: Ethics, Social philosophy, Philosophy of war, Pacifism
- Website: Robert-Holmes.com

Robert L. Holmes (December 28, 1935) is a Professor Emeritus of Philosophy at the University of Rochester. As an expert on issues of peace, nonviolence and pacifism Holmes specializes in ethics, social and political philosophy. He has written numerous articles and several books on those topics while arguing in support of a presumptive moral imperative against waging war in the modern era. Holmes has been invited to address several national conferences as well as international conferences at the United Nations.

== Early life ==
Holmes was raised in northern New York State by his parents who died when he was still in his teens. He graduated from Watertown High School in 1953 after serving as president of the student council, editor of the school magazine, and captain of a sectional championship cross country team. He also undertook studies in classical piano at the Watertown Conservatory of Music for ten years and won several awards while competing in New York City, Canada and Washington D. C.

Subsequently, Holmes earned his undergraduate degree in Philosophy cum laude from Harvard University in 1957. His honors thesis was "Plato's Concept of God". Soon thereafter he earned an M.A (1959) and Ph.D. (1961) in Philosophy from the University of Michigan, where his dissertation was on "John Dewey's Ethics in the Light of Contemporary Metaethical Theory."

== Career ==
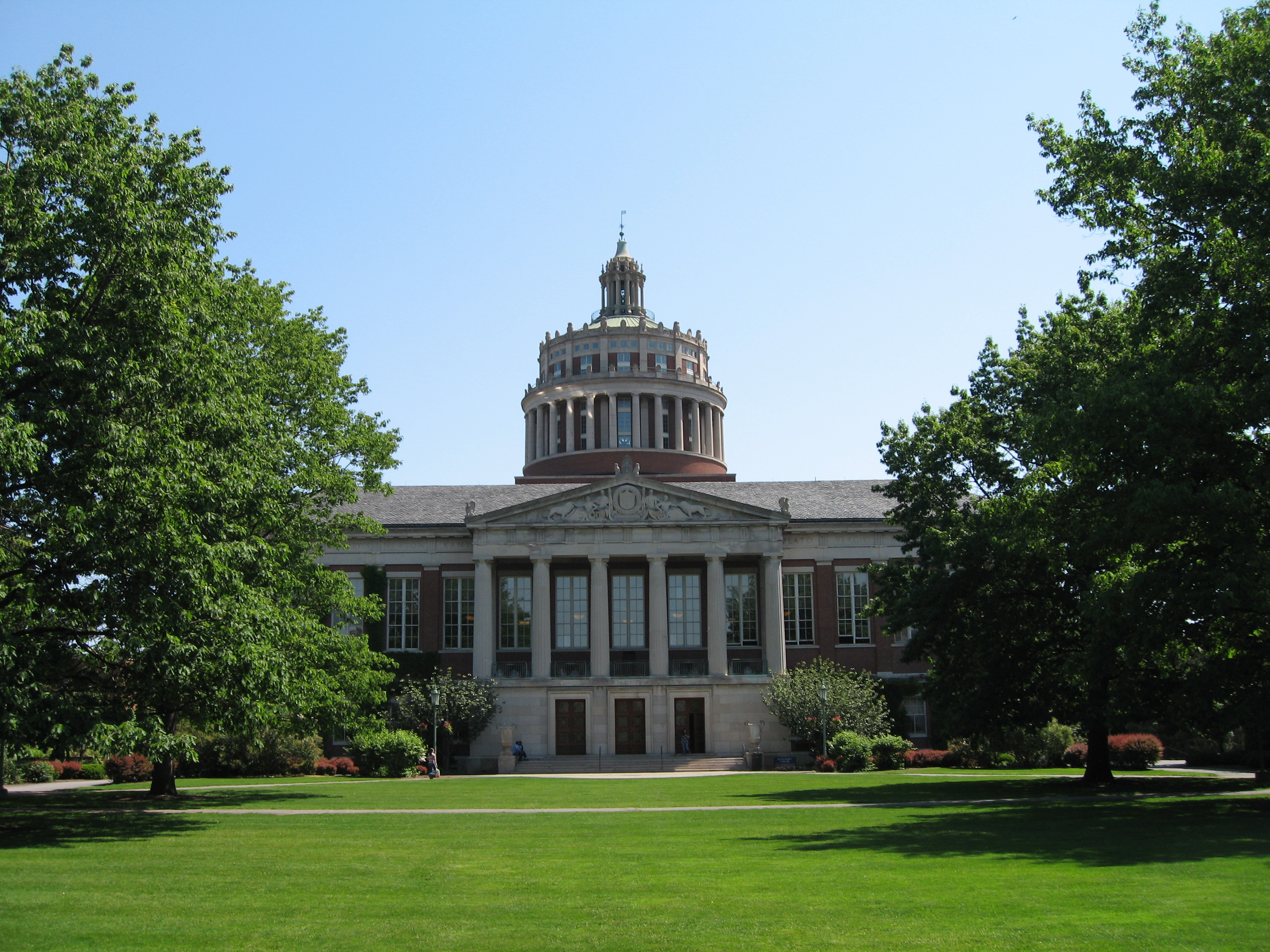
The Rush Rhees Library at University of Rochester, as seen from the Eastman Quadrangle.

Holmes joined the faculty at the University of Rochester in 1962. By 1976 he acquired a fellowship at the National Humanities Institute at Yale University. Subsequently, in 1982 he was appointed Senior Fulbright Lecturer at Moscow State university. He also served as a Faculty Fellow at the Kroc Institute for International Peace Studies at the University of Notre Dame in 1993. In 1998, Holmes was appointed to the newly established Rajiv Gandhi Chair in Peace and Disarmament at Jawaharlal Nehru University in New Delhi, India, where he shaped the mission of the chair on instruction, research, and lectures.

While serving on the faculty at the University of Rochester, his lectures were well regarded. Holmes was recognized for "being one of the very few professors to receive perfect or near perfect reviews every year since the university began student review services". He received the Edward Peck Curtis Award for Undergraduate Teaching in 2001 and the Professor of the Year Award in Humanities in 2006. At the 2007 convocation ceremony, Holmes was awarded the Goergen Award for Distinguished Achievement and Artistry in Undergraduate Teaching.

During the course of an academic career which has spanned over forty years, Holmes has held a variety of scholarly positions including: Fulbright Fellow at Moscow State University and a visiting professor at Notre Dame, Hamilton College as well as an instructor at the University of Texas at Austin. In addition, he served as an editor of the philosophical journal Public Affairs Quarterly (1995–1999), contributed to the editorial review boards of both Social Theory and Practice (1975–1995) and The Acorn: Journal of the Gandhi-King Society (1990–2003) and also participated on the national board of the Fellowship of Reconciliation. He was also a longtime adviser to the University of Rochester Undergraduate Philosophy Council. For several years he also served as the university's Acting Chairman of the Department of Philosophy (1972 & 1980–1981). In 1992 he also served as president of the professional organization Concerned Philosophers for Peace which strives to improve international understanding and peace through scholarly analysis of the causes of war.

External image
- Photograph of Professor Robert L. Holmes at the University of Rochester on Rochester.edu

Holmes is the author of several comprehensive texts on the subject of moral philosophy. Included among his publications is a collaborative work undertaken in 1968 with Lewis White Beck - a noted scholar on Kantian ethics (Philosophical Inquiry: An Introduction to Philosophy). Subsequently, in 2001 he served as a contributory author to the book Kant's Legacy: Essays in Honor of Lewis White Beck with an essay on Consequentialism and Its Consequences. He also coauthored a work in 2005 with Barry L. Gan - Director of the Center for Nonviolence at St. Bonaventure University (Nonviolence in Theory and Practice). In addition, he has published numerous papers in several academic peer-reviewed journals including: Analysis, Ethics, International Philosophical Quarterly, Journal of Medicine and Philosophy, Journal of Value Inquiry, Mind, The Monist, The Philosophical Forum, and The Review of Metaphysics.

Holmes is currently a professor emeritus at the University of Rochester but no longer instructs students on campus. In recent years, he has also lectured at the Permanent India Mission to the United Nations during its annual International Day of Nonviolence ("The Significance of Nonviolence in Today's World", 2017). Subsequently, he was also invited to address the United Nations General Assembly in 2021. However, due to the emergence of the COVID pandemic in New York City, his lecture was cancelled.

== Moral philosophy ==
Over the course of the past sixty years, Holmes has addressed several interrelated moral dilemmas posed in the modern age including terrorism, nuclear deterrence, pacifism and armed conflict in general. They are analyzed in depth in several of his peer-reviewed publications as well as in greater detail within the following texts.

=== Academic works ===
==== On War and Morality ====
In his book On War and Morality (1989) he offers a robust philosophical defense of pacifism and its application in a world which is plagued with recurrent outbursts of international violence despite its adherence to upholding the principles of nuclear deterrence and mutual assured destruction (MAD) since the emergence of the cold war era. Citing a Reductio ad Absurdum argument and a prudential argument, Holmes rejects a reliance upon such an irrational set of principles and dismisses them as morally wrong. Instead, he advances a form of "moral personalism" based upon the maxim that any intelligible moral theory must include an abiding interest in the lives and well-being of all people. In his view, violence is a form of abrogation of this maxim which is prima facia wrong and that Just War Theories in general are inadequate to the task of surmounting such a moral presumption.

Holmes offers a systematic critical review of the two major schools of thought which claim to defend warfare in the modern world. In the first group are the "positivistic realists" who claim that concepts of "right" or "wrong" are irrelevant in international affairs and the "normative realists" who claim that moral considerations should not be permitted to play a role in determining foreign policy. Holmes dismisses the later by observing that they have misread the history of the twentieth century by suggesting that Wilsonian idealism inevitably led to the onset of World War II and confuse morality with moralism.

In the second group, Holmes identifies the defenders of just war theories. Holmes rejects their attempts to justify the taking of innocent human lives in order to save other innocent human lives as morally unjustifiable in so far as both killing and any appeal to violence is morally unjustified in the first place, despite the consequences which may follow from such an act. Even if a war is considered "just" in accordance with the standards of when a country may go to war (Jus ad bellum) or how a country conducts a war (Jus in bello, it may not be deemed morally acceptable based upon a consideration of the organized violence which it engenders in the modern world. In Holmes' view, all considerations of the logical necessity to use any military means in order to successfully wage war in accordance with Jus ad bellum are superseded by the moral requirement to avoid killing innocents which are embodied within the moral constraints of jus in bello. As Holmes reminds his readers,

"To justify going to war...that is to establish jus ad bellum in the first place, requires showing that what one would be doing by waging it is justified. (178)"

With this in mind, Holmes outlines a four-stage argument to support the view that warfare is unjustified even within the context of modern world conditions. First he observes that warfare in general cannot be justified if the means of waging the war are, when taken by themselves, also morally unjustified. As Holmes reminds his readers, "One is justified in performing an act only if he is justified both in employing the means necessary to its performance and in performing any subsidiary acts constitutive of it." Secondly, he contends that modern warfare by its very nature inevitably involves the killing of innocent people. Thirdly, he denies that the presumption against killing innocent people can be overridden by conditions related to the waging of war. Lastly, he identifies nonviolence as an embodiment of a viable alternative to warfare. Specifically, he outlines a Gandhian approach to resolving conflicts, which rejects the utilization of mutual concessions in order to achieve a provisional or temporary standoff between the waring parties. This is replaced with a process of actively creating peace through negotiations which engender mutual progress for all parties involved in the conflict. Taken together, these arguments suggest that an appeal to nonviolence is a viable ethical alternative even within the modern world.

In a peer-reviewed journal, it was noted that '"this is a carefully written and closely argued book, and a major contribution to our understanding of morality and war." Another reviewer noted that, "...This is a piece of genuine scholarship; much of the analysis is original and the argumentation highly sophisticated. .. A thoughtful and thought-provoking call for pacifism in this decidedly militaristic age...deserves a wide audience."

==== Basic Moral Philosophy ====
In this text, Holmes offers a comprehensive review of several topics central to the development of ethical theory within the western philosophical tradition. Included among them are: "The Nature of Ethics", "Theories of Moral Right and Wrong", "Virtue in Ancient Philosophy", "Virtue and Happiness", "Ethical and Psychological Egoism", "The Divine Command Theory", "Natural Law Ethics", '"Kantianism", "Consequentialism", "Justice", "Ethical Relativism", "Can Moral Principles be Justified", "The Nature of Moral Judgements", and "Feminist Ethics". Also included is a detailed analysis and review of Plato's ancient "Euthyphro dilemma" and the vexing ethical question, "Does God command what is right because it is right or is it (what is right) because God commands it?"

==== Pacifism: A Philosophy of Nonviolence ====
In his more recent book, Pacifism: A Philosophy of Nonviolence Holmes offers a supplement to the analysis presented above. Here, Holmes ventures beyond philosophical considerations of how to best distinguish between just wars and unjust wars in particular and presents an analysis of what he describes as a more "basic moral question" by exploring the general case of whether war is ever morally permissible. This is accomplished by examining the concept of warfare from a more global perspective, as opposed to concentrating primarily on the particular subjective perceptions of "just" or "unjust" outcomes which may prevail among the combatants. With this in mind, he offers a critical review of the "constellation of social, political, economic, religious and ethical values and practices" which are required to wage war systematically over time. His analysis suggests that the framework for the conventional Just War tradition is flawed precisely because it ignores the presumptive immorality of the "massive, systematic and deliberate killing of human beings" during war. He concludes by arguing that a prima facie presumption against warfare in general is sufficiently compelling in the modern era due to a variety of factors including: the killing of both innocent and non-innocents alike, the inevitable displacement of large populations of people, along with the inevitable harm done to both animal life and the environment in the long term. Stated more simply, "To be a pragmatic pacifist one need only hold that the large-scale, organized and systematic violence of war is impermissible in today's world." In Holmes view, this is entirely consistent with a new form of "existential pacifism".

==== "Tolstoy On War" ====
In his essay "Tolstoy On War" (2024), Holmes collaborated with the contemporary philosopher Predrag Cicovacki to present an analysis of Leo Tolstoy's specific views on the historical impact of warfare as well as the irrationality and morality of waging war in general. In reference to the "irrationality of war", Holmes argues that Tolstoy is critical of humanity's repeated attempts to romanticize or glorify war. In Holmes's view, Tolstoy frames his criticism by underscoring the brutal, chaotic and irrational human motives which prevail during war despite the presence of orderly, rational calculations which are designed to achieve specific military strategies.

Holmes also argues that Tolstoy is fundamentally skeptical of any appeal to a "Great Man Theory" during the practice of waging war. With this in mind, Holmes points toward Tolstoy's rejection of the assumption that specific powerful generals or commanders such as Napoleon are truly capable of exercising control over far reaching and vast historical events through the practice of war.

Holmes concludes by presenting a review of Tolstoy's philosophical pacifism, while underscoring Tolstoy's belief that the presence of institutionalized violence in warfare is a reflection of structures within society which underlie widespread suffering.

== Publications ==
- You may preview selections from Holmes' book Nonviolence in Theory and Practice on archive.org

=== Texts ===
Included among Robert L. Holmes publications are the following texts:

- Philosophic Inquiry: An Introduction to Philosophy by Lewis White Beck and Robert L. Holmes, (1968)
- On War and Morality by Robert L. Holmes, (1989)
- An Encyclopedia of War and Ethics. Editor: Donald A. Wells. Contributor: Robert L. Holmes - "Justice, Can Both Sides Have?" (1996)
- The Augustinian Tradition Editor: Gareth B. Matthews. Contributor: Robert L. Holmes - "St. Augustine and the Just War Theory" (1999)
- Kant's Legacy: Essays in Honor of Lewis White Beck Editor: Predrag Cicovacki. Contributor: Robert L. Holmes -"Consequentialism and its Consequences". (2001)
- Social and Political Philosophy: Contemporary Perspectives, Ed. Sterba, James P. Contributor: Robert L. Holmes - "Pacifism for Nonpacifists". (2001)
- Nonviolence in Theory and Practice by Robert L. Holmes and Barry L. Gan, (2005)
- The Ethics of Nonviolence - Essays by Robert L. Holmes by Robert L. Holmes, Editor: Predrag Cicovacki, (2013)
- Basic Moral Philosophy by Robert L. Holmes, (2014)
- Pacifism: A Philosophy of Nonviolence by Robert L. Holmes, (2016)
- Introduction to Applied Ethics by Robert L. Holmes, (2018)
- Tolstoy and Spirituality Editors Predrag Cicovacki, Heidi Nada Grek. Contribuor Robert L. Holmes - "Tolstoy's Spiritual Nonviolence" (2018)
- Tolstoy's War and Peace: Philosophical Perspectives. Editor Predrag Cicovacki. Contributor Robert L. Holmes - "Tolstoy On War" (2024)

=== Journal articles ===
Selected peer-reviewed articles published by Robert L. Holmes include:

- "The Case Against Ethical Naturalism". Mind (1964):291-295
- "The Development of John Dewey's Ethical Thought". The Monist(1964):392-406
- "John Dewey's Moral Philosophy in Contemporary Perspective". The Review of Metaphysics (1966):42-70
- "Some Conceptions of Analysis In Recent Ethical Theory". Metaphilosophy (1971):1-28
- "John Dewey's Social Ethics". The Journal of Value Inquiry (1973):274-280
- "On Pacifism". The Monist (1973):489-506
- "The Concept of Physical Violence In Moral and Political Affairs". Social Theory and Practice (1973):387-408
- "University Neutrality and ROTC". Ethics(1973):177
- "Is Morality a System of Hypothetical Imperatives?". Analysis (1974):96-100
- "State-Legitimacy and the Obligation to Obey the Law". Virginia Law Review (1981):133-141
- "The Limited Relevance of Analytical Ethics to the Problems of Bioethics." The Journal of Medicine and Philosophy (1990):143-159
- "Sexual Harassment and the University". Academic Ethics (1996):499-518
- "Just War: Principles and Causes". International Philosophical Quarterly(1997):483-484
- "The Metaethics of Pacifism and Just War Theory". Philosophical Forum Quarterly (2015):2-15

== See also ==
- Nonviolence
- Mahatma Gandhi
- Pacifism
- Kantian ethics
