= 2005 in philosophy =

== Events ==
- Jaakko Hintikka was awarded the Rolf Schock Prize in Logic and Philosophy "for his pioneering contributions to the logical analysis of modal concepts, in particular the concepts of knowledge and belief".
- Robert L. Holmes collaborates with Barry L. Gan in the book Nonviolence in Theory and Practice (Waveland Press, 2005)

== Publications ==
- Graham Harman, "Guerrilla Metaphysics: Phenomenology and the Carpentry of Things" (2005)
- Michel Onfray, Atheist Manifesto (2005)

== Deaths ==
- February 3 - Ernst Mayr (born 1904)
- March 11 - Harry Prosch (born 1917)
- May 20 - Paul Ricœur (born 1913)
