= 2002 in philosophy =

2002 in philosophy

== Events ==
- The philosophy magazine Think was founded in 2002.
- In 2002, the first World Philosophy Day was introduced by the United Nations Educational, Scientific and Cultural Organization to "honour philosophical reflection in the entire world by opening up free and accessible spaces" and "to encourage the peoples of the world to share their philosophical heritage and to open their minds to new ideas, as well as to inspire a public debate between intellectuals and civil society on the challenges confronting our society".

== Publications ==
- Karl-Otto Apel, Diskursethik und Diskursanthropologie (published in German in 2002, not yet translated into English)
- Bernard Williams, Truth and Truthfulness: An Essay in Genealogy (2002)
- Colin McGinn, The Making of a Philosopher: My Journey Through Twentieth-Century Philosophy (2002)
- Manuel de Landa, Intensive Science and Virtual Philosophy (2002)
- Steven Pinker, The Blank Slate (2002)
- Stephen Wolfram, A New Kind of Science (2002)
- Derrick Jensen, The Culture of Make Believe (2002)
- Nick Bostrom, Anthropic Bias: Observation Selection Effects in Science and Philosophy (2002)
- Susan Neiman, Evil in Modern Thought: An Alternative History of Philosophy (2002)
- Leonard Lawlor, Derrida and Husserl: The Basic Problem of Phenomenology

== Deaths ==
- January 23 - Pierre Bourdieu (born 1930)
- January 23 - Robert Nozick (born 1938)
- January 29 - R. M. Hare (born 1919)
- March 13 - Hans-Georg Gadamer (born 1900)
- July 25 - Abdel Rahman Badawi (born 1917)
- October 2 - Heinz von Foerster (born 1911)
- October 2 - Norman O. Brown (born 1913)
- November 24 - John Rawls (born 1921)
- December 2 - Ivan Illich (born 1926)
