= 2015 in philosophy =

2015 in philosophy

== Publications ==
- Peter Carruthers, The Centered Mind: What the Science of Working Memory Shows Us About the Nature of Human Thought (Oxford University Press).
- Noam Chomsky - What Kind of Creatures Are We?
- Michel Foucault - About the Beginning of the Hermeneutics of the Self: Lectures at Dartmouth College, 1980
- Byung-Chul Han - The Burnout Society
- Byung-Chul Han - The Transparency Society
- John Marenbon – Pagans and Philosophers: The Problem of Paganism from Augustine to Leibniz
- Michel Onfray – Cosmos. Une ontologie matérialiste
- Michael Shermer - The Moral Arc

== Deaths ==
- February 1 – Irving Singer, US academic and author, 89
- March 1 – Georg Kreisel, Austrian-born mathematical logician, 91
- May 9 – Odo Marquard, German philosopher, 87
- May 27 – Michael Martin, US philosopher and academic, 83
- August 8 – Abner Shimony, US physicist and philosopher of science, 87
- August 12 – Jaakko Hintikka, Finnish philosopher and logician, 86
- December 13 – Benedict Anderson, social historian, cultural critic, Asian studies scholar, writer (Imagined Communities).
