= 2006 in philosophy =

2006 in philosophy was important for a number of events and publications.

== Publications ==
- Harry Frankfurt, On Truth (2006)
- Luc Ferry, Learning to Live (2006)
- Paul Boghossian, Fear of Knowledge (2006)
- André Comte-Sponville, The Book of Atheist Spirituality (originally published in French as L'Esprit de l'athéisme, 2006)
- Jonathan Lear, Radical Hope: Ethics in the Face of Cultural Devastation (2006)
- Joshua Foa Dienstag, Pessimism: Philosophy, Ethic, Spirit (2006)
- Roger Crisp, Reasons and the Good (2006)
- Lee Smolin, The Trouble with Physics (2006)

== Deaths ==
- February 4 - Betty Friedan (born 1921)
- February 13 - P. F. Strawson (born 1919)
- March 27 - Stanisław Lem (born 1921)
- May 16 - Colin Murray Turbayne (born 1916)
- July 30 - Murray Bookchin (born 1921)
- July 8 - Raja Rao (born 1908)
- August 1 - Iris Marion Young (born 1949)
