= 2009 in philosophy =

2009 in philosophy was marked by some significant publications by, and deaths of, well-known philosophers.

== Publications ==
- Jonathan Safran Foer, Eating Animals (2009)
- David Foster Wallace, This Is Water (2009)
- Catherine H. Zuckert, Plato's Philosophers: The Coherence of the Dialogues (2009)
- Elijah Millgram, Hard Truths (2009)
- Irving Singer, Philosophy of Love: A Partial Summing-Up (2009)
- Christine Korsgaard, Self-Constitution: Agency, Identity, and Integrity (2009)
- Brian Hines, Return to the One: Plotinus's Guide to God-Realization (2009)
- Christopher S. Hill, Consciousness (2009)

== Deaths ==
- January 12 - Arne Næss (born 1912)
- March 10 - Brian Barry (born 1936)
- March 16 - Marjorie Grene (born 1910)
- April 5 - Neil MacCormick (born 1941)
- May 14 - Benson Mates (born 1919)
- June 3 - Julius Moravcsik (born 1931)
- July 1 - David Pears (born 1921)
- July 17 - Leszek Kołakowski (born 1927)
- August 5 - Gerald Cohen (born 1941)
- September 13 - William Alston (born 1921)
- October 30 - Claude Lévi-Strauss (born 1908)
- December 4 - Stephen Toulmin (born 1922)
