= 2003 in philosophy =

2003 in philosophy

== Events ==
- Solomon Feferman was awarded the Rolf Schock Prize in Logic and Philosophy "for his works on the arithmetization of metamathematics, transfinite progressions of theories, and predicativity".

== Publications ==
- T. M. Scanlon, The Difficulty of Tolerance (2003)
- Gayatri Chakravorty Spivak, Death of a Discipline (2003)
- Terry Eagleton, After Theory (2003)
- Peter Gärdenfors, How Homo Became Sapiens (2003)
- Hannah Arendt, Responsibility and Judgment (published posthumously in 2003)

== Deaths ==
- February 20 - Maurice Blanchot (born 1907)
- June 10 - Bernard Williams (born 1929)
- June 16 - Georg Henrik von Wright (born 1916)
- August 30 - Donald Davidson (born 1917)
- September 25 - Edward Said (born 1935)
- October 30 - Richard Clyde Taylor (born 1919)
