= Rolf Schock Prizes =

Philosophy prizes established by Rolf Schock

The Rolf Schock Prizes were established and endowed by bequest of philosopher and artist Rolf Schock (1933–1986). The prizes were first awarded in Stockholm, Sweden, in 1993 and, since 2005, are awarded every three years. It is sometimes considered the equivalent of the Nobel Prize in Philosophy. Each recipient receives SEK 600,000 (approximately US$55,000).

The Prizes are awarded in four categories and decided by committees of three of the Swedish Royal Academies:

- Logic and Philosophy (decided by the Royal Swedish Academy of Sciences)
- Mathematics (decided by the Royal Swedish Academy of Sciences)
- Visual Arts (decided by the Royal Swedish Academy of Fine Arts)
- Musical Arts (decided by the Royal Swedish Academy of Music)

== Laureates in Logic and Philosophy ==
Year	Name(s)	Country
1993	Willard V. Quine	United States
1995	Michael Dummett	United Kingdom
1997	Dana S. Scott	United States
1999	John Rawls	United States
2001	Saul A. Kripke	United States
2003	Solomon Feferman	United States
2005	Jaakko Hintikka	Finland
2008	Thomas Nagel	Yugoslavia / United States
2011	Hilary Putnam	United States
2014	Derek Parfit	United Kingdom
2017	Ruth Millikan	United States
2018	Saharon Shelah	Israel
2020	Dag Prawitz and Per Martin-Löf	Sweden; Sweden
2022	David Kaplan	United States
2024	Hans Kamp and Irene Heim	Germany/ Netherlands; United States
2026	Bas van Fraassen	Netherlands/ United States

== Laureates in Mathematics ==
Year	Name(s)	Country
1993	Elias M. Stein	United States
1995	Andrew Wiles	United Kingdom
1997	Mikio Sato	Japan
1999	Yurij Manin	Russia
2001	Elliott H. Lieb	United States
2003	Richard P. Stanley	United States
2005	Luis Caffarelli	Argentina
2008	Endre Szemerédi	Hungary / United States
2011	Michael Aschbacher	United States
2014	Yitang Zhang	United States
2017	Richard Schoen	United States
2018	Ronald Coifman	United States
2020	Nikolai G. Makarov	Russia / United States
2022	Jonathan S. Pila	Australia
2024	Lai-Sang Young	United States
2026	Tobias Colding	Denmark

== Laureates in Visual Arts ==
Year	Name(s)	Country
1993	Rafael Moneo	Spain
1995	Claes Oldenburg	Sweden / United States
1997	Torsten Andersson	Sweden
1999	Jacques Herzog and Pierre de Meuron	Switzerland
2001	Giuseppe Penone	Italy
2003	Susan Rothenberg	United States
2005	Kazuyo Sejima and Ryue Nishizawa	Japan
2008	Mona Hatoum	Lebanon / United Kingdom
2011	Marlene Dumas	South Africa / Netherlands
2014	Anne Lacaton and Jean-Philippe Vassal	France
2017	Doris Salcedo	Colombia
2018	Andrea Branzi	Italy
2020	Francis Alÿs	Belgium
2022	Rem Koolhaas	Netherlands
2024	Steve McQueen	United Kingdom
2026	Arno Brandlhuber	Germany

== Laureates in Musical Arts ==
Year	Name(s)	Country
1993	Ingvar Lidholm	Sweden
1995	György Ligeti	Hungary / Austria
1997	Jorma Panula	Finland
1999	Kronos Quartet	United States
2001	Kaija Saariaho	Finland
2003	Anne Sofie von Otter	Sweden
2005	Mauricio Kagel	Argentina
2008	Gidon Kremer	Latvia
2011	Andrew Manze	United Kingdom
2014	Herbert Blomstedt	Sweden / United States
2017	Wayne Shorter	United States
2018	Barbara Hannigan	Canada
2020	György Kurtág	Hungary
2022	Víkingur Ólafsson	Iceland
2024	Oumou Sangaré	Mali
2026	Maria Schneider	United States

== See also ==
- Fields Medal
- Kyoto Prize in Arts and Philosophy
- Astrid Lindgren Memorial Award
- Nevanlinna Prize
- Nobel Prize
- Polar Music Prize
- Right Livelihood Award
- Turing Award
- Lists of awards
- List of European art awards
- List of mathematics awards
