= 2004 in philosophy =

2004 in philosophy

== Events ==
- Jürgen Habermas was awarded the Kyoto Prize in Arts and Philosophy for his "achievements in social philosophy, in particular [the] establishment of the communicative action theory and discourse ethics, and its application in practical activities for a public-minded ideal society".
- The Holberg Prize was inaugurated in 2004.

== Publications ==
- Harry G. Frankfurt, The Reasons of Love (2004)
- Seyla Benhabib, The Rights of Others (2004)
- Charles Larmore, The Practices of the Self (2004)
- Galen Strawson, Against Narrativity (2004)
- James Giles, The Nature of Sexual Desire (2004)

=== Philosophical literature ===
- Pascal Mercier, Night Train to Lisbon (2004)

== Deaths ==
- May 9 - Alan Gewirth (born 1912)
- July 28 - Francis Crick (born 1916)
- October 9 - Jacques Derrida (born 1930)
- December 28 - Susan Sontag (born 1933)
