= Resentment =

Emotion consisting of a mixture of disappointment, disgust and anger

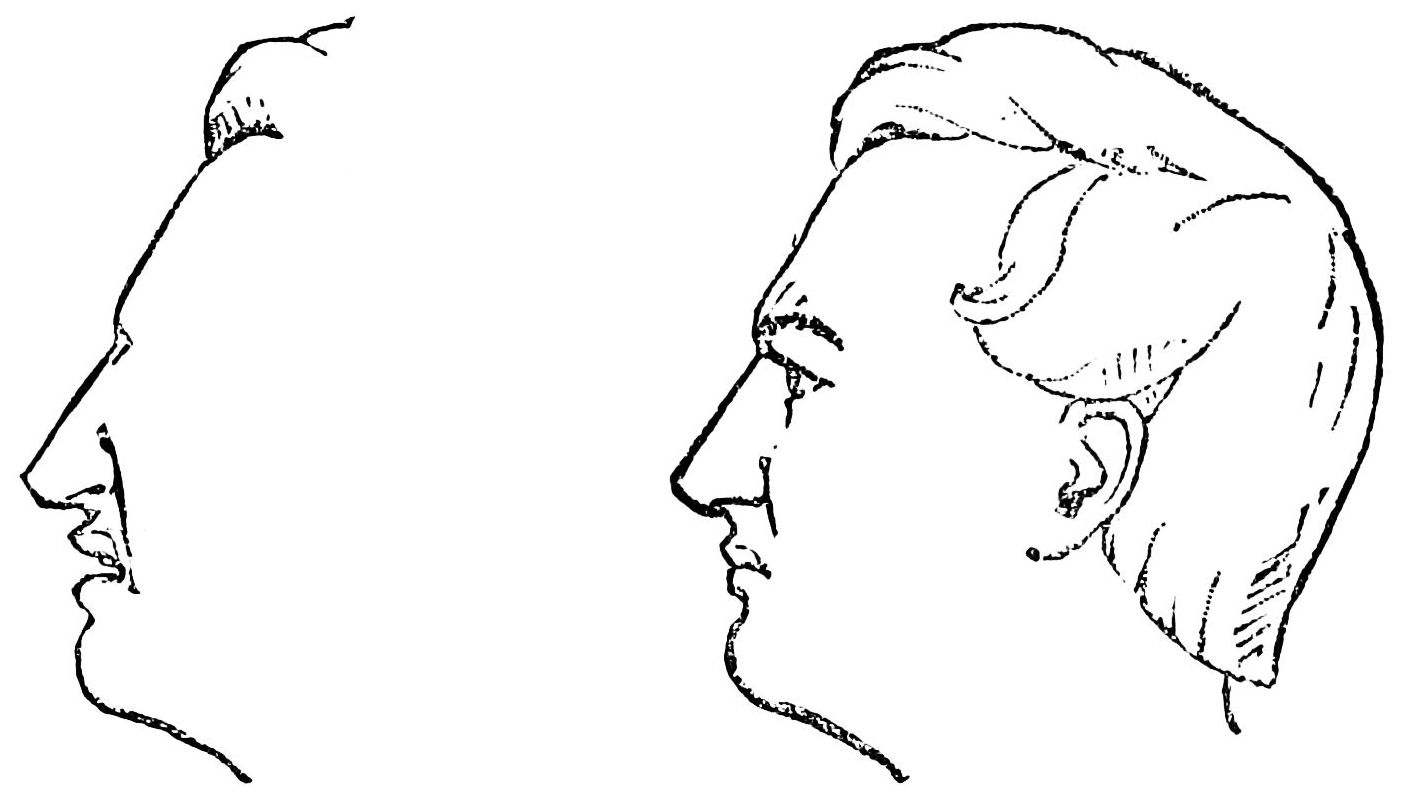
Facial expressions of bitterness

Resentment (also called ranklement or bitterness) is a complex, multilayered emotion that has been described as a mixture of disappointment, disgust, and anger. Other psychologists consider it a mood or as a secondary emotion (including cognitive elements) that can be elicited in the face of insult or injury.

Inherent in resentment is a perception of unfairness (i.e. from trivial to very serious), and a generalized defense against unfair situations (e.g. relationships or unfavourable circumstances).

The word originates from French "ressentir", re-, intensive prefix, and sentir "to feel"; from the Latin "sentire". The English word has become synonymous with anger, spite, and holding a grudge.

== Causes ==
Resentment can result from a variety of situations involving a perceived wrongdoing from an individual, which are often sparked by expressions of injustice or humiliation. Common sources of resentment include publicly humiliating incidents such as accepting negative treatment without voicing any protest; feeling like an object of regular discrimination or prejudice; envy/jealousy; feeling used or taken advantage of by others; and having achievements go unrecognized, while others succeed without working as hard. Resentment can also be generated by dyadic interactions, such as emotional rejection or denial by another person, deliberate embarrassment or belittling by another person, or ignorance, putting down, or scorn by another person.

Resentment can also develop, and be maintained by: focusing on past grievances (i.e. disturbing memories of hurtful experiences) continuously, or by trying to justify the emotion (i.e. with additional thoughts/feelings). Thus, resentment can occur as a result of the grief process and can be sustained by ruminating.

== Function ==
Resentment has healthy and unhealthy aspects.

Alice MacLachlan writes "What we resent reveals what it is we value, and what we have come to expect (or hope) from others; it may also reveal to what we see ourselves as entitled {to}: that is, how our expectations of our surroundings are organized and measured." Indeed, she goes on to further write that only an amoral person (a person who didn't have values or concern for the well-being of self or others) could not experience resentment.

Resentment can also function to warn against further, future, harmful and unfair situations from occurring again (its focus is on the future). Resentment, used as a form of distrust, has a strong component of self-punishment: "the false appeal of self-punishment is that it seems to keep us safe from future hurt and disappointment", when in reality it is hurting the resenter more (i.e. how we mistreat or distrust others unrelated to the offense, ourselves, etc.).

Resentment has also been conceptualized as a form of protest: "More specifically, resentment protests a past action, that persists as a present threat". The 'present threat' being that the past harmful action(s), makes a claim: that you can be treated this way, or that such treatment is acceptable; It poses a threat, and in resenting it, you challenge that claim (i.e. protest). "Resentment affirms what the {offenders'} act denies"- its harmfulness and the victim's worth. Pamela Hieronymi claims the object of protest is the past event, rather than the offender of the event: claiming that resentment need not develop into malice or a desire for retribution (if resentment is focused on the past harmful situation or event, rather than the person who caused it).

Resentment, when it is unhealthy, can come in the form of: hostile anger with a retaliation motive (i.e. fantasizing about putting someone down, devaluing, or paying someone back for a perceived injury), time duration (which can go on for days, weeks, or even years), or when too many resentments are held; Thus, draining resources, creating stress, and draining positive emotions.

== Physical expression ==
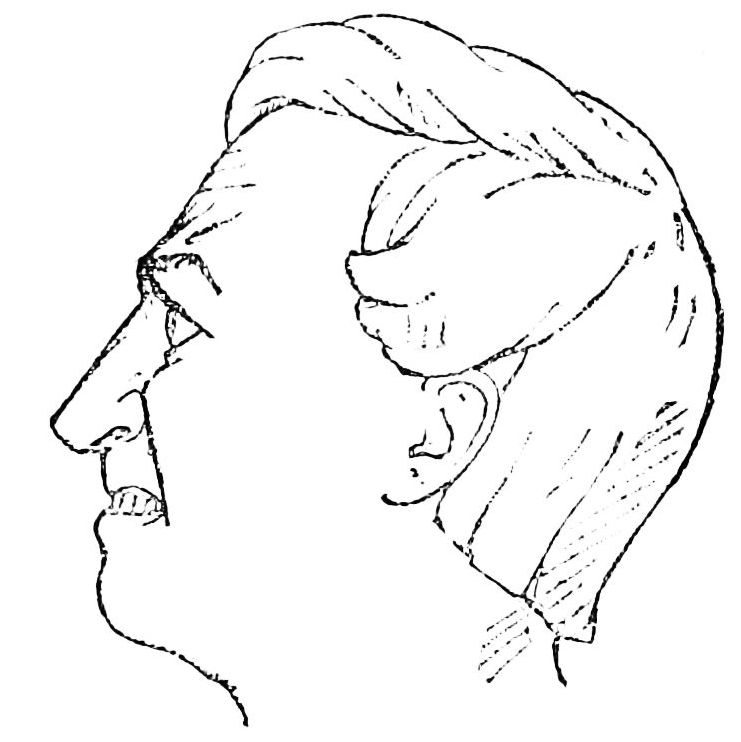
A pinched and bitter facial expression

Unlike many emotions, resentment does not have physical tags exclusively related to it that telegraph when a person is feeling this emotion. However, physical expressions associated with related emotions such as anger and envy may be exhibited, such as furrowed brows or bared teeth.

Resentment can be self-diagnosed by looking for signs such as the need for emotion regulation, faking happiness while with a person to cover true feelings toward them, or speaking in a sarcastic or demeaning way to or about the person. It can also be diagnosed through the appearance of agitation- or dejection-related emotions, such as feeling inexplicably depressed or despondent, becoming angry for no apparent reason, or having nightmares or disturbing daydreams about a person.

== Internal experience ==
Resentment is most powerful when it is felt toward someone whom the individual is close to or intimate with. To have an injury resulting in resentful feelings inflicted by a friend or loved one leaves the individual feeling betrayed as well as resentful, and these feelings can have deep effects.

Resentment can have a variety of negative results on the person experiencing it, including touchiness or edginess when thinking of the person resented, denial of anger or hatred against this person, and provocation or anger arousal when this person is recognized positively. It can also have more long-term effects, such as the development of a hostile, cynical, sarcastic attitude that may become a barrier against other healthy relationships; lack of personal and emotional growth; difficulty in self-disclosure; trouble trusting others; loss of self-confidence; and overcompensation.

Chronic resentment (i.e. for a prolonged period of time) can also lead to unhealthy symptoms, such as the constriction of nerve endings in one's muscles (causing chronic, low-grade muscle and back-pain). Such long-lasting resentment can also cause destruction of T cells (lowering the immune system), hypertension (which increases the threat of stroke and heart attack), cancer, (drug) addictions, depression, and shortened life span.

== Coping ==
To further compound these negative effects, resentment often functions in a downward spiral. Resentful feelings cut off communication between the resentful person and the person they feel committed the wrong, and can result in future miscommunications and the development of further resentful feelings. Because of the consequences they carry, resentful feelings are dangerous to live with and need to be dealt with. Resentment is an obstacle to the restoration of equal moral relations among persons.

Resentment and spite also share a connection of self-harm, yet differ primarily in the way they are expressed. Resentment is unique in that it is almost exclusively internalized, where it can do further emotional and psychological damage but does not strongly impact the person resented. By contrast, spite is exclusively externalized, involving vindictive actions against a (perceived or actual) source of wrong. Spiteful actions can stem from resentful feelings, however.

Psychologist James J. Messina recommends five steps to facing and resolving resentful feelings: (1) Identify the source of the resentful feelings and what it is the person did to evoke these feelings; (2) develop a new way of looking at past, present and future life, including how resentment has affected life and how letting go of resentment can improve the future; (3) write a letter to the source of the resentment, listing offenses and explaining the circumstances, then forgive and let go of the offenses (but do not send the letter); (4) visualize a future without the negative impact of resentment; and (5) if resentful feelings still linger, return to Step 1 and begin again.

Post-traumatic embitterment disorder has been linked to resentment, in some cases.

== Comparison with anger ==
Robert C. Solomon, a professor of philosophy at the University of Texas at Austin, places resentment on the same continuum as anger and contempt, and he argues that the differences between the three are that resentment is anger directed toward a higher-status individual; anger is directed toward an equal-status individual; and contempt is anger directed toward a lower-status individual.

Steven Stosny makes an analogy, distinguishing the functions of anger and resentment, as: anger being a fire-extinguisher meant to 'put-out' and prevent immediately harmful situations, from becoming more harmful, while resentment is more like a smoke-alarm: something that is always 'on' (and requires energy and emotions to sustain this alarm-system), and is meant to protect us if, just in case, someone or something harmful from past experience shows up. Resentment and anger differ primarily in the way they are externally expressed. Anger results in aggressive behavior, used to avert or deal with a threat, while resentment occurs once the injury has been dealt and is not expressed as aggressively or as openly.

Another differentiation between anger and resentment is as follows: anger is about the immediate situation (to back off or submit), whereas resentment is a defensive way to mentally punish (or in the more extreme case, to devalue) yourself, or the remembered offender. Another differentiation is that resentment is rarely (if ever) about a single specific stimulus: even after behavioural changes have been made (i.e. accountability has been addressed) or the stimulus is no longer present (i.e. situation is no longer encountered) resentment can still be present. Whereas anger is triggered by a specific stimulus, and usually reduces in intensity as the stimulus attenuates (or is no longer present).

== Comparison with conviction ==
An important feature of acting on resentment is that it is against something (i.e. unfairness, injustice, abuse, situations that threaten values or well-being). Whereas, acting on conviction is for something (i.e. justice, well-being of self or others, or any other values held by an individual as important). The distinction is important, when acted upon, because while acting for one's deeper values creates actions consistent with one's values, acting against things (or people) one does not value does not necessarily lead to actions that are consistent with one's deeper values (i.e. retribution, murder). Self-reflection can help determine which of the two that one is acting on, by stating why the behavior is consistent with one's deeper values: if one's answer represents conviction, it will reflect one's deeper values; if it is resentful it will devalue someone or something.

== Philosophical perspectives ==
- Heraclitus said "We have to be faster in calming down a resentment than putting out a fire, because the consequences of the first are infinitely more dangerous than the results of the last; fire ends burning down some houses at the most, while the resentment can cause cruel wars, with the ruin and total destruction of nations."
- Max Scheler considered resentment as the product of weakness and passivity.
- Nietzsche saw resentment as an ignoble emotion underlying Rousseau-esque Romanticism - "for under all romanticism lie the grunting and greed of Rousseau's instinct for revenge".
- Philosopher Robert C. Solomon wrote extensively on the emotion of resentment and its negative effects on those who experience it. Solomon describes resentment as the means by which man clings to his self-respect. He wrote that it is in this moment when humanity is at its lowest ebb.

Scheler was instrumental in Ressentiment thought.

== Alcoholism and bigotry ==
Alcoholics Anonymous (AA) cites resentment as the number one offender, and one of the greatest threats to an alcoholic. The Twelve Steps of AA involve identifying and dealing with resentment as part of the path toward recovery, including acknowledging one's own role in resentment and praying for the resentment to be taken away. The inventory that AA suggests for processing resentments is to first inventory the resentment by identifying what person, institution, or principle one is angry at, then to identify why one is angry, what instincts of self are affected by the resentment. Finally, disregarding the other person involved entirely, the alcoholic looks for their own mistakes, where they are to blame and where they have been at fault: where has the alcoholic been selfish, self-seeking, dishonest, or frightened? After writing and sharing an inventory, unselfish, constructive action is taken.

Resentment can also play a role in racial and ethnic conflicts. Resentment is cited as having infected the structure of social value, and is thus a regular catalyst in conflicts sparked by inequality. It can also be one of the emotions experienced during class conflict, particularly by the oppressed social class.

== Literary examples ==
- The writer Norman Douglas confessed to a habit of borrowing money, like D. H. Lawrence; but unlike Lawrence, Douglas was able to hide "the primary reaction: resentfulness…. We object to being patronized; it makes us resentful".
- Sociologist Zygmunt Bauman discusses resentment: "Both Nietzsche and Scheler point to ressentiment as a major obstacle to loving the Other as thyself. (While they wrote in German, they used the French term ressentiment, the complex meaning of which is less than perfectly conveyed by the more straightforward English term "resentment").

== See also ==
- Anger
- Acceptance
- Cynicism
- Forgiveness
- Grief
- Mimpathy
- Moral emotions
- Moral injury
- Remorse
- Revenge
- Social emotions
- Suffering
