= Vicarious cognitive dissonance =

Negative arousal or discomfort in an individual observing others in their in-group

Vicarious cognitive dissonance (also vicarious dissonance) is the state of negative arousal in an individual from observing a member of their in-group behave in counterattitudinal ways. The phenomenon is distinguished from the type of cognitive dissonance proposed by Leon Festinger, which can be referred to as personal cognitive dissonance, because the discomfort is experienced vicariously by an observer rather than the actor engaging in inconsistent behavior. Like personal cognitive dissonance, vicarious cognitive dissonance can lead to changes in the observer’s attitudes and behavior to reduce psychological stress.

== Origins ==
Vicarious cognitive dissonance was first proposed and demonstrated in a series of three closely related studies by Norton et al. (2003). Drawing upon social identity theory, the researchers tested the hypothesis that dissonance could be felt through witnessing attitude-discrepant behavior from an in-group member that one identifies with. The researchers used the induced compliance paradigm to measure attitude change in undergraduates after participants were led to believe they observed an in-group or out-group member act in support of a measure affecting tuition amounts or logistics.

- Study 1 found that participants changed their attitudes towards the measure only after they heard an in-group member give the speech, and the magnitude changes increased in the participants’ level of self-identification with the in-group.
- Study 2 clarified that attitude change comes from witnessing the agreement to act in counterattitudinal ways and ruled out other explanations, such as persuasion effects or differences in information processing from listening to an in-group member. Participants did not actually hear a speech, and their attitudes did not change when the group member expressed agreement with the speech position.
- Study 3 showed that participants’ attitude change occurred and was strongest under conditions known to induce personal cognitive dissonance: free choice of the actor to behave in such a way and the chances that the behavior leads to undesirable outcomes.

In addition to connecting attitude to factors associated with cognitive dissonance, Study 3 also measured participants’ personal affect, defined as how they felt, and their vicarious affect, defined as how they would feel if they were the group member. Only the participants’ vicarious discomfort measures were positively correlated with their attitude changes, and there was no relationship between the personal discomfort ratings and attitude change.

While Norton et al. (2003) was the first to suggest that cognitive dissonance may act vicariously on people through social identities, early cognitive dissonance research also involved social groups and interpersonal interactions. Festinger, Riecken and Schachter (1956) studied the role of social support in preserving and increasing the strength of disconfirmed beliefs that were dissonant with real events, and Festinger and Carlsmith (1959) measured cognitive dissonance in participants paid to lie and persuade another person that the tasks they completed were interesting.

== Theory ==
The theory of vicarious cognitive dissonance combines social identity theory, self-categorization theory, and personal cognitive dissonance theory. Individuals self-categorize into social groups and adopt aspects of the group’s social identity into their self-concepts. Individuals who seek out social identities to reduce identity uncertainty may take on more prototypical traits, attitudes, and behaviors of the group. This self-categorization process depersonalizes the self and increases identification with other group members. These conditions allow for intersubjectivity to arise within the group where members share each other’s cognitive perspectives. Intersubjectivity is the proposed mechanism through which individuals vicariously experience discomfort from other group members’ actions.

Festinger’s theory of cognitive dissonance proposed that people have a drive for internal consistency and so vicarious dissonance comes from the individual’s desire for consistency within their social identities. Witnessing in-group members behave in hypocritical ways threatens the benefits from identifying with that group by casting doubt on the desirability of membership or by increasing uncertainty around the group’s attitudes and values. Both methods reduce the positive self-affirming effects of self-categorization and social consensus. However, to arouse vicarious dissonance, the actor must be perceived as freely choosing to engage in the inconsistent behavior. This condition for vicarious dissonance is similar to models of cognitive dissonance theory that require some level of personal responsibility or consequences for the self-concept, such as the New Look and Self-standards models. The observers must also believe there are undesirable consequences from the actor's behavior, and these consequences must be important to the observer to generate dissonance.

Vicarious dissonance is more akin to sympathy than empathy in that it requires others to understand and imagine the discomfort the actor feels. It may also be a more ego-centric phenomenon than sympathy given that it appears to have a greater effect when participants are asked how they would feel if they were the actor versus when they are asked how the actual actor feels. The individual may engage in the methods commonly used to reduce personal dissonance with the distinction that the observer can only modify their own cognitions and behaviors and not those of the actor. Adjusting one’s attitudes is one of the easier ways to reduce vicarious dissonance.

There have been several proposed reasons why observers would adjust their attitudes or behaviors in response to deviations from an in-group member instead of casting out that member as a black sheep. One theory was that individuals were adjusting to new group norms expressed by the actor; however, it has been shown that observers who experience vicarious cognitive dissonance do not necessarily believe that the actor’s true beliefs had changed after performing the counterattitudinal behavior. Another proposal was the desire to reaffirm cohesion and desired qualities of the group identity such as honesty and integrity. This idea has some empirical support where affirming personal or group identities prior to exposure to a hypocritical in-group member lessened the effects on observers' attitudes. Observers have also been shown to defend the hypocritical members, suggesting that desires to provide social support to the in-group member may motivate the changes in observers.

== Moderating factors ==
Beyond the conditions of actor's free choice and potential negative consequences, several factors can moderate the strength of vicarious cognitive dissonance:

=== In-group identification ===
Identification with the in-group has been shown to increase degree of behavioral and attitude change in an observer responding to vicarious dissonance. Higher identification with the in-group increases intersubjectivity between the observer and the discrepant actor, which increases the experience of negative arousal and need to restore consonance. Unlike prototypicality, high identification does not require that the person embody the most central traits of the social group.

=== Prototypicality ===
The prototypicality of both the observer and the actor influences intersubjectivity and the strength of resulting vicarious cognitive dissonance. The magnitude of dissonance is highest when both individuals are highly prototypical of the relevant social group. Greater prototypicality is associated with better integration of shared social identity to each person's self-concept and also increases the perceived similarity between actors and observers. Vicarious dissonance is also potent when the observer and actor are both low in prototypicality for particular social group, which suggests that they share a strong social bond through their outsider or marginalized status.

=== Self-concept interdependence ===
The degree of interdependence in one’s self-concept, partially shaped by one's cultural norms, can give rise to vicarious cognitive dissonance through the emphasis on connections with and responsibilities to others. Greater dependence of the self is proposed to increase identity fusing with the in-group. Which consequences are considered undesirable and to what extent can also vary with one's views of their own agency and role in social contexts. Studies of cognitive dissonance in an interdependent culture were more likely to show effects when the inconsistent behavior had interpersonal consequences than when they only had personal consequences. Vicarious dissonance has also been shown to have effects in a collectivist setting while personal cognitive dissonance did not.

=== Social identity salience ===
The psychological salience of a particular social identity affects when people feel vicarious dissonance. People belong to multiple social groups, and depending on situational context, one identity may be more salient than another. That identity’s increased ease of accessibility influences if observers identify with the actor and if intersubjectivity can provoke dissonance in the observer. Priming individuals to think about their cultural backgrounds can increase attitude change in response to vicarious cognitive dissonance when the activated identity is more collectivist in nature.

=== Attributions ===
The observer’s attributions of their physical discomfort affect their responses to the vicarious dissonance. Observers have to identify the negative arousal and correctly attribute these feelings to an internal source. Allowing observers to misattribute the source of their feelings to external factors can lessen the extent to which they modified their behavior to align with the hypocritical statements.

== Implications ==
Vicarious cognitive dissonance may be a useful tool for implementing a variety of interventions, such as those related to health-behaviors. Studies have shown vicarious dissonance in participants who listened to speeches advocating sunblock use by an in-group member who was revealed to have engaged in prior hypocritical behavior. Listeners exposed to the speaker's hypocrisy were more likely to increase their future intentions to use sunblock or the likelihood of redeeming coupons for free sunblock. The phenomenon may also hold potential for large-scale interventions because the same inconsistent behavior can lead to simultaneous changes in multiple observers.

Vicarious dissonance is activated through observation, so it has implications for attitude and behavioral change in variety of social contexts that do not involve direct interactions between the observer and actor (e.g., mass media, social media, etc.). One study suggests that media viewers feel vicarious cognitive dissonance when an actor they have formed a parasocial relationship with plays characters whose on-screen behaviors contradict the actor's beliefs. Early research has shown that even just imagining rather than directly observing an in-group member act in a counterattitudinal manner may be sufficient for negative arousal, but further work in the area of imaginary vicarious dissonance is needed.

== See also ==
- Group cohesiveness
- Groupthink
- In-group favoritism
- Social contagion
