= Problems of a Sociology of Knowledge =

1924 book by Max Scheler

- Title page for Problems of a Sociology of Knowledge (1980 edition)
- Author: Max Scheler
- Original title: Probleme einer Soziologie des Wissens
- Language: German
- Subject: Sociology of knowledge
- Publisher: Duncker & Humblot
- Publication date: 1924
- Publication place: Germany
- English publication date: 1980
- Media type: Print (Paperback)
- Pages: 239

Problems of a Sociology of Knowledge (German: Probleme einer Soziologie des Wissens) is a 1924 essay by the German philosopher, sociologist, and anthropologist Max Scheler. It reappeared in expanded form in Scheler's 1926 book Die Wissensformen und die Gesellschaft. It was translated into English by Manfred S. Frings and published by Routledge & Kegan Paul in 1980.

== See also ==
- Sociology of knowledge
