= Ressentiment (book) =

1912 book and philosophical concept by Max Scheler

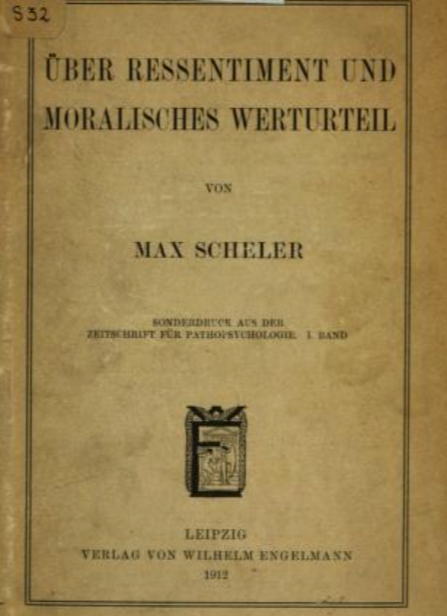
- Author: Max Scheler
- Original title: Über Ressentiment und moralisches Werturteil
- Language: German
- Publication date: 1912
- Text: Ressentiment at Enciclopedia Mercabá

Max Scheler (1874–1928)

Ressentiment (full German title: Über Ressentiment und moralisches Werturteil) is a 1912 book by Max Scheler (1874–1928), who is sometimes considered to have been both the most respected and neglected of the major early 20th-century German Continental philosophers in the phenomenological tradition. His observations and insights concerning "a special form of human hate" and related social and psychological phenomenon furnished a descriptive basis for his philosophical concept of "Ressentiment." As a widely recognized convention, the French spelling of this term has been retained in philosophical circles so as to preserve a broad sense of discursive meaning and application. Scheler died unexpectedly of a heart attack in 1928 leaving a vast body of unfinished works. Extrapolations from his thoughts have always since piqued interest and discussion on a variety of topics. His works were on the Nazi book burn list.

As a concept belonging to the study of ethics, Ressentiment represents the antithetical process of Scheler's emotively informed informal ethics of values. But Ressentiment can also be said to be, at once, his darkest as well as his most psychological and sociological of topics, foreshadowing many later findings in those particular social sciences.

Folk wisdom comes closest to Scheler's meaning by recognizing Ressentiment as a self-defeating turn of mind which is non-productive and ultimately a waste of time and energy. Maturity informs most of us that sustained hatred hurts the hater far more than the object of our hate. Sustained hatred enslaves by preventing emotional growth from progressing beyond the sense of pain having been precipitated, in some way, by whom or what is hated (i.e., another person, group or class of persons).

== Background ==
It is difficult to imagine the intellectual concern of the late 19th and early 20th century over the collective drift in Western civilization away from old-guard monarchical and hierarchical societal structures (i.e., one's station in life being determined primarily by birth), toward the relative uncertainty and instability embodied in such Enlightenment era ideals as democracy, nationhood, class struggle (Karl Marx), human equality, humanism, egalitarianism, utilitarianism, and the like. As such, Ressentiment, as a phenomenon, was first viewed as a pseudo-ethically based political force enabling the lower classes of society to rise in their situation in life at the (perceived) expense of the higher or more inherently "noble" classes. Hence, Ressentiment first emerged as what some might view a reactionary and elitist concept by today's democratic standards; while others of a more conservative mind-set might view Ressentiment as liberalism disguised as a socialist attempt at usurping the role of individual responsibility and self-determination. In any event, Scheler's contributions regarding this topic can not be fully appreciated without some cursory reference to the thought of Friedrich Nietzsche (1844–1900).

Friedrich Nietzsche used the term Ressentiment to explain this emerging degenerative morality issuing from an underlying existential distinction between what he saw as the two basic character options available to the individual: the Strong (the "Master") or the Weak (the "Slave"). The Master-type fully accepts the burdens of freedom and decides a path of self-determination. The Slave, rather than deciding to be the authentic author of their own destiny, chooses a repressed unsatisfying mode of life, blaming (by projection) his submissiveness, loss of self-esteem and pitiful lot in life upon the dominant Master figure (and their entire social class) who by contrast seems to flourish at every moment. A true enough assessment, given that economic exploitation always seems to lie at the heart of any intrinsic Master / Slave social arrangement, along with the Master class "washing their hands" (so to speak) of the burdens of social responsibility. This underlying Ressentiment forms the underlying rationale for a code of conduct (e.g., passive acceptance of abuse, fear of reprisal for asserting personal rights due to implied intimidation, or inability to enjoy life) belonging to the Slave-type or class ("Slave Morality").

Nietzsche was an atheist and harbored a particular disdain for Christianity, which he viewed as playing a key role in supporting Slave Morality. In supporting the Weak and disadvantaged of humanity, Christianity undermined the authority, social position and cultural progress of the Strong. Nietzsche viewed the progress of such Slave Morality as a sort of violation of the natural order and a thwarting of the authentic advancements of civilization available only through the Strong. This view of a "natural order", so typical of 19th-century Europe (e.g., Darwin's Theory of Evolution) is expressed in Nietzsche's principle – Will to Power. Scheler, by comparison, ultimately viewed the universal salvic nature of Christian love as contradicting Nietzsche's assessments, and in later life developed an alternative metaphysical dualism of Vital Urge (Note: "...the lowest stratum of psychic being is the presence of an unspecified, undifferentiated, blind 'urge forward' (Drang). It is completely unconscious and therefore without inner or outer sensation. This urge reveals itself as a slow 'towards' and 'away from' (e.g., towards light) and it must first be attributed to plant life. It is at the same time the 'vapor' (Dampf), which is at the bottom of all life, driving forward all life up to its highest manifestations.") and Spirit: (Note: "...the essential difference between animal and man is the presence of Spirit (Geist), which makes human life highly independent of drives, and independent of attachment to environment (in contrast to the basically environment-stricken animal).... This is clear when we consider that man forms his own environment in social life and history as well as in using artificial means to change it for better adjustment and comfort.... Spirit elevates man above world and above himself (as organic being).... Spirit, then, cannot have its foundation or source in this objective world, but only in the primordial principal of the cosmos (Urgrund) itself.") Vital Urge as closely allied to Will to Power, and Spirit as dependent yet truly distinct in character.

Contrary to Nietzsche's ultimate intent, much of his legacy ultimately led to an implosion of objectivity in which (i) truth became relative to individual perspective, (ii) "might ultimately made right" ("Social Darwinism"), and (iii) ethics would become subjective and solipsistic.

By contrast, Scheler, who also was sceptical over the historically emerging unchecked power of mass culture and the prevalence and leveling power of mediocrity upon ethical standards and upon the individual human person (as a unique sacred value), was nonetheless a theistic ethical objectivist. For Scheler, the phenomenon of Ressentiment principally involved Spirit (as opposed to Will to Power, Drives or Vital Urge), which entailed deeper personal issues involving distortion of the objective realm of values, the self-poisoning of moral character, and personality disorder.

== Basic features of Ressentiment ==
Scheler's described Ressentiment in his 1913 book by the same title as follows:

"…Ressentiment is a self-poisoning of the mind which has quite definite causes and consequences. It is a lasting mental attitude, caused by the systematic repression of certain emotions and affects which, as such, are normal components of human nature. Their repression leads to the constant tendency to indulge in certain kinds of value delusions and corresponding value judgments. The emotions and affects primarily concerned are revenge, hatred, malice, envy, the impulse to detract and spite."

Although scholars do not agree on a fixed number or attributes materially defining Ressentiment, they have nonetheless collectively articulated about ten authoritative and insightful points (frequently combining them) which stake out the boundaries of this concept:

1) Ressentiment must first and foremost be understood in relation to what Scheler termed the a priori hierarchy of value modalities. While the direction of personal transcendence and ethical action is one towards positive and higher values, the direction of Ressentiment and unethical action is one towards negative and lower values. Scheler viewed values as emotively experienced with reference to the aforementioned universal, objective, constant and unchanging hierarchy. From lowest to highest, these modalities (with their respective positive and corresponding negative dis-value forms) are as follows: sensual values of the agreeable and the disagreeable; vital values of the noble and vulgar; mental (psychic) values of the beautiful and ugly, right and wrong and truth and falsehood; and finally values of the Holy and Unholy of the Divine and Idols. Ressentiment represents the dark underside, or inversion, of Scheler's vision of a personal and transformational non-formal ethics of values.

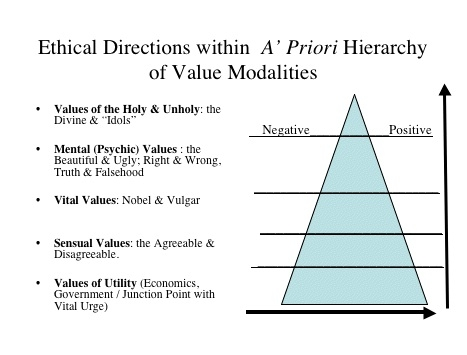

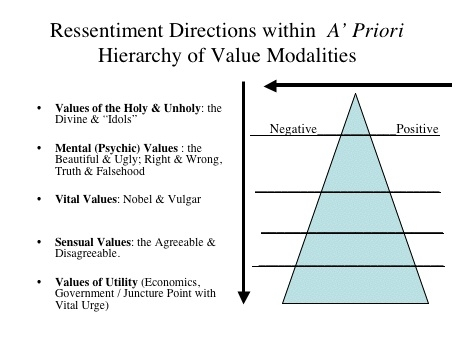

2) Ressentiment, as a personal disposition, has its genesis in negative psychic feelings and feeling states which most people experience as normal reactive responses to the demands of social life: i.e., envy, jealousy, anger, hatred, spite, malice, joy at another's misfortune, mean-spirited competition, etc. The objective sources of such feeling states responses might be occasioned by almost anything: e.g., personal criticism, ridicule, mockery, rejection, abandonment, etc.

For the individual person, the ethical and psychological issue becomes how the energy from these feeling states will be channeled so as to better benefit the individual person and society.

3) Ressentiment is highly situational in character in that it always involves "mental comparisons" (value-judgments) with other people who allegedly have no such Ressentiment feelings, and who likewise exhibit genuinely positive values. Hence, although Ressentiment might begin with something like admiration and respect, but surely ends in a sort of coveting of those personal qualities and goods of another: i.e., advantages afforded by their beauty, intelligence, charm, wit, personality, education, talent, skills, possessions, wealth, work achievement, family affiliation and the like. This early stage of Ressentiment resembles what we might refer to today as an inferiority complex.

However, one can easily extend this notion of "comparing" to externally acquired qualifiers having the potential for negative valuations which also tend to a support consumer based economics: i.e., status symbol possessions (a lavish house, or car), expensive fashion accessories, special privileges, club memberships, plastic surgery and the like. This principle is expressed in our common colloquialism of "Keeping up with the Joneses'". The subliminal result of all of these "comparisons" tends to lend credence the idea that one's self-concept, self-image, self-esteem, worth or social desirability is linked to one's social inclusion or exclusion in a favoured superior class having the means to insulate themselves from the rest of society.

4) Ressentiment, as situational, also typically extends to inherent social roles. Many social roles involve relationships frequently occasioning some level of inter-personal value-judgment with accompanying negative psychic feelings and feeling states which suggest dominant and submissive roles, not unlike Nietzsche's Master-Slave dichotomy. For example:

- The subordinate and/or submissive gender roles assigned to woman in terms of sexuality, child rearing and nurturing tasks.
- Generational Divides ("Generation Gaps"): The rejection of a younger generation by members of an older generation, due to the latter's inability to accept their own changes and to move beyond the value pursuits proper to those preceding stages of life. Also, the reverse is true. The rejection of an older generation by members of a younger generation due to the latter's inability to accept the fact that the older generation understands and sympathizes with the challenges they face.
- Progressive forms of inter-family and blended-family relations: e.g., younger siblings towards the elders' sense of entitlement; the hyper-critical mother-in-law towards the daughter-in-law;, or even the more contemporary abandonment of an ex-spouse in favour of a "trophy wife" or "trophy husband" as a status symbol signaling an increase in social status; the relational neglect towards children from a previous marriage over ones of the current; the reactions of peer friends and family to a romantic relationship involving partners of vastly different ages; the pathetic efforts of a mediocre ne’er-do-well child to live up to the standards of a successful high achieving parent, etc.
- The classic employee / employer adversarial relationships.

5) Ressentiment triggers a tendency in people which Scheler termed "Man's Inherent Fundamental Moral Weakness": a sense of hopelessness which pre-disposes a person to regress and seek surrogates of lower value as a source of solace.

When personal progress becomes stagnant or frustrated in moving from a negative to a more positive plateau given a relatively high vital or psychic level of value attainment, there is an inherent tendency towards regression in terms of indulgence in traditional vices and a host of other physical and psychological addictions and self-destructive modes of behaviour (e.g., the use of narcotics). This tendency to seek surrogates to compensate for a frustration with higher value attainment inserts itself into the scenario of consumerist materialism as an insatiable self-defeating need "to have more" in order to fill the void of our own philosophical bankruptcy and spiritual poverty.

== Essential structures of Ressentiment proper: "pathological ressentiment" ==
Further refining Ressentiment, Scheler wrote:

"Through its very origin, ressentiment is therefore chiefly confined to those who serve and are dominated at the moment, who fruitlessly resent the sting of authority. When it occurs elsewhere, it is either due to psychological contagion—and the spiritual venom of ressentiment is extremely contagious – or to the violent suppression of an impulse which subsequently revolts by "embittering" and "poisoning" the personality."

Hence, certain advanced characteristics of Ressentiment link this phenomenon to what we might refer to today as personality disorders. As such, Ressentiment Proper ("pathological ressentiment’) is not materially linked exclusively to issues of socio-economic status, but rather cuts across all socio-economic strata of society to include even the most powerful.

6) In Pathological Ressentiment a sense of impotence develops on the part of those experiencing ressentiment-feelings, especially if situational and social factors weigh so heavily so as render a person unable to release or resolve negative psychic feelings and feeling states in a positive and constructive manner: what we refer to today in psychological terms as repression.

Originally understood, Ressentiment is defused whenever one has the power and ability to physically retaliate, or act out, against an oppressor. For example, an ancient Roman citizen, as Master, could be expected to take revenge straightaway upon his Slave while the reverse would be unthinkable. "When [negative psychic feelings and feeling states] can be acted out, no ressentiment results. But when a person is unable to release these feelings against the persons or groups evoking them, thus developing a sense of impotence, and when these feelings are continuously re-experienced over time, then ressentiment arises."

But for Scheler, the essence of impotence as characteristic of Pathological Ressentiment has less to do with the actual presence of an external oppressor, and more to do with a self-inflicted personal sense of inadequacy over limitations in the face of positive value attainment itself. Hence, Ressentiment-feelings tend to be continuously re-experienced over time in a self-perpetuating manner, primarily fueled by a sense of inadequacy felt within the self which the "other" really only occasions. For example, one can have every advantage in life given them, yet prove to lack the talent for achieving the goals set for him or her self.

These re-experienced feelings of impotence become rationalized on a subconscious level as knee-jerk attitudinal projections: i.e., prejudices, bias, racism, bigotry, cynicism and closed-mindedness.

Noteworthy is the "abstract" focus of Ressentiment: the fact that specific individuals (i.e., the "Master figure" or their counterpart, the "Slave figure") are no longer even required for Ressentiment feelings and their rationalized forms of expression to continue and drive forward. One only needs a representative member of the class of one's focus of resentment to be represented in some way. "Members of a group can become random targets of hate, borne out of impotence that seeks to level the group." Such a random formal treatment of "otherness" offers a plausible explanation for hate crimes, serial killings (in part), genocide, the general framing of an enemy in faceless non-human terms, as well as any top-down or bottom-up form of class warfare agenda, etc. Hence, there must be a psychic distancing of de-personalization between Master and Slave perceptions of "the other" in order for Ressentiment to operate effectively.

7) Pathological Ressentiment entails "Value-Delusion". Value Delusion is "a tendency to belittle, degrade, dismiss or to ‘reduce’ genuine values as well as their bearers." However, this is done in a distinctively non-productive manner because "ressentiment does not lead to affirmation of counter-values since ressentiment-imbued persons secretly crave the values they publicly denounce." This aspect of Value Delusions represents a horizontal shift of value judgment concerning things and the world from a positive to a more negative orientation. What was once loved or thought of as good becomes devalued as "sour grapes" or "damaged goods" in the mind of the Ressentiment-imbued person, and what was previously lacking in value is now elevated to the status of acceptable.

In spite of this decidedly negative direction, "the ressentiment-subject is continuously 'plagued' by those distractions of unattainable values in that they emotionally replace them with disvalues issuing forth from their impotence. In the background of such an illusory and self-deceiving over-turning of positive values with illusory negative valuations there still remains transparency of the true objective order of values and their ranks." Hence, the demands of Value-Delusion manifest in what we commonly refer to as a superiority complex, i.e., arrogance, hubris, hypocrisy, employment of double standards, denial, revenge, and self-projection of one's own negative qualities on to the opposition.

Correspondingly, negative feeling states suggest the absence, repudiation or flight from positive values. But nonetheless, negative values do not stand on their own intrinsic merit: they always refer back in some way to correspondingly positive values. Emotionally, Value Delusion turns happiness to sadness, compassion to hate, hope to despair, self-respect to shame, love and acceptance to rejection (or worse, competition), resolve to dread, and so on down throughout the human emotional strata. Delusion is essential for the Ressentiment-imbued person in order to maintain any semblance of mental homeostasis.

8) Pathological Ressentiment ultimately manifests as "Metaphysical Confusion". Metaphysical Confusion is a form of Value Delusion in which the value shift is more vertical in character, in relation to the a priori hierarchy of value modalities. In this dimension, Value Delusion occurs as a sort of twisting, or false inversion, of the value hierarchy wherein higher value-contents and bearers are viewed as lower, and lower as higher. Today, we commonly refer to this phenomenon as "Having one's priorities out of order." Scheler illustrated such an inversion in his analysis of Western civilization's humanistic, materialistic and capitalistic propensities to elevate utility values above those of vital values. Carried to the logical extreme, "Ressentiment brings its most important achievement when it determines a whole "morality," perverting the rules of preference until what was "evil" appears "good".

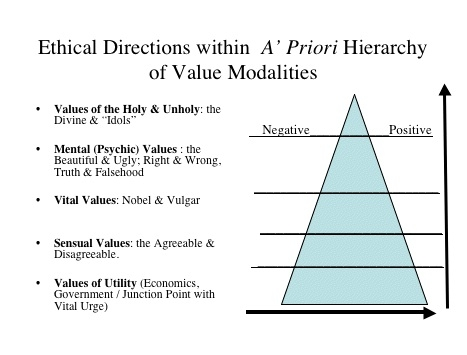
Click on to enlarge

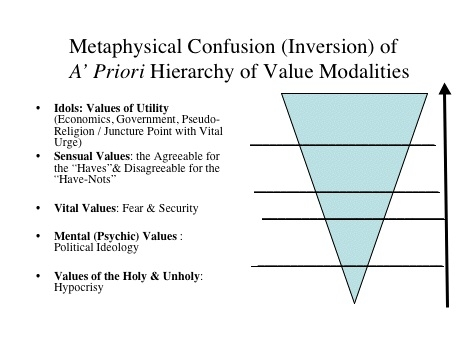
Click on to enlarge

9) Pathological Ressentiment ultimately results in a deadening (psychological numbing) of normal sympathetic feeling states, as well as all higher forms of psychic and spiritual feelings and feeling states. As opposed to a pure well-ordered emotive life (ordo amoris) appropriate to the ethical person as created in God's image through love (ens amans), Pathological Ressentiment emotively results in a disordered heart (de’ordre du coeurs), or what we might commonly refer to as a "hardened heart."

For Scheler, morality finds expression in response to "the call of the hour", or exercise of personal conscience, which is based in the heart's proper order of love (ordo amoris) in relation to positive and higher values. By contrast, Ressentiment with its corresponding Value-Delusions wilfully favours varying degrees of a disordered heart (d’ordre du coeur) and twisted emotions consistent with personality disorders. For example, it is precisely the failure to feel for and identify with their victims (even to the extent of deriving sadistic pleasure) which characterizes the sociopath, the psychopath, the serial killer, the dictator, the rapist, the bully, the corrupt CEO and the ruthless drug dealer all share this same common denominator. Common Law would refer to this quality as "cold-blooded".

Author Erick Larson in his book Devil in the White City renders with great precision a literary description of this deadening of higher feeling states in reference to America's first serial killer, Herman Webster Mudgett, a.k.a. Dr. H.H. Holmes

"…Holmes was charming and gracious, but something about him made Belkamp [the antagonist] uneasy. He could not have defined it. Indeed for the next several decades alienists [early psychologists] and their successors would find themselves hard-pressed with any precision what it was about men like Holmes that caused them to seem warm and integrating but also telegraph the vague sense that some important element of humanness was missing. At first alienists described this condition as "moral insanity" and those who exhibited the disorder as "moral imbeciles." They later adopted the term "psychopath"…as a "new malady" and stated, "Besides his own person and his own interests, nothing is sacred to the psychopath."

The Ressentiment-Imbued person exercises such a pronounced psychic distance from his victims so as to never fully achieve the desired lasting satisfaction produced though their own unethical actions. "Retaliation" of this sort no longer yields any good, and "expression" of this sort lacks all possibility of positive results. "In true ressentiment there is no emotive satisfaction but only a life-long anger and anguish in feelings that are compared with others."

Unfortunately, in general, our particular era suffers from a pronounced inability to feel higher levels of vital psychic (intellectual and sympathetic) and spiritual feeling states. For example, the process of our legal system tends to convert the absolute character of moral sentiments to a "blameless" game of negotiation of cost vs. benefits. Can we even imagine the moral education furnished by such archaic practices as the stockade or tar and feathering so as to invoke real public humiliation for crimes? In addition, we as a culture have become so desensitized to feelings of outrage over public persons of power and stature lacking in all feelings of shame over their wrongdoings that our greatest moral problem becomes one of complacency.

== Ressentiment and wider societal impact ==
10) Finally, Pathological Ressentiment bears a particular relation to the Socio-Political Realm by virtue of, what Scheler describes as man's lowest form of social togetherness, "Psychic Contagion". Psychic Contagion is the phenomenon of uncritically "following the crowd", or mob mentality, like lemmings charging over a cliff. Positive examples are good-natured crowds in a pub or at sporting events; a negative example, violent rioting. As a concept, Psychic Contagion bears an affinity to Nietzsche's assessment of Slave-type mentality.

To the extent that the politically powerful (i.e., the "Master" faction or "Slave" faction of society, as the case might be) are able to stir up collective cultural animosities through the use of Psychic Contagion, they increase their ability to achieve their underlying socio-political objectives. Such methods usually take the forms of incendiary rhetoric, scapegoat tactics (e.g., anti-Semitism, homophobia, hatred towards welfare recipients and the disadvantaged, etc.), class warfare, partisan politics, propaganda, excessive secrecy/non-transparency, closed-minded political ideology, jingoism, misguided nationalism, violence, and waging unjust war.

The use of such methods of negative Psychic Contagion can be viewed as having propelled such historical figures or movements as the Nazis in 1930s and 40s Germany (genocide of the Jews and the Aryan Master Race agenda), or Trump and the Maga movement in the contemporary USA.

== Conclusions ==
It is a mistake to assess Scheler's concept of Ressentiment as chiefly a theory of psychological pathology, though surely it is that in part. In addition, Ressentiment is a philosophical and ethical concept from which to assess the spiritual and cultural health both of individual persons and society as a whole: a task which seems all the more urgent given economic globalization (i.e., a tendency toward carte blanche predatory capitalism). For example, it is entirely acceptable to view human ethical transcendence as complementary and commensurate with a bottom-up psychology of needs and drives so long as the arch of that qualitative direction is positive in nature. However, the reverse is false. Negative parallel aspects are irreducible to Scheler's top-down metaphysical principle of good as emanating from our personal development as spiritual beings. This distinction is illustrated by the many cases in which negative role models can, and do, emerge as highly self-actualized economically powerful individuals from a psychological standpoint (clearly "Superman" type persons), but who are entirely lacking from an ethical, social and spiritual standpoint: e.g., the drug king-pin or pimp as a person young boys admire and look up to, or the corrupt CEO who absconds with obscene bonuses while his company goes bankrupt and the employee pension fund disintegrates. These negative manifestations of values and value inversions demonstrate how the philosophical conception of Ressentiment rests upon qualitatively different grounds transcending science and pure economics.

For Scheler, Ressentiment is essentially a matter of self in relation to values, and only proximately an issue of social conflict over resources, power and the like (Master / Slave, or dominant / submissive relationships). For Scheler, what we call "having class", for instance, is not something as one-dimensional as power, money, or goods and services readily sold or purchased. Rather, like the array of a priori hierarchy of value modalities, "class" has to do with who you make of yourself as a person, which involves a whole range of factors, including moral character, integrity, talents, aptitudes, achievements, education, virtues (e.g., generosity), reciprocal respect among diverse individuals (active citizenship) and the like.

Since society must be guided by the rule of law above power, we must promote government which relies upon fairness (See John Rawls) and egalitarian principles in terms of channeling our national economic forces. Self-interest (as in Adam Smith's "invisible hand") is humanity's (and nature's) most highly efficient means of positively converting a Vital Urge into human economic benefits-—the point at which "the rubber hits the road"—but it is also a force highly susceptible to greed. Therefore, governments must ensure that such raw pursuit of utility value is not purely an end in itself, but must serve primarily to form an economic base upon which genuine value strata and culture can take root and flourish for the common good as well as everyone's respective individual needs. We should realize that living with less materially does not diminish in any way our access to greater emotional, intellectual, artistic and spiritual fulfilment. Only in such ways can virtue truly become its own reward.

== See also ==
- Max Scheler
- Ressentiment
- Master-slave morality
- A Theory of Justice (John Rawls)
