= Black sheep =

Idiom for oddness or disreputability

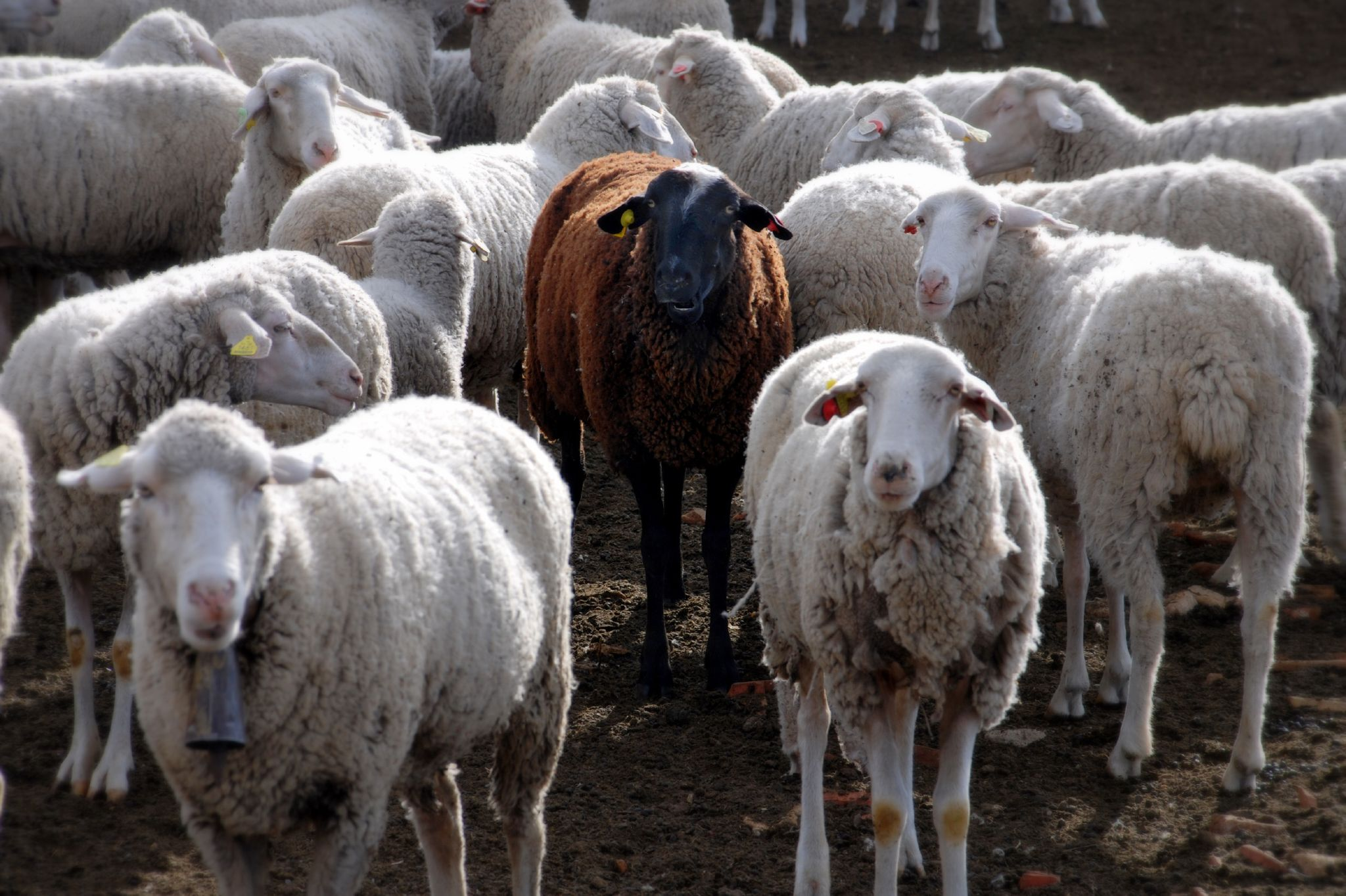
A black sheep stands out from the flock.

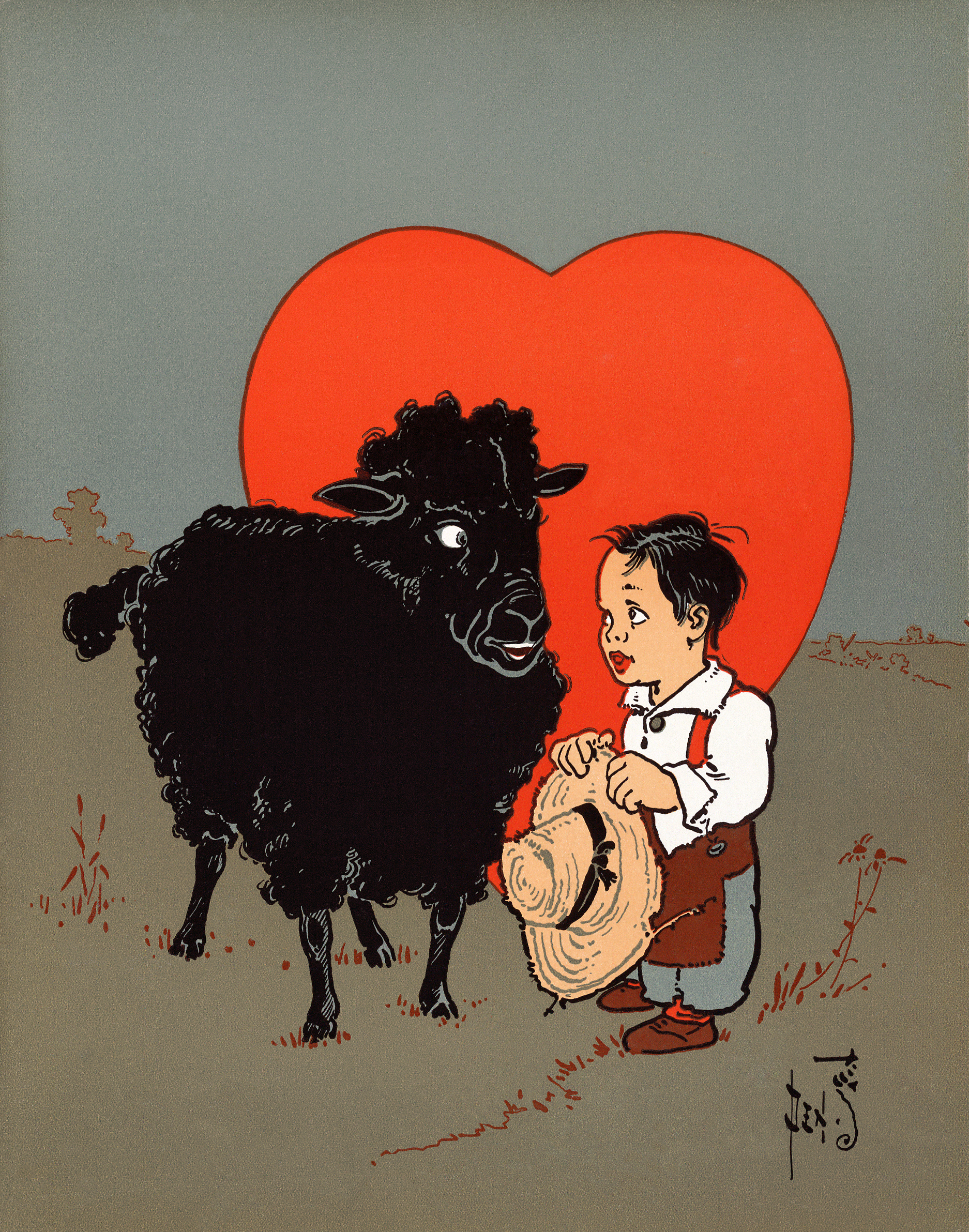
The Black Sheep from a 1901 edition of Mother Goose by William Wallace Denslow

In the English language, black sheep is an idiom that describes a member of a group who is different from the rest, especially a family member who does not fit in. The term stems from sheep whose fleece is colored black rather than the more common white; these sheep stand out in the flock, and their wool is worth less because it cannot be dyed.

The term has typically carried negative implications, implying waywardness.

In psychology, the "black sheep effect" refers to the tendency of group members to judge likeable ingroup members more positively and deviant ingroup members more negatively than comparable outgroup members.

== Origin ==
In most sheep, a white fleece is not caused by albinism but by a common dominant gene that switches color production off, thus obscuring any other color that may be present. A black fleece is caused by a recessive gene, so if a white ram and a white ewe are each heterozygous for black, about one in four of their lambs will be black. In most white sheep breeds, only a few white sheep are heterozygous for black, so black lambs are usually much rarer than this.

== Idiomatic usage ==
The term originated from the occasional black sheep which are born into a flock of white sheep. Black wool is considered commercially undesirable because it cannot be dyed. In 18th- and 19th-century England, the black color of the sheep was seen as the mark of the devil. In modern usage, the expression has lost some of its negative connotations, though the term is usually given to the member of a group who has certain characteristics or lack thereof deemed undesirable by that group. Jessica Mitford described herself as "the red sheep of the family", a communist in a family of aristocratic fascists.

The idiom is also found in other languages, e.g. German, Finnish, French, Italian, Serbo-Croatian, Bulgarian, Hebrew, Portuguese, Greek, Turkish, Hungarian, Dutch, Afrikaans, Swedish, Danish, Spanish, Catalan, Czech, Slovak, Romanian, Ukrainian and Polish. During the Second Spanish Republic, a weekly magazine named El Be Negre, meaning 'The Black Sheep', was published in Barcelona.

The same concept is illustrated in some other languages by the phrase "white crow": for example, belaya vorona (бе́лая воро́на) in Russian and kalāg-e sefīd (کلاغ سفید) in Persian.

== In psychology ==
In 1988, Marques, Yzerbyt and Leyens conducted an experiment where Belgian students rated the following groups according to trait descriptors (e.g. sociable, polite, violent, cold): unlikeable Belgian students, unlikeable North African students, likeable Belgian students, and likeable North African students. The results indicated that favorability is considered highest for likeable ingroup members and lowest for unlikeable ingroup members, with the favorability of unlikeable and likeable outgroup members lying between the two ingroup members. These extreme judgements of likeable and unlikeable (i.e., deviant) ingroup members, relative to comparable outgroup members, is called the "black sheep effect". This effect has been shown in various intergroup contexts and under a variety of conditions, and in many experiments, manipulating likeability and norm deviance.

=== Explanations ===
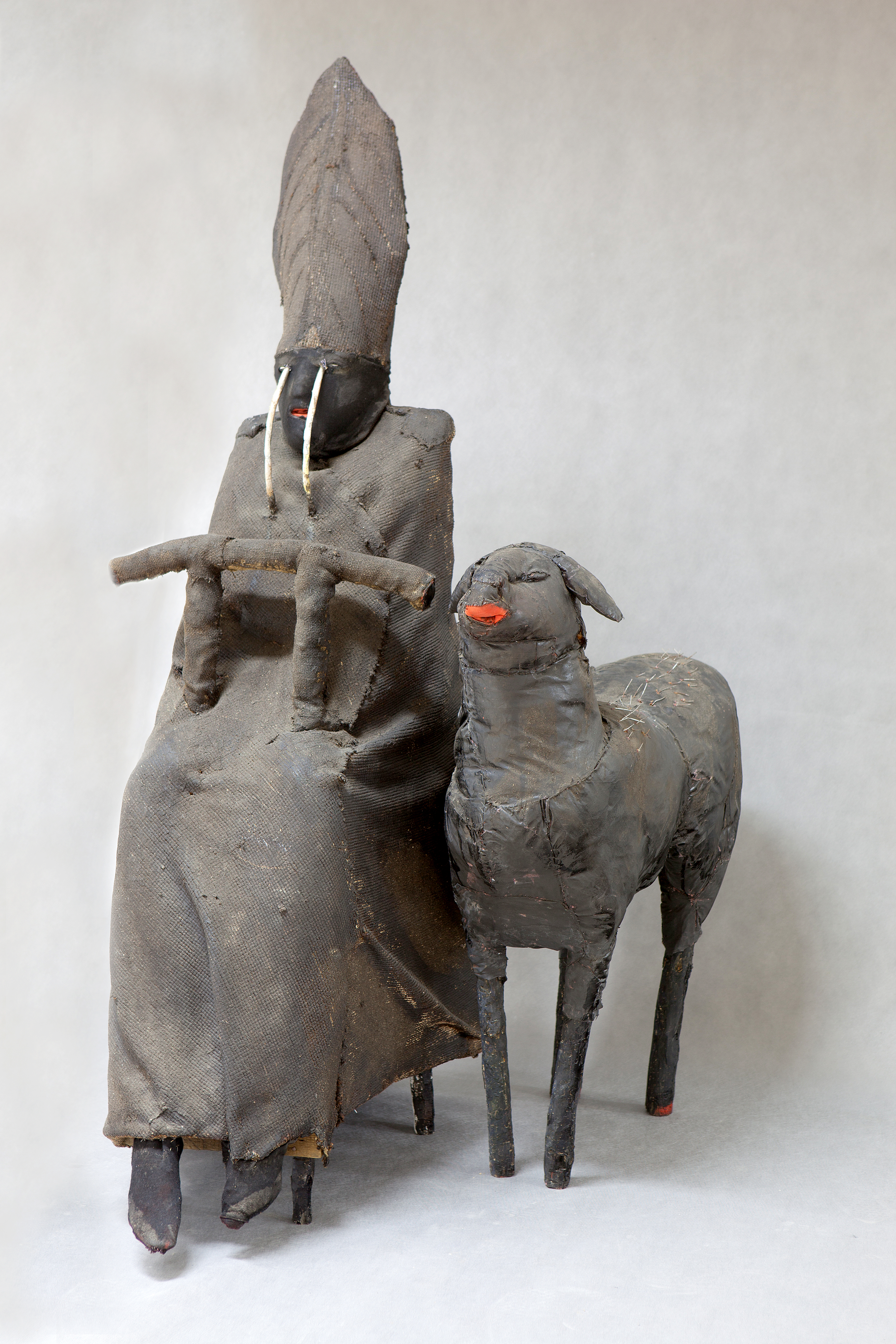
Black Pope and Black Sheep, a sculpture by Mirosław Bałka, 1987

A prominent explanation of the black sheep effect derives from the social identity approach (social identity theory and self-categorization theory). Group members are motivated to sustain a positive and distinctive social identity and, as a consequence, group members emphasize likeable members and evaluate them more positive than outgroup members, bolstering the positive image of their ingroup (ingroup bias). Furthermore, the positive social identity may be threatened by group members who deviate from a relevant group norm. To protect the positive group image, ingroup members derogate ingroup deviants more harshly than deviants of an outgroup.

Eidelman and Biernat wrote in 2003 that personal identities are also threatened through deviant ingroup members. They argue that devaluation of deviant members is an individual response of interpersonal differentiation. Khan and Lambert suggested in 1998 that cognitive processes such as assimilation and contrast, which may underline the effect, should be examined.

=== Limitations ===
Even though there is wide support for the black sheep effect, the opposite pattern has been found, for example, that White participants judge unqualified Black targets more negatively than comparable White targets. Consequently, there are several factors which influence the black sheep effect. For instance, the higher the identification with the ingroup, and the higher the entitativity of the ingroup, the more the black sheep effect emerges. Even situational factors explaining the deviance have an influence whether the black sheep effect occurs.

== See also ==
- Black swan theory
- Dark horse
- Glossary of sheep husbandry
- Scapegoat
- Baa Baa Black Sheep
- The Ugly Duckling
- Low-life
