= Max Scheler =

German philosopher (1874–1928)

- Born: Max Ferdinand Scheler; 22 August 1874; Munich, Kingdom of Bavaria, German Empire
- Died: 19 May 1928 (aged 53); Frankfurt am Main, Hesse-Nassau, Prussia, Germany

Education
- Education: Ludwig-Maximilians-Universität München; Friedrich Wilhelm University of Berlin; University of Jena
- Doctoral advisor: Rudolf Eucken
- Other advisors: Wilhelm Dilthey; Theodor Lipps; Georg Simmel; Carl Stumpf

Philosophical work
- Era: 20th-century philosophy
- Region: Western philosophy
- School: Phenomenology; Munich phenomenology Ethical personalism
- Institutions: University of Jena
- Doctoral students: Hendrik G. Stoker
- Notable students: Dietrich von Hildebrand; Helmuth Plessner
- Main interests: History of ideas, value theory, ethics, philosophical anthropology, consciousness studies, sociology of knowledge, philosophy of religion
- Notable ideas: Value-ethics, Ressentiment, ethical personalism, ordo amoris

Max Ferdinand Scheler (German: [ˈʃeːlɐ]; 22 August 1874 – 19 May 1928) was a German philosopher known for his work in phenomenology, ethics, and philosophical anthropology. Considered in his lifetime one of the most prominent German philosophers, Scheler developed the philosophical method of Edmund Husserl, the founder of phenomenology.

After Scheler's death in 1928, Martin Heidegger affirmed, with Ortega y Gasset, that all philosophers of the century were indebted to Scheler and praised him as "the strongest philosophical force in modern Germany, nay, in contemporary Europe and in contemporary philosophy as such."

== Biography ==
=== Childhood ===
Max Scheler was born in Munich, Germany, on 22 August 1874, to a well-respected Orthodox Jewish family: his Catholic father had converted to Judaism in order to marry his mother. He had "a rather typical late nineteenth century upbringing in a Jewish household bent on assimilation and agnosticism." He converted to Catholic Christianity in 1901.

=== Student years ===
Scheler began his university studies as a medical student at the Ludwig-Maximilians-Universität München; he then transferred to the Friedrich Wilhelm University of Berlin where he abandoned medicine in favor of philosophy and sociology, studying under Wilhelm Dilthey, Theodor Lipps, Carl Stumpf and Georg Simmel. He moved to the University of Jena in 1896, where he studied under Rudolf Eucken, at that time a very popular philosopher who went on to win the Nobel Prize in Literature in 1908. (Eucken corresponded with William James, a noted proponent of philosophical pragmatism, and throughout his life, Scheler entertained a strong interest in pragmatism.) It was at the University of Jena that Scheler completed his doctorate and his habilitation and began his professional life as a teacher. His doctoral thesis, completed in 1897, was entitled Beiträge zur Feststellung der Beziehungen zwischen den logischen und ethischen Prinzipien (Contribution to establishing the relationships between logical and ethical principles). In 1898, he made a trip to Heidelberg and met Max Weber, who also had a significant impact on his thought. He obtained his habilitation in 1899 with a thesis entitled Die transzendentale und die psychologische Methode (The transcendental and the psychological method) directed by Eucken. He became a lecturer (Privatdozent) at the University of Jena in 1901.

=== Philosophical contributions ===
==== Love and the "phenomenological attitude" ====
When the editors of Geisteswissenschaften invited Scheler (about 1913/14) to write on the then developing philosophical method of phenomenology, Scheler indicated that the phenomenological movement was not defined by universally accepted theses but by a "common bearing and attitude toward philosophical problems." Scheler disagrees with Husserl that phenomenology is a method of strict phenomenological reduction, but rather "an attitude of spiritual seeing … something which otherwise remains hidden …." Calling phenomenology a method fails to take seriously the phenomenological domain of original experience: the givenness of phenomenological facts (essences or values as a priori) "before they have been fixed by logic," and prior to assuming a set of criteria or symbols, as is the case in the natural and human sciences as well as other (modern) philosophies which tailor their methods to those of the sciences.

Rather, that which is given in phenomenology "is given only in the seeing and experiencing act itself." The essences are never given to an 'outside' observer without direct contact with a specific domain of experience. Phenomenology is an engagement of phenomena, while simultaneously a waiting for its self-givenness; it is not a methodical procedure of observation as if its object is stationary. Thus, the particular attitude (Geisteshaltung, lit. "disposition of the spirit" or "spiritual posture") of the philosopher is crucial for the disclosure, or seeing, of phenomenological facts. This attitude is fundamentally a moral one, where the strength of philosophical inquiry rests upon the basis of love. Scheler describes the essence of philosophical thinking as "a love-determined movement of the inmost personal self of a finite being toward participation in the essential reality of all possibles."

The movement and act of love is important for philosophy for two reasons: (1) If philosophy, as Scheler describes it, hearkening back to the Platonic tradition, is a participation in a "primal essence of all essences" (Urwesen), it follows that for this participation to be achieved one must incorporate within oneself the content or essential characteristic of the primal essence. For Scheler, such a primal essence is most characterized according to love, thus the way to achieve the most direct and intimate participation is precisely to share in the movement of love. It is important to mention, however, that this primal essence is not an objectifiable entity whose possible correlate is knowledge; thus, even if philosophy is always concerned with knowing, as Scheler would concur, nevertheless, reason itself is not the proper participative faculty by which the greatest level of knowing is achieved. Only when reason and logic have behind them the movement of love and the proper moral preconditions can one achieve philosophical knowledge. (2) Love is likewise important insofar as its essence is the condition for the possibility of the givenness of value-objects and especially the givenness of an object in terms of its highest possible value. Love is the movement which "brings about the continuous emergence of ever-higher value in the object--just as if it was streaming out from the object of its own accord, without any sort of exertion...on the part of the lover. ...true love opens our spiritual eyes to ever-higher values in the object loved." Hatred, on the other hand, is the closing off of oneself or closing one's eyes to the world of values. It is in the latter context that value-inversions or devaluations become prevalent, and are sometimes solidified as proper in societies. Furthermore, by calling love a movement, Scheler hopes to dispel the interpretation that love and hate are only reactions to felt values rather than the very ground for the possibility of value-givenness (or value-concealment). Scheler writes, "Love and hate are acts in which the value-realm accessible to the feelings of a being...is either extended or narrowed."

==== Material value-ethics ====
Values and their corresponding disvalues are ranked according to their essential interconnections as follows:

1. Religiously relevant values (holy/unholy)
2. Spiritual values (beauty/ugliness, knowledge/ignorance, right/wrong)
3. Vital values (health/unhealthiness, strength/weakness)
4. Sensible values (agreeable/disagreeable, comfort/discomfort)

Further essential interconnections apply with respect to a value's (disvalue's) existence or non-existence:

- The existence of a positive value is itself a positive value.
- The existence of a negative value (disvalue) is itself a negative value.
- The non-existence of a positive value is itself a negative value.
- The non-existence of a negative value is itself a positive value.

And with respect to values of good and evil:

- Good is the value that is attached to the realization of a positive value in the sphere of willing.
- Evil is the value that is attached to the realization of a negative value in the sphere of willing.
- Good is the value that is attached to the realization of a higher value in the sphere of willing.
- Evil is the value that is attached to the realization of a lower value [at the expense of a higher one] in the sphere of willing.

Goodness, however, is not simply "attached" to an act of willing, but originates ultimately within the disposition (Gesinnung) or "basic moral tenor" of the acting person. Accordingly:

- The criterion of 'good' consists in the agreement of a value intended, in the realization, with the value preferred, or in its disagreement with the value rejected.
- The criterion of 'evil' consists in the disagreement of a value intended, in the realization, with the value preferred, or in its agreement with the value rejected.

==== Man and History (1924) ====
n 1924, Man and History (Mensch und Geschichte), Scheler gave some preliminary statements on the range and goal of philosophical anthropology.

In this book, Scheler argues for a tabula rasa of all the inherited prejudices from the three main traditions that have formulated an idea of man: religion, philosophy and science. Scheler argues that it is not enough just to reject such traditions, as did Nietzsche with the Judeo-Christian religion by saying that "God is dead"; these traditions have impregnated all parts of our culture, and therefore still determine a great deal of the way of thinking even of those that don't believe in the Christian God.

=== Death ===
Scheler planned to publish his major work in anthropology in 1929, but on 19 May 1928 he died in a Frankfurt hospital due to complications from a severe heart attack. Some fragments of the incomplete work have been published in Nachlass.

== Legacy ==
After Scheler's death in 1928, Martin Heidegger affirmed, with Ortega y Gasset, that all philosophers of the century were indebted to Scheler and praised him as "the strongest philosophical force in modern Germany, nay, in contemporary Europe and in contemporary philosophy as such."

== Personal life ==
Scheler's first marriage, to Amalie von Dewitz, ended in divorce. Scheler married Märit Furtwängler in 1912, who was the sister of the noted conductor Wilhelm Furtwängler.

Scheler's son by his first wife, Wolf Scheler, became troublesome after the divorce, often stealing from his father, and in 1923, after Wolf had tried to force him to pay for a prostitute, Scheler sent him to his former student Kurt Schneider, a psychiatrist, for diagnosis. Schneider diagnosed Wolf as not being mentally ill, but a psychopath, using two diagnostic categories (Gemütlos and Haltlos) essentially equivalent to today's "antisocial personality disorder".

=== Religion ===
An adult convert to Catholicism, after 1921 Scheler disassociated from Catholic teaching and even from the Judeo-Christian-Islamic God, committing himself to pantheism and philosophical anthropology.

=== Health ===
Scheler had developed the habit of smoking between sixty and eighty cigarettes a day which contributed to a series of heart attacks throughout 1928, forcing him to cancel any travel plans.

== Works ==
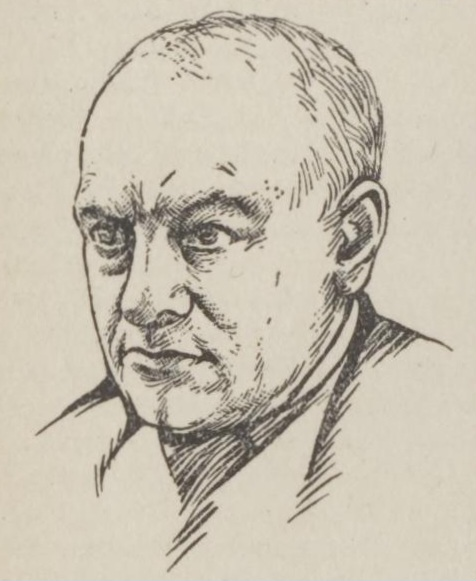
Max Scheler

- Zur Phänomenologie und Theorie der Sympathiegefühle und von Liebe und Hass, 1913
- Der Genius des Kriegs und der Deutsche Krieg, 1915
- Der Formalismus in der Ethik und die materiale Wertethik, 1913–1916
- Krieg und Aufbau, 1916
- Die Ursachen des Deutschenhasses, 1917
- Vom Umsturz der Werte, 1919
- Neuer Versuch der Grundlegung eines ethischen Personalismus, 1921
- Vom Ewigen im Menschen, 1921
- Probleme der Religion. Zur religiösen Erneuerung, 1921
- Wesen und Formen der Sympathie, 1923 (newly edited as: Zur Phänomenologie ... 1913)
- Schriften zur Soziologie und Weltanschauungslehre, 3 Bände, 1923/1924
- Die Wissensformen und die Gesellschaft, 1926
- Der Mensch im Zeitalter des Ausgleichs, 1927
- Die Stellung des Menschen im Kosmos, 1928
- Philosophische Weltanschauung, 1929
- Logik I. (Fragment, Korrekturbögen). Amsterdam 1975

=== English translations ===
- The Nature of Sympathy, New Haven: Yale University Press, 1954.
- Philosophical Perspectives. translated by Oscar Haac. Boston: Beacon Press. 1958. 144 pages. (German title: Philosophische Weltanschauung.)
- On the Eternal in Man. translated by Bernard Noble. London: SCM Press. 1960. 480 pages.
- Ressentiment. edited by Lewis A. Coser, translated by William W. Holdheim. New York: Schocken. 1972. 201 pages. ISBN 0-8052-0370-2.
- Selected Philosophical Essays. translated by David R. Lachterman. Evanston, Illinois: Northwestern University Press. 1973. ISBN 9780810103795. 359 pages. ISBN 0-8101-0379-6.
- Formalism in Ethics and Non-Formal Ethics of Values: A New Attempt toward the Foundation of an Ethical Personalism. Translated by Manfred S. Frings and Roger L. Funk. Evanston, Illinois: Northwestern University Press. 1973. 620 pages. ISBN 0-8101-0415-6. (Original German edition: Der Formalismus in der Ethik und die materiale Wertethik, 1913–16.)
- Problems of a Sociology of Knowledge. translated by Manfred S. Frings. London: Routledge & Kegan Paul. 1980. 239 pages. ISBN 0-7100-0302-1.
- Person and Self-value: Three Essays. edited and partially translated by Manfred S. Frings. Boston: Nijhoff. 1987. 201 pages. ISBN 90-247-3380-4.
- On Feeling, Knowing, and Valuing. Selected Writings. edited and partially translated by Harold J. Bershady. Chicago: University of Chicago Press. 1992. 267 pages. ISBN 0-226-73671-7.
- The Human Place in the Cosmos. translated by Manfred Frings. Evanston: Northwestern University Press. 2009. 79 pages. ISBN 978-0-8101-2529-2.

== See also ==
- Mimpathy

== Sources ==
- Barber, Michael (1993). Guardian of Dialogue: Max Scheler's Phenomenology, Sociology of Knowledge, and Philosophy of Love. Lewisburg: Bucknell University Press. 205 pages. ISBN 0-8387-5228-4.
- Blosser, Philip (1995). Scheler's Critique of Kant's Ethics. Athens, Ohio: Ohio University Press. ISBN 9780821411087. 221 pages. ISBN 0-8214-1108-X.
- Deeken, Alfons (1974). Process and Permanence in Ethics: Max Scheler's Moral Philosophy. New York: Paulist Press. 282 pages. ISBN 0-8091-1800-9.
- Frings, Manfred S. (1965). Max Scheler: A concise introduction to the world of a great thinker. Pittsburgh, Pennsylvania: Duquesne University Press. 223 pages.
- Frings, Manfred S. (1969). Person und Dasein: Zur Frage der Ontologie des Wertseins. Den Haag: Martinus Nijhoff. 118 pages.
- Frings, Manfred S., ed. (1974). Max Scheler (1874-1928): centennial essays. The Hague: Nijhoff. 176 pages.
- Frings, Manfred (1997). The Mind of Max Scheler: The first comprehensive guide based on the complete works. Milwaukee, Wisconsin: Marquette University Press. 324 pages. ISBN 0-87462-613-7. 2nd ed., 2001.
- Frings, Manfred (2003). Life-Time. Springer. 260 pages. ISBN 1-4020-1333-7. 2nd ed., 2001.
- Kelly, Eugene (1977). Max Scheler. Chicago: Twayne Publishers. ISBN 9780805777079. 203 pages. ISBN 0-8057-7707-5.
- Kelly, Eugene (1997). Structure and Diversity: Studies in the Phenomenological Philosophy of Max Scheler. Boston: Kluwer. 247 pages. ISBN 0-7923-4492-8.
- Nota, John H., S.J. (1983). Max Scheler: The Man and His Work. translated by Theodore Plantinga and John H. Nota. Chicago: Franciscan Herald Press. 213 pages. ISBN 0-8199-0852-5. (Original Dutch title: Max Scheler: De man en zijn werk)
- Ranly, Ernest W. (1966). Scheler's Phenomenology of Community. The Hague: Martinus Nijhoff. 130 pages.
- Schneck, Stephen F. (1987). Person and Polis: Max Scheler's Personalism and Political Theory. Albany: State University of New York Press. 188 pages. ISBN 0-88706-340-3.
- Spader, Peter (2002). Scheler's Ethical Personalism: Its logic, Development, and Promise. New York: Fordham University Press. 327 pages. ISBN 0-8232-2178-4.
