= Ordo amoris =

Concept in Catholic theology

Ordo amoris (Latin for "order of love") is a concept in Catholic theology concerned with the proper ordering of Christian love. It is sometimes conflated with the related ordo caritatis (Latin for "order of charity".)

Deriving from the Augustinian works The City of God and On Christian Doctrine, and expanded upon by Thomas Aquinas in Summa Theologica, the concept has been interpreted as establishing an interconnected hierarchy in terms of which "special regard" is to be paid to those persons who, "by the accidents of time, or place, or circumstance, are brought into closer connection" with the Christian individual. In modern philosophy, ordo amoris has primarily been associated with the German philosopher Max Scheler and his work on emotional life.

== Historical background ==
=== Philosophical ladder of love ===
The concept of ordo amoris was preceded by the Platonic idea of the "ladder of love" or "ascent of love" described in Plato's Symposium, particularly through the character Diotima:

- Ascent in love: Diotima describes love as a journey from physical beauty to the appreciation of beauty in all forms, eventually leading to the love of beauty itself (the Form of Beauty). This ascent is a progression from lower to higher forms of love, mirroring the prioritization in Scheler's ordo amoris.
- Philosophical and spiritual growth: Both concepts suggest that love should lead to personal transformation, deepening one's understanding of value and reality.
- Educational and ethical implications: In both philosophies, the journey or ordering of love is not only personal but has implications for how one should live ethically, educating one's emotions and affections towards what is truly valuable.

=== Theological order of love ===
The idea of an ordo amoris has its origins in Christian thought, in which it was often linked to the teachings of St Augustine of Hippo, who wrote of the proper ordering of loves as key to a moral life: "a brief and true definition of virtue is 'rightly ordered love'." Virtus est ordo amoris We order our love by practicing the four cardinal virtues: temperance, fortitude, justice, and prudence "which flow out to our neighbors who are all image bearers and themselves the objects of the love of God." Augustine's philosophy emphasized that love should be directed primarily towards God, followed by love for other humans and then for material things, according to their value in relation to the divine.

Love is, for Thomas Aquinas, "a benevolential actuality of wishing some good to some person" similar to Greek agape. However the ordo amoris does not necessarily imply a competition between rival loves:

[...]If any man loves not his neighbor, neither does he love God, not because his neighbor is more lovable, but because he is the first thing to demand our love: and God is more lovable by reason of His greater goodness.

— Aquinas, The Order of Charity, Summa theologiae

==== The order of charity ====
For Aquinas, charity is "essentially a sort of friendship, which consists of a mutual rational love founded on some 'communication of eternal happiness'" similar to Greek philia: distinguished from amoris because "a friend loves (amoris) the possessions and other things of his friend, but he does not have friendship with these things."

Thomas Aquinas wrote:

[T]here must needs be some order in things loved out of charity, which order is in reference to the first principle of that love, which is God.

— Aquinas, The Order of Charity, Summa theologiae

Applying this to practical issues of the order of charity, opportunity gives responsibility:

Now one man's connection with another may be measured in reference to the various matters in which men are engaged together; (thus the intercourse of kinsmen is in natural matters, that of fellow-citizens is in civic matters, that of the faithful is in spiritual matters, and so forth): and various benefits should be conferred in various ways according to these various connections, we ought in preference to bestow on each one such benefits as pertain to the matter in which [...] he is most closely connected with us. And yet this may vary according to the various requirements of time, place, or matter in hand: because in certain cases one ought, for instance, to succor a stranger, in extreme necessity, rather than one's own father, if he is not in such urgent need.

— Aquinas, Beneficence, Summa theologiae

For Aquinas, the degree of connection must be prudentially balanced against the degree of need:

The case may occur, however, that one ought rather to invite strangers (to eat), on account of their greater want. For it must be understood that, other things being equal, one ought to succor those rather who are most closely connected with us. And if of two, one be more closely connected, and the other in greater want, it is not possible to decide, by any general rule, which of them we ought to help rather than the other, since there are various degrees of want as well as of connection: and the matter requires the judgment of a prudent man.

— Aquinas, Beneficence, Summa theologiae

=== Ethical theory of value ===
In his work Formalism in Ethics and Non-Formal Ethics of Values (1913–1916), Scheler expanded on the ordo amoris concept by integrating it into his theory of value. Scheler posits that:

- Values are intrinsic: They exist independently of human recognition and are ordered according to their nature.
- Love as a cognitive act: Love, for Scheler, is not just an emotion but a way of knowing; it discerns values and ranks them in an ordo amoris.
- Hierarchy of values: Scheler describes four levels of values – the sensible (pleasure and pain), vital (health, vigor), spiritual (beauty, truth, justice), and the holy (sacred, divine). The correct ordo amoris involves loving higher values more than lower ones.

Scheler's ordo amoris is dynamic, suggesting that personal development involves an ongoing refinement of this love-order, where one learns to appreciate higher values more fully.

== Applications ==
=== Psychology and ethics ===
Contemporary thinkers in psychology and ethics might interpret "ordo amoris" in terms of how individuals should prioritise their affections to achieve psychological health or ethical integrity. Thus, the French philosopher Albert Camus was influenced in his first philosophical work on the absurd by Scheler’s book on sympathy, and especially his notion of ordo amoris. Albert Camus relied on the ethics of sympathy developed by Scheler to provide the theoretical framework within which he rethinks Nietzsche’s ethical and political project of overcoming nihilism.

=== Religious thought ===
In theology, the concept continues to be relevant in discussions about the proper orientation of love towards God, others, and the self, often reflected in pastoral teachings or spiritual guidance.

=== Cultural theory ===
The idea of ordo amoris can also be applied to critique modern culture's valuation systems, examining how societies might misorder their loves towards materialism or superficiality over deeper values.

== Criticism and debate ==
=== Refuting self-love as an ordered love ===
The notion of ordo amoris in theology was first challenged in the 16th century. Since the Protestant Reformation, figures such as Martin Luther have rejected the notion of self-love and thereby refuted the structure of the ordo amoris. Matt Jenson writes that:

Luther's complete rejection of self-love represents a radicalizing and even at points a rejection of Augustine's ordo amoris.

=== Rejecting a prescriptive hierarchy ===
Critics might argue that Scheler's rigid value hierarchy can be overly prescriptive or fail to account for individual or cultural differences in value perception. Moreover, debates occur around the practical application of such a hierarchy in everyday life where values often compete rather than align neatly.

=== 2025 theological controversy ===
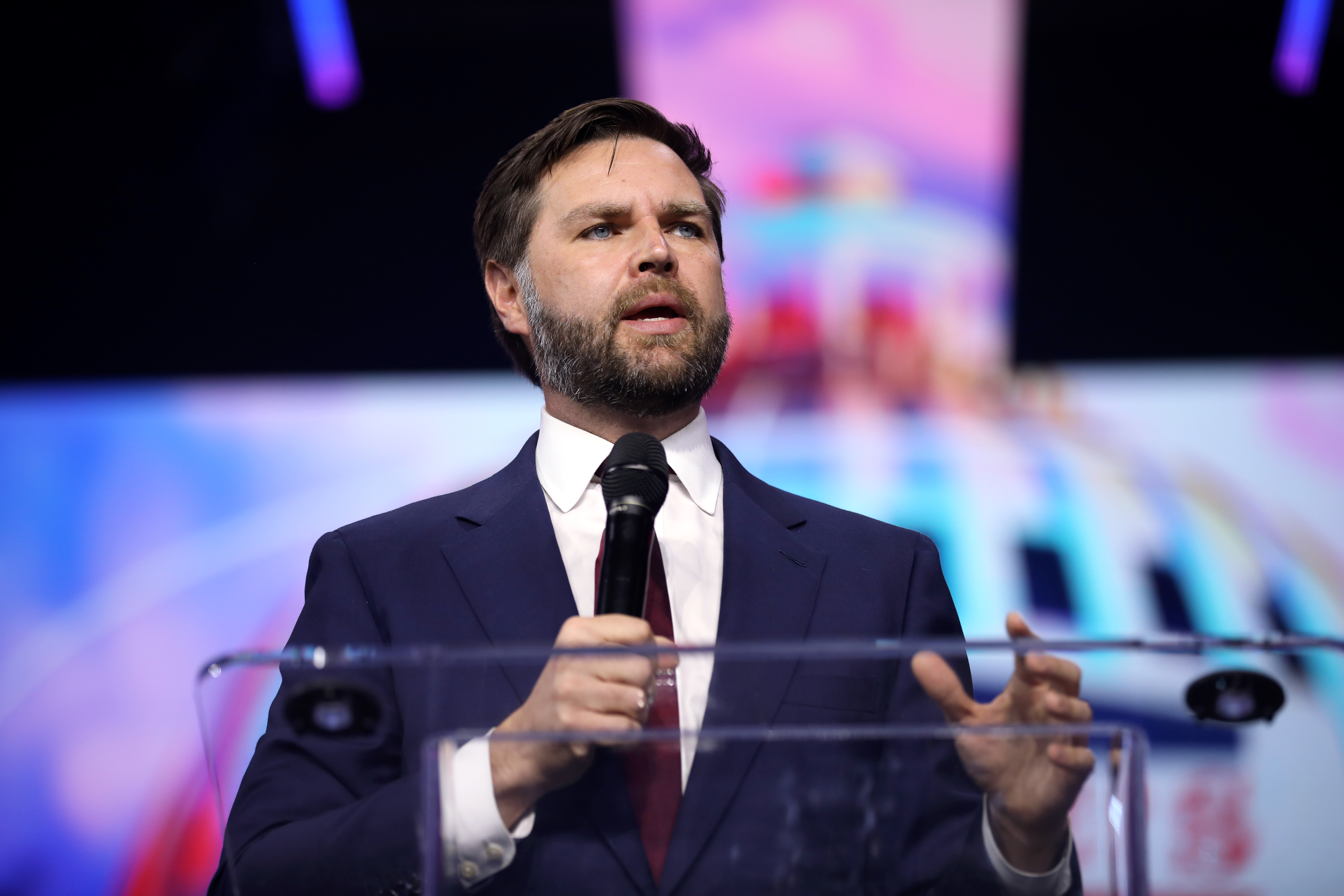
JD Vance's invocation of ordo amoris to defend the foreign aid policies of the second Trump administration gave rise to debate as to the proper interpretation and application of the concept.

Vice President of the United States JD Vance, on 30 January 2025, referenced the concept of ordo amoris in an interview with Sean Hannity in defending the foreign aid policies of the second Trump administration, saying "We should love our family first, then our neighbors, then love our community, then our country, and only then consider the interests of the rest of the world."

Vance's remarks drew praise and criticism. The controversy precipitated the publication of a letter from Pope Francis to the bishops of the United States of America, in which the Pope stated that:

The true ordo amoris that must be promoted is that which we discover by meditating constantly on the parable of the "Good Samaritan" (cf. Lk 10:25–37), that is, by meditating on the love that builds a fraternity open to all, without exception.

== See also ==
- Max Scheler
- Augustine of Hippo
- Plato's Symposium
- Ethics
- Value theory
- Moral circle expansion

== Sources ==
- Scheler, Max. Formalism in Ethics and Non-Formal Ethics of Values.
- Augustine of Hippo. Confessions and The City of God.
- Plato. Symposium.
