= Black sheep effect =

Psychological phenomenon

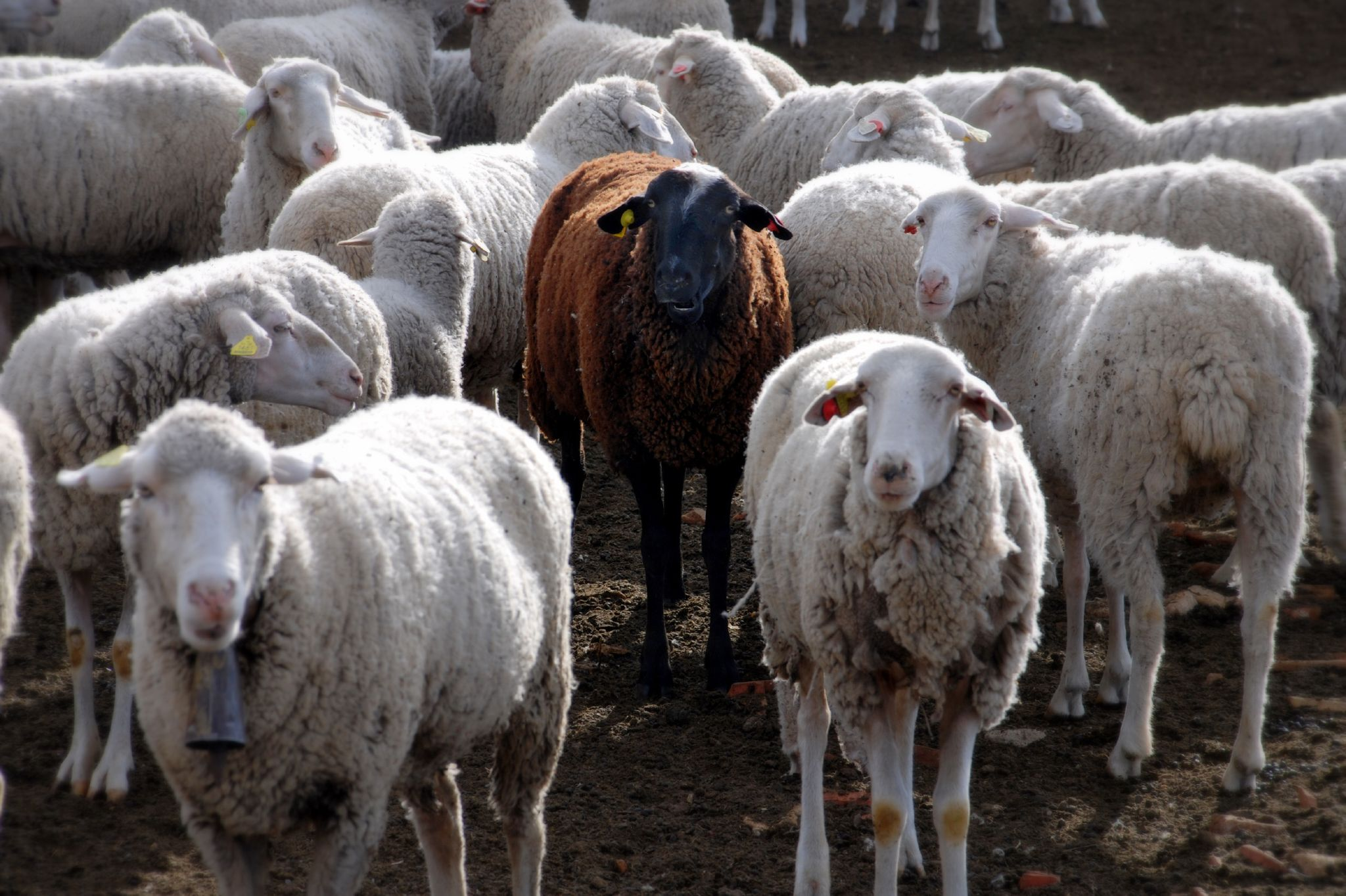
A black sheep standing out from the rest of its flock

The black sheep effect (BSE) is a psychological phenomenon in which members of a social group judge deviant ingroup members more harshly than members that are aligned with an outgroup (Marques et al., 1988). The BSE was first identified by Marques, Yzerbyt, and Leyens in 1988. They found this effect shows how groups maintain their identity and keep their group cohesion by distancing themselves from members that violate group norms or values (Marques et al., 1988). BSE manifests differently depending on factors such as type of deviance, strength of identity, or group member status (Marques et al., 1988).

== Theoretical background ==
The black sheep effect is rooted in social identity theory and group dynamics, which are integral for understanding BSE. Social Identity Theory was developed by Henri Tajfel and John Turner in 1979, in which they propose individuals derive a part of their sense of self from their memberships in groups (Tajfel & Turner, 1979). With this, they try to maintain their group’s positive social image and identity by comparing themselves to outgroups (Tajfel & Turner, 1979). Deviant ingroup members, those who violate the shared norms or values, can potentially tarnish the group’s positive image if they are not living up to their standards (Tajfel & Turner, 1979). This tends to cause these members to be viewed in a more negative light than similar members of outgroups (Tajfel & Turner, 1979). It is a phenomenon that severely discourages the violation of norms while reinforcing group boundaries (Tajfel & Turner, 1979).

Another topic related to BSE is the Subjective Group Dynamics Theory (SGDT), which focuses on the response of groups to deviance (Marques & Abrams, 1998). This theory belies that groups actively punish and marginalise members who violate the groups norms (Marques & Yzerbyt, 1988). According to SGDT, groups sanction deviant members, which is exactly what happens in BSE (Marques & Yzerbyt, 1998). To summarise, SGDT offers a strong explanation for the Black Sheep Effect; by harshly penalising deviant ingroup members, groups symbolically reinforce their norms, which maintains a positive identity for the group (Marques & Yzerbyt, 1988). SGDT has been criticised for overexaggerating disciplinary responses since it ignores groups who reintegrate deviant members rather than exclude them (Jetten & Hornsey, 2014).

== Empirical findings ==
=== Original study ===
The Black Sheep Effect was first identified by Marques, Yzerbyt, Leyens in a 1988 study. Participant were asked to self-report the trustworthiness of individuals who were described as either members of their own group or an outgroup, and their deviance or their lack thereof (Marques et al., 1988). The results showed that participants rated negatively behaving ingroup members more harshly than the negatively behaving outgroup members, which illustrated the Black Sheep Effect (Marques et al., 1988). Furthermore, positively behaving ingroup members were viewed as more favourable than positive outgroup members, which establishes ingroup favouritism (Marques et al., 1988).

=== Replications and expansion ===
Since Marques et al.’s (1988) initial study, the Black Sheep Effect has been replicated across a variety of cultural, developmental, and social contexts. These replications support Marques et al.’s (1988) effect and reinforce its significance.

==== Cross cultural evidence ====
Several studies have shown that the Black Sheep Effect occurs across different settings (Marques, J. et al., 1998). Marques, Abrams, Páez, and Martínez-Taboada (1998) argued that BSE is relevant in both Spain and the United Kingdom. Participants from both cultures judged deviant ingroup members worse than equivalent outgroup members. However, Spanish participants, who come from a collectivist culture, expressed more negative evaluations (Marques, J. et al., 1998). Their research suggests that collectivist societies, where they place more emphasis on intergroup harmony, might be more sensitive to deviance within a group compared to non-collectivist cultures, such as the United Kingdom (Stamkou et al., 2018).

==== Developmental evidence ====
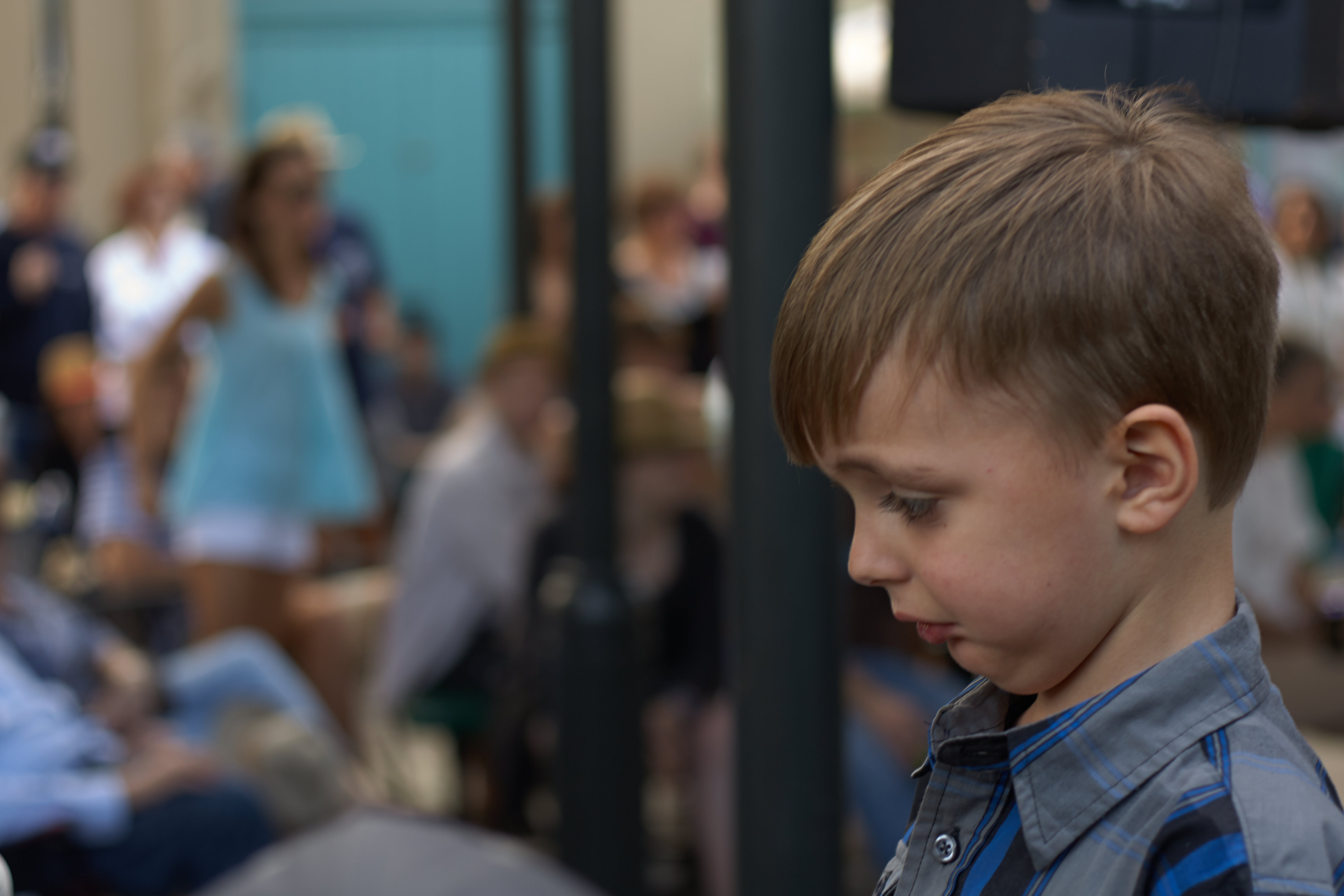
Boy being excluded from group

The Black Sheep Effect has been observed in younger populations by Abrams et al. (2003), who conducted a study with children aged five to six. They found that even at this early developmental stage, children viewed misbehaving group members more negatively than similarly acting outgroup members (Abrams et al., 2003). Their findings indicate that the cognitive and social mechanisms of the BSE emerge in early childhood, alongside the development of group-based reasoning and the sense of social identity (Abrams et al., 2003).

== Levels of deviance ==
Research on the Black Sheep Effect has found that the intensity of the effect changes depending on the type of deviance committed by a group member (Leach et al., 2007). The effect can occur from a wide range of norm violations; however, its strength is based on whether the violation concerns morality, competence, or broader societal norms (Pinto et al., 2010).

=== Moral violations ===
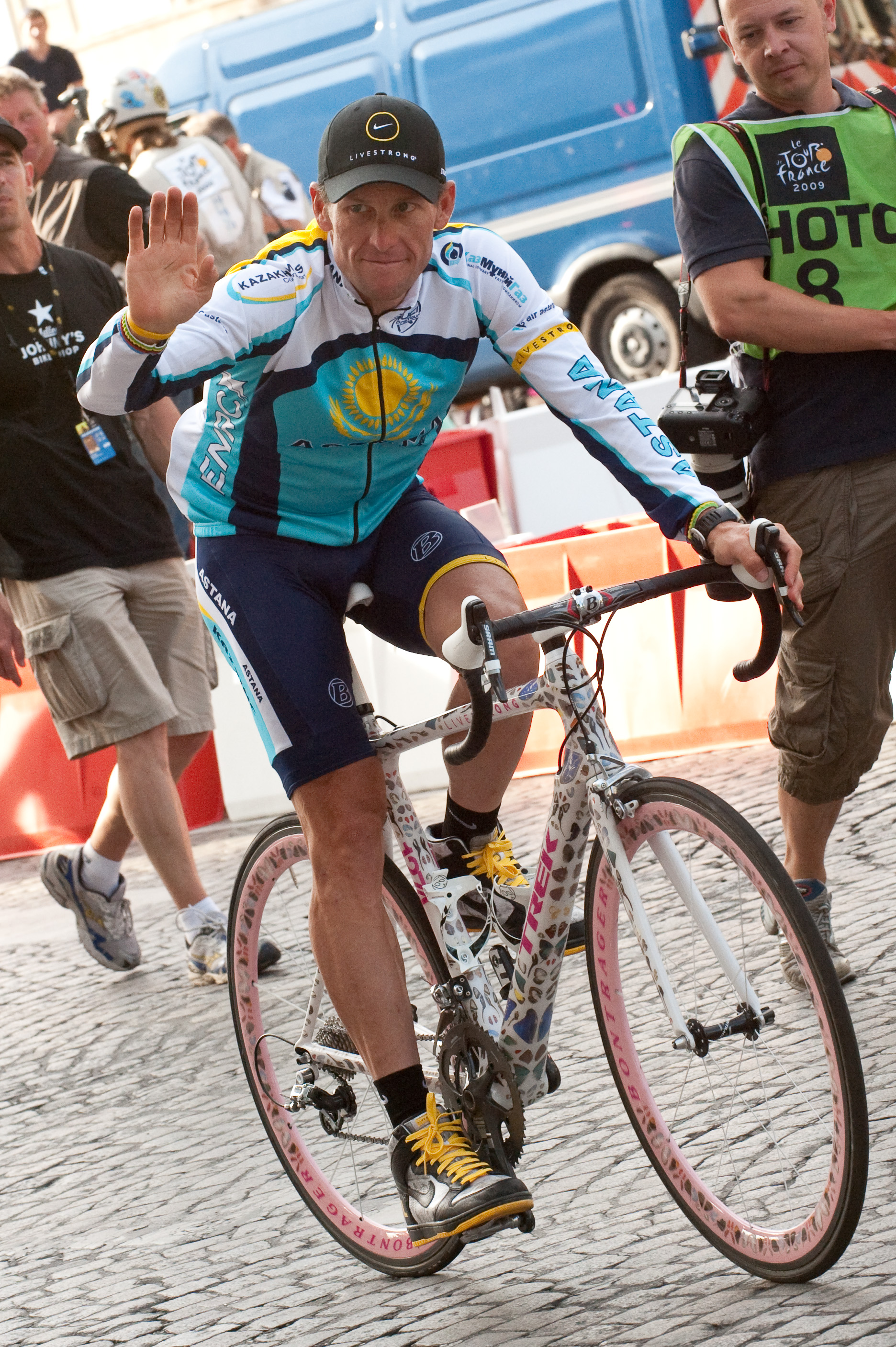
Lance Armstrong before doping scandal

Moral violations consistently form the strongest Black Sheep Effect response (Leach et al., 2007). Moral values often create the core of a group’s identity. Any violations of ethical (Marques & Pinto, 2023). Harsher sanctions of the deviant group member are used to symbolically distance the group from the offender, which will reaffirm their moral standing (Pinto et al., 2010). Pinto, Marques, and Levine (2010) did a study involving academic dishonesty, in which participants rated dishonest ingroup members, their fellow students, as less trustworthy and more deserving of punishment from equally dishonest outgroup members. A real-world example of moral violations is when cyclist Lance Armstrong admitted to using performance-enhancing drugs, which caused a backlash from his teammates and supporters (Bell et al., 2016). The intense criticism from his sporting community reflected the desire to protect the integrity of the cycling industry (Bell et al., 2016). This illustrates the BSE because Armstrong committed a violation that goes against the norms of cycling and sports, which caused him to be cast out by his community.

=== Competence failures ===
Competence-rated deviance refers to circumstances in which an ingroup member is seen as underperforming (Hornsey & Jetten, 2004). While lack of competence may not challenge the group, it can harm the group’s reputation for effectiveness (Hornsey & Jetten, 2004). Lack of competence evokes a moderate effect of the BSE, since it undermines the group’s success and reputation (Pinto et al., 2010). Hornsey and Jetten (2004) showed that in highly competitive settings, incompetence within the group prompted stronger reactions, since members feared being associated with failure. A real-world example is in 2017, when Uber’s board of directors forced their CEO Travis Kalanick to publicly resign after his leadership ability consciously failed (Isaac, 2017). Despite the fact many companies faced similar operational issues, Kalanick’s incompetence and inability to manage a workplace made him the “black sheep” of Uber (Isaac, 2017).

=== Social norm breaches ===
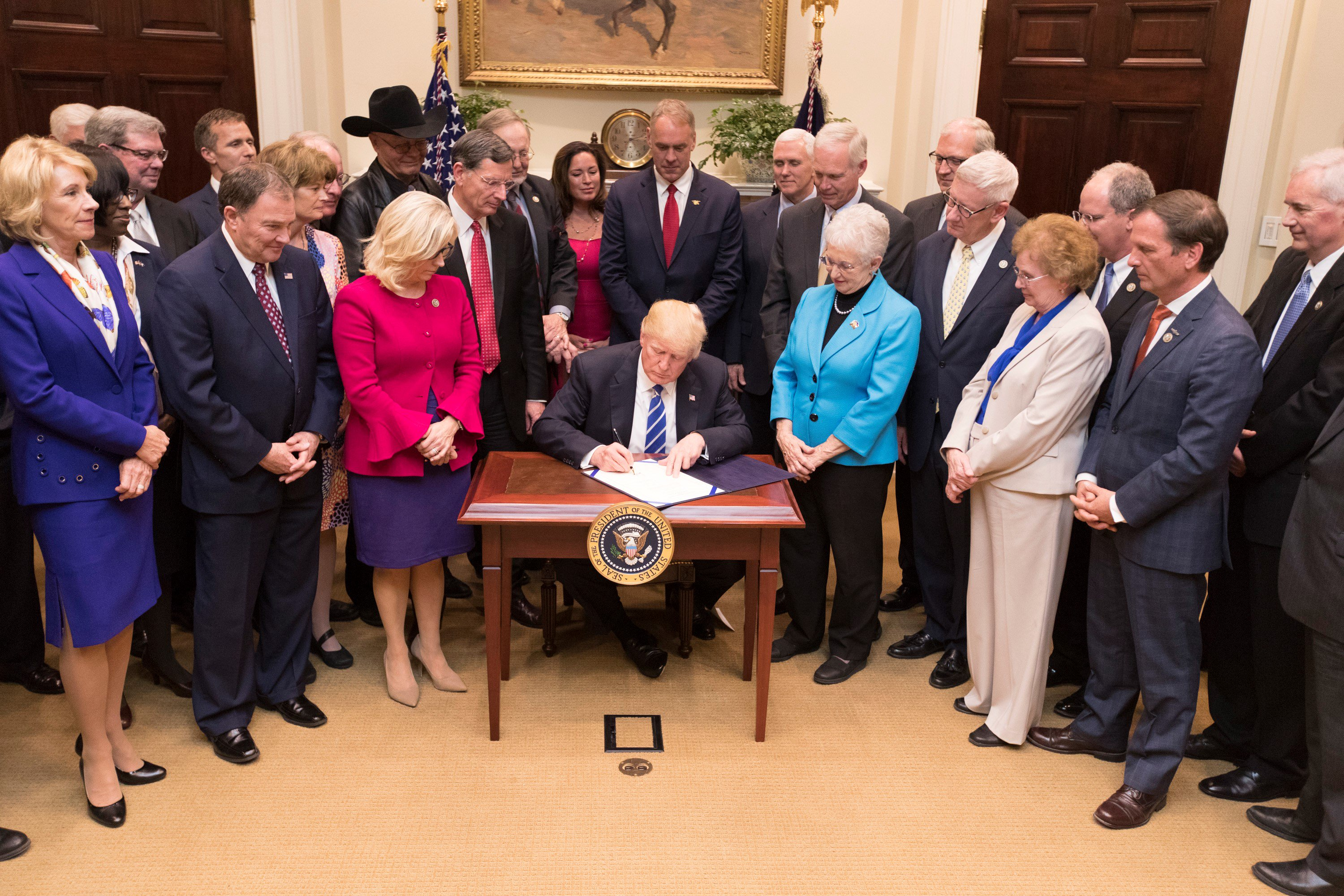
Liz Cheney and fellow Republicans watch President Donald Trump sign bill

The BSE can also occur in response to group norms that are not technically moral or based on competences (Jetten & Hornsey, 2014). These breaches may involve differences in political alignment, behaviour, or appearance that set an ingroup member apart from the rest (Jetten & Hornsey, 2014). The severity of the punishment depends on the norm’s importance within the group identity (Pinto et al., 2010). Jetten, Hornsey, Spears, and Cowell (2010) did a study where political party members rated a politically different party member as less likeable and trustworthy than a non-group member with similar views. A real-world example is in 2021, Liz Cheney, a Republican congresswoman, voted to impeach President Donald Trump (Edmondson & Fandos, 2021). Her fellow Republicans condemned her and stripped her of her role (Edmondson & Fandos, 2021). This illustrates the Black Sheep Theory, as Cheney’s actions violated the core norm of the party’s loyalty and were judged more harshly than Democrats who voted for Trump’s impeachment (Edmondson & Fandos, 2021).

== Cause of Black Sheep Effect ==
=== Strength of group identification ===
The effect is usually stronger among individuals who strongly identify with their group (Marques & Paez, 1994). People who highly identify have a greater motivation to protect their group’s image compared to those whose connection to the group’s identity is less (Marques & Paez, 1994). “Group identification intensifies the need to maintain a positive social identity, making high identifiers particularly vigilant in sanctioning deviant ingroup members to preserve group cohesion” (Hornsey & Hogg, 2000). The high identifiers are therefore more likely to punish the deviant ingroup members (Marques & Paez, 1994).

=== Nature of the deviance ===
Deviance that violates values or core moral group elicits harsher judgement than the violation of less central group norms (Hornsey & Hogg, 2000). For example, a group member committing a criminal act may be judged more harshly than one who dresses strangely.

=== Group member status ===
“Deviance by high-status ingroup members represents a greater threat to group identity because such members embody the group’s values and are expected to set normative standards” (Marques et al., 2001). The punishment of “core” members serves to realign the group’s morals and signal the boundaries of acceptable behaviour (Hornsey & Jetten, 2004). Looking back on Lance Armstrong as an example, he was the top cyclist in the world, which is why his downfall was so much greater compared to lesser-known cyclists who used similar drugs (Bell et al., 2016).

== Critical analysis ==
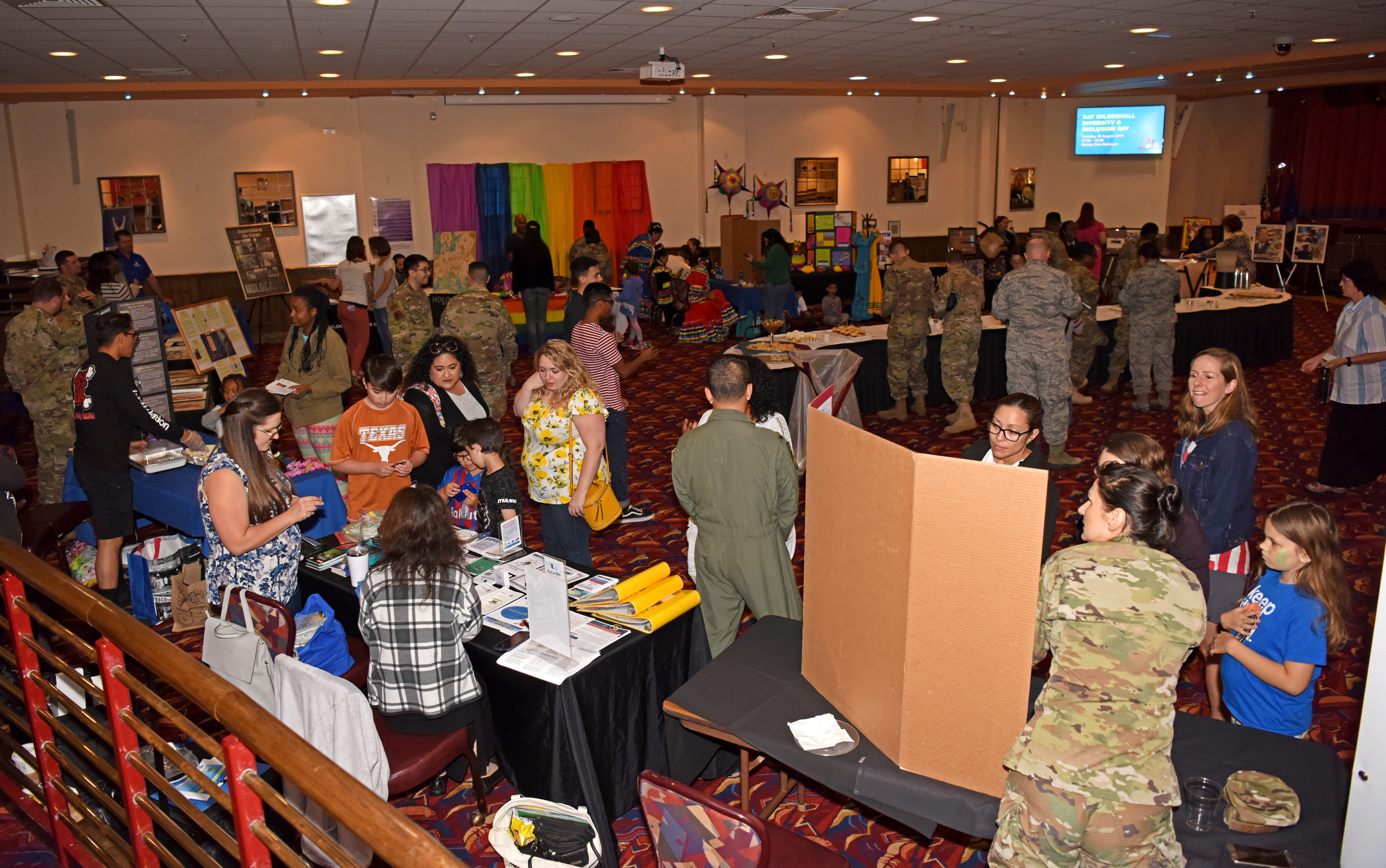
Room full of diverse individuals

The Black Sheep Effect is wildly supported; however, researchers have found several strengths and limitations in the current literature. Many of the studies focus on controlled experimental designs, which allow for significant causal conclusions to be made They also have facilitated replications of the original study across several different age groups, cultures, and group types (Marques et al., 1998). In addition, the use of diverse measures, such as self-report questionnaires, behavioural observations, and judgement tasks, can strengthen the reliability of the study’s findings (Marques et al., 2001). On the other hand, many studies looking into the Black Sheep Effect have relied heavily on university students for their sample, who are frequently drawn from Western, educated, industrialised, rich, and democratic (WEIRD) societies (Henrich et al., 2010). This brings into question the generalisability of the findings to other cultures or populations, especially in non-Western groups and marginalised peoples (Henrich et al., 2010). Furthermore, most of the research was conducted within a laboratory setting, which may cause oversimplification of real-world group dynamics and how they react to deviance (Haslam et al., 2020). This means there will be a lack of ecological reliability (Haslam et al., 2020).

== Interpretation ==
The Black Sheep functions as a mechanism to protect their group’s integrity and enforce their morals, which is consistent with Social Identity Theory and Subjective Group Dynamics Theory (Tajfel & Turner, 1979). However, how it’s presented varies based on cultural context, the type of deviance, and the individual group identification. In modern online communities, public visibility and rapid communication often amplifies the BSE by enabling swifter and more widespread sanctioning (Jetten & Hornsey, 2014). However, it is unclear whether harsh punishments lead to exclusion or whether it leads to group reparation (Jetten & Hornsey, 2014).

== Conclusion ==
The Black Sheep Effect is a robust and well-documented social psychological phenomenon, illustrating how groups can maintain unity and protect their identity (Marques & Paez, 1994). Research has consistently shown that ingroup members who violate the group’s collective norms or values are judged harsher than similar outgroup members, especially if the deviance is seen as threatening to the group’s moral fabric or public image (Pinto et al., 2010). The effect has been seen across cultures, age groups, and social settings, thus supporting the BSE as a core process of ingroup control (Marques et al., 1998).

Simultaneously, the literature highlights several complexities and gaps in the research. The strength of the BSE depends on the type of deviance, the significance of the violated norm, and the level of identification of the groups (Pinto et al., 2010). Methodologically, most of the research relies on laboratory experiments and samples consisting of students, which limits generalisability research and ecological validity (Henrich et al., 2010). Further research would benefit from longitudinal and field studies that help track BSE processes in real-world groups and cultures over time. On top of this, bringing attention to marginalised groups and digital contexts is needed, especially since online platforms cause the enforcement of norms to be more visible and oftentimes, more severe (Henrich et al., 2010). Overall, the Black Sheep Effect explains the balance between solidarity within groups and norm enforcement. By understanding the conditions of why groups reject their “black sheep” scholars can gain deeper knowledge into the wider processes of social cohesion, exclusion, and identity protection.
