= Mimpathy =

Philosophical concept related to empathy and sympathy

Mimpathy (German: Nachfühlen, literally "after experience") is a philosophical concept related to empathy and sympathy. In Dagobert D. Runes' 1942 Dictionary of Philosophy, contributor Herman Hausheer defines mimpathy as the sharing of another's feelings on a matter, without necessarily experiencing feelings of sympathy.

Philosopher Max Scheler describes mimpathy, or "emotional imitation", as the basis for sympathy, but of no help in understanding another person in and of itself. Scheler identifies four types of sympathy:

1. Compathy, or emotional solidarity, the immediate sharing of the same emotion with another
2. Genuine sympathy, in which sorrow is experienced "in an act of understanding experienced as such an act", and the objective source of emotion is not shared
3. Transpathy, or emotional contagion, a state induced in a group, "automatic and without understanding", by the emotional display of another
4. Unipathy, or genuine emotional identification with another, an "intensified" and "involuntary" form of transpathy, which may present as a folie à deux.

Academic Karen E. Smythe, in analyzing the fiction of Mavis Gallant, described mimpathy as a combination of mimesis and empathy, an acting out of "self-dramas" as a means of interpreting the suffering of literary characters.

== See also ==
- Consolation
