= Steven Stosny =

American psychologist

Steven Stosny is the founder of Compassion Power in suburban Washington, DC, and the author of several books on improving relationships. He has taught at the University of Maryland, and St. Mary's College of Maryland. Stosny argues that marriage counseling, psychotherapy, anger management, and abuser treatment often makes relationships worse because among other things, the therapists make women feel ashamed of their natural feelings of guilt; requiring a great many weekly one-hour sessions; and because in their efforts to build working alliances with reluctant male clients, counselors reinforce that the husband has been mostly right and the wife mostly wrong. Stosny argues, "Abuser groups fail because they focus on negative attitudes, rather than the core hurts that cause them."

== Stosny model ==
Stosny is the creator of the Stosny model of behavioral intervention programs for intimate partner abusers. Its focus is on nurturing compassion, in contrast to the Duluth model, whose focus is on getting offenders to embrace feminist principles. Stosny's program seeks to use tools such as the Stosny-created 20-minute video "Shadows of the Heart". Stosny's research shows that self-esteem enhancement during treatment for partner violent men is correlated with violence reduction, and does not increase the risk for subsequent relationship aggression.

== Bibliography ==
Stosny is the author and coauthor of several books, as well as a blog in psychology today. His books have been translated into Spanish, Italian, and German.

- Soar Above: How to Use the Most Profound Part of Your Brain Under Any Kind of Stress
- Empowered Love: Use Your Brain to Be Your Best Self and Create Your Ideal Relationship
- Love Without Hurt: Turn Your Resentful, Angry, or Emotionally Abusive Relationship into a Compassionate, Loving One (this book has also been released under the title You Don't Have To Take It Anymore, with the same subtitle.
- Living and Loving after Betrayal: How to Heal from Emotional Abuse, Deceit, Infidelity, and Chronic Resentment
- The Powerful Self: A Workbook of Therapeutic Self-Empowerment
- Treating Attachment Abuse: A Compassionate Approach
- The Laws of Emotion and Meaning
- How to Improve Your Marriage Without Talking About It (with coauthor Patricia Love)
- Why Women Talk and Men Walk (with coauthor Patricia Love)
- A Man Who Thinks He Knows Who Really Killed the President: A Novel
