= Manfred Frings =

German academic (1925–2008)

Manfred S. Frings (27 February 1925 – 15 December 2008) was a scholar of philosophy, a professor, and the editor of the German editions of Heidegger Gesamtausgabe and Max Scheler's works. He was known as the world's leading specialist in the philosophy of Max Scheler, he published over one hundred articles, and edited twenty-four books. He wrote The Mind of Max Scheler: The First Comprehensive Guide Based on the Complete Works, as well as the foreword to Pope John Paul II's book, Primat des Geistes.

== Biography ==
Frings was born on February 27, 1925, in Cologne-Lindenthal, Germany. He attended a Catholic school, and lived near a Jewish community. His home and school were destroyed in the bombing of Cologne in World War II. Later in the war, Frings was drafted into the German Army. He was captured by American forces and held at a prisoner-of-war camp near Rouen, France. After the war, Frings studied philosophy, English, and French at the University of Cologne; he received his doctorate in philosophy in 1953. In 1958, Frings immigrated to the United States to teach philosophy at the University of Detroit. In 1962, Frings accepted a position teaching at Duquesne University. Frings began teaching at DePaul University in 1966, and remained with DePaul until his retirement in 1992.

In 1966, Frings established the first International Heidegger Conference at DePaul. He was one of the six scholars chosen by Martin Heidegger to be the editors of Heidegger's Collected Works, or Gesamtausgabe. From 1970 until 1997, Frings was editor of Max Scheler's Collected Works. He was president, then president emeritus of the international Max Scheler Society (Max-Scheler-Gesellschaft), and he was a founder of the Max Scheler Society of North America. Frings was the American correspondent for The British Society for Phenomenology from 1975 until 1996. Frings was also the director of the Max-Scheler-Archives in Munich and Albuquerque.

According to Christina M. Bleyer, during his career, Frings focused primarily on "Scheler's phenomenology of values, sociology of knowledge, ethics, political theory, and philosophy of time." He also studied the historical links between pre-Socratic thought and basic concepts of contemporary atomic physics. Frings' publications have been translated into Chinese, Japanese, and French. Frings died after a stroke on December 15, 2008.

== Bibliography ==
Frings works, according to the Max Scheler Society of North America:

- Max Scheler: A Concise Introduction into the World of a Great Thinker (Pittsburgh, 1965; 2nd ed, Milwaukee, 1996).
- Person und Dasein: Zur Frage der Ontologie des Wertseins (The Hague, 1969).
- "Max Scheler: Rarely Seen Complexities of Phenomenology," Phenomenology in Perspective, ed. F. J. Smith (The Hague, 1970).
- Zur Phänomenologie der Lebensgemeinschaft: Ein Versuch mit Max Scheler (Meisenheim, 1971).
- Philosophy of Prediction and Capitalism (Dordrecht, 1987). "Scheler, Max," Encyclopédie Philosophique Universelle, III, Les Ouvres Philosophiques (Paris, 1992).
- "The Background of Max Scheler's 1927 Reading of Being and Time: A Critique of a Critique Through Ethics," Philosophy Today 36 (1992): 99–113.
- "Max Scheler," Encyclopedia Americana (Danbury, Connecticut, 1994).
- "Max Scheler," Encyclopedia Britannica, 15th ed (1994).
- "Max Scheler," Dictionaire d'éthique et de philosophie morale (Paris, 1996).
- "Max Scheler," The Encyclopedia of Phenomenology (Dordrecht, 1997).
- The Mind of Max Scheler: The First Comprehensive Guide Based on the Complete Works (Milwaukee, 1997).
