= 1908 in philosophy =

List of years in philosophy
- … 1898; 1899; 1900; 1901; 1902; 1903; 1904; 1905; 1906; 1907; 1908; 1909; 1910; 1911; 1912; 1913; 1914; 1915; 1916; 1917; 1918 …
- Art; Archaeology; Architecture; Literature; Music; Philosophy; Science; +...

1908 in philosophy

== Events ==
- Kurt Grelling and Leonard Nelson propose the Grelling–Nelson paradox.

== Births ==
- March 14 – Maurice Merleau-Ponty, French phenomenological philosopher (died 1961)
- June 25 – Willard Van Orman Quine, American analytical philosopher (died 2000)
- November 28 – Claude Lévi-Strauss, Belgian-born French anthropologist (died 2009)
