= 1913 in philosophy =

List of years in philosophy
- … 1903; 1904; 1905; 1906; 1907; 1908; 1909; 1910; 1911; 1912; 1913; 1914; 1915; 1916; 1917; 1918; 1919; 1920; 1921; 1922; 1923 …
- Art; Archaeology; Architecture; Literature; Music; Philosophy; Science; +...

1913 in philosophy

== Events ==
- Rabindranath Tagore was awarded the Nobel Prize in Literature.
- Foundation stone of First Goetheanum in Dornach, Switzerland, was laid as a centre for the Anthroposophical Society by Rudolf Steiner (September 20).

== Publications ==
- Edmund Husserl, Ideas: General Introduction to Pure Phenomenology (1913)
- Walther Rathenau, Zur Mechanik des Geistes (1913)
- Rosa Luxemburg, The Accumulation of Capital (1913)
- Max Scheler, Formalism in Ethics and Non-Formal Ethics of Values (1913-16, originally published in German as Der Formalismus in der Ethik und die materiale Wertethik)
- Niels Bohr, "On the Constitution of Atoms and Molecules" (1913)
- Ludwig Wittgenstein, review of Peter Coffey's The Science of Logic (1913)

== Births ==
- February 27 - Paul Ricœur (died 2005)
- March 3 - Roger Caillois (died 1978)
- September 25 - Norman O. Brown (died 2002)
- September 26 - Lewis White Beck (died 1997)
- November 7 - Albert Camus (died 1960)

== Deaths ==
- February 22 - Ferdinand de Saussure (born 1857)
- November 7 - Alfred Russel Wallace (born 1823)
