= 1921 in philosophy =

List of years in philosophy
- … 1911; 1912; 1913; 1914; 1915; 1916; 1917; 1918; 1919; 1920; 1921; 1922; 1923; 1924; 1925; 1926; 1927; 1928; 1929; 1930; 1931 …
- Art; Archaeology; Architecture; Literature; Music; Philosophy; Science; +...

1921 in philosophy

== Publications ==
- Theodor Lessing, Die verfluchte Kultur (published in German, 1921)
- Albert Einstein, The Meaning of Relativity (1921)
- Nicolai Hartmann, Grundzüge einer Metaphysik der Erkenntnis (published in German, 1921)
- Franz Rosenzweig, The Star of Redemption (1921)
- Ludwig Wittgenstein, Tractatus Logico-Philosophicus (First published in German in 1921 as Logisch-Philosophische Abhandlung; translated by C. K. Ogden with assistance from G. E. Moore, F. P. Ramsey, and Wittgenstein himself. G. E. Moore suggested the Latin title to pay homage to Tractatus Theologico-Politicus by Benedictus Spinoza. This book allegedly aimed to complete logical atomism as espoused by Bertrand Russell and G. E. Moore.)
- Liang Shuming, The Civilization and Philosophy of the East and the West (1921)

== Births ==
- February 4 - Betty Friedan (died 2006)
- February 8 - Hans Albert (died 2023)
- February 21 - John Rawls (died 2002)
- May 12 - Joseph Beuys (died 1986)
- July 25 - Paul Watzlawick (died 2007)
- August 31 - Raymond Williams (died 1988)
- September 12 - Stanisław Lem (died 2006)
- September 19 - Paulo Freire (died 1997)

== Deaths ==
- February 8 - Peter Kropotkin (born 1842)
