= 1926 in philosophy =

List of years in philosophy
- … 1916; 1917; 1918; 1919; 1920; 1921; 1922; 1923; 1924; 1925; 1926; 1927; 1928; 1929; 1930; 1931; 1932; 1933; 1934; 1935; 1936 …
- Art; Archaeology; Architecture; Literature; Music; Philosophy; Science; +...

1926 in philosophy

== Publications ==
- Jan Smuts, Holism and Evolution (1926) [Note: The term holism was coined by the author.]
- Nicolai Hartmann, Ethik (1926)
- Will Durant, The Story of Philosophy (1926)
- Sarvepalli Radhakrishnan, The Hindu View of Life (1926)

== Births ==
- January 3 - Robert Misrahi (died 2023)
- January 4 - Marcus George Singer (died 2016)
- January 14 - Peter Winch, British philosopher of social science (died 1997)
- January 17 - Shizuteru Ueda, Japanese philosopher of religion (died 2019)
- February 1 - Leonardo Polo (died 2013)
- April 6 - Edward Grant (died 2020)
- April 9 - John E. Thomas (died 1996)
- April 29 - Renford Bambrough (died 1999)
- June 6 - José María Valverde (died 1996)
- June 25 - Ingeborg Bachmann (died 1973)
- June 26 - Karel Kosík (died 2003)
- July 8 - David Malet Armstrong (died 2014)
- July 31 - Hilary Putnam (died 2016)
- August 2 - Herbert McCabe (died 2001)
- August 7 - Arthur Chute McGill, Canadian-born American theologian and philosopher (died 1980)
- August 12 (probable) - Jamal Khwaja, Indian philosopher (died 2020)
- August 18 - Herbert Thomas Mandl (died 2007)
- August 21 - Erwin Marquit (died 2015)
- September 1 - Stanley Cavell (died 2018)
- September 23 - Hugo Adam Bedau (died 2012)
- September 24 - Louis H. Mackey (died 2004)
- October 15 - Michel Foucault (died 1984)
- October 29 - Joel Feinberg (died 2004)
- September 4 - George Dickie (died 2020)
- September 4 - Ivan Illich (died 2002)
- October 9 - Hans Skjervheim (died 1999)
- December 13 - Truman G. Madsen (died 2009)
- December 25 - Eugene Gendlin, Austrian-born American philosopher (died 2017)
- date unknown
  - Abdoldjavad Falaturi, German scholar of Iranian origin (died 1996)
  - William Alvin Howard
  - Kai Nielsen, Canadian philosopher (died 2021)
  - Hartley Rogers, Jr., mathematician working in recursion theory (died 2015)

== Deaths ==
- March 7 - Carl Nicolai Starcke (born 1858)
- April 17 - Anna Willess Williams (born 1852)
- June 21 - Paul Souriau (born 1852)
- September 15 - Rudolf Christoph Eucken (born 1846)
- December 23 - Swami Shraddhanand (born 1856)
