= 1925 in philosophy =

| List of years in philosophy |
- … 1915; 1916; 1917; 1918; 1919; 1920; 1921; 1922; 1923; 1924; 1925; 1926; 1927; 1928; 1929; 1930; 1931; 1932; 1933; 1934; 1935 …
- Art; Archaeology; Architecture; Literature; Music; Philosophy; Science; +...

1925 in philosophy

== Events ==
- Royal Institute of Philosophy was founded in 1925.

== Publications ==
- Alfred North Whitehead, Science and the Modern World (1925)
- G. E. Moore, "A Defence of Common Sense" (1925)
- Marcel Mauss, The Gift (1925)

== Births ==
- January 18 - Gilles Deleuze (died 1995)
- January 20 - Ernesto Cardenal (died 2020)
- May 17 - Michel de Certeau (died 1986)
- May 19 - Malcolm X (died 1965)
- June 16 - Jean d'Ormesson (died 2017)
- June 27 - Michael Dummett (died 2011)
- July 20 - Frantz Fanon (died 1961)
- October 13 - Lenny Bruce (died 1966)
- November 19 - Zygmunt Bauman (died 2017)
- December 4 - Albert Bandura (died 2021)
- December 9 - Ernest Gellner (died 1995)

== Deaths ==
- March 30 - Rudolf Steiner (born 1861)
- July 26 - Gottlob Frege (born 1848)
