= 1901 in philosophy =

List of years in philosophy
- … 1891; 1892; 1893; 1894; 1895; 1896; 1897; 1898; 1899; 1900; 1901; 1902; 1903; 1904; 1905; 1906; 1907; 1908; 1909; 1910; 1911 …
- Art; Archaeology; Architecture; Literature; Music; Philosophy; Science; +...

1901 in philosophy

== Events ==
- Sully Prudhomme was awarded the 1901 Nobel Prize in Literature "in special recognition of his poetic composition, which gives evidence of lofty idealism, artistic perfection and a rare combination of the qualities of both heart and intellect".

== Publications ==
- Émile Boutmy, Essai d'une psychologie politique du peuple anglais au XIXe siècle
- Rudolf Christoph Eucken, Der Wahrheitsgehalt der Religion
- H. G. Wells, Anticipations of the Reaction of Mechanical and Scientific Progress Upon Human Life and Thought

== Births ==
- January 3 - Eric Voegelin (died 1985)
- April 13 - Jacques Lacan (died 1981)
- May 23 - Charles W. Morris (died 1979)
- June 16 - Henri Lefebvre (died 1991)
- November 3 - André Malraux (died 1976)
- December 5 - Werner Heisenberg (died 1976)
