= Paul Barth =

Paul Barth may refer to:

- Paul Barth (sociologist) (1858–1922), German philosopher and sociological writer
- Paul C. Barth (1858–1907), Mayor of Louisville, Kentucky
- Paul Barth (fencer) (1921–1974), Swiss fencer
- Paul Barth, Vice President of the National Guitar Corporation
- Paul Barth (judoka) (1945–2026), German judoka
