= Luis Recasens =

Spanish politician

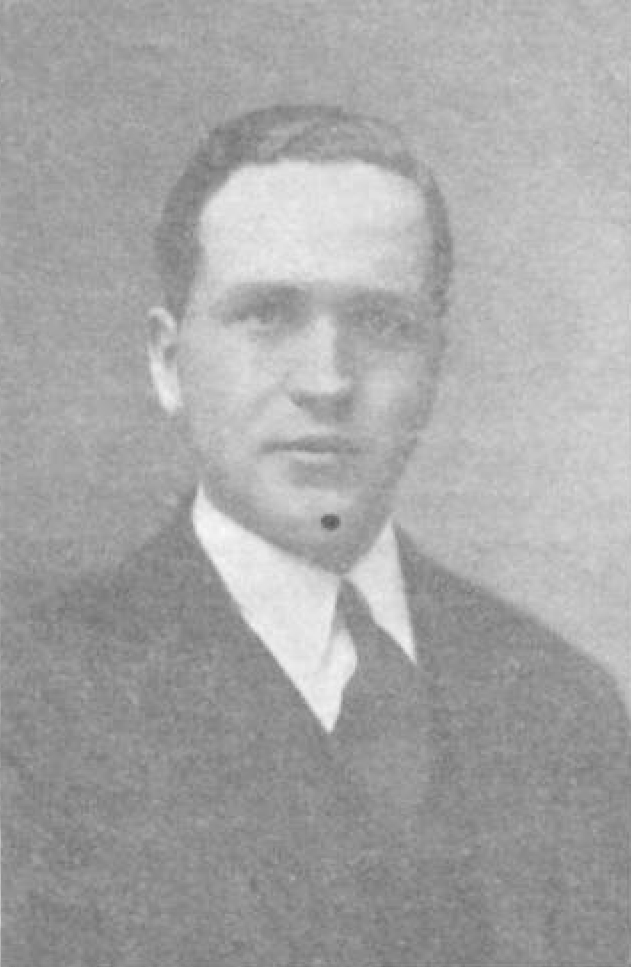
Luis Recasens

Luis Pedro Alejandro Recasens Siches (1903 in Guatemala City – 1977) was a Spanish politician and a legal philosopher.

A professor at the universities of Santiago, Salamanca, Valladolid, and Madrid, he held major positions in the Spanish government in the 1930s. After the victory of Franco in the Spanish Civil War, he went into exile in Mexico, where he was a professor at the National Autonomous University of Mexico and at El Colegio de México.

== Early life and education ==
Luis Pedro Alejandro Recaséns Siches was born in Guatemala City on June 19, 1903, the son of Pedro Recaséns Girol and Concepción Siches Gils, both originally from Spain. After two years he was taken to Spain, where from 1908 to 1912 he attended the Primary School of Barcelona. He then studied at the General and Technical Institute of Barcelona, from which he received a baccalaureate in July 1918, and at the University of Barcelona, which in 1924 awarded him both a law degree and a Bachelor of Arts and Philosophy degree. In 1924-25 he studied for a doctoral degree at the Faculty of Law at the Central University of Madrid, and wrote a dissertation about the influence of Catholic thought on legal philosophy, with special reference to the work of Francisco Suárez. From June to August 1925, on a scholarship from the Spanish government, he studied the philosophy of law at the University of Rome under the direction of Professor Giorgio del Vecchio. From November 1925 to November 1926, also on a Spanish government scholarship, he studied the philosophy of law and related subjects at the University of Berlin under Rudolf Stammler, Rudolf Smend, Heinrich Maier, and Romano Guardini. From November 1926 to April 1927 he continued his scholarship-funded studies in law, philosophy, and sociology at the University of Vienna, under the direction of professors Hans Kelsen, Fritz Schreier, Felix Kaufmann and R. Reininger.

== Philosophy of law ==
In his philosophy of law, he was a disciple of Jose Ortega y Gasset. He described the role of the judiciary as creative, in that it applies the abstractions of law, as formulated by the legislative branch, to specific situations involving “the living and authentic man, with his strengths and weaknesses, with his joys and his sufferings, with his good and his evil.” Recaséns Siches agreed with Francesco Carnelutti that for this reason “the judge is more important than the legislator.” In his view it was “fundamental to make an adequate integration between the theory of values and the sphere of human existence so that they do not have the character of abstract principles.” For him, the fundamental rights of the individual are founded in the idea of human dignity.

For him, law, like tools and scientific theories and musical compositions, is a part of “objectified human life,” a product of culture in which the dimensions of value, norm, and fact are indissolubly linked. He argued that judges must always interpret laws in a reasonable way, so as to result in the “fairer individualization of the general norm.” He criticized the juridical theory and practice of the nineteenth century for its focus on traditional logic, which he considered invalid for the treatment of “practical problems of human behavior.” Traditional mathematical logic, he argued, did not constitute the totality of the logos, which aside from embracing logic also embraced the logos of human affairs, i.e. the logic of reasonableness. In this regard, his legal thinking was largely consistent with that of Oliver Wendell Holmes, Benjamin Cardozo, John Dewey, and others.

He was also preoccupied with the issue of unjust law under totalitarian systems. He denied categorically that the law under such systems could be considered legitimate. Proper law, he wrote, treats human beings “as subjects intrinsically endowed with dignity” and “with autonomy or freedom.” Hence, laws that are not founded on such a view of humanity are not “legal norms but control techniques similar to those used for dressage or animal training. If they do not recognize the dignity of people, they are not legal norms and therefore they are unfair.“

== Academic career in Spain ==
On December 20, 1927, he was named a tenured professor in the Philosophy of Law at the University of Santiago. In 1930, after the official acceptance of his dissertation, he was appointed a full Professor in the Philosophy of Law at the University of Salamanca, but he held this position only briefly before taking up a full professorship at the University of Valladolid, where he stayed from June 1930 to April 1931.

From April to October 1931 he served as General Director of Local Administration of the Spanish Republic. He was First Vice-President of the Superior Council for the Protection of Children, appointed by the Ministry of the Interior on August 10, 1931. On October 15, 1931, he was appointed President of the Court of Appeal of the Juvenile Courts.

In April 1932 he was appointed Professor of the Philosophy of Law at the Law School of the Central University of Madrid. He began working at the university on May 10, 1932, and remained there, directing a seminar on the Philosophy of Law, for several years. until February 4, 1939. In 1933 and 1934 he presented lectures at the International Summer University of Santander, and he also he gave a number of lectures at the Academy of Jurisprudence in Madrid, at the Ateneo de Madrid. In October 1935, he participated in the Second International Congress of Philosophy of Law and Legal Sociology, held in Paris and organized by the Institut International de Philosophie du Droit et de Sociologie Juridique. He left Spain during the Spanish Civil War but retained his title at the University of Madrid until 1939.

== Political activities in Spain ==
He was elected to serve as a deputy in the Spanish legislature from 1931 to 1933, representing the Lugo district and with the support of the Liberal Republican Right and the Republican Galician Federation. He was re-elected to serve in the legislature from 1933 to 1935. He was permitted to continue teaching at the university while serving as a deputy.

He served as an attorney in Madrid, from April 1932 to July 1936.

On February 21, 1936 he was appointed undersecretary of the Ministry of Industry and Commerce. His resignation was accepted on September 9 of that year.

== France ==
Moving to France in October 1936, he served as attorney and consultant to the Consulate General of the Spanish Republic in Paris. While in Paris, he worked with the Institut de Droit Comparé, the Faculty of Law of Paris, the Institut de Sociologie of the Faculty of Letters of Paris, and the Institut International of Philosophie du Droit et Sociologie Juridique.

From Paris, on May 18, 1937, he wrote to Spain’s Ministry of Public Instruction to report that he had received an invitation to teach at the National University of Mexico. In the letter he declared his “absolute loyalty and devotion to the Republic” and his opposition to Franco. Two months later, the Ministry of Public Instruction replied with a letter permitting him to accept the offer. Recaséns had already traveled to Mexico arriving in Nuevo Laredo on June 28, 1937.

== Mexico ==
At the National University of Mexico, he taught at the National School of Jurisprudence, the Faculty of Philosophy and Letters, and the National School of Economics. At the National School of Jurisprudence he served as professor of Philosophy of Law beginning on July 1, 1937, and taught General Theory of the State and Sociology. At the Faculty of Philosophy and Letters, he taught Philosophy of Law and Sociology, and at the National School of Economics he taught Sociology. In 1939 he became a corresponding member of the Mexican Academy of Legislation and Jurisprudence.

He also worked at the Hispano Mexicano Ruiz de Alarcón Institute, in which he taught an Introduction to Philosophy course in 1940. On December 10, 1945, he was appointed Career Professor at the highest level in the Faculty of Law at the National Autonomous University of Mexico. In 1946 he was appointed director of the Seminar on Philosophy of Law at the National School of Jurisprudence of the UNAM and technical director of the Journal of the National School of Jurisprudence. On December 8, 1954 he was appointed Full Time Researcher, first category, at the Institute of Philosophical Research of the National Autonomous University of Mexico.

== United States ==
In 1948 he moved to the United States, where he served as High Official of the Secretariat of the United Nations in the divisions of Human Rights and Social Welfare from February 1949 to December 1954. He also served as an expert in legal philosophy and participating in the formulation of the Universal Declaration of Human Rights.

During the years 1949 to 1954, he taught at the Graduate Faculty of the New School for Social Research, New York; in 1953 and 1954 he taught in the Graduate Division of the New York City School of Law; in 1953, he was a visiting professor of Comparative Philosophy of Law at the Comparative Law Institute of the Tulane Law School at the University of New Orleans.

== Mexico and other international sojourns ==
Recaséns became a naturalized Mexican citizen on September 8, 1955.

From October to November 1964 he made a study trip to the Federal Republic of Germany, invited by his government. Over the years he also taught courses and delivered lectures at a number of universities in Mexico, as well as in pre-Castro Cuba, Guatemala, El Salvador, and Honduras. He was an honorary professor of the National University of El Salvador (1947), at the University of Santiago de Chile (1956), and at the University of San Marcos of Lima (1957). He was also a visiting professor in Puerto Rico in 1953 and in Texas in 1962 and 1969, and a guest lecturer at universities in Nicaragua, Costa Rica, Panama, Argentina, Uruguay, Venezuela, Peru, Brazil, West Germany, France, and Italy. Beginning in 1964, he also held visiting professorships at various institutions in Spain: the University of Madrid, 1964; the Institute of Social and Cooperative Studies of Madrid, 1965–70; the University of Barcelona, 1965–67; the universities of Valencia and Seville, 1965; the universities of Santiago, Bilbao, and La Laguna, 1966; the University of Valladolid, 1967; the University of Navarra, 1969; and the universities of Granada and Segovia, 1970.

In 1960 he headed the Seminar on Sociological Readings at the National School of Political and Social Sciences; was named Academician of the American Society for Legal and Political Philosophy; and appointed to the Academy of Scientific Research of Mexico. In 1964 he was named co-editor of the Berlin-based journal Sociologia Internationalis. On December 11, 1970, he was appointed Professor Emeritus Immovable of the Faculty of Law of the National University of Mexico.

He also attended conferences in Morelia (1955), Durango (1957), Zacatecas (1958), Ciudad Victoria (1959), Toluca (1960), Mexico, D.F. (1960, 1963, 1965, 1968). In other countries: New York (1949, 1960, 1962, 1965), Havana (1953), Santiago de Chile (1956), Washington, D.C. (1957, 1962), San José de Costa Rica (1961), Bonn, West Berlin and Heidelberg (1961), Münster (1961 and 1967), Barcelona (1966, 1967), Coimbra, Portugal (1967), and Buenos Aires (1968). He contributed to professional journals in Mexico, Spain, Puerto Rico, Colombia, Italy, France, and West Germany.

== Honors and awards ==
He was awarded the Mauricio Serrahima scholarship, founded by the Bar Association of Barcelona, during the academic years 1922-1923 and 1923-1924.

The University of San Carlos, Guatemala, awarded him an honorary doctorate in 1943 and he was appointed Honorary Member of Guatemala’s El Derecho University Association in 1943.

== Memberships ==
Named a member of the Berlin Honor Society of Legal Philosophy in 1928, he resigned in 1933. In 1930-31 he was a member of the Magistrate of the Provincial Court of Administrative Litigation at the Audiencia of Valladolid, as a representative of the Faculty of Law. From 1931 to 1936, he was an executive member of the Francisco de Vitoria Association in Madrid. In 1940 he was named a corresponding member of the Argentine Institute of Legal and Social Philosophy.

He belonged to the Eastern Sociological Society (1949); the American Sociological Association (1949); the American Philosophical Association (1956); the Academy of the Philosophy of Law and Sociology of the Faculty of Law of the UNAM (1971); the Association of Full Time Professors and Researchers at the UNAM; the Board of Directors of the National Association of Lawyers (1940); the Mexican Section of the International Law Association (1970) and the Instituto Cultural Hispano-Mexicano (1965).In 1966 he was appointed corresponding member of the Academy of Sciences and Arts of Puerto Rico.

From 1967 he was a member of the Steering Committee of the International Vereinigung für Rechtsphilosophie, in the Latin American section of the Federal Republic of Germany. He was also a member of the Argentine Institute of Legal and Social Philosophy and a member of the Governing Council of the Santander International Summer University (1934). He was president of the Philosophy section of the Ateneo de Madrid (1934-1936) and Vice President of the Institut International of Philosophie du Droit et Sociologie Juridique, based in Paris (1935-1940).

== Selected works ==
- El sistema filosófico-jurídico expuesto por Platón en su “República.” Barcelona, 1920.
- La filosofía del derecho de Francisco Suárez. Madrid, 1927.
- El actual viraje del socialismo germánico, Madrid, 1928.
- El sentimiento y la idea de lo justo. Psicologismo y objetivismo en la Filosofía del Derecho, Conferencia, Madrid, 1929.
- Estudios de Filosofía el Derecho Internacional. La unidad de la construcción jurídica y el primado del Derecho Internacional, Barcelona, 1930.
- El poder constituyente. Su teoría aplicada al momento español, Madrid, 1931.
- Las teorías políticas de Francisco de Vitoria. Con un estudio sobre el desarrollo de la idea del contrato social, Madrid, 1931.
- Los temas de la filosofía del Derecho. En perspectiva histórica y visión de futuro, Barcelona, 1934.
- Estudios de Filosofía del Derecho, Barcelona, 1936.
- Axiología jurídica: Bases para la estimativa jurídica, Havana, 1939.
- Vida humana, sociedad y derecho. Fundamentación de la Filosofía del Derecho, México, 1939.
- La Filosofía del Derecho en el siglo XX, Mexico City, 1941.
- Lecciones de sociología, Mexico City, 1948.
- Latin-American Legal Philosophy, with Carlos Cossio, Llambías de Azevedo, and Eduardo García Máynez, Cambridge, Massachusetts, 1948.
- Nueva filosofía de la interpretación del derecho, Mexico City, 1956.
- Tratado general de sociología, Mexico City, 1956.
- Tratado general de filosofía del derecho, Mexico City, 1959.
- Panorama del pensamiento jurídico en el siglo XX, Mexico City, 1963.
- El pensamiento jurídico anglosajón y el europeo, Madrid, 1965.
- Introducción al Estudio del Derecho, Mexico City, 1970.
- La naturaleza del pensamiento jurídico, Madrid, 1971.

== Translations ==
Recaséns also translated books by Alois Fischer and Raul Richter, Hans Kelsen, Giorgio Vecchio, Paul Barth, Josef L. Kunz, Emil Brunner, and others.

== Death ==
Luis Recaséns Siches died in Mexico City on July 4, 1977, of a myocardial infarction complicated by non-traumatic respiratory failure. He is buried in the Pantheon Garden.

After his death, the Spanish jurist Joaquín Ruiz Giménez said of him: "His humanism was radically personalist, liberal in the deepest sense, but his human sensibility led him to be repelled by socio-economic injustices and he longed for an authentic democracy that increasing combined freedom and equality.”

== Personal life ==
He spoke French, English, German and Italian.

He first married Juana María Casielles Pañeda, a Spaniard, from whom he was later divorced without issue. On March 27, 1943, he married Martha Díaz de León Hernández, a native of Torreón, Coahuila, Mexico, with whom he had two children: Sebastián, who died young, and Martha Luisa Recaséns Díaz de León, who was born in Mexico City, on February 23, 1944. Martha Luisa married Dr. Pedro B. Crevenna Horney, with whom she had three children, Andrea, Claudia and Matías.
