= 1922 in philosophy =

1922 in philosophy was an Interesting year.

== Publications ==
- John Dewey, Human Nature and Conduct (1922)
- Bertrand Russell, The Problem of China (1922)
- Lucien Lévy-Bruhl, Primitive Mentality (1922)

== Births ==
- January 10 - Michel Henry (died 2002)
- January 20 - John Hick (died 2012)
- January 21 - Predrag Vranicki (died 2002)
- February 9 - Arnold Keyserling (died 2005)
- February 26 - Kurt Rudolf Fischer (died 2014)
- February 27 - Hans Rookmaaker (died 1977)
- March 7 - Akira Yamada (died 2008)
- March 11 - Cornelius Castoriadis (died 1997)
- March 15 - Karl-Otto Apel (died 2017)
- March 17 - Patrick Gardiner (died 1997)
- March 17 - Patrick Suppes (died 2014)
- March 25 - Stephen Toulmin (died 2009)
- April 25 - Krishnananda Saraswati (died 2001)
- April 25 - Tomás Maldonado (died 2018)
- May 3 - Elena Topuridze (died 2004)
- May 5 - Gabriel Nuchelmans (died 1996)
- May 23 - Gerald Holton
- June 21 - Léon Ashkenazi (died 1996)
- June 25 - Shunsuke Tsurumi (died 2015)
- July 16 - Arturo Andrés Roig (died 2012)
- July 18 - Thomas Kuhn (died 1996)
- September 22 - Hussein-Ali Montazeri (died 2009)
- October 5 - Kripalu Maharaj (died 2013)
- October 29 - Aleksandr Zinovyev (died 2006)
- November 9 - Imre Lakatos (died 1974)
- November 11 - Jindřich Zelený (died 1997)
- November 18 - Viktor Grigoryevich Afanasyev (died 1994)
- November 19 - Tomonobu Imamichi (died 2012)
- November 24 - Martti Olavi Siirala (died 2008)
- November 28 - Pinchas Lapide (died 1997)
- November 30 - John Raymond Smythies
- December 19 - Sara Grant (died 2002)
- December 25 - Mohammed Aziz Lahbabi (died 1993)
- December 26 - Matthew Lipman (died 2010)
- Philip Hallie (died 1994)
- Charles Leonard Hamblin (died 1985)
- Leonard Linsky (died 2012)
- William S. Sahakian (died 1986)

== Deaths ==
- February 11 - Gerard Bolland (born 1854)
- February 22 - A. D. Gordon (born 1856)
- February 24 - Alfred Espinas (born 1844)
- April 9 - Emily Elizabeth Constance Jones (born 1848)
- April 10 - Swami Brahmananda (born 1863)
- July 21 - Swami Turiyananda (born 1863)
- August 1 - Paul Barth (sociologist) (born 1858)
- August 4 - Canchupati Venkatrao Venkaswami Rao (born 1922)
- August 29 - Georges Sorel (born 1847)
- September 16 - Gabriel Jean Edmond Séailles (born 1852)
- November 29 - Renzo Novatore (born 1890)
- Tōten Miyazaki (born 1871)
- Lev Tikhomirov
