= Ortega hypothesis =

Theory in the sociology of science

The Ortega hypothesis holds that average or mediocre scientists contribute substantially to the advancement of science. According to this hypothesis, scientific progress occurs mainly by the accumulation of a mass of modest, narrowly specialized intellectual contributions. On this view, major breakthroughs draw heavily upon a large body of minor and little-known work, without which the major advances could not happen.

== Citation research ==
The Ortega hypothesis is widely held, but a number of systematic studies of scientific citations have favored the opposing "Newton hypothesis", which says that scientific progress is mostly the work of a relatively small number of great scientists (after Isaac Newton's statement that he "stood on the shoulders of giants"). The most important papers mostly cite other important papers by a small number of outstanding scientists, suggesting that the breakthroughs do not actually draw heavily on a large body of minor work. Rather, the pattern of citations suggests that most minor work draws heavily on a small number of outstanding papers and outstanding scientists. Even minor papers by the most eminent scientists are cited much more than papers by relatively unknown scientists; and these elite scientists are clustered mostly in a small group of elite departments and universities. The same pattern of disproportionate citation of a small number of scholars appears in fields as diverse as physics and criminology.

The matter is not settled. No research has established that citation counts reflect the real influence or worth of scientific work. So, the apparent disproof of the Ortega hypothesis may be an artifact of inappropriately chosen data. Stratification within the social networks of scientists may skew the citation statistics. Many authors cite research papers without actually reading them or being influenced by them. Experimental results in physics make heavy use of techniques and devices that have been honed by many previous inventors and researchers, but these are seldom cited in reports on those results. Theoretical papers have the broadest relevance to future research, while reports of experimental results have a narrower relevance but form the basis of the theories. This suggests that citation counts merely favor theoretical results.

== The name ==
The name of the hypothesis refers to José Ortega y Gasset, who wrote in The Revolt of the Masses that "astoundingly mediocre" men of narrow specialties do most of the work of experimental science. Ortega most likely would have disagreed with the hypothesis that has been named after him, as he held not that scientific progress is driven mainly by the accumulation of small works by mediocrities, but that scientific geniuses create a framework within which intellectually commonplace people can work successfully. For example, Ortega thought that Albert Einstein drew upon the ideas of Immanuel Kant and Ernst Mach to form his own synthesis, and that Einstein did not draw upon masses of tiny results produced systematically by mediocrities. According to Ortega, science is mostly the work of geniuses, and geniuses mostly build on each other's work, but in some fields there is a real need for systematic laboratory work that could be done by almost anyone.

The "Ortega hypothesis" derives only from this last element of Ortega's theory, not the main thrust of it. Ortega characterized this type of research as "mechanical work of the mind" that does not require special talent or even much understanding of the results, performed by people who specialize in one narrow corner of one science and hold no curiosity beyond it.

== See also ==
- Attention inequality
