= Vicente Gaos =

Spanish poet and essayist

Vicente Gaos (Valencia, March 27, 1919 - Valencia, October 17, 1980) was a Spanish poet and essayist. He was the brother of José and Lola Gaos. He received the Premio Adonais in 1943 for Arcángel de mi noche and was posthumously awarded the Nacional de Poesía in 1980.

Gaos was born into a family of artists and intellectuals whose influence was always present in his literary activities. Licensed in philosophy and literature by University of Madrid, Vicente Gaos went on to gain a Doctorate from the National University of Mexico and was a Spanish Literature professor in several North-American and European universities. One of his great accomplishments was his extensive annotated edition of Don Quixote, which was published posthumously, but he is still most well-known for his poetry.

His most renowned works are: Arcángel de mi noche, Sobre la tierra, Un montón de sombras and Última thule. In 2017 his daughter generously donated his personal library of over 5,000 volumes, to the Biblioteca Valenciana.
