= Holism =

Philosophical theory

Holism is the interdisciplinary idea that systems possess properties as wholes apart from the properties of their component parts. The aphorism "The whole is greater than the sum of its parts", is often given as a summary of this proposal. The concept of holism can inform the methodology for a broad array of scientific fields and lifestyle practices. When applications of holism are said to reveal properties of a whole system beyond those of its parts, these qualities are referred to as emergent properties of that system. Holism in all contexts is often placed in opposition to reductionism, a dominant notion in the philosophy of science that systems containing parts contain no unique properties beyond those parts. Proponents of holism consider the search for emergent properties within systems to be demonstrative of their perspective.

== Background ==
Smuts considered natural processes (such as evolution) to contain emergent properties.

The term "holism" was coined by Jan Smuts (1870–1950) in his 1926 book Holism and Evolution. While he never assigned a consistent meaning to the word, Smuts used holism to represent at least three features of reality. First, holism claims that every scientifically measurable thing, either physical or psychological, does possess a nature as a whole beyond its parts. His examples include atoms, cells, or an individual's personality. Smuts discussed this sense of holism in his claim that an individual's body and mind are not completely separated but instead connect and represent the holistic idea of a person. In his second sense, Smuts referred to holism as the cause of evolution. He argued that evolution is neither an accident nor is it brought about by the actions of some transcendent force, such as a God. Smuts criticized writers who emphasized Darwinian concepts of natural selection and genetic variation to support an accidental view of natural processes within the universe. Smuts perceived evolution as the process of nature correcting itself creatively and intentionally. In this way, holism is described as the tendency of a whole system to creatively respond to environmental stressors, a process in which parts naturally work together to bring the whole into more advanced states. Smuts used Pavlovian studies to argue that the inheritance of behavioral changes supports his idea of creative evolution as opposed to purely accidental development in nature. Smuts believed that this creative process was intrinsic within all physical systems of parts and ruled out indirect, transcendent forces. Finally, Smuts used holism to explain the concrete (nontranscendent) nature of the universe in general. In his words, holism is "the ultimate synthetic, ordering, organizing, regulative activity in the universe which accounts for all the structural groupings and syntheses in it." Smuts argued that a holistic view of the universe explains its processes and their evolution more effectively than a reductive view.

Professional philosophers of science and linguistics did not consider Holism and Evolution seriously upon its initial publication in 1926 and the work has received criticism for a lack of theoretical coherence. Some biological scientists, however, did offer favorable assessments shortly after its first print. Over time, the meaning of the word holism became most closely associated with Smuts' first conception of the term, yet without any metaphysical commitments to monism, dualism, or similar concepts which can be inferred from his work.

== Scientific applications ==
=== Physics ===
==== Nonseparability ====
The advent of holism in the 20th century coincided with the gradual development of quantum mechanics. Holism in physics is the nonseparability of physical systems from their parts, especially quantum phenomena. Classical physics cannot be regarded as holistic, as the behavior of individual parts represents the whole. However, the state of a system in quantum theory resists a certain kind of reductive analysis. For example, two spatially separated quantum systems are described as "entangled," or nonseparable from each other, when a meaningful analysis of one system is indistinguishable from that of the other. There are different conceptions of nonseparability in physics and its exploration is considered to broadly present insight into the ontological problem.

==== Variants ====
In one sense, holism in physics is a perspective about the best way to understand the nature of a physical system. In this sense, holism is the methodological claim that systems are accurately understood according to their properties as a whole. A methodological reductionist in physics might seek to explain, for example, the behavior of a liquid by examining its component molecules, atoms, ions or electrons. A methodological holist, on the other hand, believes there is something misguided about this approach; one proponent, a condensed matter physicist, puts it: “the most important advances in this area come about by the emergence of qualitatively new concepts at the intermediate or macroscopic levels—concepts which, one hopes, will be compatible with one's information about the microscopic constituents, but which are in no sense logically dependent on it.” This perspective is considered a conventional attitude among contemporary physicists.

In another sense, holism is a metaphysical claim that the nature of a system is not determined by the properties of its component parts. There are three varieties of this sense of physical holism.

- Ontological holism: some systems are not merely composed of their physical parts
- Property holism: some systems have properties independent of their physical parts
- Nomological holism: some systems follow physical laws beyond the laws followed by their physical parts

This Feynman diagram illustrates the path of an electron (e−) and a positron (e+) within a quantum field that could be described in terms of Bohmian mechanics.

The metaphysical claim does not assert that physical systems involve abstract properties beyond the composition of its physical parts, but that there are concrete properties aside from those of its basic physical parts. Theoretical physicist David Bohm (1917-1992) supported this view head-on. Bohm believed that a complete description of the universe would have to go beyond a simple list of all its particles and their positions, because there would also have to be a physical quantum field associated with the properties of those particles guiding their trajectories. Bohm's ontological holism concerning the nature of whole physical systems was literal. Niels Bohr (1885-1962), on the other hand, presented ontological holism from an epistemological angle, rather than a literal one. Bohr regarded an observational apparatus as a part of a system under observation, besides the basic physical parts themselves. His theory agrees with Bohm that whole systems are not merely composed of their parts and it identifies properties such as position and momentum as those of whole systems beyond those of its components. But Bohr states that these holistic properties are only meaningful in experimental contexts when physical systems are under observation and that these systems, when not under observation, cannot be said to have meaningful properties, even if these properties took place outside our observation. While Bohr claims these holistic properties exist only insofar as they can be observed, Bohm took his ontological holism one step further by claiming these properties must exist regardless.

=== Linguistics ===
Semantic holism suggests that the meaning of individual words depends on the meaning of other words, forming a large web of interconnections. In general, meaning holism states that the properties which determine the meaning of a word are connected such that if the meaning of one word changes, the meaning of every other word in the web changes as well. The set of words that alter in meaning due to a change in the meaning of some other is not necessarily specified in meaning holism, but typically such a change is taken straightforwardly to affect the meaning of every word in the language.

In scientific disciplines, reductionism is the opposing viewpoint to holism. But in the context of linguistics or the philosophy of language, reductionism is typically referred to as atomism. Specifically, atomism states that each word's meaning is independent and so there are no emergent properties within a language. Additionally, there is meaning molecularism which states that a change in one word alters the meaning of only a relatively small set of other words.

The linguistic perspective of meaning holism is traced back to an essay by WV Quine but was subsequently formalized by analytic philosophers Michael Dummett, Jerry Fodor, and Ernest Lepore. While this holistic approach attempts to resolve a classical problem for the philosophy of language concerning how words convey meaning, there is debate over its validity mostly from two angles of criticism: opposition to compositionality and, especially, instability of meaning. The first claims that meaning holism conflicts with the compositionality of language. Meaning in some languages is compositional in that meaning comes from the structure of an expression's parts. Meaning holism suggests that the meaning of words plays an inferential role in the meaning of other words: "pet fish" might imply a meaning of "less than 3 ounces." Since holistic views of meaning assume meaning depends on which words are used and how those words confer meaning onto other words, rather than how they are structured, meaning holism stands in conflict with compositionalism and leaves statements with potentially ambiguous meanings. The second criticism claims that meaning holism makes meaning in language unstable. If some words must be used to infer the meaning of other words, then in order to communicate a message, the sender and the receiver must share an identical set of inferential assumptions or beliefs. If these beliefs were different, meaning may be lost.

Many types of communication would be directly affected by the principles of meaning holism such as informative communication, language learning, and communication about psychological states. Nevertheless, some meaning holists maintain that the instability of meaning holism is an acceptable feature from several different angles. In one example, contextual holists make this point simply by suggesting we often do not actually share identical inferential assumptions but instead rely on context to counter differences of inference and support communication.

=== Biology ===
Systems biology aims to understand how genes and proteins function together to form organisms like this animal cell.

Scientific applications of holism within biology are referred to as systems biology. The opposing analytical approach of systems biology is biological organization which models biological systems and structures only in terms of their component parts. "The reductionist approach has successfully identified most of the components and many of the interactions but, unfortunately, offers no convincing concepts or methods to understand how system properties emerge...the pluralism of causes and effects in biological networks is better addressed by observing, through quantitative measures, multiple components simultaneously and by rigorous data integration with mathematical models." The objective in systems biology is to advance models of the interactions in a system. Holistic approaches to modelling have involved cellular modelling strategies, genomic interaction analysis, and phenotype prediction.

==== Systems medicine ====
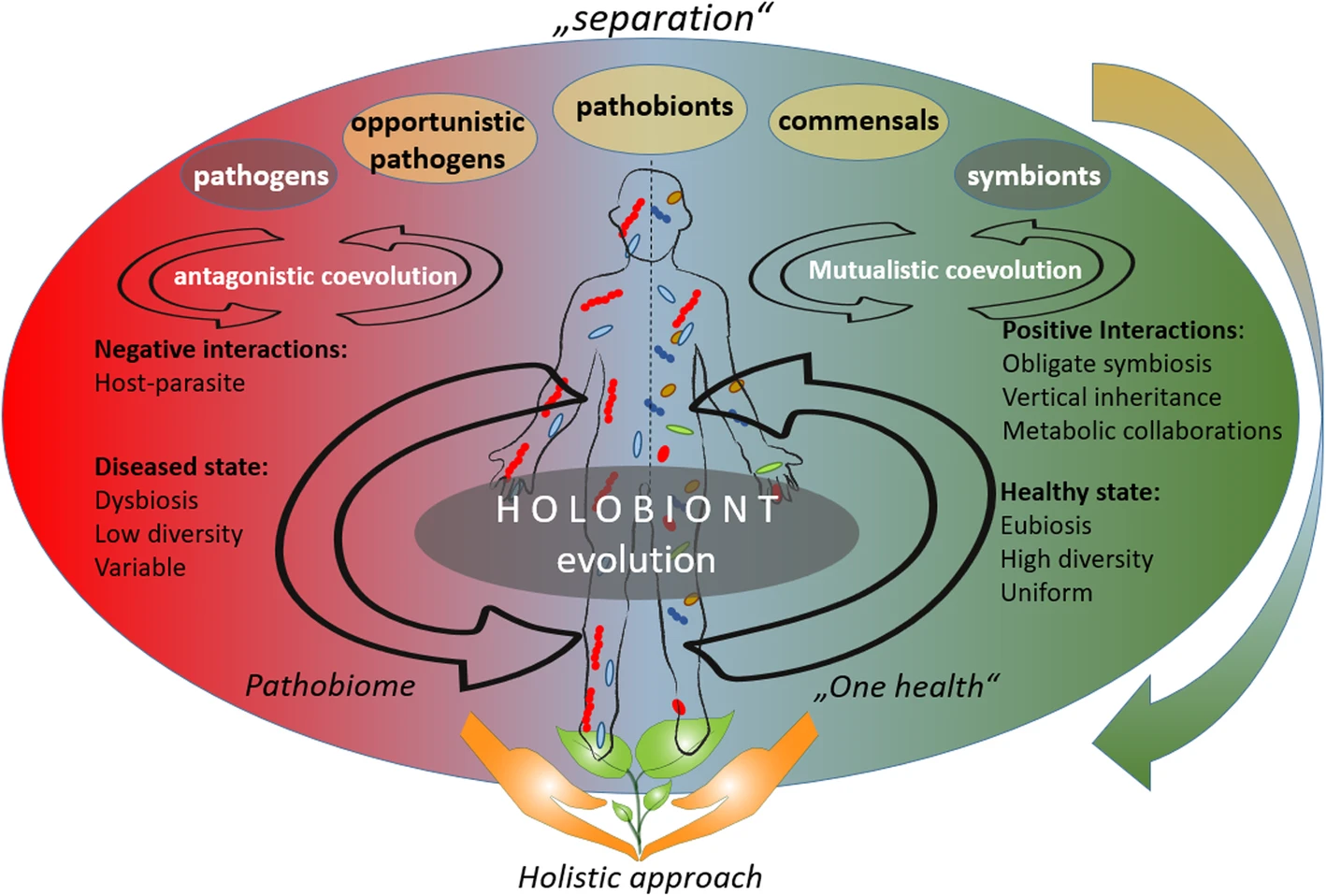
Systems medicine considers holism to better understand part-whole relationships as with microbial-host coevolution.

Systems medicine is a practical approach to systems biology and accepts its holistic assumptions. Systems medicine takes the systems of the human body as made up of a complete whole and uses this as a starting point in its research and, ultimately, treatment.

== Lifestyle applications ==
The term holism is also sometimes used in the context of various lifestyle practices, such as dieting, education, and healthcare, to refer to ways of life that either supplement or replace conventional practices. In these contexts, holism is not necessarily a rigorous or well-defined methodology for obtaining a particular lifestyle outcome. It is sometimes simply an adjective to describe practices which account for factors that standard forms of these practices may discount, especially in the context of alternative medicine.

== See also ==
- Confirmation holism
- Emergence
- Emergentism
- Holism and Evolution
- Holism in ecological anthropology
- Holistic education
- Holon (philosophy)
- Holarchy
- Isomorphism
- Logical holism aka Theoretical holism
- Mereology
- Monism
- Reductionism
- Systems theory
- Perfect Interpenetration
