= Xavier Zubiri =

Spanish philosopher (1898–1983)

- Born: 4 December 1898; San Sebastián, Spain
- Died: 21 September 1983 (aged 84); Madrid, Spain

Education
- Education: Complutense University of Madrid
- Doctoral advisor: José Ortega y Gasset

Philosophical work
- Era: 20th-century philosophy
- Region: Western philosophy
- School: Continental philosophy Madrid School
- Institutions: Complutense University of Madrid
- Main interests: Metaphysics
- Notable ideas: Noology

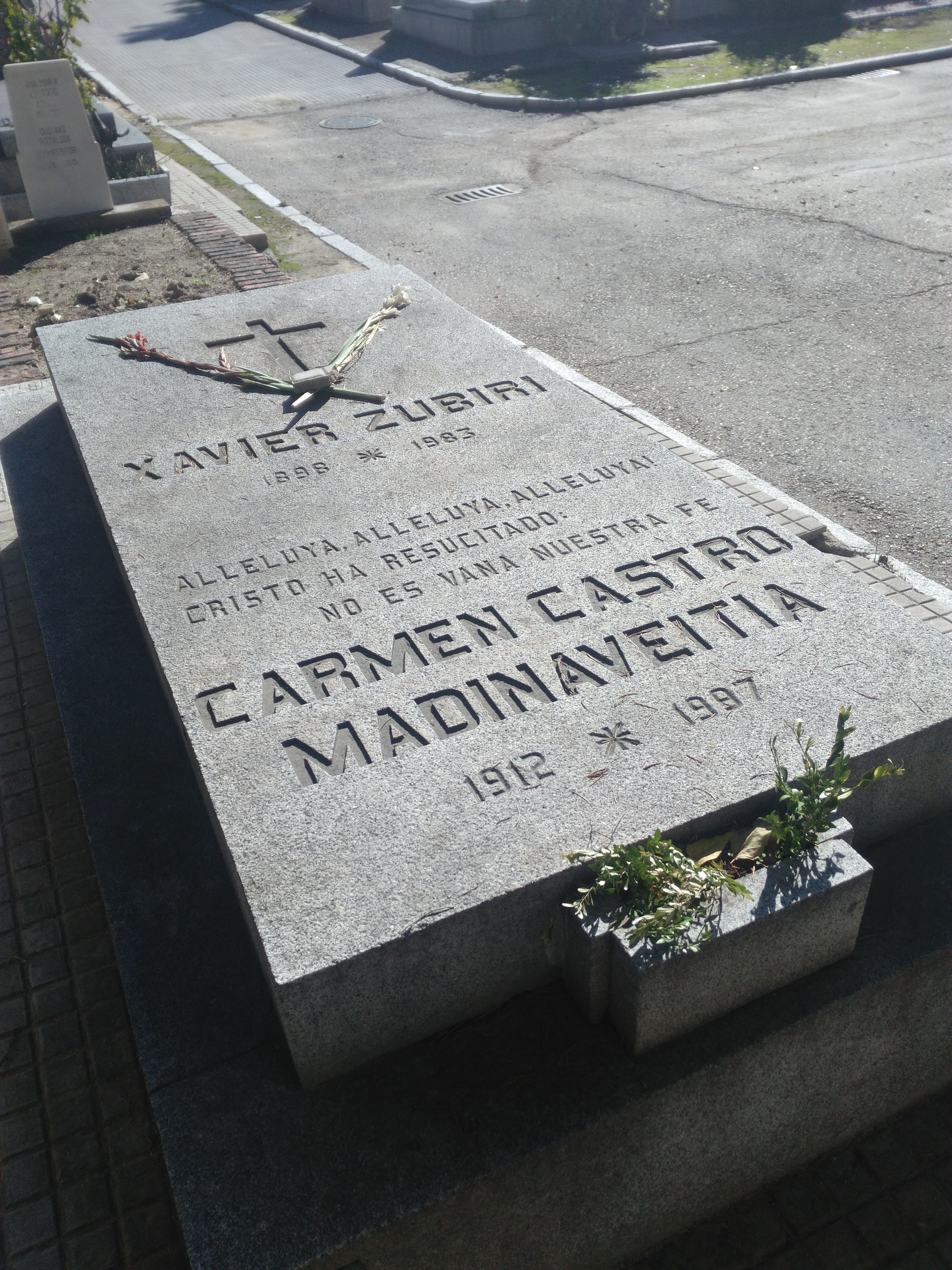
Zubiri's grave in the Cementerio de la Almudena

Xavier Zubiri (/zuːˈbɪəri/; Spanish: [θuˈβiɾi]; 4 December 1898 – 21 September 1983) was a Spanish philosopher.

Zubiri was a member of the Madrid School, composed of philosophers José Ortega y Gasset (the founder of the group), José Gaos, and Julián Marías, among others. Zubiri's philosophy has been categorized as a "materialist open realism", which "attempted to reformulate classical metaphysics, in a language that was entirely compatible with modern science".

== Biography ==
Zubiri first received a philosophical and theological formation in Madrid and Rome. Later, he deepened his studies in philosophy through his graduate studies in Louvain, writing his dissertation on phenomenology. In 1929, Zubiri's critical interest in this current of thought took him to Freiburg, when he already was a professor in Madrid. There, he studied with Edmund Husserl and Martin Heidegger. In 1930, Zubiri moved to Berlin, where he studied physics, philology and biology. There, he was hosted in Harnack House, which enabled Zubiri to socialize with important minds of this great period of academic activity in the Weimar Republic. For example, Albert Einstein (whom Zubiri had already met in Madrid, at Universidad Central, in 1923), Max Planck, Werner Jaeger, Erwin Schrödinger, among others.

When the Spanish Civil War broke out in Spain in 1936, Zubiri moved to Paris. There, he continued having an intensive intellectual life, attending courses with Louis de Broglie, Frédéric Joliot, Irène Curie, Elie Joseph Cartan and Emile Benveniste, among others. In 1939, just before France declared war with Germany, Zubiri returned to Spain. Zubiri's philosophy is little known outside of Spain and Latin America, mostly because Zubiri was compelled to resign from formal academic positions in Spain, in 1942. This had to do with the lack of academic freedoms in Francisco Franco's regime. However, it was possible for Zubiri to continue his work as an academic, through the sponsorship of family and friends. Zubiri was a prolific author in the Spanish magazines Cruz y Raya (led by José Bergamín) and Revista de Occidente (led by José Ortega y Gasset) under the second Spanish republic. However, after his resignation from Spanish universities, Zubiri did not publish much in established peer reviewed journals. Nonetheless, he did publish a series of books and research articles. Zubiri's work was initially not well received by established academic environments in Spain. This was mostly explained by the political context under Franco. But Zubiri's relationship to scholars like Ignacio Ellacuría made Zubiri's work widely known in Latin America, where Zubiri's thought has been further developed. Recently, Spanish academics have begun to recognize the importance of Zubiri's life and philosophy.

Despite his relative academic isolation at home in Spain, Zubiri has also been recognized in other countries. For the same reasons outlined above, Zubiri's contact with the formal academic environments of the English speaking world was limited. There is all but one recorded visit by Zubiri to the United States, specifically Princeton University, on October 2, 1946. In Princeton, Zubiri lectured in French on "The real and mathematics- A philosophical problem" ("Le reel et les mathematiques—Un probleme de philosophie"). Some of Zubiri's work has been translated to English: "On Essence" (Caponigri, 1980), "Sentient Intelligence" (Fowler, 1999), "The Dynamic Structure of Reality" (Orringer, 2003) and "The Fundamental problems of Western Metaphysics" (Redondo & Fowler 2009). In 1979, the German government awarded Zubiri and Laín Entralgo the Order of Merit of the Federal Republic of Germany. Zubiri was awarded this distinction for his work in his books Nature, History, God (1954) and On Essence (1962). Zubiri's work has also been translated to French, German, Italian and Portuguese.

== Bibliography ==
This overview is taken from a more extensive list of articles and books by and about Xavier Zubiri. This list is continuously updated by "Fundación Xavier Zubiri".

- Naturaleza, Historia, Dios (1944)
- Sobre la esencia (1ª ed. 1962 en Soc.E y P; 6ª edición ya en Alianza, 1998)
- Cinco lecciones de filosofía (1ª ed., 1963 en Soc.E y P; 1ª reimpresión en Alianza, 1997);
- Inteligencia sentiente. *Inteligencia y realidad (Soc.E y P, 1980; 50 ed. Alianza/F.XZ.);
- Inteligencia y logos (Soc.E y P/Alianza, 1982)
- Inteligencia y razón (Soc.E y P/Alianza, 1983)
- El hombre y Dios (1ª ed. a cargo de Ignacio Ellacuría, 1984)
- Sobre el hombre (1ª ed. a cargo de Ignacio Ellacuría, 1986)
- Estructura dinámica de la realidad (1989, ed. a cargo de Diego Gracia)
- Sobre el sentimiento y la volición (1992, ed. a cargo de Diego Gracia)
- El problema filosófico de la historia de las religiones (1993, a cargo de Antonio González)
- Los problemas fundamentales de la Metafísica occidental (1994, a cargo de Antonio Pintor Ramos)
- Espacio. Tiempo. Materia (1996, Segunda edición revisada 2008)
- El problema teologal del hombre: Cristianismo (1997, a cargo de Antonio González)
- El hombre y la verdad (1999, a cargo de Juan Antonio Nicolás)
- Primeros escritos (1921–1926), ed. de 2000, por Antonio Pintor Ramos
- Sobre la realidad (2001, a cargo de José Antonio Martínez)
- Sobre el problema de la filosofía y otros escritos (1932–1944), 1ª ed. de 2002, a cargo de Germán Marquínez Argote
- El hombre: lo real y lo irreal (1ª ed. 2005, a cargo de Jesús Conill)
- Tres dimensiones del ser humano: individual, social, histórica (1ª ed. 2006, a cargo de Jordi Corominas)
- Escritos menores (1953–1983) (1ª ed. de 2007, a cargo de Germán Marquínez Argote)
- Cursos universitarios I (1ª ed. 2007, a cargo de Manuel Mazón)
- Cinco lecciones de filosofía – Con un nuevo curso inédito (2009, a cargo de Antonio Pintor Ramos)
- Cursos Universitarios, vol. II (2010, a cargo de Manuel Mazón)
- Acerca del mundo (2010, a cargo de Antonio González)
- Cursos Universitarios, vol. III (1933–1934). 2012. A cargo de Manuel Mazón
- Fascículo editado por la propia Fundación: Sobre el problema de la filosofía (Madrid, 1996)
