= Julián Marías =

Spanish philosopher (1914–2005)

The Most Excellent Julián Marías OAXS
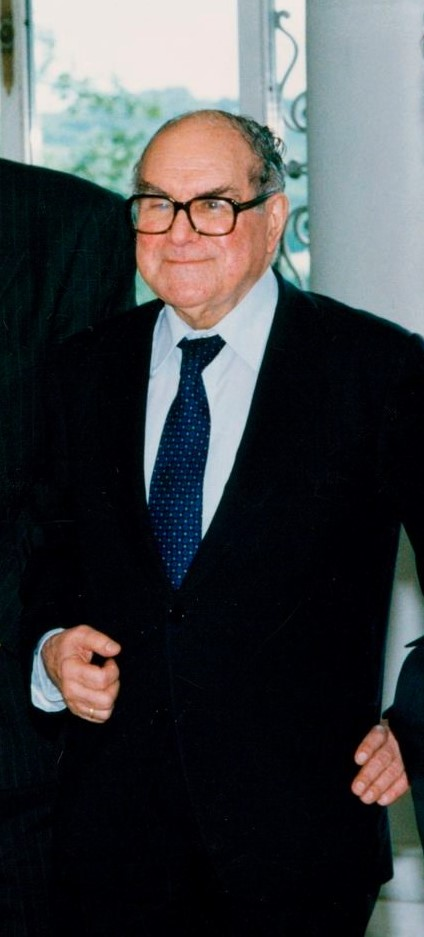
- Julián Marías
- Born: Julián Marías Aguilera; 17 June 1914; Valladolid, Spain
- Died: 15 December 2005 (aged 91); Madrid, Spain
- Occupations: Philosopher, writer, professor and essayist
- Years active: 1930s–2005
- Era: 20th-century philosophy, Contemporary philosophy
- Partner: Dolores Franco Manera
- Children: 4
- Relatives: Jesús Franco (brother-in-law)

Seat S of the Real Academia Española
- In office 20 June 1965 – 15 December 2005
- Preceded by: Wenceslao Fernández Flórez
- Succeeded by: Salvador Gutiérrez Ordóñez

Julián Marías Aguilera (17 June 1914 – 15 December 2005) was a Spanish philosopher associated with the Generation of '36 movement. He was a pupil of the Spanish philosopher José Ortega y Gasset and member of the Madrid School.

== Life and work ==
Marías was born in the city of Valladolid, and moved to Madrid at the age of five. He went on to study philosophy at the Complutense University of Madrid, graduating in 1936. Within months of his graduation the Spanish Civil War broke out. During the conflict Marías sided with the Republicans, although his actual contributions were limited to propaganda articles and broadcasts.

After the end of the war in 1939, Marías was imprisoned for several months on false charges, and was unable to carry out university teaching activities after his release. His doctoral thesis was rejected due to the committee's animosity towards someone who was a disciple of Ortega. In 1940, his History of Philosophy was published — his first work published after the civil war — and although it ended up being a great publishing success, it led him to go through a period of financial difficulties due to his being banned from teaching by the Franco regime, and so Marías instead supported himself with private classes and translations.

In 1948 he co-founded, along with his former teacher José Ortega y Gasset, the Instituto de Humanidades (which he went on to head after the death of Ortega in 1955). Between the late 1940s and the 1970s, being unable to teach in Spain, Marías taught at numerous institutions in the United States, including Harvard University, Yale University, Wellesley College, the University of Oklahoma, and UCLA.

Marías wrote on a wide variety of subjects during his long career. A subject of particular interest was Miguel de Cervantes' Don Quixote. In 1964 he was elected into the Real Academia Española, and he won a Prince of Asturias award in 1996.

He is the father of novelist Javier Marías and art historian Fernando Marías, and married the sister of director Jesús Franco.

== Works ==
- Juventud en el mundo antiguo. Crucero universitario por el Mediterráneo, Espasa-Calpe, Madrid, 1934
- Historia de la filosofía, with a prologue by Xavier Zubiri, epilogue by José Ortega y Gasset, Revista de Occidente, Madrid 1941 (28th ed., 1976)
- La filosofía del Padre Gratry. La restauración de la Metafísica en el problema de Dios y de la persona, Escorial, Madrid 1941
- Miguel de Unamuno, Espasa Calpe, Madrid, 1943
- El tema del hombre, Revista de Occidente, Madrid, 1943
- San Anselmo y el insensato y otros estudios de filosofía, Revista de Occidente, Madrid, 1944
- Introducción a la filosofía, Revista de Occidente, Madrid, 1947
- La filosofía española actual. Unamuno, Ortega, Morente, Zubiri, Espasa Calpe, Madrid, 1948
- El método histórico de las generaciones, Revista de Occidente, Madrid, 1949
- Ortega y tres antípodas. Un ejemplo de intriga intelectual, Revista de Occidente, Buenos Aires, 1950
- Biografía de la Filosofía, Emecé, Buenos Aires, 1954
- Ensayos de teoría, Barna, Barcelona, 1954
- Idea de la Metafísica, Columba, Buenos Aires, 1954
- La estructura social. Teoría y método, Sociedad de Estudios y Publicaciones, Madrid, 1955
- Filosofía actual y existencialismo en España, Revista de Occidente, Madrid, 1955
- El oficio del pensamiento, Biblioteca Nueva, Madrid, 1958
- La Escuela de Madrid. Estudios de filosofía española, Emecé, Buenos Aires, 1959
- Ortega. I. Circunstancia y vocación, Revista de Occidente, Madrid, 1960
- Los españoles, Revista de Occidente, Madrid. 1962
- La España posible en tiempo de Carlos III, Sociedad de Estudios y Publicaciones, Madrid, 1963
- El tiempo que ni vuelve ni tropieza, Edhasa, Barcelona, 1964
- Análisis de los Estados Unidos, Guadarrama, Madrid, 1968
- Antropología metafísica. La estructura empírica de la vida humana, Revista de Occidente, Madrid, 1970
- Visto y no visto. Crónicas de cine, Guadarrama, Madrid, 1970, 2 vols.
- Imagen de la India e Israel: una resurrección, Revista de Occidente, Madrid, 1973
- Problemas del cristianismo, BAC, Madrid, 1979
- La mujer en el siglo XX, Alianza, Madrid, 1980
- Ortega. II. Las trayectorias, Alianza, Madrid, 1983
- España inteligible. Razón histórica de las Españas, Alianza, Madrid, 1985
- La mujer y su sombra, Alianza, Madrid, 1986
- Ser español, Planeta, Barcelona, 1987
- Una vida presente. Memorias, Alianza, Madrid, 1988–1989, 3 vols.: I (1914–1951), II (1951–1975), III (1975–1989).
- La felicidad humana, Alianza, Madrid 1989
- Generaciones y constelaciones, Alianza, Madrid, 1989
- Cervantes, clave española, Alianza, Madrid, 1990
- Acerca de Ortega, Espasa Calpe, Madrid, 1991
- La educación sentimental, Alianza, Madrid, 1992
- Razón de la filosofía, Alianza, Madrid, 1993
- Mapa del mundo personal, Alianza, Madrid 1993
- El cine de Julián Marías. Escritos sobre cine, compilation edited by Fernando Alonso, Royal Books, Barcelona, 1994, 2 vols.
- Tratado de lo mejor, Alianza, Madrid, 1995
- Persona, Alianza, Madrid, 1996
- Sobre el cristianismo, Planeta Testimonio, Barcelona, 1997
- El curso del tiempo, Tomos I y II, Alianza, 1998. 2 vols.
- Tratado sobre la convivencia, Martínez Roca, Barcelona 2000
- Entre dos siglos, Alianza, Madrid, 2002
- Obras, Revista de Occidente / Alianza Editorial, Madrid 1958–1970, 10 vols.

=== Selected works in translation ===
- Reason and Life: The Introduction to Philosophy, trans. Kenneth S. Reid and Edward Sarmiento (New Haven: Yale University Press, 1956).
- History of Philosophy, trans. Stanley Appelbaum and Clarence C. Strowbridge (New York: Dover Publications, 1966).
- Miguel de Unamuno, trans. Frances M. López-Morillas (Cambridge, Mass.: Harvard University Press, 1966).
- José Ortega y Gasset: Circumstance and Vocation, trans. Frances M. López-Morillas (Norman: University of Oklahoma Press, 1970).
- Metaphysical Anthropology: The Empirical Structure of Human Life, trans. Frances M. López-Morillas (University Park: The Pennsylvania State University Press, 1971).
- Philosophy as Dramatic Theory, trans. James Parsons (University Park: The Pennsylvania State University Press, 1971).
- Generations: A Historical Method, trans. Harold C. Raley (University: University of Alabama Press, 1971).
- America in the Fifties and Sixties: Julián Marías on the United States, trans. Blanche De Puy and Harold C. Raley (University Park: The Pennsylvania State University Press, 1971).
- A Biography of Philosophy, trans. Harold C. Raley (University: University of Alabama Press, 1987).
- The Structure of Society, trans. Harold C. Raley with an introduction by Robert K. Merton (University: University of Alabama Press, 1987).
- Understanding Spain, trans. Frances M. López-Morillas (Ann Arbor: University of Michigan Press, 1990).
- Gratry's Philosophy, trans. Mary L. O'Hara (Adelaide: ATF Press, 1991).
- The Christian Perspective, trans. Harold C. Raley (Houston: Halcyon Press, 2000).
- Persona (forthcoming).
