= Attention inequality =

Term used to explain attention distribution across social media

Attention inequality is the inequality of distribution of attention across users on social networks, people in general, and for scientific papers. Yun Family Foundation introduced "Attention Inequality Coefficient" as a measure of inequality in attention and arguments it by the close interconnection with wealth inequality.

== Relationship to economic inequality ==
Attention inequality is related to economic inequality since attention is an economically scarce good. The same measures and concepts as in classical economy can be applied for attention economy. The relationship develops also beyond the conceptual level—considering the AIDA process, attention is the prerequisite for real monetary income on the Internet. On data of 2018, a significant relationship between likes and comments on Facebook to donations is proven for non-profit organizations.

== Attention economy ==
The attention economy refers to the practice of maximizing the attention users give to a product for advertising-related reasons. Attention economy remains one of the most common forms of advertising, and has been steadily increasing thanks to new technologies such as television, internet and social media. It is one of the most widely-used approaches in economy and advertising for its effectiveness on maximising the audience reach of a certain product.

== Attention inequality in social media ==
In social media, attention inequality refers to the unequal distribution of users' attention on social media platforms. This means that instead of an equal distribution of attention, fewer sources receive a disproportionate share of attention, leaving many unnoticed. This phenomenon is possibly the result of social media algorithms, which are commonly designed to drive maximum engagement.

This phenomenon is a large factor in the polarization and creation of echo-chambers. Social media algorithms tend to note content that is already performing well and display it to more users, while content that is equally engaging or well-made is not recommended to users. Terms such as Clickbait and Ragebait have been coined to describe provocative content created to gain online reactions. When multiple users interact with the post, it signals the algorithm that the specific post drives engagement. The algorithm then tends to recommend that type of content to an exponential number of people, potentially outperforming neutral content.

These factors, when combined, tend to create an unequal social media environment.

== Attention inequality in science ==
According to a 2025 study about research inequality among scientists published in Information Processing and Management, scientific discourse is restricted to a small group of connected scientists, and is frequently not an accurate representation of the whole scientific community.

Using citation-network analysis in the fields of nanoscience and chemical physics, the study claims that a group of connected scientists has a significant notability in the scientific community. The calculated connection strength between these scientists is estimated to be about 4.5, the study also says that these authors cite each other four times more often than would be predicted in a random network, whereas ordinary scientists that exist outside of this group only reach an estimated connection strength of 0.9.

== Extent ==
As data of 2008 shows, 50% of the attention is concentrated on approximately 0.2% of all hostnames, and 80% on 5% of hostnames. The Gini coefficient of attention distribution lay in 2008 at over 0.921 for such commercial domains names as ac.jp and at 0.985 for .org-domains.

The Gini coefficient was measured on Twitter in 2016 for the number of followers as 0.9412, for the number of mentions as 0.9133, and for the number of retweets as 0.9034. For comparison, the world's income Gini coefficient was 0.68 in 2005 and 0.904 in 2018. More than 96% of all followers, 93% of the retweets, and 93% of all mentions are owned by 20% of Twitter.

== Causes ==
At least for scientific papers, today's consensus states that inequality is unexplainable by variations of quality and individual talent. The Matthew effect plays a significant role in the emergence of attention inequality—those who already enjoy large amounts of attention get even more attention, and those who do not lose even more. Ranking algorithms based on relevance to the user have been found to alleviate the inequality of the number of posts across topics.

== See also ==
- Attention economy
- Cumulative advantage
- Cumulative inequality theory
- Dominant narrative
- Doomscrolling
- Egotism
- Empathy gap
- Famous for being famous
- Filter bubble
- First World privilege
- Kardashian index
- Knowledge gap hypothesis
- Law of triviality
- Ortega hypothesis
- Overconsumption
- Pareto distribution
- Privilege hazard
- Rational expectations
- Social invisibility
