= The Dehumanization of Art and Other Essays on Art, Culture, and Literature =

1925 book by José Ortega y Gasset

- Author: José Ortega y Gasset
- Language: English
- Publisher: Princeton University Press
- Publication date: November 1, 1968
- Media type: Print
- Pages: 204
- ISBN: 978-0-691-01961-1

The Dehumanization of Art and Other Essays on Art, Culture, and Literature is the first English translation of philosopher José Ortega y Gasset's La deshumanización del Arte e Ideas sobre la novela, published in 1925. This composition includes three more essays in addition to Ortega's original work.

The essays seek to understand and explain the relatively new movement of nonrepresentational art and defend these pioneering artists attempting to escape from the embraced realism and romanticism movements. The dehumanization of art refers to the removal of human elements from these works, eliminating the content, but keeping the form. In his work, Ortega explains how the untrained eye, which is used to seeing only content in traditional paintings, must find a new approach to viewing the work of art.

== See also ==
- Generation of '27
