= Mildred Adams =

Mildred Adams Kenyon (1894 – November 5, 1980, New York City) was an American journalist, writer, translator, and critic of Spanish literature.

== Biography ==
Mildred Adams graduated from the University of California with a degree in economics. She moved to New York City, where she wrote articles for her aunt, Gertrude Foster Brown (1868-1956), an early woman's suffrage leader who was then managing editor of Woman's Journal. She soon became a feature writer and book reviewer for the New York Times and various magazines, including the London Economist. She interviewed Calvin Coolidge, Huey Long, and Henry Wallace.

Often in Europe on assignment, she reported on the early days of the League of Nations and the drafting of Spain's 1931 constitution. Her acquaintance with Spanish poet Federico Garcia Lorca in New York in 1929–30, intensified her interest in Spain, and she reported from that country in 1935, a year before the beginning of the Spanish Civil War. This work led to her involvement in helping refugees from that conflict. She was on the board of American Friends of Spanish Democracy and of the Spanish Refugee Relief Campaign, and advised the New World Re-Settlement Fund for Spanish Relief. Later she also helped German intellectuals, liberals, and Jews in exile from Nazi Germany, serving as secretary for the Emergency Rescue Committee, the predecessor of the International Rescue Committee.

In 1935 she married William Houston Kenyon Jr., a prominent patent attorney and graduate of Harvard College and Harvard Law School and author of The First Half-Century of the Kenyon Firm, 1879-1933. Her sister-in-law, Dorothy Kenyon, was also a prominent politically active New York attorney who in 1950 was the first person to appear before the Senate Foreign Relations Subcommittee investigating charges by Sen. Joseph McCarthy concerning membership in Communist-front organizations. Mildred Adams once contemplated writing her biography.

During World War II, she worked in the educational division of the Columbia Broadcasting System.

Adams translated six volumes of the works of Spanish philosopher Jose Ortega y Gasset. In 1966, she published The Right to Be People, on women's suffrage. One of her favorite books - a decades-long project - was a biography of Garcia Lorca, which brought to light new information about the poet's stay in the United States.

Several months after her death, Mildred Adams's papers were deposited in the Arthur and Elizabeth Schlesinger Library on the History of Women in America at Radcliffe College. A small collection of her papers, donated by Mildred Adams Kenyon in 1977, is also available at the Immigration History Research Center Archives, University of Minnesota Libraries.

== Books ==
- A Review of Arbitration, with Special Reference to the Western Hemisphere. New York: National League of Women Voters, Department of International Cooperation to Prevent War, 1927.
- Margaret Sanger: Woman of the Future Crusader. London: Birth Control International Information Centre, 1934. From an article by Mildred Adams in Delineator (September 1933).
- (editor) Memoirs of Malwida von Meysenbug: Rebel in Crinoline. Trans. Elsa von Meysenbug Lyons. New York: W.W. Norton, 1936, and London: G. Allen & Unwin, 1937.
- Getting and Spending: The ABC of Economics. New York: Macmillan, 1939.
- The American Legion Auxiliary: A History, 1934-1944. Indianapolis, IN: The Auxiliary, 1945.
- Britain's Road to Recovery. New York: Foreign Policy Association, 1949. (coauthor: William W. Wade). Reprinted by Kraus Reprint Co. in 1973.
- (editor) Latin America: Evolution or Explosion? New York: Dodd, Mead, 1963. Proceedings of the Conference on Tensions in Development in the Western Hemisphere, held in Salvador, Brazil, in 1962 by the Council on World Tensions. Published in Spanish as America Latina: ?evolucion o explosion? México: Libreros Mexicanos Unidos, 1964.
- The Right to Be People. Philadelphia: Lippincott, 1966.
- García Lorca: Playwright and Poet. New York: G. Braziller, 1977.

== Translations ==
- Ortega y Gasset, Jose. Invertebrate Spain. New York: W.W. Norton, 1937 (with preface by Mildred Adams).
- Arciniegas, Germán. The Knight of El Dorado: The Tale of Don Gonzago Jiménez de Quesada and His Conquest of New Granada, Now Called Colombia. New York: Viking Press, 1942. Reprinted by the Greenwood Press in 1968.
- Ortega y Gasset, Jose. Man and Crisis. New York: W.W. Norton, 1958.
- Ortega y Gasset, Jose. What Is Philosophy?. New York: W.W. Norton, 1961.
- Ortega y Gasset, Jose. Some Lessons in Metaphysics. New York: W.W. Norton, 1969.
- Ortega y Gasset, Jose. The Idea of Principle in Leibniz and the Evolution of Deductive Theory. New York: W.W. Norton, 1971.
- Ortega y Gasset, Jose. An Interpretation of Universal History. New York: W.W. Norton, 1973.

== Archival Collections ==
- Papers, 1936-1963. Schlesinger Library, Radcliffe Institute, Harvard University.
- Mildred Adams Kenyon papers, Immigration History Research Center Archives, University of Minnesota Libraries.
- Works of Mildred Adams
