= Robert Misrahi =

French philosopher (1926–2023)

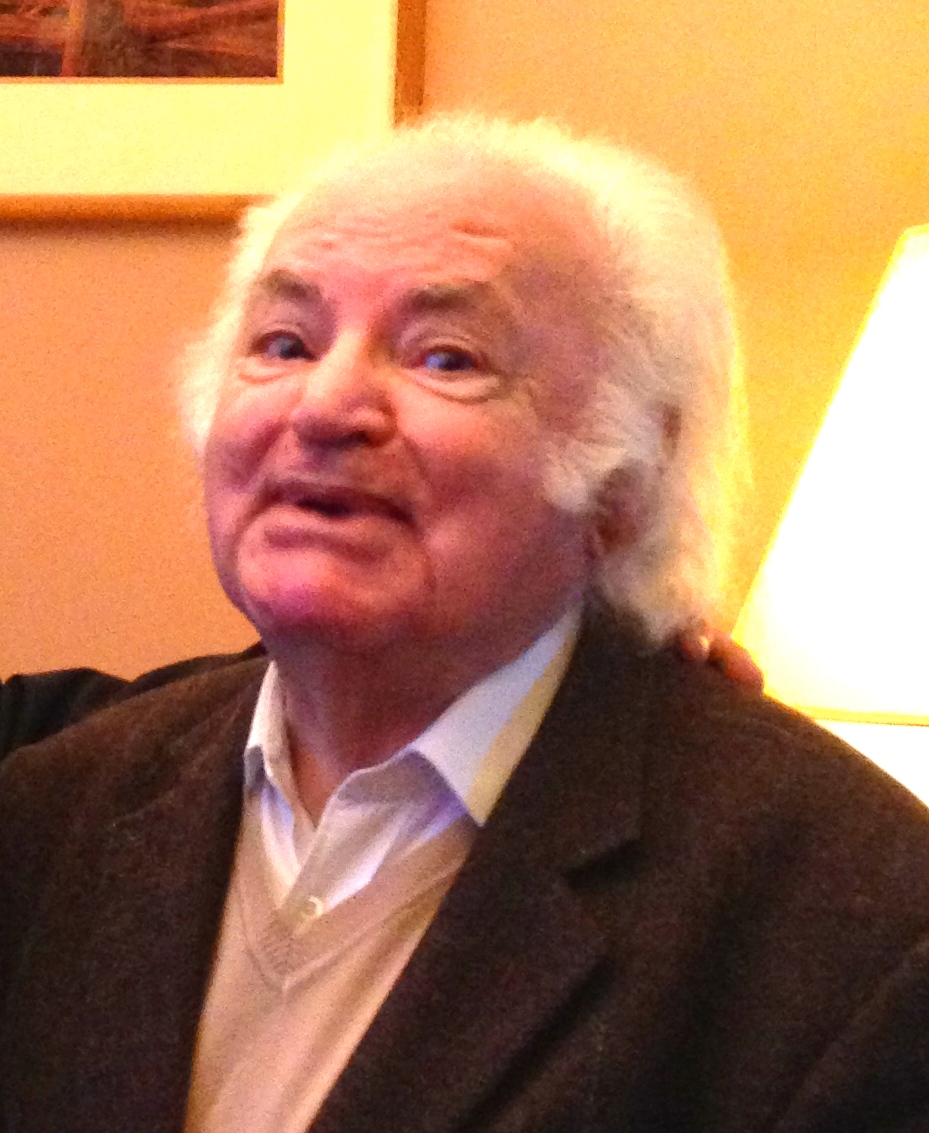
Misrahi in 2014

Robert Misrahi (French: [mizʁa.i]; 3 January 1926 – 1 October 2023) was a French philosopher who specialised in the work of 17th-century Dutch thinker Baruch Spinoza.

== Biography ==
Born in Paris to Turkish-Jewish immigrants, Misrahi studied at the University of Paris (Sorbonne), where he became a protégé of Jean-Paul Sartre. He was the emeritus professor of ethical philosophy at the Université de Paris I (Sorbonne), he has published a number of works on Spinoza and published the essentials of his work on the question of happiness. He has published a number of works in publications including Les Temps modernes, Encyclopædia Universalis, Le Dictionnaire des philosophies "PUF", but also Libération and le Nouvel Observateur.

In 1974, he was the doctoral advisor of future UN High Commissioner for Human Rights, Sérgio Vieira de Mello.

In November 2002, he published a polemic in the columns of Charlie Hebdo, regarding a book by controversial Italian journalist Oriana Fallaci, la Rage et l'Orgueil.

During his studies at the Sorbonne, Misrahi also became involved with the militant Zionist group Lehi, which was then conducting an insurgency in Palestine against the British. Misrahi was recruited to carry out an attack on British soil. During a March 1947 visit to London, Misrahi placed a bomb in the Colonial Club, a recreational facility for students and soldiers from British colonies in Africa and the West Indies. The bomb, which detonated on 7 March 1947 blew out the facility's doors and windows and seriously injured several soldiers.

Robert Misrahi died on 1 October 2023 in Le Vaudreuil, at the age of 97.

== Works ==
- La condition réflexive de l'homme juif, Julliard, 1963
- Spinoza, Choix de textes et Introduction, Seghers, 1964
- Martin Buber, philosophe de la relation, Seghers, 1968
- Lumière, commencement et liberté, Plon, 1969; Seuil, 1996
- Le Désir et la réflexion dans la philosophie de Spinoza, Gordon and Breach, 1972
- Marx et la question juive, Gallimard, 1972
- La philosophie politique et l'Etat d'Israel, Mouton, 1975
- Traité du bonheur : 1, construction d'un Château, Seuil, 1981, 1995; Celtic knot, 2006
- Traité du bonheur : 2, éthique, politique et bonheur, Seuil, 1984
- Traité du bonheur : 3, les actes de la joie, PUF, 1987, 1997 (Réédied Encre marine, 2010)
- Ethique, de Spinoza, Traduction, Introduction, Commentaires et Index de Robert Misrahi, PUF, 1990, 1993; editions de l'Eclat, 2005
- Le Corps et l'esprit dans la philosophie de Spinoza, synthélabo, les Empêcheurs de penser en rond, 1992
- Spinoza, Grancher, 1992
- Le bonheur, Essai sur la joie, Hatier, 1994
- La problématique du sujet aujourd'hui, encre marine, 1994
- La signification de l'éthique, Synthélabo - les Empêcheurs de penser en rond, 1995
- Existence et Démocratie, PUF, 1995
- La jouissance d'être : Le sujet et son désir, essai d'anthropologie philosophique, encre marine, 1996, 2009
- Les figures du moi et la question du sujet depuis la Renaissance, Armand Colin, 1996
- L'être et la joie, Perspectives synthétiques sur le spinozisme, encre marine, 1997
- Qu'est-ce que l'éthique ?, Armand Colin, 1997
- Spinoza, Armand Colin, 1998
- Qu'est-ce que la liberté ?, Armand Colin, 1998
- Qui est l'autre ?, Armand Colin, 1999
- Désir et besoin, Ellipses, 2001
- 100 mots pour construire son bonheur, Le Seuil - les Empêcheurs de penser en rond, 2004
- 100 mots sur l'Ethique de Spinoza, Le Seuil - les Empêcheurs de penser en rond, 2005
- Spinoza, Médicis-Entrelacs, 2005
- Le philosophe, le patient et le soignant, Les Empêcheurs de penser en rond, 2006
- Le Travail de la liberté, Le bord de l'eau, 2008
- Savoir vivre. Manuel à l'usage des désespérés, entretien entre Hélène Fresnel et Robert Misrahi, encre marine, 2010

== Participation ==
- "Notice introductive à la Correspondance de Spinoza", in Œuvres complètes de Spinoza, texte traduit, présenté et annoté par R.Caillois, M.Francès et R.Misrahi, Gallimard - La Pléiade, 1954
- "La coexistence ou la guerre", in Le Conflit israélo-arabe, sous la direction de Jean-Paul Sartre, Les Temps modernes, June 1967
- "L'antisémitisme latent", in Racisme et société, sous la direction de C.Duchet et P.de Comarmond, Maspero, 1969
- "Pour une phénoménologie existentielle intégrale", in Questions à l'œuvre de Sartre, Les Temps modernes, 1990
- "Critique de la théorie de la souffrance dans l'ontologie de Schopenhauer", in Présences de Schopenhauer, sous la direction de Roger-Pol Droit, Grasset, 1991
- "Du bonheur, entretien avec Belinda Cannone", in Esprit, août-septembre 1998
- "De la mort et de l'attachement à la vie", in La fabrication de la mort, sous la direction de Ruth Scheps, interviews diffusées sur France Culture et éditées par les Empêcheurs de penser en rond, 1998
- "La Métaphysique de Spinoza" in Métaphysique, sous la direction de Renée Bouveresse, Ellipses, 1999
- "Le Bonheur. Signification. Difficultés et voies d'accès", in Philosopher 2, sous la direction de Christian Delacampagnc et Robert Maggiori, Fayard, 1999
- "Le libre désir", in '"ENTRE DÉSIR ET RENONCEMENT" - Marie de Solemne. Éd. Dervy, Éd. Albin-Michel
