= José Gaos =

Spanish philosopher (1900-1969)

José Gaos (26 December 1900, Gijón, Spain – 10 June 1969, Mexico City) was a Spanish philosopher who obtained political asylum in Mexico during the Spanish Civil War and became one of the most important Mexican philosophers of the 20th century. He was a member of the Madrid School.

== Biography ==
Gaos grew up in Valencia and Oviedo in Spain as the eldest of nine siblings, including the actress Lola Gaos and the poets Alejandro and Vicente Gaos. Gaos spent most of his childhood in the home of his maternal grandparents in Asturias. At age 15, he moved to join the rest of his family in Valencia. That same year, he was introduced to philosophy through a history of philosophy by Jaime Balmes. Balmes' writing on the radical historicism of philosophy inspired Gaos' later work. Gaos attended the University of Valencia, then transferred to the University of Madrid, where he earned his bachelor's degree and doctorate. His doctoral dissertation dealt with the problem of psychologism.

After university, Gaos became a philosophy professor in León, at the University of Zaragoza and, after 1933, at the University of Madrid. In 1938, during the Spanish Civil War (1936–1939), he was exiled due to his republican and socialist sympathies. He moved to Mexico and taught as professor at the National Autonomous University of Mexico/UNAM. He was influenced by neo-scholasticism, neo-Kantianism and Edmund Husserl's phenomenology, in addition to German philosophers like Martin Heidegger and Nicolai Hartmann and, first and foremost, by his teacher, the Spanish philosopher José Ortega y Gasset.

Gaos also was a prolific translator of German philosophy, contributing to the translation projects of the School of Madrid that had been set up by Ortega. Gaos translated to Spanish the books of philosophers such as: Martin Heidegger (the first Spanish translation of Being and Time), John Dewey, Søren Kierkegaard, G. W. F. Hegel, Max Scheler, Immanuel Kant, Johann Gottlieb Fichte and Edmund Husserl.

Gaos's Collected Works (Obras completas) are edited by the UNAM in Mexico City, where the Gaos-Archive is.

== Selected publications ==
- La filosofía de Maimónides (1940)
- El pensamiento hispanoamericano (1944)
- Dos exclusivas del hombre: la mano y el tiempo (1945)
- Antología del pensamiento en lengua española en la edad contemporánea (1945)
- Filosofía de la filosofía (1947)
- Método para resolver los problemas de nuestro tiempo (1950)
- Introducción a El ser y el tiempo de Martin Heidegger (1951)
- En torno a la filosofía mexicana (1952)
- Filosofía mexicana en nuestros días (1954)
- La filosofía en la universidad (1956)
- Ensayos sobre Ortega y Gasset (1957)
- Confesiones profesionales (1958)
- Discurso de filosofía (1959)
- Orígenes de la filosofía y su historia (1960)
- Filosofía contemporánea (1962)
- Historia de nuestra idea del mundo (1973)
- Filosofía de la técnica (2022), collection of Gaos' essays, ed. by María Antonia González Valerio and Nicole C. Karafyllis
