= 1902 in philosophy =

1902 in philosophy

== Events ==
- The 1902 Nobel Prize in Literature was awarded to Theodor Mommsen, "the greatest living master of the art of historical writing, with special reference to his monumental work, A history of Rome".

== Publications ==
- Pierre-Simon Laplace, A Philosophical Essay on Probabilities (English translation: 1902)
- William James, The Varieties of Religious Experience (1902)
- Benedetto Croce, Aesthetic as Science of Expression and General Linguistic (1902)
- Peter Kropotkin, Mutual Aid: A Factor of Evolution (1902)

== Births ==
- July 28 - Karl Popper (died 1994)
- December 28 - Mortimer J. Adler (died 2001)
