= Holism and Evolution =

1926 book by Jan Smuts

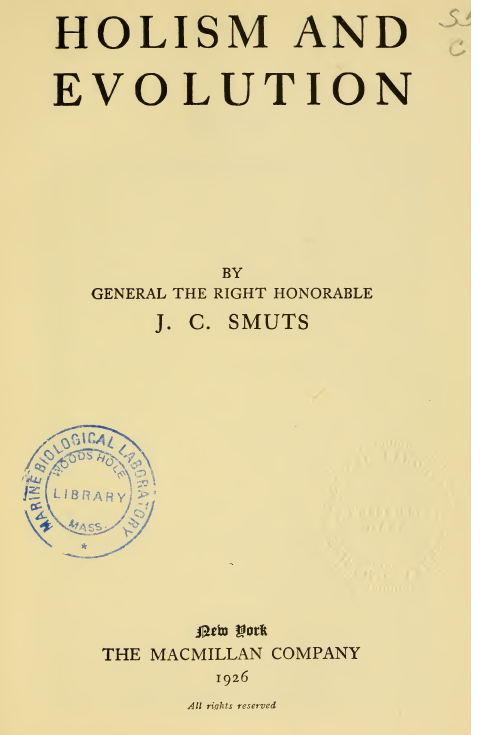
- Author: Jan Smuts
- Language: English
- Subject: Philosophy
- Publisher: Macmillan Inc.
- Publication date: 1926
- Publication place: South Africa

Holism and Evolution is a 1926 book by South African statesman Jan Smuts, in which he coined the word "holism", although Smuts' meaning differs from the modern concept of holism. Smuts defined holism as the "fundamental factor operative towards the creation of wholes in the universe."

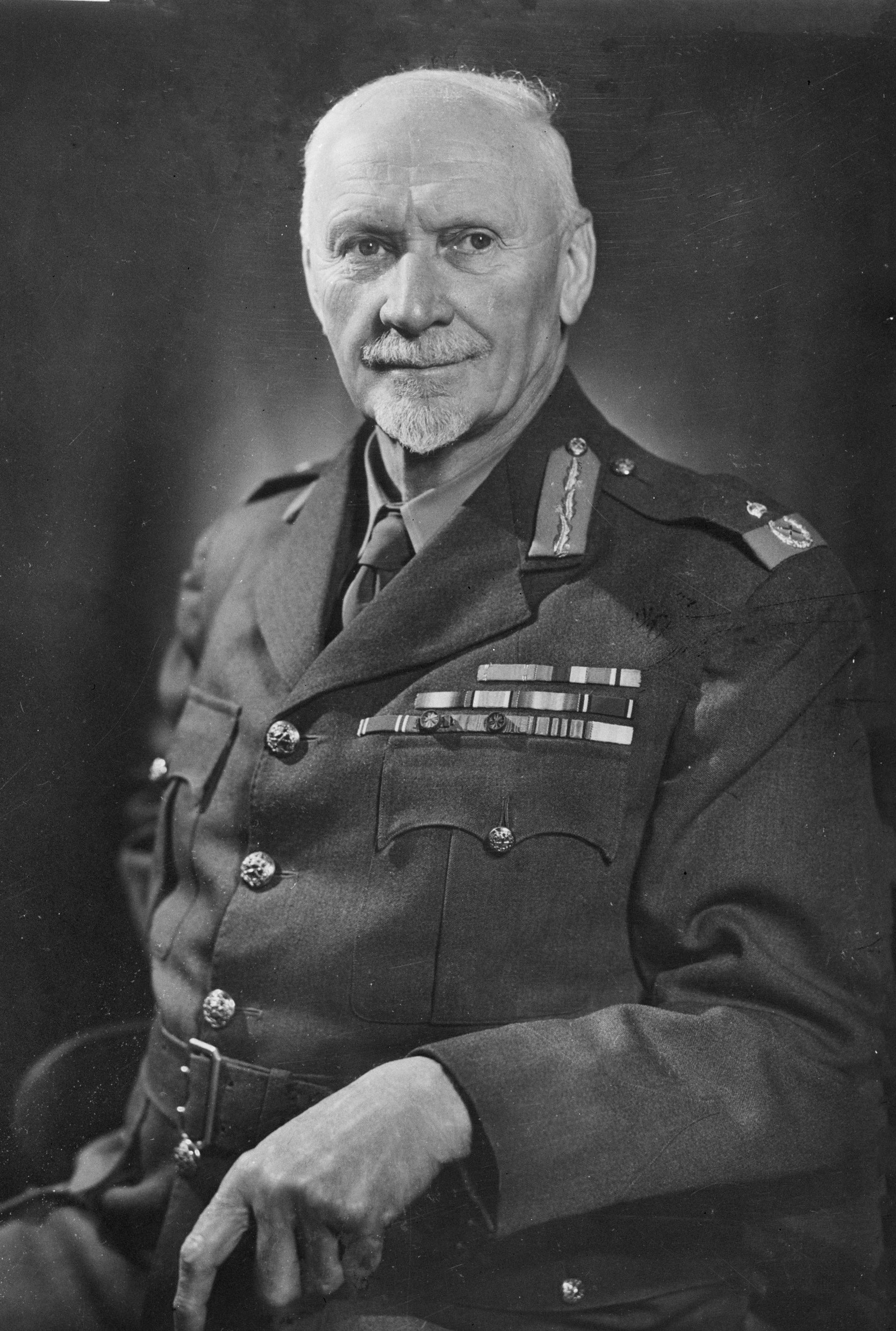
Smuts in 1947

The book was part of a broader trend of interest in holism in European and colonial academia during the early twentieth century. Smuts based his philosophy of holism on the thoughts behind his earlier book, Walt Whitman: A Study in the Evolution of Personality, written during his time at Cambridge in the early 1890s. The book describes a "process-orientated, hierarchical view of nature" and has been influential among criticisms of reductionism.

Smuts' formulation of holism has also been linked with his political-military activity, especially his aspiration to create a league of nations: "the unification of the four provinces in the Union of South Africa, the idea of the British Commonwealth of Nations, and, finally, the great whole resulting from the combination of the peoples of the earth were just a logical progression consistent with his philosophical tenets."

Smuts saw the League of Nations as a project that would unify white internationalists and pacify a forthcoming race war by establishing a mandate system, whereby whites would indirectly rule and segregate non-whites.

== Synopsis of Holism and Evolution ==
After identifying the need for reform in the fundamental concepts of matter, life, and mind (chapter 1), Smuts examines the reformed concepts (as of 1926) of space and time (chapter 2), matter (chapter 3), and biology (chapter 4), and concludes that the close approach to each other of the concepts of matter, life, and mind, and the partial overflow of each other's domains, imply that there is a fundamental principle (Holism) of which they are the progressive outcome. Chapters 5 and 6 provide the general concept, functions, and categories of holism; chapters 7 and 8 address holism with respect to Mechanism and Darwinism; chapters 9-11 make a start towards demonstrating the concepts and functions of holism for the metaphysical categories (mind, personality, ideals), and the book concludes with a chapter that argues for the universal ubiquity of holism and its place as a monistic ontology.

=== Structure ===
Wholes are composites which have an internal structure, function, or character, which clearly differentiate them from mechanical additions, aggregates, and constructions, such as science assumes on the mechanical hypothesis. The concept of structure is not confined to the physical domain (e.g. chemical, biological and artifacts); it also applies to the metaphysical domain (e.g. mental structures, properties, attributes, values, ideals, etc.)

=== Field ===
The field of a whole is not something different and additional to it, it is the continuation of the whole beyond its sensible contours of experience. The field characterizes a whole as a unified and synthesized event in the system of relativity that includes not only its present but also its past—and also its future potentialities. As such, the concept of field entails both activity and structure.

=== Variation ===
Darwin's theory of organic descent placed primary emphasis on the role of natural selection, but there would be nothing to select if not for variation. Variations that are the result of mutations in the biological sense and variations that are the result of individually acquired modifications in the personal sense are attributed by Smuts to holism; further, it was his opinion that because variations appear in complexes and not singly, evolution is more than the outcome of individual selections; it is holistic.

=== Regulation ===
The whole exhibits a discernible regulatory function as it relates to cooperation and coordination of the structure and activity of parts, and to the selection and deselection of variations. The result is a balanced correlation of organs and functions. The activities of the parts are directed to central ends: co-operation and unified action instead of the separate mechanical activities of the parts.

=== Creativity ===
It is the intermingling of fields that is creative or causal in nature. This is seen in basic matter, where if not for its dynamic structural creative character, matter could not have been the mother of the universe. This function, or factor of creativity, is even more marked in biology, where the protoplasm of the cell is vitally active in an ongoing process of creative change where parts are continually being destroyed and replaced by new protoplasm. With minds, the regulatory function of holism acquires consciousness and freedom, demonstrating a creative power of the most far-reaching character. Holism is not only creative but self-creative, and its final structures are far more holistic than its initial structures.

=== Causality ===
As relates to causality, Smuts makes reference to A. N. Whitehead, and indirectly Baruch Spinoza; the Whitehead premise is that organic mechanism is a fundamental process which realizes and actualizes individual syntheses or unities. Holism (the factor) exemplifies this same idea while emphasizing the holistic character of the process. The whole completely transforms the concept of causality: results are not directly a function of causes. The whole absorbs and integrates the cause into its own activity: results appear as the consequence of the activity of the whole.

=== The whole is greater than the sum of its parts ===
The fundamental holistic characters as a unity of parts which is so close and intense as to be more than the sum of its parts; which not only gives a particular conformation or structure to the parts, but so relates and determines them in their synthesis that their functions are altered; the synthesis affects and determines the parts, so that they function towards the whole; and the whole and the parts, therefore reciprocally influence and determine each other, and appear more or less to merge their individual characters: the whole is in the parts and the parts are in the whole, and this synthesis of whole and parts is reflected in the holistic character of the functions of the parts as well as of the whole.

=== Progressive grading of wholes ===
Smuts suggests "rough and provisional" summary of the progressive grading of wholes that comprise holism is as follows:

1. Material structure, e.g. a chemical compound
2. Functional structure in living bodies
3. Animals, which exhibit a degree of central control that is primarily implicit and unconscious
4. Personality, characterized as conscious central control
5. States and similar group organizations characterized by central control that involve many people
6. Holistic Ideals, or absolute Values, distinct from human personality, that are creative factors in the creation of a spiritual world, for example Truth, Beauty and Goodness.
