= Arturo Andrés Roig =

Argentine philosopher

- Born: July 16, 1922; Mendoza
- Died: April 30, 2012; Mendoza

Philosophical work
- Era: 20th-century philosophy
- Region: Western philosophy

Arturo Andrés Roig (16 July 1922 – 30 April 2012) was an Argentine philosopher.

== Biography ==
Born in Mendoza, he entered the Universidad Nacional de Cuyo, and graduated in 1949 with a degree in Education Sciences (Profesor de Enseñanza Secundaria, Normal y Especial en Filosofía). Roig continued his studies at the Sorbonne.

He returned to Argentina, and in 1955 he began teaching philosophy at the Universidad Nacional de Cuyo, with a special interest in local philosophers. This interest subsequently expanded to national and Latin American philosophers. Roig also studied German philosopher Karl Christian Friedrich Krause, and authored his first book on the panentheist thinker's influence in Argentina.

He is famous for being one of the best developed examples of Latin American Philosophy, and for his vast amount of scientific works, for which he has received widespread recognition and awards.

== Bibliography ==
- Los krausistas argentinos (1969)
- El espiritualismo argentino entre 1850 y 1900 (1972)
- Platón o la filosofía como libertad y espectativa (1972)
- Esquemas para una historia de la filosofía ecuatoriana (1977)
- Teoría y crítica del pensamiento latinoamericano (1981)
- Filosofía, universidad y filósofos en América Latina (1981)
- El pensamiento social de Juan Montalvo (1984)
- El Humanismo ecuatoriano de la segunda mitad del siglo XVIII (1984)
- Bolivarismo y filosofía latinoamericana (1984)
- Narrativa y cotidianidad (1984)
- El pensamiento latinoamericano del siglo XIX (1986)
- La utopía del Ecuador (1987)
- Pensamiento filosófico de Hernán Malo González (1989)
- Historia de las ideas, teoría del discurso y pensamiento latinoamericano (1991)
- Rostro y filosofía de América Latina (1993)
- El pensamiento latinoamericano y su aventura (1994)
- Ética del poder y moralidad de la protesta (1996)
- La universidad hacia la democracia (1998)

== Awards ==
Argentina

- Distinción General José de San Martín (1994)
- Profesor Honorario (1994) - Universidad Nacional del Comahue
- Doctor Honoris Causa (1996) - Universidad Nacional de Río Cuarto
- Premio Konex 1996: Ética

Cuba

- Visitante ilustre de la Universidad de las Villas (1993)

Ecuador

- Condecoración al mérito cultural (1983)
- Orden Nacional Honorato Vázquez (1992)
- Profesor Honorario (1994) - Universidad Andina Simón Bolívar

Nicaragua

- Doctor Honoris Causa (1994) - Universidad Autónoma de Managua
