= A Philosophical Essay on Probabilities =

- Author: Pierre-Simon Laplace
- Original title: Essai philosophique sur les probabilités
- Translator: Frederick Wilson Truscott and Frederick Lincoln Emory
- Subject: Theory of probability
- Publisher: John Wiley & Son, Chapman & Hall
- Original text: Essai philosophique sur les probabilités at French Wikisource
- Translation: A Philosophical Essay on Probabilities at Wikisource
- Website: https://bayes.wustl.edu/Manual/laplace_A_philosophical_essay_on_probabilities.pdf

A Philosophical Essay on Probabilities is a work by Pierre-Simon Laplace on the mathematical theory of probability. The book consists of two parts, the first with five chapters and the second with thirteen.

== Table of Contents ==
- Part I - A Philosophical Essay on Probabilities
1. Introduction
2. Concerning Probability
3. General Principles of the Calculus of Probability
4. Concerning Hope
5. Analytical Methods of the Calculus of Probability
- Part II - Application of the Calculus of Probabilities
1. Games of Chance
2. Concerning the Unknown Inequalities which may Exist among Chances Supposed to be Equal
3. Concerning the Laws of Probability which result from the Indefinite Multiplication of Events
4. Application of the Calculus of Probabilities to Natural Philosophy
5. Application of the Calculus of Probabilities to the Moral Sciences
6. Concerning the Probability of Testimonies
7. Concerning the Selections and Deliberations of Assemblies
8. Concerning the Probability of the Judgements of Tribunals
9. Concerning Tables of Mortality, and the Mean Durations of Life, Marriage and Some Assemblies
10. Concerning the Benefits of Institutions which Depend on the Probability of Events
11. Concerning Illusions in the Estimation of Probabilities
12. Concerning the Various Means of Approaching Certainty
13. Historical Note of the Calculus of Probabilities to 1816
