= The Revolt of the Masses =

1929 book by José Ortega y Gasset

- Author: José Ortega y Gasset
- Original title: La rebelión de las masas
- Publication date: 1929

The Revolt of the Masses (Spanish: La rebelión de las masas, pronounced [la reβeˈljon de las ˈmasas]) is a book by José Ortega y Gasset. It was first published as a series of articles in the newspaper El Sol in 1929, and as a book in 1930; the English translation, first published two years later, was authorized by Ortega. While this published translation notes that the translator asked to remain anonymous, more recent editions record that its US copyright was renewed in 1960 by a Teresa Carey, and the US Copyright Office's published list of US copyright renewals for January 1960 gives the translator as J. R. Carey.

A second translation was published in 1985 by the University of Notre Dame Press in association with W. W. Norton & Co. This translation was completed by Anthony Kerrigan (translator) and Kenneth Moore (editor). An introduction was written by novelist Saul Bellow.

== Summary ==
In this work, Ortega traces the genesis of the "mass-man" and analyzes his constitution, en route to describing the rise to power and action of the masses in society. Ortega is throughout quite critical of both the masses and the mass-men of which they are made up, contrasting "noble life and common life" and excoriating the barbarism and primitivism he sees in the mass-man.

He does not, however, refer to specific social classes, as has been so commonly misunderstood in the English-speaking world. Ortega states that the mass-man could be from any social background, but his specific target is the bourgeois educated man, the señorito satisfecho (satisfied young man, or Mr. Satisfied), the specialist who believes he has it all and extends the command he has of his subject to others, contemptuous of his ignorance in all of them.

Ortega's summary of what he attempted in the book exemplifies this quite well, while simultaneously providing the author's own views on his work: "In this essay an attempt has been made to sketch a certain type of European, mainly by analyzing his behaviour as regards the very civilization into which he was born". This had to be done because that individual "does not represent a new civilisation struggling with a previous one, but a mere negation ..."

== Notable quotes ==
As they say in the United States: "to be different is to be indecent." The mass crushes beneath it everything that is different, everything that is excellent, individual, qualified and select. Anybody who is not like everybody, who does not think like everybody, runs the risk of being eliminated. And it is clear, of course, that this "everybody" is not "everybody." "Everybody" was normally the complex unity of the mass and the divergent, specialized minorities. Nowadays, "everybody" is the mass alone. Here we have the formidable fact of our times, described without any concealment of the brutality of its features.

— Chapter 1, "The Coming of the Masses"

The Fascist and Syndicalist species were characterized by the first appearance of a type of man who "did not care to give reasons or even to be right", but who was simply resolved to impose his opinions. That was the novelty: the right not to be right, not to be reasonable: "the reason of unreason."

— Chapter 8, "Why the Masses Intervene in Everything and Why They Always Intervene Violently"

== See also ==
- Ortega hypothesis
- Technocracy
- Mass culture
