= José Ortega y Gasset =

Spanish philosopher and essayist (1883–1955)

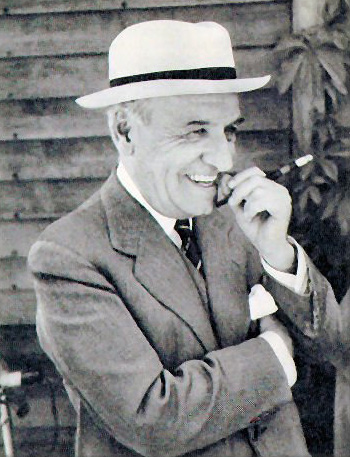
- Ortega y Gasset in 1948
- Born: 9 May 1883; Madrid, Kingdom of Spain
- Died: 18 October 1955 (aged 72); Madrid, Spanish State

Education
- Education: University of Deusto; Complutense University of Madrid (PhD, 1904)
- Academic advisors: Hermann Cohen; Paul Natorp

Philosophical work
- Era: 20th-century philosophy
- Region: Western philosophy
- School: Continental philosophy Perspectivism; Pragmatism; Vitalism; Historism; Existentialism; Existential phenomenology Lebensphilosophie; Neo-Kantianism (early); Madrid School; Liberalism; Noucentisme
- Institutions: Complutense University of Madrid
- Doctoral students: Xavier Zubiri
- Main interests: History, reason, politics
- Notable ideas: Vital reason (ratiovitalism); Historical reason "I am I and my circumstance" Ortega hypothesis

José Ortega y Gasset (/ɔːrˈteɪɡə/ or-TAY-gə; Spanish: [xoˈse oɾˈteɣa j ɣaˈset]; 9 May 1883 – 18 October 1955) was a Spanish philosopher and essayist. He worked during the first half of the 20th century while Spain oscillated between monarchy, republicanism and dictatorship. His philosophy has been characterized as a "philosophy of life" (Lebensphilosophie) that comprised "a long-hidden beginning in a pragmatist metaphysics" inspired by William James and with a general method from a realist phenomenology imitating Edmund Husserl, which served both his proto-existentialism (prior to Martin Heidegger's), and his realist historicism, which has been compared to both Wilhelm Dilthey and Benedetto Croce.

== Biography ==
José Ortega y Gasset was born 9 May 1883 in Madrid. His father was director of the newspaper El Imparcial, which belonged to the family of his mother, Dolores Gasset. The family was definitively of Spain's end-of-the-century liberal and educated bourgeoisie. The liberal tradition and journalistic engagement of his family had a profound influence in Ortega y Gasset's activism in politics.

Ortega was first schooled by the Jesuit priests of St. Stanislaus Kostka College, Málaga, Málaga (1891–1897). He attended the University of Deusto, Bilbao (1897–98) and the Faculty of Philosophy and Letters at the Central University of Madrid (now Complutense University of Madrid) (1898–1904), receiving a doctorate in Philosophy. From 1905 to 1907, he continued his studies in Germany at Leipzig, Nuremberg, Cologne, Berlin and, above all Marburg. At Marburg, he was influenced by the neo-Kantianism of Hermann Cohen and Paul Natorp, among others.

On his return to Spain in 1908, he was appointed professor of Philosophy, Logic and Ethics at the Escuela Superior del Magisterio de Madrid. In 1910, he married Rosa Spottorno Topete, a Spanish translator and feminist, and was named full professor of Metaphysics at Complutense University of Madrid, a vacant seat previously held by Nicolás Salmerón.

In 1917 he became a contributor to the newspaper El Sol, where he published, as a series of essays, his two principal works: España invertebrada (Invertebrate Spain) and La rebelión de las masas (The Revolt of the Masses). The latter made him internationally famous. He founded the Revista de Occidente in 1923, remaining its director until 1936. This publication promoted translation of (and commentary upon) the most important figures and tendencies in philosophy, including Oswald Spengler, Johan Huizinga, Edmund Husserl, Georg Simmel, Jakob von Uexküll, Heinz Heimsoeth, Franz Brentano, Hans Driesch, Ernst Müller, Alexander Pfänder, and Bertrand Russell.

Elected deputy for the Province of León in the constituent assembly of the Second Spanish Republic, he was the leader of a parliamentary group of intellectuals known as Agrupación al Servicio de la República ("The Grouping at the Service of the Republic"), which supported the platform of Socialist Republican candidates, but he soon abandoned politics, disappointed.

Leaving Spain at the outbreak of the Civil War, he spent years of exile in Buenos Aires, Argentina until moving back to Europe in 1942. He settled in Portugal by mid-1945 and slowly began to make short visits to Spain. In 1948 he returned to Madrid, where he founded the Institute of Humanities, at which he lectured. Upon his return to Spain, he often privately expressed his hostility to the Franco regime, stating that the government did not deserve anyone's confidence and that his beliefs were "incompatible with Franco."

== Philosophy ==
=== Liberalism ===
The Revolt of the Masses (1929) is Ortega's best known work. In this book he defends the values of meritocratic liberalism reminiscent of John Stuart Mill against attacks from both communists and right-wing populists. Ortega likewise shares Mill's fears of the "tyranny of the majority" and the "collective mediocrity" of the masses, which he believes threaten individuality, free thought, and protections for minorities. Ortega characterized liberalism as a politics of "magnanimity."

Ortega's rejection of the Spanish Conservative Party under Antonio Cánovas del Castillo and his successors was unequivocal, as was his distrust of the Spanish monarchy and Catholic Church. Yet, Ortega's political thought has been characterized as anti-democratic and conservative, and his work The Revolt of the Masses is widely regarded as a conservative classic.

Ortega wrote about education, focusing broadly on the overarching goals of learning, on university reform, types of pedagogy, and the need to empower individuals to seek self-improvement throughout their lives. His philosophy of education balanced progressive and conservative elements. Central to his thought was an advocacy of the Socratic teaching methods that were central to his vision.

In a manner similar to Mill, Ortega was open-minded toward certain socialists and non-Marxist forms of socialism, and even complimented Pablo Iglesias Posse as a "lay saint". Under the influence of German social democrats, such as Paul Natorp and Hermann Cohen, he adopted a communitarian ontology and could be critical of capitalism, particularly the laissez-faire variant, declaring that "nineteenth-century capitalism has demoralized humanity" and that it had "impoverished the ethical consciousness of man."

=== "Yo soy yo y mi circunstancia" ===
For Ortega y Gasset, philosophy has a critical duty to lay siege to beliefs in order to promote new ideas and to explain reality. To accomplish such tasks, the philosopher must—as Husserl proposed—leave behind prejudices and previously existing beliefs, and investigate the essential reality of the universe. Ortega y Gasset proposes that philosophy must overcome the limitations of both idealism (in which reality centers around the ego) and ancient-medieval realism (in which reality is outside the subject) to focus on the only truthful reality: "my life"—the life of each individual. He suggests that there is no "me" without things, and things are nothing without me: "I" (human being) cannot be detached from "my circumstance" (world). This led Ortega y Gasset to pronounce his famous maxim "Yo soy yo y mi circunstancia" ("I am me and my circumstance") (Meditaciones del Quijote, 1914) which he always put at the core of his philosophy.

For Ortega y Gasset, as for Husserl, the Cartesian 'cogito ergo sum' is insufficient to explain reality. Therefore, the Spanish philosopher proposes a system wherein the basic or "radical" reality is "my life" (the first yo), which consists of "I" (the second yo) and "my circumstance" (mi circunstancia). This circunstancia is oppressive; therefore, there is a continual dialectical interaction between the person and his or her circumstances and, as a result, life is a drama that exists between necessity and freedom.

In this sense Ortega y Gasset wrote that life is at the same time fate and freedom, and that freedom "is being free inside of a given fate. Fate gives us an inexorable repertory of determinate possibilities, that is, it gives us different destinies. We accept fate and within it we choose one destiny." In this tied down fate we must therefore be active, decide and create a "project of life"—thus not be like those who live a conventional life of customs and given structures who prefer an unconcerned and imperturbable life because they are afraid of the duty of choosing a project.

=== Ratiovitalism ===
With a philosophical system that centered around life, Ortega y Gasset also stepped out of Descartes' cogito ergo sum and asserted "I live therefore I think". This stood at the root of his Kantian-inspired perspectivism, which he developed by adding a non-relativistic character in which absolute truth does exist and would be obtained by the sum of all perspectives of all lives, since for each human being life takes a concrete form and life itself is a true radical reality from which any philosophical system must derive. In this sense, Ortega coined the terms "vital reason" (Spanish: razón vital, "reason with life as its foundation") to refer to a new type of reason that constantly defends the life from which it has surged and "ratiovitalism" (Spanish: raciovitalismo), a theory that based knowledge in the radical reality of life, one of whose essential components is reason itself. This system of thought, which he introduces in History as System, escaped from Nietzsche's vitalism in which life responded to impulses; for Ortega, reason is crucial to create and develop the above-mentioned project of life.

=== Historical reason ===
For Ortega y Gasset, vital reason is also "historical reason", for individuals and societies are not detached from their past. In order to understand a reality we must understand, as Dilthey pointed out, its history.

== Influence ==
Ortega y Gasset's influence was considerable, not only because many sympathized with his philosophical writings, but also because those writings did not require that the reader be well-versed in technical philosophy. Among those strongly influenced by Ortega y Gasset were Luis Buñuel, Manuel García Morente, Joaquín Xirau, Xavier Zubiri, Ignacio Ellacuría, Emilio Komar, José Gaos, Luis Recasens, Manuel Granell, Francisco Ayala, María Zambrano, Agustín Basave, Máximo Etchecopar, Pedro Laín Entralgo, José Luis López-Aranguren, Julián Marías, John Lukacs, Pierre Bourdieu, Paulino Garagorri, Vicente Ferreira da Silva, Vilém Flusser and Félix Martí Ibáñez. The Ortega hypothesis, based on a quote in The Revolt of the Masses, states that average or mediocre scientists contribute substantially to the advancement of science.

German grape breeder Hans Breider named the grape variety Ortega in his honor. The American philosopher Graham Harman has recognized Ortega y Gasset as a source of inspiration for his own object-oriented ontology. La rebelión de las masas (The Revolt of the Masses) has been translated into English twice. The first, in 1932, is by a translator who wanted to remain anonymous, generally accepted to be J. R. Carey.

The second translation was published by the University of Notre Dame Press in 1985, in association with W.W. Norton & Co. This translation was by Anthony Kerrigan (translator) and Kenneth Moore (editor), with an introduction by Saul Bellow. Mildred Adams is the translator (into English) of the main body of Ortega's work, including Invertebrate Spain, Man and Crisis, What is Philosophy?, Some Lessons in Metaphysics, The Idea of Principle in Leibniz and the Evolution of Deductive Theory, and An Interpretation of Universal History. In Madrid, a street has been named after him, Calle José Ortega y Gasset.

=== Madrid School ===
The Madrid School (also School of Madrid; Spanish: Escuela de Madrid) was a group of philosophers, the members of which were students of Ortega y Gasset, who share an intellectual tradition of arguing against naturalism and positivism. Members included José Gaos, Julián Marías, Xavier Zubiri and María Zambrano.

=== Influence on the Generation of '27 ===
Ortega y Gasset had considerable influence on writers of the Generation of '27, a group of poets that arose in Spanish literature in the 1920s.

== Works ==
Much of Ortega y Gasset's work consists of course lectures published years after the fact, often posthumously. This list attempts to list works in chronological order by when they were written, rather than when they were published.

- Meditaciones del Quijote (Meditations on Quixote, 1914)
- Vieja y nueva política (Old and new politics, 1914)
- Investigaciones psicológicas (Psychological investigations, course given 1915–16 and published in 1982)
- Personas, obras, cosas (People, works, things, articles and essays written 1904–1912: "Renan", "Adán en el Paraíso" – "Adam in Paradise", "La pedagogía social como programa político" – "Pedagogy as a political program", "Problemas culturales" – "Cultural problems", etc., published 1916)
- El Espectador (The Spectator, 8 volumes published 1916–1934)
- España invertebrada (Invertebrate Spain, 1921)
- El tema de nuestro tiempo (The Modern Theme, 1923)
- Las Atlántidas (The Atlantises, 1924)
- La deshumanización del arte e Ideas sobre la novela (The dehumanization of art and Ideas about the novel, 1925)
- Espíritu de la letra (The spirit of the letter 1927)
- Mirabeau o el político (Mirabeau or the politician, 1928–1929)
- ¿Qué es filosofía? (What is philosophy? 1928–1929, course published posthumously in 1957)
- Kant (1929–31)
- ¿Qué es conocimiento? (What is knowledge? Published in 1984, covering three courses taught in 1929, 1930, and 1931, entitled, respectively: "Vida como ejecución (El ser ejecutivo)" – "Life as execution (The executive being)", "Sobre la realidad radical" – "On radical reality" and "¿Qué es la vida?" – "What is Life?")
- La rebelión de las masas (The Revolt of the Masses, 1930)
- Rectificación de la República; La redención de las provincias y la decencia nacional (Rectification of the Republic: Redemption of the provinces and national decency, 1931)
- Goethe desde dentro (Goethe from within, 1932)
- Unas lecciones de metafísica (Some lessons in metaphysics, course given 1932–33, published 1966)
- En torno a Galileo (About Galileo, course given 1933–34; portions were published in 1942 under the title "Esquema de las crisis" – "Outline of crises"; Mildred Adams's translation was published in 1958 as Man and Crisis.)
- Prólogo para alemanes (Prologue for Germans, prologue to the third German edition of El tema de nuestro tiempo. Ortega himself prevented its publication "because of the events of Munich in 1934". It was finally published, in Spanish, in 1958.)
- History as a System (First published in English in 1935. the Spanish version, Historia como sistema, 1941, adds an essay "El Imperio romano" – "The Roman Empire").
- Ensimismamiento y alteración. Meditación de la técnica. (Self-absorption and alteration. Meditation on the technique, 1939)
- Ideas y creencias (Ideas and beliefs: on historical reason, a course taught in 1940 Buenos Aires, published 1979 along with Sobre la razón histórica)
- Estudios sobre el amor (On Love: Aspects of a single theme)), 1940)
- Teoría de Andalucía y otros ensayos – Guillermo Dilthey y la idea de vida (The theory of Andalucia and other essays: Wilhelm Dilthey and the idea of life, 1942)
- Sobre la razón histórica (On historical reason, course given in Lisbon, 1944, published 1979 along with Ideas y Creencias)
- Prólogo a un Tratado de Montería (Preface to a treatise on the Hunt [separately published as Meditations on the Hunt], created as preface to a book on the hunt by Count Ybes published 1944)
- Idea del teatro. Una abreviatura (The idea of theatre. An abbreviated version, lecture given in Lisbon April 1946, and in Madrid, May 1946; published in 1958, La Revista Nacional de educación num. 62 contained the version given in Madrid.)
- La Idea de principio en Leibniz y la evolución de la teoría deductiva (The Idea of principle in Leibniz and the evolution of deductive theory, 1947, published 1958)
- Una interpretación de la historia universal. En torno a Toynbee (An interpretation of universal history. On Toynbee, 1948, published in 1960)
- Meditación de Europa (Meditation on Europe), lecture given in Berlin in 1949 with the Latin-language title De Europa meditatio quaedam. Published 1960 together with other previously unpublished works.
- El hombre y la gente (Man and people, course given 1949–1950 at the Institute of the Humanities, published 1957; Willard Trask's translation as Man and People published 1957; Partisan Review published parts of this translation in 1952)
- Papeles sobre Velázquez y Goya (Papers on Velázquez and Goya, 1950)
- Pasado y porvenir para el hombre actual (Past and future for present-day man, published 1962, brings together a series of lectures given in Germany, Switzerland, and England in the period 1951–1954, published together with a commentary on Plato's Symposium.)
- Goya (1958)
- Velázquez (1959)
- Origen y epílogo de la filosofía (Origin and epilogue of philosophy, 1960),
- La caza y los toros (Hunting and bulls, 1960)
- Meditations on hunting (1972, 1995) translated into English by Howard B. Westcott. Original art by Eldridge Hardie. Wilderness Adventure Press. ISBN 1885106181

Books translated into English

- The Revolt of the Masses, 1929
- Invertebrate Spain
- Man and Crisis
- What is Knowledge?
- What is Philosophy?, 1964
- Some Lessons in Metaphysics, 1971
- The Idea of Principle in Leibniz and the Evolution of Deductive Theory, 1971
- An Interpretation of Universal History
- The Dehumanization of Art and Other Essays on Art, Culture, and Literature, 1925, Princeton 2019
- On Love: Aspects of a Single Theme, 1957, 2012
- History as a System and Other Essays Toward a Philosophy of History, 1962
- Man and Crisis, 1962 (Norton Library)
- Man and People, 1963 (Norton Library)
- Meditations on Hunting, 1972
- The Origin of Philosophy, 1968
- Psychological Investigations, 1987
- Historical Reason, 1986
- Mission of the University, 2014 (International Library of Sociology)

== See also ==
- The Revolt of the Masses
- Nicolás Gómez Dávila
- Criticism of democracy
- Aristocracy
