= Akira Yamada =

Japanese philosopher and scholar (1922–2008)

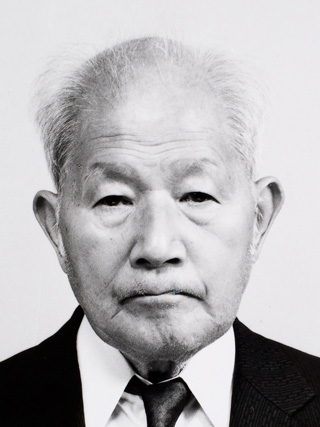
Portrait of Akira Yamada, published by the Japan Academy

Akira Yamada (山田 晶, Yamada Akira; 7 March 1922 – 29 February 2008) was a Japanese scholar and philosopher of the West European Medieval philosophy. He was member of the Japan Academy since 1998.

== Biography ==
Born in Suwa city, Nagano prefecture. Yamada graduated from the Nagano prefecture Suwa junior High-school, and from the 8th High-school. Yamada graduated from the Kyoto Imperial University, Philosophy section of the Department of Literature in September, 1944.

- 1951, Instructor of the Osaka City University, Department of Literature
- 1955, Assistant professor of the Osaka City University
- 1957-, Studied at Collegium Angelicum, Vatican City, Italy
- 1965, Assistant professor of the Kyoto University, Department of Literature
- 1968, Professor of the Kyoto University (September, 1968)
- 1976, Director of Department of Literature in the Kyoto University
- 1980-1986, Chairman of the Society of Medieval Philosophy
- 1985, Professor emeritus of the Kyoto University
- 1985–1990, Professor of the Nanzan University, Department of Literature
- 1990–1997, Lecturer of the Nanzan University
- 1998, Member of the Japan Academy

Yamada won the Osaragi Jirou Award by Lectures on Augustinus in 1987. He wrote many studies books on Augustine, Thomas Aquinas et al., and edited and translated their books.

Yamada died of malignant lymphoma at the age of eighty-five, at Kamakura, Kanagawa Prefecture, on 29 February 2008.

== Works ==
The following books are all in Japanese.

- The Fundamental Problems of Augustinus - 1st Book of Studies on Medieval Philosophy, (1977), Sōbunsha, ISBN 978-4423170052 (2003)
- The Studies on Thomas Aquinas' ESSE - 2nd Book of Studies on Medieval Philosophy, (1978), Sōbunsha, ISBN 978-4423300381 (1978)
- The One Who is the One Existing - 3rd Book of Studies on Medieval Philosophy, (1979), Sōbunsha,
- The Studies on Thomas Aquinas' RES - 4th Book of Studies on Medieval Philosophy, (1986), Sōbunsha, ISBN 978-4423300404 (1986)
- Lectures on Augustinus, (1986), Shinchi shobou, ISBN 4-88018-118-8
- The Christology of Thomas Aquinas, (1999), Soubunsha, ISBN 4-423-30106-7
- Lectures on Medieval Philosophy, 5 Volumes, (2021-2022), Chisenshokan, (edited by Shinsuke Kawazoe et al.)
- Lectures on Ethics, 5 Volumes, (2024- ), Chisenshokan, (edited by Yoshinobu Kohama)
- Analogia and God Tetsugaku-shobō, 1989, (as Representative editor)

=== Translation and Others ===
- Thomas Aquinas Summa Thelogiae (39 volumes), Sōbunsha, 1965 -2003

Yamada translated and commented 6 books in this collection (in Part 1, Vol.3 to Part 3, Vol.28).

- The World Fine Books, 14th vol. - Augustinus - Confession, ed. et translation, (1968), Chuo-Koronsha, ISBN 4-12-400094-4
- The World Fine Books, 2nd season, 5th vol. - Thomas Aquinas - Summa Thelogica, ed. et translation, (1975), Chuou-Kouronsha, ISBN 4-12-400094-4
- Histoire de la philosophie. Idées. Doctrines (8 volumes), 1972-1973, by François Châtelet

Yamada translated Tome 2 - Philosophie Médiévale, Hakusuisha, 1976, ISBN 4560023689

- Piety of Christian, The Papers Dedicated to Master (Sir) Tōru Ingu in Commemoration of the 77th Birthday, co-editor, Yorudansha, 1989, ISBN 4842800143

=== Poetry anthology and Others ===
- Yamada Akira: Poem Anthology, (?, circa 1980), Oka-shobō, (private edition)
- Poem Anthology - The Songs of Morning and Evening, (1986), Shinchi shobō
- The Mother in the Memory - Remembrance of Nihi Yamada, (1989), Shinchi shobō, (Editor and writer)
