= Kurt Rudolf Fischer =

Kurt Rudolf Fischer (February 26, 1922 – March 22, 2014) was a Jewish-Austrian philosopher who emigrated to Brno, Czechoslovakia, in 1938 and to Shanghai in 1940. He was born in Vienna.

He became Chinese boxing champion and started studying philosophy at the University of California, Berkeley after World War II, where he made friends with Paul Feyerabend. From 1967 to 1980 he was professor at Millersville University of Pennsylvania in Millersville, Pennsylvania. From 1979 - 2008 he was honorary professor at the University of Vienna.

Fischer was awarded the gold medal for Services to the City of Vienna in 2000 and in 2001. He also received the Austrian Cross of Honour for Science and Art, 1st class. He died in Lancaster, Pennsylvania on March 22, 2014, at the age of 92.

== Publications ==
- Contemporary European Philosophers, Berkeley, 2nd ed. 1968, 3d. 3d ed.1972
- Philosophie aus Wien, Wien-Salzburg 1991
- Österreichische Philosophie von Brentano bis Wittgenstein. Ein Lesebuch. UTB 2086, Wien 1999

== Festschrift ==
- Philosophie, Psychoanalyse, Emigration : Festschrift für Kurt Rudolf Fischer zum 70. Geburtstag / editors: Peter Muhr, Paul Feyerabend, Cornelia Wegeler (1992)
