= 1898 in philosophy =

1898 in philosophy

== Events ==
- The "Generation of '98" writers and thinkers are active in Spain.

== Publications ==
- Ebenezer Howard, To-Morrow: A Peaceful Path to Real Reform
- Alfred Henry Lloyd, Dynamic Idealism
- Simon Newcomb, "The Philosophy of Hyperspace", Bulletin of the American Mathematical Society

== Births ==
- May 19 - Julius Evola (died 1974)
- November 9 - Owen Barfield (died 1997)
- November 14 - Benjamin Fondane (died 1944)
- December 4 - Xavier Zubiri (died 1983)
