= 1929 in philosophy =

1929 in philosophy

== Events ==
- Cassirer–Heidegger debate

== Publications ==
- Alfred North Whitehead, Process and Reality (1929)
- Bertrand Russell, Marriage and Morals (1929)
- Virginia Woolf, A Room of One's Own (1929)
- José Ortega y Gasset, The Revolt of the Masses (1929)
- Julian Huxley and G. P. Wells, The Science of Life (1929)
- I. A. Richards, Practical Criticism (1929)
- Martin Heidegger, Kant and the Problem of Metaphysics (1929)

== Births ==
- January 3 – Gordon Moore (died 2023)
- January 12 – Jaakko Hintikka (died 2015)
- January 12 – Alasdair MacIntyre
- January 19 – Nel Noddings (died 2022)
- March 17 – Peter L. Berger (died 2017)
- April 1 – Milan Kundera (died 2023)
- April 23 – George Steiner (died 2020)
- May 16 – Adrienne Rich (died 2012)
- May 29 – Harry Frankfurt (died 2023)
- June 10 – E. O. Wilson (died 2021)
- June 18 – Jürgen Habermas (died 2026)
- July 27 – Jean Baudrillard (died 2007)
- September 21 – Bernard Williams (died 2003)
- October 4 – Judith Jarvis Thomson (died 2020)
- October 15 – Hubert Dreyfus (died 2017)

== Deaths ==
- January 19 – Liang Qichao (born 1873)
- August 3 – Thorstein Veblen (born 1857)
- December 10 – Franz Rosenzweig (born 1886)
