= 1932 in philosophy =

1932 in philosophy

== Publications ==
- Henri Bergson, The Two Sources of Morality and Religion (1932)
- George Herbert Mead, The Philosophy of the Present (1932)
- David Eder, The Myth of Progress (1932)
- Jacques Maritain, The Degrees of Knowledge (1932)
- Karl Jaspers, Philosophy (1932)
- Jean Piaget, The Moral Judgment of the Child (1932)

=== Philosophical literature ===
- Hermann Broch, The Sleepwalkers (1932)

== Births ==
- January 4 - Paul Virilio (died 2018)
- January 5 - Umberto Eco (died 2016)
- July 31 - John Searle
- September 10 - David Gauthier (died 2023)
- October 11 - Dana Scott
- November 15 - Alvin Plantinga
