= 1900 in philosophy =

1900 in philosophy

== Events ==
- American Philosophical Association founded.

== Publications ==
- Edmund Husserl, Logical Investigations (1900)
- Nitobe Inazō, Bushido: The Soul of Japan (1900)
- George Herbert Mead, Suggestions Towards a Theory of the Philosophical Disciplines (1900)

== Births ==
- January 15 - R. B. Braithwaite (died 1990)
- February 11 - Hans-Georg Gadamer (died 2002)
- February 27 - Keiji Nishitani (died 1990)
- March 23 - Erich Fromm (died 1980)
- April 25 - Wolfgang Pauli (died 1958)
- June 15 - Gotthard Günther (died 1984)
- June 29 - Antoine de Saint-Exupéry (died 1944)
- August 19 - Gilbert Ryle (died 1976)
- November 3 - Leo Löwenthal (died 1993)

== Deaths ==
- August 25 - Friedrich Nietzsche (born 1844)
- October 28 - Max Müller (born 1823)
