= 1899 in philosophy =

1899 in philosophy

== Publications ==
- Sigmund Freud, The Interpretation of Dreams (1899, dated 1900)
- Thorstein Veblen, The Theory of the Leisure Class (1899)
- Heinrich Rickert, Kulturwissenschaft und Naturwissenschaft (1899)

=== Philosophical literature ===
- Joseph Conrad, Heart of Darkness (1899)

== Births ==
- May 8 - Friedrich Hayek (died 1992)
- September 20 - Leo Strauss (died 1973)
