= 1931 in philosophy =

1931 in philosophy was a critical year for the publication of a number of important works.

== Publications ==
- Kurt Gödel, On Formally Undecidable Propositions of Principia Mathematica and Related Systems (1931)

== Births ==
- April 16 - Leo Bersani (died 2022)
- May 19 - Alfred Schmidt (died 2012)
- June 3 - John Norman
- August 4 - Paul Avrich (died 2006)
- August 8 - Roger Penrose
- September 3 - Samir Amin (died 2018)
- September 29 - Sydney Shoemaker (died 2022)
- October 4 - Richard Rorty (died 2007)
- November 5 - Charles Taylor
- December 11 - Ronald Dworkin (died 2013)
- December 28 - Guy Debord (died 1994)

== Deaths ==
- April 10 - Kahlil Gibran (born 1883)
- April 26 - George Herbert Mead (born 1863)
