= 1906 in philosophy =

1906 in philosophy

== Births ==
- February 22 - Humayun Kabir (died 1969)
- April 28 - Kurt Gödel (died 1978)
- October 14 - Hannah Arendt (died 1975)

== Deaths ==
- January 25 - Émile Boutmy (born 1835)
