= 1912 in philosophy =

The following is a list of events that occurred in 1912 in philosophy.

== Events ==
- Department of Philosophy, King's College London was established.

== Publications ==
- Bertrand Russell, The Problems of Philosophy

== Births ==
- June 28 - Carl Friedrich von Weizsäcker, German physicist and philosopher (died 2007)

== Deaths ==
- March 29 - Victoria, Lady Welby, English philosopher of language
