= Paul Barth (sociologist) =

German sociologist (1858–1922)

Ernst Emil Paul Barth (born on 1 August 1858 in Baruthe near Oels, Silesia; died on 30 September 1922 in Leipzig), known simply as Paul Barth, was a German sociologist and philosopher.

== Biography ==
After studying history, philology and philosophy in Breslau and Leipzig, Barth worked as a grammar school teacher from 1882-88 before becoming a private lecturer in philosophy in Leipzig in 1890.

He edited the Vierteljahrsschrift für wissenschaftliche Philosophie (Quarterly Journal for Scholarly Philosophy), and was extraordinary professor in the University of Leipzig. He wrote on philosophical subjects, but is known above all for his Philosophie der Geschichte als Sociologie (Philosophy of History as Sociology), the first volume of which appeared in 1897. This book is one of the most authoritative historical sketches of the development of sociological theory which had been published in Germany.

Among Barth's other writings were:

- Beweggründe des sittlichen Handelns (Motives for acting ethically; 1889)
- Geschichtsphilosophie Hegels und die Hegelianer bis auf Marx und Hartmann (Hegel's philosophy of history and the Hegelians up to Marx and Hartmann; 1890)
- Tiberius Gracchus (2d ed., 1893)
- Philosophy of History of Sociology (1897)
- History of Education in the Light of Sociology and History of Ideas (1911)
- The Necessity of a Systematic Moral Teaching (1922).

== Family ==
He married Margarethe Schirmer on 7 April 1902.
