= 1910 in philosophy =

1910 in philosophy

== Publications ==
- Lucien Lévy-Bruhl, How Natives Think (1910, published in English in 1926)
- Bertrand Russell, Principia Mathematica Volume I

== Births ==
- October 29 - A. J. Ayer (died 1989)
