= 1914 in philosophy =

1914 in philosophy

== Births ==
- May 14 – Teodor Oizerman (died 2017)

== Deaths ==
- April 19 – Charles Sanders Peirce (born 1839)
- June 23 – Bhaktivinoda Thakur, Indian philosopher and guru (born 1838)
- October 27 – Theodor Lipps, German philosopher (born 1851)
