= 1905 in philosophy =

1905 in philosophy

== Births ==
- January 1 – Malek Bennabi, (died 1973)
- February 2 - Ayn Rand (died 1982)
- June 21 - Jean-Paul Sartre (died 1980)
- January 8 - Carl Gustav Hempel (died 1997)
- August 24 - Anton Charles Pegis (died 1978)

== Deaths ==
- January 19 – Debendranath Tagore, Indian philosopher and author (b. 1817)
