= 1924 in philosophy =

1924 in philosophy

== Events ==
- The Vienna Circle was formed in 1924.
- Louis De Broglie's contribution in the Philosophical Magazine will subsequently be viewed as a crucial contribution to the birth of quantum mechanics, leading to a revolution in the philosophy of science.

== Publications ==
- Max Scheler, Problems of a Sociology of Knowledge (1924)

=== Philosophical literature ===
- Yevgeny Zamyatin, We (1924)

== Births ==
- January 13 - Paul Feyerabend (died 1994)
- March 27 - Harry Stopes-Roe (died 2014)
- April 14 - Mary Warnock (died 2019)
- June 13 – Bronisław Baczko, Polish philosopher, historian of ideas (died 2016)
- June 21 - Jean Laplanche (died 2012)
- August 10 - Jean-François Lyotard (died 1998)
- September 27 - Ernest Becker (died 1974)
- November 7 - Anđelko Habazin, Yugoslav/Croatian philosopher (d. 1978)

== Deaths ==
- January 21 - Vladimir Lenin (born 1870)
- July 13 - Alfred Marshall (born 1842)
