= 1907 in philosophy =

1907 in philosophy

== Publications ==
- Hastings Rashdall, The Theory of Good and Evil
- Henri Bergson, L’Évolution créatrice

== Births ==
- July 18 - H. L. A. Hart, English legal philosopher (died 1992)
- November 30 - Jacques Barzun, French-born historian (died 2012)

== Deaths ==
- 17 December 1907 - Lord Kelvin, English mathematician, engineer and professor of Natural Philosophy
