= 1904 in philosophy =

1904 in philosophy

== Births ==
- January 29 – Arnold Gehlen (died 1976)
- March 20 – B. F. Skinner (died 1990)
