= 1903 in philosophy =

1903 in philosophy

== Publications ==
- Konstantin Tsiolkovsky, The Exploration of Cosmic Space by Means of Reaction Devices (1903)
- Georg Simmel, The Metropolis and Mental Life (1903)
- W. E. B. Du Bois, The Souls of Black Folk (1903)
- G. E. Moore, Principia Ethica (1903) and The Refutation of Idealism (1903)

== Births ==
- February 22 - Frank Ramsey (died 1930)
- May 10 - Hans Jonas (died 1993)
- September 11 - Theodor W. Adorno (died 1969)

== Deaths ==
- October 4 - Otto Weininger (born 1880)
- November 1 - Theodor Mommsen (born 1817)
- December 8 - Herbert Spencer (born 1820)
