= 1909 in philosophy =

== Publications ==
Rudolf Eucken - The Life of the Spirit: An Introduction to Philosophy

== Births ==
- February 3 – Simone Weil (died 1943)

== Deaths ==
- October 19 – Cesare Lombroso (born 1835)
