= 1927 in philosophy =

1927 in philosophy

== Events ==
- Henri Bergson was awarded the 1927 Nobel Prize in Literature "in recognition of his rich and vitalizing ideas and the brilliant skill with which they have been presented".

== Publications ==
- Bertrand Russell, Why I Am Not a Christian (1927)
- George Sarton, Introduction to the History of Science (1927-1948)
- Carl Schmitt, The Concept of the Political (1927)
- Martin Heidegger, Being and Time (1927)

== Births ==
- February 24 - Ernst Sieber, Swiss pastor (died 2018)
- May 5 - Robert Spaemann, German Catholic philosopher (died 2018)
- May 7 - Joseph Agassi, Israeli philosopher (died 2023)
- September 4 - John McCarthy, American pioneer of Artificial Intelligence (died 2011)
- September 23 - Klaus Heinrich, German philosopher of religion (died 2020)
- October 23 - Leszek Kołakowski, Polish philosopher (died 2009)
- October 31 - Edmund Gettier, American philosopher (died 2020)
- December 20 - David Markson, American experimental novelist (died 2010)

== Deaths ==
- March 31 - Kang Youwei (born 1858)
