= 1928 in philosophy =

1928 in philosophy

== Publications ==
- Konstantin Tsiolkovsky, The Will of the Universe: The Unknown Intelligence (1928)
- Rudolf Carnap, The Logical Structure of the World (1928) and Pseudoproblems in Philosophy (1928)
- Helmuth Plessner, Die Stufen des Organischen und der Mensch (in German, not yet translated into English, 1928)

=== Philosophical literature ===
- Stefan George, The New Empire (originally published in German as Das Neue Reich, 1928)

== Births ==
- February 26 – Odo Marquard (died 2015)
- March 19 – Hans Küng (died 2021)
- May 4 – Elemér Hankiss, Hungarian sociologist and philosopher (died 2015)
- June 8 – Gustavo Gutiérrez, Peruvian philosopher, Catholic theologian and Dominican priest, a founders of liberation theology (died 2024)
- July 15 – Nicholas Rescher
- September 6 – Robert M. Pirsig (died 2017)
- September 14 – Humberto Maturana (died 2021)
- October 2 – Wolfhart Pannenberg (died 2014)
- October 4 – Alvin Toffler (died 2016)
- December 7 – Noam Chomsky
- December 13 – Solomon Feferman (died 2016)
- December 16 – Philip K. Dick (died 1982)

== Deaths ==
- May 19 - Max Scheler (born 1874)
