= 1911 in philosophy =

1911 in philosophy

== Births ==
- March 26 - J. L. Austin, English philosopher of language (d. 1960)
- June 4 or 12 - Milovan Đilas, Montenegrin Yugoslav Marxist theoretician, politician, Partisan, dissident and author (d. 1995)
- June 11 - Norman Malcolm, American philosopher (d. 1990)
