= 1915 in philosophy =

== Publications ==
- Hugo Krabbe – Die moderne staatsidee

== Births ==
- January 6 – Alan Watts, English-born philosopher (d. 1973)
- June 27 – Grace Lee Boggs, American author, social activist and philosopher (d. 2015)
- November 12 – Roland Barthes, French philosopher, literary theorist (d. 1980)

== Deaths ==
- February 18 – Francisco Giner de los Ríos, Spanish philosopher, educator (b. 1839)
- May 7 – Elbert Hubbard, American writer and philosopher, drowned in sinking of the RMS Lusitania (b. 1856)
- May 26 – Emil Lask, German philosopher (killed in action) (b. 1875)
- October 22 – Wilhelm Windelband, German philosopher (b. 1848)
