= 1920 in philosophy =

1920 in philosophy was a significant year for the publication of modern philosophy.

== Publications ==
- Sigmund Freud, Beyond the Pleasure Principle (Jenseits des Lustprinzips)
- William Inge, The Idea of Progress

== Births ==
- May 12 - Vilém Flusser (died 1991)
- July 13 - Hans Blumenberg (died 1996)
- October 3 - Philippa Foot (died 2010)

== Deaths ==
- June 14 - Max Weber (born 1864)
- August 31 - Wilhelm Wundt (born 1832)
- November 27 - Alexius Meinong (born 1853)
