= 1923 in philosophy =

1923 in philosophy saw the publication of several notable books.

== Publications ==
- George Santayana, Scepticism and Animal Faith (1923)
- John Cowper Powys, Psychoanalysis and Morality (1923)
- Ernst Cassirer, Philosophy of Symbolic Forms (1923)
- Martin Buber, I and Thou (1923)
- György Lukács, History and Class Consciousness (1923)
- Walter Benjamin, The Task of the Translator (1923)
- I. A. Richards, The Meaning of Meaning (1923)

== Births ==
- January 8 – Joseph Weizenbaum (died 2008)
- January 11 – Ernst Nolte (died 2016)
- February 9 – André Gorz (died 2007)
- May 29 – Eduardo Lourenço (died 2020)
- June 3 – Wolfgang Stegmüller (died 1991)
- December 29 – Cheikh Anta Diop (died 1986)

== Deaths ==
- February 1 – Ernst Troeltsch (born 1865)
- June 29 – Fritz Mauthner (born 1849)
- August 19 – Vilfredo Pareto (born 1848)
