= 1917 in philosophy =

1917 in philosophy

== Publications ==
- Bertrand Russell, Political Ideals (1917)

== Births ==
- February 17 - Abdel Rahman Badawi, Egyptian existentialist philosopher (died 2002)
- August 25 - J. L. Mackie, Australian philosopher (died 1981)
- September 26 - Tran Duc Thao, Vietnamese philosopher (died 1993)

== Deaths ==
- March 17 - Franz Brentano (born 1838)
