= 1918 in philosophy =

1918 in philosophy was at the end of World War I.

== Events ==
- August – Ludwig Wittgenstein completes his Tractatus Logico-Philosophicus.

== Publications ==
- William Inge – The Philosophy of Plotinus

== Births ==
- June 9 – John Hospers, American philosopher (died 2011)
- October 16 – Louis Althusser, French Marxist philosopher (died 1990)

== Deaths ==
- April 4 – Hermann Cohen, German philosopher (born 1842)
- May 30 – Georgi Plekhanov, Russian revolutionary and philosopher (born 1856)
- September 28 – Georg Simmel, German sociologist and philosopher (born 1858)
