= González (surname) =

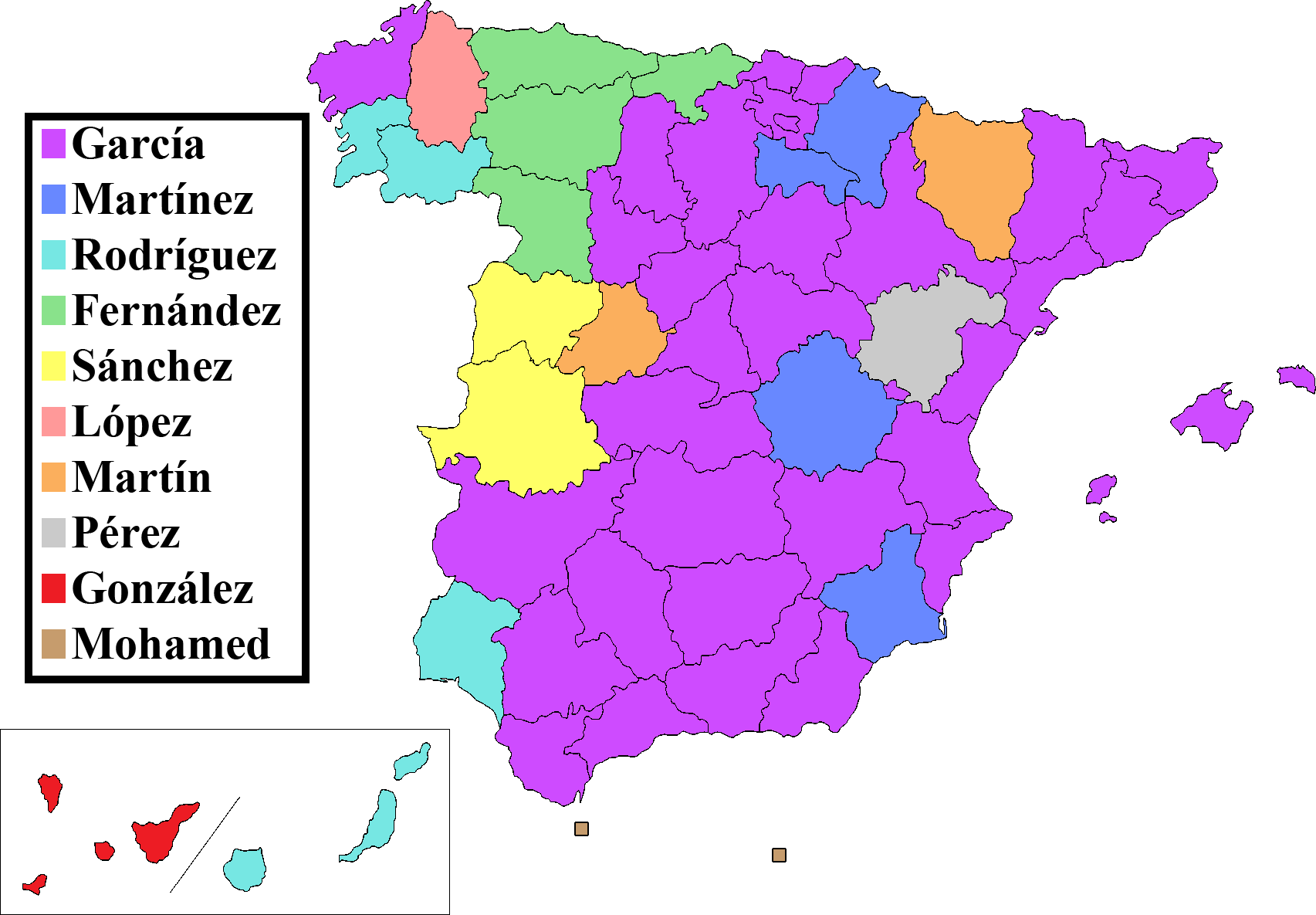
- In 2006, González was the most common surname in the Province of Santa Cruz de Tenerife
- Pronunciation: Plural Gonzálezes; possessive González's, Gonzálezes'
- Language: Ancient Germanic, Gothic, Spanish

Origin
- Meaning: "Noble warrior", "Son of Gonzalo"
- Region of origin: Spain

Other names
- Variant forms: Gonzalez (no accent); González; Gonzalesi; Gonzalés; Gonçalves
- Related names: Gunther; Günther

González is a Spanish surname of Germanic origin, the second most common (2.16% of the population) in Spain, as well as one of the five most common surnames in Argentina, Chile, Mexico, Paraguay, and Venezuela, and one of the most common surnames in the entire Spanish-speaking world. As of 2017, it is the 13th most common surname in the United States.

== Origin ==
González is a Spanish name. Its origins trace back to a Visigothic name combining the words gunþo (guntho) (battle or war) and alf (elf); the Latinized form was Gundisalv. As the Spanish language developed, the name transformed into Gonzalo and its surname derivative González. Some believe the name to mean "war hall", as evidenced by the old Norse words "Gunn/Gunnar", meaning "War/warrior" and the old Norse word "salaz" meaning "hall", whereby "gunnsalaz" may have very likely been the original Visigoth word for "castle" before they eventually adopted the Roman-Latin "castellum" and then "castle" for the building -- a process which continued across much of our old Norse world of today, wherein nations like Iceland use the word "kastali" as their word for castle. And even in the German language, one of the words for "castle" is "schloss", which is an alteration of the old Norse word "salaz" meaning "hall", wherein "salaz" may also be pronounced as "shalaz" and the first vowel eliminated entirely, leaving "shlaz", pronounced "shloss", which is then spelled as the modern German word "schloss".

González is taken to mean "son of Gonzalo", e.g. son of a "noble warrior", "soldier" or "castle guard". Common spellings include: González (common Spanish spelling), Gonzales (alternate Spanish spelling), Gonzalez (omitting the acute accent, a spelling often used in English speaking countries), Gonzalès (French adaptation), and Gonçalves (Portuguese spelling).

An alternate explanation is "the worker in metals" or "smith".

== Geographical distribution ==
As of 2014, 31.8% of all known bearers of the surname González were residents of Mexico (frequency 1:44), 10.8% of Spain (1:49), 10.0% of Venezuela (1:34), 7.4% of Argentina (1:66), 7.1% of the United States (1:584), 6.7% of Colombia (1:81), 5.1% of Cuba (1:26), 4.2% of Chile (1:48), 3.1% of Paraguay (1:27), 2.7% of Guatemala (1:68), 1.7% of Panama (1:27), 1.7% of Nicaragua (1:42), 1.4% of the Dominican Republic (1:85), 1.1% of El Salvador (1:67) and 1.1% of Ecuador (1:171).

In Spain, the frequency of the surname was higher than the national average (1:49) in the following autonomous communities:

1. Asturias (1:20)
2. Canary Islands (1:22)
3. Castile and León (1:29)
4. Cantabria (1:30)
5. Galicia (1:33)
6. Extremadura (1:36)
7. Andalusia (1:49)

In Cuba, the frequency of the surname was higher than the national average (1:26) in the following provinces:

1. Artemisa (1:18)
2. Cienfuegos (1:19)
3. Mayabeque (1:19)
4. Ciego de Ávila (1:19)
5. Matanzas (1:24)
6. Sancti Spíritus (1:24)
7. Isla de la Juventud (1:24)
8. Pinar del Río (1:25)
9. Villa Clara (1:25)
10. Santiago de Cuba (1:25)

== People named González ==
=== The arts ===
- Adrian Gonzales (1937–1998), Filipino comics artist
- Adrián Luis González (born 1939), Mexican potter
- Antonio González Caballero (1927–2003), Mexican painter, pedagogue and screenwriter
- Beatriz González (1932–2026), Colombian painter, sculptor and art historian
- Belle Gonzales (born 1931), Filipino-born singer active in England
- Eva Gonzalès (1849–1883), French painter
- Fernando González Gortázar (1942–2022), Mexican architect, sculptor and writer
- Francisco González Gómez (1918–1990), Spanish caricaturist, painter and sculptor
- Jaime Guadalupe González Domínguez (1975–2013), Mexican journalist
- Jorge González Camarena (1908–1980), Mexican painter, muralist and sculptor
- Jose B. Gonzalez, American poet
- José Emilio González (1918–1990), Puerto Rican literary critic and editor
- Jose Luis Gonzalez (artist) (born 1939), Mexican-American artist
- José González (artist) (1939–2009), Spanish comic book artist
- Juan Gonzalez (artist) (1942–1993), 20th century Cuban-American painter
- Julio González (sculptor) (1876–1942), Spanish sculptor and painter
- Manuel Gonzales (1913–1993), Spanish-American Disney comics artist
- Marcelina Gonzales (born 1989), American visual artist
- Mercedes Elena Gonzalez (born 1952), artist from Caracas, Venezuela
- Suzy González (born 1989), American artist and activist
- Xavier Gonzalez (1898–1993), American artist
- Agustina González López (1891–1936), writer and artist from the Generation of '27
- Mercedes González Tola (1860–1911), Ecuadorian poet and playwright
- Nieves González (born 1996), Spanish painter

==== Film, television, and theater ====
- Alejandro González Iñárritu (born 1963), Mexican filmmaker
- Álvaro Díaz González (born 1972), Chilean journalist, producer and director
- Anthony Gonzalez (actor) (born 2004), American actor
- Beauty Gonzalez (born 1991), Filipina-Spanish actress and former reality show contestant
- Bianca Gonzalez (born 1983), Filipina television host and model
- Carlos González (cinematographer), Venezuelan cinematographer and director
- Charlene Gonzales (born 1974), Filipino actress, media personality and beauty pageant titleholder
- Daniel Brühl (born 1978 as Daniel César Martín Brühl González), German and Spanish actor
- Danny Gonzalez (born 1994), YouTube commentator
- Edith González (1964–2019), Mexican actress
- Eiza González (born 1990), Mexican actress and singer
- Erich Gonzales (born 1990), Filipina actress
- Fernando González Pacheco (1932–2014), Colombian television host, announcer, journalist and occasional actor
- Juan González (journalist) (born 1947), Puerto Rican journalist
- Laura G (born 1985 as María Sonia Laura González Martínez), Mexican television presenter and journalist
- Lexi Gonzales (born 2000), Filipina actress
- Luis Gonzales (1928–2012), Flipino actor
- Luis Gonzalez, a character in Chiquititas
- Luz Elena González (born 1974), Mexican actress and model
- Mandy Gonzalez (born 1978), American actress and singer
- Mauricio González de la Garza (1923–1995), Mexican journalist, writer and music composer
- Mónica González (dancer), Argentine professional theater dancer and vedette, as well as the wife of TV host and comedian José María Listorti
- Myrtle Gonzalez (1891–1918), American actress
- Nacho Vidal (born 1973 as Ignacio Jordi González), Spanish pornographic actor and director
- Nicandro Díaz González (1963–2024), Mexican telenovela producer
- Nicholas Gonzalez (born 1976), American actor
- Pedro González (humorist) (born 1965), Colombian humorist, journalist and actor
- Pedro Gonzalez Gonzalez (1925–2006), American actor
- Raúl González (host) (born 1971), Venezuelan TV host and actor
- Rick Gonzalez (born 1979), American actor
- Robert Gant (born 1968 as Robert Gonzalez), American actor
- Speedy Gonzales, Warner Bros. theatrical cartoon character
- Susana González (born 1973), Mexican actress and model
- Víctor González (actor) (born 1973), Mexican actor
- Yon González (born 1986), Spanish actor

==== Literature ====
- Ana Marta González (born 1969), Spanish professor and philosopher
- Ángel González Muñiz (1925–2008), Spanish poet
- Dulce María González (1958–2014), Mexican writer and educator
- Enrique González Martínez (1871–1952), Mexican poet, diplomat, surgeon and obstetrician
- Enrique González Rojo Sr. (1899–1939), Mexican writer
- Enrique González Rojo Jr. (1928–2021), Mexican writer and philosopher
- Enriqueta González Rubín (1832–1877), Spanish writer
- Urbano González Serrano (1848–1904), Spanish intellectual
- Fernando González (writer) (1895–1964), Columbian writer and philosopher
- Francisco González Bocanegra (1824–1861), Mexican poet
- José Antonio González de Salas (1588–1654), Spanish humanist and writer
- José Luis González (writer) (1926–1996), Puerto Rican author and essayist
- Juan Ignacio González del Castillo (1763–1800), Spanish author of comic theatre
- Manuel González Zeledón (1864–1936), Costa Rican writer
- Maria Teresa Maia Gonzalez (born 1958), Portuguese writer
- Nelly Sfeir Gonzalez (1930–2020), American librarian and bibliographer
- Oscar Gonzáles (writer), author and poet born in Puerto Cortes, Honduras

==== Music ====
- Alex González (musician) (born 1969), American-Mexican musician and drummer
- Andrew Gonzales, past drummer of Reel Big Fish
- Andy González (musician) (1951–2020), jazz double bassist
- Anthony Gerard Gonzalez, vocalist of M83
- Babs Gonzales (1919–1980), American bebop vocalist and poet
- Chilly Gonzales (born 1972), Canadian musician, songwriter, and producer
- Danny Gonzalez (born 1994), YouTube commentator
- Dennis González (1954–2022), American jazz trumpeter
- Emilio González Gabarre, member of Los Chichos
- Enrique González "La Pulga" (1890–1957), Cuban singer-songwriter
- Eulalio González (1921–2003), Mexican singer-songwriter
- Fernando González Casellas (1925–1998), Argentine composer of classical music
- Francisco González Gamarra (1890–1972), Peruvian composer
- Greg Gonzalez (born 1982), American musician
- Guillermo Gonzalez (pianist), Spanish classical pianist
- Hilario González (1920–1999), Cuban composer
- Iván González, past keyboard player of Maná
- Jaime González (composer) (born 1956), Chilean composer
- Jaslene Gonzalez (born 1986), Puerto Rican model and television host
- Jerry González (1949–2018), American bandleader, trumpeter, and percussionist
- Joaquin Diaz González (born 1947), Spanish enthnomusicologist
- Jorge González (musician) (born 1964), Chilean musician
- Jorge González (singer) (born 1988), Romani Spanish singer
- José González (singer) (born 1978), Swedish indie musician
- José Luis González (composer) (born 1937), Mexican composer
- Juan de Marcos González (born 1954), Cuban bandleader, musician, and actor
- Julio González Gabarre, member of Los Chichos
- Leonor González Mina (1934–2024), Afro-Colombian musician and actress
- Luis "Checho" González (1933–2022), Chilean musician
- Nelson González (born 1948), Puerto Rican musician
- Pedro J. González (1895–1995), Mexican singer, guitarist, and songwriter
- Quique González (born 1973), Spanish singer-songwriter
- Ramón González Barrón (1890–1972), Spanish composer and choral conductor
- Roberto González-Monjas (born 1988), Spanish classical violinist and conductor
- Rockdrigo González (1950–1985), Mexican singer-songwriter
- Rodrigo González (musician) (born 1968), Chilean-born German musician
- Rubén González (pianist) (1919–2003), Cuban musician
- Scheila Gonzalez (born 1971), American Grammy-winning multi-instrumentalist
- Siddhartha (musician) (born 1985), Mexican musician
- Canserbero (1988–2015), Venezuelan singer-songwriter and activist
- Yann Gonzalez (born 1977), French filmmaker

=== Catholic Church ===
- Alexia González-Barros González
- Antonio González (martyr)
- Conchita, Jacinta and Mari Cruz González, girls that claimed to have witnessed apparitions in Garabandal
- José González Rubio
- José Higinio Gómez González
- Manuel González García (bishop)
- Peter González

=== Crime ===
- Adrián Gómez González
- Albert Gonzalez
- Daniel Gonzalez (spree killer)
- Fernando González, one of the Cuban Five
- Gustavo González Castro
- José González Valencia
- Julio González
- Sef Gonzales

=== Military ===
- Alfredo Cantu Gonzalez
- Ambrosio José Gonzales
- Antonio González de Balcarce
- Juan Picasso González
- Pedro González Llamas
- Samuel González Toloza

=== Other fields ===
- Alberto González (humorist) (1928–2012), Cuban humorist and iconoclast
- Alberto Jose González (born 1972), Spanish video game graphic artist, music composer and designer
- Ambrose E. Gonzales (1857–1926), Cuban-American co-founder of The State newspaper
- Andrew Gonzalez (1940–2006), Filipino linguist, writer, educator, and Lasallian Brother
- Christine Gonzalez, first woman train engineer for Class 1 railroad
- Clotilde González de Fernández (1880–1935), Argentine educator, writer
- Elián González (born 1993), Cuban child who was the center of a custody battle
- Felipe González de Ahedo (1702–1792), Spanish navigator and cartographer
- Felipe González de Canales, one of the founders of Escuelas Familiares Agrarias
- Fernán González of Castile (c. 910–970), first autonomous count of Castile
- Fernando González de Traba (fl. 1159–1165) Galician nobleman
- Fernando González Ollé (1929–2025), Spanish linguist
- Gilberth González (born 1935), served as the executive director and member of the board of the Interamerican Scout Foundation
- Gómez González (died October 26, 1111), Castilian nobleman
- Gómez González de Manzanedo (died 1182), Castilian magnate
- Gómez González de Traba (fl. 1164–1209), Galician nobleman
- Inés González Árraga (born 1973), Venezuelan political prisoner
- Jesús Rodríguez Gonzáles (1939–1995), Cuban chess player
- José Eleuterio González (1813–1888), Mexican physician and philanthropist
- José Manuel González-Paramo (born 1958), Spanish economist
- José Ramón González, Puerto Rican businessman
- Juan González de Mendoza (c. 1540–1617), Spanish sinologist
- Justo L. González (born 1937), Theologian, author
- Laura González (Miss Colombia) (born 1995), Miss Colombia
- Lori Stewart Gonzalez (born 1957), American speech pathologist and academic administrator
- Luis Eduardo González (1945–2016), Uruguayan political scientist, sociologist and polling specialist
- Luis González Palma (born 1957), Guatemalan photographer
- Luis González y González (1925–2003), Mexican historian
- Manuel Críspulo González y Soto (1846–1933), Spanish entrepreneur and philanthropist
- Marianne Cruz Gonzalez (born 1985), Dominican Republic beauty contest model
- Mauricio González-Gordon y Díez (1923–2013), Spanish sherry maker and conservationist
- Mauricio González Sfeir (born 1956), Bolivian businessman
- Mike Gonzalez (historian) (born 1943), British historian and literary critic
- Narciso Gener Gonzales (1858–1903), Cuban-American co-founder of The State newspaper
- Nicolle Gonzales (born 1980), Navajo certified midwife
- Pedro González de Lara (fl. 1095–1130), Spanish noble and statesman
- Pedro González de Mendoza (1428–1495), Spanish cardinal and statesman
- Raul Gonzalez (journalist) (c. 1935–2013), Filipino journalist, and columnist
- Rodrigo González de Lara (fl. 1078–1143), Castilian nobleman of the House of Lara
- Rolando Gonzalez-Bunster (born c. 1949), US-based Argentine businessman
- Víctor González Torres (born 1947), Mexican businessman
- Walter Gonzalez Gonzalez (1924–1979), Bolivian-American civil engineer & academic
- William Elliott Gonzales (1866–1937), United States Ambassador
- X González (born 1999), American activist and advocate for gun control
- Zack Peter (Zack Gonzalez, born 1993), American comedian, author, and activist

=== Politics and law ===
- Abraham González (governor) (1864–1913), Mexican politician
- Alberto Gonzales (born 1955). American lawyer
- Alexandria Gonzales, Filipino politician
- Alicia García-Salcedo González (1903–2003), Spanish lawyer
- Antonio González, 1st Marquess of Valdeterrazo (1792–1856), Spanish politician, diplomat and jurist
- Antonio González de Aguilar, 8th Marquess of la Vega de Armijo (1824–1908), Spanish noble and politician
- Arely Gómez González (born 1952), Mexican politician
- Carlos Hank Gonzalez (1927–2001), Mexican politician
- Cecilia González Gómez (1961–2017), Mexican politician
- Charlie Gonzalez (born 1945), American politician
- Edgar González Jr. (born 1986), American politician
- Enrique Cárdenas González (1927–2018), Mexican politician
- Enrique González Pedrero (1930–2021), Mexican politician and writer
- Enrique Parejo González, Colombian politician
- Ervin A. Gonzalez (1960–2017), American politician
- Felipe González (born 1942), Spanish politician
- Felipe González González
- Fernando González Laxe (born 1952), Spanish politician
- Fernando González Roa, Mexican lawyer, politician and diplomat
- Francisco González de la Vega (1901–1976), Mexican jurist and politician
- Henry B. González (1916–2000), American politician
- Iván Hernández González, Puerto Rican politician
- Jenniffer González-Colón (born 1976), American politician
- Jorge Emilio González Martínez (born 1972), Mexican politician
- Jorge González Otero (born 1957), Puerto Rican politician
- Jorge González Torres, Mexican politician
- Jorge González von Marées (1900–1962), Chilean political figure and author
- Jose Alejandro Gonzalez Jr. (born 1931), American federal judge
- José Antonio González Caviedes (1938–1996), Spanish politician
- José Antonio González Pizarro (born 1953), Chilean politician
- José Emilio González Velázquez (born 1953), Puerto Rican politician and senator
- José González Gallo (1900–1957), Mexican politician
- José González Morfin (born 1954), Mexican politician and lawyer
- José González Ortiz, Puerto Rican politician
- José Soberanis González (born 1946), Mexican politician
- Juan Manuel González Torres, Colombian politician
- Julio Gonzalez (Florida politician) (born 1964), American politician
- Justin Gonzales, American logger and politician
- Lorena Gonzalez (California politician) (born 1971), American union leader
- Lorena González (Seattle politician) (born 1977), American lawyer and former politician
- Luis A. Gonzalez (judge), American judge
- Luis González-Bravo y López de Arjona (1811–1871), Spanish journalist and politician
- Luis Gonzales Posada (born 1945), Peruvian politician
- Luis Enrique Oberto González (1928–2022), Venezuelan politician
- Manuel González Prada (1844–1918), Peruvian politician
- Manuel González-Hontoria y Fernández-Ladreda (1878–1954), Spanish politician and diplomat
- María Teresa Margarita González (born 1961), Argentine politician
- Martha Hilda González Calderón (1965–2025), Mexican lawyer and politician
- Marvin Gonzales, Trinidad and Tobago politician
- Matt Gonzalez (born 1965), American politician, lawyer, and activist
- Miguel González Avelar (1937–2011), Mexican politician
- Pedro Miguel González Pinzón (born 1965), Panamanian politician
- Raul M. Gonzalez (1930–2014), Philippine politician
- Ron Gonzales, American politician and mayor
- Servando Ruiz-Gómez y González-Llanos (1821–1888), Spanish politician and lawyer
- Sixto Agudo González (1916–2004), Spanish politician and World War II resistance member
- Stalin González (born 1980), Venezuelan politician
- Steven González, American judge
- Tony Gonzales (born 1980), American politician
- Vicente Gonzalez (born 1967), American lawyer and politician

==== Presidents ====
- Emiliano González Navero, (1861–1934) 20th president of Paraguay 1908–1910
- José Maldonado González, the last president of the Spanish Republican government in exile
- Juan Gualberto González (1851–1912), 11th president of Paraguay 1890–1894
- Santiago González Portillo (1818–1887), 14th president of El Salvador, 1871–1876
- Juan Natalicio González (1897–1966), 37th president of Paraguay 1948–1949
- Luis Ángel González Macchi (born 1947), 46th president of Paraguay 1999–2003
- Luis Arturo González López (1900–1965), Acting president of Guatemala 1957
- Manuel González Flores (1833–1893), 31st President of Mexico 1880–1884
- Gabriel González Videla (1898–1980), President of Chile 1946–1952

=== Science and technology ===
- Alberto González Domínguez (1904–1982), Argentine mathematician
- Gabriela González (born 1965), Argentine professor of physics and astronomy
- Guillermo Gonzalez (astronomer), Cuban astrophysicist
- Guillermo González Camarena (1917–1965), Mexican inventor of color TV
- Ingrid del Carmen Montes González (born 1958), Puerto Rican chemist
- Jean-Paul Gonzalez (born 1947), French virologist
- José González-Lander (1933–2000), Venezuelan engineer
- Juan E. González, American microbiologist
- Paula González (1932–2016), American environmentalist
- Pilar González i Duarte (born 1945), Spanish chemist

=== Sports ===
- Ángel Martín González (chess player) (born 1953)
- Fernando González (athlete), Cuban Paralympian
- Fernando Gonzalez (fighter) (born 1983), American martial artist
- Gilberto González (triathlete) (born 1970)
- Iván González (canoeist) (born 1964)
- José González García (born 1973), Mexican chess player
- José Luis González (triathlete) (1988–2025), Spanish triathlete
- José Manuel González (born 1970), Spanish Paralympian
- Juan González de Vega (1917–?), Cuban chess player
- Mayra González (born 1968), Cuban rower
- Michelle González (born 1989), Puerto Rican basketball player
- Mike Gonzales (born 1964), American decathlete
- Pancho Gonzalez (1928–1995), United States tennis player
- Raúl González (handballer) (born 1970)
- Reynaldo Vera González-Quevedo (born 1961), Cuban chess player
- Richard Gonzales (table tennis) (born 1971)
- Sofia Gonzalez (born 2001), Swiss Paralympic athlete
- Tomás González (gymnast) (born 1985)
- Tyler Gonzalez (born 2004), American racing driver

==== American (gridiron) football ====
- Anthony Gonzalez (politician) (born 1984)
- Christian Gonzalez (born 2002), American football player
- Dan Gonzalez (born 1974)
- Joaquin Gonzalez (American football) (born 1979)
- Steve Gonzalez (American football) (born 1981)
- Tony Gonzalez (born 1976)
- Zane Gonzalez (born 1995)

==== Association football (soccer) ====
- Adrián González (footballer, born 1976)
- Adrián González (footballer, born 1995)
- Adrián González (Spanish footballer) (born 1988)
- Alberto González Cespedosa (born 1996)
- Alberto González Gonzalito (1922–2003)
- Alberto González Pérez (born 1983)
- Alberto Mario González (1941–2023)
- Alfredo Razon Gonzalez (born 1978)
- Álvaro Rafael González (born 1984)
- Aníbal González (born 1964)
- Antonio González Álvarez
- Campanal I (1912–1984, Guillermo González del Río García)
- Carlos Gonzales (footballer, born 1989)
- Christofer Gonzáles (born 1992)
- Claudio González (Argentine footballer) (1976–2026)
- Claudio González (Chilean footballer) (born 1990)
- Cristian Gonzáles (born 1976)
- Daniel González Calvo (born 1984)
- Darwin González (born 1994)
- Édgar González (Mexican footballer) (born 1980)
- Édgar Daniel González (born 1979)
- Elkin González (born 1980)
- Enrique González Casín (born 1990)
- Enrique Ramos González (born 1956)
- Fernando González (footballer, born 1989)
- Fernando González Valenciaga (1921–1988)
- Fernando Rubén González (born 1994)
- Fran (footballer, born 1969)
- Germán González Blanco (born 1947)
- Ginès Gonzales (1938–2025)
- Gonzalo González (footballer, born 1993)
- Gonzalo González (footballer, born 1995)
- Guillermo Gonzalez (soccer) (born 1986)
- Hernán González (born 1992)
- Hugo González (Chilean footballer) (born 1963)
- Iriome González (born 1987), known simply as Iriome)
- Iván Emmanuel González (born 1987)
- Iván Garrido González (born 1990)
- Iván González López (born 1988)
- Javier González Gómez (born 1974)
- Javier Mercedes González (born 1979)
- Jorge Alfredo Gonzalez (born 1988)
- Jorge Hernández González (born 1988)
- José Francisco González (born 1971)
- José González Ganoza (1954–1987)
- José González Joly (born 1991)
- José Ignacio González (born 1989)
- José Joel González (born 1979)
- José Luis González China (born 1966)
- José Luis González Dávila (1945–1995)
- José Manuel González Hernández (born 1981)
- José Manuel González López (born 1966)
- Juan Carlos González (1924–2010)
- Juan Carlos González (Chilean footballer) (born 1968)
- Juan Cruz González (born 1996)
- Juan Diego González (1980–2020)
- Juan Diego González-Vigil (born 1985)
- Juan González (Uruguayan footballer) (born 1972)
- Juan González Calderón (born 1975)
- Juan Luis González (born 1974)
- Juanito (footballer, born 1954)
- Julio César González Trinidad (born 1992)
- Julio Gómez González (born 1994)
- Julio González Montemurro (born 1953)
- Julio José González (born 1991)
- Julio Raúl González (born 1952)
- Julio Valentín González (born 1981)
- Kily González (born 1974)
- Lorena González (footballer) (born 1989)
- Lucho González (born 1981)
- Mágico González (born 1958)
- Manuel González (footballer, born 1917) (1917–1988)
- Manuel González (footballer, born 1929) (1929–2013)
- Manuel González (footballer, born 1943)
- Manuel González (footballer, born 1953)
- Manuel González (footballer, born 1991)
- Marco González (born 1986), Chilean footballer
- Mariano Fernando González (born 1980)
- Mariano González (born 1981)
- Mark Anthony Gonzalez (born 1994)
- Mark González (born 1984)
- Marvin González (born 1982)
- Mauricio Ernesto González (1942–2018)
- Migue (Miguel Ángel González González, born 1980))
- Miguel Ángel González (Argentine footballer) (born 1983)
- Miguel Ángel González Suárez (1947–2024)
- Miguel González (footballer, born 1990)
- Miguel Gonzalez (soccer)
- Mikel González (born 1985)
- Mónica González (soccer) (born 1978)
- Omar Gonzalez (born 1988)
- Óscar Nadin Díaz González (born 1984)
- Pancho Gonzales (footballer) (1926–2016)
- Pedro González (Peruvian footballer) (born 1943)
- Pedro González Pierella (born 1970)
- Pedro González Vera (born 1967)
- Raúl (footballer) (born 1977)
- Raúl Alberto González (born 1976)
- Raul Gonzalez (soccer)
- Raúl González Guzmán (born 1985)
- Raúl González Robles (born 1991)
- Rónald González Brenes (born 1970)
- Ronald González Tabilo (born 1990)
- Sebastián González (born 1978)
- Sebastián González (Argentine footballer) (born 1992)
- Steve Gonzalez (born 1980)
- Toni González (born 1982)
- Yordi (born 1974, Jorge González Díaz)

==== Baseball ====
- Adrián González (born 1982), brother of Edgar Gonzalez (the infielder)
- Alberto González (baseball) (born 1983)
- Alex Gonzalez (shortstop, born 1973)
- Álex González (shortstop, born 1977)
- Andy González (baseball) (born 1981)
- Carlos González (baseball) (born 1985)
- Chi Chi Gonzalez (born 1992)
- Dan Gonzales (born 1953)
- Denny González (born 1963)
- Dicky Gonzalez (born 1978)
- Edgar Gonzalez (infielder) (born 1978), brother of Adrian Gonzalez
- Édgar González (pitcher) (born 1983)
- Enrique González (baseball) (born 1982)
- Erik González (born 1991)
- Eusebio González (1892–1976)
- Fernando González (baseball) (born 1950)
- Fredi González (born 1964)
- Gabe González (born 1972)
- Geremi González (1975–2008)
- Germán González (born 1962)
- Gio González (born 1985)
- Joe Gonzales (baseball) (1915–1996)
- José González (baseball) (born 1964)
- Juan González (baseball) (born 1969)
- Julio González (pitcher) (1920–1991)
- Julio González (infielder) (born 1952)
- Lariel González (born 1976)
- Larry Gonzales (baseball) (born 1967)
- Luis González (infielder) (born 1979)
- Luis Gonzalez (outfielder, born 1967)
- Luis Fernando González Hoenig (born 1995), baseball outfielder for the San Francisco Giants
- Luis González
- Marco Gonzales (born 1992)
- Marwin González (born 1989)
- Merandy González (born 1995)
- Miguel Alfredo González (1983–2017)
- Miguel González (catcher) (born 1990)
- Miguel González (pitcher) (born 1984)
- Mike González (catcher) (1890–1977)
- Mike Gonzalez (pitcher) (born 1978)
- Orlando González (born 1951)
- Oscar González (baseball) (born 1998)
- Pedro González (baseball) (1937–2021)
- Raúl González (baseball) (born 1973)
- Rene Gonzales (born 1960)
- Romy González (born 1996)
- Tony González (baseball) (1936–2021)
- Vince Gonzales (1925–1981)
- Wikelman González (born 2002)
- Wiki González (born 1974)

==== Basketball ====
- Bobby Gonzalez (born 1963)
- Ixhelt González (born 2004)
- José González (basketball) (1914–1999)
- Miguel González (basketball) (1938–2022)
- Shaylee Gonzales (born 2000)

==== Boxing ====
- Enrique González (boxer) (born 1945)
- Jajaira Gonzalez (born 1997)
- Jorge Luis González (born 1964)
- Julio César González (1976–2012)
- Julio González (Cuban boxer) (born 1961)
- Larry Gonzáles (born 1975)
- Luis González (Chilean boxer) (born 1949)
- Luis González (Venezuelan boxer) (born 1984)
- Mario González (Mexican boxer) (born 1969)
- Miguel Ángel González (boxer) (born 1970)
- Miguel González (Mexican boxer) (born 1967)
- Raúl González (boxer) (born 1967)

==== Cycling ====
- Adrián González (cyclist) (born 1992)
- Alejandro González (cyclist) (born 1972)
- Alexander González (cyclist) (born 1979)
- Bernardo González (1969–2000)
- Chepe González (born 1968)
- Fredy González (born 1975)
- Javier Alberto González (born 1979)
- José Antonio González (cyclist) (born 1946)
- Juan Fierro (born 1974)
- Juan González (cyclist) (born 1972)
- Luis Alberto González (born 1965)
- Pedro González (cyclist) (born 1983)
- Rónald González (cyclist) (born 1981)
- Víctor Hugo González (born 1974)
- Vladimir González (born 1978)

==== Fencing ====
- Alberto González (fencer) (born 1972)
- Enrique González (fencer) (born 1933)
- Julio González (fencer)
- Manuel González (fencer) (born 1950)

==== Hockey ====
- Amanda González (born 1979)
- Antonio González (field hockey) (born 1969)
- María Cruz González (born 1971)

==== Javelin ====
- Antonio González (javelin thrower) (born 1956)
- Ramón González (athlete) (born 1966)

==== Judo ====
- Fernando González (judoka) (born 1969)
- Juan González (judoka) (born 1967)

==== Racing ====
- Javier González (racing driver) (born 1962)
- José Froilán González (1922–2013)
- Juan Manuel González Corominas (born 1968)

==== Rugby ====
- Laura González (rugby union) (born 1993)
- Lucas González Amorosino (born 1985)

==== Shooting ====
- Jorge González (sport shooter) (born 1957)
- José González (Mexican sport shooter) (born 1948)
- José González (Puerto Rican sport shooter) (1925–2016)
- José González (Spanish sport shooter) (1907–?)
- Manuel González (sport shooter)

==== Swimming ====
- Erika González (born 1972)
- Fernando González (swimmer) (born 1950)
- Hugo González (swimmer) (born 1999)
- Jorge González (swimmer) (born 1949)
- José González (Spanish swimmer) (1906–1997)
- Luis González (swimmer) (1925–2019)
- Mario González (swimmer) (born 1975)
- Rodrigo González (swimmer) (born 1968)

==== Tennis ====
- Fernando González (born 1980)
- Francisco González (tennis) (born 1955)
- Máximo González (born 1983)
- Pancho Gonzales (1928–1995)
- Santiago González (tennis) (born 1983)

==== Track and Field ====
- Alegna González (born 1999), racewalker
- Griselda González (born 1965), long-distance runner
- Guillermo González (athlete) (born 1950), sprinter
- Iglandini González (born 1965), long-distance runner
- Iván Darío González (born 1987), middle- and long-distance runner
- Jermaine Gonzales (born 1984), runner
- Jorge González (athlete) (born 1952), Olympic runner
- Jorge González (Spanish athlete) (born 1945), middle-distance runner
- José Antonio González (athlete) (born 1979), race walker
- José Luis González (runner) (born 1957), middle- and long-distance runner
- Luis Javier González (born 1969), middle-distance runner
- Manuel González (athlete) (born 1963), Olympic sprinter
- Mariela González (born 1974), marathon
- Mauricio González (athlete) (born 1960), long-distance runner
- Mayra González (athlete) (born 1973), sprinter
- Radamés González (born 1956), marathon
- Raúl González (racewalker) (born 1952)
- Tomás González (sprinter) (born 1959)

==== Volleyball ====
- Fernando González (volleyball) (born 1989)
- José Luis González (volleyball) (born 1984)
- Juan González (volleyball) (born 1994)
- Juana González (born 1979)

==== Wrestling ====
- Dr. Wagner (Manuel González Rivera, 1936–2004)
- El Hijo del Diablo (born 1962, Juan Carlos Gonzales)
- Jorge González (wrestler) (1966–2010)
- José González (wrestler) (born 1947)
- Raquel Rodriguez (wrestler) (born 1991, Victoria González)
- Stephanie Vaquer (born 1993, Ana Stephanie Vaquer González)

== See also ==
- Gonçalves, Portuguese equivalent of Gonzalez
- Gonsales, Portuguese variation of Gonzalez
- Gonsalves, English variation of Gonçalves
- Gonzales (disambiguation), Spanish variation of Gonzalez
- Gonzalez (disambiguation)
- Gunther, semilegendary king from the Nibelungenlied
- Günther (surname), name sharing the same etymology
