= Gonzalo =

Gonzalo may refer to:

- Gonzalo (name)
- Gonzalo, Dominican Republic, a small town
- Isla Gonzalo, a subantarctic island operated by the Chilean Navy
- Hurricane Gonzalo, 2014

== See also ==
- Gonzalez (disambiguation)
- Gonzales (disambiguation)
- Gonsalves (disambiguation)
- Gonçalves, a name
- Abimael Guzmán, Peruvian Maoist revolutionary also known by his nom de guerre Chairman Gonzalo
