= Gonzalo (name) =

Gonzalo (also Consalvo, latinized Gundisalvus) is a Spanish masculine given name of Germanic origin.

The name is given for Galician Saint Gonzalo (d. c. 1108/12), bishop of Mondoñedo from 1071. It derives from a Gothic name with the first element gunþi- ("battle"). The second element is uncertain, the latinization Gundisalvus may be based on a folk etymological interpretation based on Latin salvus. Suggestions include gunþi-saiwala- (as it were "battle-soul") and gunþis-albs ("battle-elf").

The patronymic surnames of this name are "González", or "Gonçalves" in Portuguese.

== Given name ==
Notable people with the name include:

=== Medieval ===
- Saint Gonzalo (Gonzalo Froilaz, d. c. 1112), bishop of Mondoñedo-Ferrol
- Gonzalo Ruiz or Rodríguez, feudal lord of La Bureba (or Burueba) throughout much of the mid-twelfth century
- Gonzalo Rodríguez Girón (d. 1231), Castilian noble
- Gonzalo de Berceo (d. 1264), Castilian poet
- Gonzalo Pérez (d. c. 1451), Valencian painter

=== Early Modern ===
- Gonzalo de Alvarado (born 15th/16th century), brother of Don Pedro
- Gonzalo Fernández de Córdoba (1453–1515), known as el Gran Capitán, Castilian general and statesman
- Gonzalo Fernández de Córdoba (1585–1635), Spanish military leader
- Gonzalo Fernández de Oviedo y Valdés (1478–1557), Castilian writer and historian
- Gonzalo de Sandoval (1497–1528), Spanish conquistador in New Spain (Mexico)
- Gonzalo Pizarro (1502–1548), Spanish conquistador
- Gonzalo Jiménez de Quesada (1509–1579), Spanish explorer and conquistador in northern South America
- Gonzalo García Zorro (c. 1500–1566), Spanish conquistador who participated in the Spanish conquest of the Muisca people
- Gonzalo Guerrero (fl. 1500), Spanish sailor who was enslaved by the Maya and later became a respected warrior under a Maya Lord
- Gonzalo Macías (born ~1509), Spanish conquistador who participated in the expedition from Santa Marta into the Muisca Confederation
- Gonzalo Méndez de Canço (1554–1622), Spanish Admiral and the seventh Governor of Florida (1596–1603)
- Gonzalo Suárez Rendón (fl. 1540), Spanish conquistador, known as the founder of Boyacá and Tunja

=== Modern ===
- Gonzalo, Duke of Aquitaine (1937–2000)
- Gonzalo Abán (born 1987), Argentine footballer
- Gonzalo Aguirre Beltrán (1908–1996), Mexican anthropologist
- Gonzalo Arango (1931–1975), Colombian poet/novelist and founder of Nadaism
- Gonzalo Arconada (born 1961), Spanish football manager
- Gonzalo Barroilhet (born 1986), Chilean decathlete
- Gonzalo Castro Randón (born 1987), German footballer of Spanish origin
- Gonzalo "Chory" Castro Irizábal (born 1984), Uruguayan footballer
- Gonzalo Colsa (born 1977), Spanish footballer
- Gonzalo Corbalán (born 2002), Argentine basketballer
- Gonzalo Córdova (1863–1928), Ecuadorian president
- Gonzalo Curiel (composer) (1904–1958), Mexican film composer
- Gonzalo P. Curiel (born 1953), United States District Judge
- Gonzalo de la Fuente (born 1984), Spanish footballer
- Gonzalo de la Torre (born 1977), Mexican-American singer-songwriter, director and producer
- Gonzalo Domínguez (1925–2017), Chilean alpine skier
- Gonzalo Escobar (tennis) (born 1989), Ecuadorian tennis player
- Gonzalo Escobar (footballer) (born 1997), Argentine professional footballer
- Gonzalo Fernández (Uruguayan politician) (born 1952), Foreign Minister of Uruguay from 2008 to 2009
- Gonzalo Fernández-Castaño (born 1980), Spanish golfer
- Gonzalo Garcia (basketball) (born 1967), Argentine basketball coach
- Gonzalo Garcia (dancer) (born 1979/1980), New York City Ballet principal dancer
- Gonzalo García García (born 1983), Spanish footballer
- Gonzalo García Núñez (1947–2024), Peruvian economist and politician
- Gonzalo García Torres (born 2004), Spanish footballer
- Gonzalo González (footballer, born 1993), Uruguayan footballer
- Gonzalo González (footballer, born 1995), Argentine footballer
- Gonzalo Higuaín (born 1987), Argentine-French football player
- Gonzalo Javier Rodríguez (born 1984), Argentine football player
- Gonzalo Jara (born 1985), Chilean football player
- Gonzalo Lira ([1968–2024), Chilean-American novelist
- Gonzalo Longo (born 1974), Argentine rugby union player
- Gonzalo Márquez (1946–1984), Venezuelan-American baseball player
- Gonzalo Miranda (born 1979), Chilean track and road cyclist
- Gonzalo Montiel (born 1997), Argentine World Cup winning football player
- Gonzalo Fernández de la Mora, Spanish essayist and politician
- Gonzalo Fernández Parrilla (born 1950), Spanish scholar and translator
- Gonzalo Piermarteri (born 1995), Argentine football player
- Gonzalo Pineda Reyes (born 1982), Mexican football player
- Gonzalo Ramos (actor) (born 1989), Spanish actor
- Gonzalo Ramos (footballer) (born 1991), Uruguayan football player
- Gonzalo Rodríguez (disambiguation), several people
- Gonzalo Rodríguez Gacha (1947–1989), co-founder of the Medellín drug cartel and founder of paramilitarism in Colombia
- Gonzalo Rodriguez-Pereyra (born 1969), British philosopher
- Gonzalo Rodríguez Risco (born 1972), Peruvian playwright and screenwriter
- Gonzalo X. Ruiz, Argentine baroque oboist
- Gonzalo Salas (born 1974), Argentine road cyclist
- Gonzalo Sánchez de Lozada (born 1930), Bolivian politician and businessman
- Gonzalo Schnorr Fornari (born 1999), Brazilian footballer
- Gonzalo Slipak, Argentine actor
- Gonzalo Sorondo (born 1979), Uruguayan footballer
- Gonzalo Suárez (born 1934), Spanish writer/director
- Gonzalo Torrente Ballester (1910–1999), Spanish writer associated with the Generation of '36 movement
- Gonzalo Vargas (born 1981), Uruguayan football player

=== Pseudonym ===
- President Gonzalo, nom de guerre of Shining Path leader and convicted terrorist Abimael Guzmán

=== Fictional characters ===
- Gonzalo (Shakespeare), a courtier in Shakespeare's The Tempest

== Surname ==
- Julie Gonzalo, Argentine-American actress and producer

== See also ==
- Gonçalo, its Portuguese equivalent
- González (surname) and Gonzales (surname), Spanish surnames meaning 'son of Gonzalo'
- Lalo (nickname)
