= Alberto González =

Alberto González may refer to:

- Alberto González (baseball) (born 1983), Venezuelan baseball player
- Alberto González Domínguez (1904–1982), Argentine mathematician
- Alberto González (fencer) (born 1972), Argentine fencer
- Alberto González (football manager) (born 1979), Spanish football manager
- Alberto González (Chilean footballer) (born 1980), midfielder
- Alberto González (footballer, born 1983), Spanish football defender
- Alberto González (footballer, born 1996), Spanish football goalkeeper
- Alberto González Gonzalito (born 1922), Paraguayan football defender
- Alberto González (hammer thrower) (born 1998), Spanish athlete competing in hammer throw
- Alberto González (humorist) (1928–2012), Cuban humorist and iconoclast
- Alberto González Quiroga (1886–1969), Chilean agriculturist and politician
- Alberto González (sailor) (born 1958), Chilean Olympic sailor
- Alberto González (triathlete) (born 1998), Spanish athlete
- Alberto José González (born 1972), Spanish video game graphic artist, music composer and designer
- Alberto Mario González (1941–2023), Argentine football forward

== See also ==
- Albert Gonzalez (born 1981), American computer hacker, and computer criminal
- Alberto Gonzales (born 1955), 80th Attorney General of the United States
