= Gonzalo Rodríguez =

Gonzalo Rodríguez may refer to:

- Gonzalo Rodríguez (athlete), Mexican sprinter
- Gonzalo Rodríguez (footballer, born 1984), Argentine footballer
- Gonzalo Rodríguez (footballer, born 1987), Argentine footballer
- Gonzalo Rodríguez (footballer, born 1990), Argentine footballer
- Gonzalo Rodríguez (footballer, born 1991), Spanish footballer
- Gonzalo Rodríguez (footballer, born 1997), Argentine footballer
- Gonzalo Rodríguez (racing driver) (1971–1999), racing driver
- Gonzalo Rodríguez Anaya (born 1942), Mexican politician
- Gonzalo Rodríguez de las Varillas (1270–1345), Spanish nobleman
- Gonzalo Rodríguez Girón (c. 1160–1231), one of Castile's wealthiest and most powerful nobles
- Gonzalo Rodríguez Lafora (1886–1971), Spanish neurologist
- Gonzalo Rodriguez-Pereyra (born 1969), Argentine philosopher
- Gonzalo Rodríguez Risco (born 1972), Peruvian playwright and screenwriter
- José Gonzalo Rodríguez Gacha (1947–1989), Colombian drug lord
- Gonzalo Ruiz (died 1205), also known as Gonzalo Rodríguez, former ruler of La Bureba in Spain
