= Consalvi =

Consalvi is a surname. Notable people with the surname include:

- Achille Consalvi, Italian actor and film director
- Ercole Consalvi (1757–1824), Italian Roman Catholic cardinal
- Simón Alberto Consalvi (1927–2013), Venezuelan journalist, diplomat, politician, and historian

== See also ==
- Consalvo
