= Gonzalo González =

Gonzalo González may refer to:

- Gonzalo González (footballer, born 1993), Uruguayan footballer
- Gonzalo González (footballer, born 1995), Argentine footballer
