= Quadrilateral (disambiguation) =

A quadrilateral, in geometry, is a polygon with 4 sides.

Quadrilateral may also refer to:

== Places ==
- "Quadrilateral", an alternative name for Southern Dobruja, an area of north-eastern Bulgaria mostly used by Romanians
- Quadrilatero, in the 1848 revolutions, in the Italian states, an area within the group of fortresses at Mantua, Verona, Peschiera, and Legnago

== Political alliances ==
- Quadrilateral Security Dialogue, a strategic alliance of the United States, Japan, Australia and India within Asia.
- Quadrilateral Treaty, a pact between the Argentine provinces of Buenos Aires, Santa Fe, Entre Ríos and Corrientes, signed on 25 January 1822.

== Religion ==
- Chicago–Lambeth Quadrilateral, a four-point statement of fundamental doctrine, in the Anglican Communion
- Wesleyan Quadrilateral, the four sources of doctrine in the Methodist Church

== Other uses ==
- Complete quadrilateral, in projective geometry, a configuration with 4 lines and 6 points
- Golden Quadrilateral, a network of highways in India
- Quadrilateral (horse), thoroughbred racehorse
- Quadrilateral (film), a 2024 Peruvian film

== See also ==
- Quadriliteral
- Quadrangle (geography)
