= Chichos =

Chichos can refer to:

- posole of fresh corn
- Los Chichos
