= Consalvo =

- Gender: male
- Language: Italian
- Name day: 5 February

Origin
- Origin: Germanic via Medieval Latin
- Meaning: "unhurt in battle" or "him who rescues in battle"

Other names
- Related names: Gonzalo, Gonçalo

Consalvo, also occasionally spelled Gonsalvo and also rarely Consalvos, is an Italian male given name. It also occurs as a surname. Its name day is February the 5th.

== Origin ==
It is derived from the medieval Latin name Gundisalvus, which was the Latin form of a Germanic name of Visigoth origin. The original Visigothic name was composed of the elements gund (meaning "war") and salv (meaning uncertain, but could be "saved", "preserved" or "unhurt"). It has also been claimed that, more specifically, it means "him who rescues/helps in battle". It is related to the name Gonzalo

== Given name ==
Notable people with this given name include:

- Consalvo Caputo, Italian Catholic prelate
- Consalvo Carelli, Italian painter
- Consalvo de Cordoba, also known as Gonzalo Fernández de Córdoba, Spanish general
- Consalvo Sanesi, Italian driver

== Surname ==
Notable people with this surname include:

- Jen Consalvo, American entrepreneur
- Louis Consalvo, American mobster
- Mia Consalvo, American professor
- Robert Consalvo, American politician

== See also ==
- Gonzalo (name) (Spanish and others)
- Gonçalo (disambiguation) (Portuguese)
