= Gonzalez =

Gonzalez or González may refer to:

== People ==
- González (surname)

== Places ==
- González, Cesar, Colombia
- González Municipality, Tamaulipas, Mexico
- Gonzalez, Florida, United States
- González Island, Antarctica
- González Anchorage, Antarctica
- Juan González, Adjuntas, Puerto Rico
- Pedro González, Panama

== Other ==
- Ernesto Gonzalez, cartoon character in Bordertown (American TV series)
- Gonzalez (band), a British band, and their 1974 album
- Gonzalez (organ builders), French firm of organ builders
- González Byass, a Spanish winery
- USS Gonzalez, a U.S. Navy destroyer

== See also ==
- Gonçalves, Portuguese equivalent of Gonzalez
- Gonsales, Portuguese variation of Gonzalez
- Gonsalves, English language variation of Gonçalves
- Gonzales (disambiguation)
- Justice Gonzalez (disambiguation)
