= Larry Gonzales =

Larry Gonzales may refer to:

- Larry Gonzales (baseball)
- Larry Gonzales (politician)

== See also ==
- Larry Gonzáles, American boxer
