= Marco González (disambiguation) =

Marco González, Marco Gonzalez, or Marco Gonzales may refer to:

- Marco Antonio González Valdez (born 1972), Mexican politician
- Marco Gonzales (born 1992), American baseball player
- Marco Gonzalez, Mayan archaeological site
- Marco González (born 1986), Chilean former soccer player

== See also ==
- Marcos González (disambiguation)
