= São Gonçalo =

São Gonçalo, named after Gonçalo de Amarante (1187–1259), may refer to:

== Places ==
=== Brazil ===
- São Gonçalo, Rio de Janeiro
- São Gonçalo do Amarante, Rio Grande do Norte
- São Gonçalo do Amarante, Ceará
- São Gonçalo do Abaeté, Minas Gerais
- São Gonçalo dos Campos, Bahia
- São Gonçalo do Gurguéia, Piauí
- São Gonçalo do Pará, Minas Gerais
- São Gonçalo do Piauí, Piauí
- São Gonçalo do Rio Abaixo, Minas Gerais
- São Gonçalo do Rio Preto, Minas Gerais
- São Gonçalo do Sapucaí, Minas Gerais
- São Gonçalo Channel
- São Gonçalo River

=== Portugal ===
- São Gonçalo (Funchal), Madeira
- São Gonçalo de Lagos, Lagos

== Other uses ==
- Convent of São Gonçalo (Angra do Heroísmo), Terceira, Azores
- Igreja de São Gonçalo, a church in Amarante, Portugal
- São Gonçalo Futebol Clube (RN), a Brazilian football club, São Gonçalo do Amarante, Rio Grande do Norte

== See also ==
- Gonçalo
