= Quadrilateral (film) =

- Theatrical release poster
- Directed by: Daniel Rodríguez Risco
- Written by: Daniel Rodríguez Risco; Gonzalo Rodríguez Risco
- Produced by: Daniel Rodríguez Risco; Lucía Utano
- Starring: Lizet Chávez; Amil Mikati; Gonzalo Molina; Valentina Saba; Fausto Molina
- Cinematography: Miguel Valencia
- Edited by: Eric Williams
- Music by: Camilo Sanabria
- Production company: El Colchón Films
- Release dates: March 16, 2024 (FIFF); June 12, 2025 (Peru)
- Running time: 81 minutes
- Country: Peru
- Language: Spanish

Quadrilateral (Spanish: Cuadrilátero, stylized as Cu4dril4tero) is a 2024 Peruvian black comedy-drama thriller film co-written, co-produced and directed by Daniel Rodríguez Risco. Starring Lizet Chávez, Amil Mikati, Gonzalo Molina, Valentina Saba and Fausto Molina. It is about a family of five who must fight among themselves because there is only room for four.

== Synopsis ==
Adriana lives in perfect order with her husband and her two children, until the arrival of her third child causes a great imbalance in her. There is only room for four in his mind. The five members of the family face each other in a macabre game of chairs to occupy one of the four spaces.

== Cast ==
- Lizet Chávez as Adriana
- Gonzalo Molina as Alfredo
- Amil Mikati as Tomás
- Fausto Molina as Felipe
- Valentina Saba as Lucía
- Gianfranco Brero

== Release ==
Quadrilateral had its world premiere on March 16, 2024, at the 38th Fribourg International Film Festival, then screened on September 24, 2024, at the 33rd Biarritz Film Festival, on October 4, 2024, at the 57th Sitges Film Festival, on October 24, 2024, at the Adelaide Film Festival, on November 12, 2024, at the 10th University of Lima Film Week, on December 5, 2024, at the Jagran Film Festival, on February 19, 2025, at the 27th Punta del Este International Film Festival, on March 23, 2025, at the 32nd San Diego Latino Film Festival, and on May 9, 2025, at the 1st Madrid Festival de Cine de las Américas.

The film was commercially released on June 12, 2025, in Peruvian theaters.

== Accolades ==
Year	Award / Festival	Category	Recipient	Result	Ref.
2024	38th Fribourg International Film Festival	Special Jury Award	Quadrilateral	Won	
2024	38th Fribourg International Film Festival	Youth Jury Award COMUNDO	Quadrilateral	Won	
2024	33rd Biarritz Film Festival	Best Film	Quadrilateral	Nominated	
2025	9th Fixion Fest	Best Film	Quadrilateral	Won	
2025	9th Fixion Fest	Best Screenplay	Daniel Rodríguez Risco & Gonzalo Rodríguez Risco	Won	
2025	9th Fixion Fest	Best Art Direction	Quadrilateral	Won	
2025	9th Fixion Fest	Best Actress in a Leading Role	Lizet Chávez	Won	
2025	27th Punta del Este International Film Festival	ACCU Award - Best Fiction	Quadrilateral	Won	
2025	20th European Independent Film Festival	Best Non-European Independent Dramatic Feature	Quadrilateral	Won	
2025	1st Madrid Festival de Cine de las Américas	Best Feature Film	Quadrilateral	Won	
