= Gilda Galán =

Puerto Rican actress

- Born: January 16, 1917; Guayama, Puerto Rico
- Died: June 21, 2009 (aged 92); Carolina, Puerto Rico
- Occupations: Actress; writer; comedian; scriptwriter

Gilda Galán (January 16, 1917 – June 21, 2009) was a Puerto Rican actress, comedian, writer, composer, scriptwriter and poet. The veteran actress, whose career spanned decades, enjoyed one of the longest careers in the history of the Puerto Rican entertainment industry.

== Life ==
Gilda Galán was born in Guayama, Puerto Rico, in 1917.

Galán died on Sunday afternoon, June 21, 2009, at 1:06 P.M. at El Hogar Alivio Dorado nursing home in Carolina, Puerto Rico at the age of 92. Galan had been in declining health during the last six months of her life.

== Career ==
Galán began working at WKAQ (AM) radio in San Juan in 1948 following her graduation from high school. She worked as a programming and writer at WKAQ, as well as a comedic and dramatic voice actress on the air for the station. It was at WKAQ that Galan created her first well known character, La Abuelita or Grandma, and she would continue to play similar roles on television later in her career. She also wrote scripts for comedian and producer, Tommy Muñiz, who performed at WKAQ.

One of Galán's best known roles was as the character, Agnes, in the play Los Soles Truncos by playwright René Marqués. Galan debuted as Agnes in Los Soles Truncos as part of the first inaugural Festival de Teatro Puertorriqueño at the Instituto de Cultura Puertorriqueña in 1958. Her work in Los Soles Truncos catapulted Galán to fame within her profession.

Galán later performed as Bernarda in the play La Casa de Bernarda Alba (The House of Bernarda Alba) by Spanish dramatist Federico García Lorca. Her particular production of Bernarda Alba was directed by Dean Zayas.

In 1967, Galán began appearing in a political satire program, "Se alquilan habitaciones", as the popular main character, Marunga. It was one of the first examples of political satire on Puerto Rican television. The controversial show, which was created and written by political satire humorist Alberto Gonzalez, was pulled from broadcast on several occasions.

Galán continued to work in television roles similar to her character, Marunga, throughout the 1970s.

Galán's other television roles included the comedy, El Beauty, as well as El diario de una mujer, Cuentos de la abuelita and Todo el año es Navidad. Her career in television and theater continued into the 2000s.

== See also ==
- List of Puerto Ricans
- Helena Montalban - who worked with Galan on several theatrical productions
