= Judge Gonzalez =

Judge Gonzalez may refer to:

- Arthur Gonzalez (fl. 1960s–2020s), chief judge of the United States Bankruptcy Court for the Southern District of New York
- Ernesto Gonzalez (judge) (born 1962), judge of the United States District Court for the Western District of Texas
- Hector Gonzalez (judge) (born 1964), judge of the United States District Court for the Eastern District of New York
- Irma Elsa Gonzalez (born 1948), judge of the United States District Court for the Southern District of California
- Jose Alejandro Gonzalez Jr. (born 1931), judge of the United States District Court for the Southern District of Florida
- Kenneth J. Gonzales (born 1964), judge of the United States District Court for the District of New Mexico

== See also ==
- Justice Gonzalez (disambiguation)
