= Marcos González (disambiguation) =

Marcos González may refer to:

- Marcos González (born 1980), Chilean former soccer player
- Marcos González de Balcarce (1777–1832), Argerntine military commander and politician

== See also ==
- Marco González (disambiguation)
