= Gonçalves =

Gonçalves (European Portuguese: [ɡõˈsalvɨʃ], Brazilian Portuguese: [ɡõˈsawvis]; Portuguese for "son of Gonçalo") is a Portuguese surname. Origin: Germanic patronymic Gundisalvis.

Notable people with the surname include:

- Adílio de Oliveira Gonçalves (1956–2024), Brazilian footballer
- Ailton Gonçalves da Silva (born 1973), Brazilian footballer
- Ana Gonçalves (disambiguation), several people
- André Gonçalves (explorer), 15th/16th-century Portuguese explorer of Brazil
- André Gonçalves (painter) (1685–1754), Portuguese Baroque painter
- André Caetano Gonçalves (born 1992), Swiss-Portuguese footballer
- Antão Gonçalves, 15th-century Portuguese explorer
- Dercy Gonçalves (1907–2008), Brazilian actress and comedian
- Diogo Gonçalves (born 1997), Portuguese footballer
- Evaldo Gonçalves (1933–2025), Brazilian politician
- Filipe Gonçalves (born 1984), Portuguese footballer
- Flávio Gonçalves (born 2007), Portuguese footballer
- Gilberto Ribeiro Gonçalves (born 1980), Brazilian footballer
- Gustavo Gonçalves (born 2003), Portuguese canoeist
- Heloísa Borba Gonçalves (born 1950), Brazilian-American convicted fraudster, convicted murderer and suspected serial killer
- Isilda Gonçalves (born 1969), Portuguese race walker
- João Maria Lobo Alves Palhares Costa Palhinha Gonçalves (born 1995), Portuguese footballer
- João Gonçalves Zarco (1390–1471), Portuguese explorer, discovered the archipelago of Madeira
- Joaquim Gonçalves (1936–2013), Portuguese Roman Catholic bishop
- José Gonçalves (disambiguation), several people
- Khalid Gonçalves (born 1971), American actor
- Laura Gonçalves (born 1989), Miss Portugal 2011, Top 10 at Miss Universe 2011
- Marcelo Gonçalves Costa Lopes (born 1966), Brazilian footballer
- Mateus Alberto Contreiras Gonçalves (born 1983), Angolan footballer
- Matheus Gonçalves, Brazilian footballer
- Matheus Trindade, Brazilian footballer, full name Matheus Trindade Gonçalves
- Matheus Sávio, Brazilian footballer, full name Matheus Gonçalves Savio
- Nelson Gonçalves (1919–1998), Brazilian singer and songwriter
- Nuno Gonçalves (fl. 1450–1471), Portuguese artist
- Otacílio Gonçalves (1940–2025), Brazilian football manager
- Paulo Sérgio Moreira Gonçalves (born 1984), Portuguese footballer
- Patricia Gonçalves, several people
- Pedro Gonçalves (disambiguation), several people
- Vanessa Gonçalves (born 1986), Miss Venezuela 2010, Top 16 at Miss Universe 2011
- Vasco Gonçalves (1921–2005), Portuguese Prime Minister
- Vítor Gonçalves (disambiguation), several people

== See also ==
- Gonsalves, English language variation of Gonçalves
- Gonzalez (disambiguation), Spanish equivalent of Gonçalves
  - Gonsales, Portuguese variation of Gonzalez
  - Gonzales (disambiguation), Spanish variation of Gonzalez
