= Gonsales =

Gonsales as a last name is a Portuguese variation of the Spanish surname González/Gonzales. Following Portuguese naming customs, the name originated from a patronymic and meant 'son of Gonsalo'.

== People with the surname ==
- Francisco Rebolo Gonsales (1902–1980), Brazilian painter
- Domingo Gonsales, the pseudonym of author Francis Godwin (1562–1633) with his work The Man in the Moone
- Pablo Gonsales, past member of the band Cymande

== Fictional characters ==
- Police Lt. Edgar "Blackie" Gonsales, character in the 1949 film Tension, played by William Conrad

== See also ==
- Gonçalves, Portuguese equivalent of Gonzalez
  - Gonsalves, English language variation of Gonçalves
- Gonzalez (disambiguation)
  - Gonzales (disambiguation), Spanish variation of Gonzalez
- Saint Gonsalo Garcia (1556–1597)
