= Gonzalo Rodríguez (footballer, born 1991) =

Spanish footballer

Personal information
- Full name: Gonzalo Rodríguez Pacho
- Date of birth: 27 June 1991 (age 35)
- Place of birth: Alcalá de Henares, Spain
- Height: 1.80 m (5 ft 11 in)
- Position: Midfielder

Team information
- Current team: Alcalá

Youth career
- Guadalajara

Senior career*
Years	Team	Apps	(Gls)
2011–2014	Guadalajara	5	(0)
2014–2016	Azuqueca		
2016–	Alcalá		
- * Club domestic league appearances and goals

Gonzalo Rodríguez Pacho (born 27 June 1991) is a Spanish footballer who plays as a midfielder for Alcalá.

== Career ==
Rodríguez's senior career started with Guadalajara in 2011, having previously featured for their youth teams. He made his professional debut in the Segunda División on 3 December 2011 versus Girona, which was one of four appearances in his first two seasons with Guadalajara; which concluded with relegation to Segunda División B. Rodríguez was selected once more in the following campaign of 2013–14, prior to joining Azuqueca. Two years later, Alcalá completed the signing of Rodríguez; having had him on trial years prior.

== Career statistics ==
As of 4 October 2018.

Club statistics
Club	Season	League			Cup (Note: Includes the Copa del Rey)		League Cup		Continental		Other		Total	
Club	Season	Division	Apps	Goals	Apps	Goals	Apps	Goals	Apps	Goals	Apps	Goals	Apps	Goals
Guadalajara	2011–12	Segunda División	1	0	0	0	—		—		0	0	1	0
Guadalajara	2012–13	Segunda División	3	0	0	0	—		—		0	0	3	0
Guadalajara	2013–14	Segunda División B	1	0	0	0	—		—		0	0	1	0
Career total			5	0	0	0	—		—		0	0	5	0
