= José Antonio González de Salas =

Spanish humanist and writer

José Antonio González de Salas (1588 – 1654) was a Spanish humanist and writer. Friend and editor of Francisco de Quevedo, Salas was the author of an important commentary on Petronius's Satyricon.
