= Gonçalo =

Gonçalo is a Portuguese masculine given name and family name, equivalent to the Spanish name Gonzalo.

People with the name include:

- Gonçalo Brandão, a Portuguese footballer
- Gonçalo Coelho, a Portuguese explorer of the South Atlantic and of the South American coast
- Gonçalo Gonçalves, a Brazilian footballer
- Gonçalo Guedes, a Portuguese footballer
- Gonçalo Inácio, a Portuguese footballer
- Gonçalo Malheiro, a Portuguese rugby union footballer
- Gonçalo Nicau, a Portuguese tennis player
- Gonçalo Oliveira, a Portuguese tennis player
- Gonçalo Pereira, a Portuguese guitarist
- Gonçalo Ramos, a Portuguese footballer
- Gonçalo Uva, a Portuguese rugby union player
- Gonçalo Velho, a 15th-century Portuguese monk, explorer and settler of the Atlantic
- Blessed Gonçalo de Amarante, (1187–1259)

== See also ==
- Gonzalo, the Spanish equivalent
- Gonçalves and Gonsalves, a Portuguese surname meaning "son of Gonçalo"
- São Gonçalo (disambiguation)
- Gonçalo alves, a type of wood
