= Jermaine Gonsalves =

British basketball player (born 1976)

Jermaine Gonsalves (born 14 December 1976) is a British professional basketball player, currently playing for Sheffield Sharks in the British Basketball League.

Born in Leicester, England, the 5'11" Guard made his BBL debut starring for the Leicester Riders in 1997, aged 20, against Worthing Bears. Gonsalves left the Riders in 1999, but resigned two years later for a four-year stint. In 2005, he left the professional outfit and joined their second division feeder club, Leicester Warriors. It was here that he was reunited with his former Riders teammates Drew Barrett and Hilroy Thomas. He played with the Warriors for one season only before making the step back up to the top tier, signing for the Sharks in 2006.
