= Manuel González (footballer, born 1953) =

Spanish footballer

Personal information
- Full name: Manuel Vicente González Díaz
- Date of birth: 23 May 1953 (age 73)
- Place of birth: Badajoz, Spain
- Height: 1.80 m (5 ft 11 in)
- Position: Defender

Senior career*
Years	Team	Apps	(Gls)
1972–1974	Sabadell	44	(0)
1974–1978	Sporting Gijón	28	(0)
Total		72	(0)

Managerial career
- 2006–2009: Gramenet
- 2009: Badalona
- * Club domestic league appearances and goals

Manuel Vicente González Díaz (born 23 May 1953) is a Spanish former professional footballer who played as a defender.

== Career ==
González started off his playing career with Sabadell of the Segunda División, the first of fifty-five appearances in two years arrived during December 1972 versus Langreo in the Copa del Rey; his league bow followed days later against Murcia. 1974 saw González join La Liga's Sporting Gijón. After twenty-three matches and two campaigns, the club were relegated to the Segunda División. He failed to make an appearance in the second tier during 1976–77, as Sporting Gijón won promotion back to La Liga. His spell with Sporting Gijón lasted two further seasons, which included him featuring ten times. González subsequently retired.

In 2006, González became the manager of Gramenet in Segunda División B. He guided the club to three consecutive mid-table finishes, winning forty games of a one hundred and seven game tenure. He departed in 2009, joining Badalona soon after. After eight matches he left.

== Career statistics ==
=== Club ===
Club statistics
Club	Season	League			Cup (Note: Includes the Copa del Rey)		League Cup		Continental		Other		Total	
Club	Season	Division	Apps	Goals	Apps	Goals	Apps	Goals	Apps	Goals	Apps	Goals	Apps	Goals
Sabadell	1972–73	Segunda División	14	0	6	0	—		—		0	0	20	0
Sabadell	1973–74	Segunda División	30	0	3	0	—		—		2 (Note: Two appearances in 1973–74 Segunda División play-offs)	0	35	0
Sabadell	Total		44	0	9	0	—		—		2	0	55	0
Sporting Gijón	1974–75	La Liga	3	0	2	0	—		—		0	0	5	0
Sporting Gijón	1975–76	La Liga	15	0	3	0	—		—		0	0	18	0
Sporting Gijón	1976–77	Segunda División	0	0	0	0	—		—		0	0	0	0
Sporting Gijón	1977–78	La Liga	8	0	0	0	—		—		0	0	8	0
Sporting Gijón	1978–79	La Liga	2	0	0	0	—		—		0	0	2	0
Sporting Gijón	Total		28	0	5	0	—		—		0	0	33	0
Career total			72	0	14	0	—		—		2	0	88	0

=== Managerial record ===
Managerial record by team and tenure
Team	From	To	Record					Ref
Team	From	To	P	W	D	L	Win %	Ref
Gramenet	15 October 2006	10 May 2009	107	40	34	33	37.4	
Badalona	30 August 2009	11 October 2009	8	2	1	5	25.0	
Total			115	42	35	38	36.5	—
