= José Gonçalves =

José Gonçalves may refer to:

- José Gonçalves (footballer) (born 1985), Portuguese footballer
- José Gonçalves (cyclist) (born 1989), Portuguese cyclist
