= Justice Gonzalez =

Justice Gonzalez may refer to:

- Alberto Gonzales (born 1955), justice of the Texas Supreme Court
- Raul A. Gonzalez (born 1940), justice of the Texas Supreme Court
- Steven González (born 1963), associate justice of the Washington Supreme Court

== See also ==
- José Fernando Franco González-Salas (born 1950), justice of the Mexican National Supreme Court of Justice
- Raul M. Gonzalez (1930–2014), Secretary of Justice of the Philippines
- Judge Gonzalez (disambiguation)
