= Gonzalo Rodríguez (footballer, born 1987) =

Argentine footballer

Personal information
- Full name: Gonzalo Jesús Rodríguez
- Date of birth: 29 October 1987 (age 39)
- Place of birth: Argentina
- Height: 1.78 m (5 ft 10 in)
- Position: Midfielder

Youth career
- Real Arroyo Seco

Senior career*
Years	Team	Apps	(Gls)
2005	Real Arroyo Seco	1	(0)
2008–2015	Juventud Unida	189	(8)
2016	Juventud Urdinarrain		
2016	Achirense	14	(0)
2017	Indep. de Gualeguaych		
2017–2018	Chaco For Ever	12	(2)
2018–2019	Gimnasia Concepción	15	(1)
2019–2020	Juventud Unida	13	(0)
- * Club domestic league appearances and goals

Gonzalo Jesús Rodríguez (born 29 October 1987) is a retired Argentine footballer who plays as a midfielder.

== Career ==
Real Arroyo Seco gave Rodríguez his first appearance in senior football, selecting him once during Torneo Argentino A action in 2005. In 2008, Rodríguez joined Torneo Argentino B's Juventud Unida. Five years later, following seventeen goals in one hundred and eighteen matches, the club were promoted to Torneo Argentino A; which preceded a further promotion to Primera B Nacional during 2014. 2016 saw Rodríguez spend time with Juventud Urdinarrain and Achirense, prior to playing for Independiente de Gualeguaychú in 2017. Months later, Chaco For Ever of Torneo Federal A signed Rodríguez.

Rodríguez scored goals against San Jorge and Gimnasia y Tiro as Chaco For Ever placed seventh. On 30 June 2018, Rodríguez agreed to join Torneo Federal A's Gimnasia y Esgrima. He made his debut against former club Juventud Unida on 15 September, with his new team winning 0–2. In July 2019, after one goal in nineteen matches for Gimnasia, Rodríguez would return to Juventud Unida for a second spell.

== Career statistics ==
As of 1 September 2020.

Club statistics
Club	Season	League			Cup		League Cup		Continental		Other		Total	
Club	Season	Division	Apps	Goals	Apps	Goals	Apps	Goals	Apps	Goals	Apps	Goals	Apps	Goals
Juventud Unida	2013–14	Torneo Argentino A	22	0	1	0	—		—		4 (Note: Appearance(s) in the Torneo Argentino A play-offs)	0	27	0
Juventud Unida	2014	Torneo Federal A	14	3	0	0	—		—		0	0	14	3
Juventud Unida	2015	Primera B Nacional	35	1	0	0	—		—		0	0	35	1
Juventud Unida	Total		71	4	1	0	—		—		4	0	76	4
Achirense	2016	Torneo Federal B	14	0	0	0	—		—		0	0	14	0
Chaco For Ever	2017–18	Torneo Federal A	12	2	2	1	—		—		0	0	14	3
Gimnasia y Esgrima	2018–19	Torneo Federal A	15	1	0	0	—		—		4 (Note: Appearance(s) in the Torneo Federal A play-offs)	0	19	1
Juventud Unida	2019–20	Torneo Federal A	13	0	0	0	—		—		0	0	13	0
Career total			125	7	3	1	—		—		8	0	136	8
