= Gonzales =

Gonzales may refer to:

== Places ==
- Gonzales, California, U.S.
- Gonzales, Louisiana, U.S.
- Gonzales, Texas, U.S.
- Gonzales County, Texas

== Other uses ==
- Battle of Gonzales, 1835
- Gonzales (horse) (1977 – after 1996), an American-bred Thoroughbred racehorse
- Gonzales (surname)
- Gonzales v. Raich
- Speedy Gonzales, animated cartoon character in the Warner Brothers Looney Tunes
- Gonzales (musician), Chilly Gonzales

== See also ==
- Spanish surname González (surname), also known as Gonzales
- Gonçalves, Portuguese equivalent of Gonzalez (Spanish surname)
- Gonsales, Portuguese variation of Gonzalez (Spanish surname)
- Gonsalves, English language variation of Gonçalves
- Gonzalez (disambiguation)
