= Marcelina Gonzales =

American artist

Marcelina Gonzales (born 1989) is an American visual artist from Brownsville, Texas.

According to Gonzales, her work focuses on her identity as a young Chicana growing up in a neighborhood that is often marginalized and misunderstood.

== Early life and education ==
Gonzales states that much of her work is created to reflect and reconstruct her childhood and personal experiences in Brownsville. Brownsville sits on the southernmost tip of Texas, making it a border-town for the Mexican-American border. Therefore, artistically, Gonzales exemplifies the mingling of these Mexican and American cultures, attitudes, and traditions through an authentic Chicana point of view. She provides a feminist perspective, one that examines sexism, societal expectations for women, traditional gender roles, and female objectification, to address the external challenges that accompany her perceived identity, ability, and class. Gonzales had trouble accepting and loving herself and, as a result, developed debilitating depression and anxiety. She says that she turned to art as a form of therapy which allowed her to pursue empowerment in regards to her gender and cultural identity.

Gonzales went on to study at the University of Texas at Brownsville and received a Bachelor of Arts in Visual Arts in 2013. After completing her bachelor's degree, her primary medium became resin collage. Some of her work takes the form of "puzzling-assemblages", a term she uses to refer to the fact that these pieces can become two-dimensional or three-dimensional depending on where her audience may stand.

== Career ==
In 2020, amidst the Coronavirus outbreak, Gonzales participated in collaborative work with Fields Projects to launch an online initiative called “Corona Care+”. Field Projects is an online project space dedicated to uplifting emerging artists. Now serving as a time capsule, the initiative offered the support and advice from artists as they navigated the pandemic. Here, Gonzales revealed that, outside of art, she works at an agency that provides home health care coordination to elderly and disabled patients and shared an oil tinted resin collage, Don’t eat pistachios in the dark, that she completed during the pandemic.

As an artist, Gonzales has exhibited her art throughout Texas, California, and New York as well as in Germany, Hungary, and Dubai. She uses her work to challenge the preconceptions of what it means to be Chicana and the social, political, economic, religious, and sexual role of women living in contemporary America. This can be seen in the GIRLS will be GIRLS: An All-Women Art Exhibition that she personally curated and in her Object collection. Particularly, in her Object collection, she strives to eliminate the androcentric expectation that is so prevalent in today’s America by redefining and reclaiming the female position in it. She has also used resin collages to create snapshots of her memories growing up in Brownsville which can be seen in her Valley Girl Collection.

=== Notable works ===
- No Class Tomorrow, Bro! in Images of Power Exhibit, a digital piece that depicts the events that took place in Charlottesville, Virginia in 2017
- Tiempo del Vals at Sunrise Mall in Between Two Worlds Exhibit and Valley Girl Collection. A piece that is oil tinted and resin collaged on wood that depicts a quinceñera and her court of honor. This piece can move from two dimensional to three dimensional.
- Let's see what that mouth can do! in GIRLS will be GIRLS: An All-Women Art Exhibition and Valley Girl collection
