= Jen Consalvo =

American Businessperson

- Consalvo at the 2011 SXSW
- Born: Jennifer Consalvo
- Occupations: Co-founder, co-CEO
- Employer: Established
- Known for: COO, Tech Cocktail; Founder, Shiny Heart Ventures
- Website: tech.co

Jennifer "Jen" Consalvo is the co-founder and co-CEO of Established.

== Awards and recognition ==
Consalvo was recognized by The Washingtonian magazine as a 2011 "Washingtonian Tech Titan".

== External References ==
- "Digital nomads ditch cubicles for diners and pool decks". The Mercury News. July 27, 2009.
- Segall, Laurie (November 24, 2010). "Giving thanks, Web 2.0 style". CNN Money. Archived from the original on November 26, 2010.
- "Tech Titans 2013". Washingtonian. Archived from the original on 28 April 2021.
- Overly, Steven (March 24, 2013). "The Download: D.C. Week comes to an end". The Washington Post.
- Borinson, Rebecca (May 19, 2014). "PRESENTING: The 100 Most Influential Tech Women On Twitter". Business Insider Australia.
- Millward, Wade Tyler (January 25, 2018). "British online publishing company buys Las Vegas startup Tech.co". Las Vegas Review Journal.
