= González Island =

Island in Antarctica

- Topographic map of Livingston Island, Greenwich, Robert, Snow and Smith Islands.

- Location within Antarctic Peninsula Location within Antarctica

Geography
- Location: Antarctica
- Coordinates: 62°29′S 59°40′W

Administration
- Administered under the Antarctic Treaty System

Demographics
- Population: Uninhabited

González Island is a small island on the south side of the entrance to Iquique Cove, Discovery Bay, Greenwich Island in the South Shetland Islands. On its west side the island is linked by a spit to a smaller island, which is covered at high tide. The island was charted by the Chilean Antarctic Expedition of 1947, and commanded by Capitan de Navio Federico Guesalaga Toro, who named it after Ernesto González Navarrete, captain of the ship Iquique on the expedition.

== See also ==
- List of antarctic and sub-antarctic islands

== Maps ==
- L.L. Ivanov. Antarctica: Livingston Island and Greenwich, Robert, Snow and Smith Islands. Scale 1:120000 topographic map. Troyan: Manfred Wörner Foundation, 2009. ISBN 978-954-92032-6-4
