= Maria Teresa Maia Gonzalez =

Portuguese writer (born 1958)

- Born: 17 June 1958 (age 68); Coimbra, Portugal
- Occupation: Writer
- Writing career
- Genres: Children's literature Young adult literature

Maria Teresa Maia Gonzalez (born 1958) is a Portuguese writer.

She studied in the Faculty of Letters of the University of Lisbon and was a Portuguese teacher from 1982 to 1997. She has published many books, including Gaspar & Mariana, A Fonte dos Segredos, O Guarda da Praia, O Incendiário Misterioso, Cartas de Beatriz, as well as being the author of the Profissão: Adolescente collection, with 13 books and over 300,000 copies sold. Together with Maria do Rosário Pedreira, she is also a co-author of O Clube das Chaves, a collection with 21 books which has been adapted to a television series. Her most successful book is A Lua de Joana, with 220,000 copies sold (which has been translated into German, Bulgarian, Chinese, Spanish and Albanian).

Candidate for the Swedish Astrid Lindgren Literary Award (ALMA) 2016, which distinguishes literature and illustration for children and the promotion of reading, announced the organization.

On September 29, 2016, the date of the Municipal Holiday of Fornos de Algodres, a toponym was attributed to the Municipal Library of Fornos de Algodres: "Biblioteca Municipal Maria Teresa Maia Gonzalez."
