= Vítor Gonçalves (disambiguation) =

Vítor Gonçalves (born 1951) is a Portuguese filmmaker.

Vítor Gonçalves may also refer to:

- Vítor Gonçalves (footballer, born 1896) (1896–1965)
- Vítor Gonçalves (footballer, born 1944) (1944–2025)
- Vítor Gonçalves (footballer, born 1992)
- Vítor Gonçalves (theatre director) (born 1963), Portuguese theatre director
