= Juan E. González =

American geneticist

- Education: University of California, Los Angeles
- Scientific career
- Workplaces: University of Texas at Dallas

Dr. Juan E. González born in The Bronx, New York is a Professor of Molecular Genetics and Microbiology and Associate Dean for Graduate Studies at The University of Texas at Dallas. González received his Ph.D. from the University of California, Los Angeles in 1991. He was a post-doctoral fellow at the Massachusetts Institute of Technology. He joined the faculty of UTD in 1996 as an assistant professor and was appointed to associate professor in 2002. González's research focuses on understanding the structural, biochemical and cell biology mechanisms by which molecular signals control bacterial communication. His research has led to greater insights into how bacteria coordinate invasion and colonization of plants and animals. González's work has been recognized by numerous awards, including the Rittenberg Award for Outstanding Microbiology Graduate Research (1989), the Jane Coffin Childs Memorial Fund Postdoctoral Fellowship (1991–94), and the National Science Foundation Career Award (1997).

== See also ==
- List of Puerto Ricans
