= Pedro Gonçalves (disambiguation) =

Pedro Gonçalves (born 1998) is a Portuguese footballer

Pedro Gonçalves may refer to:

- Pepe Gonçalves (born 1993), full name Pedro Henrique Gonçalves da Silva, Brazilian slalom canoeist
- Pedro Gonçalves (football manager) (born 1976), Portuguese football manager
