= Juan Manuel González Torres =

Colombian politician

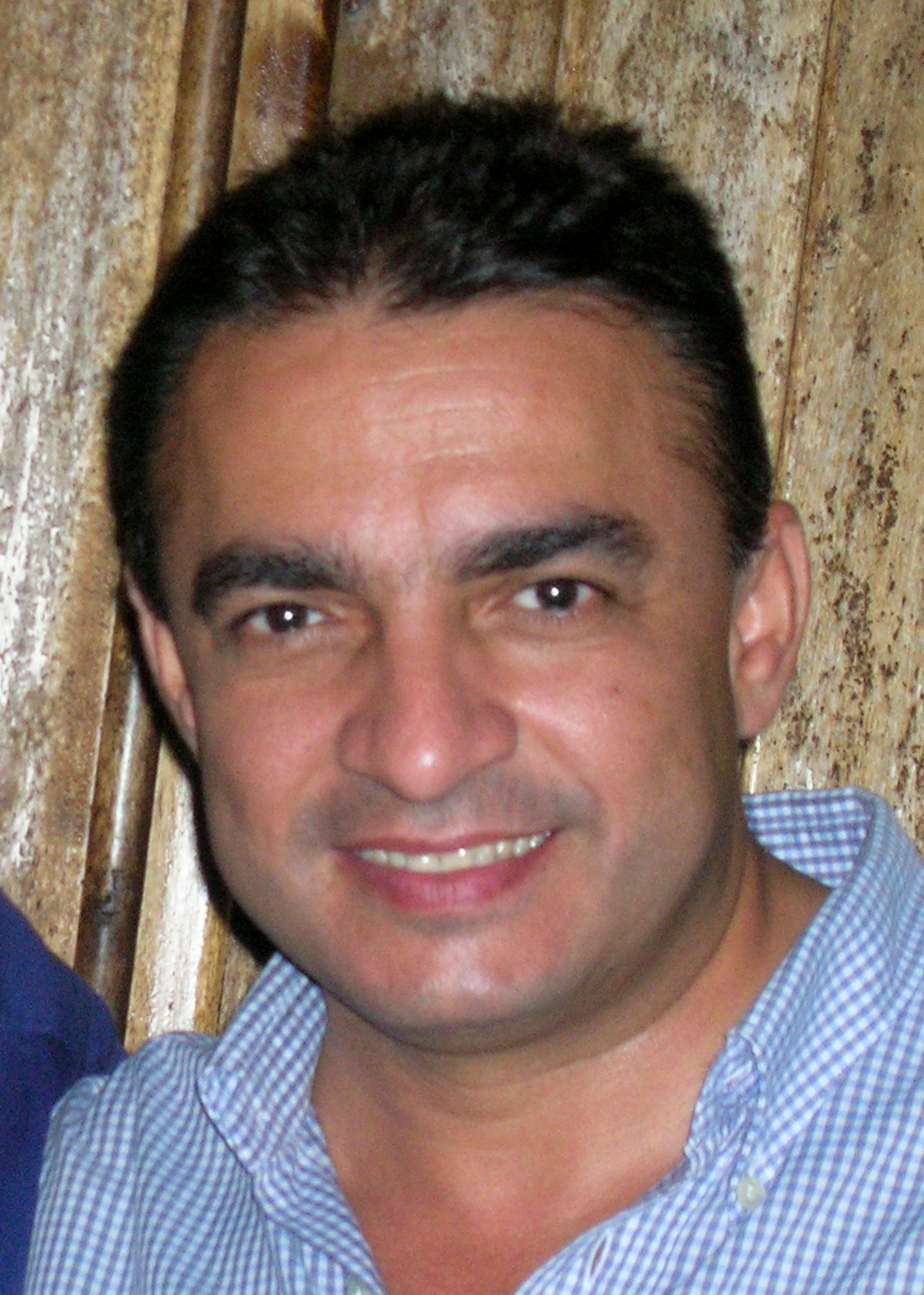
Torres in 2006

Juan Manuel González Torres is a Colombian politician. He served as governor of the Colombian department of Meta from 2006 until 2007.
