= Zack Peter =

American comedian (born 1993)

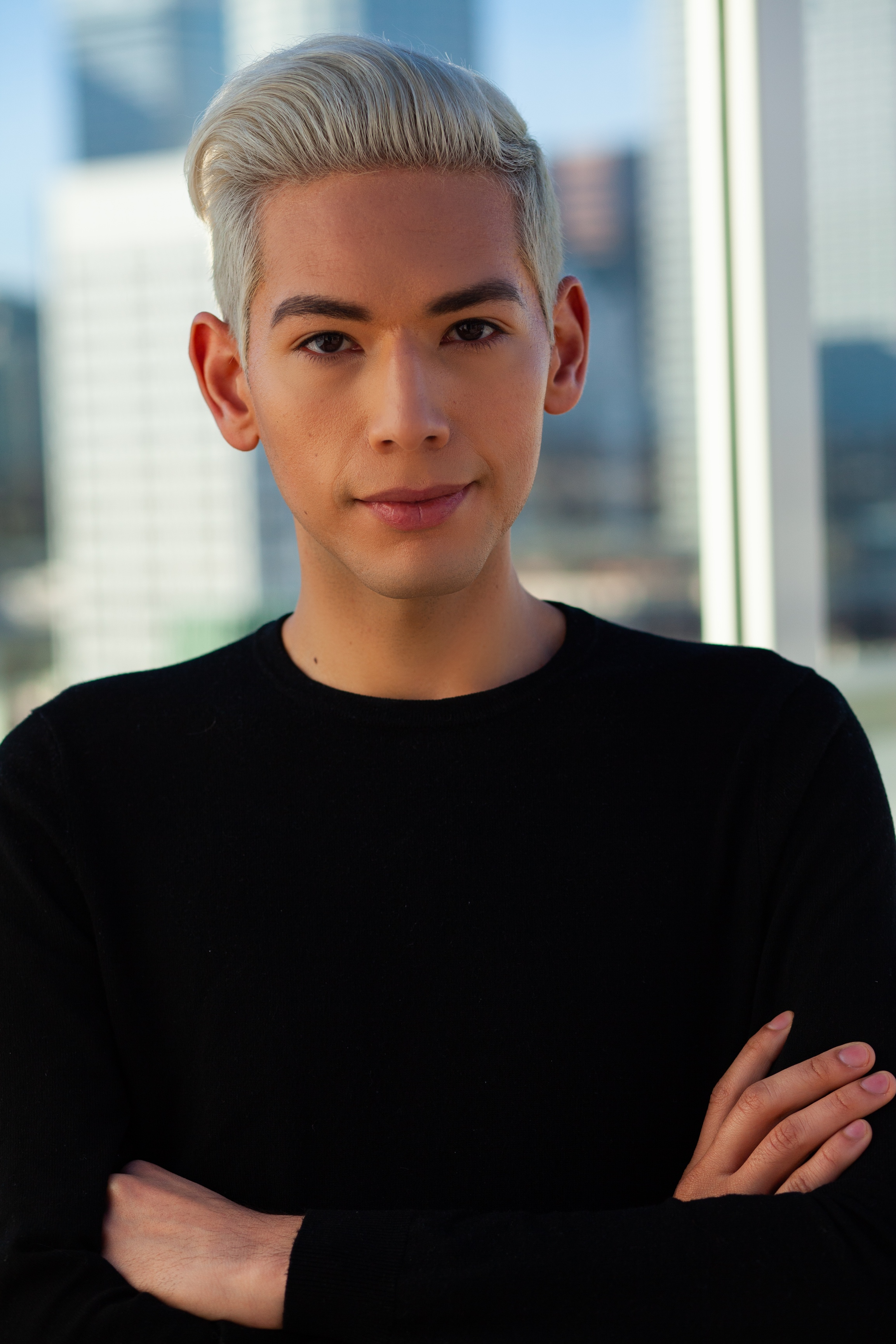
- Zack Peter in 2019
- Born: Peter Zachary Gonzalez; June 15, 1993 (age 32); Los Angeles, California, U.S.
- Other name: Zack Peter
- Occupations: Podcaster, comedian, writer/author
- Years active: 2009–present
- Website: Just Plain Zack

Peter Zachary Gonzalez (born June 15, 1993), known professionally as Zack Peter, is an American comedian, podcast host, writer, and activist. He first received recognition for his advocacy work for autism awareness. He has published a total of four books with bylines for PopSugar and Men's Health. He is best known as the host of the podcast, #NoFilter with Zack Peter. The podcast regularly ranks in the Top Shows in TV & Film on Apple Podcasts, and has gained additional popularity on YouTube.

In 2022, he joined Spotify's The Ringer network as a pop-culture podcast host.

== Early life ==
Peter grew up in Los Angeles, CA. His mother's name is Nancy. He has a total of six siblings, two from his mother's side (Elijah Joeb and Ethan) and four from his father's side.

== Career ==
=== Advocacy ===
In March 2009, Peter organized and hosted the first Play Now for Autism event. The fundraiser was a sports clinic for children with autism. The event raised over $2,000 which was donated to help autism research. Zack says that he started Play Now for Autism in honor of his younger brother with autism, Ethan, also known as "Deets."

Following Play Now for Autism, he then began hosting an internet talk-radio show, "it's on with Zack." The show started in July 2009 and ended in December 2011. On the show, Peter interviewed guests active in the autism community, covered recent news, and hosted debates.

In October 2009, his first book, Saving Deets!: A Family's Journey with Autism was released, which was later re-released in November 2010.

His advocacy efforts continued with events like Laugh Now for Autism, Rock Now for Autism, and his work with Jenny McCarthy's autism foundation, Generation Rescue, which he became executive director of in 2018. After nearly 10 years with the foundation, he ended his term in the summer of 2019.

=== Comedy ===
In 2011, Peter began performing stand-up comedy in Los Angeles, including at the Laugh Factory and The Comedy Store. He performed with comedians from Chelsea Handler’s late-night talk show on E!, Chelsea Lately at the 2011 Laugh Now for Autism benefit show. "

He hosted a YouTube series Just Plain Ridiculous with Zack and Ry from 2012 to 2013.

=== Literary ===
Zack has authored and self-published three books: Saving Deets!: A Family's Journey with Autism, Charity Bites!: The Untold Stories of the Dog-Eat-Dog World of Autism Activism, and When Life Hands You Lemons. . . Throw Them At People: A Book About Growing Up, Screwing Up, and Moving Up, with Just an Ounce of Maturity. His first book was published when he was sixteen, and his third when he was nineteen.

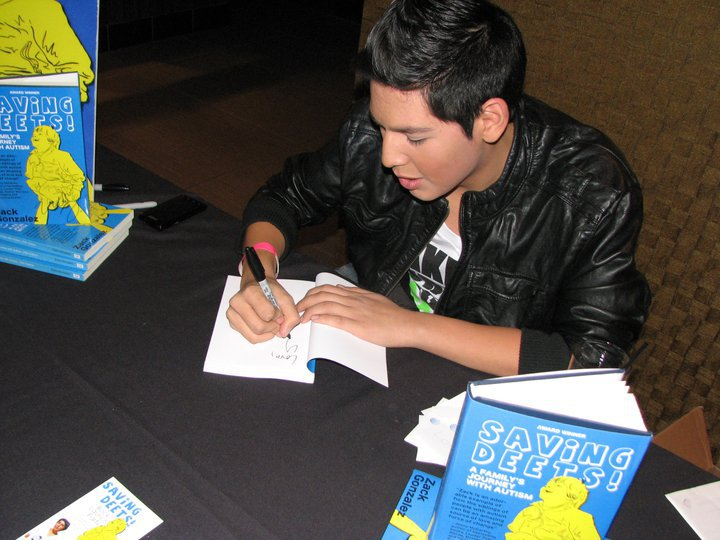
Zack Peter signing books at the Saving Deets! book launch in November 2010

His writing has also been featured on a variety of sites, including Conscious Magazine, POPSUGAR, and Men's Health.

His fourth book, A Shot Of Hope, was released in October 2014 with Skyhorse Publishing, and later sold to Simon and Schuster.

=== Podcasting ===
In April 2015, Peter began hosting "#NoFilter with Zack Peter", a pop-culture and reality TV news podcast. The show has been covered in a number of media publications and as of October 2022, has been featured on Bravo's Summer House, Vanderpump Rules, and The Real Housewives of Beverly Hills.

In May 2018, Peter began hosting "#Adulting", a wellness and lifestyle podcast with model Nikki Sharp and fashion influencer Abigail Fraher. The show concluded in May 2021. Guests ranged from medical experts like Mark Hyman M.D., Josh Axe D.C., Will Cole D.C., and Mike Varshavski D.O., to health and fitness leaders like trainer Jillian Michaels, Bulletproof founder Dave Asprey, brain coach Jim Kwik and more.

In September 2022, it was announced that Peter had joined Spotify's The Ringer network, hosting podcasts for The Ringer Dish and The Ringer Reality TV Podcast.

== Published works ==
- Saving Deets!: A Family's Journey with Autism (2009)
- Saving Deets!: A Family's Journey with Autism, Second Edition (2010)
- Charity Bites!: The Untold Stories of the Dog-Eat-Dog World of Autism Activism (2011)
- When Life Hands You Lemons. . . Throw Them At People! (2012)
- A Shot of Hope: Real Wisdom From a Real Sibling Warrior Providing Real Hope for Autism (2014)

== Filmography ==
=== Television ===
Title	Dates	Role	Notes
Prank My Mom	2012	Self	Zack and his mother were participants on the hidden camera show. Prank: "Match dot Mom"
DigiKiss	2019	Self	Zack was featured in a live-streamed blind-date on Adult Swim, which was later broadcast on Cartoon Network.
Phone Swap	2019	Self	Episode: "Zack and Frankie".
Summer House	2021	Self	Episode: "Kiss and Don't Tell"
Vanderpump Rules	2021	Self	Episode: "We're Back Baby".
Vanderpump Rules	2021	Self	Episode: "Pitch No-So-Perfect".
The Real Housewives of Beverly Hills	2022	Self	Episode: "Not My Sister's Keeper".

=== Web series ===
Title	Dates	Role	Notes
it's on with Zack	June 2011-November 2011	Host	Peter hosted, wrote, and produced the show. (8 Episodes)
Just Plain Ridiculous with Zack and Ry	October 2012-October 2013	Host	Peter hosted, wrote, and produced the show with musician Ry Matthews.

=== Radio/podcast ===
Title	Dates	Role	Notes
it's on with Zack	July 2009-December 2010	Host	Peter hosted and produced the radio broadcast. (18 Episodes)
#NoFilter with Zack Peter	April 2015-	Host	Peter hosts and produces the weekly podcast, covering pop-culture and reality TV news.
#Adulting: Life Hacks to Get Your Sh*t Together	May 2018 – 2021	Host	Peter hosted and produced the weekly podcast with wellness expert Nikki Sharp and Abigail Fraher.

== Awards ==
Year	Award	Category	Result	Notes
2009	MSAAFinc. Award	Young Hero's Literary Work of the Year	Won	Won for Saving Deets!
2009	Examiner.com Recognition	2009's Teens That Inspire	Won	Recognition (not official award)
2011	Association of Fundraising Professionals Award	Outstanding Youth Volunteer	Won	Nominated by Generation Rescue. Zack accepted the award in Los Angeles on November 16, 2011.
2013	WEGO Health Activist Award	Hilarious Health Activist	Nominated	Announced by WEGO Health on October 10, 2013; results pending.
