= Gonzalo Piermarteri =

Argentine footballer

Gonzalo Agustín Piermarteri (born 6 May 1995 in Córdoba, Argentina) is an Argentine footballer currently playing for Guillermo Brown.

== Teams ==
- (Argentina) Instituto de Córdoba 2012–2014
- (Chile) Rangers 2014
- (Italy) Catania 2014–2017
- (Argentina) Guillermo Brown 2017–2019
- (Italy) Cuneo 2019-
