= Gonsalves =

Gonsalves is an English-language variation of the Portuguese surname Gonçalves, meaning 'son of Gonçalo'.

People named Gonsalves include:

== Education ==
- Timothy A. Gonsalves (born 1954), Indian academician and entrepreneur
- Mary Emily Gonsalves (1919–2017), Pakistani Catholic nun who won the Sitara-e-Imtiaz for her services to education

== Entertainment ==
- June Gonsalves (c.1927–2018), British radio broadcaster
- Steve Gonsalves, star on the television series Ghost Hunters Academy
- Tell Father Gonsalves (1953), short story by Indian O. V. Vijayan
- Kartiki Gonsalves (Born 1986), Oscar winning Tamil Filmmaker

== Music ==
- Anthony Gonsalves (1927–2012), 1930s Indian music teacher/arranger
- Anthony Gonsalves, subject of 1977 Bollywood movie Amar Akbar Anthony
  - "My Name Is Anthony Gonsalves" (song) (1977), Bollywood song featured in Amar Akbar Anthony
    - My Name Is Anthony Gonsalves (film) (2007), based on the song
- Paul Gonsalves (1920–1974), American jazz musician
- Virgil Gonsalves (1931–2008), American jazz saxophonist (West Coast)

== Sports ==
- Andrew Gonsalves (born 1978), Guyanese cricketer
- Billy Gonsalves (1908–1977), American soccer player
- Courtney Gonsalves (1950–2013), Guyanese cricketer
- Jermaine Gonsalves (born 1976), British basketball player
- Stephen Gonsalves (born 1994), baseball player
- Vic Gonsalves (1887–1922), Dutch soccer player

== Other people ==
- Colin Gonsalves (born 1952), senior advocate of the Supreme Court of India
- Harold Gonsalves (1926–1945), United States marine and World War II Medal of Honor recipient
- Jacome Gonsalves (1676–1742), Goan missionary to Sri Lanka
- Ralph Gonsalves (born 1946), prime minister of Saint Vincent and the Grenadines
- Rob Gonsalves (1959–2017), Canadian painter
- Blaine M. Gonsalves, fictional name for the G.I. Joe character Knockdown from Battleforce 2000

== See also ==
- Gonçalves, Portuguese variation of Gonsalves
- Gonzalez (disambiguation), Spanish equivalent of Gonçalves
  - Gonsales, Portuguese variation of Gonzalez
  - Gonzales (disambiguation), Spanish variation of Gonzalez
- Gonsalvus of Spain (1255–1313), Spanish Franciscan theologian/scholastic philosopher
