= José Soberanis González =

Mexican politician

- Born: 15 February 1946 (age 80); Tixmucuy, Campeche, Mexico
- Occupation: Politician
- Political party: PRI

José del Carmen Soberanis González (born 15 February 1946) is a Mexican politician from the Institutional Revolutionary Party. From 2000 to 2003 he served as a federal deputy of the LVIII Legislature of the Mexican Congress representing Campeche, and previously served as a local deputy in the LIII Legislature of the Congress of Campeche.
