= Pedro González (footballer, born 1970) =

Argentine footballer

Pedro González Pierella
Personal information
- Full name: Pedro Enrique González Pierella
- Date of birth: December 24, 1970 (age 55)
- Place of birth: Buenos Aires, Argentina
- Height: 1.74 m (5 ft 8 1/2 in)
- Position: Winger

Youth career
- Newell's Old Boys

Senior career*
Years	Team	Apps	(Gls)
1991	UE Lleida		
1992–1994	Atlético Morelia		
1995–1996	Provincial Osorno	56	(17)
1997	Boca Juniors		
1997	Deportivo Español		
1998	Huachipato	29	(10)
1999	Deportes Concepción	37	(4)
2000	Unión Española	7	(0)
2000–2001	CD Badajoz		
2001	Nacional		
2002	Palestino	3	(0)
- * Club domestic league appearances and goals

Pedro Enrique González Pierella (born 24 December 1970 in Buenos Aires, Argentina) is a retired Argentinian professional footballer.

Pedro González began his professional career with UE Lleida (Spanish Segunda División), and then he played for several clubs during his career, in Mexico, Chile, Argentina, Spain, and Uruguay.
