= Convent of São Gonçalo (Angra do Heroísmo) =

- Convento do São Gonçalo
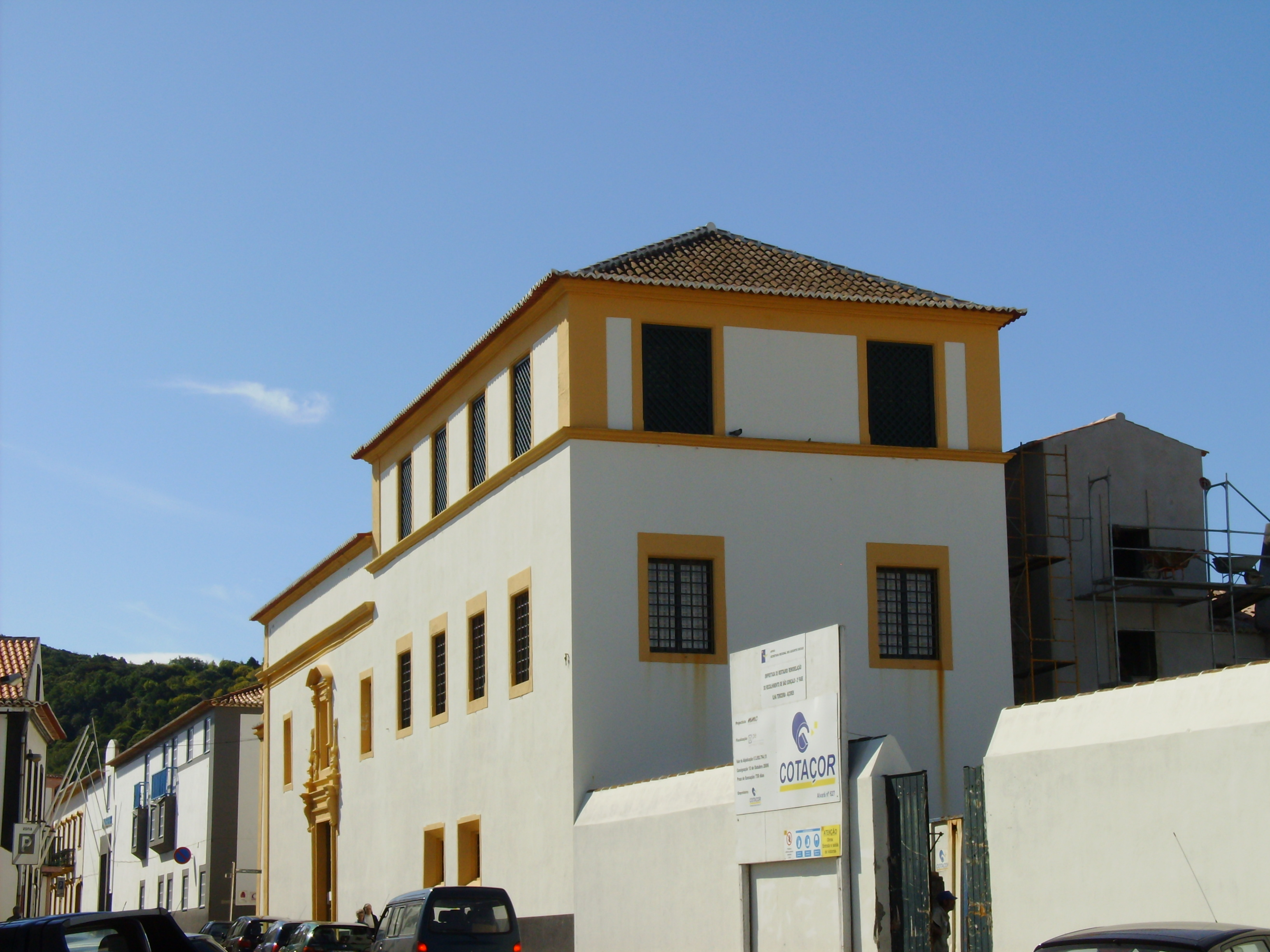
- The exterior facade, showing the main church block, alongside the convent

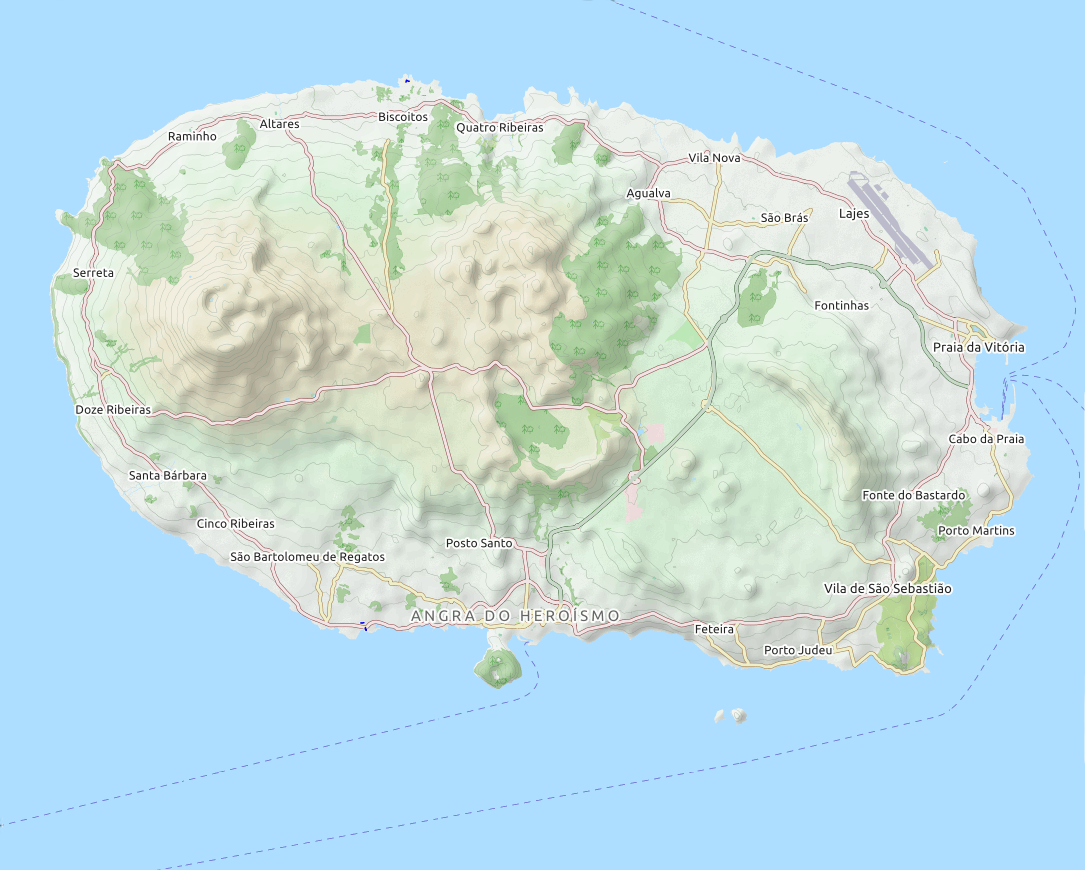
- Location within Terceira

General information
- Type: Convent
- Architectural style: Baroque
- Location: Sé, Angra do Heroísmo, Portugal
- Coordinates: 38°39′17.28″N 27°13′23.71″W
- Opened: 1542
- Owner: Portuguese Republic

Technical details
- Material: Stone

Design and construction
- Architect: Brás Pires do Canto

The Convent of São Gonçalo is a Baroque-era convent and church in the historical centre of the city of Angra, civil parish of Sé, municipality of Angra do Heroísmo on the Portuguese island of Terceira, in the Azores.

It is considered one of the oldest convents in the archipelago, historically housing hundreds of Clarisse sisters, and boasting a reputation for education and fine arts in the Azores, that included classes in music, choral, design, painting and the humanities.

== History ==
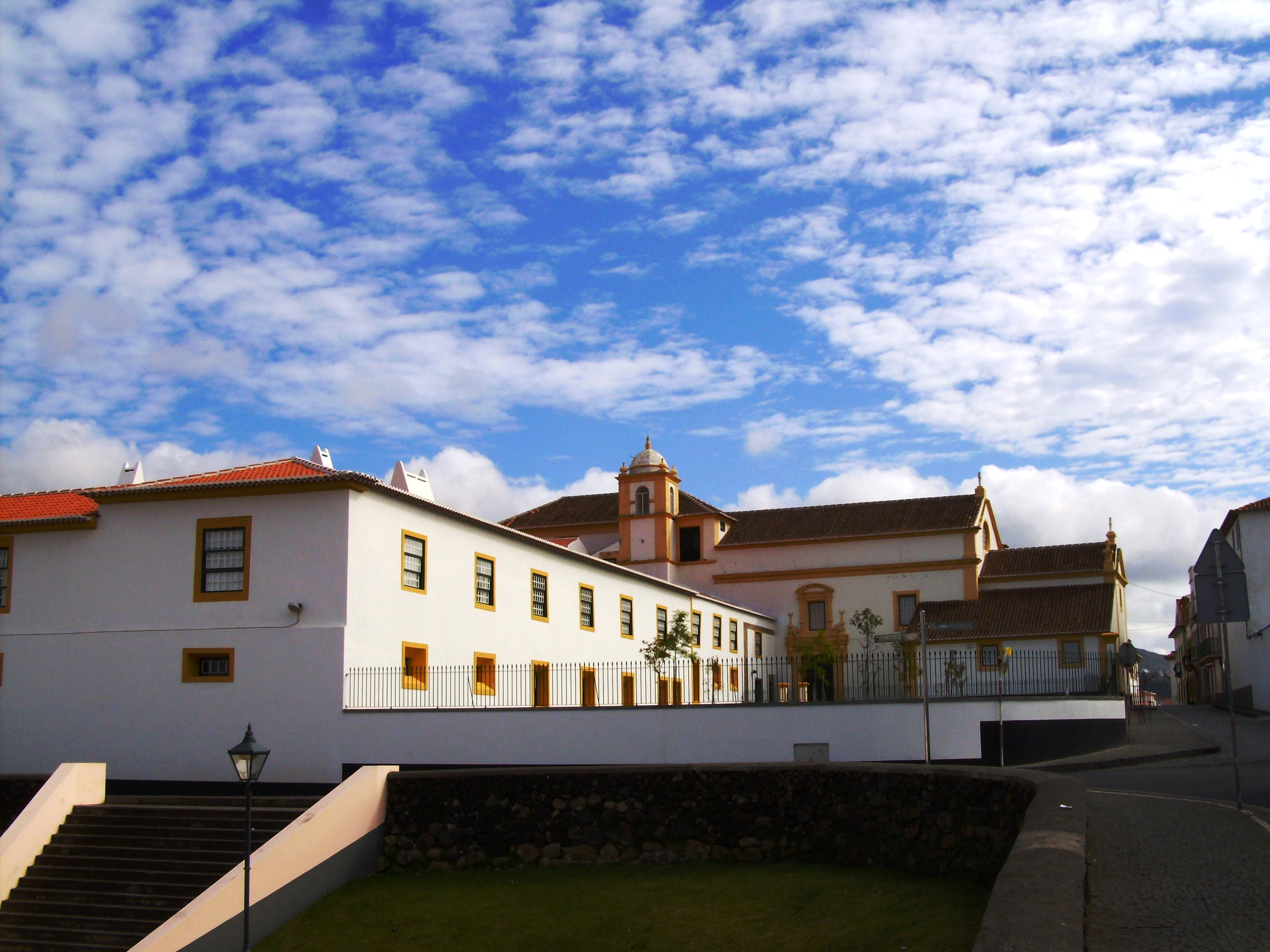
The main Convent alongside the Church of São Gonçalo, showing their close proximity

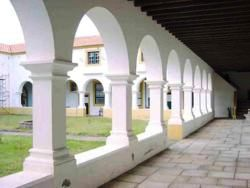
The colonnade of the interior cloister at the Convent of São Gonçalo

The establishment of the convent dates to 1542, when Brás Pires do Canto obtained a papal bull from Pope Paul III to authorize the first construction of a convent for the Sisters of Angra. Destined for the contemplative order of Poor Clares it was there that Brás Pires do Canto helped collect his two daughters who had followed the order and one whom eventually became the first abbess.

The growth in the number of novices during the 16th and 17th centuries resulted in the expansion of the primitive installations, which today represents the location of the church. Remnants of this church, oriented towards the east, can still be seen in the vestiges integrated into the walls of the southern cloister. After its expansion, the new church was consecrated at the end of the 17th century, although its interior decorations were not completed until the following century. In 1793, a new organ was commissioned and installed by António Xavier Machado e Cerveira. The Church of Gonçalo de Amarante was inaugurated in 1776, sheltering the ancient Irmandade de Nossa Senhora da Boa Morte e Assunção (Sisterhood of Our Lady of Good Death and Assumption), an venerable order.

During the Liberal Wars, the arrival of Liberal forces caused great fury, illustrated by the Marquess of Fronteira, who affirmed: "...here everyone had a courtship...", implying that many sisters were tempted or fell victim to the soldiers. This included, specifically, Teotónio de Ornelas Bruges Paim da Câmara and, supposedly, Pedro IV of Portugal himself, all these facts were not verified.

Following the extinction of the religious orders, after 10 May 1832, the Convent was the unique one to survive, receiving many of the Sisters from many of the surrounding islands.

At the end of the 19th century, the cloister was damaged by an earthquake, resulting in the necessary substitution of Tuscan columns and arches in the eastern part with pilasters.

As a result of the 1 January 1980 Azores earthquake, much of the convent and grounds were damaged or scarred.

It was classified as a Property of Public Interest (Portuguese: Imóvel de Interesse Público under decree 516/71, on 22 November 1971, a classification that was included in group of buildings making part of the Historical Centre of Angra do Heroísmo, under resolution 41/80, 11 June 1980.

A project to remodel the southern wing of the cloister was studied in 2005 by the Gabinete da Zona Classificada, but much of the budget was lost in this study, and not the actual work to restore the building. In July 2006, the third phase of the restoration of the convent and cloister was begun, under the direction of architect Miguel Cunha, who created rooms for the treatment and care of seniors and formal residences for members of the convent.

== Architecture ==
The site consists of two cloisters, church (with high and low choirs) in the Baroque and convent, considered the best examples of the architecture in the archipelago, during the reign of King John V.

=== Interior ===
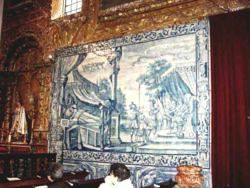
Part of the panel of azulejo tile in the Church of São Gonçalo, showing the story of Joseph

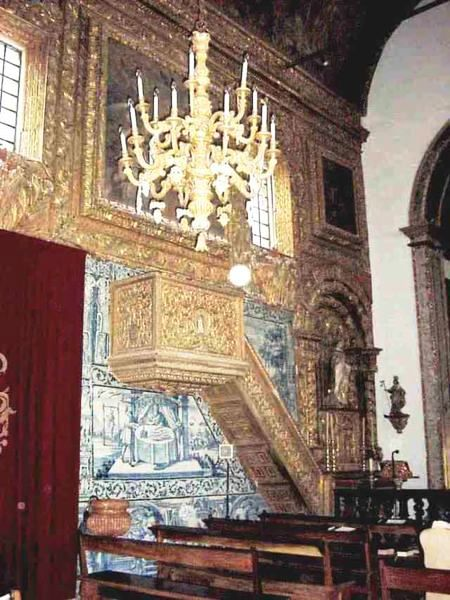
The lateral facade showing the gilded wood pulpit and azulejo tile decorating the interior of the Church

Three gab s, two grilles and a wheel, allow contact between the novices and the community.

The lower choir of the church is covered in slabs marked with the names of the sisters that were interred in the temple, with a processional image of Senhor dos Passos (Lord of Hosts) along the grid. The high choir is covered in gilded wood that permeates the structure, while the walls of the oratory (similarly covered in religious iconography) is covered in silver, likely retrieved from the old Convent of Jesus in Praia da Vitória, when the religious orders were extinguished. In the high choir are the choir stalls (or stacidia) of the congregation, with carved armrests consisting of mythical figures (including gryphons and chimeras). Within choir oculus are also a chinoiserie, a 17th-century organ and an exotic wood armoire.

In the chancel's presbytery, in the Rococo style, there is a 16th-century sculpture of the Crucificado como Divino Imperador(Crucified as Divine Emperor) with a crown and sceptre in silver, over a silver-covered filigree cross, possibly attributed to Spanish or South American sculptors. In the niches of the prebystery are 17th-century images of Saint Francis of Assisi and his sister Saint Clare of Assisi.

Paintings from the 18th century, framed in gilded-wood, flank each side of the altar: including to the right of the altar, the Menino entre os Doutores(Finding in the Temple), the Fuga para o Egipto (Flight into Egypt) and the Apresentação no Templo (Presentation of Jesus at the Temple); and to the left of the altar, the Visitação (Visitation), the Anunciação pelo Anjo (Annunciation) and the Casamento da Virgem (Marriage of the Virgin), located. The pulpit also in gilded wood, and its small staircase, is within the interior of the nave.

The 17th-century decoration is also represented in the azulejo tile, attributed to José Meço and Teotónio dos Santos, disciple of António Bernardes, who completed their projects between 1720 and 1730. The four panels represent the story of Joseph (son of Jacob), starting from the left of the altar with Joseph and his flock, Joseph and his brothers, the well where he was imprisoned and the revelation to his father (Jacob); while to the right of the altar, the Pharoh's dream and Joseph's interpretation, while the last panel shows Joseph's triumph in Egypt. On the floor slab, close to the grid is a tombstone, sculpted in marble relief.
