= Marco González =

Chilean footballer (born 1986)

Personal information
- Full name: Marco Antonio González Heredia
- Date of birth: 26 May 1986 (age 40)
- Place of birth: Punta Arenas, Chile
- Height: 1.78 m (5 ft 10 in)
- Position: Striker

Youth career
- 2002–2006: Universidad Católica

Senior career*
Years	Team	Apps	(Gls)
2006–2009	Universidad Católica	5	(1)
2007	→ Unión San Felipe (loan)		
2008	→ Deportes Ovalle		(15)
2008	→ Coquimbo Unido	5	(0)
- * Club domestic league appearances and goals

Marco Antonio González Heredia (born 26 May 1986) is a Chilean former footballer.

He played as a forward for Coquimbo Unido.
