= Alberto González (humorist) =

Cuban-born American humorist and iconoclast

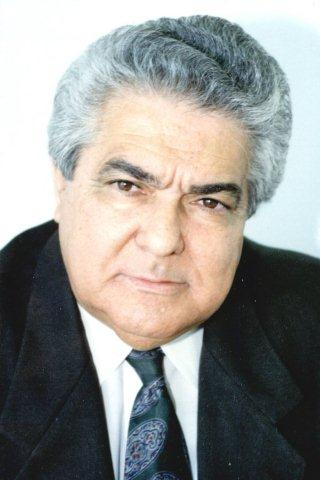
- Born: September 17, 1928; Guanabacoa, Cuba
- Died: September 23, 2012 (aged 84); Miami, Florida
- Occupations: Writer, journalist, scriptwriter
- Website: www.albertogonzalez-politicalsatirehumorist.com

Alberto González (September 17, 1928 – September 23, 2012) was a humorist and iconoclast; known for his biting political satire and popular comedy shows, he was a prolific writer, journalist, and scriptwriter during a career that spanned sixty years in show business. Alberto González was born in Guanabacoa, Cuba, in 1928.

González died on September 23, 2012, at the age of 84 in Miami, Florida.

== Career ==
Alberto González became a well-known radio show humorist by 1952 in Cuba. He found serendipitous acclaim in Colombian radio in the early 1960s and continued his career as a humorist on television and various entertainment productions during seventeen years in Puerto Rico from the mid-1960s to the late 1970s. He brought sold-out political and social satire comedies to the Miami stage during the 1980s. He ambitiously started and failed at several businesses and newspapers, including controversial political satire radio shows in the 1990s. At 81 years old, he wrote his final comedy and satire shows in 2009 for a new audience thanks to Radio Marti broadcasts to Cuba. Yet, much of the written history of these creative shows has not always given him credit for his penmanship - a fact he knew about why radio and television writers risk oblivion: "writers are not the ones in front of the audience."

=== Cuba ===
Alberto González wrote his first comic script titled "Madera de Comerciante" (Merchant by Vocation) with Adolfo Otero and Mario Galí for the radio show Teatro Del Pueblo (The People's Theater) in RHC-Cadena Azul in La Habana on September 1, 1949, at the age of 21.

Cuba's legendary radio station, CMQ later hired him to be a staff writer in the social satire of the day created by Antonio Castells, Chicharito y Sopeira with the hilarious duo of Alberto Garrido in blackface and Federico Piñeiro as a Galician-born immigrant that pulled for rival baseball teams and became known in Cuba as "the Aces of Laughter". According to Rine Leal's 1982 book on the history of Cuban Theater, Cuban comedies derived much of their lively situations from Cuban musical theater genre was known as Bufo Theater and usually involved three main stock characters, a black man, a Spaniard and a mulatto woman in situations varying from lighthearted to ribald that became typical social signifiers in Cuban culture and music.

He also was a staff writer in the popular show created in 1942 by Zig-Zag magazine co-founder Cástor Vispo titled "La Tremenda Corte" (Shaking Before the Court) with the beloved comic Leopoldo Fernández and Mimí Cal as "Nananina". He also created and wrote the popular radio and television shows La Taberna de Pedro (Pedro's Tavern), featuring the antics of "Salmoyedo", and Frente a La Calle (Facing the Street) that aired in Cuba during the decade of the 1950s. The new medium of television gave his comedy and social satire great appeal with the audience. After 1959, he worked with the newspaper El Diario de la Marina to defy openly the military take-over by Fidel Castro, for which he was censured and jailed. After a hard year in prison, he was fortunate to leave the island in 1961 thanks to the intercessions of his second wife, Consuelo Luque, who was a British subject.

=== Colombia ===
Later, the format of his show "La Taberna de Pedro" became the number one radio show hit in Bogotá, Colombia, by Radio Caracol titled El Cafe de Montecristo featuring the zany comedian Guillermo Zuluaga as "Montecristo" which was González's first successful show in exile after leaving Cuba in 1961. As a humorist, he helped popularize Colombian folk stock characters with the realism of his comedy of manners style, honed in Cuban radio and television. Unbeknownst to him, CMQ had sold his radio show scripts to Radio Caracol. The sheer coincidence of the writer meeting up with his scripts in another country at random could only be described as serendipity. It surprised yet aided him to undergo his expatriation from Cuba with dignity and bring his parents and sibling from Cuba.

=== Puerto Rico ===
Yearning for a return to his Caribbean roots, González repurposed the format of his show "La Taberna de Pedro" for television, which became the popular situation comedy show called "La Taberna India" in San Juan, Puerto Rico circa 1963. The show featured the beloved Puerto Rican comedian Adalberto Rodríguez, best known for his endearing characterization of a jíbaro (a self-subsistence farmer) named "Machuchal" in what constitutes one of the earliest local productions for Puerto Rican television.

González's skill as a humorist helped pioneer Puerto Rican television and provided laughter for his audience and years of work with great colleagues, actors, producers and directors. Adapting his Bufo Theater stock characters, he created works at "La Taberna India" in WAPA-TV's Channel 4 such as Paquito Cordero's blackface "Reguerete", Adalberto Rodríguez's "Tiburcio Pérez", Elín Ortíz's Spaniard "Reliquia", Luis Vigoreaux's "Meneito", Ramón Rivero's "Diplo", Efraín Berríos's "Pan Doblao" Ofelia Dacosta, Amparo Ribelles, Maribella García, Delia Esther Quiñones, Gilda Galán's "Doña Estelvina Tru-Tru", and the fantastic comedian René Rubiella's "Findingo Lenguamuerta".

In 1968, he also pioneered political satire writing the hit television show "Se Alquilan Habitaciones" (Rooms for Rent), featuring Gilda Galán in WAPA-TV's Channel 4. According to Margarita Babb's article in one of Puerto Rico's mainstream Spanish newspapers at the time, El Mundo, when the Director of Programming tried to censure the controversial show, González resigned in outrage over freedom of speech infringement. Over the years, his wife Consuelo helped him manage and develop their first television production agency called Raditel in 1968, and they created several artistic, cultural and philanthropic enterprises such as an improvisational folkloric troubadour competition, a beauty pageant and weekend retreats for poor children at El Conquistador Resort.

By December 1, 1972, Jack Curtiss article on the Playback section of the San Juan Star described the Gonzalez and Galan political satire team as frequently censured and moving from one TV Channel to another, including a version in English in Channel 18 titled Marunga Times, González' political satire show "Se Alquilan Habitaciones" deployed a troupe of actors imitating local politicians in humorous satirical exploits of current events to great effect and ratings with an intensely political-minded general audience. The show became a boom for yesteryear radio impresario Rafael Pérez Perry's television Channel 11, featuring Gilda Galán's "Marunga" and her foil, Delia Esther Quiñones. The show's cast included veteran Puerto Rican actors such as Victor Arrillaga, who mastered a lifelike television imitation of the beloved Puerto Rican politician Luis Muñiz Marín as well as new talent and regulars such as René Rubiella in new characters like the effeminate stock character "Avelino Plumón"(A Bird with Huge Feathers) among others. The show encountered serious and continuous political blow back as it made equal-opportunity political satire with either of the two main political parties that were in power.

González helped usher new talent to the television medium in Puerto Rico such as director Mario Pabón, actor Fernando Hidalgo, Juan Manuel Lebrón, Pepe Yedra, and old guard comedians like Normita Suarez, Tito Hernández, and Luis Echegoyen as "Mamacusa Alambrito." In the 1968, González' screenplay becomes the Puerto Rican film satire El Derecho de Comer (The Right to Eat) as "Findingo Lenguamuerta" with the popular singer Lissette Alvarez. The storyline plays off the successful Cuban radio soap-opera remade into the acclaimed Mexican television soap opera El Derecho de Nacer (The Right to be Born). The seventeen-year period from 1963 to 1980 in Puerto Rico would be his most wide-ranging creative years encompassing television, film and stage productions.

González's eye for folklore and popular culture created other entertainment features like a farcical take on "Fiddler on the Roof" titled "El Pianista en el Tejado" on stage; a prime time soap opera "La Colina de los Siete Vientos" (The Windy Bluff); the popular beauty pageant "La Reina de los Pueblos"(Queen of the Town Beauty Pageant); and, a noon variety show "El Batey de la Alegria" (The Happiness Hut), featuring great folkloric talents like Maso Rivera playing his traditional musical instrument, the Cuatro, in an improvisational competition of Caribbean folk music known as "décimas" that had not been deemed "commercial" enough by television executives. For a brief time, González returned to journalism when he reopened and edited "El Imparcial" newspaper in Old San Juan, Puerto Rico with no commercial success.

=== Miami ===
In the early 1980s, González moved to Miami hoping to do film and created "Moon Seventy Pictures". Instead, he found a better opportunity by producing a string of political satire theatrical performances featuring comedian Armando Roblán portraying an increasingly frustrated Fidel Castro on stage in "No Hay Mal Que Dure Cien Años, Ni Pueblo Que Lo Resista" (No Illness last a Century, or People that Could Stand It) "El Partido Se Partió" (The Party with a Limp Wrist) where he foretold that Castro's brother Raul would take over for him, and, after years working together, they separated and Roblan created his own popular play En los 90, Fidel Revienta (In the '90s, Fidel if Finished) as a spinoff. He wrote and produced the theatrical comedy of manners A Vicente Le Llegó Un Pariente(Vicente Had to House a Relative) parlaying the current events of the Mariel boatlift to humorous effect on stage, showing many of the prejudices and misreadings toward the new batch of Cuban exiles in Miami. This hit play ran Tuesday to Sunday at "Teatro America" (later renamed "Teatro Bellas Artes") with sold-out shows that broke all ticket sales records in Miami, and later it was also presented in Tampa, Union City and Puerto Rico.

González teamed up with veteran theatrical talent such as famed Cuban director Ramón Antonio Crusellas, singer Irene Farach, and Cuban stage doyenne, Mary Munnet, to bring his only musical as an homage to Cuban Diva Rita Montaner, where his daughter, actress Maribel González, made her stage debut, launched a career in television, film and theater, and has become known as "the enemy of sadness" (La enemiga de la tristeza). He also teamed up with veteran entertainers Normita Suarez, Luis Echegoyen, Tito Hernández, 'Manolo Coego and cultivated new talent like Luis Rivas Jr, Eddie Calderón, Gilberto Reyes, among others.

In 1982, González opened the short-lived Spanish-language daily newspaper El Mundo that nearly bankrupted him, but he continued over the years to establish various short-lived weekly newspapers without commercial success and with grave consequences for his reputation by leaving an increasing string of disgruntled creditors. González did not return to stage or printed press successfully. By April 2, 1984, El Nuevo Herald's journalist Norma Niurca documented some of the frequent controversies, described previous shows and reported the start of a new radio show titled after his earlier work in Puerto Rico, "Se Alquilan Habitaciones", a reprise of his 1981 show "La Silla Caliente" (The Hot Seat)

In 1989, González created another hit political satire radio show named La Mogolla (The Mess), but his aptitude blowing the proverbial raspberry at Miami politicians and public figures landed him in constant controversies and commercial censure. On July 29, 1992, El Nuevo Herald journalist Joel Gutierrez's article reported that Gonzalez publicly accused the Cuban American Foundation of a commercial blockade and sabotaging their advertising. Gonzalez also rallied against Miami City Hall's proposed change of name from the eponymous area of Little Havana to Latin Quarter, creating many enemies. Like previously, his shows were frequently canceled and started in the various radio stations for several years in the 1990s.

In spite of his documented failures in business, he continued to be successful in his writing as a humorist. González was also political speech writer, who helped many local politicians. The well-known entrepreneur and friend Felipe Valls supported his work, and González was seen often hanging out at Versailles Restaurant until 2011.

González worked with Radio Martí, where his political satire programme La República de la Cigüatera (The Republic of Fish Poison Illness Ciguatera) and other comedic sketches were broadcast into Cuba for the first time in decades. His career spanned more than sixty years across radio, television, theatre and journalism, and included both entertainment and political commentary. His television and satirical work has been compared by some writers to that of American television producer Norman Lear.

== External links and sources ==
- The Alberto González Papers at University of Miami Cuban Heritage Collection
- The Museum of Broadcasting – Puerto Rico TV Profile
- Fundacion Nacional Para La Cultura Popular, Puerto Rico (Puerto Rican National Foundation for Popular Culture Website)
- Cuban Theater Organization
- Alberto Gonzalez Memorial Video on YouTube
