= Los Chichos =

Spanish band from the 1970s

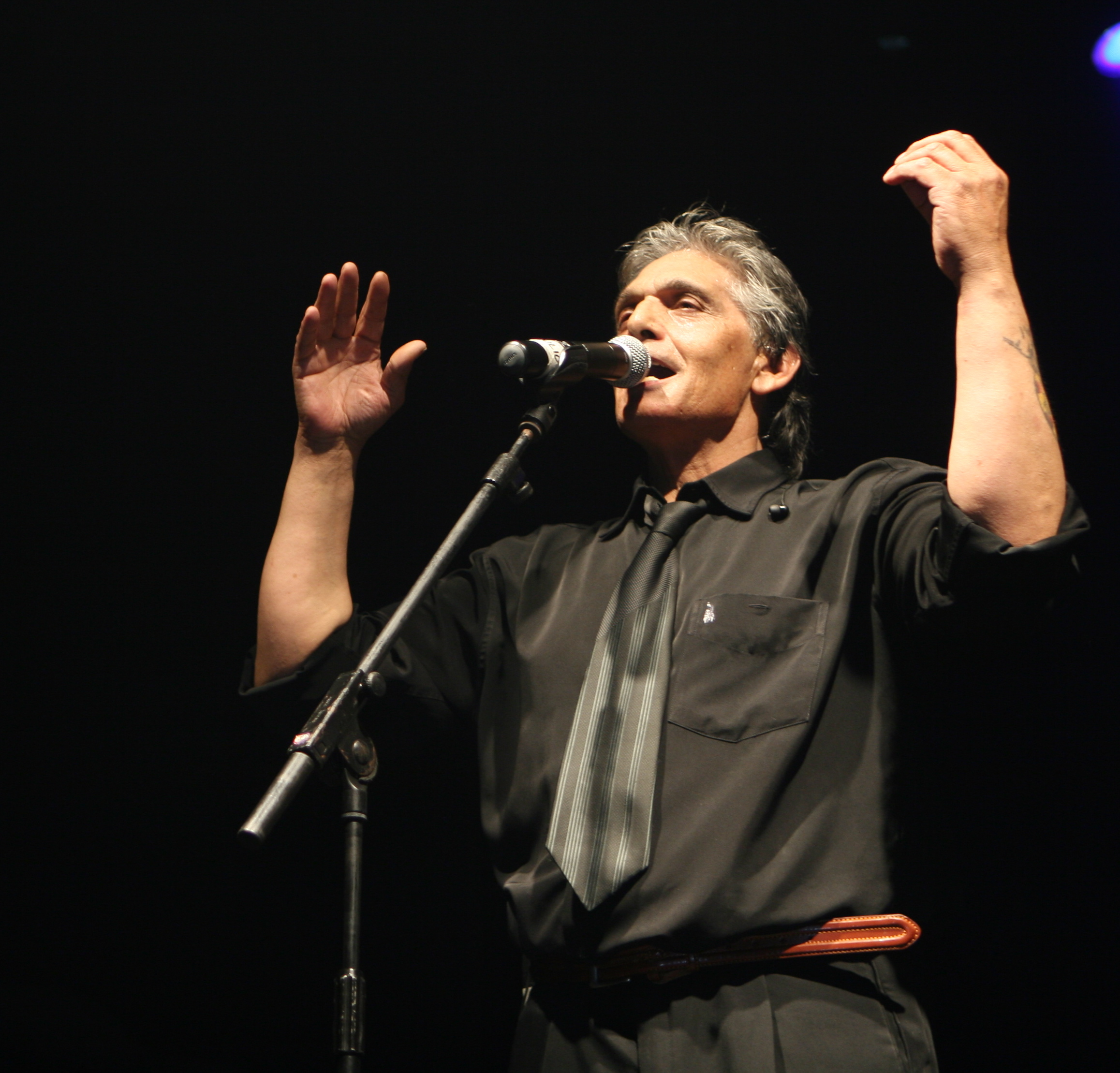
- Los Chichos in the Sala Razzmatazz, Barcelona

Background information
- Origin: Madrid, Spain
- Genres: Rumba flamenca
- Years active: 1973–2008
- Label: Phonogram
- Members: Emilio González Gabarre; Julio González Gabarre; Emilio González García
- Past members: Juan Antonio Jiménez Muñoz
- Website: los-chichos.com

Los Chichos is a Spanish band that was formed in the mid-1970s by singer-songwriter Juan Antonio Jiménez and brothers Julio and Emilio González. The band reached its peak popularity in the 1980s and restructured in 1990 when Jiménez began his solo career. Los Chichos has sold 15 million records, making it one of the best-selling Spanish groups in history. They performed the popular rumba flamenca in the vein of Los Chunguitos.

== History ==
=== Formation ===
Emilio and Julio González were born to a family of twelve brothers from Madrid who had migrated to La Mancha seeking work. Emilio left the countryside for Salamanca to pursue a job as a musician with friends the Farina brothers. Subsequently Emilio and his brother, Julio, moved to Madrid where they played guitar at different inns. During one performance Emilio met Eduardo Guervós, a band and club manager who oversaw the nightclub Discoteca Lover Club, which was owned by Ángel Nieto and located in Vallecas.

Guervós became the González brothers' manager and began securing shows for them around Spain. They made their performance in Vigo, at Sala Nuevo Electra. The owner recommended that the group add another member and Julio asked Juan Antonio Jiménez Muñoz, known by the stage name "Jero", to play with them.

In Madrid, they continued to attend different shows and meet other musicians, including guitarist Antonio Sánchez, father of Paco de Lucía, and Pedro Cordero. Antonio invited the brothers to make a demo at his recording studio, Fonogram. During this session they recorded their biggest hit "Quiero ser libre" (I want to be free). The song had been written by 19-year-old Jero while he was serving a brief jail sentence.

=== Early years ===
Los Chichos became pioneers of the rumba flamenca music movement. They were signed by Philips Records and, at the end of 1973, began releasing their first singles. There was a remix by Joseph Torregrossa, who helped create the group's unique sound: rumba-rock featuring a powerful bass line, percussion and an orchestra with a horn section. Their music also showcased their unique voices and sensitivity, with lyrics inspired by working-class neighborhoods dealing with drugs and crime. Jero wrote all of the songs.

The Chichos first three albums were a milestone in the Spanish pop-rock space. For their fourth album they incorporated synth sounds which were then popular at clubs. In 1979, with their sixth album, Amor y Ruleta (Love and Roulette), the Chichos returned to fast-paced rumba-rock. They promoted this release with many TV appearances which boosted album sales and concert attendance.

=== Peak and decline ===
The group were a Spanish musical phenomenon of the 1980s. Their album Bailarás con alegría (You Will Dance with Joy) quickly became one of the most famous of their career. Synthesizers and avant-garde techno arrangements replaced the orchestra on their LP Adelante. In 1985 they released the soundtrack for the movie Yo, El Vaquilla, which was an immediate success.

However as popular music became more heterogeneous, Los Chichos began to lose popularity. Internal strife and drug problems led to the departure of Jero. His final contribution to the group was to their double live album.

=== Restructured ===
The González brothers reformed the group with the addition of Emilio's son, Junior, the new line-up debuting at the amusement park Montjuïc in 1991. However, the quality of the trio suffered and their first three albums were not as successful.

Meanwhile, Jero produced two mediocre albums distributed by cassettes stations. Although still an admired and respected musician he committed suicide in 1995, shocking fans and colleagues. Years later his son Chaboli, who was also a musician, paid tribute to his father through his music.

Fans of Chicane ("chicheros") continued to support Los Chichos and buy their albums. In 2000 the group reissued a compilation album that reached the top of the charts. The next year they released Ladrón de Amores, which achieved gold certification. The group released Cabibi in 2002 with similar success. In 2009 they released El Amor deja sentencia, which became one of the most-popular Spanish-language albums of all time.

== Musical style ==
The group's musical style is the flamenco and rumba combined with the fandango and pop. Joseph Torregrossa was the creator of this flamenco-pop genre. Bands such as Las Grecas, Los Chunguitos, Los Chorbos, Perlita de Huelva and Tow were leading flamenco-pop groups. Rumba flamenca is also inspired by other musical styles such as Catalan rumba, rock, soul and funk.

The group's musical evolution can be divided into five stages:

- 1973–1977 with Ni más, ni menos to Son ilusiones. This period is considered to be their most successful.
- 1978–1983 with Mala Ruina Tengas to Déjame Solo. This period featured great creativity and maturity for the group, reaching its peak with Amor de Compra y Venta in 1980.
- 1984–1985, with albums Adelante and Yo, El Vaquilla. It was a period of great artistic success.
- 1986–1990, their period of decline, featuring album Ojos Negros.
- 1990–present, rebirth, releases of greatest hits compilations.

=== Instrumentation ===
The result of combining the rumba-flamenco and pop with Torregrossa arrangements produced varied instrumentation, combining the modern and traditional, with drums, guitars, classical strings, bass guitar and wind instruments. The group incorporated additional instruments in successive stages including piano, synthesizers and percussion.

In addition to vocals by members of the group, Los Chichos featured throughout their albums a vocal trio of González sisters Nieves, Mari and Isabel. They also incorporated choirs and Roma female singers in select songs.

=== Songwriting ===
Jero was the most prolific and notable songwriter of the group. He composed all of their material from 1973 until 1976. While Jero was not a trained musician, he had innate talent and musical sensibility. He composed the group's successful singles including "Ni mas, ni menos", "Quiero ser libre" and "Te vas, me dejas" from the first album.

In 1977 the Gonzalez brothers began contributing more songs, initially with the help of H. Humanes. The group decided that Jero would contribute four songs per album and the other members would contribute three.

From 1990 most of the group's songs were written by the Gonzalez brothers. Junior also began contributing, especially for the Gitano album. The group's most-popular song after Jero left was "Nieve", written by popular musician Queco.

== Members ==
First line-up, 1973–1990:

- Juan Antonio Jiménez Muñoz "Jero" – Spanish guitar and vocals
- Emilio Gonzalez Gabarre – guitar, lead and backing vocals
- Julio González Gabarre – guitar, lead and backing vocals

Reformed line-up, 1991–present:

- Emilio Gonzalez Gabarre – guitar, lead and backing vocals
- Julio Gonzalez Gabarre – guitar, lead and backing vocals
- Emilio "Junior" Gonzalez Garcia – lead and backing vocals

== Discography ==
Albums, original line-up:

- Ni más, Ni menos (1974)
- Esto sí que tiene guasa (1975)
- No sé por qué (1976)
- Son Ilusiones (1977)
- Hoy Igual que Ayer (1978)
- Amor y Ruleta (1979)
- Amor de Compra y Venta (1980)
- Bailarás con alegría (1981)
- Ni tú ni yo (1982)
- Déjame Solo (1983)
- Adelante (1984)
- Yo, el Vaquilla (1985)
- Porque nos Queremos (1987)
- Ojos Negros (1988)
- Esto es lo que hay (1989)

Albums, reformed line-up:

- Sangre gitana (1991)
- ¡Amigos, no pasa ná! (1995)
- Gitano (1996)
- Ladrón de Amores (2001)
- Cabibi (2002)

Compilation albums:

- Ni más ni menos (1998)
- Todo Chichos:De la Rumba somos los dueños (2004)
- Hasta aquí hemos llegado (2008)

== See also ==
- List of best-selling Latin music artists
