= Alberto González (footballer, born 1983) =

Spanish footballer (born 1983)

Personal information
- Full name: Alberto González Pérez
- Date of birth: 31 March 1983 (age 43)
- Place of birth: Ruente, Spain
- Height: 1.86 m (6 ft 1 in)
- Position: Centre back

Senior career*
Years	Team	Apps	(Gls)
2002–2004	Gimnástica	49	(0)
2004–2006	Real Unión	59	(0)
2006–2008	Salamanca	3	(0)
2007–2008	→ Lleida (loan)	32	(0)
2008–2009	Linense	33	(0)
2009–2013	Gimnástica	121	(0)
2013–2014	Sestao	30	(0)
- * Club domestic league appearances and goals

Alberto González Pérez (born 31 March 1983) is a Spanish former footballer who played as a central defender.
