= Larry Gonzáles =

American boxer

Personal information
- Nickname: Pitbull
- Born: Larry Nelson Gonzáles; May 21, 1975 (age 51) Denver, Colorado, United States
- Height: 6 ft 1 in (185 cm)
- Weight: Welterweight

Boxing career
- Reach: 75 in (191 cm)
- Stance: Counterpuncher

Boxing record
- Total fights: 10
- Wins: 8
- Win by KO: 2
- Losses: 2
- Draws: 0
- No contests: 0

Larry Nelson Gonzáles (born May 21, 1975) is an American former professional boxer who competed from 2003 to 2005. As an amateur, he won the 2002 National Golden Gloves at light welterweight.

== Amateur career ==
Originally suspended by Colorado boxing officials for a connection with a melee during the Golden Gloves championships at the National Western Stadium Arena. U.S. boxing reinstated Larry, Adrain Mora and Anthony Mora due to charges never being filed. Gonzales is the 2002 Golden Gloves Champion at Light Welterweight.

== Professional career ==
On January 21, 2005 Gonzales won a unanimous decision over prospect Julio César García in an eight round fight.
