= Gonzalo Rodríguez Risco =

Peruvian playwright and screenwriter (born 1972)

Gonzalo Rodríguez Risco (born 1972) is a Peruvian playwright and screenwriter. He is a graduate of Yale School of Drama, M.F.A. in Playwriting in 2009.

== Biography ==
He was born in Lima, Peru. He graduated from the Missouri University of Science and Technology in Engineering Management (1990–1993).

His first play "Un Verso Pasajero" was awarded First Prize at the First Festival of Peruvian and North-American Theater (Lima, Peru) in 1996, and First Prize at the Premiera 2003 contest for play translated into Russian (Moscow, Russia). It has also been staged in Cusco, Lima and Fresno, California. In 2001, it was published in "Muestra" Magazine.

"La Manzana Prohibida" premiered in Lima, 1997. It won the First Prize at the National Contest for Young Playwrights and was later published in "Dramaturgia Peruana II" in 2001.

"Asunto de Tres" premiered at the Fifth Festival of Peruvian and North-American Theater in 2000. It was revived in Lima in 2004. The play was published in "Muestra" Magazine in 2008. In 2007, the play was re-worked and premiered at Yale Cabaret, New Haven, as "Threesome."

Other plays include "Generación Y", "Rainbow", Mal-Criadas (in collaboration with Diego La Hoz), "El Musical" and TV-Terapia. His works also include short plays like "Juego de Manos", "Vesti La Giubba", "Pensión" and "Servicio Íntimo Exclusivo para Damas".

In 2003 he wrote "Taxi Scene" as part of Webs We Weave, an international playwriting project via the Internet. The scene, as part of the project "We Are Water" was broadcast as Play of the Week on May 31, 2003. Later that year he was invited to London to attend a workshop and write another radio play entitled "Sight", as part of the BBC & British Council Residency.

In 2005, he wrote "Expiration". The play became a finalist at Long Beach Playhouse's 19th Annual New Work’s Festival (2008) and at Reverie Productions’ 6th Annual Next Generation Playwriting Contest (2009).

"Journey To Santiago – Six Scenes on Growing up Catholic" was staged at the First Year Play Festival at Yale School of Drama in 2007. It was directed by Erik Pearson and later published in "The Private Life" along two plays from Yale School of Drama Playwrights, Matt Moses and Mattie Brickman. In 2007, he premiered "Father/Son". as part of "Speaking Our Mind" at the Carlotta Festival of New Plays in New Haven.

At the end of the year, his play Dramatis Personae, directed by Becca Wolff, was staged at the Langston Hughes Festival of New Plays in New Haven. It was later staged in Lima, Peru in 2008. The US premiere of the play was an Off-Broadway production at the Cherry Lane Theater Studio, directed by Erik Pearson in the Fall of 2010.

At the Yale Cabaret, he presented Gay Play. directed by Michael Walkup in 2008.

In 2009, he premiered The French Play at the Carlotta Festival of New Plays in New Haven directed by Patricia McGregor. It was a finalist at Long Beach Playhouse’s 20th Annual New Works' Festival and semi-finalist at the Stanley Drama Award in New York.

He speaks fluently English and Spanish.

He wrote, with Daniel Rodriguez, the script "El Vientre". The script won Ibermedia in the co-production category in 2010.

== Works ==
Full-length plays

- The French Play (2009)
- Dramatis Personae (Spanish, 2008)
- Dramatis Personae (English, 2007)
- Expiration (2005)
- TV-Terapia (2003)
- El Musical (2002, Musical)
- Mal-Criadas (2000) - Written with Diego La Hoz
- Generación Y (1998)
- La Manzana Prohibida (1997)
- Un Verso Pasajero (1996)
- El Último Invitado
- 101 Dálmatas (Musical)
- El Cielo y Tú (with José Enrique Mavila)

One-act plays / Short plays

- Gay Play (2008)
- Threesome (2007)
- Father/Son (2007)
- Journey to Santiago (2007)
- Servicio Íntimo Exclusivo para Damas (2006)
- Pensión (2006)
- Asunto de Tres (2000)
- Vesti La Giubba (1999)
- Rainbow (1999)
- Juegos de Manos (1998)
- Waiting for the President
- Juicio de Medea

Radio plays

- Sight (2003)
- Taxi Scene (2003)
- VISA

Translations

Musicals (book and lyrics)

- “The Rocky Horror Show” by Richard O'Brien (2001)
- “A Chorus Line” by Hamlisch and Kleban (1999) - See Videos

Plays

- “The Mystery of Irma Vep” by Charles Ludlam (2002).
- “'Art'” by Yasmina Reza (2000)
- “Unidentified Human Remains and the True Nature of Love” by Brad Fraser (with Jaime Nieto, 2000)
- “Picasso at the Lapin Agile” by Steve Martin (1999)
- “Marisol” by José Rivera (1999)
