= Gonzalo González (footballer, born 1995) =

Argentine footballer (born 1995)

Personal information
- Full name: Gonzalo Ezequiel González
- Date of birth: 6 March 1995 (age 31)
- Place of birth: Quilmes, Argentina
- Position: Forward

Team information
- Current team: Acassuso

Youth career
- –2015: Arsenal Sarandí

Senior career*
Years	Team	Apps	(Gls)
2015	Arsenal Sarandí	1	(0)
2015–2016	El Porvenir	11	(5)
2016–2018	Acassuso	29	(2)
- * Club domestic league appearances and goals as of 15:44, 21 March 2018 (UTC)

Gonzalo Ezequiel González (born 6 March 1995) is an Argentine professional footballer who plays as a forward for Primera B Metropolitana side Acassuso.

== Career ==
González ascended through the youth ranks of Argentine Primera División club Arsenal Sarandí. He made his professional debut with the first team on 10 July 2015, coming on during the final minutes of a 1–0 defeat against Gimnasia LP. His only other appearance with the club was in a Copa Sudamericana fixture two months later. He completed his transfer to Primera D side El Porvenir in time for the 2016 season. That year, González scored five goals in eleven matches as he led his team to a first-place league finish and promotion to Primera C.

He joined Primera B Metropolitana side Acassuso in July 2016. His debut for the club came on 27 August in a 1–0 defeat to Comunicaciones. He scored his first professional goal in his sixth match, a 1–1 draw with Platense on 30 October. It came two minutes after being subbed into the game.

== Honours ==
El Porvenir

- Primera D (1): 2016

== Career statistics ==
As of 21 March 2018.

Club statistics
Club	Season	League			Cup		League Cup		Continental		Other		Total	
Club	Season	Division	Apps	Goals	Apps	Goals	Apps	Goals	Apps	Goals	Apps	Goals	Apps	Goals
Arsenal Sarandí	2015	Primera División	1	0	—		—		1 (Note: One appearance in 2014 Copa Sudamericana)	0	0	0	2	0
Arsenal Sarandí	Total		1	0	—		—		1	0	0	0	2	0
El Porvenir	2016	Primera D	11	5	—		—		—		0	0	11	5
El Porvenir	Total		11	5	—		—		—		0	0	11	5
Acassuso	2016–17	Primera B Metropolitana	24	2	—		—		—		0	0	24	2
Acassuso	2017–18	Primera B Metropolitana	5	0	—		—		—		0	0	5	0
Acassuso	Total		29	2	—		—		—		0	0	29	2
Career total			41	7	—		—		—		0	0	42	7
