= 1970 in philosophy =

List of years in philosophy
- … 1960; 1961; 1962; 1963; 1964; 1965; 1966; 1967; 1968; 1969; 1970; 1971; 1972; 1973; 1974; 1975; 1976; 1977; 1978; 1979; 1980 …
- Art; Archaeology; Architecture; Literature; Music; Philosophy; Science; +...

1970 in philosophy

== Events ==
- Lewis White Beck emerges as the co-chair for the proceedings of the Third International Kant Congress at the University of Rochester during the first such gathering of internationally recognized Kantian scholars in the United States.

== Publications ==
- Hannah Arendt, On Violence
- Phillipa Foot, Morality and Art, Oxford University Press
- Michel Foucault, The Order of Things (translation from French), London: Tavistock Publications
- Alvin Goldman, A Theory of Human Action, Prentice-Hall
- D. Z. Phillips, Faith and Philosophical Inquiry, London: Routledge
- W. V. O. Quine, Philosophy of Logic, Prentice-Hall
- Nicholas Rescher, Scientific Explanation, New York: The Free Press
- John Searle, Speech Acts
- Richard Swinburne, The Concept of Miracle
- Richard Clyde Taylor, Good and Evil: A New Direction (1970)
- Mary Warnock, Existentialism, Oxford University Press
- Nicholas Wolterstorff, On Universals–An Essay in Ontology, University of Chicago Press

== Births ==
- February 21 - Christian Lotz
- March 6 - Vincent F. Hendricks
- March 20 - Robert Arp
- April 22 - Nicole C. Karafyllis
- September 1 - Sam Gillespie (died 2003)
- September 16 - Lars Svendsen
- Cressida Heyes
- William Irwin (philosopher)
- Daniel Ross (philosopher)
- Kyle Stanford
- Yannis Stavrakakis
- Robert B. Talisse

== Deaths ==
- January 6 - Philip Wheelwright (born 1901)
- January 7 - Fritz Heinemann (born 1889)
- February 2 - Bertrand Russell (born 1872)
- February 3 - Max Hamburger (born 1897)
- April 4 - Khoren Sargsian (born 1891)
- June 14 - Roman Ingarden (born 1893)
- July 23 - K. N. Jayatilleke (born 1920)
- August 17 - Harry Allen Overstreet (born 1875)
- September 2 - Vasyl Sukhomlynsky (born 1918)
- September 14 - Rudolf Carnap (born 1891)
- October 8 - Lucien Goldmann (born 1913)
- October 12 - Andreas Speiser (born 1885)
- October 30 - Heinrich Blücher (born 1899)
- December 16 - Friedrich Pollock (born 1894)
- December 21 - Johannes Jacobus Poortman (born 1896)
- December 23 - Carlos Astrada (born 1894)
