= 1968 in philosophy =

List of years in philosophy
- … 1958; 1959; 1960; 1961; 1962; 1963; 1964; 1965; 1966; 1967; 1968; 1969; 1970; 1971; 1972; 1973; 1974; 1975; 1976; 1977; 1978 …
- Art; Archaeology; Architecture; Literature; Music; Philosophy; Science; +...

1968 in philosophy

== Events ==
- Lewis White Beck and Robert L. Holmes collaborate at the University of Rochester in the authorship of Philosophic Inquiry: An Introduction to Philosophy (Prentice-Hall, 1968).

== Publications ==
- Michael Polanyi, Life's Irreducible Structure (1968)
- Buckminster Fuller, Operating Manual for Spaceship Earth (1968)
- Hans Albert, Treatise on Critical Reason (1968)
- Gilles Deleuze, Difference and Repetition (1968)
- Taylor, Richard Clyde, "Dare to be Wise", The Review of Metaphysics, Vol, 21, No, 4, pp. 615-629
- James D. Watson, The Double Helix (1968)
- Jürgen Habermas, Knowledge and Human Interests (originally published in German as Erkenntnis und Interesse; English translation: 1972)

=== Philosophical literature ===
- Philip K. Dick, Do Androids Dream of Electric Sheep? (1968)

== Births ==
Death years link to the corresponding '[year] in philosophy' article

- July 11 – Mark Fisher, 48, British writer, music journalist (The Wire, Fact), and cultural theorist. His most influential work was published in 2009: Capitalist Realism: Is there no alternative? (d. 2017)
- Julian Baggini

== Deaths ==
- June 4 - Alexandre Kojève (born 1902)
- December 10 - Karl Barth (born 1886)
