= 1964 in philosophy =

List of years in philosophy
- … 1954; 1955; 1956; 1957; 1958; 1959; 1960; 1961; 1962; 1963; 1964; 1965; 1966; 1967; 1968; 1969; 1970; 1971; 1972; 1973; 1974 …
- Art; Archaeology; Architecture; Literature; Music; Philosophy; Science; +...

1964 in philosophy

== Events ==
- Jean-Paul Sartre was awarded the Nobel Prize in Literature, but he declined it, stating that a writer must "refuse to let himself be transformed into an institution, even if this occurs under the most honorable circumstances".
- The Sigmund Freud Prize was inaugurated in 1964.

== Publications ==
- Lon L. Fuller, The Morality of Law (1964)
- Mao Zedong, Quotations from Chairman Mao (1964)
- Herbert Marcuse, One-Dimensional Man (1964)
- Marshall McLuhan, Understanding Media: The Extensions of Man (1964)
- Jürgen Moltmann, Theology of Hope (1964)

== Births ==
- December 8 - Richard David Precht
- December 30 - Christof Rapp

== Deaths ==
- March 18 - Norbert Wiener (born 1894)
- April 14 - Rachel Carson (born 1907)
- April 23 - Karl Polanyi (born 1886)
