= 1975 in philosophy =

List of years in philosophy
- … 1965; 1966; 1967; 1968; 1969; 1970; 1971; 1972; 1973; 1974; 1975; 1976; 1977; 1978; 1979; 1980; 1981; 1982; 1983; 1984; 1985 …
- Art; Archaeology; Architecture; Literature; Music; Philosophy; Science; +...

1975 in philosophy

== Publications ==
- Anderson, Alan Ross and Nuel Belnap. Entailment: the logic of relevance and necessity, vol. I. Princeton University Press.
- Beck, Lewis White. The Actor and the Spectator
- Capra, Fritjof. The Tao of Physics: An Exploration of the Parallels Between Modern Physics and Eastern Mysticism.
- Cole, Peter and Jerry L. Morgan (ed.), Syntax and Semantics Vol. 3: Speech Acts. New York: Academic Press.
  - Grice, Paul. "Logic and conversation." pp. 41–58. (Reprinted in Studies in the Way of Words, ed. H. P. Grice, pp. 22–40. Cambridge, MA: Harvard University Press, 1989)
  - Searle, John. "Indirect speech acts." pp. 59–82. (Reprinted in Pragmatics: A Reader, ed. S. Davis, pp. 265–277. Oxford: Oxford University Press, 1991)
  - Gordon, D. and Lakoff, George. "Conversational postulates." pp. 83–106.
  - Green, Georgia M. "How to get people to do things with words." pp. 107–141.
  - Davison, A. "Indirect speech acts and what to do with them." pp. 143–184.
  - Cole, Peter. "The synchronic and diachronic status of conversational implicature." pp. 257–288.
- Douglas, Mary. Implicit Meanings: Essays in Anthropology.
- Feyerabend, Paul. Against Method: Outline of an Anarchistic Theory of Knowledge.
- Fodor, Jerry. The Language of Thought, Harvard University Press.
- Hacking, Ian. Why Does Language Matter to Philosophy?
- Hacking, Ian. The Emergence of Probability: a Philosophical Study of Early Ideas About Probability, Induction and Statistical Inference. Cambridge: Cambridge University Press.
- Lewis, David. "Languages and language." In Minnesota Studies in the Philosophy of Language, ed. K. Gunderson, vol. 7, pp. 3–35. Minneapolis: University of Minnesota Press. Reprinted in A. P. Martinich, ed., The Philosophy of Language 3rd edition, pp. 538–557. New York: Oxford University Press, 1996.
- Pask, Gordon. Conversation, Cognition and Learning. New York: Elsevier.
- Pask, Gordon. The Cybernetics of Human Learning and Performance. Hutchinson.
- Percy, Walker. The Message in the Bottle.
- Putnam, Hilary. Mind, Language and Reality (Philosophical Papers Vol. 2), Cambridge: Cambridge University Press.
  - "The Meaning of 'Meaning'"
- Ricoeur, Paul. The Rule of Metaphor: Multi-Disciplinary Studies in the Creation of Meaning in Language, trans. Robert Czerny with Kathleen McLaughlin and S. J., John Costello, London: Routledge and Kegan Paul, 1978.
- Singer, Peter. Animal Liberation.
- Sober, Elliott. Simplicity. Oxford University Press.
- Sperber, Dan. Rethinking Symbolism. Cambridge University Press.
- Unger, Peter. Ignorance: A Case for Skepticism. New York: Oxford University Press.
- Unger, Roberto. Knowledge and Politics. Free Press.
- Michael Polanyi and Harry Prosch, Meaning.
- Hans Blumenberg, The Genesis of the Copernican World.

== Births ==
- 9 November - Raphaël Enthoven

== Deaths ==
- 4 December - Hannah Arendt, 69
