= 1979 in philosophy =

| List of years in philosophy |
- … 1969; 1970; 1971; 1972; 1973; 1974; 1975; 1976; 1977; 1978; 1979; 1980; 1981; 1982; 1983; 1984; 1985; 1986; 1987; 1988; 1989 …
- Art; Archaeology; Architecture; Literature; Music; Philosophy; Science; +...

1979 in philosophy

== Events ==
- Hegel Society of Great Britain was founded in 1979.

== Publications ==
- Peter Singer, Practical Ethics (1979)
- Amartya Sen, Equality of What? (The Tanner Lectures on Human Values)
- Beck, Lewis White, Mr. Boswell Dines with Professor Kant, (Tragara Press, 1979)
- Dreyfus, Hubert, What Computers Can't Do: The Limits of Artificial Intelligence, 2nd ed. (First ed., 1972)
- Fodor, Jerry, Representations: Essays on the Foundations of Cognitive Science, Harvard Press (UK) and MIT Press (US)
- Hofstadter, Douglas, Gödel, Escher, Bach: an Eternal Golden Braid. Basic Books. (Won Pulitzer Prize in 1980.)
- Kripke, Saul, "A Puzzle about Belief", In: Meaning and Use, edited by A. Margalit. Dordrecht and Boston: Reidel.
- Lewis, David, "Prisoners' Dilemma is a Newcomb Problem," Philosophy and Public Affairs, 8, pp 235–40.
- Lewis, David, "Counterfactual Dependence and Time's Arrow," Nous, 13, pp 455–76.
- Lewis, David, "Scorekeeping in a Language Game," Journal of Philosophical Logic, 8, pp 339–59.
- Lewis, David, "Attitude De Dicto and De Se," Philosophical Review, 88, pp 513–43.
- Lewis, David, "Lucas against Mechanism II," Canadian Journal of Philosophy, 9, pp 373–76.
- Marquard, Odo, "In Praise of Polytheism", in Hans Poser, ed., Philosophie und Mythos. Ein Kolloquium (de Gruyter, Berlin and New York), pp. 40–58
- McDowell, John, "Virtue and Reason," The Monist, lxii, 331–50; reprinted in Stanley G. Clarke and Evan Simpson, eds., Anti-Theory in Ethics and Moral Conservatism (SUNY Press, Albany, 1989), pp. 87–109
- Ortony, Andrew (ed.), Metaphor and Thought, Cambridge: Cambridge University Press (Note: Some authors and contents may not have originated in 1979, but included in the revised edition in 1993.)
  - Metaphor, language and thought, Andrew Ortony
  - More about metaphor, Max Black
  - Part I. Metaphor and Meaning
  - Figurative speech and linguistics, Jerrold M. Saddock
  - The semantics of metaphor, L. Jonathan Cohen
  - Some problems with the notion of literal meanings, David E. Rumelhart
  - Metaphor, John R. Searle
  - Language, concepts, and worlds: Three domains of metaphor, Samuel R. Levin
  - Observations on the pragmatics of metaphor, Jerry L. Morgan
  - Part II. Metaphor and Representation
  - Generative metaphor: A perspective on problem-setting in social policy, Donald A. Schön
  - The conduit metaphor: A case of frame conflict in our language about language, Michael J. Reddy
  - The contemporary theory of metaphor, George Lakoff
  - Process and products in making sense of tropes, Raymond W. Gibbs, Jr.
  - Metaphor, induction, and social policy: The Convergence of macroscopic and microscopic views, Robert J. Sternberg and Roger Tourangeau
  - Part III. Metaphor and Understanding
  - Psychological processes in metaphor comprehension and memory, Allan Paivio and Mary Walsh
  - The interpretation of novel metaphors, Bruce Fraser
  - The role of similarity in similes and metaphors, Andrew Ortony
  - Images and models, Similes and Metaphors, George A. Miller
  - How Metaphors Work, Sam Glucksberg and Boaz Keysar
  - Metaphor and irony: two levels of understanding, Ellen Winner and Howard Gardner
  - Part IV. Metaphor and Science
  - The shift from metaphor to analogy in western science, Dedre Gentner and Michael Jeziorski
  - Metaphor and theory change: What is ‘metaphor’ a metaphor for? Richard Boyd
  - Metaphor in science, Thomas S. Kuhn
  - Metaphorical imprecision and the ‘top-down’ research strategy, Zenon W. Pylyshyn
  - Part V. Metaphor and Education
  - The instructive metaphor: metaphoric aids to students’ understanding of science, Richard E. Mayer
  - Metaphor and learning, Hugh G. Petrie and Rebecca S. Oshlag
  - Learning without metaphor, Thomas F. Green
  - Educational uses of metaphor, Thomas G. Sticht
- Osgood, Charles E., Focus on Meaning: Explorations in Semantic Space. Mouton Publishers.
- Osgood, Charles E., "What is a Language?" In: Aaronson, D. & Rieber, R. (eds.) Psycholinguistic Research: Implications and Applications. Hillsdale, N.J.: Erlbaum. pp. 189–228.
- Perry, John, "The Problem of the Essential Indexical." Noûs 13, no. 1: 3 – 21.
- Popper, Karl, Objective Knowledge: An Evolutionary Approach, Rev. ed. (First ed., 1972)
- Rorty, Richard, Philosophy and the Mirror of Nature
- Searle, John, Expression and Meaning
  - Introduction
  - Origins of the essays
  - 1. A taxonomy of illocutionary acts
  - 2. Indirect speech acts
  - 3. The logical status of fictional discourse
  - 4. Metaphor
  - 5. Literal meaning
  - 6. Referential and attributive
  - 7. Speech acts and recent linguistics
- Hans Jonas, The Imperative of Responsibility (1979)
- James Lovelock, Gaia: A New Look at Life on Earth (1979)
- Hans Albert, Das Elend der Theologie (in German, not yet translated into English; 1979)
- Jean-Francois Lyotard, The Postmodern Condition (1979)
- Leo Bersani, Baudelaire and Freud (1979)

== Births ==
- September 22 - Roberto Saviano

== Deaths ==
- January 15 - Charles W. Morris (born 1901)
- March 14 - Charles Stevenson (born 1908)
- March 16 - Jean Monnet (born 1888)
- May 8 - Talcott Parsons (born 1902)
- July 29 - Herbert Marcuse (born 1898)
- September 7 - I. A. Richards (born 1893)
- Paul Schatz (unspecified)
