= 1960 in philosophy =

List of years in philosophy
- … 1950; 1951; 1952; 1953; 1954; 1955; 1956; 1957; 1958; 1959; 1960; 1961; 1962; 1963; 1964; 1965; 1966; 1967; 1968; 1969; 1970 …
- Art; Archaeology; Architecture; Literature; Music; Philosophy; Science; +...

1960 in philosophy

== Events ==
- British Society of Aesthetics founded.
- Dutch mathematician Hans Freudenthal invents the artificial language Lincos, intended for communication with extraterrestrial intelligence.

== Publications ==
- Lewis White Beck, A Commentary on Kant's Critique of Practical Reason
- Elias Canetti, Crowds and Power
- Hans-Georg Gadamer, Truth and Method

=== Philosophical fiction ===
- Raja Rao, The Serpent and the Rope

== Births ==
- February 27 - Simon Critchley, English philosopher
- June 25 - Vittorio Hösle, Italian-born German philosopher

== Deaths ==
Birth years link to the corresponding "[year] in philosophy" article:

- January 4 - Albert Camus, French author and philosopher (born 1913) (automobile accident)
- February 8 - J. L. Austin, English philosopher of language (born 1911) (lung cancer)
