= 1958 in philosophy =

List of years in philosophy
- … 1948; 1949; 1950; 1951; 1952; 1953; 1954; 1955; 1956; 1957; 1958; 1959; 1960; 1961; 1962; 1963; 1964; 1965; 1966; 1967; 1968 …
- Art; Archaeology; Architecture; Literature; Music; Philosophy; Science; +...

1958 in philosophy

== Publications ==
- Peter Winch, The Idea of a Social Science and Its Relation to Philosophy (1958)
- Gaston Bachelard, The Poetics of Space (1958)
- Michael Polanyi, Personal Knowledge: Towards a Post-Critical Philosophy (1958)
- Clifton Fadiman (editor), Fantasia Mathematica (1958)
- Hannah Arendt, The Human Condition (1958)
- Isaiah Berlin, Two Concepts of Liberty (1958)
- Raymond Williams, Culture and Society (1958)

=== Philosophical literature ===
- Willem Frederik Hermans, The Darkroom of Damocles (1958)

== Births ==
- March 12 - Thomas Metzinger

== Deaths ==
- February 22 - Ralph Waldo Trine (born 1866)
- May 2 - Alfred Weber (born 1868)
- October 24 - G. E. Moore (born 1873)
- December 15 - Wolfgang Pauli (born 1900)
