= 1955 in philosophy =

List of years in philosophy
- … 1945; 1946; 1947; 1948; 1949; 1950; 1951; 1952; 1953; 1954; 1955; 1956; 1957; 1958; 1959; 1960; 1961; 1962; 1963; 1964; 1965 …
- Art; Archaeology; Architecture; Literature; Music; Philosophy; Science; +...

1955 in philosophy

== Publications ==
- Raymond Aron, The Opium of the Intellectuals
- J. L. Austin, How to Do Things With Words
- Pierre Teilhard de Chardin, The Phenomenon of Man (published posthumously)
- Herman Dooyeweerd, A New Critique of Theoretical Thought
  - Volume II: The General Theory of Modal Spheres
  - Volume III: The Structures of Individuality of Temporal Reality
- Claude Lévi-Strauss, Tristes Tropiques
- J. L. Mackie, "Evil and Omnipotence" (in Mind)
- Herbert Marcuse, Eros and Civilization
- Paul Ricoeur, History and Truth
- Lionel Trilling, Freud and the Crisis of Our Culture
- Simone Weil, Oppression and Liberty

== Births ==
- June 8 - Tim Berners-Lee, English computer scientist, inventor of the World Wide Web
- December 28 - Liu Xiaobo, Chinese literary critic and human rights activist

== Deaths ==
- February 17 - L. P. Jacks, English philosopher (b. 1860)
- April 10 - Pierre Teilhard de Chardin, French Jesuit theologian, philosopher and paleontologist (b. 1881)
- April 18 - Albert Einstein, German-born theoretical physicist (b. 1879)
- September 30 - Louis Leon Thurstone, American pioneer of psychometrics and psychophysics (b. 1887)
- October 18 - José Ortega y Gasset, Spanish philosopher (b. 1883)
