= Bibliography of Socrates =

List of works about Socrates

The bibliography of Socrates comprises works about the ancient Greek philosopher Socrates.

== Biographies ==
- The Hemlock Cup (2011) by Bettany Hughes

== Compendia ==
- Ahbel-Rappe, Sara; Kamtekar, Rachana, eds. (2006). A Companion to Socrates. Blackwell Companions to Philosophy. Blackwell. ISBN 978-1-4051-0863-8.
- Morrison, D. R., ed. (2011). The Cambridge Companion to Socrates. Cambridge University Press. ISBN 978-0-5215-4103-9.

== Other ==
- Aristotle's Dialogue with Socrates: On the Nicomachean Ethics (2008) by Ronna Burger
- Socratic Citizenship (2001) by Dana Villa

== Theses ==
- On the Concept of Irony with Continual Reference to Socrates (1841) by Søren Kierkegaard
