= Abbot Payson Usher Prize =

History of technology prize

The Abbot Payson Usher Memorial Prize, established in 1961 and named for Dr Abbott Payson Usher, is an award given annually by Society for the History of Technology for the best scholarly work on the history of technology published during the preceding three years under the auspices of the Society.

Recipients include some of the most highly regarded historians of technology, including such pioneering figures as Robert S. Woodbury, Silvio Bedini, Robert Multhauf, Eugene S. Ferguson, Cyril Stanley Smith and others. The prize also indicates shifts in the field's emphasis over more than five decades from early technical studies of individual machines; the subsequent prominence of science, systems, and industrial research in the work of Thomas P. Hughes, George Wise, Bruce Seely and others; the rise of politics, gender and colonialism; and the recent shift to cultural histories of technology by Edward Jones-Imhotep and others. Pamela O. Long's Usher-prize-winning "Openness of Knowledge" was one basis for her awards as Guggenheim Fellow and MacArthur Fellow.

== Past recipients ==
Source: Abbot Payson Usher Memorial Prize

- 2024: Faisal Husain, “To Dam or Not to Dam: The Social Construction of an Ottoman Hydraulic Project, 1701-1702,” Technology and Culture 64:2 (2023): 456–484.
- 2023: Leor Halevi, "What Hath Allah Wrought? The Global Invention of Prescriptive Machines for the Islamic Consumer, 1975–2010", Technology and Culture 62:3 (2021): 741–779
- 2022: Robert MacDougall, "Sympathetic Physics: The Keely Motor and The Laws of Thermodynamics in Nineteenth Century Culture", Technology and Culture 60:2 (2019): 438–46
- 2021: Robyn d’Avignon, "Spirited Geobodies: Producing Subterranean Property in Nineteenth-Century Bambuk, West Africa", Technology and Culture 61:2 Supplement (2020), S20-S48
- 2020: Daniel Williford, "Seismic Politics: Risk and Reconstruction after the 1960 Earthquake in Agadir, Morocco", Technology and Culture 58:4 (October 2017): 982–1016
- 2019: Eden Medina, "Forensic Identification in the Aftermath of Human Rights Crimes in Chile: A Decentered Computer History", Technology and Culture 59:4 (Supplement, 2018): S100–S133
- 2018: Whitney Laemmli, "A Case in Pointe: Romance and Regimentation at the New York City Ballet", Technology and Culture 56 (January 2015): 1–27
- 2017: Edward Jones-Imhotep, "Malleability and Machines: Glenn Gould and the Technological Self", Technology and Culture 57 (April 2016): 287–321
- 2016: Edward J. Gillin, "Prophets of Progress: authority in the scientific projections and religious realisations of the Great Eastern steamship", Technology and Culture 56 (October 2015): 928–956
- 2015: Jung Lee, "Invention without Science: 'Korean Edisons' and the Changing Understanding of Technology in Colonial Korea", Technology and Culture 54 (October 2013): 782–814
- 2014: Chris Evans and Alun Withey, "An Enlightenment in Steel? Innovation in the Steel Trades of Eighteenth-Century Britain", Technology and Culture 53 (July 2012): 533–560
- 2013: Thomas S. Mullaney, "The Moveable Typewriter: How Chinese Typists Developed Predictive Text during the Height of Maoism", Technology and Culture 53 (October 2012): 777-814
- 2012: Tiina Männistö-Funk, "The Crossroads of Technology and Tradition: Vernacular Bicycles in Rural Finland, 1880-1910", Technology and Culture 52 (October 2011): 733–756
- 2011: David Biggs, "Breaking from the Colonial Mold: Water Engineering and the Failure of Nation-Building in the Plain of Reeds, Vietnam", Technology and Culture 49 (July 2008): 599–623
- 2010: Peter Norton, "Street Rivals: Jaywalking and the Invention of the Motor Age", Technology and Culture 48 (April 2007): 331–359
- 2009: Crosbie Smith and Anne Scott, "'Trust in Providence': Building Confidence into the Cunard Line of Steamers", Technology and Culture 48 (July 2007): 471–96
- 2008: Eric Schatzberg, "Technik Comes to America: Changing Meanings of Technology before 1930", Technology and Culture 47 (2006): 486-512 JSTOR 40061169
- 2007: Carlo Belfanti, "Guilds, Patents, and the Circulation of Technical Knowledge: Northern Italy during the Early Modern Age", Technology and Culture 45 (2004): 569–89
- 2006: Lissa Roberts, "An Arcadian Apparatus: The Introduction of the Steam Engine into the Dutch Landscape", Technology and Culture 45 (2004): 251–76
- 2005: William Storey, "Guns, Race, and Skill in Nineteenth-Century South Africa", Technology and Culture 45 (2004): 687–711
- 2004: Kenneth Lipartito, "Picturephone and the Information Age: The Social Meaning of Failure", Technology and Culture 44 (2003): 50–81
- 2003: Amy Slaton, "'As Near as Practicable': Precision, Ambiguity, and the Social Features of Industrial Quality Control", Technology and Culture 42 (2001): 51–80
- 2002: Wiebe E. Bijker and Karin Bijsterveld, "Walking through Plans: Technology, Democracy and Gender Identity", Technology and Culture 41 (2000): 485–515
- 2001: John K. Brown, "Design Plans, Working Drawings, National Styles: Engineering Practice in Great Britain and the United States, 1775-1945", Technology and Culture 41 (2000): 195–238
- 2000: Matthew W. Roth, "Mulholland Highway and the Engineering Culture of Los Angeles in the 1920s", Technology and Culture 40 (1999): 545–575
- 1999: Joy Parr, "What Makes Washday Less Blue? Gender, Choice, Nation, and Technology Choice in Postwar Canada", Technology and Culture 38 (1997): 153–186
- 1998: David Mindell, "'The Clangor of That Blacksmith's Fray': Technology, War, and Experience Aboard the USS Monitor", Technology and Culture 36 (1995): 242-70 JSTOR 3106372
- 1997: Eric Schatzberg, "Ideology and Technical Choice: The Decline of the Wooden Airplane in the United States, 1920-1945", Technology and Culture 35 (1994): 34-69 JSTOR 3106748
- 1996: Gabrielle Hecht, "Political Designs: Nuclear Reactors and National Policy in Postwar France", Technology and Culture 35 (1994): 657-85 JSTOR 3106502
- 1995: Jameson W. Doig and David P. Billington, "Ammann's First Bridge: A Study in Engineering, Politics, and Entrepreneurial Behavior", Technology and Culture 35 (1994): 537-70 JSTOR 3106258
- 1994: John Law, "The Olympus 320 Engine: A Case Study in Design, Development, and Organizational Control", Technology and Culture 33 (1992): 409-40 JSTOR 3106632
- 1993: Barton Hacker, "An Annotated Index to Volumes 1-25", Technology and Culture (1991) JSTOR i356102; and Pamela O. Long, "The Openness of Knowledge: An Ideal and Its Context in 16th-Century Writings on Mining and Metallurgy", Technology and Culture 32 (1991): 318-55 JSTOR 3105713
- 1992: Bryan Pfaffenberger, "The Harsh Facts of Hydraulics: Technology and Society in Sri Lanka's Colonization Schemes", Technology and Culture 31 (1990): 361-97 JSTOR 3106052
- 1991: Robert Gordon, "Who Turned the Mechanical Ideal into Mechanical Reality?" Technology and Culture 29 (1988): 744-78 JSTOR 3105044
- 1990: Laurence F. Gross, "Wool Carding: A Study of Skills and Technology", Technology and Culture 28 (1987): 804-27 JSTOR 3105183
- 1989: Larry Owens, "Vannevar Bush and the Differential Analyzer: The Text and Context of an Early Computer", Technology and Culture 27 (1986): 63-95 JSTOR 3104945
- 1988: Judith A. McGaw, "Accounting for Innovation: Technological Change and Business Practice in the Berkshire County Paper Industry", Technology and Culture 26 (1985): 703-25 JSTOR 3105616
- 1987: Bruce E. Seely, "The Scientific Mystique in Engineering: Highway Research at the Bureau of Public Roads, 1918-1940", Technology and Culture 25 (1984): 798-831 JSTOR 3104623
- 1986: Donald MacKenzie, "Marx and the Machine", Technology and Culture 25 (1984): 473-502 JSTOR 3104202
- 1985: Eda Fowlks Kranakis, "The French Connection: Giffard's Injector and the Nature of Heat", Technology and Culture 23 (1982): 3-38 JSTOR 3104441
- 1984: Walter G. Vincenti, "Control-Volume Analysis: A Difference in Thinking between Engineering and Physics", Technology and Culture 23 (1982): 145-74 JSTOR 3104129
- 1983: George Wise, "A New Role for Professional Scientists in Industry: Industrial Research at General Electric, 1900-1916", Technology and Culture (1980): 408-29 JSTOR 3103155
- 1982: Harold Dorn, "Hugh Lincoln Cooper and the First Détente", Technology and Culture 20 (1979): 322-47 JSTOR 3103869
- 1981: Thomas P. Hughes, "The Electrification of America: The System Builders", Technology and Culture 20 (1979): 124-61 JSTOR 3103115
- 1974: Carl Mitcham and Robert Mackey for their bibliography of the philosophy of technology, first published as a supplement to Technology and Culture 14 (1973) and then separately by the University of Chicago Press.
- 1974: R. L. Hills and A. J. Pacey "The Measurement of Power in Early Steam-Driven Textile Mills", Technology and Culture 13 (1972): 25–43 JSTOR 3102654
- 1972: Cyril Stanley Smith, "Art, Technology and Science: Notes on their Historical Interaction", Technology and Culture 11 (1970): 493-549 JSTOR 3102690
- 1969: Eugene S. Ferguson, "Bibliography of the History of Technology", an expansion of a series of articles originally published in Technology and Culture (1962–1965) and constituting no. 5 in the Monograph Series of the History of Technology, published jointly by SHOT and MIT Press
- 1968: Carl W. Condit, "The First Reinforced-Concrete Skyscraper: The Ingalls Building in Cincinnati and Its Place in Structural History", Technology and Culture 9 (1968): 1-33 JSTOR 3102041
- 1965: Robert P. Multhauf, "Sal Ammoniac: A Case History in Industrialization", Technology and Culture 6 (1965): 569-86 JSTOR 3101750
- 1962: Silvio A. Bedini, "The Compartmented Cylindrical Clepsydra", Technology and Culture 3 (1962): 115-41 JSTOR 3101437
- 1961: Robert S. Woodbury, "The Legend of Eli Whitney and Interchangeable Parts", Technology and Culture 1 (1960): 235-53 JSTOR 3101392

== See also ==
- List of history awards
