= Fritz Heinemann =

Fritz Heinemann may refer to:

- Fritz Heinemann (artist) (1864–1932), German sculptor
- Fritz Heinemann (philosopher) (1889–1970), German philosopher
