= Rachel Cooper =

Rachel Cooper might refer to:

- Rachel Cooper (philosopher) (born 1974), British philosopher
- Rachel Cooper (presenter) (born 1954), American arts presenter
- Rachel Cooper (soccer) (born 1989), Australian football player
