= Zeine =

Zeine is a surname. Notable people with the surname include:

- Ali Lamine Zeine (born 1965), Nigerien politician and economist

== See also ==
- Zine (surname)
