= Liberalisme =

2009 book edited by Lars Svendsen

Liberalisme: Politisk frihet fra John Locke til Amartya Sen
- Author: Lars Fr. H. Svendsen (ed.)
- Subject: Liberalism
- Genre: Non-fiction
- Publisher: Universitetsforlaget
- Publication date: 2009
- Media type: Print
- Pages: 544/535 pp.
- ISBN: 978-82-15-01267-4
- OCLC: 476980387

Liberalisme: Politisk frihet fra John Locke til Amartya Sen (English: Liberalism: Political Freedom from John Locke to Amartya Sen) is a 2009 Norwegian language anthology edited by Lars Svendsen. The book focuses on the history of liberalism and libertarianism in general, and contains a sample of liberal thinkers from John Locke to Amartya Sen. It was published by Universitetsforlaget with financial support from Civita and Fritt Ord. The book received mixed reviews by critics.

== Background ==
"The purpose of this anthology is to unite some of the most important philosophical writings on political freedom from John Locke to Amartya Sen, so that we can facilitate a larger Norwegian reception of the thinkers that have put down the most important fundamentals of the modern liberal democracy, and of the thinkers that continue the discussion today."

— Civita

Svendsen was 39 years old at the time of publication, teaching philosophy at the University of Bergen. In the Spring of 2007, Civita hosted a debate on the content in the word "Liberalism". It took place at a public breakfast meeting at a café in Oslo.

The anthology was published two years later, in May 2009, also at a breakfast meeting. Norwegian politicians and writers were invited to the debate, among them Cathrine Holst, Henrik Syse and Ove Vanebo.

In a 2009 interview with the Norwegian newspaper Klassekampen, Svendsen stated that he hoped the book would become "Civita's Red Book".

== Content ==
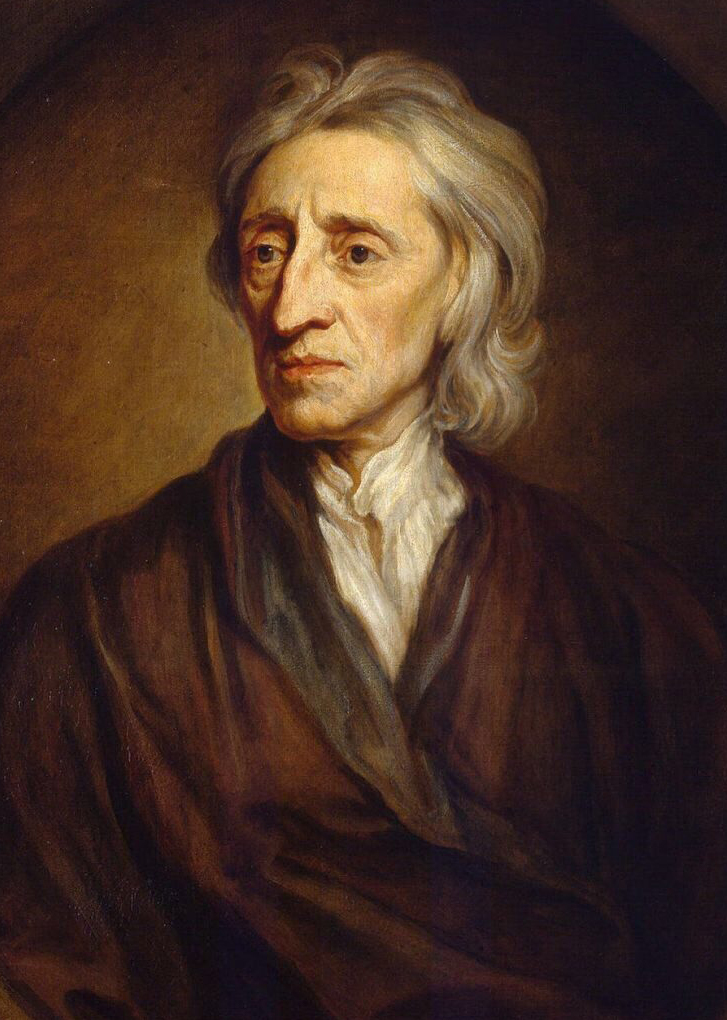
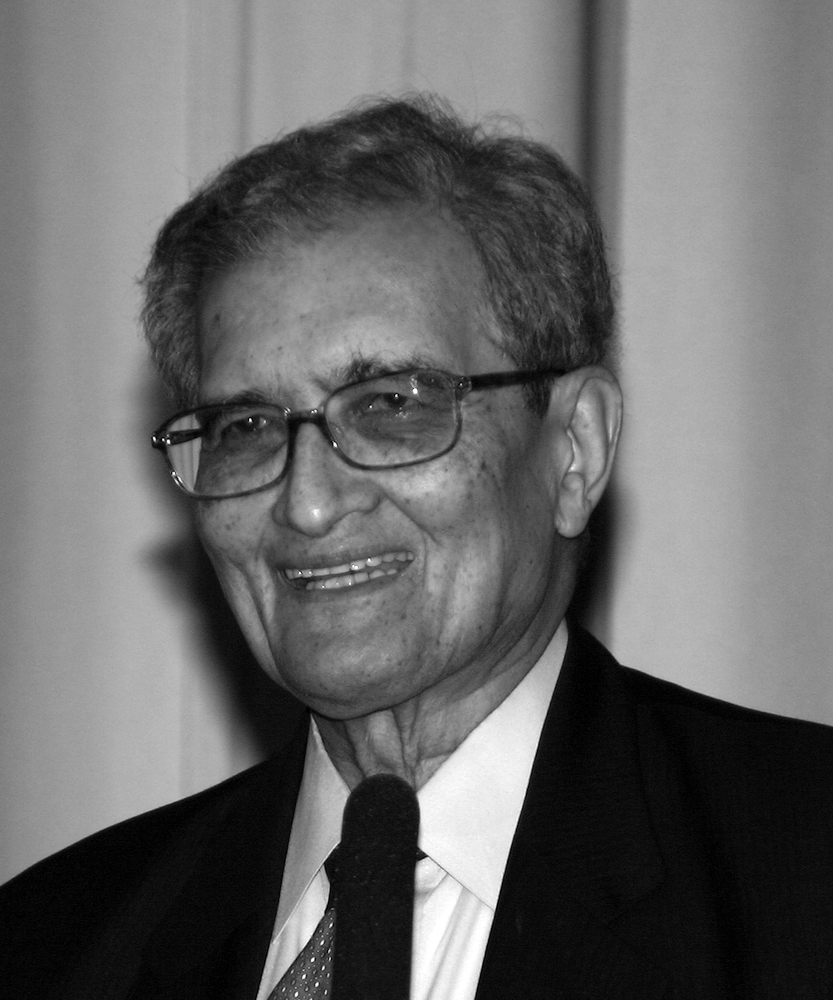
The anthology contained a sample of liberal thinkers from John Locke to Amartya Sen.

The anthology contains entries for various liberal thinkers, among them John Locke, Voltaire, Immanuel Kant, Wilhelm von Humboldt, Mary Wollstonecraft, Alexis de Tocqueville, John Stuart Mill, Ludwig von Mises, Friedrich Hayek, Karl Popper, Isaiah Berlin, John Rawls, Robert Nozick and Amartya Sen. Each entry consists of a short biography of the thinker, as well as a translated work. Svendsen states in the foreword of the book that he tried to select works that had not been translated to Norwegian before.

== Reception ==
The book received much lukewarm criticism from reviewers, many of whom were arguing that the selected persons in the anthology did not fit together. Eirik Høyer Leivestad, reviewing for Bergens Tidende, supported this view, and stated that "crazy" minarchist libertarians like Ludwig von Mises, Robert Nozick and Friedrich Hayek did not belong in a book with "tempered" liberal thinkers like John Locke, Immanuel Kant and John Stuart Mill.

Professor at the University of Oslo, Trond Berg Eriksen, also criticised the anthology for being contradictory, and labelled it "not a peaceful cemetery" in his review in Morgenbladet. He also criticised Svendsen for leaving out prolific liberal thinkers such as Adam Smith, Thomas Jefferson, Raymond Aron, Milton Friedman and Quentin Skinner.
