= Leroy Loemker =

American philosopher and historian (1900–1985)

- Born: Leroy E. Loemker; December 28, 1900; Platteville, Wisconsin, U.S.
- Died: November 28, 1985 (aged 84); Brevard County, Florida, U.S.

Education
- Education: University of Dubuque; Boston University

Philosophical work
- Era: 20th-century philosophy
- Region: Western philosophy
- Institutions: Emory University
- Notable students: Lewis White Beck
- Main interests: History of philosophy, Leibniz, early modern philosophy, philosophy of science
- Notable ideas: Leibniz's metaphysics as a philosophical synthesis of science and religion

Leroy E. Loemker (/ˈloʊmkər/; December 28, 1900 – November 28, 1985) was an American philosopher and historian of philosophy, best known for his scholarship on the works of Gottfried Wilhelm Leibniz. Over the course of his career, Loemker made significant contributions to the study of early modern philosophy and the intellectual history of the seventeenth century and was a mentor to the Kantian scholar Lewis White Beck.

== Biography ==
Leroy Earl Loemker was born December 28, 1900, in Platteville, Wisconsin, the son of German immigrant parents. Loemker graduated from the University of Dubuque in 1921 and Boston University in 1927. He served as a professor of philosophy at Emory University in Atlanta, Georgia, where he was instrumental in developing the institution's philosophy program.

Loemker is credited with mentoring the youthful Kantian scholar Lewis White Beck during his undergraduate years at Emory University in the early 1930s.

== Scholarship on Leibniz ==
Loemker’s enduring legacy lies in his comprehensive work on Gottfried Wilhelm Leibniz. He produced one of the most influential modern English-language translations and compilations of Leibniz’s writings:

G. W. Leibniz: Philosophical Papers and Letters (first edition 1956; revised 1969 and later) This collection brought together a wide selection of Leibniz’s correspondence and philosophical texts, accompanied by Loemker’s commentaries and contextual notes. Its clarity and breadth have made it a standard reference in Anglophone Leibniz scholarship.

In addition to translating and editing primary sources, Loemker also wrote extensively on the historical and intellectual contexts shaping Leibniz’s thought. His work often placed Leibniz in dialogue with developments in science, religion, and political theory in the seventeenth century.

== Major works ==
- Struggle for Synthesis: The Seventeenth-Century Background of Leibniz’s Synthesis of Science, Religion, and State (Harvard University Press, 1972) – In this monograph, Loemker explores the diverse intellectual currents—ranging from Reformation theology to the rise of modern science—that influenced Leibniz’s attempts at systematic synthesis.
- G. W. Leibniz: Philosophical Papers and Letters (editor and translator) – A critical, annotated anthology of Leibniz’s writings, widely regarded as foundational for English-speaking students and scholars of early modern philosophy.
