= Repertorium der Nederlandse Wijsbegeerte =

Inventory of publications in the Netherlands

Repertorium der Nederlandse Wijsbegeerte is one of the major works of Professor Dr. Johannes Jacobus Poortman. This is a four-volume inventory of all publications in the Netherlands or in the Dutch language or by Dutch philosophers on philosophy. After Poortman died in 1970 the work was continued by Wim Klever. Now it can be consulted on-line as the Kennisbank Filosofie Nederland (KFN).

This database contains 36,000 records about philosophy and philosophers in the Netherlands and Dutch speaking Belgium.
