= Zine (surname) =

Zine is a surname. Notable people with the surname include:

- Abdellah Ez Zine, Moroccan paralympic athlete
- Dennis Zine (born 1947), American politician
- Karol Zine, Indian television actress
- Mohammed Chaouki Zine (born 1972), Algerian philosopher and writer
