= Peter Norton (historian) =

American historian

Peter D. Norton (born 1963) is an American historian, academic and author, known for a critical view of societies' relationship with the private car. Norton is an associate professor of history at the University of Virginia. He has received prizes for teaching as well as the Abbot Payson Usher Prize of the Society for the History of Technology for "the best scholarly work published during the preceding three years under the auspices of the Society for the History of Technology".

Norton has written about the history of the car, from a societal U.S. perspective, describing in depth how different groups, like store owners, traffic engineers, the police, pedestrians and newspapers viewed the advent of the car in the early 20th century. He shows that there was considerable resistance to the increasing dominance of cars, not least in the cities. Furthermore, he studies which viewpoint they came from. One conclusion is that the automobile industry seem to have won by appealing to freedom, as their prime argument. His work has been covered in various articles: a 2021 article in the New York Times, "Tech Can't Fix the Problem of Cars", sums up Norton's general position that cars are useful but that car dependency is dysfunctional and unsustainable.

Norton's 2021 book Autorama argues that the current campaign for autonomous cars as the major solution is very similar to earlier campaigns to increase support for a car-based society. For many decades in several waves, the car conglomorate has been selling "the next big thing" as a glorious solution to the public, media and politicians. The current campaign for autonomous cars can be viewed as a continuation of a recognisable strategy.

== Bibliography ==
- Fighting traffic: the dawn of the motor age in the American city (2011)
- Street rivals: Jaywalking and the invention of the motor age street (2007) in the journal Technology and Culture
- Autonorama: The Illusory Promise of High-Tech Driving.
