= Aristotle's Dialogue with Socrates: On the Nicomachean Ethics =

Book by Ronna Burger

- Author: Ronna Burger
- Subject: Ancient Greek philosophy
- Published: 2008
- Publisher: University of Chicago Press
- Pages: 306 pp.
- ISBN: 9780226080543

Aristotle's Dialogue with Socrates: On the Nicomachean Ethics is a book by Ronna Burger in which she explores the influence of Aristotle's Nicomachean Ethics by approaching it as Aristotle's dialogue with the Platonic Socrates. The book was a finalist in philosophy in 2008 PROSE Awards.
