= Viktor Sonnenfeld =

Croatian translator and philosopher

- Born: 21 January 1902; Petrijevci, Austro-Hungarian Empire, (now Croatia)
- Died: 30 March 1969 (aged 67); Vienna, Austria
- Education: University of Zagreb
- Occupations: Translator, philosopher

Viktor D. Sonnenfeld (21 January 1902 – 30 March 1969) was a prominent Croatian translator and philosopher.

== Biography ==
Sonnenfeld was born to a Jewish family in Petrijevci, near Osijek, on 21 January 1902. In Osijek, Sonnenfeld finished elementary school and gymnasium, and in Zagreb and Marseille, he studied philosophy. All his life Sonnenfeld worked and acted in Osijek. He worked at the Osijek daily "Hrvatski list", and for 20 years at "Glas Slavonije" as the editor of the cultural section. Sonnenfeld translated works of German philosophers and writers such as; Immanuel Kant, Georg Wilhelm Friedrich Hegel, Friedrich Nietzsche and others. Overall, from German to Croatian, he translated 940 titles. City and University Library in Osijek has stored Sonnenfeld personal library, a legacy of the 3345 book. Sonnenfeld retired and died in 1969, and was buried at Jewish part of the cemetery Sv. Ana, Osijek.

== Translations ==
From German to Croatian:

- Filozofija povijesti (Lectures on the Philosophy of History, 1951)
- Dvije rasprave (Prolegomena to Any Future Metaphysics, 1953)
- Fenomenologija duha (The Phenomenology of Spirit, 1955)
- Odabrane filozofske rasprave (Die Bestimmung des Menschen, 1956)
