= 1980 in philosophy =

1980 in philosophy

== Events ==
- November 16 - Louis Althusser strangles his wife, Hélène Rytman, to death, following a period of mental instability.

== Publications ==
- David Bohm, Wholeness and the Implicate Order
- Ronna Burger, Plato's Phaedrus: A Defense of a Philosophic Art of Writing
- Donald Davidson, Essays on Actions and Events
- Umberto Eco, The Name of the Rose
- Peter Geach and Max Black, Translations from the Philosophical Writings of Gottlob Frege
- Saul Kripke, Naming and Necessity
- George Lakoff and Mark Johnson, Metaphors We Live By
- Jeremy Rifkin and Ted Howard, Entropy: A New World View (with an afterword by Nicholas Georgescu-Roegen)
- John Searle, "Minds, Brains, and Programs"

== Births ==
- October 2 - Henry Bugalho

== Deaths ==
- March 18 - Erich Fromm (born 1900)
- March 26 - Roland Barthes (born 1915)
- April 9 - Muhammad Baqir al-Sadr, executed (born 1935)
- April 15 - Jean-Paul Sartre (born 1905)
- July 1 - C. P. Snow (born 1905)
- July 4 - Gregory Bateson (born 1904)
- August 10 - Gareth Evans (born 1946)
- September 4 - Walter Kaufmann (born 1921)
- September 16 - Jean Piaget (born 1896)
- December 31 - Marshall McLuhan (born 1911)
