= Gonzalo Rodriguez-Pereyra =

British philosopher (born 1969)

Gonzalo Rodriguez-Pereyra (born 7 August 1969) is an Argentinian philosopher. He is currently a lecturer at the University of Oxford, where he has the title of Professor of Metaphysics, and a Tutorial Fellow at Oriel College.

Rodriguez-Pereyra has previously been a Research Fellow at Churchill College, University of Cambridge, Lecturer at the University of Edinburgh, Lecturer at the University of Oxford and Tutorial Fellow at Hertford College, and Professor at the University of Nottingham and Universidad Torcuato Di Tella. He earned his first degree from the National University of Córdoba, his MPhil from Peterhouse, Cambridge and PhD from Churchil College, Cambridge, where he was a student of Hugh Mellor.

His interests are primarily in Metaphysics and the philosophy of Leibniz. His work on resemblance nominalism provides a response to that of David Malet Armstrong and grounds resemblance relations in the sort of modal realism expressed in On the Plurality of Worlds by David Lewis.

== Selected publications ==
=== Books ===
- Resemblance Nominalism: A Solution to the Problem of Universals. Oxford: Oxford University Press, 2002. ISBN 0199243778
- Real Metaphysics: Essays in honour of D. H. Mellor (co-edited with Hallvard Lillehammer). London: Routledge, 2003. ISBN 0415249813
- Leibniz's Principle of Identity of Indiscernibles. Oxford: Oxford University Press, 2014. ISBN 9780198712664

=== Articles ===
- 'Leibniz's argument for the Principle of Identity of Indiscernibles in Primary Truths', in M. Carrara, A.-M. Nunziante, and G. Tomasi (eds.) Individuals, Minds and Bodies: Themes from Leibniz, Stuttgart : Steiner, 2004, pp. 49–59.
- 'Truthmaking and the Slingshot', in U. Meixner (Ed.), Metaphysics in the Post-Metaphysical Age, Wien: Verlag Hölder-Pichler-Tempsky, 2001.
- 'What is the Problem of Universals?', Mind, vol. 109 (April 2000), pp. 255–273.
