= Socratic Citizenship =

- Author: Dana Villa
- Subject: Political philosophy, classics
- Published: 2001 (Princeton University Press)
- Pages: 392
- ISBN: 978-0-691-08693-4

Socratic Citizenship is a philosophy book by Dana Villa that proposes how contemporary citizenship can draw from Socrates' dissident citizenship in Athens. He follows the references to Socrates in the works of Hannah Arendt, John Stuart Mill, Friedrich Nietzsche, Leo Strauss, and Max Weber.
