= Paul Bakker =

Controversial professor in medieval and renaissance philosophy

- Citizenship: The Netherlands
- Occupation: University professor
- Title: Professor

Academic background
- Education: Radboud University
- Thesis: La raison et le miracle: les doctrines eucharistiques (1999)
- Doctoral advisor: H.A.G. Braakhuis, Z. Kaluza and M.J.F.M. Hoenen

Academic work
- Era: Contemporary philosophy
- Discipline: History of philosophy
- Sub-discipline: Medieval and renaissance philosophy
- Institutions: Radboud University
- Main interests: Medieval commentaries on Aristotle, Natural philosophy, Philosophy of mind

Paul Bakker is a professor in medieval and renaissance philosophy at Radboud University.

== Academic research ==
Bakkers' research is mainly focused on medieval commentaries on Aristotle's Physics and De Anima and the complex relations between philosophical and theological arguments presented therein. He has also published within the discipline of the philosophy of mind on topics such as 'the relation between body, soul, and mind, theories of the soul's faculties, and views of sense perception'.

== Campus ban ==
In 2020, Radboud University revealed that an investigation into social safety would be initiated, of which Bakker would be the subject. The investigation concluded that he was guilty of having committed 'inappropriate behaviour'. As a result of this conclusion, his promotion to dean was cancelled and he received a campus ban lasting one semester.
