= Plato's Phaedrus: A Defense of a Philosophic Art of Writing =

Book by Ronna Burger

- First edition
- Author: Ronna Burger
- Subject: Ancient Greek philosophy
- Published: 1980
- Publisher: University of Alabama Press
- Pages: 160
- ISBN: 9780817300142

Plato's Phaedrus: A Defense of a Philosophic Art of Writing is a book by Ronna Burger, in which Burger provides a philosophical analysis of the Phaedrus by Plato. It has been translated into Chinese (Huaxia Press, 2016).
