= Khoren Sargsian =

- Born: December 2, 1891; Shusha,
- Died: April 4, 1970 (aged 78); Yerevan,
- Citizenship: Armenian
- Education: Saint Petersburg University
- Known for: Director of the Literature Institute of the Armenian SA from 1943 to 1947
- Scientific career
- Fields: writer, critic, doctor of philology, and professor

Khoren Sargsian (Armenian: Խորեն Սարգսյան; 1891–1970) was an Armenian writer, critic, doctor of philology, and professor. He graduated from Saint Petersburg University and later went on to become the director of the Literature Institute of the Armenian SA from 1943 to 1947. He authored many publications on famous Armenian figures such as Vahan Terian, Levon Shant, Stepan Zoryan, and Sayat-Nova.

== Sources ==
- Armenian Concise Encyclopedia, Ed. by acad. K. Khudaverdian, Yerevan, 1990, p. 484
- "ZARK Foundation - Khoren Sargsyan". zarkfoundation.com.
