= Thomas F. Green =

American educational theorist and philosopher

Thomas Franklin Green (8 February 1927 – 20 December 2006) was an American educational theorist and philosopher.

== Biography ==
Born on 8 February 1927, Thomas Franklin Green was raised in Lincoln, Nebraska. His parents worked as civil engineers and writers. He studied political science and philosophy at the University of Nebraska, graduating in 1948. Green elected to pursue a master's degree in philosophy, which he finished in 1949 at Nebraska. He subsequently earned a doctorate from Cornell University. Green began teaching at the South Dakota School of Mines and Technology and furthered his career at Michigan State University prior to joining Syracuse University in 1964. Four years later, he was awarded a Guggenheim fellowship. Green was appointed Margaret O. Slocum Professor of Education in 1980 and retired from Syracuse in 1993. He died in Jamesville, New York, at the age of 79 on 20 December 2006.
