= Karin Bijsterveld =

Dutch historian (born 1961)

Karin Theda Bijsterveld (born 12 October 1961) is a Dutch historian. She is a professor of Science, Technology, and Modern Culture at Maastricht University. Bijsterveld is active in the field of sound studies. The Royal Netherlands Academy of Arts and Sciences has called her one of the founders of the field.

Bijsterveld was director of the Netherlands Graduate Research School of Science, Technology and Modern Culture from 2005 to 2010. In 2009 she won a Vici grant by the Netherlands Organisation for Scientific Research. This allowed her to do research on the project "Sonic Skills: Sound and Listening in the Development of Science, Technology and Medicine (1920-now)".

Bijsterveld was elected a member of the Royal Netherlands Academy of Arts and Sciences in 2016.
