= Lars Svendsen =

Norwegian philosopher

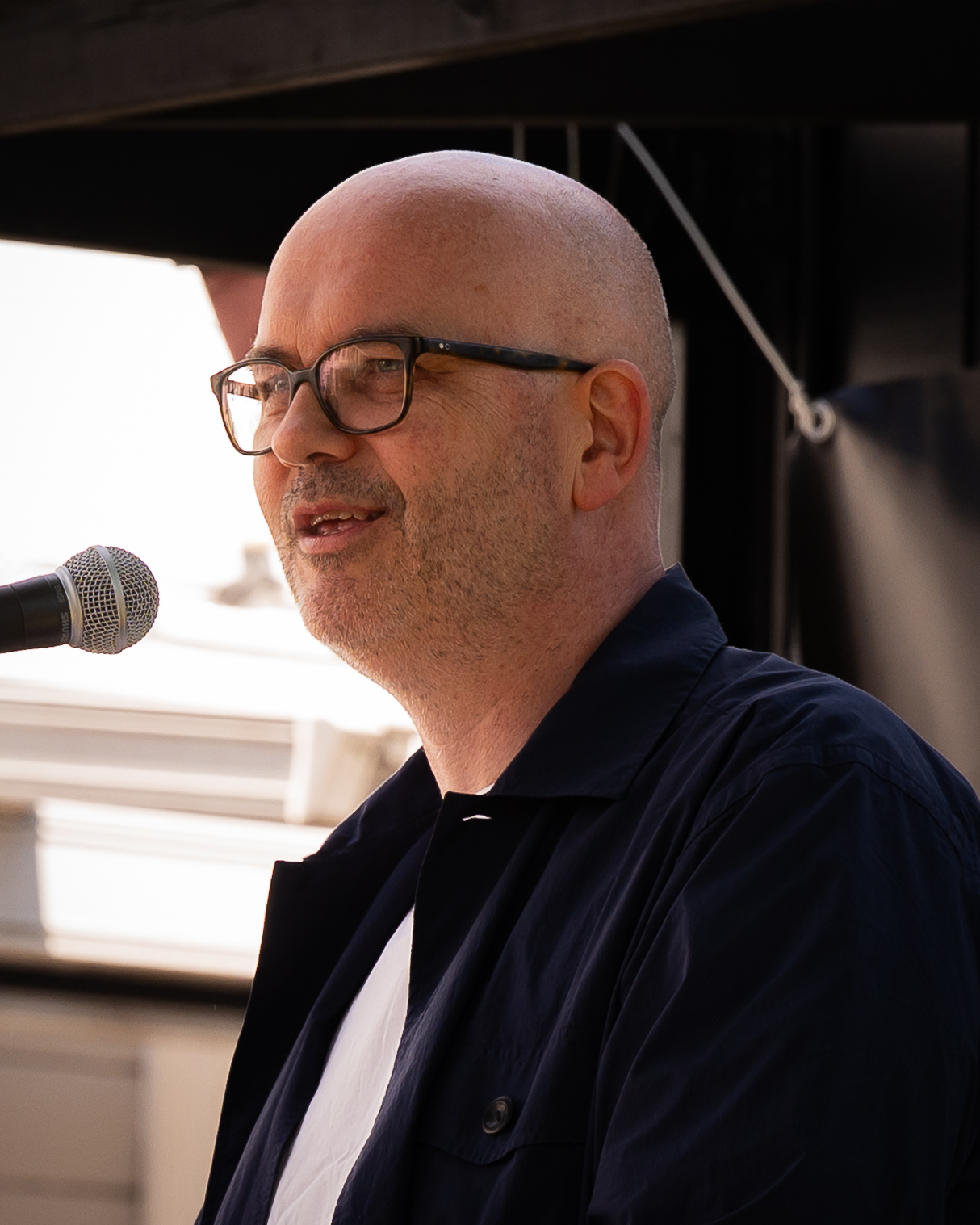
Lars Svendsen in 2023

Lars Fredrik Händler Svendsen (born 16 September 1970) is a Norwegian philosopher.

== Biography ==
Lars Svendsen is a professor in the Department of Philosophy at the University of Bergen in Norway. He is the author of several books, including A Philosophy of Boredom (2005), Fashion: A Philosophy (2006), A Philosophy of Fear (2008), Work (2008), and A Philosophy of Freedom (2014).

== Bibliography ==
- 2005: A Philosophy of Boredom
- 2006: Fashion: A Philosophy
- 2008: A Philosophy of Fear
- 2008: Work
- 2009: Liberalisme (editor)
- 2010: A Philosophy of Evil
- 2014: A Philosophy of Freedom
- 2017: A Philosophy of Loneliness
- 2019: Understanding Animals: Philosophy for Dog and Cat Lovers
- 2022: A Philosophy of Lying
- 2024: Stupidity, Idiocy and Stupid Idiots
