= Charles E. Osgood =

American psychologist (1916–1991)

- Born: November 20, 1916; Somerville, Massachusetts
- Died: September 15, 1991 (aged 74)
- Education: Brookline High School; Dartmouth College (B.A.); Yale University (Ph.D.)
- Known for: Semantic differential
- Title: President of the American Psychological Association (1963–1964)
- Spouse: Cynthia Thornton (married 1939)
- Children: 2
- Awards: Award for Distinguished Scientific Contributions (1960); Kurt Lewin Memorial Award (1971); Guggenheim Fellowship (1955 and 1972)
- Scientific career
- Fields: Psycholinguistics; Experimental psychology; Social psychology; Semantics

Charles Egerton Osgood (20 November 1916 – 15 September 1991) was an American psychologist and professor at the University of Illinois. He was known for his research on behaviourism versus cognitivism, semantics (he introduced the term "semantic differential"), cross-culturalism, psycholinguistic theory, and peace studies. He is credited with helping in the early development of psycholinguistics. Charles Osgood was recognized as a distinguished and highly honored psychologist throughout his career.

== Early life and education ==
Charles Egerton Osgood was born in Somerville, Massachusetts, on 20 November 1916. His father was a manager at the Jordan Marsh department store in Boston. Osgood described having an unhappy childhood as his parents were divorced by the time he was six. When he was ten, his aunt, Grace Osgood, gave him a copy of Roget's Thesaurus. This gift was described by Osgood an “object of aesthetic pleasure”, sparking his fascination with words and their meanings.

Osgood attended Brookline High School, where he began writing for the school newspaper, and eventually founded a school magazine. Osgood attended Dartmouth College where he intended to graduate and work as a writer for newspapers. During his second year, he enrolled in a class taught by Theodore Karwoski, thus inspiring him to switch his major in order to pursue a degree in psychology.

Charles Osgood earned his B.A. in 1939 from Dartmouth, and in the same year, married Cynthia Luella Thornton. Osgood then went on to study at Yale University where he completed his Ph.D. in 1945. During his time at Yale, he worked as an assistant for Robert Sears, and collaborated with the likes of Arnold Gesell, Walter Miles, Charles Morris, and Irvin Child. However, the person with the greatest influence on his career and future work was Clark Hull. Though Osgood was heavily influenced through working alongside Hull; he stated the experience was one of the determining reasons for him pursuing a career as a researcher, rather than a clinician.

== Career ==
Osgood was a social psychologist interested in psycholinguistics, and research. He was an instructor at Yale from 1942 to 1946, where he earned his doctorate degree. He worked for the U.S. Office of Scientific Research and Development 1946 to 1947, serving as a research associate that worked on training of B-29 gunners. During this period, Osgood also worked as an assistant professor of psychology at the University of Connecticut from 1946 to 1949. Osgood then went on to become an associate professor at the University of Connecticut from 1949 to 1952, and eventually as professor of psychology and communications from 1952 onward. He completed a majority of his work during his time at the University of Illinois, Urbana, which, along with the Institute of Communications, funded many of his works. Osgood would often submit himself to his own experiments get a better grasp of what his subjects may experience. At Illinois, Osgood was active in aiding in the hiring processes, and even arranged interviews for women at the university during times when women were facing sexism in the field of psychology. From 1957 to 1965, Osgood served as the Director of the Institute of Communications Research, and starting in 1965, he became the Director of the Center for Advanced Study. He was also elected as the director of the Centre of Comparative Psycholinguistics at the university from 1963 to 1982.

In addition to this, Osgood completed a fellowship at the Center for Advanced Study in the Behavioral Sciences at Stanford University from 1958 to 1959; and was given an honorary doctorate from the Dartmouth College in 1962. Osgood also acted as a visiting professor at the University of Hawaii from 1964 to 1965.

== Death and unfinished research ==
Charles Osgood's career ended somewhat abruptly and prematurely after developing an acute case of Korsakoff's syndrome. He was left with severe anterograde amnesia, but recovered well enough to continue working, though in a much lighter capacity as he was restricted to working from home.

Toward the end of his career, Osgood decided to devote his time to three main projects. With the help of other scholars, Osgood intended on completing the interpretation of data obtained from the cross-cultural project; along with publishing 2 books, one of them, a summary of his theory of psycholinguistics (to be titled Toward an Abstract Performance Grammar), and the other on international affairs. Osgood was never able to complete any of these due to the effects of his illness, which, after a few years, forced him into complete retirement, until his death on September 15, 1991.

== Works and contributions ==
Osgood worked on many studies mainly on cross-cultural studies in different aspects. He devoted most of his time to studies regarding Social Psychology, Cognitive-Behaviour Psychology and also on Psycholinguistics. He was renowned for four of his major works and these works have pathed the way for future researchers by facilitating them for validating their works with researches tools proposed by Osgood, also promoting international research studies on cross-cultural topics.

=== Mediation theory ===
Osgood's Mediation theory—The psycholinguistics foundations in human behaviour and communication process.

Osgood proposed the mediation theory which suggested that the physical stimuli exist in our environment have elicited our internal response and lead to our interpretation of the underlined meaning of those presented stimulus. With our 3-level of thought process, we will have our internal stimuli, which are our thoughts and emotion towards the physical stimulus and the internal stimulus will bring up the outward response(s), which are visible feedbacks to the physical stimulus in the environment. Osgood also suggested that by measuring the visible outward response we can determine the intensity of emotion that has been brought up by the physical stimulus.

Osgood also proposed a two-stage Meditation learning theory in the language acquisition process in 1954. The theory suggested that the use of language is an expression of mental process which is related to the cultural context of an individual. It suggested that the language acquisition process involves coding and decoding of the psychological structure within the language. His research in language, cognition, and neurophysiology had provided insight into future studies about multilingual language acquisition with a cross-cultural framework.

=== Semantic technique – the cross-cultural research tool ===
Osgood introduced a semantic technique for researchers to measure the connotative meaning of objects and concepts from the human Ecology aspect. The Semantic differential technique focused on three affective dimensions of Evaluation, Potency, and Activity (E-P-A) to evaluate social and cultural related concepts in a valid and reliable way. The practice of the semantic differential technique is being used broadly in social and behavioural science studies.

=== Development of the atlas of affective meanings (1960s–1980s) ===
To further improve the validity of the semantic differential technique, Osgood took the lead to develop the Atlas of Affective Meanings project from the 1960s to the 1980s. The project is indices of the affective meanings with 20 basic and derived measures of over 600 functionally equivalent concepts by analyzing over 30 language/culture communities from Mexico, Brazil, Japan, Hong Kong, Thailand, India, Iran, Lebanon, Israel, Turkey, Greece, Yugoslavia, Italy, Spain, Portugal, France, German, Netherlands, Finland, etc.

With the development of the Atlas, affective meanings are used as universal functional markers with the E-P-A dimension and they have high validity in measuring indigenous and cross-cultural comparisons. These affective meanings are being widely applied on social-cultural studies on social dynamics, international communication, mental illness stigma and connotation of racial concepts, etc. It has a great contribution to the development of cross-cultural researches and also international communications.

=== Graduated reciprocation in tension reduction (GRIT) strategies ===
With the rise of the nuclear arms race that was brought up by the United States and the Soviet Union during the Cold War. Osgood proposed the GRIT strategies (Graduated Reciprocation in Tension reduction) in 1962, which means to provide a psychological approach to resolve the tension brought up from the nuclear arm race between the two superpowers. The GRIT strategies are based on the concept of reciprocity and used to rebuild a negotiation platform for two parties who are deadlocked. The introduction of GRIT strategies not only reduced the tension between the two superpowers but also has contributed to solving various social, cultural and political conflicts worldwide.

== Honors and awards ==
Charles Osgood earned many distinctions and honors within the field of psychology throughout his distinguished career. In 1960, the American Psychological Association presented Osgood with the Award for Distinguished Scientific Contributions; three years later, Osgood was elected as president of the American Psychological Association. In addition to this, the Society for the Psychological Study of Social Issues presented Charles E. Osgood with the Kurt Lewin Memorial Award in 1971. In the following year, he was elected to the National Academy of Sciences, and as president of the Peace Science Society in 1976. Osgood was also the recipient of the Guggenheim Fellowship twice, in 1955 and again in 1972 in the field of philosophy.
