= Christian Lotz =

German-American philosopher (born 1970)

- Born: 21 February 1970 (age 56); Wuppertal, West Germany

Philosophical work
- Era: Contemporary philosophy
- Region: Western philosophy
- School: Continental; Marxist philosophy; Critical theory; Phenomenology
- Main interests: Aesthetics; Social philosophy; Political philosophy; Continental philosophy
- Website: christianlotz.info

Christian Lotz (born 21 February 1970) is a German-American professor of philosophy at Michigan State University. Lotz's work primarily focuses on 19th and 20th Century European philosophy (esp. German philosophy), continental aesthetics, critical theory, Marx, and contemporary European political philosophy.

== Academic career ==
Lotz received his M.A. in philosophy, sociology, and art history from Otto Friedrich University in Bamberg in 1997 and a Ph.D. in philosophy from Philipps University of Marburg in 2002. He was Research Fellow from 2000 to 2002 at Emory University. Lotz taught at Seattle University and The University of Kansas, and held DAAD visiting positions at Brandenburg University of Technology in 2011 and 2013.

== Works ==
- Continental Philosophy and the History of Philosophy, co-ed. with Antonio Calcagno, Lanham: Rowman & Littlefield 2023
- The Art of Gerhard Richter. Hermeneutics, Images, Meaning, London: Bloomsbury Press 2015 (paperback, 2017)
- The Capitalist Schema. Time, Money, and the Culture of Abstraction, Lanham: Lexington Books 2014 (paperback, 2016)
- Christian Lotz zu Karl Marx: Das Maschinenfragment, Hamburg: Laika Verlag 2014
- Ding und Verdinglichung. Technik- und Sozialphilosophie nach Heidegger und der kritischen Theorie, Christian Lotz, Hans Friesen, Markus Wolf, and Jakob Meier (eds.), München: Fink 2012
- From Affectivity to Subjectivity. Husserl’s Phenomenology Revisited, London: Palgrave 2008
- Vom Leib zum Selbst. Kritische Analysen zu Husserl and Heidegger, Freiburg: Alber 2005
- Phenomenology and the Non-Human Animal. At the Limits of Experience, Christian Lotz and Corinne Painter (eds.), Contributions to Phenomenology, Dordrecht: Springer 2007
- Erinnerung. Philosophische Positionen, Perspektiven und Probleme, Christian Lotz, T. Wolf, and Walther Christoph Zimmerli (eds.), München: Fink 2004
- Subjektivität - Verantwortung - Wahrheit. Neue Aspekte der Phänomenologie Edmund Husserls, Christian Lotz and D. Carr (eds.), Frankfurt/M.: Lang 2002.
- Philosophie als Denkwerkzeug. Zur Aktualität transzendentalphilosophischer Argumentation, Christian Lotz, M. Götze, K. Pollok, and D. Wildenburg (eds.), Würzburg: Königshausen & Neumann
