= Johannes Jacobus Poortman =

Dutch philosophy and psychology professor

Johannes Jacobus Poortman (April 26, 1896 in Rotterdam – December 21, 1970 in The Hague), studied philosophy and psychology at Groningen University under Professor Gerardus Heymans. In 1919 he received his Master of Arts; many years later he would also earn a Ph.D. He was also a theosophist.

== Biography ==
Poortman studied at the universities of Hamburg, Geneva, the Sorbonne in Paris and at Vienna. From 1932 to 1938 he was member of the Council of the Dutch Society for Psychical Research. From 1958 to 1966 he was a Professor of metaphysics at the University of Leiden. After he retired his chair was successively occupied by Prof. Dubbink, Prof. van Vledder and Prof. Gerding.

Poortman was the maker of the Repertory of Dutch philosophers, Repertorium der Nederlandse Wijsbegeerte, which can be consulted on line at the site of the Leiden University.

He formulated the idea of a hylic pluralism (in Dutch hylisch pluralisme) of the plurality of matter, a model of the universe in which science and metaphysics are no longer contradictory. This vision was explained in his four volume work, Vehicles of Consciousness.

== Poortmans categories ==
Poortman distinguished six different metaphysical views of the world, which he named from Alpha to Zeta.

1. Alpha: monistic materialism, the view that only one kind of stuff, i.e. matter, ultimately exists in this universe.
2. Beta: the view that only matter exists, but that there are different kinds of matter (hylic pluralism), specifically that God and other spiritual beings are created of a finer kind of matter, not visible to our scientific instruments.
3. Gamma: that only matter exists, with the exception of one single entity which is not material. This entity may be God, Brahman, etc. This is the view held by Poortman himself.
4. Delta: the view that two separate kinds of material and one kind of spiritual, immaterial entity exists, for example the early Christian and Gnostic belief that man was made of body, soul and spirit, where the first two are different forms of matter and the spirit is immaterial.
5. Epsilon: a view in which matter and mind are totally separate things. This view was for example held by René Descartes in his cogito ergo sum statement, see mind dualism.
6. Zeta: monistic idealism or illusionism, where matter is seen as some kind of emanation of God or another spiritual being. Especially this classification applies to the Brahman of the Hinduism.
