= Philip Wheelwright =

American philosopher and classical scholar (1901–1970)

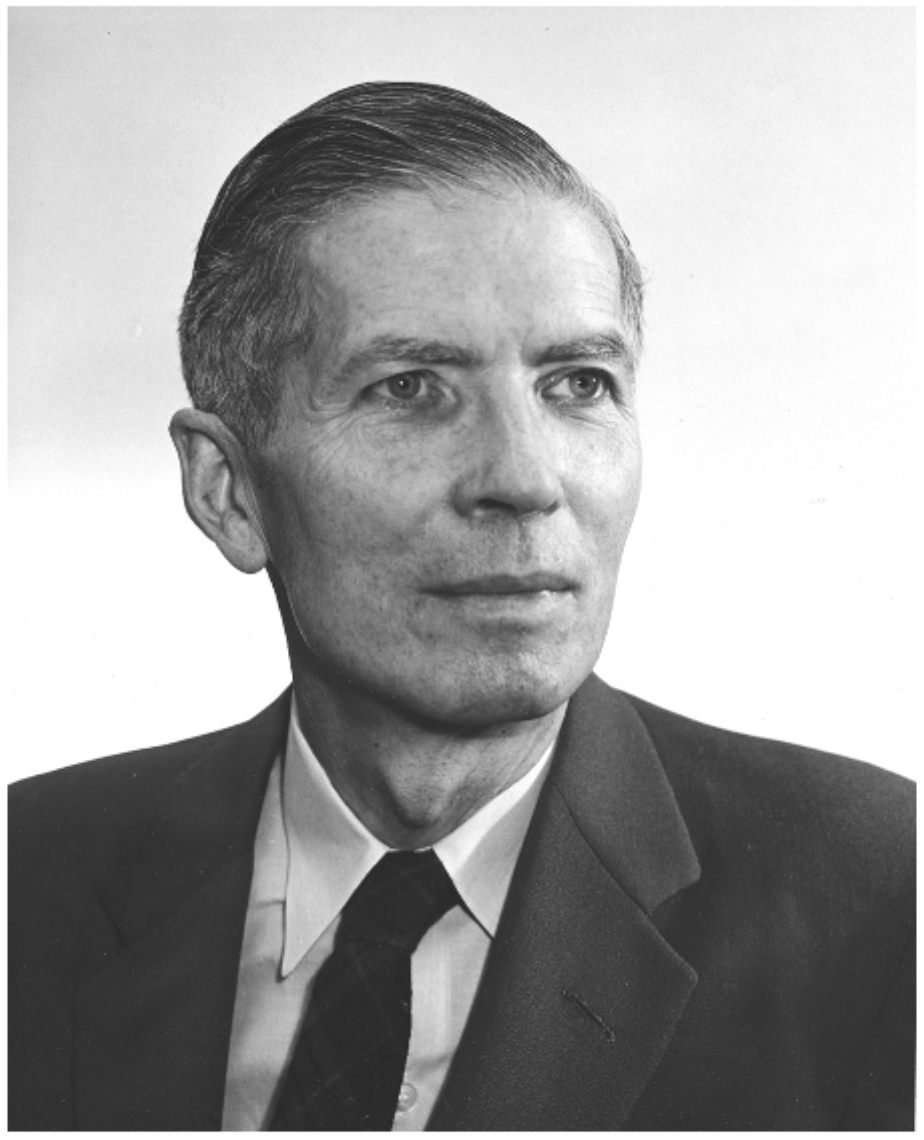
Philip Wheelwright, 1901–1970

Philip Ellis Wheelwright (July 6, 1901 – January 6, 1970) was an American philosopher, classical scholar and literary theorist. He was born in Elizabeth, New Jersey, the son of a stockbroker, and died in Santa Barbara, California. Wheelwright was educated at Princeton University, with a B.A. in 1921 and a Ph.D. in 1924 with his dissertation "The Concepts of Liberty and Contingency in the Philosophy of Charles Renouvier," the French Kantian philosopher who so influenced William James.

Wheelwright taught at New York University from 1927 to 1935, while from 1930 to 1933 editing the journal Symposium, an avant-garde review of literary criticism. After two years devoted to his own writing, in 1937 he returned to teaching as professor of philosophy at Dartmouth College, on whose faculty he remained until 1953. In 1966 he retired from the University of California, Riverside, where he had been a professor since 1954, a founding charter member of the faculty of UC Riverside's undergraduate College of Letters and Science (now dubbed the College of Humanities, Arts, and Social Sciences). Wheelwright also taught at Pomona College for one semester in 1953. He was known as an eloquent lecturer.

Wheelwright published in 1935 A Critical Introduction to Ethics, an introductory textbook to philosophical ethics; in the same year and for the general public, he published Aristotle, a translation "into the English of today" of selections from seven of the Greek philosopher's most important books: Natural Science, The Metaphysics, Zoology, Psychology, The Nicomachean Ethics, On Statecraft, and The Art of Poetry. But Professor Wheelwright is best known for works in the field of literary criticism, The Burning Fountain: a Study in the Language of Symbolism (1954) and Metaphor and Reality (1962). He also published a book on early Greek philosophy, The Presocratics (1966).
