= Georgia M. Green =

American linguist and academic

Georgia M. Green is an American linguist and academic. She is an emeritus professor at the University of Illinois at Urbana-Champaign. Her research has focused on pragmatics, speaker intention, word order and meaning. She has been an advisory editor for several linguistics journals or publishers and she serves on the usage committee for the American Heritage Dictionary.

== Academic career ==
Green earned her PhD in Linguistics from the University of Chicago in 1971. She was a fellow at the Center for Advanced Study in the Behavioral Sciences at Stanford University in 1978-79. She is a Professor Emeritus of Linguistics at the University of Illinois at Urbana-Champaign where she was also a member of the Beckman Institute Cognitive Science Group.

Green has served as a peer reviewer or advisory editor for journals including Language, Linguistics and Philosophy, Natural Language and Linguistic Theory, Law and Social Inquiry, and Discourse Processes and publishers including Academic Press. Since 1997 she has served on the usage panel for the American Heritage Dictionary.

== Research ==
Green's research explores areas of pragmatics that show the effect of speaker intention on language interpretation, including word order effects of information structure, discourse particles, and language applications to judicial contexts. Her first book on meaning in language was respected for daring to use example sentences with real political topics. Her book on natural language understanding was noted as admirably capturing the fact that “pragmatics is inherently interactive, that the central notions of the field... are properties of speakers and hearers, not of words or sentences.”

== Selected publications ==
=== Books ===
- Green, Georgia M. and Jerry L. Morgan. 2001. Practical guide for Syntactic Analysis. Stanford: Center for the Study of Language and Information.
- Green, Georgia M. 1996. 2nd ed. Pragmatics and Natural Language Understanding. Lawrence Erlbaum Associates.
- Green, Georgia M., Jerry L. Morgan, and Jennifer Cole. (eds.) 1995. Linguistics and Computation. CSLI Lecture Notes 52. Stanford, CA: CSLI Publications.
- Green, Georgia M. 1973. Semantics and Syntactic Regularity. Cambridge University Press.

=== Articles and chapters ===
- Green, Georgia M. "Elementary principles of HPSG." Non-transformational Syntax: a guide to current models. Oxford: Wiley-Blackwell, 2011. 9-53.
- Green, Georgia M. "Modelling grammar growth: universal grammar without innate principles or parameters." Non-transformational Syntax: a guide to current models. Ed. Kersti Borjars and Robert Borsley. Oxford: Wiley-Blackwell, 2011. 378-403.
- Morgan, Jerry L., and Georgia M. Green. "Why verb agreement is not the poster child for any formal principle." Polymorphous linguistics: Jim McCawley's legacy. Ed. Salikoko S. Mufwene, Elaine J. Francis, and Rebecca S. Wheeler. Cambridge: MIT Press, 2005. 455-478.
- Green, Georgia M. "The nature of pragmatic information." Grammatical interfaces in HPSG. Ed. R. Cann, C. Grover, and P Miller. Stanford: Center for the Study of Language and Information, 2000. 113-138.
- Levine, Robert D., and Georgia M. Green. "Introduction." Studies in contemporary phrase structure grammar. Cambridge: Cambridge University Press, 1999.
- Cunningham, Clark D., Judith N. Levi, Georgia M. Green, and Jeffrey P. Kaplan. "Plain meaning and hard cases." Rev. of The Language of Judges, by Lawrence M Solan. Yale Law Review 103.6 (1994): 1561-1625.
- Green, Georgia M. "Colloquial and literary uses of inversions." Spoken and written language: Exploring orality and literacy. Ed. Deborah Tannen. Ablex, 1982. 119-153.
- Green, Georgia M., and Jerry L. Morgan. "Pragmatics, grammar and discourse." Radical Pragmatics. Ed. Peter Cole. Academic Press, 1981. 167-181.
- Green, Georgia M. "Main clause phenomena in subordinate clauses." Language 52.2 (1976): 382-397.
- Green, Georgia M. "How to get people to do things with words: The whimperative question." Syntax and Semantics 3: Speech Acts. Ed. Jerry L. Morgan and Peter Cole. Academic Press, 1975. 107–141.
- Green, Georgia M. "A syntactic syncretism in English and French." Issues in Linguistics: Papers in Honor of Henry and Reneé Kahane. Ed. Braj B. Kachru. University of Illinois Press, 1973. 257–278.
- Green, Georgia M. "Some observations on the syntax and semantics of instrumental verbs." Papers from the Eighth Regional Meeting, Chicago Linguistic Society. Chicago Linguistic Society, 1972. 83-97.
