= Erik Del Bufalo =

Venezuelan philosopher and professor

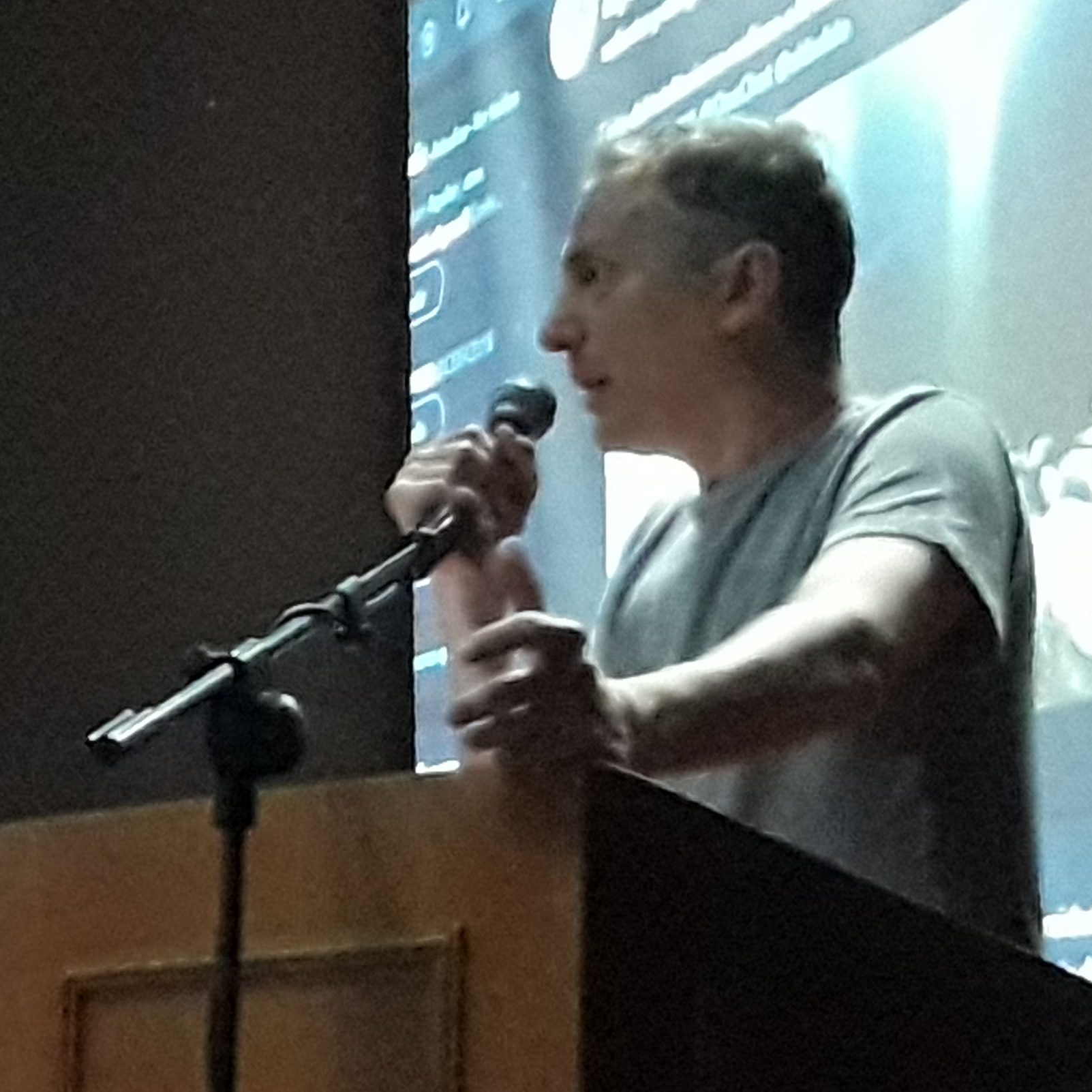
- Born: 1972 (age 53–54); Miami, United States
- Education: Paris Nanterre University
- Occupations: Researcher, philoshoper, university professor
- Employer: Simón Bolívar University

Erik Del Bufalo (born 1972) is a Venezuelan philosopher and university professor at Simón Bolívar University in Caracas.

== Career ==
Erik graduated with a doctor in philosophy from the Paris Nanterre University. Since 2002, he is a member of the International No-Philosophical Organization, established in Paris by philosopher François Laruelle, and in 2012 he co-founded the Centro de Investigaciones Críticas y Sociculturales (CICS), part of the Instituto De Altos Estudios de América Latina (IAEL) in the Universidad Simón Bolívar (USB). Del Búfalo has participated in the Cisneros Foundation seminary in 2014, 2017 and 2018, and has written in several national and international magazines. In 2018 Erik was granted an award by the Simón Bolívar University for his educational work, period 2016-2017, along with eight other professors. Del Búfalo is also known for his activism on social networks such as Twitter.

== Works published ==
- Deleuze et Laruelle. De la schizoanalyse à la non-philosophie (París, Kimé, 2003)
- El rostro lugar de nadie (Mercantil Foundation, 2006)
- La política encarnada (coauthor with Luis Duno-Gottberg, 2015)
- El mal y el animal, impotencia y profundidad a partir de una visión de Clarice Lispector
- Proyecto Helicoide y los misterios de la modernidad venezolana
