= David Ross Fryer =

David Ross Fryer is an American ethicist and Jewish philosopher working in phenomenology, queer theory, Africana thought, existentialism (in particular Black Existentialism), contemporary Jewish thought, and psychoanalytic theory.

== Education ==
Fryer completed a B.A. (honors) in Intellectual History and Religious Studies at The University of Pennsylvania, studying under Alan Charles Kors and Stephen Dunning; post-graduate research in Philosophy at The University of Edinburgh, studying under Vincent Hope; and an A.M and Ph.D. in Contemporary Religious Thought and Gender Studies at Brown University, studying under Lewis Gordon, Wendell Dietrich, and Elizabeth Weed.

== Career ==
Fryer's first book, The Intervention of the Other: Ethical Subjectivity in Levinas and Lacan, received positive reviews in both philosophical and psychoanalytic circles. Their second book, Thinking Queerly: Race, Sex, Gender, and the Ethics of Identity and the work within it has both been cited by prominent academics and received attention in the queer blogosphere. They have been affiliated with the Institute for the Study of Race and Social Thought and the Center for Afro-Judaic Studies, both at Temple University. They are a founding member of the Phenomenology Roundtable. They have been a long-time collaborator with Professors Lewis Gordon and Jane Gordon (University of Connecticut). They have taught at institutions including the University of Pennsylvania, Temple University, Drexel University, and, most recently, Lehigh University and Muhlenberg College. They suffer from a genetic condition that required a heart transplant in 2021.
