= Carlos Astrada =

Argentine philosopher (1894–1970)

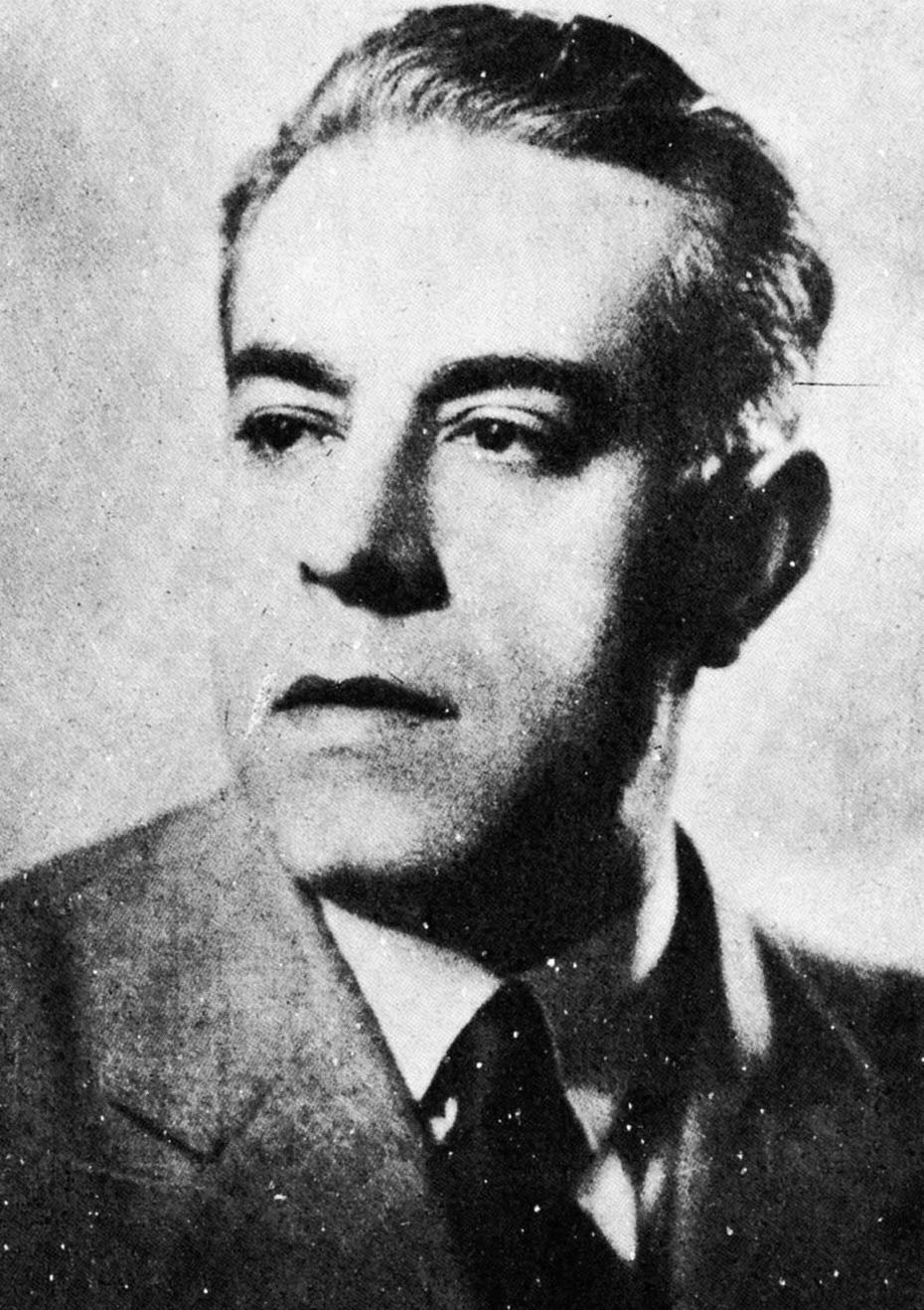
- Born: February 26, 1894; Córdoba, Argentina
- Died: December 23, 1970 (aged 76); Buenos Aires
- Education: National University of Córdoba
- Occupation: Academic

Carlos Astrada (February 26, 1894 – December 23, 1970) was an Argentine philosopher.

Astrada was born in Córdoba. He completed his secondary school studies at the Colegio Nacional de Monserrat in Córdoba, and his university studies in law at the National University of Córdoba. His 1926 essay "The Epistemological Problem in Philosophy", earned an Astrada scholarship to Germany. He studied at the Universities of Cologne, Bonn, and Freiburg, under Max Scheler, Edmund Husserl, Martin Heidegger and Oskar Becker during his four years there.

When he returned to Argentina from Germany, Astrada was designated the head of Publications and Conferences in the Social Institute of the University of Litoral (1933–1934). There he began a vast career in distinct academic functions of the country: he was an adjunct professor of The History of Modern and Contemporary Philosophy in the School of Philosophy and Letter in the University of Buenos Aires (1936–1947); Professor of Ethics in the School of Science and Humanities in Education at the University of La Plata in La Plata (1937–1947); Professor of Philosophy in the Colegio Nacional de Buenos Aires (1939–1949); Professor of Nomology and Metaphysics in the School of Philosophy and Letters in the University of Buenos Aires (1947–1956); Director of the Institute of Philosophy in the University of Buenos Aires (1948–1956), and other posts. Astrada died in Buenos Aires in 1970.
