= Edward Jones-Imhotep =

American historian

Edward Jones-Imhotep is an American historian of science and technology, and professor and director at the Institute for the History and Philosophy of Science and Technology, University of Toronto. He received his Ph.D. in history of science from Harvard University in 2001.

He received the 1995 Mellon Fellowship from the Andrew W. Mellon Foundation in Humanistic Studies. Jones-Imhotep's research focuses on the historical and philosophical aspects of modern physical sciences and technology.

His book The Unreliable Nation: Hostile Nature and Technological Failure in the Cold War (MIT Press, 2017) won the Society for the History of Technology's 2018 Sidney M. Edelstein Prize for an outstanding book, citing the book's "place of technology in modern history which puts the book into dialogue with the vast literatures on envirotech, on technology and state-building, on Cold War science and technology, and on modernity."

== See also ==
- American philosophy
- List of American philosophers
