= Fritz Heinemann (philosopher) =

German philosopher

Fritz Heinemann (8 February 1889 – 7 January 1970) was a German philosopher.

Born in Lüneburg, he taught at Frankfurt University from 1930 to 1933. From 1939 to 1956, he taught at Manchester College, Oxford.

In Neue Wege der Philosophie (1929) Heinemann heralded the rise of the Existential movement by coining the term Existenzphilosphie, translated as Existentialism.

== Works ==
- Plotin. Forschungen über die plotinische Frage, 1921
- Neue Wege der Philosophie, 1929
- Odysseus oder die Zukunft der Philosophie, 1939
- Existentialism and the Modern Predicament, 1953
- Existenzphilosophie: lebendig oder tot?, 1963
