= Ronna Burger =

American philosopher

Ronna C. Burger
- Born: December 5, 1947 (age 78)
- Awards: Tulane University Dissertation Director Award, Professional Scholarly Publishing Prose Award, Fellowships from Andrew W. Mellon Foundation, the National Endowment for the Humanities, Earhart Foundation, Alexander von Humboldt Foundation and Carl Friedrich von Siemens Foundation

Education
- Education: New School for Social Research (Ph.D.)
- Doctoral advisor: Seth Benardete

Philosophical work
- Era: Contemporary philosophy
- Region: Western philosophy
- Institutions: Tulane University
- Main interests: Plato, Aristotle, Maimonides, Hebrew Bible, Leo Strauss

Ronna C. Burger (born December 5, 1947) is an American philosopher and Professor of Philosophy, Catherine & Henry J. Gaisman Chair, and Sizeler Professor of Jewish Studies at Tulane University.

== Career ==
She received her PhD in philosophy from the New School for Social Research Graduate Faculty and has been teaching at Tulane since 1980. Her research has been supported by the Andrew W. Mellon Foundation, the National Endowment for the Humanities, Earhart Foundation, Alexander von Humboldt Foundation and Carl Friedrich von Siemens Foundation. She is the author of books and articles on Plato and Aristotle, and her graduate seminars on those thinkers have often led to dissertations in ancient philosophy. In recent years she has extended her studies to Maimonides and the Hebrew Bible, writing essays, teaching courses, and lecturing on numerous college campuses.

== Books ==
- On Plato's Euthyphro (Carl Friedrich von Siemens Foundation, 2015)
- Aristotle's Dialogue with Socrates: on the Nicomachean Ethics (Chicago, 2008)
- The Phaedo: A Platonic Labyrinth (Yale, 1984. Reprinted, St. Augustine's Press 1999)
- Plato's Phaedrus: A Defense of a Philosophic Art of Writing (Alabama, 1980)
- The Eccentric Core: the Thought of Seth Benardete co-edited with Patrick Goodin (St. Augustine's Press, 2017)
- The Archaeology of the Soul: Platonic Readings in Ancient Poetry and Philosophy by Seth Benardete, co-edited with Michael Davis (St. Augustine's Press, 2012)
- Encounters and Reflections: Conversations with Seth Benardete (ed.) (Chicago, 2002)
- The Argument of the Action: Essays on Greek Poetry and Philosophy by Seth Benardete, co-edited with Michael Davis (University of Chicago Press, 2000)
