= 1972 in philosophy =

1972 in philosophy

== Events ==
- Society for Women in Philosophy founded

== Publications ==
- Davidson, D. and Harman, G. (ed.) Semantics of Natural Language, Dordrecht; Boston: Reidel
- Deleuze, Gilles and Guattari, Félix, L'anti-Oedipe, (Paris: Les Editions de Minuit, 1972).
- Kripke, Saul, "Naming and Necessity." (Published separately in 1980; setting out the causal theory of reference.)
- Lakoff, George, "Linguistics and Natural Logic."
- Stalnaker, Robert, "Pragmatics."
- Dreyfus, Hubert, What Computers Can't Do: The Limits of Artificial Intelligence (Rev. ed., 1979)
- Kahneman, Daniel and Tversky, Amos, "Subjective probability", Cognitive Psychology 3:430–454
- Popper, Karl, Objective Knowledge: An Evolutionary Approach (Rev. ed., 1979)

== Births ==
- January 29 - Forrest Clingerman
- May 13 - Mohammed Chaouki Zine
- October 1 - Mantas Adomėnas
- December 24 - Ingo Zechner
- Austin Dacey
- Edward Jones-Imhotep
- Erik Del Bufalo, Venezuelan philosopher

== Deaths ==
- January 5 - Paul Diel (born 1893)
- February 14 - Gerhard Krüger (philosopher) (born 1902)
- February 17 - Ion Petrovici (born 1882)
- February 29 - Pietro Ubaldi (born 1886)
- May 1 - Stephen Pepper (born 1891)
- August 20 - Nichifor Crainic (born 1889)
- October 23 - John Daniel Wild (born 1902)
- November 17 - Eugène Minkowski (born 1885)
- December 23 - Abraham Joshua Heschel (born 1907)
- Gregorio Bermann
- Zhu Qianzhi
