= 1969 in philosophy =

1969 in philosophy was a critical year for the publication of a number of important works.

== Publications ==
- Lewis White Beck, Early German Philosophy: Kant and His Predecessors
- Gilles Deleuze, The Logic of Sense (1969)
- John Passmore, Philosophical Reasoning
- G.J. Warnock, Berkeley
- Richard Wollheim, F. H. Bradley

== Births ==
- April 22 - Justin Clemens
- August 7 - Idris Azad
- August 7 - Gonzalo Rodríguez Pereyra
- October 5 - Ásta Kristjana Sveinsdóttir
- October 12 - Jason Stanley
- October 30 - Ronald van Raak
- December 1 - Richard Carrier
- December 20 - Alain de Botton
- John Corvino
- David Ross Fryer
- David Koepsell
- Björn Kraus
- Erin Manning (theorist)
- Lisa H. Schwartzman
- Thich Nhat Tu
- Jeremy Weate

== Deaths ==
- January 6 - Shalva Nutsubidze, Georgian philosopher, translator and public benefactor (born 1888)
- January 18 - Hans Freyer (born 1887)
- February 26 - Karl Jaspers (born 1883)
- March 23 - Rudolf Pannwitz (born 1881)
- March 27 - Jacob Loewenberg (born 1882)
- March 30 - Viktor Sonnenfeld (born 1902)
- May 14 - Walter Pitts (born 1923)
- June 10 - José Gaos (born 1900)
- July 9 - Shankar Vaman Dandekar (born 1896)
- July 11 - Friedrich Siegmund-Schultze (born 1885)
- July 15 - Leonard Hodgson (born 1889)
- August 2 - Herbert James Paton (born 1887)
- August 6 - Theodor W. Adorno (born 1903)
- September 3 - Curt John Ducasse, French philosopher (born 1881)
- October 6 - Arthur Prior (born 1914)
- November 28 - Honorio Delgado (born 1892).
