= Mohammed Chaouki Zine =

Algerian philosopher and writer

Mohammed Chaouki Zine is an Algerian philosopher and writer. He was born on May 13, 1972, in Oran, Algeria. He has been interested for several years to Contemporary Western philosophy as testifies his Hermeneutics and Deconstructions (Beirut-Casablanca, 2002), where he speaks about many philosophers like Michel Foucault, Jacques Derrida, Michel de Certeau, Hans-Georg Gadamer, Richard Rorty and Jean Baudrillard. He has a Ph.D. on Arabic and Iberian Studies about the mystic and Andalusian philosopher from Spain Ibn Arabi (Murcia, 1165–1240, Damascus). He was named in the book of Hubert Mono Ndjana about the History of African Philosophy, in French Histoire de la philosophie africaine .

== Publications ==
- (Ar) Hermeneutics and Deconstructions, Cultural Arabic Center, Beirut-Casablanca, 2002.
- (Fr) Identities and Othernesses, Editions of Difference, Algiers, 2002. ISBN 9961-832-58-2
- (Ar) Politics on Reason, Editions of the West, Oran, 2005.
- (Ar) Intellectual Shifting (Modernity and the Intellectual), Editions of Difference, Algiers, 2005
- (Ar) Philosophy of Hermeneutics (Arabic translation of the book of Hans-Georg Gadamer), Editions of Difference, Algiers; Arab Scientific Publishers and Cultural Arabic Center, Beirut, 2006.
- (Ar) Displacement and Possibility : Critical plates on Western Philosophy, Arab Scientific Publishers, Algiers-Beirut, 2008.

== Official website ==
(in French) Philosophie & Histoire des idées
