= Rachel Cooper (philosopher) =

British philosopher (born 1974)

Rachel Valerie Cooper
- Born: 1974 (age 51–52)

Education
- Education: University of Cambridge

Philosophical work
- Institutions: Lancaster University
- Main interests: Philosophy of science, philosophy of medicine, philosophy of psychiatry
- Notable works: Classifying Madness (2005), Psychiatry and the Philosophy of Science (2007), Diagnosing the Diagnostic and Statistical Manual of Mental Disorders (2014)

Rachel Cooper (born 1974) is a British philosopher specialising in the philosophy of medicine and philosophy of science, especially the philosophy of psychiatry. She is currently a professor in the Department of Politics, Philosophy and Religion at Lancaster University. She is the author of Classifying Madness (2005, Springer), Psychiatry and the Philosophy of Science (2007, Acumen) and Diagnosing the Diagnostic and Statistical Manual of Mental Disorders (2014, Karnac).

== Career ==
Cooper worked as a temporary lecturer in philosophy at the University of Bristol from 1999 to 2000 and a lecturer in philosophy at the University of Bradford from 2000 to 2003. She submitted her PhD thesis, entitled Classifying Madness: A Philosophical Examination of the Diagnostic and Statistical Manual of Mental Disorders, to the University of Cambridge in January 2002. A book based on the PhD thesis, and of the same name, was published by Springer in 2005 as volume 86 of their Philosophy and Medicine series. By the time of the book's publication, Cooper had moved to Lancaster University. In Classifying Madness, Cooper offers an analysis of the fourth edition of the Diagnostic and Statistical Manual of Mental Disorders (DSM), arguing that while the DSM's goal of classifying mental disorders as natural kinds is a good one it is unlikely to be successful in real-world practice.

In 2007, Cooper published Psychiatry and the Philosophy of Science with Acumen. In the book, she explores the continuities and discontinuities between psychiatry and other scientific disciplines which are more established. In 2014, her Diagnosing the Diagnostic and Statistical Manual of Mental Disorders was published with Karnac. This book explored the fifth edition of the DSM, discussing philosophical issues it raises. The same year, she co-edited, with Havi Carel, the Routledge collection Health, Illness and Disease: Philosophical Essays. As of 2018, Cooper is a professor in Lancaster's Department of Politics, Philosophy and Religion and is working on a book about the concept of disease.

== Selected bibliography ==
- Cooper, Rachel (2005). Classifying Madness: A Philosophical Examination of the Diagnostic and Statistical Manual of Mental Disorders. Dordrecht: Springer.
- Cooper, Rachel (2007). Psychiatry and the Philosophy of Science. Durham: Acumen.
- Cooper, Rachel (2014). Diagnosing the Diagnostic and Statistical Manual of Mental Disorders. London: Karnac.
