= 1971 in philosophy =

1971 in philosophy

== Events ==
- Chomsky–Foucault debate
- Lewis White Beck presents his paper Extraterrestrial Intelligent Life as President of the Eastern Division of the American Philosophical Association during its sixty-eighth meeting in New York City in an effort to engage in rational cosmological speculation.

== Publications ==
- G. E. M. Anscombe, Causality and Determination, Cambridge University Press
- A. J. Ayer, Russell and Moore: The Analytical Heritage, London: Macmillan
- Keith Campbell, Body and Mind, New York: Doubleday
- R. G. Collingwood, Ruskin's Philosophy, Chicester: Quentin Nelson
- Dorothy Emmet and Alasdair MacIntyre (ed.) Sociological Theory and Philosophical Analysis, New York: Macmillan
- Antony Flew, An Introduction to Western Philosophy, London: Thames & Hudson
- John Hick, Arguments for the Existence of God, London: Macmillan
- Alasdair MacIntyre, Against the Self-Images of the Age: Essays on Ideology and Philosophy.
- John Rawls, A Theory of Justice (first edition), Harvard University Press
- John Searle (ed.), The Philosophy of Language, Oxford University Press
- P. F. Strawson, Logico-Linguistic Papers, London: Methuen
- Geoffrey Warnock, The Object of Morality, London: Methuen
- Ivan Illich, Deschooling Society

== Deaths ==
- May 5: W. D. Ross, Scottish philosopher (born 1877)
