= 1966 in philosophy =

1966 in philosophy was a critical year for the publication of a number of important works.

== Events ==
- Heidegger's interview with Der Spiegel under the title Only a God Can Save Us (published in 1976)

== Publications ==
- Lewis White Beck, Six Secular Philosophers (1966)
- Michael Polanyi, The Tacit Dimension (1966)
- Kenneth Burke, Language As Symbolic Action (1966)
- Theodor W. Adorno, Negative Dialectics (1966)
- Michel Foucault, The Order of Things (1966)
- Louis Dumont, Homo Hierarchicus (1966)
- Mary Douglas, Purity and Danger (1966)
- Peter L. Berger and Thomas Luckmann, The Social Construction of Reality (1966)
- Susan Sontag, Against Interpretation (1966)
- Alasdair MacIntyre, A Short History of Ethics (1966)
- Richard Clyde Taylor, Action and Purpose (1966)

== Births ==
- February 23 - Paul Bakker, controversial Dutch professor of medieval and renaissance philosophy
- April 20 - David Chalmers

== Deaths ==
- July 12 - D. T. Suzuki (born 1870)
