= 1974 in philosophy =

1974 in philosophy was a critical year for the publication of a number of important works, both scholarly and academic studies, and popular literature.

== Events ==
- Last and final meeting of the London Positivist Society

== Publications ==
=== Essays ===
- Fodor, Jerry, T. Bever and M. Garrett, The Psychology of Language, McGraw Hill.
- Karttunen, Lauri, "Presupposition and Linguistic Context," Theoretical Linguistics, 1, pp. 181–194. (Presented at the 1973 Winter Meeting of the Linguistic Society of America in San Diego)
- Montague, Richard, Formal Philosophy: Selected Papers of Richard Montague. ed. and introd. by Richmond H. Thomason. New Haven: Yale Univ. Press.
- Thomas Nagel, "What Is it Like to Be a Bat?", The Philosophical Review
- Nozick, Robert, Anarchy, State, and Utopia
- Schleiermacher, Friedrich, Hermeneutik. Nach den Handschriften. Ed. Heinz Kimmerle. Heidelberg: Carl Winter.
- Turner, Victor. Dramas, Fields, and Metaphors: Symbolic Action in Human Society
- Henri Lefebvre, The Production of Space (1974)

=== Philosophical fiction ===
- Robert M. Pirsig, Zen and the Art of Motorcycle Maintenance (1974)

== Births ==
- Lisa Bortolotti
- Rachel Cooper

== Deaths ==
- Imre Lakatos of the London School of Economics suddenly died of a brain haemorrhage on February 2, aged 51. The Lakatos Award was set up by the school in his memory.
