= 1977 in philosophy =

1977 in philosophy

== Publications ==
- Burge, Tyler. "Belief de re." Journal of Philosophy 74, 338–62.
- Dennett, Daniel. "A Cure for the Common Code." Reprinted in D. Dennett (1978) Brainstorms: Philosophical Essays on Mind and Psychology. MIT Press.
- Dworkin, Ronald. Taking Rights Seriously. Harvard University Press
- Evans, Gareth. "Pronouns, Quantifiers and Relative Clauses (I)." Canadian Journal of Philosophy VIII, 3, 467–536.
- Hornsby, Jennifer. "Singular Terms in Contexts of Propositional Attitude," Mind 86: 31–48.
- Johnson-Laird, Philip N. and Wason, P. C. Thinking: Readings in Cognitive Science. Cambridge University Press.
- Kosslyn, Stephen and Pomerantz, J. R. "Imagery, Propositions, and the Form of Internal Representations," Cognitive Psychology 9: 52–76.
- Kripke, Saul. "Speaker's Reference and Semantic Reference." Midwest Studies in Philosophy 2: 255–76. (In: French, Uehling and Wettstein (eds.), Contemporary Perspectives in the Philosophy of Language. University of Minnesota Press, 6–27.)
- Lakoff, Robin. "What you can do with words: Politeness, pragmatics and performatives." In: Proceedings of the Texas Conference on Performatives, Presuppositions and Implicatures, ed. R. Rogers, R. Wall & J. Murphy, pp. 79–106. Center for Applied Linguistics
- McDowell, John. "On the Sense and Reference of Proper Names." Mind 86, 159–185.
- McGinn, Colin. "Charity, Interpretation, and Belief." Journal of Philosophy 74: 521–535.
- McGinn, Colin. "Semantics for Nonindicative Sentences." Philosophical Studies 32: 301–311.

== Deaths ==
- February 12 – Herman Dooyeweerd (born 1894)
- August 4 – Ernst Bloch (born 1885)
- September 4 – E. F. Schumacher (born 1911)
