= 1957 in philosophy =

1957 in philosophy was a critical year for the publication of a number of important works.

== Events ==
- Albert Camus was awarded the Nobel Prize in Literature.

== Publications ==
- Karl Jaspers, The Great Philosophers (originally published in German as Die großen Philosophen, 1957)
- Paul Tillich, Dynamics of Faith (1957)
- Bernard Lonergan, Insight: A Study of Human Understanding (1957)
- B. F. Skinner, Verbal Behavior (1957)
- Leopold Kohr, The Breakdown of Nations (1957)
- André Leroi-Gourhan, Prehistoric Man (1957)
- Northrop Frye, Anatomy of Criticism (1957)
- Noam Chomsky, Syntactic Structures (1957)

=== Philosophical fiction ===
- Ayn Rand, Atlas Shrugged (1957)
- Max Frisch, Homo Faber (1957)

== Deaths ==
- March 20 - Charles Kay Ogden, English linguistic psychologist and polymath (born 1889)
- October 13 - Erich Auerbach, German-born scholar of comparative literature and philologist (born 1892)
