= 1956 in philosophy =

1956 in philosophy was a year for the publication of a few important works, as well as other events.

== Publications ==
- Benjamin Lee Whorf, Language, Thought and Reality (published posthumously in 1956)
- Erich Fromm, The Art of Loving (1956)
- A. J. Ayer, The Problem of Knowledge (1956)

== Births ==
- February 24 - Judith Butler
- Shelly Kagan

== Deaths ==
- January 29 - H. L. Mencken (born 1880)
- July 29 - Ludwig Klages (born 1872)
- October 30 - Pío Baroja (born 1872)
