= 1976 in philosophy =

1976 in philosophy was problematic. Martin Heidegger's final interview, which was an apologia for his complicity with the Third Reich, was published ten years after it took place. No major treatises were published in 1976, although some lesser-known albeit notable works were published that year. As of 2026, no notable philosophers were born in 1976.

== Publications ==
- Heidegger's interview with Der Spiegel under the title Only a God Can Save Us
- Belnap, Nuel and Steel, T. The Logic of Questions and Answers. New Haven: Yale University Press.
- Bennett, Jonathan. Linguistic Behaviour. Cambridge: Cambridge University Press.
- Frye, Marilyn. "On saying." American Philosophical Quarterly 13: 123–127.
- Goodman, Nelson. Languages of Art (2nd ed.), Indianapolis: Hackett.
- Harnish, Robert M. "Logical form and implicature." In: An Integrated Theory of Linguistic Ability, ed. T. G. Bever, J. J. Katz & T. Langedoen, pp. 313–92. New York: Thomas Y. Crowell.
- Hornsby, Jennifer. "Proper Names: A Defense of Burge." Philosophical Studies 30: 227–234.
- Loar, Brian. "The Semantics of Singular Terms." Philosophical Studies 30: 353–377.
- Newell, Allen and Simon, H. A. "Computer Science as Empirical Inquiry: Symbols and Search." Communications of the Association for Computing Machinery 19: 113–126.
- Rosset, Clement. Le Réel et son double : essai sur l'illusion, Paris, Gallimard, 1976 ISBN 2070327515. Published in English as The Real and its Double (The University of Chicago Press, 2012, ISBN 978-0-8574203-4-3)
- Soames, Scott. A Critical Examination of Frege's Theory of Presupposition and Contemporary Alternatives. PhD thesis, MIT Dept. of Linguistics and Philosophy.
- Unger, Roberto M. Law in Modern Society: Toward a Criticism of Social Theory. Free Press.
- Foucault, Michel. The history of sexuality. Editions Gallimard

== Deaths ==
- February 22 - Michael Polanyi (born 1891)
- May 26 - Martin Heidegger (born 1889)
- October 6 - Gilbert Ryle (born 1900)

== See also ==
- 1976 in literature
- 1976 in the environment
- 1976 in music
