= 1973 in philosophy =

1973 in philosophy was a critical year for the publication of a number of important works.

== Events ==
- The Twin Earth thought experiment is presented by Hilary Putnam in his paper "Meaning and Reference".

== Publications ==
- Bruner, Jerome, Beyond the Information Given: Studies in the Psychology of Knowing. W. W. Norton, Oxford, UK
- Dummett, Michael, Frege: Philosophy of Language (rev. 1981)
- Geertz, Clifford, "Thick Description: Toward an Interpretive Theory of Culture." In: The Interpretation of Cultures: Selected Essays. (New York: Basic Books) 3-30.
- Herzberger, H. G., "Dimension of Truth," Journal of Philosophical Logic, 2, 535–556.
- Holmes, Robert L., "On Pacifism". The Monist, Vol. 57, No. 4, 489-506
- Karttunen, Lauri, "Presuppositions of Compound Sentences," Linguistic Inquiry, IV:2, 169–193.
- Karttunen, Lauri, "Presupposition and Linguistic Context," Theoretical Linguistics, 1, pp. 181–194 (1974). Presented at the 1973 Winter Meeting of the Linguistic Society of America in San Diego
- Keenan, E., "Presupposition in Natural Logic," The Monist, 57:3, 344–370.
- Lakoff, George, "Pragmatics and Natural Logic," in: Murphy, J., A. Rogers, and R. Wall (eds.)
- Lewis, D. K., Counterfactuals, Cambridge, Massachusetts: Harvard University Press.
- Liberman, M. "Alternatives," in: Papers from the Ninth Regional Meeting of the Chicago Linguistic Society, University of Chicago, Chicago, Illinois.
- Morgan, J. L., Presupposition and the Representation of Meaning, unpublished Doctoral Dissertation, University of Chicago, Chicago, Illinois.
- Murphy, J., A. Rogers, and R. Wall (eds.) Proceedings of the Texas Conference on Performatives, Presuppositions, and Conversational Implicatures, Center for Applied Linguistics, Washington, D. C.
- Stalnaker, R. C., "Presuppositions," Journal of Philosophical Logic, 2, 447-457
- Taylor, Richard Clyde, Freedom, Anarchy and the Law: An Introduction to Political Philosophy (1973)
- Taylor, Richard Clyde, With Heart and Mind (1973)
- Thomason, R. H., "Semantics, Pragmatics, Conversation, and Presupposition," in: Murphy, J., A. Rogers, and R. Wall (eds.)

== Births ==
- May 9 - Luuk van Middelaar, Dutch historian and political philosopher

== Deaths ==
- April 28 - Jacques Maritain, French Catholic philosopher, 90
- May 26 - Karl Löwith, German philosopher, student of Heidegger, 76
- July 7 - Max Horkheimer, German philosopher, Institute for Social Research, 78
- September 5 - Roy Wood Sellars, US philosopher of critical realism and religious humanism, 93
- October 10 - Ludwig von Mises, philosopher, Austrian School economist, and classical liberal, 92
- October 18 - Leo Strauss, German-born American political philosopher, 74
- October 31 – Malek Bennabi, Algerian philosopher, 68
- November 16 - Alan Watts, British philosopher, writer and speaker, 58

== See also ==
- Yom Kippur War
- 1973 oil crisis
