= 1959 in philosophy =

1959 in philosophy

== Events ==
- Colin Murray Turbayne demonstrates in his publication "Berkeley's Two Concepts of Mind" that George Berkeley intended to transcend ontological idealism in order to embrace a more skeptical view of the presence of a universal substantial mind.

== Publications ==
- Ernest Gellner, Words and Things (1959)
- C. P. Snow, The Two Cultures (1959)
- Norman O. Brown, Life Against Death (1959)
- P. F. Strawson, Individuals: An Essay in Descriptive Metaphysics (1959)
- Erving Goffman, The Presentation of Self in Everyday Life (1959)

== Births ==
- January 1 - Michel Onfray
- May 20 - Konrad Ott
