= 1963 in philosophy =

1963 in philosophy was the year of the publication of a number of important works.

== Events ==
- Martin Buber was awarded the Erasmus Prize in 1963.

== Publications ==
- Hannah Arendt, Eichmann in Jerusalem (1963) and On Revolution (1963)
- Donald Davidson, Actions, Reasons, and Causes (1963)
- William Hardy McNeill, The Rise of the West: A History of the Human Community (1963)
- Betty Friedan, The Feminine Mystique (1963)
- Edmund Gettier, Is Justified True Belief Knowledge? (1963)
- Richard Clyde Taylor, Metaphysics (1963)

== Deaths ==
- June 17 - John Cowper Powys (born 1872)
- August 27 - W. E. B. Du Bois (born 1868)
- November 22 - Aldous Huxley (born 1894)
- November 22 - C. S. Lewis (born 1898)
