= 1965 in philosophy =

1965 in philosophy

== Events ==
- Richard Clyde Taylor coauthored the essay "Time, Truth, and Ability" with Steven Cahn, using the nom de plume of the obscure ancient Greek philosopher Diodorus Cronus.

== Publications ==
- Lewis White Beck, Studies in the Philosophy of Kant (1965)
- Paul Ricœur, Freud and Philosophy: An Essay on Interpretation (1965)
- Gordon E. Moore, Cramming more components onto integrated circuits (1965)

=== Philosophical fiction ===
- Pierre Klossowski, The Baphomet (1965)
- Frank Herbert, Dune (1965)

== Deaths ==
- February 21 - Malcolm X (born 1925)
- June 13 - Martin Buber (born 1878)
- August 11 - Erich Rothacker (born 1888)
- September 4 - Albert Schweitzer (born 1875)
- October 22 - Paul Tillich (born 1886)
