= 1961 in philosophy =

1961 in philosophy

== Events ==
- Hegel Yearbook was established in 1961.

== Publications ==
- Arnold J. Toynbee, A Study of History (1961)
- Emmanuel Lévinas, Totality and Infinity (1961)
- H. L. A. Hart, The Concept of Law (1961)
- Frantz Fanon, The Wretched of the Earth (1961)
- E. H. Carr, What Is History? (1961)

=== Philosophical fiction ===
- Stanisław Lem, Solaris (1961)

== Births ==
- Ruth Abbey

== Deaths ==
- January 4 - Erwin Schrödinger (born 1887)
- May 3 - Maurice Merleau-Ponty (born 1908)
- May 6 - Lucian Blaga (born 1895)
- June 6 - Carl Jung (born 1875)
- December 6 - Frantz Fanon (born 1925)
