= 1967 in philosophy =

1967 in philosophy was a critical year for the publication of a number of important works.

== Publications ==
- Max Horkheimer, Critique of Instrumental Reason (1967)
- Marshall McLuhan, The Medium Is the Massage (1967)
- Roland Barthes, Death of the Author (1967)
- Donald Davidson, Truth and Meaning (1967)
- Martin Luther King Jr., Where Do We Go from Here: Chaos or Community? (1967)
- Jacques Derrida, Of Grammatology (1967), Writing and Difference (1967), and Speech and Phenomena (1967)
- Guy Debord, The Society of the Spectacle (1967)
- Jürgen Habermas, On the Logic of the Social Sciences (1967)
- Desmond Morris, The Naked Ape
- Raoul Vaneigem. Traité de savoir-vivre à l'usage des jeunes générations (AKA The Revolution of Everyday life) 1967

=== Philosophical literature ===
- Brian Aldiss, Report on Probability A (1967)

== Deaths ==
- June 5 – Arthur Biram, German-born Israeli philosopher and educator, Israel Prize recipient (born 1878 in philosophy)
