= Lewis White Beck =

American philosopher (1913–1997)

- Born: September 26, 1913; Griffin, Georgia, U.S.
- Died: June 7, 1997 (aged 83); Rochester, New York, U.S.
- Awards: American Academy of Arts and Sciences Fellowship; American Council of Learned Societies Fellowship; Guggenheim Fellow; Rosenwald Fund Fellowship

Education
- Education: Emory University; Duke University
- Thesis: Synopsis: A Study in the Theory of Knowledge (1937)
- Academic advisor: Leroy Loemker

Philosophical work
- Era: Western philosophy
- Region: Contemporary philosophy
- School: Kantianism
- Institutions: University of Rochester; Emory University; University of Delaware; Lehigh University
- Main interests: Immanuel Kant; Moral philosophy Kantian ethics Humanism; Epistemology
- Notable ideas: Unity of Kantian practical reason and the metaphysical equivalence of causal and rational explanation.

Lewis White Beck (September 26, 1913 – June 7, 1997) was an American philosopher and scholar of German philosophy specializing in German idealism at the University of Rochester. As Chairman of the Department of Philosophy, he achieved international recognition for encouraging collaborative research by scholars within the United States and Germany into the philosophy of Immanuel Kant during the post-World War II era. Beck also translated several of Kant's works from German, including the Critique of Practical Reason, and authored Studies in the Philosophy of Kant (1965).

== Biography ==
=== Early life ===
Born in Griffin, Georgia, Beck was the youngest of four children in a family raised by Erasmus W. Beck and Inez H. Beck. His siblings included: Gladys H. Beck, Edwin H. Beck and Sarah A Beck. His father was employed as both an engineer and a sales representative.

In his youth, Beck exhibited a natural talent for philosophical discourse and repeatedly raised questions related to the famous Scopes trial. Much to his delight, he was formally introduced to the subject of philosophy by his sister who provided him with a copy of Will Durant's The Story of Philosophy at the age of fourteen. This subsequently inspired him to investigate the scientific writings of Thomas Henry Huxley and to acquire employment as a "lab assistant" while enrolled in high school.

Beck's passion for dabbling in the synthesis of organic compounds after hours attracted the attention of his mentors and he was excused from studying introductory chemistry courses upon being enrolled at Emory University. Beck's performance in the quantitative chemistry lab was hindered, however, by an undiagnosed case of color blindness which he successfully concealed. Nevertheless, his perseverance was rewarded and by the conclusion of his junior year he was honored with an unusual admission to an honorary fraternity for chemists.

Beck already suspected that his affliction might prove to be a dangerous hindrance to his aspiration of becoming a professional chemist. However, as Beck soon attended a philosophical lecture by Leroy Loemker on "The Limits of Scientific Concepts" which was based upon the writings of Heinrich Rickert and Ernst Cassirer. Beck was captivated by the prospect of conducting "gedankenexperiments" without toiling in a dangerous laboratory. He immediately convinced Loemker to take on the monumental task of tutoring him in philosophy during his junior year so that he could change his major before graduating. One year later, Beck entered graduate school and remained forever grateful to Loemker for his guidance and personal interest in Beck's aspiration to join the ranks of "philosophic workmen".

Beck received his bachelor's degree Phi Beta Kappa from Emory University in 1934, his master's degree from Duke University in 1935, and his doctoral degree from Duke University in 1937. His dissertation was entitled: "Synopsis: A Study in the Theory of Knowledge.

=== Academic career ===
Before moving to Rochester, Beck was an international student and a Rosenwald Fund Fellow at the University of Berlin (1937–38; an interview about his experiences there appeared in The Atlanta Constitution, September 18, 1938), an instructor at Emory University (1938–41), Associate Professor of Philosophy at the University of Delaware (1941–48), and associate professor at Lehigh University (1946–48), eventually becoming professor (1948–49).

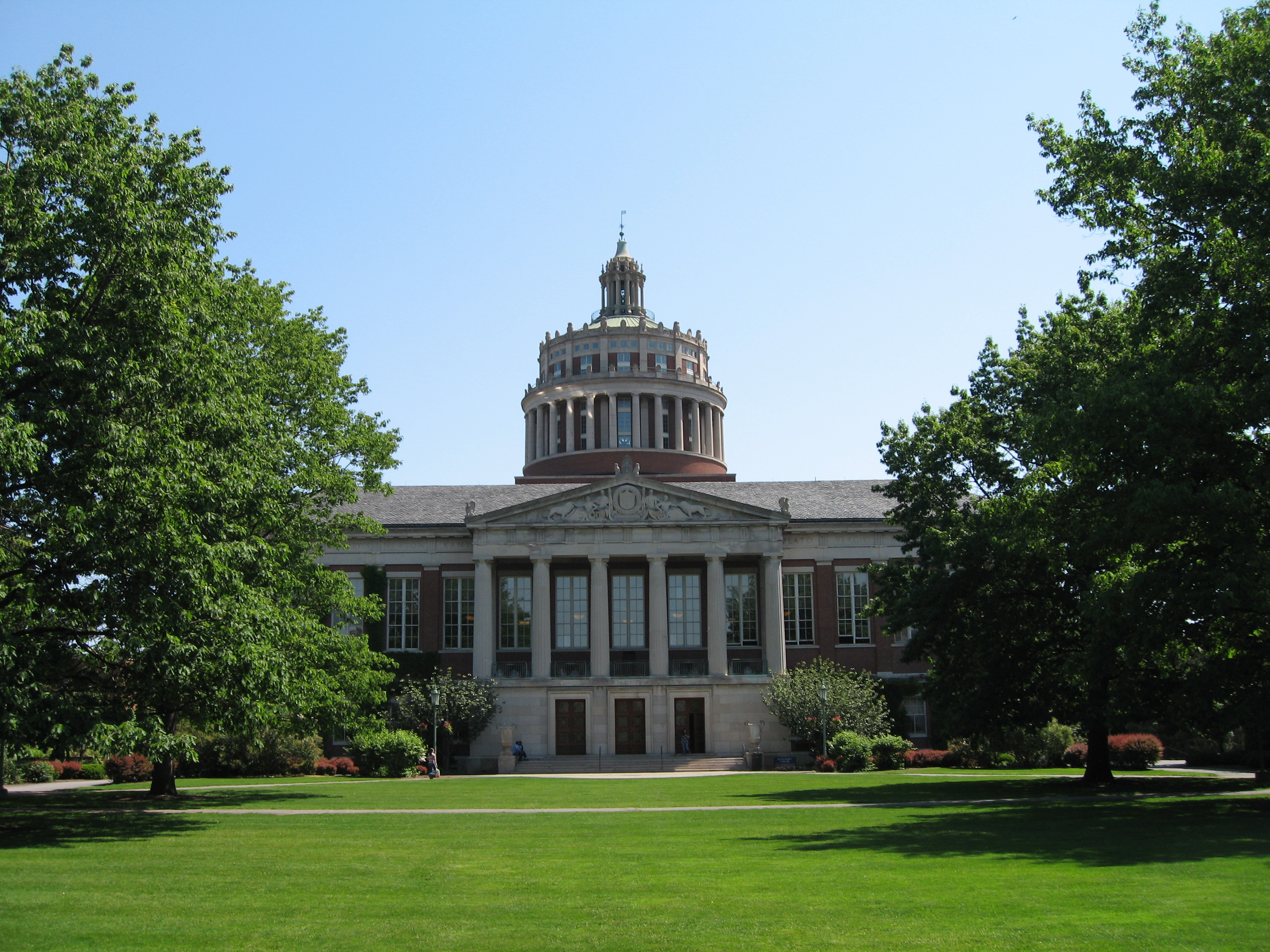
The Rush Rhees Library at University of Rochester

Beck joined the faculty at the University of Rochester in 1949 and served as Chairman of its Department of Philosophy from 1949 to 1966. He also served as Associate Dean of the Graduate School (1952-1956) as well as the Dean of the Graduate School (1956–1957) where he helped to raise international recognition for the PhD. program in Philosophy. During this time he was awarded a Guggenheim Fellowship in the field of Philosophy (1957). He is credited with assisting his colleague Colin Murray Turbayne in his work The Myth of Metaphor (1962). Subsequently, he collaborated with his colleague Robert L. Holmes in the publication of a comprehensive introduction to the study of philosophy, Philosophical Inquiry: An Introduction to Philosophy (1968)). In 1970 he also collaborated with the Kantian scholar Gottfried Martin at the University of Bonn to organize the first International Kant Congress to be hosted in the United States and helped to establish an enduring close collaboration between Kantian scholars in both Germany and America. Cornell University's Society for the Humanities invited Beck to present his lecture "What Have We Learned from Kant?" at a colloquium in 1981, commemorating the two hundredth anniversary of the publication of Kant's Critique of Pure Reason.

In 1962 he was appointed as the Burbank Professor of Moral and Intellectual Philosophy and subsequently Professor Emeritus in 1979. In 1962 he became the first recipient of the University's Edward Peck Curtis Award for Excellence in Undergraduate Teaching. He was subsequently elected a Fellow of the American Academy of Arts and Sciences in 1963 and the American Council of Learned Societies in 1964. From 1970 to 1975, Beck also served on the National Endowment for the Humanities Council. During this time he also served as a member of the board of directors for the American Academy of Arts and Sciences (1970–1978). In addition, he was a President of the Eastern Division of the American Philosophical Association.

During the course of his long academic career, Beck also held appointments as a visiting lecturer at several leading academic research centers including: Columbia University (1950), George Washington University, the University of Minnesota (1953), the University of California at Berkeley (1973), Yale University (1974) and the Rochester Institute of Technology (1982–1983). In addition, he received honorary degrees from Hamilton College, Emory University and the University of Tubingen.

In addition to his teaching activities, Beck also served on the editorial board of several leading philosophical research journals including: the Journal of the History of Ideas and Kantian-Studien. Over the years he also served on the editorial board of the journal The Monist which also featured his work. His original research into the philosophy of Immanuel Kant was also published within the authoritative journal Kant-Studien in both the German and English languages. In addition, in 1970 he served as editor of the Proceedings of the Third International Kant Congress. In 1985 he also contributed to the formation of the North American Kantian Society.

Over the years, Beck was praised by his students for his charm and wit. Even after his formal retirement in 1979 he continued to meet with informal gatherings of aspiring young scholars in an effort to share his unique insights into Kant's works until 1996. Always humble, Beck was often observed to joke that his prize for an award in teaching excellence was rejected as "nontaxable" by the Internal Revenue Service because it was more appropriately categorized as "unearned" income.

Included among Beck's notable students are Professor Emeritus Predrag Cicovaki at the College of the Holy Cross, who completed his dissertation Kant on the Possibility of Empirical Cognition under Beck's guidance at the University of Rochester in 1991.

=== Academic work ===
==== Immanuel Kant ====
Beck is most noted for his research into the collective writings of the German philosopher Immanuel Kant. Included among his publications is a translation of Kant's extensive "Critique of Pure Reason" in 1949. He also achieved widespread national and international recognition within academic circles for his scholarship, commentary and encyclopedic knowledge of Kant's philosophical works. His comprehensive work, A Commentary on Kant's Critique of Practical Reason (1960) was praised by Professor A. R. C. Duncan at Queen's University as "an unquestionably first-rate piece of Kantian scholarship which ranks along with the great German, French, and British commentaries on Kant." In addition, he has been cited in Kant-Studien as one of the first scholars in the Anglo-Saxon tradition to compile a comprehensive review of early German philosophy before Kant and clarifying Kant's work within such a historical context.

External images
- You may see Lewis White Beck lecturing at Emory University in 1938; Here on usg.edu
- Lewis White Beck at the University of Rochester; Here on archive.org

In the course of his exhaustive commentaries, Beck shared several noteworthy insights into Kant's philosophical thoughts. While revisiting Kant's distinction between "analytic" and "synthetic" truths and his concept of the "synthetic a priori," Beck attempted to clarify Kant's reasoning by exploring whether synthetic judgements should be made analytic, as well as whether Kant incorrectly identified some "contingent judgements" as "necessary judgements". He further observed that Kant's utilization of the term "synthetic" appears to convey different meanings in Kant's writings on transcendental logic as compared to his writings on the theory of general logic. Beck observed further that this divergence in meaning accounts for the unfortunate confusion in the minds of many students who explore translations of Kant's works from the original German into English.

Beck also asserted that Kant's Critique of Practical Reason has been largely neglected by modern readers and sometimes supplanted in the minds of many scholars by the Foundations of the Metaphysics of Morals. He claimed that a complete understanding of Kant's moral philosophy is most easily attained by reviewing Kant's "second critique" which puts forth an analysis of the concepts of both freedom and practical reason. In his A Commentary on Kant's Critique of Practical Reason (1961) Beck asserts that Kant's "second critique" serves to weave these divers strands into a unified pattern for his theory on moral authority in general.

In addition, Beck argues that Kant revised his initial resolution of the antimony between the two concepts of freedom and determinism which was first presented in the Critique of Pure Reason. In Beck's view, this revision emerges in Kant's resolution of the "Antimony of Teleological Judgment" which is presented in his "third critique", the Critique of the Power of Judgment (1790).

External image
- You may read Lewis White Beck's analysis of Kant's Antinomy of Pure Reason: in the Dictionary of the History of Ideas Vol. I (1973); Here in the University of Virginia Library

Beck also traced the development of the "antinomy of pure reason," which Kant described as "the most singular phenomenon of human reason." Beck observed that Kant's development of the "antinomy" may have been influenced by its use in jurisprudence, biblical exegesis, and the antinomic mode of argument employed by the Greek philosopher Zeno. Such a "skeptical method" avoids the objective of resolving a conflict between opposing assertions by favoring one assertion over another. Instead, it emphasizes an investigation into whether the object of the controversy itself is deceptive in nature.

In his Essays on Kant and Hume (1978), Beck also demonstrated Kant's use of the contemporary Ramsey's Maxim to resolve several philosophical disputes which were problematic in his own century. As Beck noted, Kant's methodology calls to mind Ramsey's realization that, "in cases where two opposed arguments seem internally sound but where their conclusions are incompatible and hence a stalemate is created...'the truth lies not in one of the two disputed views, but in some third possibility which has not yet been thought of, which we can only discover by rejecting something assumed as obvious by both the disputants.' ". By adopting this maxim, Kant was able to argue for a potential resolution of the dispute between the followers of Friedrich Leibniz and David Hume over the question of whether mathematics applied to experience. This was accomplished by suggesting that both groups of disputants had unknowingly adopted the false assumption that mathematical judgements are logically necessary. Turning once again to the use of a military metaphor, Beck noted that Kant adopted the same methodology to reconcile the philosophical combatants following John Locke and Friedrich Leibnitz in reference to the question of what characterizes the single source of knowledge. As Beck noted, Kant resolved the dispute by calling into question the veracity of the dogmatic assumption which both combatants unknowingly adopted, namely that "there is but one ultimate source or faculty of knowledge." Beck noted further that Kant's resolutions might be accurately summarized by the proposition that, "In order to know and to act, it is necessary both to see and to think."

Beck cites the second chapter of the Transcendental Dialectic in the Critique of Pure Reason to argue that Kant's development of the antimony played a central role in his effort, "to dispel the illusion that pure reason can give knowledge of what lies beyond the limits of sensory perception" while asserting that "the world we experience is not and does not contain a thing in itself but is only phenomenal." He then traces the influence of Kant's antimonies on the works of later philosophers including Charles Renouvier and Nicolai Hartmann.

In his essay "What Have We Learned from Kant" (1984), Beck concluded that Kant's conception of the human self emobodied aspects of both the Copernican revolution and the ancient Greek Promethean myth which also remain relevant even within the modern era. In Beck's view, Kant conceived of the human self as a creative and active agent who strives to seize a fundamentally divine prerogative to legislate universal order in both the natural and moral spheres. Ultimately, however, mankind also remains a finite and fallible being, who must subject the utilization of his creativity to the limits and criticisms imposed upon him by human reason.

==== Secular philosophy ====
In his Six Secular Philosophers (1966, Rev. 1997), Beck also endeavored to explore the general characteristics of a secular philosophy and whether such a philosophy can be formulated to accommodate religious beliefs and values. Beck observed that while an exact or precise conceptualization of a secular philosophy might be elusive, a secular philosophy is likely to require an appeal to an independence of thought. In Beck's view it should also incorporate certain aspects of religious thought as well. With this in mind, Beck identified several "families" of secular philosophers. In his first group Beck calls our attention to philosophers who placed limits on the scope, validity and content of religious belief by an appeal to scientific and philosophic endeavors. He identifies Baruch Spinoza, David Hume and Kant in this grouping. In his second grouping, Beck identified Friedrich Nietzsche, William James and George Santayana, each of whom explored the relationship of religious values in general to other values in life. Beck asserted that Kant ultimately could not embrace Spinoza's embrace of substance or his appeal to monism. According to Beck, Kant agreed instead with Hume that a scientific interpretation of nature cannot serve by itself to confirm religious belief. According to Beck, Kant also parted ways with Hume, however, by insisting that a different rational basis for religious thought can be found in mankind's moral consciousness.

==== Humanism and science ====
In his book The Actor and the Spectator (1975), Beck embarked upon an attempt to "contrast and assess" the two accounts of human nature which are sometimes put forth by spectators of mankind's behavior: scientists and humanists. In Beck's view, the former are generally inclined to regard man as little more that a "cog in the machinery of the world" as described in the philosophy of mechanism, while the latter frequently characterize him as an "autonomous and self-creating" being. While Beck hints at being sympathetic to the humanistic interpretation, he is also careful to avoid any temptation to rebuke the scientific interpretation through the use of argumentation. Rather than advancing an "argument" in support of the truth or falsehood of the scientific interpretation, Beck patiently offers a reductio ad absurdum criticism and reminds his readers that no rationale argument could in theory be formulated to prove the veracity of such a "machine theory" since it is by its very nature "self-stulifying". Stated otherwise, if the theory is in fact true, there can be no reason to uphold a belief in its veracity since in a community of machines all questions about reasoning could never arise in the first place. Reasoners cannot act intelligibly by regarding themselves as machines. As Beck diplomatically reminds his readers: "If you believe that you are not a machine, but that I am (then) I do not know why you are reading this book". He further suggests that while Skinnerian Behaviorism may serve as a rich model for psychology, "whatever plausibility the machine theory has- and it has much plausibility and is a rich model for psychology and neurology- it gains by being associated with a self-exemption clause". Beck also embarks upon an exploration of several topics in his book including the nature of thought, human behavior and the nature of free will.

In the 1940s, Beck also criticized the temptation to misuse the principle of parsimony in the logic of explanation found in the sciences. Beck cautioned that science assigns equal metaphysical importance to both the principle of parsimony and the principle of sufficient reason. He further argued that while the search for the smallest number of simplest causes in any explanation may be a necessary condition for an adequate explanation, it is not sufficient and that care must be taken to ensure that the explanation is adequate to the task of clarifying the facts. Simply stated,

"Parsimony is not itself a simple criterion of a good methodology; we cannot simply count the factors of explanation and say that the theory containing the smallest number is the best. The ideal of parsimony cannot be expressed without the proviso that the conditions for which it is a norm shall themselves be adequate."

==== Conscious and unconscious motives ====
Beck's scholarly publications also reflect his interest in philosophical topics which are not prima facia directly related to the works of Immanuel Kant. In 1966 he published a detailed philosophical examination of the characteristics of mankind's conscious and unconscious motives entitled Conscious and Unconscious Motives. In 1968, he also collaborated with his colleague Robert L. Holmes at the University of Rochester in the book Philosophic Inquiry: An Introduction to Philosophy.

==== Extraterrestrial life ====
Years later in 1971, Beck also presented his insights into the topic of searching for extraterrestrial life for the sixty-eighth annual Eastern Meeting of the American Philosophical Association in New York City in a paper which he entitled Extraterrestrial Intelligent Life. In this work, Beck traces the evolution of philosophical speculation concerning the presence of intelligent extraterrestrial life forms starting with the ancient writings of Lucretius, Plutarch and Aristotle, to the contributions made by Copernicus and culminating in the modern age within the works Darwin, Immanuel Kant, William Whewell and Marx. He argues that our ancestors in the sixteenth and seventeenth centuries were plagued by a profound pessimism over the decline of the natural world due to mankind's sinfulness and consequently sought redemption by searching for the presence of "higher beings" within the universe. Similarly, in modern times, mankind's despair and technological shock is due in part to his pollution of the natural world and in part due to repeated failures of moral belief. Complicating matters further, Beck notes that, "the only species on earth which prides itself on its intelligence is the only one with the intelligence necessary, and possibly sufficient, to render itself extinct tomorrow." He argues further that deeply seated religious, philosophical and existential beliefs are serving to perpetuate the comforting archetypal idea that mankind is not alone in the universe. Beck concludes on an optimistic note, however, by suggesting that while the quest for other or superior forms of life in the universe may not prove successful, it may yield beneficial consequences by assisting mankind in the actualization of better ways of life here on Earth.

==== Man as creator ====
Beck was also intrigued by the concept of "man as a creator". His analysis of the history of philosophy within the Western tradition, traces the dynamic interaction of Kant's idea of the "land of truth", in which man's creativity evolves within the context of his search for knowledge, with the creative idea of an "unknowable beyond", which was first cultivated by philosophers of the ancient world. In Beck's view, the Platonic idea of a creative yet hidden ultimate reality now functions as a more dominant paradigm in the form of a nervus probandi within our modern systems of thought and ethical values. He notes that three responses to such a paradigm shift have emerged. In the first, philosophers deny the existence of such a transcendent "unknowable beyond" by asserting that it is merely the product of human imagination which can be easily dismissed. As examples, Beck cites the works of Karl Marx, Friedrich Nietzsche, and various positivistic scholars. The second possible response has been adopted by scholars who accept that such a hidden reality exists and that it can be known through either philosophical reasoning, mystical insight or a combination of both. As examples, Beck points to the works of both Plato and Georg Hegel. Lastly, Beck observes yet a third response incorporates the assertion that such an "unknowable beyond" may exist but that mankind is "indefeasibly" ignorant of it. Beck argues that Thomas Acquinas, Blaise Pascal, Søren Kierkegaard, William James and Immanuel Kant all adopt variations on this theme In this view, man is a creator of order only within narrow limits and cannot acquire definitive knowledge of the "unknowable beyond." Nevertheless, such a realm is clearly of paramount existential importance. Therefore, instead of professing "knowledge" of its existence, mankind is advised to knowingly acknowledge his ignorance and affirm its existence purely as an act of faith. Beck himself seems partial to this view when he gently reminds his readers that:

"It is not my place to tell you whether there is indefeasible ignorance of ultimate reality. I am ignorant of whether there is or is not. But you should think of these things because there are no things more important, though there are no questions more difficult or less answerable. But one's whole life may be changed if one changes his mind about these questions."

==== Causal and rational explanations ====
An additional central theme which emerges in several of Beck's philosophical writings is the importance of recognizing the distinction between a causal explanation of both natural events and human behavior, as contrasted with a rational explanation or justification of human actions. In Beck's view, these constitute two entirely different perspectives on essentially the same subject matter. Consequently, neither view can claim to be metaphysically superior in its nature when compared to the alternate view. Stated more simply, causal explanations of human behavior when considered on one hand and rational assessments of actions when considered on the other hand, are rendered compatible with each other only by the recognition that they represent a regulative ideal in mankind's conduct of inquiry. As the Kantian scholar Paul Guyer has observed, the conclusion that, "neither represents a metaphysically privileged point of view" is a central theme in much of Beck's philosophical and interpretive work. In short, Beck's resolution of the apparent incompatibility of these two ideals illustrates the profound influence of Kant's work on his own philosophical perspective.

=== Honours ===
In addition to receiving fellowships from the Rosenwald Fund in 1937, the Guggenheim Foundation in 1957, the American Academy of Arts and Sciences in 1963, and the American Council of Learned Societies in 1964, Beck was the first recipient of the University Of Rochester's Edward Peck Curtis Award for Excellence in Undergraduate Teaching in 1962.

In addition, Beck was the recipient of several honorary degrees from several leading scholarly institutions, including Hamilton College, Emory University, and the University of Tubingen. He was also an honorary member of the Kant Society in Germany.

In 2001 Beck was honored by several prominent scholars and the philosopher Predrag Cicovaki with the publication of Kant's Legacy: Essays in Honor of Lewis White Beck. The leading scholar of German philosophy Walter Kaufmann also paid special tribute to Beck's scholarship in his work Goethe, Kant and Hegel in 1980.

=== Death ===
Beck retired in 1979 and died in 1997 at age 83 in Rochester, New York. He was survived by his wife Caroline as well as his two sons Brandon and Hamilton along with two grandsons.

== Professional affiliations ==
Lewis White Beck was both an active member and a member emeritus of the American Philosophical Association. He served as President of the American Philosophical Association- Eastern Division in 1971 as well as the chairman of its board of officers (1974–1977). He also served as the president of the North East Society for 18th Century Studies in 1974.

== Selected publications ==
- You may read Lewis White Beck's: A Commentary on Kant's Critique of Practical Reason (1960); Studies in the Philosophy of Kant (1965); Early German Philosophy: Kant and His Predecessors (1969); Essays on Kant and Hume (1978) and additional publications Here on Archive.org

- Lewis White Beck's PhD Thesis: Synopsis: A Study In The Theory Of Knowledge (1937); Here on Open Library

During his long academic career, Lewis White Beck published several books and numerous scholarly articles which include the following works.

=== Books ===
- Philosophic Inquiry: An Introduction to Philosophy (1952)
- A Commentary on Kant's Critique of Practical Reason (1960)
- On History (1963)
- Studies in the Philosophy of Kant (1965)
- Six Secular Philosophers (1966) Rev. (1997)
- 18th-Century Philosophy (1966) Editor: Lewis White Beck
- Early German Philosophy: Kant and His Predecessors (1969)
- Kant's Theory of Knowledge Editor: Lewis White Beck (1974)
- The Actor and the Spectator (1975)
- Essays on Kant and Hume (1978)
- Mr. Boswell dines with Professor Kant (1979)
- Essays by Lewis White Beck: Five Decades as a Philosopher (1998) Editor: Predrag Cicovaki

=== Journal articles ===
- "The Synoptic Method", The Journal of Philosophy (1939):337-345
- "The Formal Properties of Ethical Wholes", The Journal of Philosophy (1941):5-15
- "The Principle of Parsimony in Empirical Science", The Journal of Philosophy (1943):617-633
- "Judgements of Meaning in Art". The Journal of Philosophy (1944):169-178
- "Secondary Quality". The Journal of Philosophy (1946):599-610
- "Potentiality, Property, And Accident". The Philosophical Review (1947):613-630
- "The Distinctive Traits of An Empirical Method". The Journal of Philosophy (1947):337-344
- "The "Natural Science Ideal" In The Social Sciences". The Scientific Monthly (1949):386-394
- "Remarks on the Distinction Between Analytic and Synthetic". Philosophy and Phenomenological Research (1949):720-727
- "Psychology and the Norms of Knowledge". Philosophy and Phenomenological Research (1954):494-506
- "Kant's Theory of Definition". The Philosophical Review (1956):179-191
- "On the Meta-Semantics of the Problem of the Synthetic Apriori". Mind (1957):228-232
- "Conscious and Unconscious Motives". Mind (1966):155-179
- "Kant's Strategy". Journal of the History of Ideas (1967):224-236
- "Kant on the Uniformity of Nature". Synthese (1981):449-464
- "What Have We Learned from Kant?", Self and Nature in Kant's Philosophy Ed. Allen W. Wood (1984), Cornell University Press, Ithaca, N.Y. 1984 Chapter I
- "Five Concepts of Freedom In Kant". Stephan Körner — Philosophical Analysis and Reconstruction Ed. Jan T. J. Srzednicki (1987):35-51

=== Translations ===
- Kant, Immanuel (1950). Lewis White Beck (ed.). Prolegomena to Any Future Metaphysics That Will Be Able to Present Itself as a Science. New York: Bobbss Merrill Educational Publishing – via Internet Archive.
- Kant, Immanuel (1956). Critique of Practical Reason. Translated by Lewis White Beck. New York: The Liberal Arts Press – via Internet Archive.
- Kant, Immanuel (1997). The Foundations of the Metaphysics of Morals and What is Enlightenment. Translated by Lewis White Beck (2nd ed.). Upper Saddle River, NJ: Prentice Hall Inc. ISBN 978-0-02-307825-5 – via Internet Archive.

=== Archived works ===
- The Lewis White Beck Papers collection was gifted to the University of Rochester for archival purposes by Professor Beck in 1960, 1965, 1969 and 1975. The manuscripts and notes contained within the collection are accessible to scholars and research students within the University of Rochester's Rare Books and Special Collections Library upon request.
- The Lewis White Beck manuscripts of Immanuel Kant's Critique of Practical Reason and Other Writings in Moral Philosophy Collection at the University of Delaware contains various drafts, galley proofs, page proofs and the published edition of Professor Beck's translations and editing of Immanuel Kant's work as completed during his tenure at Delaware University from 1943 to 1948 and is open both to researchers and scholars.

== See also ==
- American philosophy
