= Mind's eye (disambiguation) =

The phrase mind's eye refers to the human ability for visualization.

Mind's eye may also refer to:

== Film, television and radio ==
- Mind's Eye (film series), a series of animated films
- Mind's Eye (radio series), a set of five dramas about the paranormal
- The Mind's Eye (film), a 2015 action-horror film about telekinetics
- The Mind's Eye (publisher), an American radio theater company
- The Mind's Eye & Mission of the Viyrans, a pair of Doctor Who audio stories
- Mind's Eye (aka The Black Hole), a 2016 film with Dean Cain

=== Television episodes ===
- "Mind's Eye" (Men of a Certain Age)
- "Mind's Eye" (The X-Files)
- "The Mind's Eye" (Star Trek: The Next Generation)
- "Mind's Eye", an episode of Women: Stories of Passion

== Literature ==
- Mind's Eye (novel), a 1999 novel by Paul Fleischman
- The Mind's Eye (Sacks book), a 2010 book by Oliver Sacks
- The Mind's Eye (novel), a 1993 novel by Håkan Nesser
- Engineering and the Mind's Eye, a 1992 book by Eugene S. Ferguson

== Music ==
- Mind's Eye (album), a 1986 album by Vinnie Moore, or the title song
- Mind's Eye (band), a Swedish progressive metal band with Johan Niemann
- Mind's Eye (band), an American Indie/Alternative rock band from California
- "Mind's Eye" (song), a song by Wolfmother
- "Mind's Eye", a song by Goldfinger from Goldfinger
- "Mind's Eye", a song by Josh Ritter from The Historical Conquests of Josh Ritter
- The Mind's Eye (album), a 1994 album by Stiltskin
- "The Mind's Eye", a song by Dark Tranquillity from The Mind's I
- "The Mind's Eye", a song by Haken from Visions
- "Mind's Eye", a song by DC Talk from Jesus Freak
- "Mind's Eye", a song by Joe Morris from Elsewhere

== Other uses ==
- Mind's Eye (US military), a video-analysis research project
- Mind's Eye Theatre, a live action role-playing game
- Mind's Eye, a site in the Cayman Islands on the 2012 World Monuments Watch list
- Mind's Eye relief sculpture by Peter Randall-Page in Cathays Park, Cardiff.
- MindsEye, a 2025 video game

== See also ==
- Aphantasia, the inability to create mental imagery
- Mind's Eye Entertainment, a Canadian film studio
- The Mind's I, a 1981 book by Douglas R. Hofstadter and Daniel C. Dennett
- The Mind's I (album), a 1996 album by Dark Tranquillity
- My Mind's Eye (disambiguation)
- Third eye or inner eye, a mystical and esoteric concept
