= Design tool =

Objects, media, or computer programs, which can be used to design

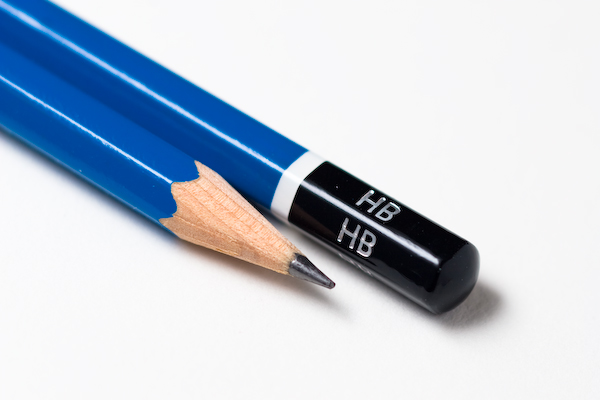
The pencil is one of the most basic and most popular graphic design tools.

Design tools are objects, media, or computer programs, which can be used to design. They may influence the process of production, expression and perception of design ideas and therefore need to be applied skillfully.

== Objects ==
New ideas can come by way of experimenting with tools and methods. Some designers explore ideas using pencil and paper. Others use many different mark-making tools and resources from computers to sculpture as a means of inspiring creativity. Traditionally, objects like pencil, compass, ruler, drawing triangle have been considered design tools and have been used to characterize design and designers. One reason for the success of traditional design tools such as pencil and paper is that these tools can be used without any special knowledge and their usage facilitates a continuous flow of thoughts.

== Media ==
The appropriate development and presentation tools can substantially change how an audience perceives a project. The media used for design can be divided in two categories, visual and verbal. Conventionally, in areas like architecture, industrial design, or graphic design, visual media are considered more important than verbal media. In other areas like engineering, the use of verbal design media may be prevalent.

=== Visual ===
Visual design tools are, for example, gesture, sketch, drawing, scale model, perspective drawing, photograph, film, video. Eugene S. Ferguson's 1977 paper in Science, entitled "The mind's eye: Nonverbal thought in technology", is credited for clarifying the role of visual reasoning in the thinking process. In this article he reasoned that "Thinking with pictures is an essential strand in the intellectual history of technological development." He concludes his article with the following statement:

Much of the creative thought of the designers of our technological world is nonverbal, not easily reducible to words; its language is an object or a picture or a visual image in the mind. It is out of this kind of thinking that the clock, printing press, and snowmobile have arisen. Technologists, converting their nonverbal knowledge into objects directly (as when an artisan fashioned an American ax) or into drawings that have enabled others to build what was in their minds, have chosen the shape and many of the qualities of our man-made surroundings. This intellectual component of technology, which is non-literary and non-scientific, has been generally unnoticed because its origins lie in art and not in science.
As the scientific component of knowledge in technology has increased markedly in the 19th and 20th centuries, the tendency has been to lose sight of the crucial part played by nonverbal knowledge in making the "big" decisions of form, arrangement, and texture, that determine the parameters within which a system will operate.

In his work claims Ferguson that visual reasoning is a widely used tool used in creating technological artefacts. There is ample evidence that visual methods, particularly drawing, play a central role in creating artefacts.

=== Verbal ===
Verbal design tools are, for example, metaphor, description, discussion, critique, theory, algorithm, calculation, program.

== Computer programs ==
Computer programs have many functions which can be discussed in terms of design tools. One of the most widely used design tools is computer-aided design (CAD) software like Autodesk Inventor, DSS SolidWorks, or Pro Engineer which enables designers to create 3D models, 2D drawings, and schematics of their designs. CAD together with Digital Mockup (DMU) and CAE software such as finite element method analysis or analytic element method allows designers to create models of designs that can be analyzed without having to make expensive and time-consuming physical prototypes.

There is some debate whether computers enhance the creative process of design. Rapid production from the computer allows many designers to explore multiple ideas quickly with more detail than what could be achieved by traditional hand-rendering or paste-up on paper, moving the designer through the creative process more quickly. However, being faced with limitless choices does not help isolate the best design solution and can lead to endless iterations with no clear design outcome. A designer may use sketches to explore multiple or complex ideas quickly without the distractions and complications of software.

== See also ==
- Design method
- Design strategy
- Reflective practice
- Computer-aided design

== Bibliography ==
- Design - Creativity and Materialization. Cottbus, 1999, ISSN 1434-0984, online at: http://www.cloud-cuckoo.net/openarchive/wolke/eng/Subjects/subject991.html
- Elke Krasny: Architektur beginnt im Kopf - The Making of Architecture. Basel, Boston, Berlin: Birkhäuser, 2008, ISBN 978-3764389796
