= Kestrel (surveillance system) =

Kestrel is a wide-area motion imagery (or persistent surveillance) system used on aerostats at U.S. forward operating bases in Afghanistan to monitor the surrounding areas. Developed by Logos Technologies, the system is equipped with electro-optical and infrared cameras, providing day/night force protection and overwatch to troops.

== Development ==
Kestrel has its roots in Constant Hawk, a wide-area sensor suite developed by Logos Technologies as well, in 2006, for use on crewed U.S. Army aircraft.

In late 2010, the ISR Task Force and Army requested a version of Constant Hawk for aerostats. Contracted through the U.S. Naval Air Systems Command, the Kestrel program delivered four units the following year. However, these first four Kestrels lacked an infrared capability, and by June 2012, were replaced by 10 day/night systems and six spares.

In 2017, Logos Technologies unveiled its even lighter Kestrel Block II wide-area motion imagery system at the International Defence Exhibition & Conference, in Abu Dhabi. This new sensor saw its first sale to a military customer the following year.

== Capabilities ==
Kestrel employs six cameras housed in a gimbal, providing a 360-degree panoramic view of “a city-sized” area” in medium resolution. The system allows operators to track multiple suspects at once and can automatically monitor user-designated zones. Kestrel transmits imagery to the user in real time and can also record up to 30 days of events.

The next-generation Kestrel Block II shares those same capabilities, but in a smaller and lighter form factor (less than 85 pounds, or 40 kg, versus 150 pounds, or 68 kg).

== Civilian Use ==
The Kestrel system also has applications for border security. In March 2012, the Science and Technology Directorate of the Department of Homeland Security conducted a seven-day demonstration of Kestrel in Nogales, Ariz. Kestrel was mounted on an aerostat and worked in coordination with a high-resolution full motion video camera. The purpose of the test was to see how well Kestrel could detect and track illegal entrants, drug smugglers and gunrunners crossing the U.S.-Mexican border.

Since its deployment in Afghanistan and testing along the U.S.-Mexico border, Kestrel has led to the development of other wide-area sensors, such as Simera. Also an aerostat-mounted system, Simera is composed of 13 electro-optical cameras and weighs only 40lbs. However, unlike the original Kestrel system, Simera is exportable to non-U.S. countries. Four units were used by Brazil’s Ministry of Justice at the 2016 Olympics, in Rio de Janeiro.

== See also ==
- Autonomous Real-Time Ground Ubiquitous Surveillance Imaging System – Cellphone surveillance system in the US
- Constant Hawk – US Army wide-area motion imagery system
- CorvusEye 1500
- Gorgon Stare – US drone reconnaissance sensor
- Redkite
- Wide-area motion imagery – Approach to surveillance and intelligence gathering
