= Eugene Ferguson =

Eugene Ferguson may refer to:

- Gene Ferguson (born 1947), retired American football player
- Eugene S. Ferguson (1916–2004), engineer and historian of technology
