= TCOM Blue Devil =

Canceled US Air Force reconnaissance airship

Blue Devil blimp

General information
- Type: Reconnaissance airship
- National origin: United States
- Manufacturer: Mav6 LLC
- Status: Canceled
- Primary user: United States Air Force

The Blue Devil blimp was a proposed reconnaissance airship that was built for the United States Air Force for use in the War in Afghanistan. It was designed to capture and process data from onboard sensors before delivering it to ground troops.

== Spy capabilities ==
The blimp was equipped with up to a dozen sensors, including listening devices, video cameras for use both during the day and at night, communications equipment and a system known as the "wide-area airborne surveillance system", which used several cameras to film areas several square miles in size, similar to the Gorgon Stare system. The sensor equipment was to be supplied by Mav6 LLC as the prime contractor and system integrator. To process the data collected, which would ordinarily be transmitted to analysts on the ground, the blimp used an onboard computer to analyze and store the data, which was to be available for troops to access. This would require fewer personnel to analyze the data, and would cause less strain on battlefield networks by transmitting only required information, rather than a constant stream of data.

== Design ==
Total system cost was $211 million. The envelope for the system was completed by subcontractor TCOM LP in Aug. of 2011. The blimp was around 350 feet (110 m) long and 1.4 million cubic feet in volume. It was designed to be able to reach an altitude of 4 miles (6.4 km) and remain at altitude for up to a week. The aircraft's first flight was planned for 15 October 2011.

== Delays and cancellation ==
Technical complications with the blimp's design that arose during 2011, including overweight tail fins, unexpectedly complex avionics systems and the inability of the original Argus network of cameras design to be integrated with other systems, and meeting flight requirements of the FAA forced the blimp's first flight back to 15 April 2012, with dramatically reduced capabilities. Since the original cameras, designed to be able to cover 64 square kilometers, were unable to be installed, a different camera pack design, called Angel Fire, was used, which can only cover four square kilometers. Despite the drop in capability, an Air Force analysis of operating costs estimated that the blimp would cost at least four times as much as estimated by MAV 6, another contractor for the project.

In June 2012, the Air Force cancelled the project and ordered the airship to be dismantled and put in storage. In 2013, the Inspector General of the Air Force determined that Air Force personnel did not properly manage the award of contracts for the Blue Devil Block 2 persistent surveillance system.

In 2014, the Air Force banned one of its former generals from doing business with the Air Force because he tried to keep the project going after cancellation.

== See also ==
- Hybrid Air Vehicles HAV 304/Airlander 10
- Wide-area motion imagery
