= PwC Cool Night Classic =

The PwC Cool Night Classic is a 5 km run or 3 km walk held in Brisbane annually for charity.

In its 18th year, the event is organised by PwC and has run every year since 1994. It is a charitable event which to date has raised over AUD$570,000 for charities including Redkite and the Prince Charles Hospital Foundation.

== Course ==
The course begins at River stage at the edge of Brisbane city, traverses over the Goodwill Bridge, through Southbank, over the Victoria Bridge and along a length of the motorway finishing at the QUT side of the Botanical gardens.

== 2012 ==
In 2012, over 5100 runners participated, with over AUD$90,000 raised, making it one of the largest annual fun runs held in Brisbane each year.
