= Short C-23 Sherpa =

Military transport aircraft

C-23 Sherpa
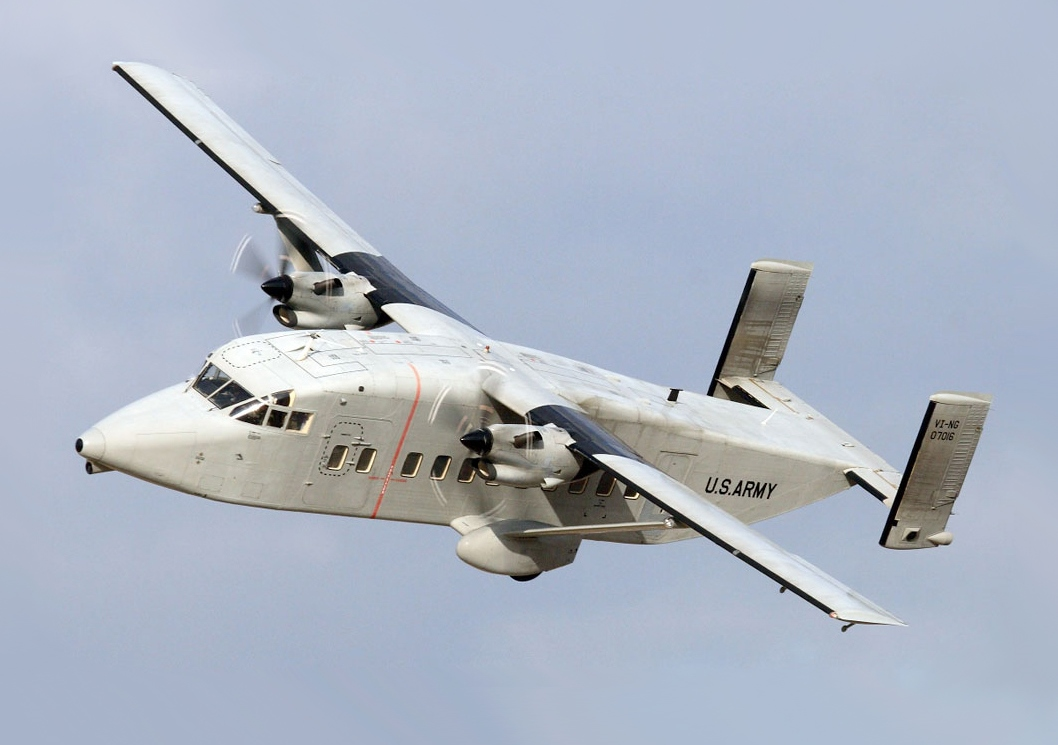
- A US Army C-23 Sherpa over San Diego 2014

General information
- Type: Transport aircraft
- National origin: United Kingdom
- Manufacturer: Short Brothers
- Status: In use with civilian operators
- Primary users: United States Army United States Air Force
- Number built: 60

History
- Manufactured: 1984–1990 (1997)
- Introduction date: 1984
- First flight: 6 August 1984
- Retired: Army National Guard 2014
- Developed from: Short 330 (A, B), Short 360 [B+, C]

The Short C-23 Sherpa is a small military transport aircraft built by Short Brothers. It was designed to operate from unpaved runways and make short takeoff and landings (STOL). It features a large squared fuselage with a full-width rear cargo door/ramp. The C-23A and C-23B are variants of the Short 330 and the C-23B+ is a variant of the Short 360. 60 aircraft were used, it was finally retired from US Army in 2014, but remains in international service. Although it went on to be used for other uses, it was originally the winner of an early 1980s competition for a light cargo aircraft to deliver cargo, especially aviation parts in Western Europe (EDSA). While the C-23 was a new production, as was the C-23B, the C-23B+ were actually Shorts 360, with the tail and rear fuselage of a C-23. One of the differences between the C-23 and C-23B, is that the latter had cabin windows. The aircraft has a substantial amount of civilian use and was also operated by the U.S. Forestry Service and NASA. The aircraft continues in service with the Philippines and Djibouti, as well as various civilian and governmental agencies, though many aircraft have been retired.

The Short C-23 Sherpa was part of family of small to mid-sized twin turbo prop transport aircraft developed in the late 20th century, starting with Short Skyvan, Short 330, and the Short 360. The C-23 was based on the Short 330, and the C-23B+ was based on the Short 360. The original C-23 had very specific purpose, to resupply airfields in Western Europe during the Cold War and entered service in the 1980s. However, it went on afterwards to serve in many different roles. The company that made the aircraft, Short Brothers, was bought by Bombardier in 1989; it was one the earliest commercial aviation companies (founded in 1908).

Short Brothers produced the C-23 from 1984 to 1997.

== Design and development ==
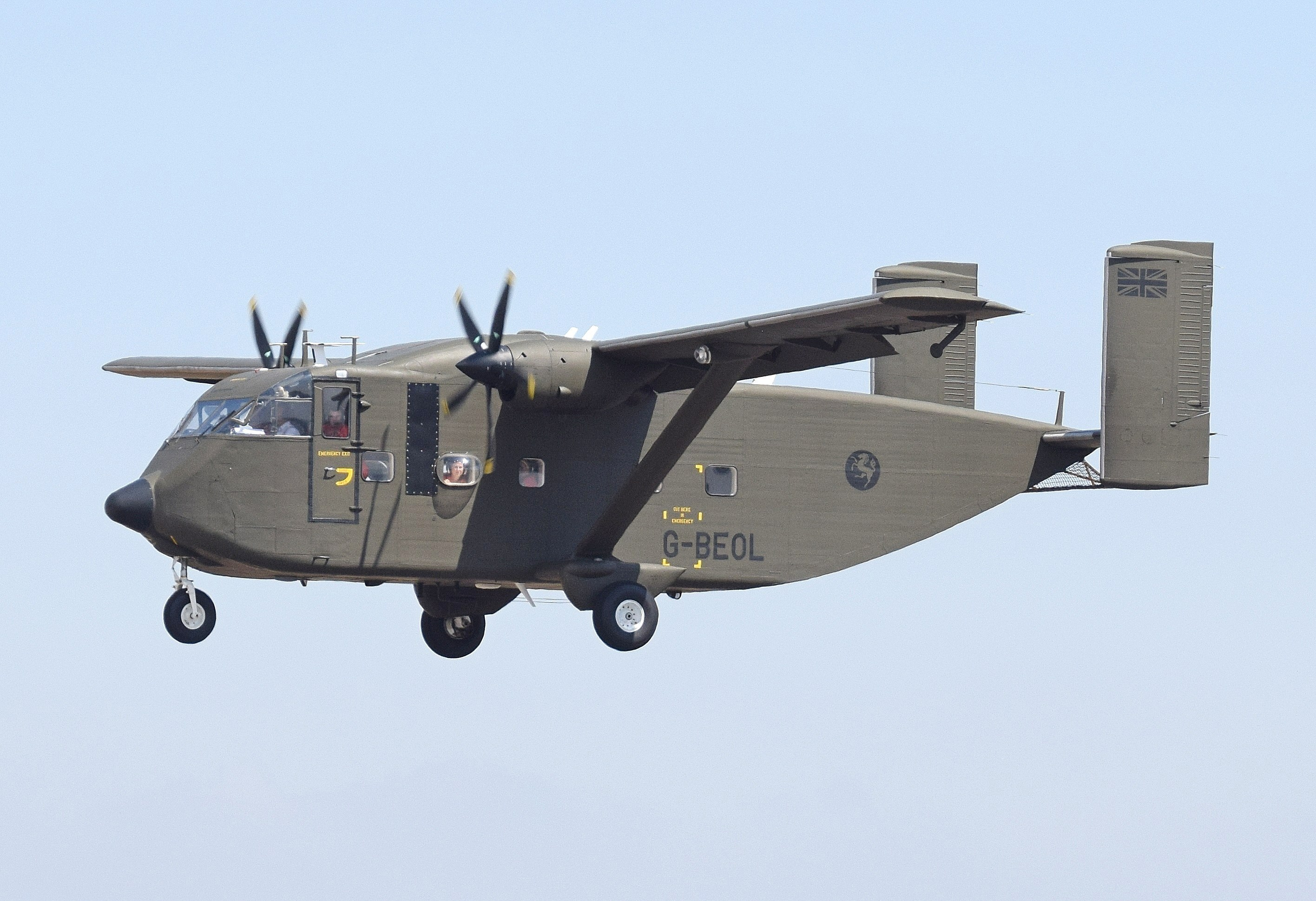
The Short Skyvan, from which the C-23 was developed. The C-23B+ was a combination of C-23 and Shorts 360

The Short 330 was developed by Short Brothers of Belfast from their earlier Short SC.7 Skyvan STOL utility transport. The 330 has a longer wingspan and fuselage than the Skyvan, while retaining the Skyvan's square shaped fuselage cross section, allowing it to carry up to 30 passengers while retaining good short field characteristics. The 330 entered commercial service in 1976.

In addition to the passenger aircraft, Shorts also planned two freight versions. The Short 330-UTT (for Utility Tactical Transport) was a military transport version fitted with a strengthened cabin floor and paratroop doors, which was sold in small numbers, primarily to Thailand, which purchased four. The Short Sherpa was a freighter fitted with a full-width rear cargo door/ramp. This version first flew on 23 December 1982, with the first order for 18 aircraft being placed by the United States Air Force in March 1983. These aircraft were assigned to Military Airlift Command (MAC) for the European Distribution System Aircraft (EDSA) role, flying cargo and personnel between United States Air Forces in Europe (USAFE) air bases. Eventually, 60 would be procured by for the U.S. armed forces and serve well into the 21st century. The C-23 Sherpa was the winner of a competition to enhance cargo delivery in that theater. One of its competitors as that time was the CASA C.212 Aviocar.

The Sherpa's cabin is 6.5 ft (1.98 m) wide, 6.5 ft (1.98 m) high and 29 ft (8.84 m) long. It offers a cargo volume of 1,230 cu ft (34.83 m^{3}), with a cargo capacity of 8,000 lb (3,629 kg). The Sherpa is also capable of operating from unpaved runways and making short takeoff and landings (STOL).

In U.S. military service, the Short 330 was designated C-23A Sherpa. The C-23B Sherpa is similar to the C-23A, but with cabin windows. The C-23B+ Short 360 derivative was created by replacing the rear fuselage of Short 360s obtained on the second-hand market with the twin tail and rear loading ramp of the Short Sherpa.

The C-23 was produced at the Short Brothers' facility in Belfast, Northern Ireland.

In 2024, De Havilland Canada’s did a study to evaluate returning the C-23 Sherpa to production, noting that the aviation market had seen other successful revivals such as the Twin Otter and CL-415 (DHC-515 Firefighter).

== Operational history ==
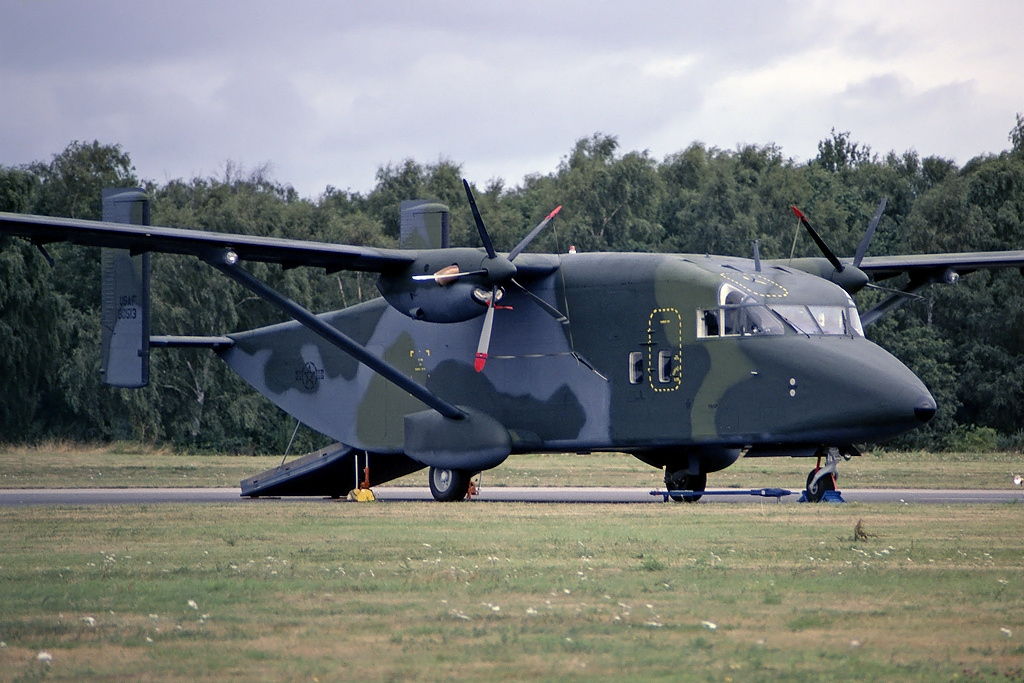
C-23A with aft cargo door down

The C-23 served with USAF starting in the 1980s, and later the U.S. Army. It was retired from the USAF in 1990 and the Army until 2014.

=== U.S. Air Force ===
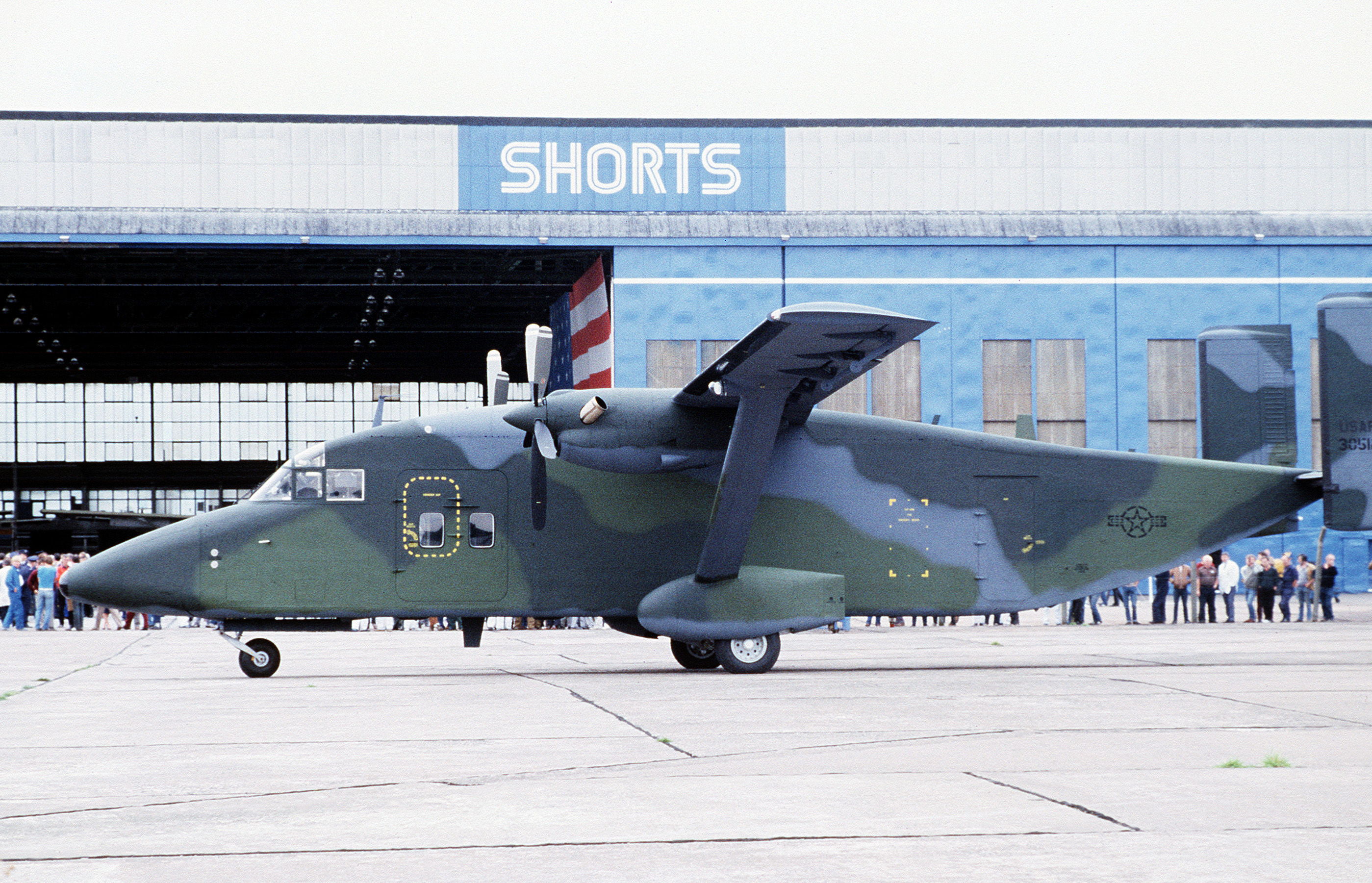
The first C-23A for U.S. Air Force during its official rollout ceremony

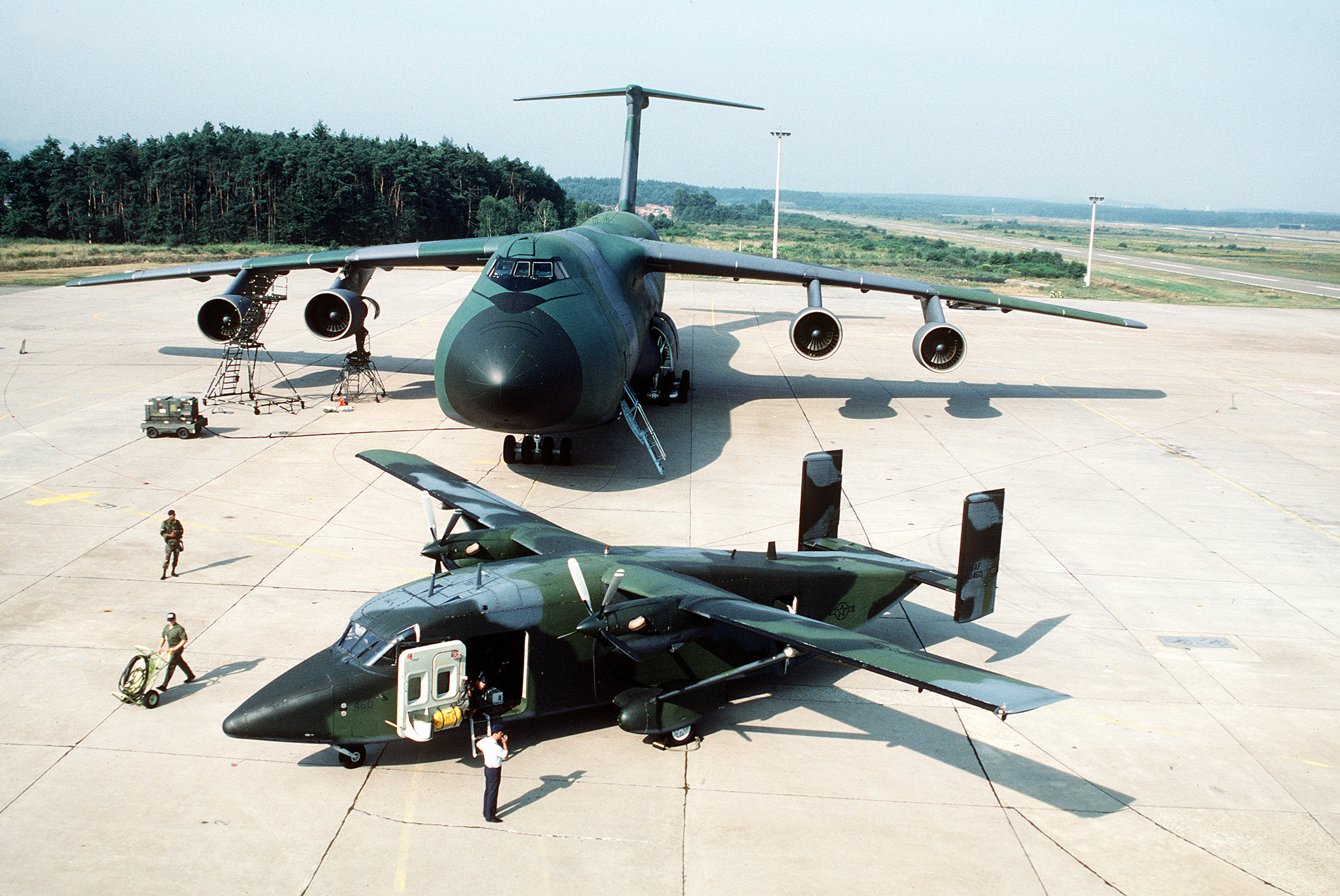
A C-23 Sherpa in center front with a C-5 Galaxy in rear

The C-23A Sherpa entered service with the United States Air Force in Europe in 1985 based at Zweibrücken Air Base. It continued in use in the EDSA role until November 1990 with the post-cold war force reductions. All the Sherpas returned to the United States; three aircraft were transferred to the USAF Test Pilot School at Edwards AFB, eight aircraft went to the U.S. Army and the remaining seven to the U.S. Forest Service. The Test Pilot School's aircraft were retired in 1997.

=== U.S. Army ===
The eight former USAF aircraft were used for test duties at different units; two were re-designated as JC-23A.

The Army purchased four civil Short 330 aircraft to replace the de Havilland Canada C-7 Caribou being used to support the Kwajalein Missile Range. These were not given a C-23 designation, and were retired in 1992. In 1988, the Army ordered ten new-build Short 330s designated C-23B to replace the DHC C-7 Caribou used by the U.S. Army National Guard Aviation and Repair Activity Depots. In 1990, a further six were ordered.

When the Army wanted 20 more C-23s in 1990 the production line had closed; second-hand Short 360 aircraft were purchased instead. Designated C-23B+, these were modified from the original single tail to the twin-tail and cargo ramp of the other C-23Bs. In 1994, another eight aircraft were converted to replace the de Havilland Canada UV-18 Twin Otters used in Alaska. (which was also out of production since 1988)

During Iraq War (2003–2011), the C-23 served the Army's intra-theater needs of cargo and personnel transport. It provided an economic alternative for transporting some 20 people or three pallets of cargo when speed was not critical.

As part of the U.S. Army's Constant Hawk intelligence gathering program, five Short 360s were modified for use in Iraq and flew in theater between 2006 and 2011. A further two modified aircraft collided in mid-air before delivery to Iraq. The Constant Hawk aircraft were not given a military designation.

On 13 June 2007, the Alenia C-27J was selected to replace the C-23 in U.S. Army service. A total of 43 C-23s were in service with the U.S. Army as of November 2008 (all US C-27 aircraft at that time were transferred to the US Coast Guard in 2012 due to budget shortfalls). The C-23 Sherpa was retired from the Army National Guard in January 2014. As part of the National Defense Authorization Act for Fiscal Year 2014, 8 C-23s may be transferred to the State of Alaska to operate from short rural runways for search-and-rescue and medium-lift missions.

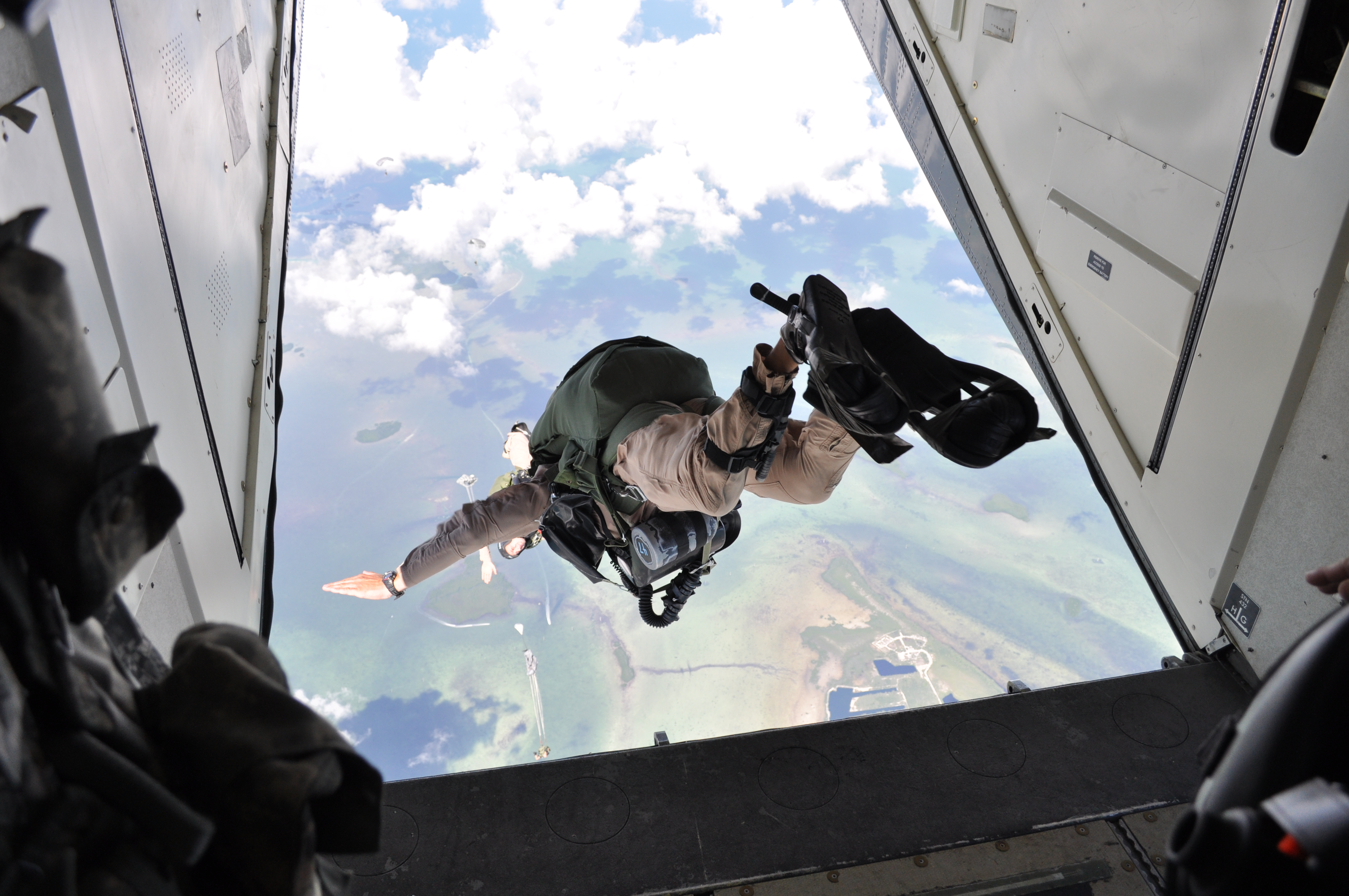
HAHO-type Para jump out of back of C-23, 2010

=== U.S. Army National Guard ===
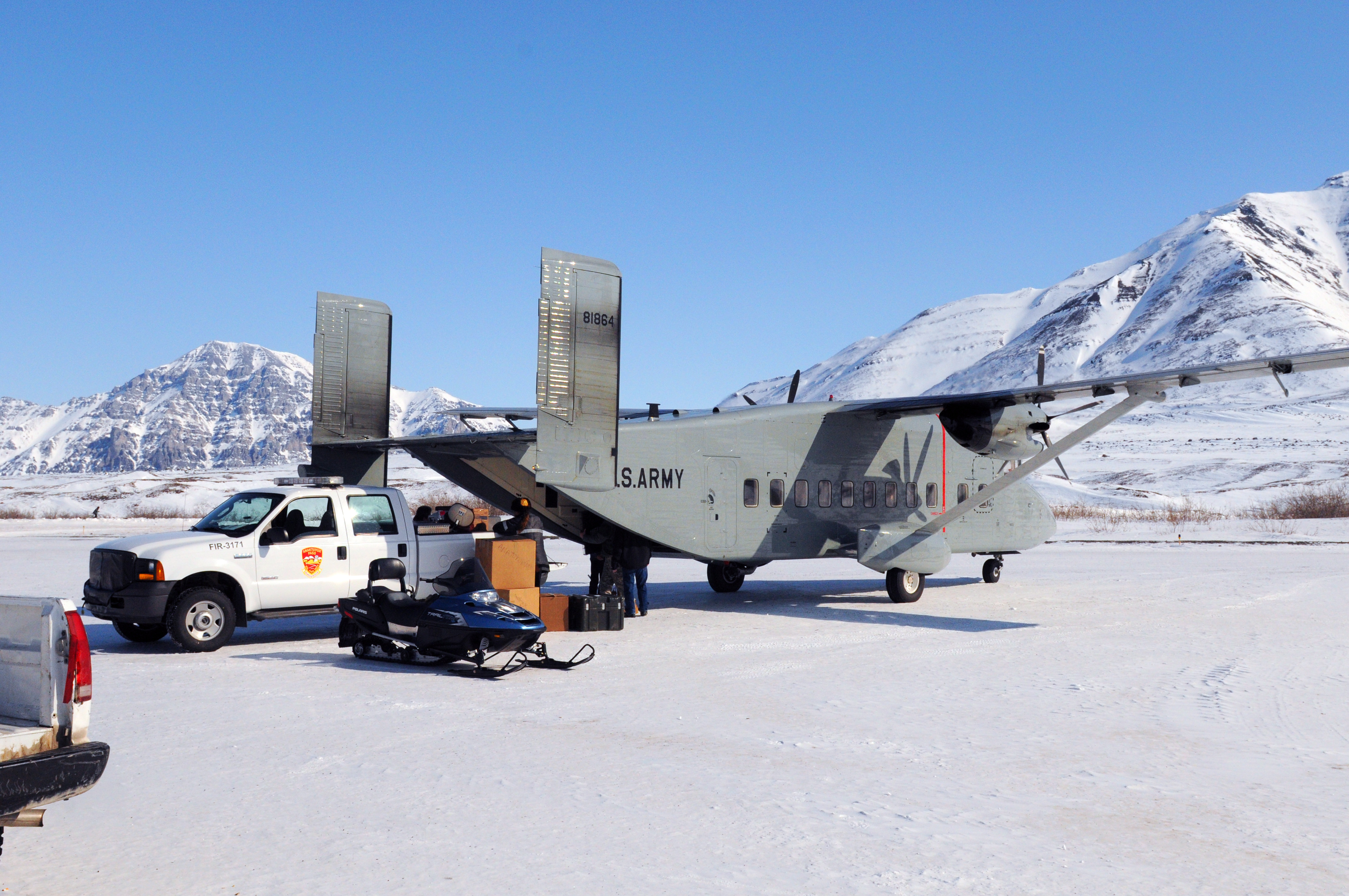
Alaska National Guard C-23 on an unimproved frozen runway in the Alaskan village of Anaktuvuk Pass to deliver medical supplies. (2011)

While the US Army does not operate many fixed wing aircraft besides the Sherpa (due to Key West Agreement), they lost a C-23B in 2001 in Georgia, USA, and 21 died. This was the worst peacetime aviation disaster of the U.S. National Guard.

On 3 March 2001, a C-23B Sherpa belonging to the 171st Aviation Regiment of the Florida Army National Guard was carrying 18 construction workers of the Virginia Air National Guard from Hurlburt Field, Florida to Naval Air Station Oceana, Virginia. The pilot left the flight deck to use the aft bathroom. His weight in the tailcone shifted the center of gravity sufficiently that the airplane became unstable when a patch of severe turbulence was encountered. The violent g-force shifts then encountered rendered the crew unconscious and caused the breakup of the aircraft in flight near Unadilla, Georgia, killing the 21 persons on board. Later calculations determined that the aircraft had been loaded outside its operating envelope at the start of the flight.

The C-23 was retired from Army National Guard service in 2014, having served with distinction in such missions as disaster relief and transport, earning the distinction of being a "workhorse" aircraft.

=== Civilian and governmental use ===
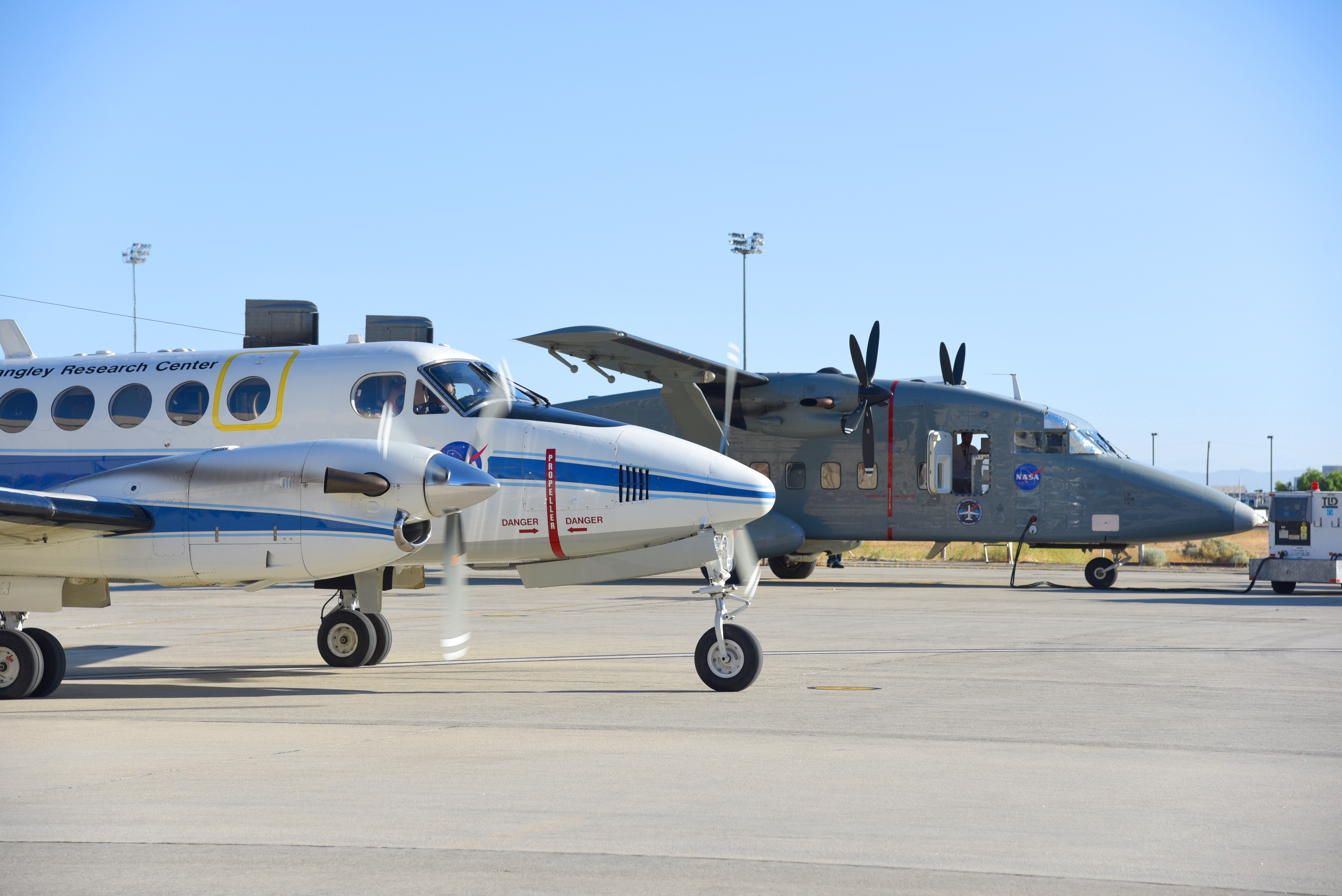
NASA C-23 used for SARP alongside a UC-12B, 2017

Several surplus aircraft were sold to United States operators, who used them to transport equipment and crews to remote work sites.

In 2014 the Army transferred more than dozen C-23 to the U.S. Forestry Service.

NASA operates one C-23 for atmospheric research from Wallops Flight Facility.

== Potential sales ==
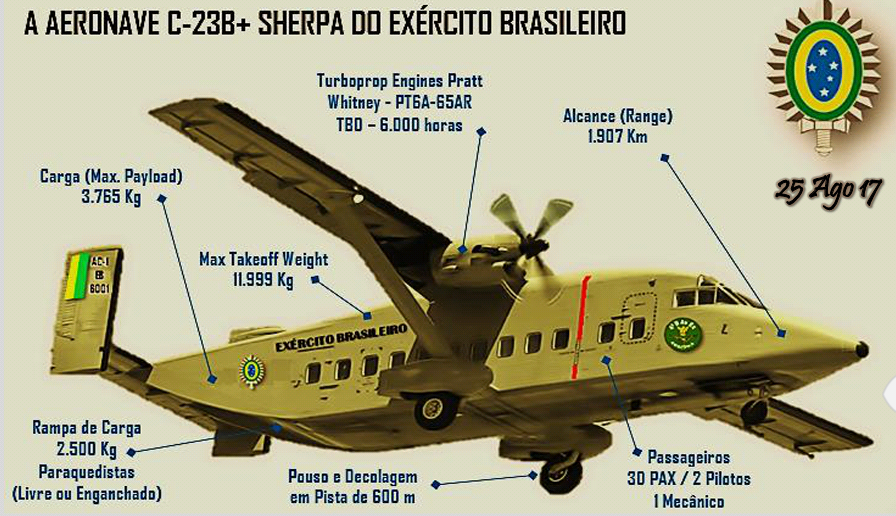
Artist concept of an upgraded Sherpa for the Brazilian Army

In December 2014, it was announced that US would supply eight aircraft to Estonia, Djibouti, and Philippines. Estonia ended up not taking the Sherpa, a decision they reached in 2015 because they could not afford the maintenance, despite the low initial cost procuring of the aircraft. Also, the landing and take off ability of the C-23 was not short enough for their requirement. The Estonians were operating two Antonov An-2, a single engine biplane transport known for its low stall speed. In 2019, the Estonian Air Force received PZL C-145 instead which was a better match for their requirement, they were donated from the USAF which was retiring its fleet.

Brazil briefly considered procuring up to eight upgraded C-23 Sherpas in the late 2010s, for service in the 2020s; the aircraft would be upgraded with new radars, TCAS, and night vision and approved the purchase.

The Brazilian Army Aviation had interest in acquiring eight Sherpa planes to supply its Special Border Platoons in the Amazon. A presidential decree allowed the army to possess fixed-wing aircraft in 2020, but it was revoked just two days after its publication. The acquisition was harshly opposed by air force officers and even some army officers. They considered the heavy expenditure on these aircraft inopportune at a time of scarce resources, preferring that investment be made in the FAB's existing planes.

== Variants ==
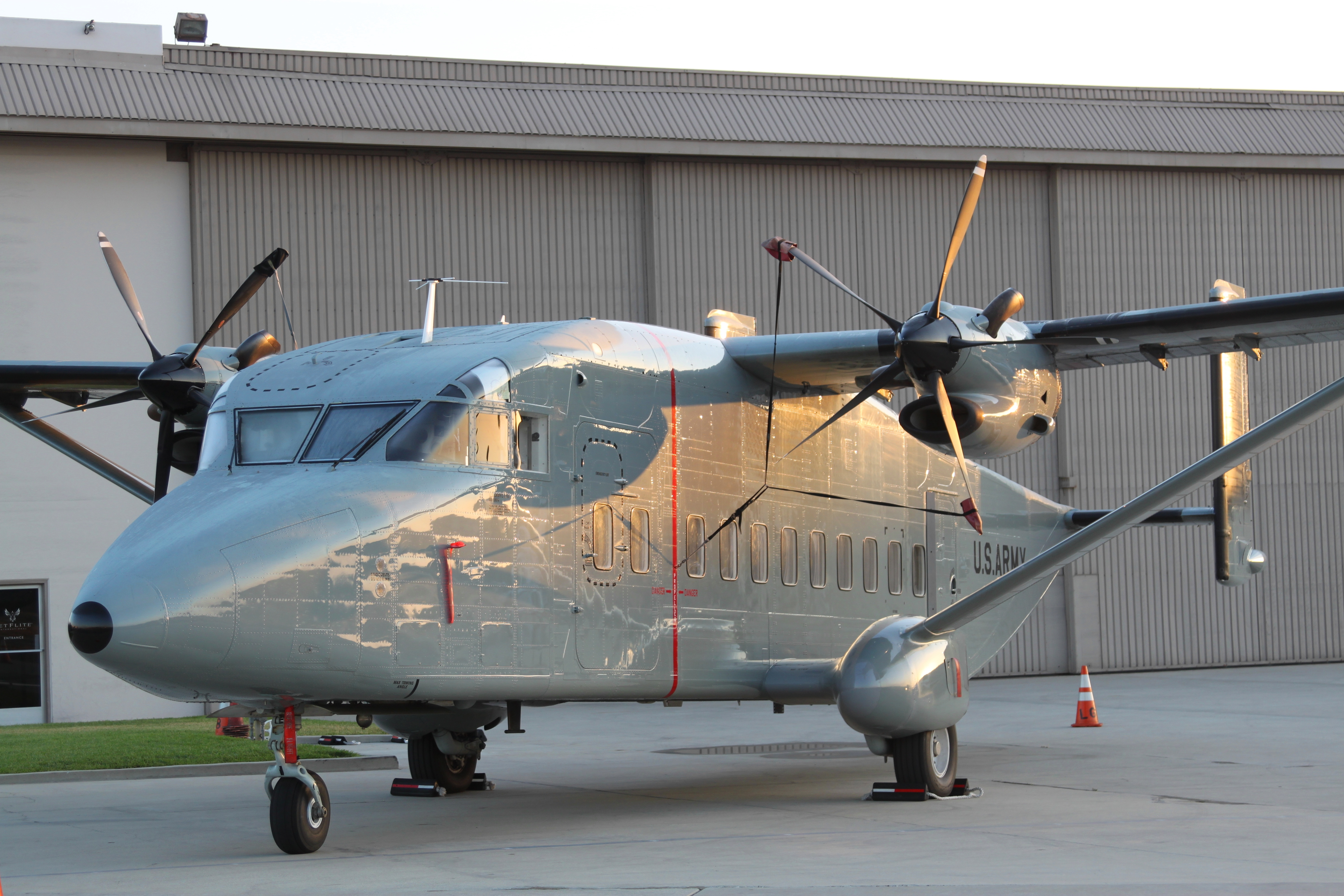
C-23B+ Sherpa

C-23A Sherpa
Twin-engine transport aircraft for the U.S. Air Force based on the Short 330-UTT; it was fitted with a strengthened cabin floor with a roller conveyor system, plus a forward cargo door on the port side of the fuselage, equipped with a hydraulically operated full-width rear cargo door/ramp; 18 built.
C-23B Sherpa
Twin-engine transport aircraft for the US Army National Guard, similar to the C-23A, but with cabin windows, stronger landing-gear, inward-opening paratroop doors at the rear of the fuselage and an air-operable two-section cargo ramp; 16 built.
C-23B+ Super Sherpa
Short 360 aircraft purchased as used aircraft by the U.S. Army and modified by the West Virginia Air Center (WVAC) for the replacement of the rear fuselage of the Short 360, with its single tall fin, with the twin tail and rear loading ramp of the Short Sherpa. 28 civil aircraft were modified.
C-23C
Both C-23B and C-23B+ with flightdeck avionic upgrade under the "Avionics System Cockpit Upgrade" program, 43 modified.
C-23D
C-23C with upgraded avionics under the "Safety Avionics Modification" program from 2010, program was cancelled and only four aircraft were modified.

== Operators ==
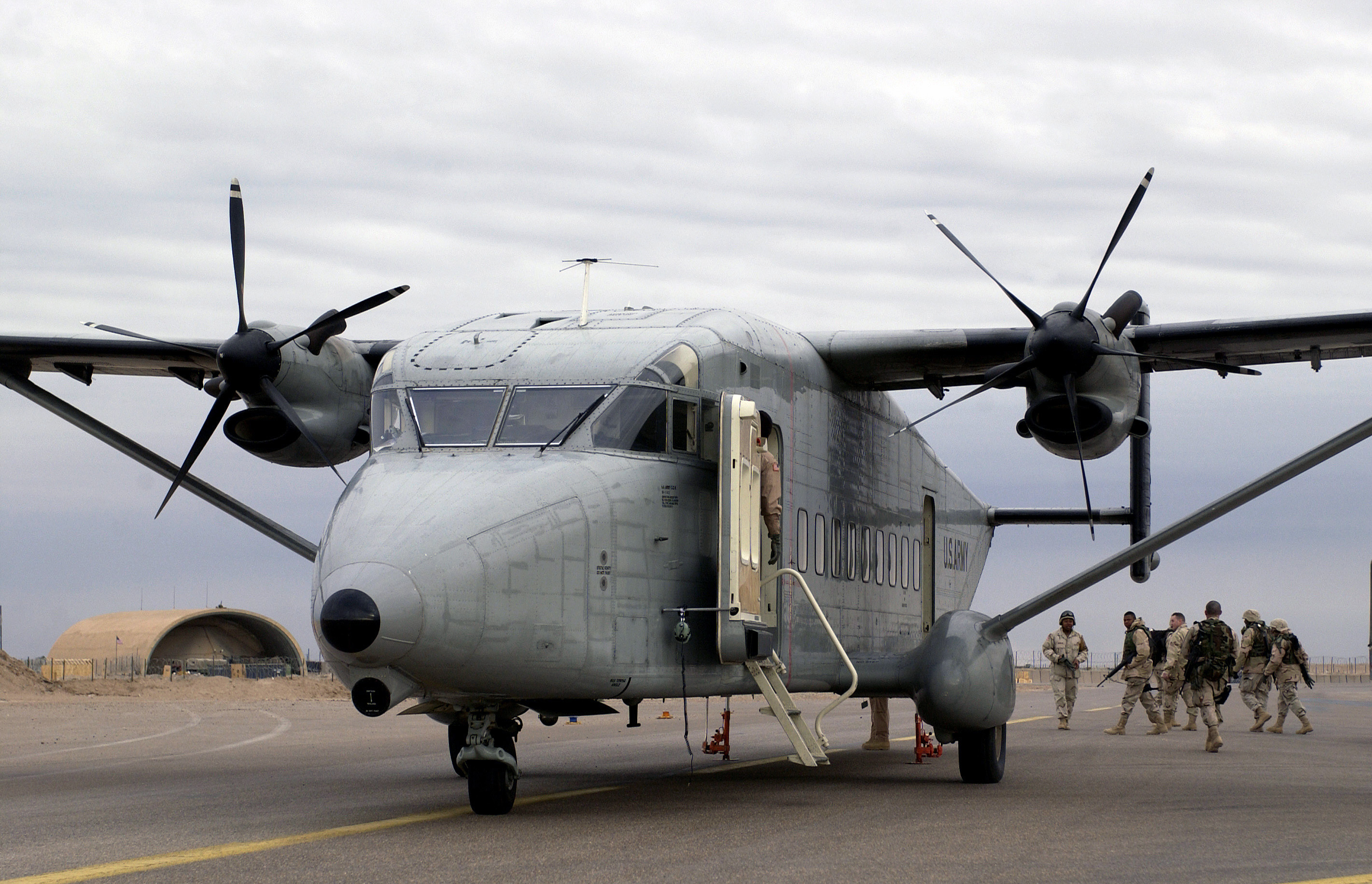
C-23B Sherpa in Iraq, 2004

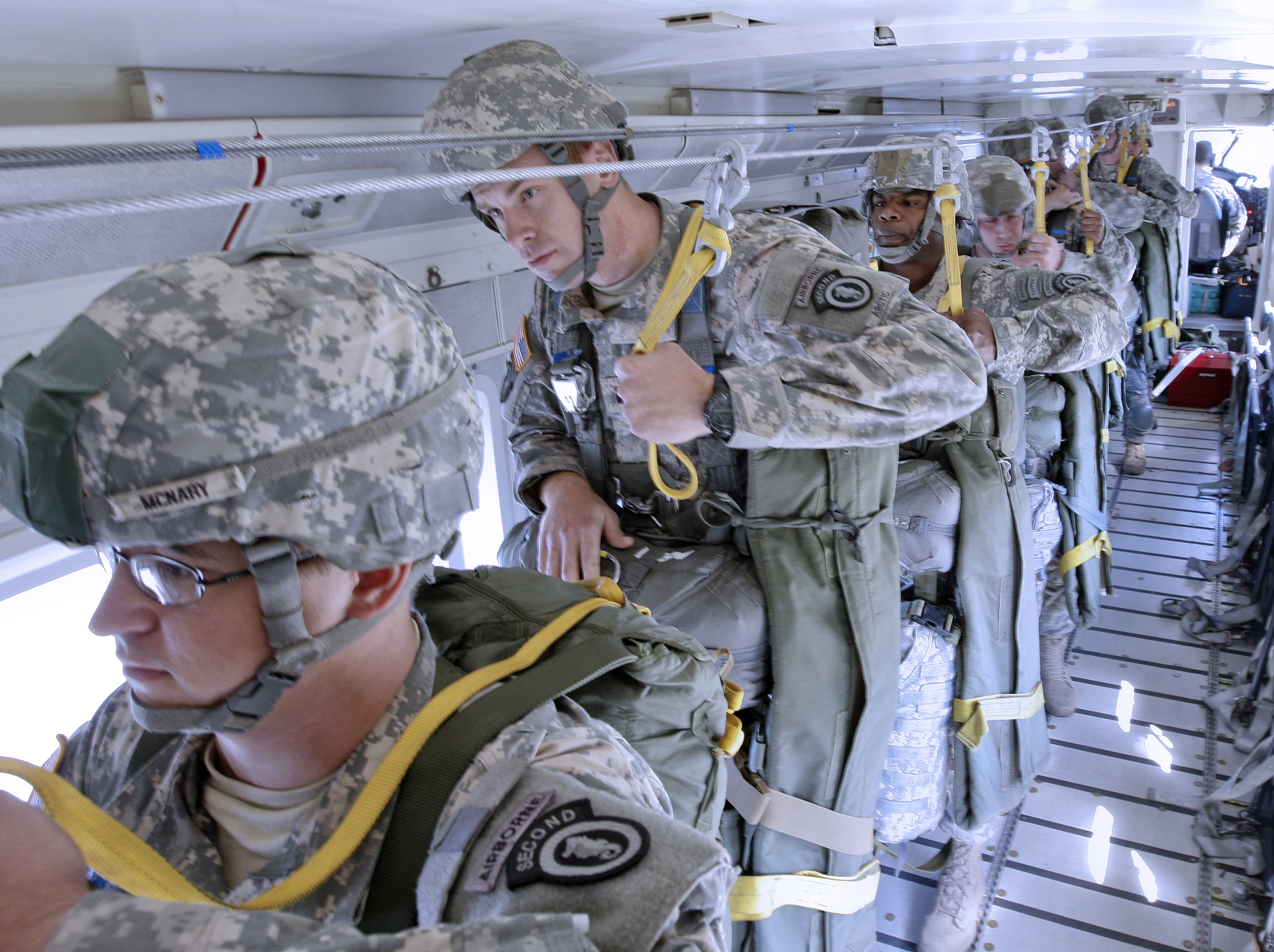
Paratroopers on board a C-23 for training

Philippines

- Philippine Army

Djibouti

- Djibouti Air Force

United States

- United States Air Force
- United States Army
  - Army National Guard
- NASA
- United States Forest Service

=== Civil operators ===
Former USAF and US Army aircraft have been sold to civil operators including:

Philippines

- Royal Star Aviation

United States

- Era Aviation
- Freedom Air
- Richland County Sheriffs Department (South Carolina)
- USDA Forest Service
- Win Aviation

== Aircraft on display ==
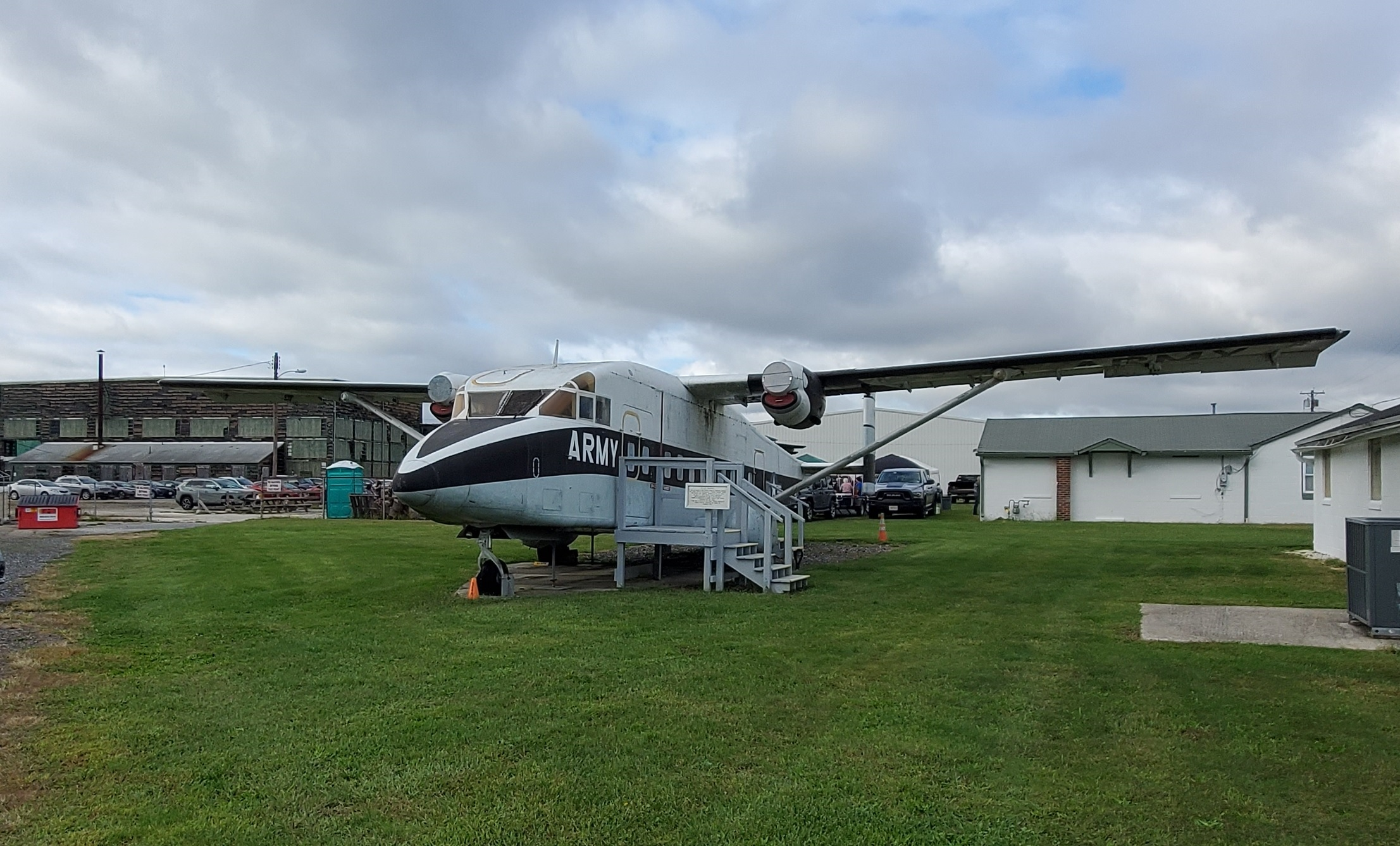
Sherpa 85-25343 on Display at Millville Executive Airport, 2023

United States

- Short 330-200 85-25343, a former Kwajalein range aircraft, at Millville Army Aviation Museum, Millville, New Jersey without its propellers.
- C-23C – N863DZ, which was US Army 93-01320, at Air Heritage Aviation Museum, Beaver Falls, Pennsylvania.

== Specifications (C-23A) ==
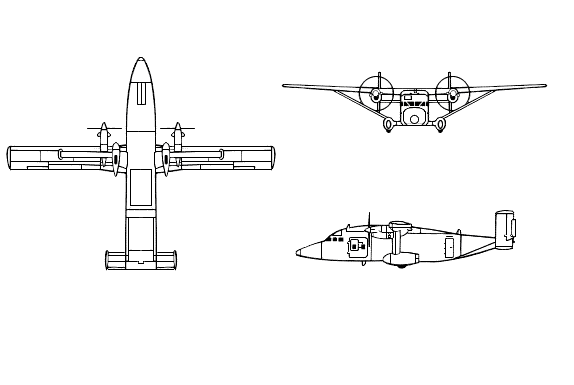
3-view projection of the Short C-23 Sherpa

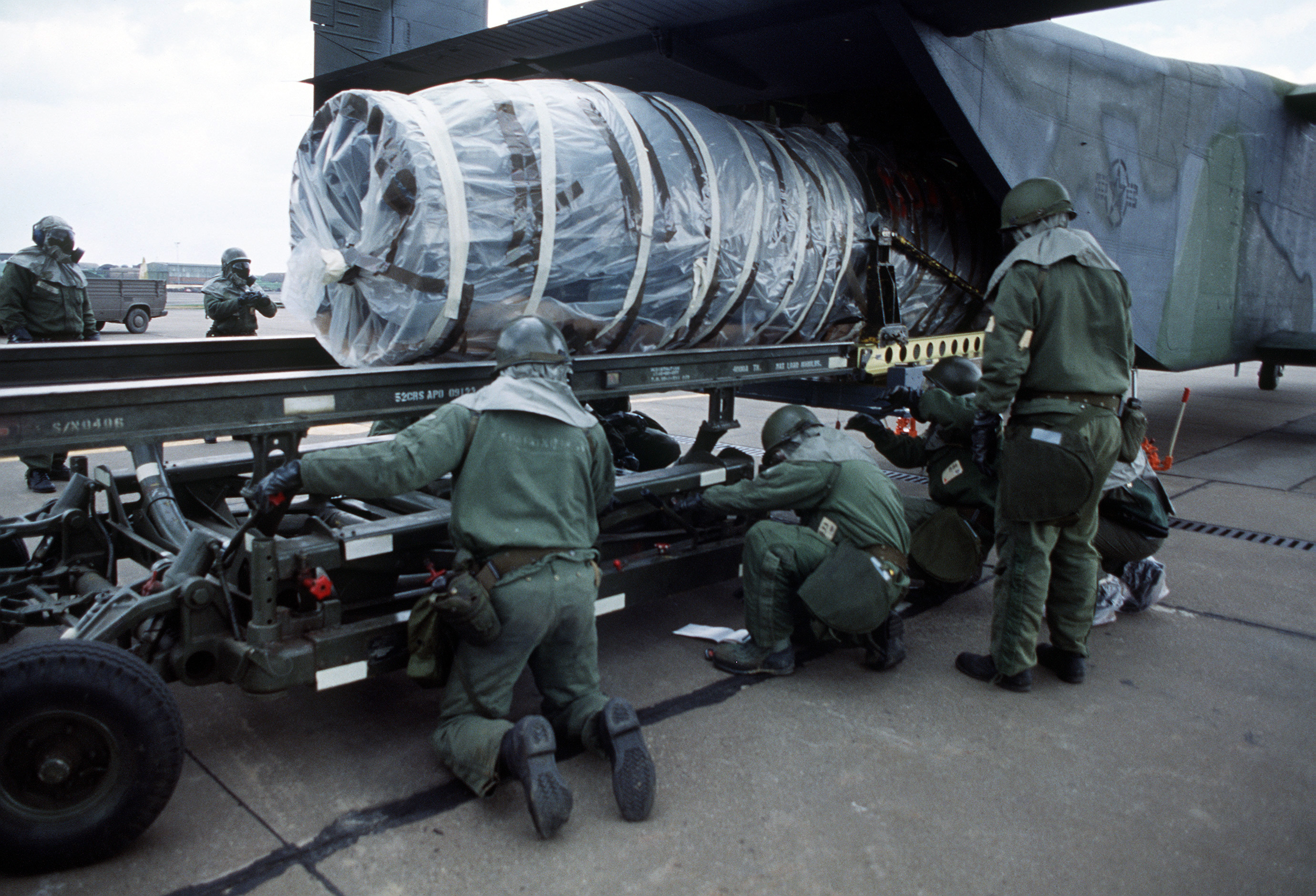
A C-23A with an aircraft engine being unloaded (SALTY DEMO'85)

Unloading pallets of meals, ready to eat (MREs) from a C-23 Sherpa rear cargo door/ramp.

Data from Jane's All the World's Aircraft 1988–1989

General characteristics

- Crew: 3 (2 pilots plus 1 cabin crew)
- Capacity: 30 passengers, or 18 Litter based passengers / 7,000 lb (3,175 kg) maximum payload
- Length: 58 ft 0.5 in (17.691 m)
- Wingspan: 74 ft 8 in (22.76 m)
- Height: 16 ft 3 in (4.95 m)
- Wing area: 453 sq ft (42.1 m^{2})
- Airfoil: root: NACA 63A418; tip: NACA 63A414
- Empty weight: 14,727 lb (6,680 kg) including crew
- Max takeoff weight: 22,900 lb (10,387 kg)
- Maximum landing weight: 22,600 lb (10,251 kg)
- Fuel capacity: 560 imp gal (670 US gal; 2,500 L) / 4,480 lb (2,032 kg)
- Powerplant: 2 × Pratt & Whitney Canada PT6A-45-R turboprop engines, 1,198 shp (893 kW) each
- Propellers: 5-bladed Hartzell, 9 ft 3 in (2.82 m) diameter constant-speed fully-feathering propeller

Performance

- Maximum speed: 252 kn (290 mph, 467 km/h)
- Cruise speed: 228 kn (262 mph, 422 km/h) (Note: 157 kn (181 mph; 291 km/h) at 21,000 lb (9,525 kg) AUW at 10,000 ft (3,048 m))
- Stall speed: 73 kn (84 mph, 135 km/h) at MLW flaps and gear down (Note: 90 kn (104 mph; 167 km/h) flaps and gear up)
- Range: 1,185 nmi (1,364 mi, 2,195 km) with 7,000 lb (3,175 kg) payload, max fuel, reserves for 45 minute hold and 43 nmi (49 mi; 80 km) diversion (Note: 669 nmi (770 mi; 1,239 km) with 5,000 lb (2,268 kg) payload, max fuel, reserves for 45 minute hold and 43 nmi (49 mi; 80 km) diversion)
- Service ceiling: 28,000 ft (8,500 m) one engine inoperative at 21,000 lb (9,525 kg) AUW
- Rate of climb: 1,180 ft/min (6.0 m/s)
- Wing loading: 50.55 lb/sq ft (246.8 kg/m^{2})
- Power/mass: 0.1046 shp/lb (0.1720 kW/kg) maximum
- Take-off run (FAR & BCAR Gp.A): 3,420 ft (1,042 m) ISA
- Take-off run (FAR & BCAR Gp.A): 3,420 ft (1,042 m) ISA + 15 °C (59 °F)
- Landing run at MLW BCAR: 4,020 ft (1,225 m) normal field
- Landing run at MLW BCAR: 3,150 ft (960 m) short field
- Landing run at MLW FAR: 3,650 ft (1,113 m)

== See also ==
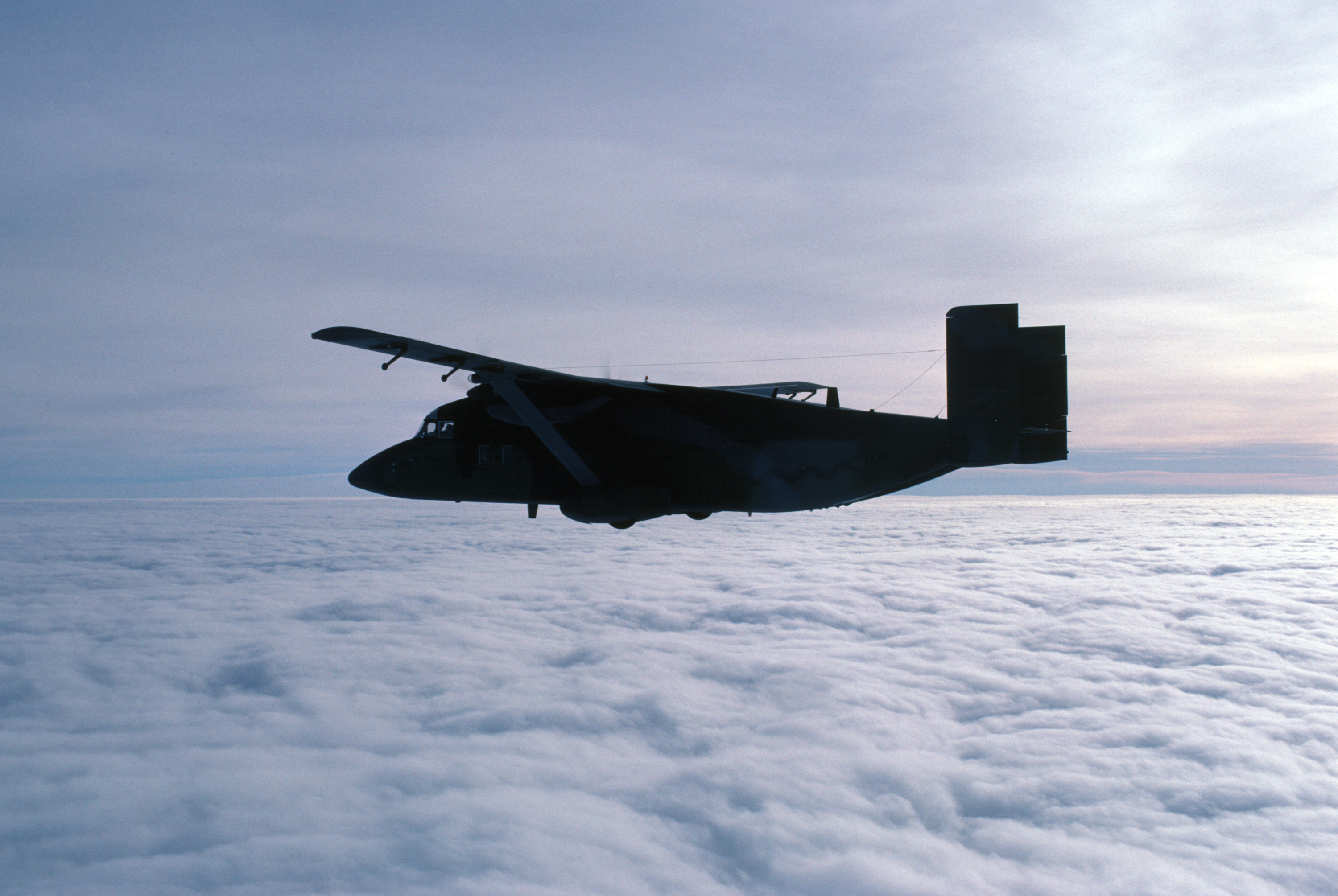
C-23A of the 10th Military Airlift Squadron, October 1987

Related development

- Short 330
- Short 360

Aircraft of comparable role, configuration, and era

- Antonov An-28
- CASA C-212 Aviocar
- DHC-6 Twin Otter
- Dornier 228
- Harbin Y-12
- IAI Arava
- Let L-410 Turbolet
