= Redkite =

RedKite is a lightweight, airborne wide-area motion imagery (WAMI) sensor developed by Logos Technologies, a defense contractor based in Fairfax, Virginia. The system is designed for force protection, border security, disaster response and other missions. Weighing less than 35 pounds, RedKite is equipped with a 50-plus megapixel electro-optical camera and an onboard, eight-hour data processing/storage unit. This allows users to both image a city-sized area as well as conduct analyses of live and recorded imagery in the air, in real time.

The RedKite WAMI system comes in two versions:

- It is either housed in a pod that can be mounted to the hard point of a plane, helicopter, and unmanned aerial vehicle (UAV), or
- It can be integrated directly into the payload bay of a tactical UAV (or U.S. Department of Defense Group 3 unmanned aircraft system). This latter version, which is carried in the payload bay of the Insitu Integrator, is called RedKite-I.

In terms of capability, RedKite resembles systems used by the U.S. military in both Iraq and Afghanistan, such as Constant Hawk and Kestrel Block I, but much lighter than these fielded sensors.

== Development ==
The podded version of the RedKite WAMI sensor was first prototyped by Logos Technologies in May 2014. It weighed 35 pounds and, at the time, lacked processing electronics. Since then, company engineers have been creating lighter, more sophisticated versions of the system that includes on onboard edge-processing unit, which prepares collected data while the platform is still in the air.

In May 2016, the company unveiled a version of the podded RedKite system weighing less than 30 pounds at the Special Operations Forces Industry Conference (SOFIC) in Tampa, Fla. And Logos Technologies has been working on a version weighing nearly 20 pounds for smaller UAVs, or Group 2 unmanned aircraft systems.

== Capabilities ==
When flown 12,000 feet above ground level, RedKite images a 12-square kilometer area in real time and medium resolution—allowing the WAMI system to detect and track multiple, geographically dispersed targets at once. RedKite can also cue a narrow-field, high-resolution video cameras to identify people and vehicles that have been detected. Users on the ground can access up to 10 different video feeds, or “chip-outs,” pulled from the WAMI system's vast field of view and have them displayed in windows on their mobile devices while the system is still in the air.

== Testing ==
The RedKite WAMI system was first tested on manned aircraft: on the Eurocopter AS350 Écureuil, in December 2014, and the Cessna 206 Caravan, in June 2016. However, given its light weight and compact size, RedKite has also been tested on Group 3 unmanned aircraft systems.

The first such test was with the Boeing Insitu Integrator (flown by the U.S. Navy and Marines as the RQ-21 Blackjack) in February 2017, with a follow-on conducted in May. For those demonstrations, RedKite was integrated directly into the payload bay of the Integrator. This version of the WAMI sensor would later be renamed RedKite-I and unveiled as an official product offering for the Integrator at the 2018 Association of the United States Army (AUSA) expo.

The podded version of RedKite was tested on the TigerShark, a NAVMAR Applied Sciences Corporation (NASC) UAV, in June 2017. The five-day demonstration was conducted in Yuma, Arizona, under the auspices of U.S. Naval Air Command.

== Awards ==
In 2018, RedKite won two industry awards: one from Aviation Week (“Defense: Best New Product”) and the other from GSN: Government Security News (“Best City-Wide Video Surveillance”).

== Similar systems ==
Other lightweight (80 pounds or under) WAMI systems include:

- Simera
- Kestrel Block II
- Lightweight Expeditionary Airborne Persistent Surveillance (LEAPS) system

== See also ==
- Wide-area motion imagery
