= David Deptula =

US Air Force officer and academic

David A. Deptula
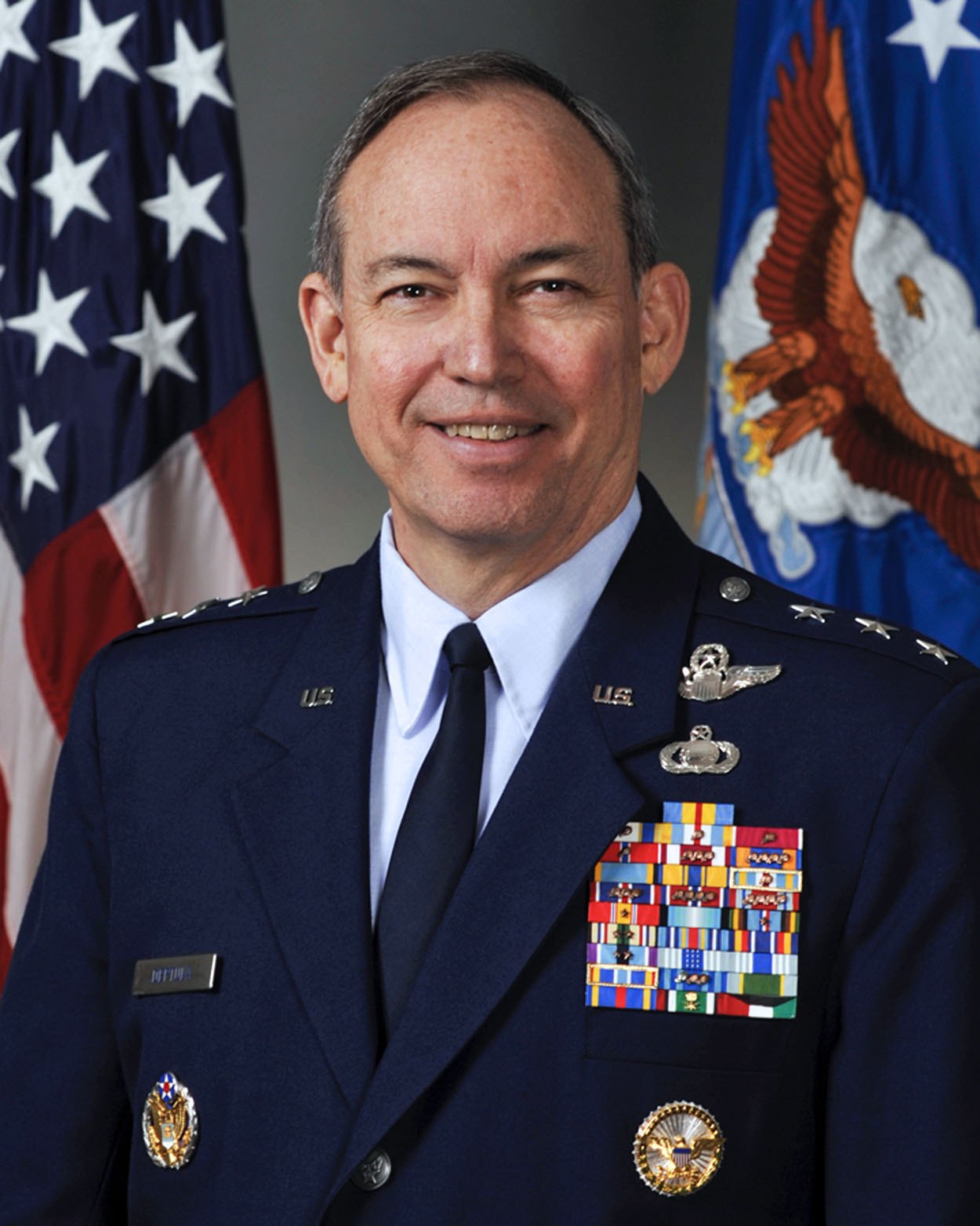
- Born: Dayton, Ohio, U.S.
- Military career
- Allegiance: United States
- Branch: United States Air Force
- Service years: 1976–2010
- Rank: Lieutenant general
- Commands: 33d Operations Group (F-15); C/JTF Commander, Operation Northern Watch; Combined Air Operations Center--Operation Enduring Freedom; Joint Force Air Component Commander--Operation Unified Assistance; Vice Commander Pacific Air Forces; JTF Commander--Operation Deep Freeze; Kenny Warfighting Headquarters (13th Air Force)
- Conflicts: Gulf War; Operation Desert Shield; Operation Desert Storm; Operation Northern Watch; Operation Enduring Freedom; War in Afghanistan; Iraq War; Operation Unified Assistance

David A. Deptula is the dean of the Mitchell Institute for Aerospace Studies, and a senior scholar at the U.S. Air Force Academy's Institute for Future Conflict. He transitioned from the U.S. Air Force in 2010 at the rank of lieutenant general after more than 34 years of service. Deptula was commissioned in 1974 as a distinguished graduate from The University of Virginia Air Force ROTC program, and remained to complete a master's degree in 1976. During his military career he took part in operations, planning, and joint warfighting at unit, major command, service headquarters and combatant command levels, and also served on two congressional commissions outlining America's future defense posture. He was a principal author of the original Air Force White Paper "Global Reach—Global Power". In the early 1990s he was instrumental in the formation and development of the concept later known as "effects-based operations", having successfully applied it in building the attack plans for the Operation Desert Storm air campaign. He has been cited as having "... fostered the most significant change in the conduct of aerial warfare since Billy Mitchell...Deptula’s framework influenced the successful air campaigns in Operations Allied Force, Iraqi Freedom, and Enduring Freedom. Today, joint targeting cells and Air Force doctrine reflect Deptula's theory of airpower and the changing nature of warfare." Deptula is one of 12 airmen singled out in Airpower Pioneers: From Billy Mitchell to Dave Deptula. He is also the subject of a more detailed review of his contributions to the development of airpower in America's Airman: David Deptula and the Airpower Moment.

== Early life and education ==
Deptula attended Fairfax High School in Fairfax, Virginia, graduating in 1969. In 1974, he earned a Bachelor of Science degree in astronomy from the University of Virginia. In 1976 he earned a Master of Science degree in systems engineering from the University of Virginia. In 1978 he graduated from the USAF Squadron Officer School and in 1981 he graduated from the U.S. Air Force Fighter Weapons School. In 1983, he graduated from the Air Command and Staff College. In 1988 he graduated from the Armed Forces Staff College in Norfolk, Virginia. In 1994 he earned a Master of Science degree in national security strategy from the National War College at Fort Lesley J. McNair in Washington, D.C.

== Career ==
Deptula began his USAF career as a pilot earning his wings in 1977. Upon graduation, he was assigned an F-15C air superiority fighter, and went on to serve in fighter squadrons in a variety of roles to include duty as an F-15 aerial demonstration pilot. He attended the USAF Fighter Weapons School, and became a squadron, and then wing weapons officer. His first staff assignment was in USAF Legislative Liaison. The remainder of his career he spent alternating between operational assignments commanding fighter units and in joint operations, with staff assignments at Headquarters USAF, Major Air Force Commands, and with the Office of the Secretary of Defense. Notable assignments included: Policy and issues analyst, Secretary of the Air Force Policy Group; Principal offensive air campaign planner for Operation Desert Shield, and director, Iraq Target Planning Group, Operation Desert Storm; Commander, Combined/Joint Task Force for Operation Northern Watch (ONW), U.S. European Command; Director, 2001 Air Force Quadrennial Defense Review (QDR); Director, Combined Air Operations Center (CAOC), Operation Enduring Freedom (OEF) 2001; Commander of the General George C. Kenney Warfighting Headquarters, and Vice Commander, Pacific Air Forces; Joint Force Air Component Commander (JFACC)—Operation Unified Assistance—the South Asia tsunami relief effort; and Deputy Chief of Staff (DCS) for Intelligence, Surveillance and Reconnaissance (ISR), Headquarters USAF. An editorial on the impact of his military career appeared in the Air Force Times on August 2, 2010, and a more complete accounting of his military career can be found in Airpower Pioneers: From Billy Mitchell to Dave Deptula.

=== Leadership in combat and contingency operations ===
Deptula has experience in combat and leadership in several major joint contingency operations. He was the principal attack planner for the Desert Storm coalition air campaign in 1991. He has twice been a Combined/Joint Task Force Commander – in 1998/1999 for the Operation Northern Watch no-fly zone where he flew 82 combat missions as a general officer, and for Operation Deep Freeze in Antarctica. In 2001, he was director of the Combined Air Operations Center for Operation Enduring Freedom where he orchestrated air operations over Afghanistan in response to the terrorist attacks of September 11, 2001. In 2005, he was the Joint Force Air Component Commander (JFACC) for Operation Unified Assistance, the South Asia tsunami relief effort, and in 2006 he was the standing JFACC for Pacific Command. He has piloted more than 3,000 flying hours (400 in combat), including multiple fighter aircraft command assignments in the F-15.

=== Intelligence, surveillance, reconnaissance, and drone leadership ===
Deptula was the first Deputy Chief of Staff for Intelligence, Surveillance and Reconnaissance at Air Force Headquarters, and was involved in shaping and managing military use of unmanned aerial vehicles. Responsible for policy formulation, planning, and leadership of AF ISR and remotely piloted aircraft (RPA)—also known as drones—he initiated and built the Air Force's first ISR Strategy, established the Air Force ISR Agency, and constructed an Air Force ISR flight plan that established processes to optimize ISR decisions to resource that strategy. He published the first USAF RPA/drone flight plan that together with the ISR strategy formed an ISR enterprise intended to transition the military from an era of industrial age warfare to the information age.

== Post-military career ==
Deptula's post-military retirement life involves research, education, and advocacy on matters relating to national security. He has served as a senior scholar at the U.S. Air Force Academy Center for Character and Leadership Development, as well as in the Institute for Future Conflict, on the Defense Science Board task force on innovation for the future; participated in the crafting of "A New Defense Strategy for a New Era" as a member of the Peter G. Peterson Foundation Defense Advisory Committee; as a senior adviser to the Gemunder Center for Defense & Strategy; and as an adviser to the NATO Joint Air Power Competence Center future vector project. He has been a speaker at events hosted by the USAF; the Air & Space Forces Association; the Council on Foreign Relations; the Center for Strategic and Budgetary Affairs; the Center for a New American Security; the Center for Strategic and International Studies; Congressional Staff; the Jewish Institute for National Security Affairs; The National Security Roundtable; the Bipartisan Policy Center; the U.S. Peace Institute; several universities; international security events, and testified multiple times to Congress as a defense expert.

As the inaugural holder of the position of dean of the Mitchell Institute for Aerospace Studies initiated in 2013, Lt Gen Deptula, (Ret.) built the institute into an “aerospace power think tank.” The institute hosts a growing number of video forums with senior aerospace defense leadership known as the Aerospace Nation series as well as research and policy papers and a podcast series. Deptula established both a Space Power Advantage Center of Excellence in 2021 and a Center for Uninhabited Aerial Vehicle (UAV) and Autonomy Studies in 2022 inside the Mitchell Institute to focus on emerging technologies, concepts, and capabilities.

In addition to his primary occupation as the dean of the Mitchell Institute for Aerospace Studies, Deptula is a board member at a variety of institutions; an independent consultant; and is a commentator around the world on military issues; strategy; and ISR. He has appeared in numerous publications, on national and international television and radio, and authored articles in public, and professional magazines, journals, and books (see publications list below). Defense News magazine named Deptula one of the 100 most influential people in U.S. defense for 2014.

In 2014, Deptula was barred from conducting business with the government for over a year after attempting to prevent the cancellation of the TCOM Blue Devil project. (Deptula was then the CEO of MAV 6, the company responsible for building the Blue Devil.)

== Assignments ==
- February 1976 – January 1977, student, undergraduate pilot training, Vance AFB, Oklahoma
- February 1977 – December 1977, student, F-15 upgrade training, Luke AFB, Arizona
- January 1978 – September 1979, F-15 flight lead, 7th Tactical Fighter Squadron, and wing training officer, 49th Tactical Fighter Wing, Holloman AFB, New Mexico
- September 1979 – January 1983, F-15 flight commander, weapons and tactics officer, mission commander, instructor pilot and Pacific Air Forces F-15 aerial demonstration pilot, 67th Tactical Fighter Squadron, Kadena Air Base, Japan
- January 1983 – February 1984, staff officer, Air Staff Training Program, Weapons Systems Division, Office of the Secretary of the Air Force for Legislative Liaison, Washington, D.C.
- February 1984 – April 1984, student, F-15 requalification training, Luke AFB, Arizona
- April 1984 – July 1987, chief, Wing Weapons and Tactics Division, and instructor pilot, 325th Tactical Training Wing, Tyndall AFB, Florida
- July 1987 – January 1988, student, Armed Forces Staff College, Norfolk, Virginia
- January 1988 – September 1989, action officer, Directorate of Warfighting Concepts Development, Doctrine Division, Headquarters U.S. Air Force, Washington, D.C.
- September 1989 – January 1992, policy and issues analyst, and Secretary of the Air Force Policy Group member, Office of the Secretary of the Air Force, Washington, D.C. (August 1990 – March 1991, principal offensive air campaign planner for the Director of Campaign Plans, Operation Desert Shield, and director, Iraq Target Planning Group, Operation Desert Storm, Joint Force Air Component Command, Riyadh, Saudi Arabia)
- February 1992 – March 1992, student, F-15 requalification training, Tyndall AFB, Florida
- March 1992 – July 1993, Chief of Wing Safety, and Team Chief and lead pilot for William Tell 1992, 33rd Fighter Wing; later, deputy commander of 33rd Logistics Group, Eglin AFB, Florida
- August 1993 – June 1994, student, National War College, Fort Lesley J. McNair, Washington, D.C.
- May 1994 – August 1995, team leader, Joint Warfighting and Deep Attack Issues, and professional staff member, Commission on Roles and Missions of the Armed Forces, Office of the Secretary of Defense, Washington, D.C.
- August 1995 – September 1995, student, F-15 requalification training, Tyndall AFB, Florida
- October 1995 – December 1996, commander, 33rd Operations Group, Eglin AFB, Florida
- January 1997 – January 1998, senior Air Force representative, National Defense Panel, Office of the Secretary of Defense, Washington, D.C.
- February 1998 – March 1998, student, F-15 requalification training, Tyndall AFB, Florida
- April 1998 – October 1999, commander, Combined Task Force for Operation Northern Watch, U.S. European Command, Incirlik Air Base, Turkey
- October 1999 – February 2000, Director for Expeditionary Aerospace Force Implementation, Deputy Chief of Staff for Air and Space Operations, Headquarters U.S. Air Force, Washington, D.C.
- February 2000 – December 2001, director, Air Force Quadrennial Defense Review, Headquarters U.S. Air Force, Washington, D.C. (September 2001 – November 2001, Director, Combined Air Operations Center, Operation Enduring Freedom)
- December 2001 – October 2003, director of plans and programs, Headquarters Air Combat Command, Langley AFB, Virginia
- November 2003 – August 2005, Director of Air and Space Operations, Headquarters Pacific Air Forces, Hickam AFB, Hawaii
- September 2005 – July 2006, Commander of the General George C. Kenney Warfighting Headquarters (P), and Vice Commander, Pacific Air Forces, Hickam AFB, Hawaii
- July 2006 – October 2010, Deputy Chief of Staff for Intelligence, Surveillance and Reconnaissance, Headquarters U.S. Air Force, Washington, D.C.

== Joint assignments ==
- August 1990 – March 1991, principal air campaign planner, Operation Desert Shield, and director, Iraq Target Planning Group, Operation Desert Storm, Joint Force Air Component Command, Saudi Arabia, as a lieutenant colonel
- May 1994 – August 1995, team leader-Joint Warfighting Issues, and professional staff member, Commission on Roles and Missions of the Armed Forces, Office of the Secretary of Defense, Washington, D.C., as a colonel
- January 1997 – January 1998, National Defense Panel staff member, Office of the Secretary of Defense, Washington, D.C., as a colonel
- April 1998 – October 1999, commander, Combined/Joint Task Force Operation Northern Watch, U.S. European Command, Incirlik AB, Turkey, as a brigadier general
- September 2001 – November 2001, director, Combined Air Operations Center, Operation Enduring Freedom, Saudi Arabia, as a major general
- December 2004 – February 2005, Joint Force Air Component Commander, Operation Unified Assistance (South Asia tsunami relief effort), Hickam AFB, Hawaii, as a major general
- October 2005 – July 2006, commander, Joint Task Force Operation Deep Freeze, and standing Joint Force Air Component Commander for Pacific Command, Hickam AFB, Hawaii, as a lieutenant general

== Flight information ==
- Rating: Command pilot
- Flight hours: More than 3,000, including more than 400 combat hours
- Aircraft flown: T-37, T-38 and F-15A/B/C/D

== Awards and decorations ==
Personal decorations
	Defense Distinguished Service Medal
	Air Force Distinguished Service Medal (with two bronze oak leaf clusters)
	Defense Superior Service Medal (with bronze oak leaf cluster)
Width-44 crimson ribbon with a pair of width-2 white stripes on the edges	Legion of Merit (with bronze oak leaf cluster)
	Bronze Star Medal (with bronze oak leaf cluster)
	Meritorious Service Medal (with three bronze oak leaf clusters)
	Air Medal (with four bronze oak leaf clusters)
	Aerial Achievement Medal
	Air Force Commendation Medal
Unit awards
	Joint Meritorious Unit Award (with bronze oak leaf cluster)
	Air Force Outstanding Unit Award (with three bronze oak leaf clusters)
	Air Force Organizational Excellence Award (with four bronze oak leaf clusters)
Service Awards
	Combat Readiness Medal (with four bronze oak leaf clusters)
Campaign and service medals
	National Defense Service Medal (with bronze service star)
	Antarctica Service Medal
	Armed Forces Expeditionary Medal (with bronze service star)
	Southwest Asia Service Medal (with two bronze service stars)
	Global War on Terrorism Expeditionary Medal
	Global War on Terrorism Service Medal
	Humanitarian Service Medal (with two bronze service stars)
Service, training, and marksmanship awards
	Air Force Overseas Short Tour Service Ribbon
	Air Force Overseas Long Tour Service Ribbon
	Air Force Expeditionary Service Ribbon
	Air Force Longevity Service Award (with one silver and two bronze oak leaf clusters)
	Small Arms Expert Marksmanship Ribbon
	Air Force Training Ribbon
Foreign awards
	Kuwait Liberation Medal (Saudi Arabia)
	Kuwait Liberation Medal (Kuwait)

Other accoutrements
Command Air Force Pilot Badge
Office of the Secretary of Defense Identification Badge
Headquarters Air Force Badge

== Effective dates of promotion ==
Rank	Date
Second lieutenant	February 4, 1976
First lieutenant	June 5, 1977
Captain	June 5, 1979
Major	May 1, 1986
Lieutenant colonel	April 1, 1990
Colonel	February 1, 1994
Brigadier general	September 1, 1999
Major general	June 1, 2002
Lieutenant general	October 1, 2005

== Publications ==
- "MAKING JOINT ALL DOMAIN COMMAND AND CONTROL A REALITY," War on the Rocks, December 9, 2022
- "The B-21 Will Reestablish The U.S. Power Projection Edge—If Bought In Needed Quantities," November 30, 2022
- "Move Ukraine Beyond Stalemate By Supplying Combat Aircraft," FORBES, November 27, 2022
- "U.S. Cuts Pacific Airpower Presence As China’s Military Grows," FORBES, November 1, 2022
- "Missing The Target: Leadership Actions On Drones Put Lives At Risk And Undermine U.S. Security," FORBES, October 7, 2022
- "In a Dangerous World, New Pentagon Mitigation Plan Would Hobble U.S. Forces," Defense Opinion, September 13, 2022
- "Decades of Air Force Underfunding Threaten America’s Ability to Win," Mitchell Institute Policy Paper, Vol 37, September 12, 2022
- "Provide The Airpower Ukraine Needs To Win Now," FORBES, July 25, 2022
- "The Proposed 2023 Defense Budget Doesn’t Meet U.S. Security Goals," FORBES, June 9, 2022
- "The Space Force Requires A Space National Guard," FORBES, May 31, 2022
- "Is America’s military headed down the same path as Russia’s?" Defense News, May 17, 2022
- "World Events Demand Congress Reset Administration F-35 Cuts," FORBES, March 31, 2022
- "The U.S. Should Equip Ukraine With Larger Armed Drones Like The Reaper," FORBES, March 16, 2022
- "Get additional MiG-29s to Ukraine now," THE HILL, March 14, 2022
- "The Biggest Threat To U.S. National Security Today Is The U.S. Congress," FORBES, February 10, 2022
- "A New Battle Command Architecture For Joint All-Domain Operations," Aether: A Journal of Strategic Airpower & Spacepower, 2022
- "Core Values and the Air Force," THE JOURNAL OF CHARACTER & LEADERSHIP DEVELOPMENT, Fall 2021
- "Veterans Day 2021," FORBES, November 11, 2021
- "Time To Start Fielding Tomorrow’s Airpower Capabilities Today," FORBES, November 4, 2021
- "Reviving A “Weak” Department Of The Air Force," FORBES, October 25, 2021
- "America’s drone programs matter today more than ever," THE HILL, October 11, 2021
- "It’s Time To Reassess How We Manage The Defense Industrial Base," FORBES, September 16, 2021
- "On Its Birthday, The Air Force Needs To Fight For What It Deserves," Breaking Defense, September 20, 2021
- "Great Power Competition Demands Smart Industrial Policy," FORBES, July 23, 2021
- "Commemoration of the 100th Anniversary of Brigadier General Billy Mitchell’s Sinking of the Battleship Ostfriesland," Mitchell Institute Forum Paper, Number 41, July 21, 2021
- "Speed is Life: Accelerating the Air Force’s Ability to Adapt and Win," Mitchell Institute Policy Paper, Vol 28, July 20, 2021
- "Misleading Budget Accounting In The Department Of Defense Needs Correction," FORBES, July 6, 2021
- "Securing America’s Interests Over Afghanistan," FORBES, Jun 23, 2021
- "Building an Agile Force: The Imperative for Speed and Adaptation in the U.S. Aerospace Industrial Base," Mitchell Institute Study, May 18, 2021
- "Welcome To The Air Force, Mr. Kendall: Here Are 5 Top Action Items," FORBES, May 3, 2021
- "Interview with Air Force Global Strike Command boss Gen. Timothy M. Ray," Air & Space Forces Magazine, April 23, 2021
- "F-35 Hitmen Put U.S. And Partner Lives At Risk," FORBES, March 29, 2021
- "DESERT STORM AT 30: AEROSPACE POWER AND THE U.S. MILITARY," War on the Rocks, March 1, 2021
- "Aerospace Vectors for the Incoming Biden Defense Team," Mitchell Institute Policy Paper, Vol 25, February 2021
- "Air Force: Don’t Buy Old Combat Aircraft," FORBES, January 28, 2021
- "#DesertStorm30 – Planning and Executing the Air Campaign," Balloons to Drones, January 21, 2021
- "Desert Storm: 30 Years Later," A Special Report by the Mitchell Institute for Aerospace Studies, January 17, 2021
- "Five Persistent Misconceptions About Modernizing The U.S. ICBM Force," FORBES, December 22, 2020
- "Pentagon Needs More Balanced Representation In Joint Service Leadership," FORBES, December 14, 2020
- "Keep U.S. Space Command Where It Is," FORBES, November 18, 2020
- "A Better Way to Measure Combat Value," Air & Space Forces Magazine, September 1, 2020
- "Let the Space Force define its own ranks," The Hill, August 16, 2020
- "A sitting target in space for Russia’s anti-satellite weapons?" The Hill, August 5, 2020
- "Combatant Commanders Want Reaper To Stay," Breaking Defense, July 22, 2020
- "F-35 Is Performing Far Better Than Critics Would Have You Think," FORBES, July 20, 2020
- "U.S. Must Invest More In Its Geriatric Bomber Force," FORBES, July 13, 2020
- "Moving further into the information age with Joint All-Domain Command and Control," C4ISRNET, July 9, 2020
- "Resolving America’s Defense Strategy-Resource Mismatch: The Case for Cost-Per-Effect Analysis," Mitchell Institute Policy Paper, Vol 23, July 8, 2020
- "Anachronistic Export Policy Is Damaging The U.S. Drone Industry And National Security," FORBES, June 9, 2020
- "Setting Up The Space Force For Success," FORBES, May 18, 2020
- "Two Years and Counting – Next Moves to Curb Iran’s Nuclear Aspirations," The American Spectator, May 13, 2020
- "A Smart Approach To Retaining Most Of The A-10s," Breaking Defense, May 4, 2020
- "No, Elon Musk: The Era Of The Manned Fighter Jet Won’t Be Over Anytime Soon," FORBES, March 2, 2020
- "The Opportunity Exists To Move Faster On Nuclear Modernization," FORBES, February 14, 2020
- "The 2021 Defense Budget Won’t Meet U.S. Strategic Goals. Here’s How We Can Adapt," FORBES, February 12, 2020
- "War With Iran Could Be Sharp & Short With Fifth Gen Aircraft: Deptula," Breaking Defense, January 23, 2020
- "T o Deter War With Iran, U.S. Should Use Its Asymmetric Edge: Air Power," FORBES, January 6, 2020
- "Securing the Pacific Skies: The Imperative for Expanding Japan’s Fifth-Generation Capacity," Mitchell Institute Study, December 1, 2019
- "Why The U.S. Needs To Invest More In Bombers," FORBES, November 20, 2019
- "Keep History Flying: Warbirds In The Wake Of The B-17 Crash," FORBES, October 5, 2019
- "Restoring America’s Military Competitiveness: Mosaic Warfare," Mitchell Institute Study, September 11, 2019
- "Maritime Strike," Air & Space Forces Magazine, September 1, 2019
- "Boeing's Exit From ICBM Bid Shouldn't Become Another Excuse To Delay Modernizing U.S. Nuclear Deterrent," FORBES, July 26, 2019
- "The Invisible Anniversary Of The B-2 Bomber," FORBES, July 17, 2019
- "What Is The Next U.S. Move With Iran?" FORBES, June 25, 2019
- "A Department Of Defense Leadership Crisis?" FORBES, June 19, 2019
- "A Space Force That Would Make A Difference," FORBES, May 5, 2019
- "Ensuring the Common Defense: The Case for Fifth Generation Airpower," Mitchell Institute Policy Paper, Vol 20, April 18, 2019
- "Yes To A U.S. Space Command But No To A Separate Space Force," FORBES, April 10, 2019
- "The Air Force Wants More F-35s In FY 2020: Congress Needs To Step In," FORBES, March 26, 2019
- "The Force We Need: Key Factors for Shaping the Air Force for the Future," Mitchell Institute Policy Paper, Vol 19, March 6, 2019
- "The Perils Of JEDI: A Single Cloud Provider For The Pentagon And CIA Could Spell Disaster," FORBES, February 27, 2019
- "What Trump Needs To Keep In Mind In His Summit With North Korea's Kim Jong Un," FORBES, February 26, 2019
- "The Japanese Air Force Needs an Upgrade," Foreign Policy, March 18, 2019
- "Bombers for Maritime Strike: An Asymmetric Counter to China’s Navy," Mitchell Institute Policy Paper, Vol 18, February 27, 2019
- "Modernizing U.S. Nuclear Command, Control, and Communications," Mitchell Institute Study, February 14, 2019
- "Building The Air Force We Need To Meet Chinese And Russian Threats," FORBES, February 11, 2019
- "Twenty-First Century Air Power: Future Challenges and Opportunities," RAF Airpower Review, Winter 2018
- "Pegasus arrives: KC-46 tanker makes America more effective in era of growing threats," Defense News, January 16, 2019
- "U.S. Strategy For Syria Should Emphasize Air Power," FORBES, January 10, 2018
- "The 2020 Defense Budget -- Risk Trumps Security," FORBES, November 26, 2018
- "Whether The U.S. Scraps The INF Or Stays In, China Must Be Checked," FORBES, November 5, 2018
- "To Improve U.S. Air Combat Readiness, End The Budget Control Act," FORBES, October 25, 2018
- "The Growing Importance Of Data Rights In Defense Acquisition," FORBES, October 19, 2018
- "Hypersonic Weapons Could Transform Warfare. The U.S. Is Behind," FORBES, October 5, 2018
- "Building the Future Bomber Force America Needs: The Bomber Re-Vector," Mitchell Institute Study, September 20, 2018
- "Organizing Spacepower: Conditions for Creating a US Space Force," Mitchell Institute Policy Paper, Vol 16, August 8, 2018
- "Manned-Unmanned Aircraft Teaming: Taking Combat Airpower to the Next Level," Mitchell Institute Policy Paper, Vol 15, July 10, 2018
- "SecAF Wilson Takes Charge, Calls For 24% Boost In Squadrons," Breaking Defense, June 22, 2018
- "Space Force: Go Slow, Learn From Army Air Corps," Breaking Defense, June 22, 2018
- "The St. Andrews Proclamation: A Pragmatic Assessment of 21st Century Airpower," Mitchell Institute Policy Paper, Vol 12, June 12, 2018
- "Trump North Korea summit reveals exactly why it is vital to rebuild the US military," Fox News Opinion, June 11, 2018
- "Interdependent Warfare: Combined Effects Power in the 21st Century," Mitchell Institute Policy Paper, Vol 10, March 23, 2018
- "Policy Roundtable: What to Make of Trump’s National Security Strategy," Texas National Security Review, December 21, 2017
- "Stealthy New Nuclear Cruise Missile Aims to Deter the Enemy," Cipher Brief, August 8, 2017
- "America’s Air Superiority Crisis," Breaking Defense, July 12, 2017
- "Create Executive Agent For Drones: AFA’s Mitchell Institute," Breaking Defense, June 28, 2017
- "Consolidating the Revolution: Optimizing the Potential of Remotely Piloted Aircraft," Mitchell Institute Study, June 28, 2017
- "Congress, Military Are Running Out of Time," Breaking Defense, April 13, 2017
- "DESERT STORM: 25 YEARS LATER Lessons from the 1991 Air Campaign in the Persian Gulf War," A Special Report by the Mitchell Institute for Aerospace Studies, March 1, 2017
- "Long-Range Strike: ‘More Potent,’ More Survivable & Cheaper," Breaking Defense, January 31, 2017
- "Mr. Trump: We Need F-35s Built Faster, Not Fewer," Breaking Defense, December 13, 2016
- "State’s New Armed Drone Policy Confuses Ends With Means," Breaking Defense, October 11, 2016
- "Evolving Technologies and Warfare in the 21st Century: Introducing the Combat Cloud," Mitchell Institute Policy Paper, Vol 4, September 16, 2016
- "Beyond JSTARS: Rethinking the Combined Airborne Battle Management and Ground Surveillance Mission," Mitchell Institute Policy Paper, Vol 2, September 6, 2016
- "Just Warfare Entails Risk; Movie ‘Eye In The Sky’ Perverts Just War Laws," Breaking Defense, May 16, 2016
- "Army Never Outgunned If Joint Force Can Help," Breaking Defense, April 8, 2016
- "Sen. McCain: Keep the B-21 On Track," Breaking Defense, March 18, 2016
- "Beyond Goldwater-Nichols: Roles And Missions Of The Armed Services In The 21st Century," Mitchell Institute Policy Paper, Vol 1, March 1, 2016
- "How Desert Storm Changed War; What Obama Can Change To Defeat ISIL," Breaking Defense, January 20, 2016
- "How to Defeat the Islamic State," The Washington Post, 5 Jun 2015
- "Intelligence, Surveillance and Reconnaissance in the Information Age," Leading Edge—Airpower in Theory & Practice, 9 Jun 2015
- "Airmindedness," Leading Edge—Airpower in Theory & Practice, 1 May 2015
- "The Russians Have Us Over A Rocket," Wall Street Journal, 23 Oct 2014
- "How To Defeat ISIL: It’s All About The Strategy," Breaking Defense, 5 Sep 2014
- "A New Era for Command and Control of Aerospace Operations," Air & Space Power Journal, Jul-Aug 2014
- "A Reinvigorated Beacon of Aerospace Advocacy," Wingman Magazine, May 2014
- "Sending a Bunker-Buster Message to Iran," Wall Street Journal, 7 Apr 2014
- "Toward A Balanced Combat Air Force," CSBA, Mar 2014
- "Drones Best Weapons We've Got For Accuracy, Control, Oversight," AOL Defense, Mar 2013
- "New Capabilities, New Constraints Call For New Concepts," AOL Defense, Jan 2013
- "Missing From Our Two Wars: Clear Goals, Joint Forces," in AOL Defense, Oct 2012
- "Afghan War Lessons: U.S. Must Make Strategic Choices As Budgets Shrink," AOL Defense, Oct 2011"Integration Nation," C4ISR Journal, Apr 2012
- "ISR Will Lead the Fight by 2020," AOL Defense, Jun 2011
- "The Future of Air Power," in Global Air Power, 2011
- "Information-age Warfare Demands New Approaches to ISR," Armed Forces Journal International, Nov 2010
- "Global Distributed ISR Operations: The Changing Face of Warfare," Joint Forces Quarterly 54, 2009
- "A House Divided: The Indivisibility of ISR," Air & Space Power, Summer 2008
- Deptula, David A. (April 2008). "Unmanned Aircraft Systems Taking Strategy to Task". JFQ: Joint Force Quarterly. No. 49. p. 49.
- Deptula, David A. (January 2008). "Air and Space Power, Lead Turning, the Future". Orbis. 52 (4): 585–594. doi:10.1016/j.orbis.2008.07.010.
- "Toward Restructuring National Security," Strategic Studies Quarterly Vol 1, No. 2, 2007
- "Transforming Air and Space Power Organization in the Pacific," High Frontier Magazine, 2006
- "Direct Attack: Enhancing Counterland Doctrine & Jnt Air-Ground Operations," Air & Space Power Journal, Winter 2003
- "Transforming Joint Air-Ground Operations for 21st Century Battlespace," Field Artillery Mag, Jul-Aug 2003
- "Embracing Change: US Air Force Transformation," Armed Forces Journal International, October 2001
- "Effects-based Operations: Change in the Nature of War," Aerospace Education Foundation, 2001
- "Air Exclusion Zones: Instruments of Security Policy in a New Era," RAAF Proceedings, 2000
- "Parallel Warfare—What is it? Where did it come from? Why Is It Important?" Eagle in the Desert, 1996
- "Firing for Effect: Change in the Nature of Warfare," AFA Defense and Airpower Series, 1995
