= Engineering and the Mind's Eye =

Book

- Author: Eugene S. Ferguson
- Language: English
- Genre: Non-fiction
- Publisher: MIT Press
- Publication date: 1992
- Publication place: United States

Engineering and the Mind's Eye (1992) is a book by Eugene S. Ferguson, an engineer and historian of science and technology. It was published by MIT Press. In it, Ferguson discusses the importance of the mind's eye for the practicing engineer, including spatial visualization and visual thinking.

== Preface ==
A major argument of the book is summarized as follows in the preface:

Since World War II, the dominant trend in engineering has been away from knowledge that cannot be expressed as mathematical relationships. The art of engineering has been pushed aside in favor of the "engineering sciences," which are higher in status and easier to teach. The underlying argument of this book is that an engineering education that ignores its rich heritage of nonverbal learning will produce graduates who are dangerously ignorant of the myriad subtle ways in which the real world differs from the mathematical world their professors teach them.

=== Review ===
The book was reviewed in The New York Times in an article titled “Seeing Is Understanding”. Eda Kranakis reviewed the book in the April 1994 issue of Technology and Culture.

== Chapters ==
The book comprises 7 chapters and two additional sections on notes about the text and its figures. The chapters are:

1. The Nature of Engineering Design
2. The Mind's Eye
3. Origins of Modern Engineering
4. The Tools of Visualization
5. The Development and Dissemination of Engineering Knowledge
6. The Making of an Engineer
7. The Gap between Promise and Performance.
