= My Mind's Eye =

My Mind's Eye may refer to:

- "My Mind's Eye" (song), a 1966 song by Small Faces
- My Mind's Eye (album), 1992 album by The Comsat Angels, or the title song
- "My Mind's Eye", 2006 single by Sirenia from Nine Destinies and a Downfall
