= Visual reasoning =

Visual reasoning is the process of manipulating one's mental image of an object in order to reach a certain conclusion – for example, mentally constructing a piece of machinery to experiment with different mechanisms. In a frequently cited paper in the journal Science and a later book, Eugene S. Ferguson, a mechanical engineer and historian of technology, claims that visual reasoning is a widely used tool used in creating technological artefacts. There is ample evidence that visual methods, particularly drawing, play a central role in creating artefacts. Ferguson's visual reasoning also has parallels in philosopher David Gooding's argument that experimental scientists work with a combination of action, instruments, objects and procedures as well as words. That is, with a significant non-verbal component.

Ferguson argues that non-verbal reasoning does not get much attention in areas like history of technology and philosophy of science because the people involved are verbal rather than visual thinkers.

Those who use visual reasoning, notably architects, designers, engineers, and certain mathematicians conceive and manipulate objects in "the mind's eye" before putting them on paper. Having done this the paper or computer versions (in CAD) can be manipulated by metaphorically "building" the object on paper (or computer) before building it physically.

Nikola Tesla claimed that the first alternating current motor he built ran perfectly because he had visualized and "run" models of it in his mind before building the prototype.

== See also ==
- Diagrammatic reasoning
- Scientific visualization
- Visual analytics
