= Wide-area motion imagery =

Approach to surveillance and intelligence gathering

Wide-area motion imagery (WAMI) is an approach to surveillance, reconnaissance, and intelligence-gathering that employs specialized software and a powerful camera system—usually airborne, and for extended periods of time—to detect and track hundreds of people and vehicles moving out in the open, over a city-sized area, kilometers in diameter. For this reason, WAMI is sometimes referred to as wide-area persistent surveillance (WAPS) or wide-area airborne surveillance (WAAS).

A WAMI sensor images the entirety of its coverage area in real time. It also records and archives that imagery in a database for real-time and forensic analysis. WAMI operators can use this live and recorded imagery to spot activity otherwise missed by standard video cameras with narrower fields of view, analyze these activities in context, distinguish threats from normal patterns of behavior, and perform the work of a larger force.

Military and security personnel are the typical users of WAMI, employing the technology for such missions as force protection, base security, route reconnaissance, border security, counter-terrorism, and event security. However, WAMI systems can also be used for disaster response, traffic pattern analysis, wildlife protection, and law enforcement.

== Capabilities and enabling technologies ==
The typical WAMI sensor produces imagery at an update rate of 1 Hz or faster from one or more multiple megapixel cameras. The system then seamlessly stitches together the collected images and applies algorithms to geo-register them, ensuring that the sensor picture represents ground truth.

As far as resolution goes, WAMI systems usually have a 0.5 meter ground sample distance (GSD)—enough to detect and track moving targets throughout the scene. Should a user need to take a closer look at a subject, the WAMI system can cue other available sensors, such as hi-res full-motion video cameras, to make the identification. Users can select different video streams pulled from the WAMI system's vast field of view and, with the help of advanced data compression techniques, watch them live on their computer screens or handheld devices. In some systems, users can also designate "watchboxes" within the sensor's field of view to provide automated alerts should the system detect movement in the area.

All WAMI is tagged for time and location before being stored in an airborne or ground-based database. Users can remotely access this database and, similar to DVR functionality, can speed through or rewind the imagery to find specific incidents. In addition, just as with the real-time imagery, WAMI users can pan, tilt, and zoom within the archived imagery.

== Evolution of WAMI systems ==
The very first WAMI system was developed in the early 2000s by a Lawrence Livermore National Laboratory team led by John Marion, as part of the Sonoma Persistent Surveillance Program. In 2005, the sensor transitioned to the U.S. Department of Defense, and in 2006, the Army sent the system—dubbed Constant Hawk—to Iraq on Short 360-300 turboprop aircraft as part of a Quick Reaction Capability. Three years later, Constant Hawk also deployed to Afghanistan.

Weighing 1500 pounds, Constant Hawk initially comprised six electro-optical 11-megapixel cameras that covered 25 square kilometers. This payload was later upgraded to six 16-megapixel cameras.

Since the deployment of Constant Hawk, WAMI systems have gotten smaller, lighter, and more capable. The current generation Kestrel Block II, for instance, employs eight electro-optical/infrared cameras that, together, form a 440-megapixel mosaic and cover 113 square kilometers. Yet this WAMI system weighs less than 85 pounds—light enough to be mounted on a tethered blimp, or aerostat, which can be kept aloft for weeks at a time.

== List of WAMI systems ==
- Constant Hawk
- Angel Fire
- Blue Devil
- Lightweight Expeditionary Airborne Persistent Surveillance (LEAPS)
- Airborne Wide Area Persistent Surveillance Sensor (AWAPPS)
- Kestrel
- Kestrel Block II (formerly KS-200)
- Autonomous Real-Time Ground Ubiquitous Surveillance Imaging System (ARGUS-IS)
- Gorgon Stare
- Redkite
- Simera
- CorvusEye
- SkEye
- HawkEye II
- Heli-Tele
- WASP (IAI/TAMAM)
- POPSTAR (IAI/TAMAM)
- ESEN Systems Integration WAMI
