= Gorgon Stare =

US drone reconnaissance sensor

General information
- Type: Reconnaissance aircraft sensor
- National origin: United States
- Manufacturer: Sierra Nevada Corporation
- Designer: DARPA
- Status: In active service
- Primary user: United States Air Force

History
- Introduction date: 2011

Gorgon Stare is a video capture technology developed by the United States military. It is a spherical array of nine cameras attached to an aerial drone. The US Air Force calls it "wide-area surveillance sensor system".

== Background ==
The system is capable of capturing motion imagery of an entire city, which can then be analyzed by people or an artificial intelligence, such as the Mind's Eye project being developed by the Defense Advanced Research Projects Agency. This motion imagery is not considered video as it is collected at fewer frames per second than the standard definition of video; TV-like quality of video is 24–60 FPS. Gorgon Stare needs to utilize a system of tagging and metadata to be fully effective. The Air Force planned to deliver one system in 2011, another in 2012, and a third in 2014, though they would not enter service until accepted by the commander in the theatre of operations. Gorgon Stare was under development for more than two years and is designed to download 65 different images to a variety of military users for analysis; this is what is referred to as "wide-area persistent surveillance."

During the Global War on Terror, using unmanned aerial vehicles for persistent surveillance dramatically changed the way the U.S. military pursued fleeting targets. However, their sensors provided very narrow fields of view, referred to by warfighters as looking at the battlefield through a "soda straw," allowing insurgents to disappear from view and not giving information on what was happening in surrounding areas. In 2009, the U.S. Air Force began development of a wide-area surveillance system to enable the MQ-9 Reaper long-endurance UAV to survey an entire small city from 25,000 ft (7,600 m). Requiring fewer systems to recon a large area frees up more available assets to be able to perform other missions and enables operations to be more limited where a light "footprint" is desired.

== Development ==
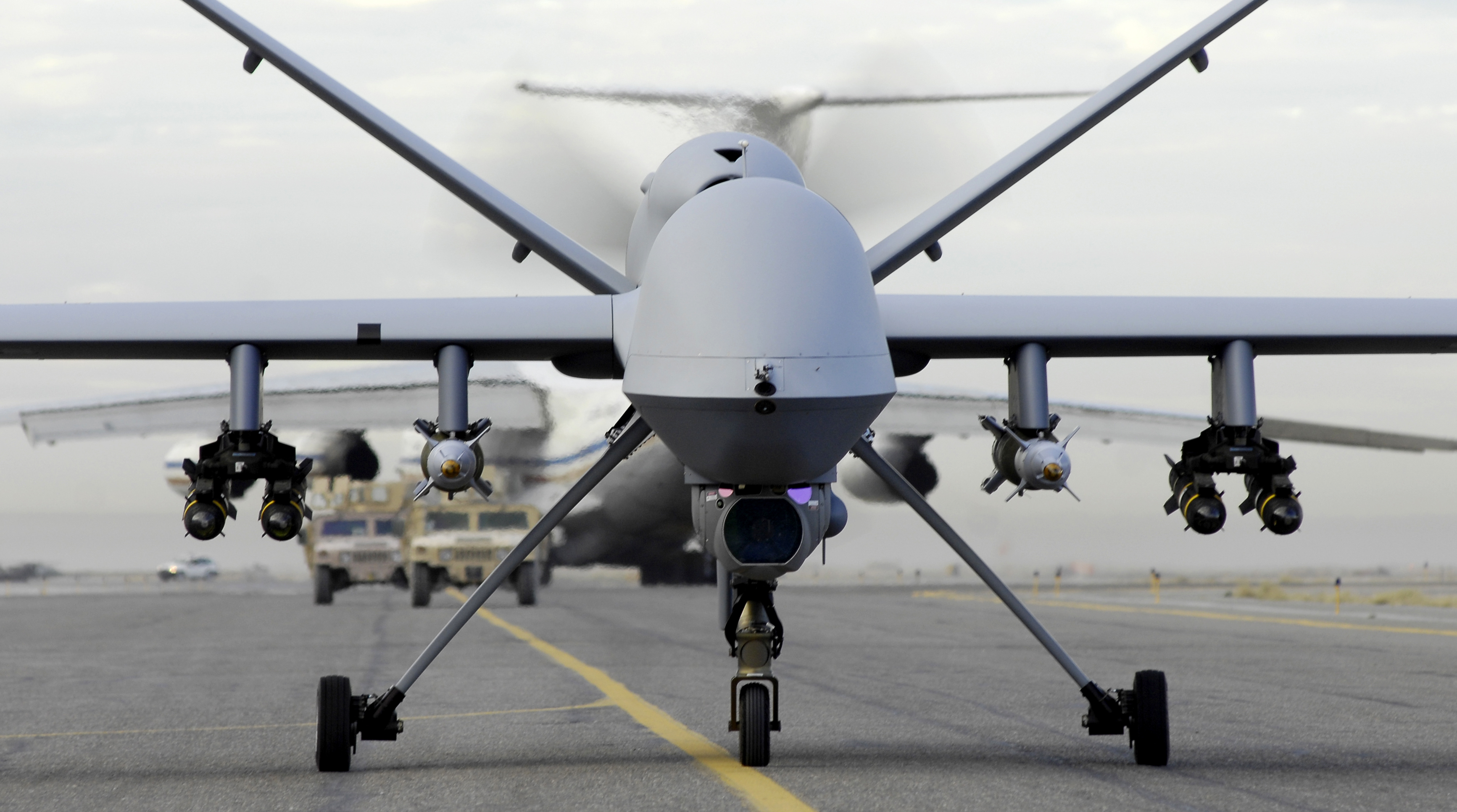
An armed MQ-9 Reaper on a taxiway at Kandahar Airfield. Although the MQ-9 is capable of carrying a variety of munitions, the Gorgon Stare MQ-9's are unarmed.

Gorgon Stare was developed and tested on the MQ-9 Reaper at Eglin Air Force Base, Florida with the 53rd Wing. These sensor pods had been in development since 2009 by the Air Force's Big Safari group and Sierra Nevada Corporation.

In January 2011, it was announced that the program was not performing to expectations, and included faults such as "a large black triangle moving throughout the image" due to failure to combine the images taken by the multiple cameras, a faulty coordinate grid for the chipped-out imagery, inferior image quality compared to older systems, a problematic night-vision system, inability to track people on the surface, delays of up to eighteen seconds in sending data to the ground, and an incompatibility with the handheld Rover 5 computers. In response, the Air Force said that several of the flaws had been fixed since the report detailing the issues had been written, that the system was never designed to offer high-resolution imagery over a wide area, and that in some areas the testing was "not sufficiently constructed to objectively evaluate the capabilities of the system," according to an anonymous source involved with the program.

Development costs are in the $15 million range. This sensor could photograph an area with a four-kilometer radius underneath the MQ-9 Reaper. The Reaper can fly both day and night operations from 12 angles; as reported by Robert Marlin, a technical adviser for the Air Force. The first Gorgon Stare system consisted of two sensor pods, one carrying electro-optical (EO) and infrared cameras (IR), the other digital processors and data-links that enabled quick transmission of actionable intelligence to operations centers and troops in the field. The system delivered three "tiers" of surveillance down to small details within the broader field of view, so users receiving images within seconds after collection could identify items of immediate tactical interest, and recorded data would be stored for up to 30 days. Two Reapers could provide continuous surveillance over a large area to track enemy movements and use recorded data to conduct after-action analyses.

Lt. Gen. Craig Koziol, the director of the ISR Task Force, reported in a news conference that Gorgon Stare was planned to be deployed in December 2011. From March 2011 to July 2014, the first increment of the system performed 10,000 hours of direct combat support, achieving a 95 percent availability rate. With its initial success, the Air Force began refining the system, since the first version was experimental and deployed quickly to address pressing tactical needs.

=== Phase two ===
Phase two (also referred to as Increment 2, or "Inc two") integrated processes of tracking algorithms from the ARGUS-IS system. Argus is a system of tools also developed by the Defense Advanced Research Projects Agency.

On 1 July 2014, Sierra Nevada Corporation revealed that the Gorgon Stare Increment 2 pod had achieved initial operating capability (IOC) earlier in the year. While the Increment 1 system, first fielded in March 2011, could cover an area of 16 km^{2} (6.2 mi^{2}), the incorporation of the ARGUS-IS expands that coverage area to 100 km^{2} (39 mi^{2}). The system has 368 cameras capable of capturing 5 million pixels each to create an image of about 1.8 billion pixels. Video is collected at a variable frame-rate per second, with the resulting data output averaging several terabytes of video output per minute.

Increment 2 provides a four-fold increase in coverage and twice the imagery resolution thanks to ARGUS technology; ARGUS is essentially 368 five-megapixel smartphone cameras clustered together and peering through four telescopic lenses and is produced by BAE Systems, while the IR arrays are produced by Exelis Inc. and are the largest available, which were separated from the EO sensors and moved to the adjacent pod. Sierra Nevada Corporation remained the overall system integrator, meaning it is responsible for merging the sensors, processors, data-links and air vehicle into one package that distributes information in real-time with minimal latency through the joint force's tactical intelligence network. By early 2015, Increment 2 had replaced all initial versions of the Gorgon Stare in operational service.

A Gorgon Stare Increment 2 MQ-9 aircraft departing from Kandahar Airfield.

== Similar systems ==
A similar system was planned to be installed on the Blue Devil blimp, a spy blimp developed for the US Air Force. However, the Blue Devil was cancelled in 2012.

In 2006, a similar wide-area surveillance system, Constant Hawk, was being tested by the US Army. Also, in 2007, the Marine Corps tested an upgrade of the Constant Hawk, called Angel Fire. Both of these sensors were mounted under aircraft in Iraq and Afghanistan Wars.

== See also ==
- ARGUS-IS
- Wide-area motion imagery
