= Constant Hawk =

US Army wide-area motion imagery system

Constant Hawk is a United States Army wide-area motion imagery system flown on crewed reconnaissance aircraft in Iraq and Afghanistan.

Constant Hawk was the first airborne Wide Area Persistent Sensor developed and deployed by the United States. It flew over 66 thousand flight hours in Iraq on five aircraft and is directly and indirectly credited with producing the intelligence data that dramatically reduced IED production and deployment.

Like similar wide-area surveillance systems, such as Gorgon Stare, ARGUS-IS or the aerostat-mounted Kestrel, Constant Hawk was designed to give operators a fuller view of an area (such as a battlefield or operating base) than they would normally get from standard full-motion video cameras.

The Army first deployed Constant Hawk in 2006 as part of a Quick Reaction Capability to help combat enemy ambushes and improvised explosive devices (IEDs) in Afghanistan and Iraq.

Constant Hawk flew on Short 360-300s in Iraq under the command of Task Force ODIN. The system was introduced to Afghanistan in 2009, where it is still in use aboard MC-12W Liberty aircraft.

== Development ==
Initial work on Constant Hawk began in the early 2000s (decade) at Lawrence Livermore National Laboratory as part of the Sonoma Persistent Surveillance Program, a U.S. Department of Energy effort to monitor nuclear proliferation.

In 2005, Constant Hawk was passed to the U.S. Department of Defense, which led to its development under the Army Research Laboratory in Aberdeen, MD.

Since 2005, MIT has been developing processing algorithms enabling efficient formation, exploitation and dissemination of Constant Hawk imagery.

In 2009, BAE Systems provided an additional, infrared payload for Constant Hawk called the Airborne Wide Area Persistent Surveillance Sensor (AWAPSS).

In 2013, the MIT sensor MASIVS was deployed by Constant Hawk increasing pixel counts by an order of magnitude and providing full color imagery processed in real-time on board the aircraft.

== Features ==
Constant Hawk includes a 96-megapixel camera as part of its sensor suite and software that detects changes and patterns in collected imagery.

This allows intelligence analysts to detect roadside bombs and prepared ambushes.

== Upgrades and similar systems ==
In 2007, the U.S. Marine Corps developed an upgrade to Constant Hawk called Angel Fire. In 2011, a Constant Hawk spinoff called Kestrel began deployment on aerostats in Afghanistan.

Additionally, many of Constant Hawk's capabilities have been miniaturized or improved in newer wide-area persistent surveillance systems such as Logos Technologies' Kestrel. Kestrel reduces size and weight, while increasing image resolution and adding a day/night surveillance capability.

In addition, the U.S. Air Force is working on Gorgon Stare, a wide-area persistence surveillance system designed for the MQ-9 Reaper. Gorgon Stare was initially scheduled for deployment in 2010.

Another system still in development by DARPA is ARGUS-IS.

== See also ==
- Wide-area motion imagery
