= Eugene S. Ferguson =

Eugene Shallcross Ferguson (January 24, 1916 – March 21, 2004) was an American engineer, historian of technology and professor of history at the University of Delaware, particularly known for his 1992 work Engineering and the Mind's Eye.

== Biography ==
Ferguson was born in Wilmington, Delaware, and raised in Ridley Park, Pennsylvania. He obtained his BS in mechanical engineering at the Carnegie Institute of Technology in 1937. A part of the curriculum consisted of regular tours to the plants of heavy industry in the region. In 1955 he obtained MS in mechanical engineering at Iowa State College, with the thesis entitled "Development of the Engineering Profession in America, 1815–1900."

After graduation Ferguson started working in production planning at Western Electric Company in Baltimore. He was also refinery operator at Gulf Refining in Philadelphia shortly before in 1938 starting as construction and maintenance engineer at DuPont. Here he worked in chemical plants that were highly explosive. He later recalled that it was more or less his job "to map where projectiles, including body parts, landed following accidental explosions at the plants so as to understand better what had happened and how to improve both processes and equipment." At DuPont he became head of the department, and continued working in numerous plants in the region of Pittsburgh.

From 1942 to 1946 Ferguson served as ordnance officer in the United States Navy in World War II. He was stationed in the South Pacific, and back in the States at the Charleston Naval Shipyard in North Charleston, South Carolina. In 1945 he encountered naval commander Robert W. Copeland, who lectured Ferguson in naval history and inspired him to turn to the history of technology. Later hospitalized in a navy hospital, he studied American naval biographies. Here he got the idea to write the first biography on Thomas Truxton, commander of a number of famous US naval ships including USS Constellation and USS President, later in 1956 published as Truxtun of the Constellation: The Life of Commodore Thomas Truxtun, U.S. Navy, 1755–1822.

After the war in 1946 Ferguson started his academic career as assistant professor at the Iowa State College, teaching mechanical engineering. In between he worked in industry one last time as plant engineer for the Foote Mineral Company in Exton, Pennsylvania. He returned to the Iowa State College, where in 1969 he was promoted to associate professor. In those years he was inspired by the Iowa State historian of agriculture Earle Dudley Ross (1885–1973) and Harvard's first professor of oceanic history Robert G. Albion, to specialize in the history of science. From 1969 to his retirement in 1979 Ferguson was professor of history at the University of Delaware. In Delaware he was also curator of technology at the Hagley Museum and Library.

Ferguson was a founding member of the Society for the History of Technology and its eleventh president (1977–78). The Society recognized Ferguson's contribution by creating "The Eugene S. Ferguson Prize for Outstanding Reference Work". In 1977 Ferguson was awarded the Leonardo da Vinci Medal, the highest award of the Society for the History of Technology.

== Work ==
Ferguson wrote three major works on the history of technology, starting with Kinematics of Mechanisms from the Time of Watt in 1962, and further Bibliography of the History of Technology. in 1968, and Engineering and the Mind's Eye in 1992. He also contributed to the Propædia, the first of three parts of the 15th edition of Encyclopædia Britannica.

=== The mind's eye: Nonverbal thought in technology, 1977 ===
Ferguson's 1977 paper in Science, entitled "The mind's eye: Nonverbal thought in technology", is credited for clarifying the role of visual reasoning in the thinking process. In this article he reasoned that "Thinking with pictures is an essential strand in the intellectual history of technological development." He concludes his article with the following statement:

Much of the creative thought of the designers of our technological world is nonverbal, not easily reducible to words; its language is an object or a picture or a visual image in the mind. It is out of this kind of thinking that the clock, printing press, and snowmobile have arisen. Technologists, converting their nonverbal knowledge into objects directly (as when an artisan fashioned an American ax) or into drawings that have enabled others to build what was in their minds, have chosen the shape and many of the qualities of our man-made surroundings. This intellectual component of technology, which is non-literary and non-scientific, has been generally unnoticed because its origins lie in art and not in science.
As the scientific component of knowledge in technology has increased markedly in the 19th and 20th centuries, the tendency has been to lose sight of the crucial part played by nonverbal knowledge in making the "big" decisions of form, arrangement, and texture, that determine the parameters within which a system will operate.

In his work claims Ferguson that visual reasoning is a widely used tool used in creating technological artefacts. There is ample evidence that visual methods, particularly drawing, play a central role in creating artefacts.

=== Engineering and the mind's eye 1992 ===
Ferguson later expanded its themes into his 1992 book, Engineering and the mind's eye. This work wanted to demonstrate that "engineering is as much a matter of intuition and nonverbal thinking as of equations and computation." It also argued that, the "system of engineering education that ignores nonverbal thinking will produce engineers who are dangerously ignorant of the many ways in which the real world differs from the mathematical models constructed in academic minds."

One of the chapters is devoted to the tools of visualisation, and traces back their origin to the Renaissance. The inventions of printing, linear perspective and projective geometry significantly enhanced man's ability to convey vision into precise drawings, and exactly duplicate it by printing. These images, as William Ivins, Jr. (1953) had argued, were more than just artistic impression. According to Ivins, the "importance of being able exactly to repeat pictorial statements is undoubtedly greater for science, technology, and general information than it is for art."

Nowadays modern projects, Ferguson argued, can require up to thousands of different drawings and charts. For example, in the production of the British Vickers VC10 airplane over 50.000 production drawings were used. Working with the various contractors and suppliers is unthinkable, without the exact duplication.

== Selected publications ==
- Ferguson, Eugene S. Development of the Engineering Profession in America, 1815–1900, MS thesis, Iowa State College.
- Ferguson, Eugene S. Truxtun of the Constellation:The Life of Commodore Thomas Truxtun, U.S. Navy, 1755–1822. Johns Hopkins University Press. 1955
- Ferguson, Eugene S. Kinematics of Mechanisms from the Time of Watt. Vol. 27. Smithsonian Institution, 1962.
- Ferguson, Eugene S. Bibliography of the History of Technology. (1968).
- Eugene S. Ferguson. Engineering and the Mind's Eye. MIT press, 1994.

Articles, a selection:

- Ferguson, Eugene S. "Toward a Discipline of the History of Technology." Technology and Culture (1974): 13-30.
- Ferguson, Eugene S. "The mind's eye: Nonverbal thought in technology." Science 197.4306 (1977): 827-836.

About Ferguson

David A. Hounshell 2004. Eugene S. Ferguson, 1916–2004. Technology and Culture 45 (October 2004):911-921. (summary)
