= ARGUS-IS =

Cellphone surveillance system in the US

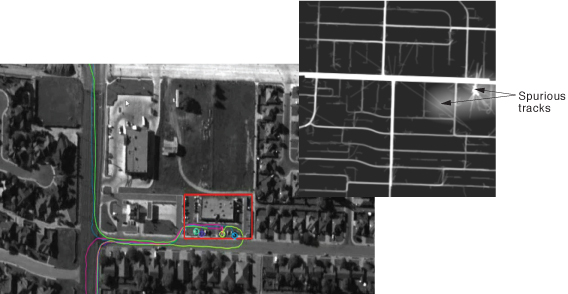
A bird’s eye view of the system.

The ARGUS-IS, or the Autonomous Real-Time Ground Ubiquitous Surveillance Imaging System, is a Defense Advanced Research Projects Agency (DARPA) project contracted to BAE Systems.

ARGUS is an advanced camera system. It uses hundreds of cellphone cameras in a mosaic to video- and auto-track every moving object within a 15 sq mi (39 km^{2}) area.

ARGUS is a form of wide-area persistent surveillance system which allows for one camera to provide such detailed video that users can collect "pattern-of-life" data and track individual people inside the footage anywhere within the field of regard. It uses air assets (crewed aircraft, drones, blimps, aerostats) to persistently loiter and record video of a 36 sq mi (93 km^{2}) area with enough detail to track individual pedestrians, vehicles or other objects of interest as long as the air asset remains circling above. Automatic object-tracking software called Persistics from the Lawrence Livermore lab allows users to auto-track every moving object within the field of regard (36 sq miles) and generate geolocation chronographs of each individual vehicle and pedestrian's movements, making them searchable via geolocation query.

As ARGUS floats overhead for months at a time, it dragnet tracks every moving person and vehicle and chronographs their movements, allowing forensic investigators to rewind the footage and watch the activities of anyone they select within the footage.

ARGUS is only one form of Wide Area Persistent Surveillance. Other WAPS systems are already being used for domestic law enforcement across the USA including Persistent Surveillance, Vigilant Stare as well as Pixia's Hiper Stare. While the United States government has not admitted to deploying ARGUS, it has shown video in which ARGUS was used within the United States. A variety of privacy advocacy groups including the ACLU have worked to bring the domestic deployments of ARGUS and other WAPS systems into the public debate.

Traffic cameras, which were meant to help enforce traffic laws at intersections, have also sparked some controversy, due to their use by law enforcement agencies for purposes unrelated to traffic violations. These cameras also work as transit choke-points that allow individuals inside the vehicle to be positively identified and license plate data to be collected and time stamped for cross reference with airborne Wide Area Persistent Surveillance Systems used by police.

The mission of the Autonomous Real-time Ground Ubiquitous Surveillance-Imaging System (ARGUS-IS) program is to provide users a flexible and responsive capability to find, track and monitor events and activities of interest on a continuous basis in areas of interest. The overall objective is to increase situational awareness and understanding enabling an ability to find and fix critical events in a large area in enough time to influence events. ARGUS-IS provides military users an "eyes-on" persistent wide area surveillance capability to support tactical users in a dynamic battlespace or urban environment.

A demonstration of the system was made available to the PBS program Nova and used in a story on UAVs.

== History ==
The contract was awarded in late 2007 with a budget of US$18.5 million and duration of 30 months.

The first test flight using a UH-60 Black Hawk was declared a success by BAE in February 2010.

In early 2014, the ARGUS-IS achieved initial operating capability (IOC) with the U.S. Air Force as part of Gorgon Stare Increment 2, giving the MQ-9 Reaper the ability to survey an area of 100 km^{2} (39 mi^{2}).

== Specifications ==
The three principal components of the ARGUS-IS are a 1.8 Gigapixels video system plus two processing subsystems, one in the air and the other located on the ground.

The sensor uses four lenses and 368 cell phone cameras, 5 megapixels each.

The system could produce one exabyte of high definition video per day.

== See also ==
- Gorgon Stare
- Wide-area motion imagery
