= José González =

José González or Jose Gonzalez may refer to:

== Arts ==
- José Luis González (writer) (1926–1996), Puerto Rican writer of Dominican descent
- Jose B. Gonzalez (born 1967), Hispanic American poet and educator
- José Emilio González (1918–1990), Puerto Rican critic and editor
- José González (artist) (1939–2009), Spanish comic book artist
- José González (singer) (born 1978), Swedish singer-songwriter
- Jose Luis Gonzalez (artist), American designer, painter, muralist, sculptor, restorer, ceramist, importer, and arts administrator
- José Luis González (composer) (born 1937), Mexican composer
- José González Castillo, (1885–1937), Argentine playwright (Los invertidos, 1914)

== Crime ==
- José González Valencia (born 1975), Mexican suspected high-ranking drug lord
- Jose Gonzalez (born 1991), American criminal responsible for the murder of Yadira Arroyo

== Law and politics ==
- Jose Alejandro Gonzalez Jr. (born 1931), American judge
- José Antonio González i Casanova (1935–2021), Spanish jurist
- José Emilio González Velázquez, Puerto Rican senator and attorney
- José Gonzalez (French politician) French politician from the National Rally
- José González Morfín (born 1954), Mexican politician
- José González Ortiz, Puerto Rican politician and former mayor of Luquillo
- José González Torres (1919–1998), Mexican politician, presidential candidate in 1964
- José Maldonado González (1901–1985), last president of the Spanish Republican government in Exile
- Jose Mari Gonzales (1938–2019), Filipino actor, executive, matinee idol, and politician
- José Soberanis González (born 1946), Mexican politician

== Sports ==
=== Association football ===
- José González (Chilean footballer) (born 1939), Chilean football player and manager
- José Luis González Dávila (1942–1995), Mexican football player
- José González Ganoza (1954–1987), Peruvian footballer
- José Luis González China (born 1966), Mexican football player and manager
- José González (footballer, born 1966), Spanish football player and manager
- José Francisco González (born 1971), Venezuelan footballer
- José Joel González (born 1979), Mexican footballer for Atlante F.C.
- José Manuel González (footballer) (born 1981), Salvadoran footballer
- José González (footballer, born 1991), Panamanian footballer
- José González (footballer, born 1998), Mexican footballer for Tapatío

=== Baseball ===
- José González (baseball) (born 1964), MLB outfielder
- José Estrada González (born 1967), Cuban baseball player and Olympic gold medalist

=== Shooting ===
- José González (Spanish sport shooter) (1907–?), Spanish Olympic shooter
- José González (Puerto Rican sport shooter) (1925–2016), Puerto Rican Olympic shooter
- José González (Cuban sport shooter) (born 1947), Cuban Olympic shooter
- José González (Mexican sport shooter) (born 1948), Mexican Olympic shooter

=== Swimming ===
- José González (Puerto Rican swimmer) (born 1977), Puerto Rican swimmer
- José González (Spanish swimmer) (1906–1997), Spanish Olympic swimmer

=== Other sports ===
- José González (basketball) (1914–?), Chilean Olympic basketball player
- José González (equestrian) (1917–1988), Mexican Olympic equestrian
- José Froilán González (1922–2013), Argentine racing driver
- José González (wrestler) (born 1946), Puerto Rican professional wrestler
- José González (gymnast) (born 1946), Mexican Olympic gymnast
- José Luis González (runner) (born 1957), Spanish middle and long-distance runner
- José Manuel González (athlete) (born 1970), Paralympic athlete from Spain
- José María González (runner) (born 1973), Spanish steeplechase runner, 1996 All-American for the NC State Wolfpack track and field team
- José González García (born 1973), Mexican chess grandmaster
- José González (Dominican athlete) (born 1995), Dominican Republic runner.

== Others ==
- José Manuel González Paramo (born 1958), Spanish economist
- José González-Lander (1933–2000), Venezuelan engineer
- José Eleuterio González (1813–1888), Mexican physician and philanthropist
- José Ramón González, Puerto Rican businessman
- José González Rubio (1804–1875), Roman Catholic friar

== See also ==
- José Gonzales, New Mexican politician
- Ambrosio José Gonzales (1818–1893), Cuban revolutionary general
- José Antonio González (disambiguation)
- José Luis González (disambiguation)
- José María González (disambiguation)
