= José Luis González =

José Luis González may refer to:

- José Luis Capón González (1948–2020), Spanish footballer
- José Luis Félix Chilavert González (born 1965), Paraguayan former professional footballer
- José Luis Duque González (1918–1991), Spanish footballer
- José Luis González China (born 1966), Mexican football player and manager
- José Luis González Dávila (1942–1995), Mexican football player
- José Luis González Novalín (1929–2020), Spanish priest and historian
- José Luis González Quirós (born 1947), Spanish philosopher
- José Luis González Velarde, Mexican professor and researcher
- Jose Luis Gonzalez (artist) (active since 1956), Mexican designer, painter, muralist and sculptor
- José Luis González (composer) (born 1937), Mexican composer
- José Luis González (runner) (born 1957), Spanish middle and long-distance runner
- José Luis González (rugby union) (born 1997), Argentine rugby union player
- José Luis González (volleyball) (born 1984), Argentine volleyball player
- José Luis González (writer) (1926–1996), Puerto Rican writer
- Jesse González (born José Luis González Gudiño, 1995), Mexican-American association footballer

== See also ==
- José González (disambiguation)
