= José Antonio González =

José Antonio González may refer to:

- José Antonio González Anaya (born 1967), Mexican politician
- José Antonio González i Casanova (1935–2021), Spanish lawyer and politician
- José Antonio González Caviedes (1938–1996), Spanish politician
- José Antonio González (cyclist) (born 1946), Spanish former road bicycle racer
- José Antonio González (footballer) (born 1995), Spanish association football player
- José Antonio González Mata (born 1975), Mexican politician
- José Antonio González Pizarro (born 1953), Chilean politician
- José Antonio González (racewalker) (born 1976), Spanish Olympic athlete
- José Antonio González de Salas (1588–1654), Spanish humanist and writer

== See also ==
- José González (disambiguation)
