= Isidre Molas =

Isidre Molas i Batllori
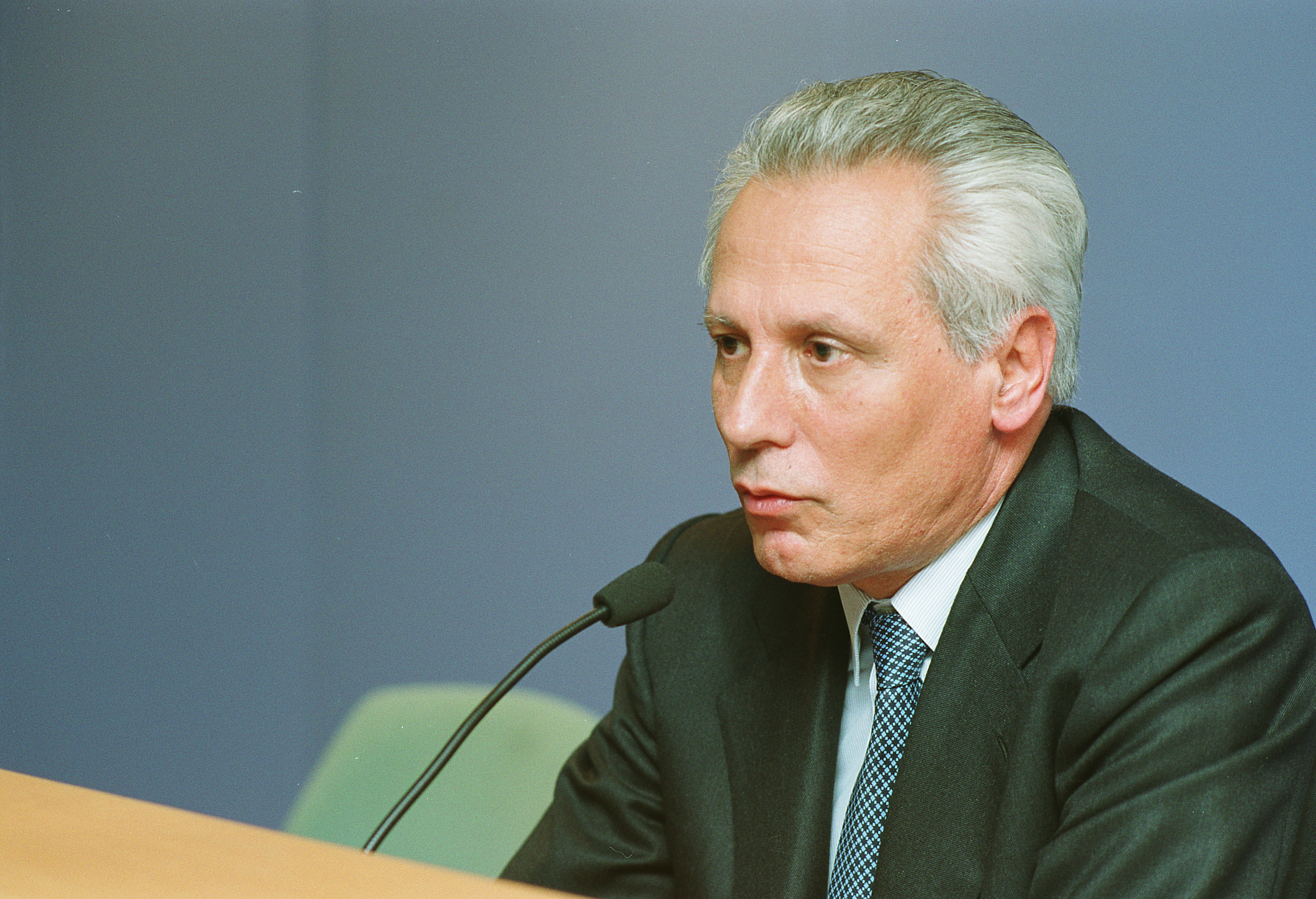
- Molas in 2001

5th President of the PSC
- In office 19 July 2008 – 17 December 2011
- Preceded by: José Montilla (acting)
- Succeeded by: post abolished

Senator from Barcelona
- Incumbent
- Assumed office 5 April 2000

Personal details
- Born: 12 October 1940 (age 85) Barcelona, Catalonia
- Party: Socialists' Party of Catalonia (ECP)
- Occupation: Politician, historian

Isidre Molas i Batllori (born 12 October 1940) is a Catalan politician and historian, who has served as the fifth President of the Socialists' Party of Catalonia since 19 July 2008. He has been a Senator from Barcelona since 5 April 2000.

== Early years ==
Molas was born in Barcelona in 1940. His father was a musician, Isidre Molas i Font, and he is the brother of the historian and writer, Joaquim Molas i Batllori. In 1963, Molas graduated in law in the Autonomous University of Barcelona. He was an active member of the Front Obrer de Catalunya (Workers' Front of Catalonia) and joined the left-wing anti-Franco movement Frente de Liberación Popular (Popular Liberation Front). In 1962 he was judged and condemnated by a military court.

== Career ==
In the first democratic elections in Catalonia after Franco, Molas was elected deputy in the Parliament of Catalonia serving until 1988. From 1985 to 2008, he was the President of the Federation of the PSC in the Province of Barcelona.

In 2000, Molas was elected Senator from Barcelona by the Catalan Agreement of Progress, a union of a left-wing catalanist parties.

Molas has translated books, and he published articles about political science.

== Publications ==
- Ideari de Francesc Pi i Margall (1965)
- Lliga Catalana. Un estudi d'estasiologia (1972)
- El sistema de partits polítics a Catalunya. 1931–1936 (1972)
- El catalanismo hegemónico: Cambó y el Centro Constitucional (1975)
- Salvador Seguí: Escrits (1975)
- Els partits polítics
- Comentaris jurídics de l'Estatut de Catalunya (1982)
- La ciutat llunyana (1981)
- Diccionari dels partits polítics a Catalunya (2000)

Party political offices
Preceded by José Montilla (Acting)	President of PSC; 2008– present	Succeeded by Incumbent
