= Enrique Jiménez =

Enrique Jiménez may refer to:

- Enrique Adolfo Jiménez (1888–1970), provisional President of Panama, 1945–1948
- Enrique el Mellizo (1848–1906) born Enrique Jiménez Fernández, flamenco singer
- Enrique Jiménez (wrestler), Mexican who competed at the 1972 Summer Olympics
- Enrique el cojo (Enrique Jiménez Mendoza, 1912–1988), Spanish flamenco dancer, choreographer, and teacher
