= Rich Hill =

American baseball player (born 1980)

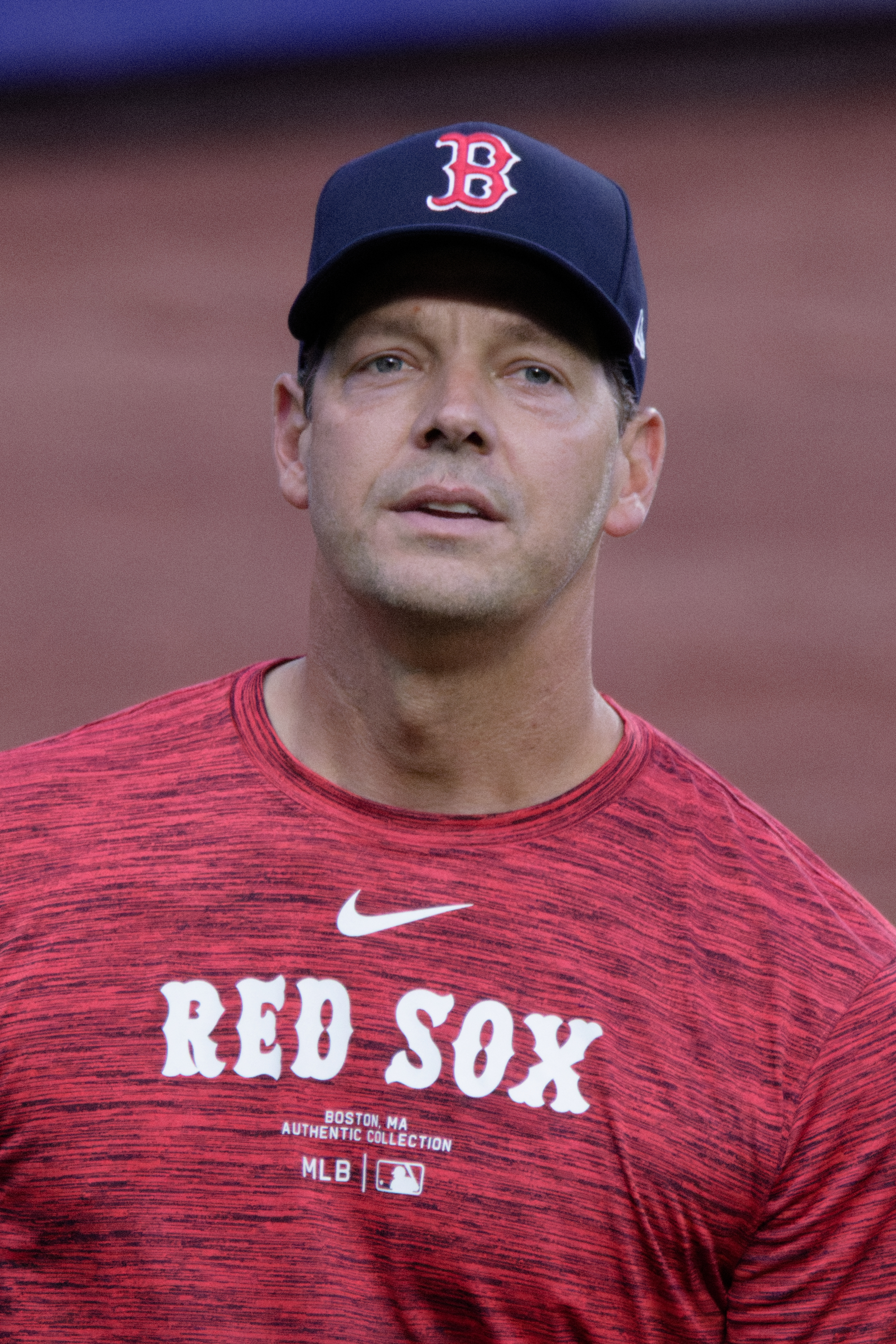
- Hill with the Boston Red Sox in 2024
- Pitcher
- Born: March 11, 1980 (age 46); Milton, Massachusetts, U.S.
- Batted: Left Threw: Left

MLB debut
- June 15, 2005, for the Chicago Cubs

Last MLB appearance
- July 28, 2025, for the Kansas City Royals

MLB statistics
- Win–loss record: 90–76
- Earned run average: 4.02
- Strikeouts: 1,432
- Stats at Baseball Reference

Teams
- Chicago Cubs (2005–2008); Baltimore Orioles (2009); Boston Red Sox (2010–2012); Cleveland Indians (2013); Los Angeles Angels of Anaheim (2014); New York Yankees (2014); Boston Red Sox (2015); Oakland Athletics (2016); Los Angeles Dodgers (2016–2019); Minnesota Twins (2020); Tampa Bay Rays (2021); New York Mets (2021); Boston Red Sox (2022); Pittsburgh Pirates (2023); San Diego Padres (2023); Boston Red Sox (2024); Kansas City Royals (2025)
Medals
Men's baseball
Representing United States
WBSC Premier12
Bronze medal – third place	2024 Tokyo	Team

Richard Joseph Hill (born March 11, 1980), nicknamed "Dick Mountain", is an American former professional baseball pitcher. He played in Major League Baseball (MLB) for the Chicago Cubs, Baltimore Orioles, Boston Red Sox, Cleveland Indians, Los Angeles Angels of Anaheim, New York Yankees, Oakland Athletics, Los Angeles Dodgers, Minnesota Twins, Tampa Bay Rays, New York Mets, Pittsburgh Pirates, San Diego Padres, and Kansas City Royals. He is tied with Edwin Jackson for the MLB record by playing for fourteen teams. He played during each MLB season from 2005 through 2025, and he was the oldest active MLB player in 2024 and 2025.

Hill played college baseball for the Michigan Wolverines. He was chosen three times in the MLB draft, in 1999, 2001, and 2002, before signing with the Cubs. He has earned both American League and National League Pitcher of the Month honors. Hill is the only pitcher in MLB history with a perfect game broken up by a ninth-inning fielding error and with a no-hitter broken up in extra innings by a walk-off home run, both of which occurred in the same game in 2017.

== Early life ==
Hill was born and raised in Milton, Massachusetts. Hill is naturally right-handed but became a left-handed pitcher thanks to his older brother, John. Hill played for Milton High School's varsity baseball team as a freshman. He is one of four players to do so in the school's history. He was drafted by the Cincinnati Reds in the 36th round of the 1999 Major League Baseball (MLB) draft but opted to play college baseball for the Michigan Wolverines.

As a freshman, he struggled with a 9.23 earned run average (ERA) in 13 games, but he became a full-time member starter as a sophomore, posting a record of 3–5 with a 3.84 ERA in 15 games, including one complete game shutout. In 2000 and 2001, he played collegiate summer baseball for the Chatham A's of the Cape Cod Baseball League.

He was drafted again in the seventh round of the 2001 MLB draft by the Anaheim Angels but decided to return to the Wolverines. In his junior season at Michigan in 2002, he was 3–7 with a 3.55 ERA in 15 games, including eight complete games and two shutouts, and striking out 104 while walking only 38.

== Professional career ==
=== Chicago Cubs ===
==== 2002–2004: Drafted and minor leagues ====
Hill was selected in the fourth round of the 2002 Major League Baseball draft by the Chicago Cubs and signed on July 10, 2002, receiving a $302,000 signing bonus. He had been rated as having one of the best curveballs in the draft but mechanical and control issues kept him out of the early rounds. He began his professional career with the Boise Hawks of the Northwest League, where he was 0–2 with an 8.36 ERA in six games. In 2003 with Boise, he was 1–6 with a 4.35 ERA in 14 starts and led the league in strikeouts with 99. He was promoted to the Lansing Lugnuts of the Midwest League, where he was 0–1 with a 2.76 ERA in 15 games (4 starts).

In 2004, he was promoted again to the Daytona Cubs of the Florida State League. He was 7–6 with a 4.03 ERA in 28 games, 19 starts, with 136 strikeouts. Baseball America said Hill had the best curveball in the Cubs organization.

==== 2005 season: MLB debut ====
Hill began the 2005 season with the West Tenn Diamond Jaxx of the Southern League. He made 10 starts in Double-A, with a 4–3 record and 3.28 ERA with 90 strikeouts. He earned a May promotion to the Triple-A Iowa Cubs of the Pacific Coast League. In 11 games for Iowa, he was 6–1 with a 3.60 ERA and 92 strikeouts. He earned Milb.com distinctions as breakthrough performer of the year.

Hill made his major league debut on June 15, 2005, against the Florida Marlins. He pitched one inning of relief, giving up two runs on three hits, and did not factor into the decision. He struck out Carlos Delgado for his first major league strikeout.

Hill's first start was on July 25, 2005, subbing for the oft-injured Kerry Wood against the San Francisco Giants. Once again he gave up two earned runs, but lasted five innings. The game was memorable due to Hill tripping over third-base on his way to the plate after a Todd Walker drive down the right-field line. With just one out and the score tied, Walker was forced to stop at first base, and Jerry Hairston Jr. (who was behind Hill) at second. Hill did not score, and returned to third base unhurt. He did not factor into the decision, a Cubs' victory. He finished the season with an 0–2 record in 10 games (23 2/3 innings) while making four starts. His ERA was 9.13 and he struck out 21 while walking 17.

==== 2006 season ====
Hill started the 2006 season in Triple-A but was called up on May 4 to start against the Arizona Diamondbacks. He gained attention in Chicago later in the month during the cross-town classic with the Chicago White Sox. On May 20, Hill lost to the White Sox 7–0, and was the starter in the game that saw A. J. Pierzynski run over Cubs catcher Michael Barrett at the plate in a huge collision. Hill was sent back to Triple-A Iowa the next day. He made 15 starts for Iowa and was 7–1 with a 1.98 ERA and 135 strikeouts. He was selected to the mid-season Pacific Coast League all-star game, where he was the top star, and he was later selected as a postseason all-star and Baseball America Triple-A All-Star.

Hill returned to the majors on July 27 with a start against the St. Louis Cardinals. He lasted only 3 1/3 innings, giving up four runs on six hits and walking three. On August 1, he defeated the Diamondbacks for his first major league victory, and on August 6, he got his second win and his first win streak. On September 6, Hill fanned 11 batters in a victory over the Pittsburgh Pirates. Hill's first complete game and shutout came against the Cincinnati Reds on September 16, in which he fanned 10 and allowed just two hits. Hill threw the only two complete games by a Cubs pitcher in 2006. He was a solid contributor in the rotation after being called back up, posting a 6–3 record with a 2.93 ERA in the final two months of the season.

==== 2007 season ====
Hill was the fourth starter in the Cubs' Opening Day rotation, following Carlos Zambrano, Ted Lilly, and Jason Marquis. He pitched against the Milwaukee Brewers for his first start of the 2007 season, throwing a perfect game through the first five innings, finishing with allowing one run and one hit over 7 innings pitched. He continued to excel during April, leading some to speculate that he would become the ace in the Cubs rotation as he pitched 18 consecutive innings without an earned run.

Cubs catcher Michael Barrett described Hill's signature pitch as follows:

[Hill's] curveball is so electric that the first couple of times I caught him, I had a tendency to come up on the curve because it bites so much. You just don't see a left-handed curveball like that anymore. When he's good, it doesn't hang, and it's nearly unhittable.

Hill suffered a setback in Philadelphia, where he took his second loss of the season, giving up five runs and leaving the game before getting any outs in the sixth inning. His next start, in New York City, produced similar results and was his third loss. Cubs' manager Lou Piniella pointed to control problems. The troubles continued in San Diego during his next start, where he picked up his third consecutive loss, giving up four home runs to the Padres in a 5–1 loss. Piniella extended his analysis of Hill's throwing: "Not the same pitcher that left spring training. He was missing his spots. Some of those pitches that were hit out of the park, the catcher was sitting on the outside corner and the balls are inside, but they might have been outside. He's got to keep working. He's not throwing as hard, either, for whatever reason."

Hill rebounded in his next three starts, going 21 innings and giving up only two earned runs. Hill had 11 strikeouts against the Braves on June 7. For the season he was 11–8 with a 3.92 ERA in 32 starts with 183 strikeouts.

Hill started game 3 of the 2007 National League Division Series against the Diamondbacks. Outfielder Chris Young homered off the first pitch of the game and Hill only lasted three innings, allowing six hits and three runs as the Cubs were swept in the series.

==== 2008 season ====
Hill reworked his delivery during spring training after some initial issues with his command but remained a starter as the 2008 season began. He struggled from the outset, making five starts with a 1–0 record and 4.12 ERA, striking out 15 but also walking 18. In his final start, against the St. Louis Cardinals on May 2, he walked four of the first six batters he faced and was removed in the first inning. On May 3, he was optioned back to Triple-A Iowa to improve his control.

Hill continued to have control problems in the minors and was placed on disabled list with a back strain on May 17. He suffered from various muscle strains the rest of the season, making only 13 starts in the minors for Iowa, Daytona, and the Arizona League Cubs. He was 4–7 with a 5.85 ERA and 44 walks in 47 2/3 innings the minors in 2008. He played for the Tigres de Aragua of the Venezuelan Winter League after the season and was 1–2 with a 6.86 ERA in 21 innings, walking 23 while striking out 16.

=== Baltimore Orioles ===
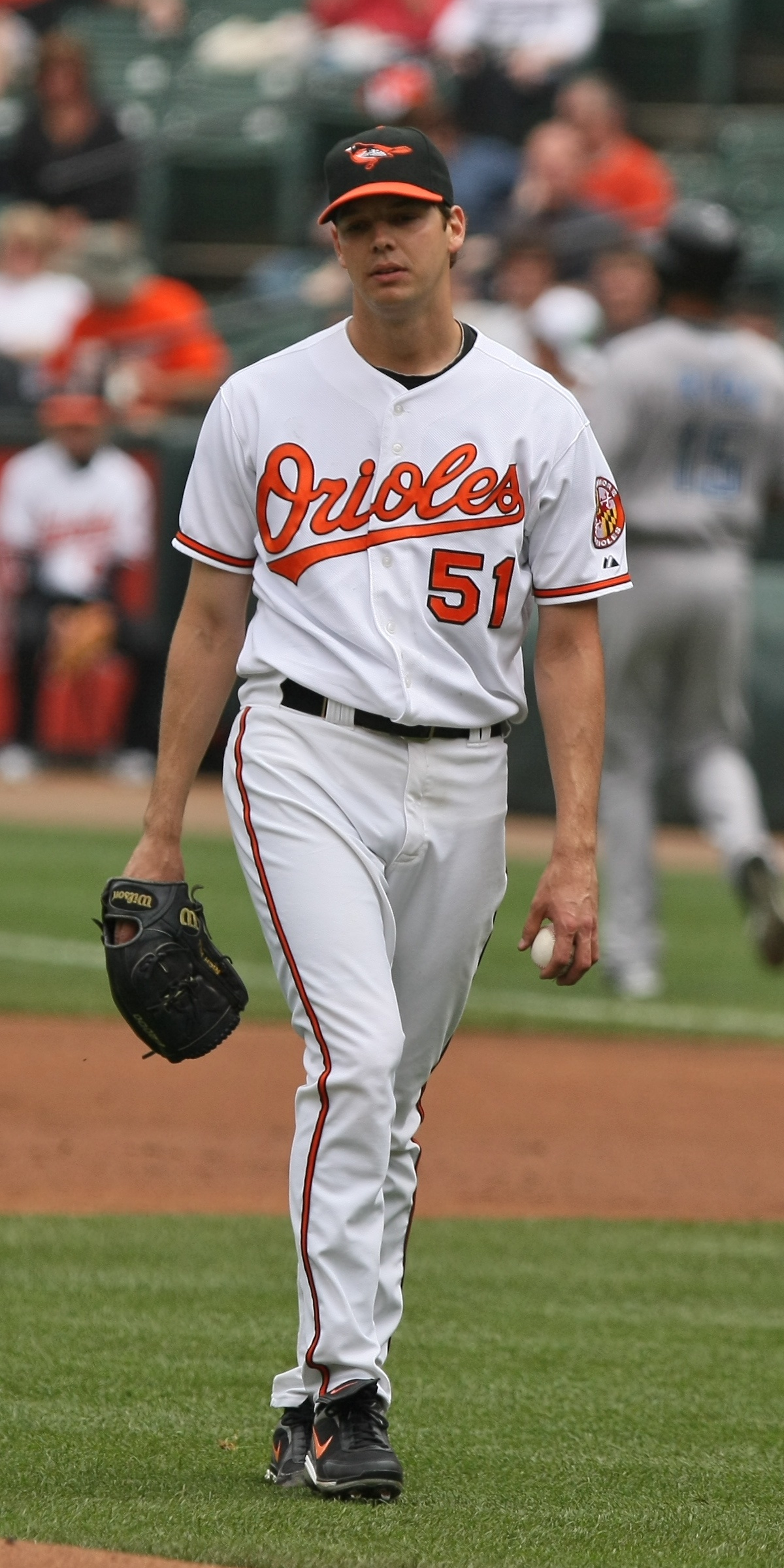
Hill with the Orioles in 2009

On February 2, 2009, Hill was traded to the Baltimore Orioles for a player to be named later, which later converted to cash considerations.

Hill suffered an elbow injury in spring training and began the season on the disabled list. He made his Orioles debut on May 16, going 5 2/3 innings with six strikeouts and earning a win. He started 13 games for Baltimore with a 3–3 record, a 7.80 ERA, and 46 strikeouts in 57 2/3 innings. On July 29, it was revealed that Hill had a torn labrum in his left shoulder and had been pitching through it all season. He was placed on the disabled list for the rest of the season and underwent surgery to repair the labrum on August 8. Hill was outrighted off the 40-man roster on October 30 and elected free agency on November 3.

=== St. Louis Cardinals ===
On January 26, 2010, Hill signed a minor league contract with the St. Louis Cardinals with an invitation to spring training. General manager John Mozeliak said that Hill had recovered from his surgery and was expected to compete for the fifth starter job. Hill struggled in spring training, which was frustrating for him. He was beaten out by Jaime García in the battle for a spot in the rotation.

Hill was assigned to the Triple-A Memphis Redbirds, where he had a 4–3 record in 23 games with a 4.30 ERA and 47 strikeouts in 46 innings. He only made four starts, and was instead used primarily out of the bullpen for the first time in his career. On June 30, he opted out of his contract with St. Louis and became a free agent.

=== Boston Red Sox ===
On June 30, 2010, Hill signed a minor league contract with the Boston Red Sox. He was assigned to the Triple-A Pawtucket Red Sox. He appeared in 19 games for Pawtucket, six of which were starts, and had a 3–1 record and 3.74 ERA. Hill was called up to the Red Sox major league roster on September 13 and made his Red Sox debut in relief against the Seattle Mariners the following day, retiring the one batter he faced and recording the win. He appeared in six games the rest of the season, working four innings in relief, striking out three, walking one, and allowing no runs. At the end of the season, he was outrighted to the minors and became a free agent on November 6.

The Red Sox re-signed Hill to a minor league contract with an invitation to spring training on December 16, 2010. Hill transitioned to a "sidewinder" pitcher during spring training and outperformed other relievers trying to make the roster but was optioned back to Pawtucket to start the season. He appeared in 10 games in the minors, pitching 16 innings and had a 1.12 ERA with one save. His contract was then purchased by the Red Sox, and he was called up to the majors on May 5.

On May 29, Hill injured his left throwing elbow and on June 9, he underwent Tommy John surgery to repair a torn ulner collateral ligament. In nine games with the Red Sox in 2011, he pitched eight innings, striking out 12, walking three, and giving up no runs. On December 12, Hill was non-tendered and became a free agent.

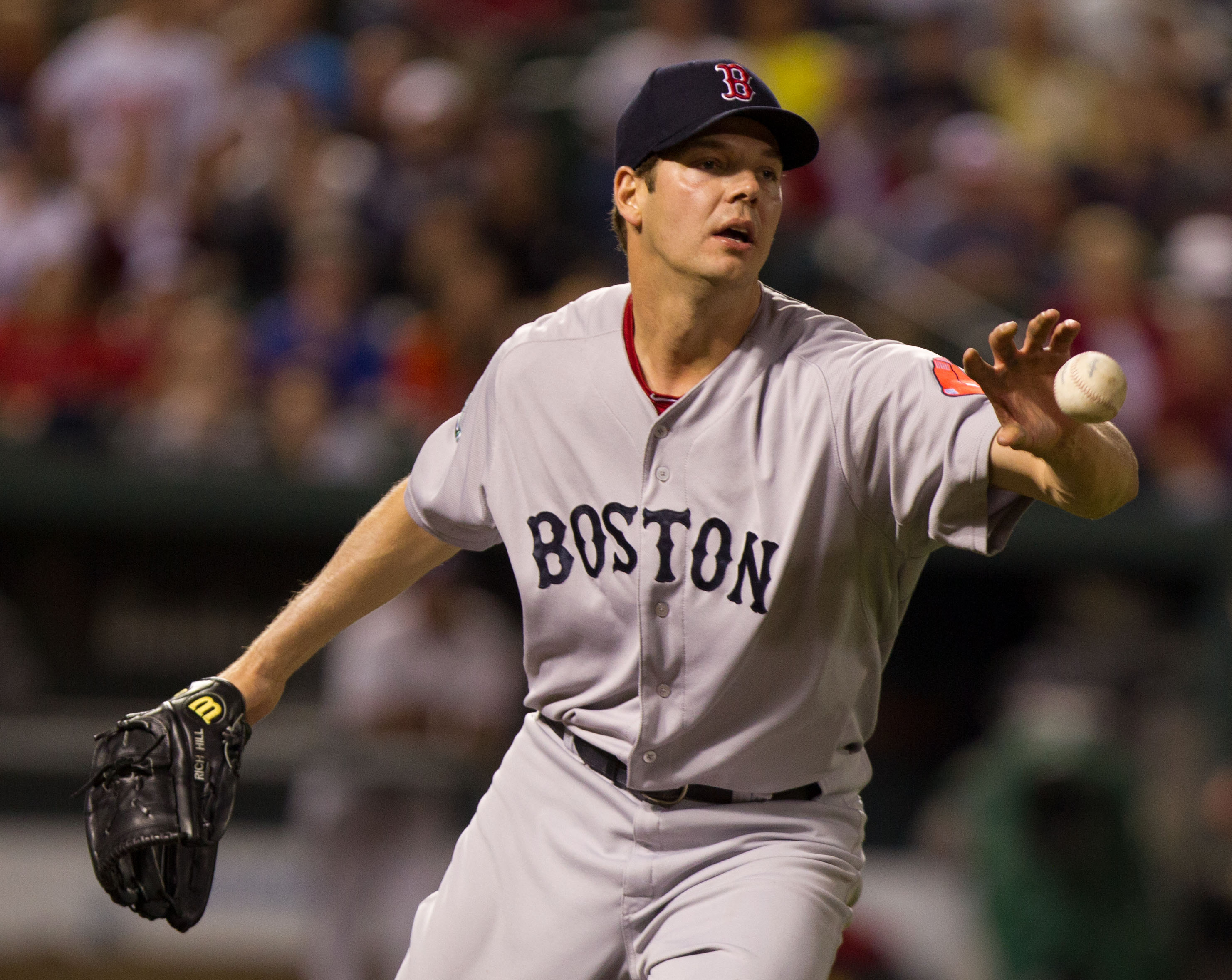
Rich Hill on May 21, 2012

On December 30, 2011, the Red Sox again re-signed Hill to a minor-league contract that included a spring training invitation. His recovery progressed ahead of schedule, and he made his first rehab appearance in the minors with the Greenville Drive on April 7, 2012. He made 16 minor league rehab appearances, across five different levels, and had a 2.20 ERA with 27 strikeouts and five walks. He rejoined the Red Sox roster on April 27. He experienced renewed soreness in his elbow on June 10 and was placed on the disabled list. He was diagnosed with a strained flexor muscle, and he didn't rejoin the Red Sox until September 1. He pitched in 25 games for the Red Sox in 2012, with a 1.83 ERA in 19 2/3 innings and 21 strikeouts. He was non-tendered again on November 30 and became a free agent.

=== Cleveland Indians ===
On February 7, 2013, Hill signed a minor league deal with an invite to big league spring training with the Cleveland Indians. Terry Francona, Hill's manager with the Red Sox, was now the manager in Cleveland and was impressed with Hill's stuff and injury comeback. On March 11, the Indians purchased his contract and added him to the 40-man roster. He made the opening day roster as a relief pitcher.

Hill appeared in a career-high 63 games in 2013, working 38 2/3 innings and was 1–2 with a 6.28 ERA. He also struck out 51 batters while walking 29. His average inherited runners stranded rate was 11.88. He was among the leaders in inherited runners stranded with 51. He became a free agent after the season.

=== Boston Red Sox (second stint) ===
Hill signed a minor league contract to return to the Red Sox on February 9, 2014, which included an invitation to spring training. Hill reported late to the team following the death of his newborn son Brooks at the end of February. The late start caused him to fall behind other relievers in spring training. He did not make the opening day roster and was assigned to the Triple-A Pawtucket Red Sox, where he had a 3.23 ERA in 25 games.

=== Los Angeles Angels ===
Hill was traded to the Los Angeles Angels of Anaheim for cash on July 1, 2014. He appeared in just two games for the Angels, both parts of a doubleheader played that day. In the first game, he allowed a single and walked two batters, and in the second game, he walked the one batter he faced and threw a wild pitch. He was designated for assignment on July 5 and released within a week.

=== New York Yankees ===
On July 17, 2014, Hill signed a minor-league contract with the New York Yankees and joined the Triple-A Scranton/Wilkes-Barre RailRiders. He pitched in four RailRiders games and did not allow a run. The Yankees promoted him to the major leagues on August 5. He was designated for assignment on August 29 and outrighted back to Triple-A but was re-added to the Yankees roster on September 2. With New York and Los Angeles in 2014, he appeared in 14 games, working a total of 5 1/3 innings with a 1.69 ERA. He pitched primarily to left-handed batters, whom he had more success against.

=== Washington Nationals ===
On February 27, 2015, Hill signed a minor league deal with the Washington Nationals that included an invitation to spring training. Even though he was signed after spring training began, manager Matt Williams said Hill would compete for a bullpen spot on the team. Despite pitching well in spring training games, Hill did not make the opening day roster and was assigned to the Triple-A Syracuse Chiefs on April 4. He said he was disappointed by the decision. He appeared in 25 games for the Chiefs, working 21 2/3 innings for a 2–2 record and 2.91 ERA. He opted out of his contract with the Nationals on June 24.

=== Long Island Ducks ===
Hill was determined to become a starting pitcher again. On July 28, 2015, after not receiving any other offers, Hill signed with the Long Island Ducks of the Atlantic League of Professional Baseball as a starter. He made two starts with the Ducks. On August 9, he struck out 14 Camden Riversharks batters in six innings, tying the franchise record. He pitched 11 innings for the Ducks over those two starts, with 21 strikeouts, only three walks two hits, and no runs allowed.

=== Boston Red Sox (third stint) ===
Hill signed a minor league contract with the Red Sox on August 14, 2015. He made five starts for Triple-A Pawtucket and was 3–2 with a 2.78 ERA. Hill was brought up from Pawtucket on September 8 and made his first MLB start since 2009 on September 13, giving up one hit over seven innings, while striking out 10 batters and walking one. On September 25, Hill pitched a complete game two-hitter, striking out 10 batters for the third consecutive start. In four starts for the Red Sox, he was 2–1 with a 1.55 ERA and 36 strikeouts.

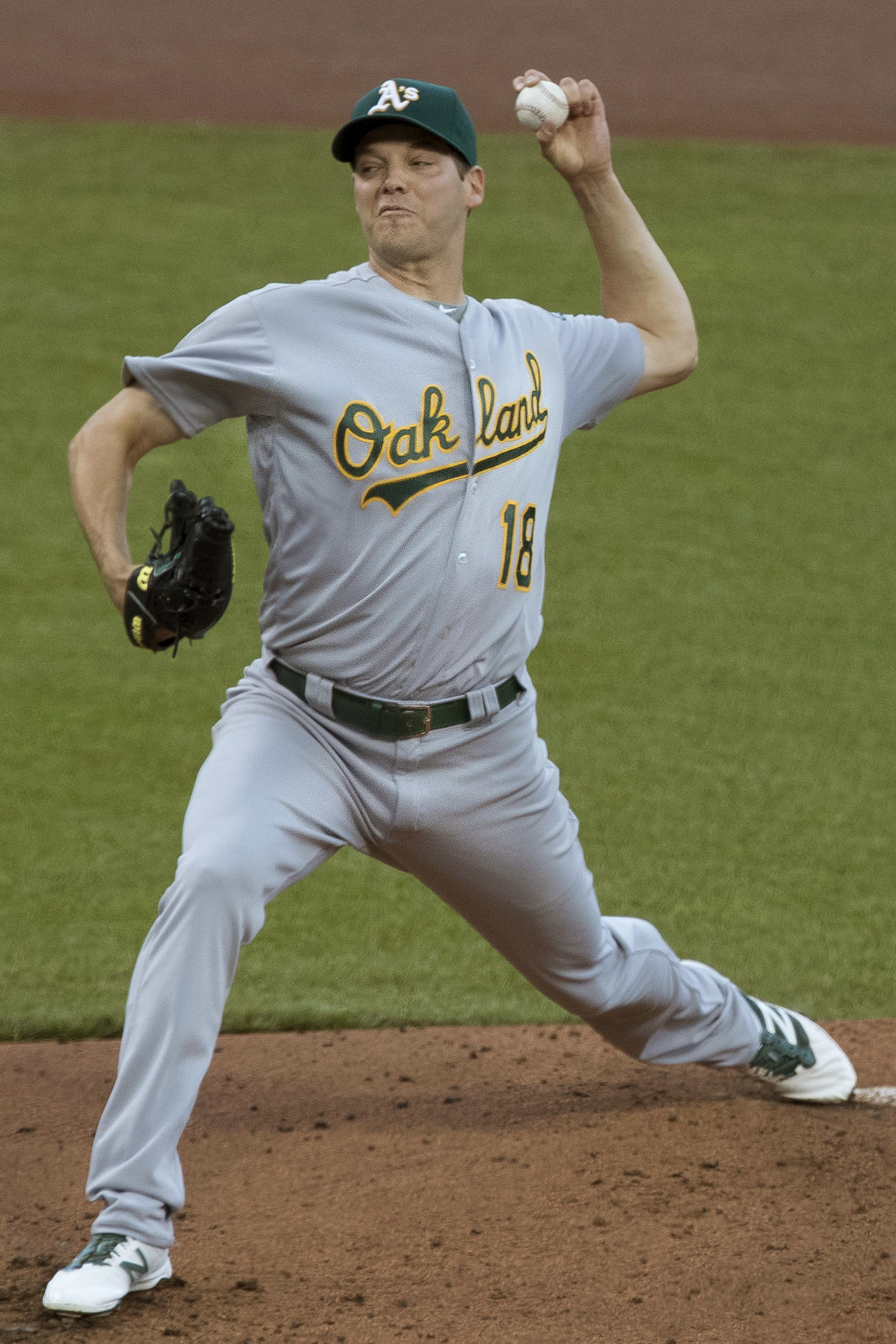
Hill with the Athletics in 2016

=== Oakland Athletics ===
On November 17, 2015, Hill agreed to a one-year, $6 million contract with the Oakland Athletics. After spring training, Hill was named the fifth starter, but ended up starting on Opening Day after planned starter Sonny Gray was hospitalized with food poisoning. With the Athletics, Hill had a 2.25 ERA and a record of 9–3 in 14 starts. Hill was named American League Pitcher of the Month for May after posting a 5–1 record with a 2.13 ERA and 37 strikeouts in six starts.

=== Los Angeles Dodgers ===
On August 1, 2016, the Athletics traded Hill and Josh Reddick to the Los Angeles Dodgers for pitching prospects Grant Holmes, Jharel Cotton, and Frankie Montas. He made his Dodgers debut on August 24, pitching six scoreless innings and earning the win in a 1–0 game against the San Francisco Giants. On September 10 against the Miami Marlins, Hill pitched seven perfect innings before exiting the game. It was the first time in major league history that a manager had pulled a pitcher that late in the game with a perfect game in reach. In six starts for the Dodgers, he was 3–2 with a 1.83 ERA.

Hill started the second game of the 2016 National League Division Series against the Washington Nationals, pitching well for three innings before allowing a three-run home run to Jose Lobaton in the fourth inning of what became a 5–2 loss. He came back to pitch on short rest in the deciding game five, pitching 2 2/3 innings in a game the Dodgers eventually won 4–3. In game three of the 2016 National League Championship Series, Hill allowed two hits in six innings in the Dodgers victory over the Chicago Cubs. However, the Cubs came back and beat the Dodgers in six games to win the series.

On December 5, 2016, the Dodgers re-signed Hill to a three-year, $48 million, contract.

==== 2017 ====
In his first start of 2017, against the San Diego Padres on April 5, Hill pitched five innings but left the game with a blister on his left middle finger. Two days later, on April 7, Hill was placed on the 10-day disabled list. On April 17, Hill was again placed on the 10-day disabled list due to the same finger blister lingering, marking the second time in almost 11 days that Hill went on the disabled list. He returned to the rotation to earn National League Pitcher of the Month honors in July with a 4–0 record, 1.45 ERA, and 40 strikeouts against only 5 walks in 5 starts.

On August 23, 2017, against the Pittsburgh Pirates, Hill pitched a perfect game through eight innings until a fielding error by Logan Forsythe in the ninth inning. He remained in the game for the tenth inning but his no-hitter ended by a walk-off home run by Josh Harrison. It was the first extra-innings walk-off home run to break up a no-hitter, and second walk-off hit to end a no-hitter, following Harvey Haddix in 1959. It was also the first perfect game broken up by a ninth-inning error in MLB history, and Hill became the first pitcher since Lefty Leifield of the 1906 Pittsburgh Pirates to lose a decision despite throwing at least nine innings and allowing one or fewer hits and no walks. For the 2017 season, he was 12–8 with a 3.32 ERA in 25 starts. Hill pitched in one game in the 2017 NLDS, allowing two runs in four innings. In one start in the 2017 NLCS, he limited the Cubs to one run on three hits in five innings, while striking out eight. In two starts in the 2017 World Series versus the Houston Astros, he allowed a total of two runs on seven hits in 8 2/3 innings with 12 strikeouts.

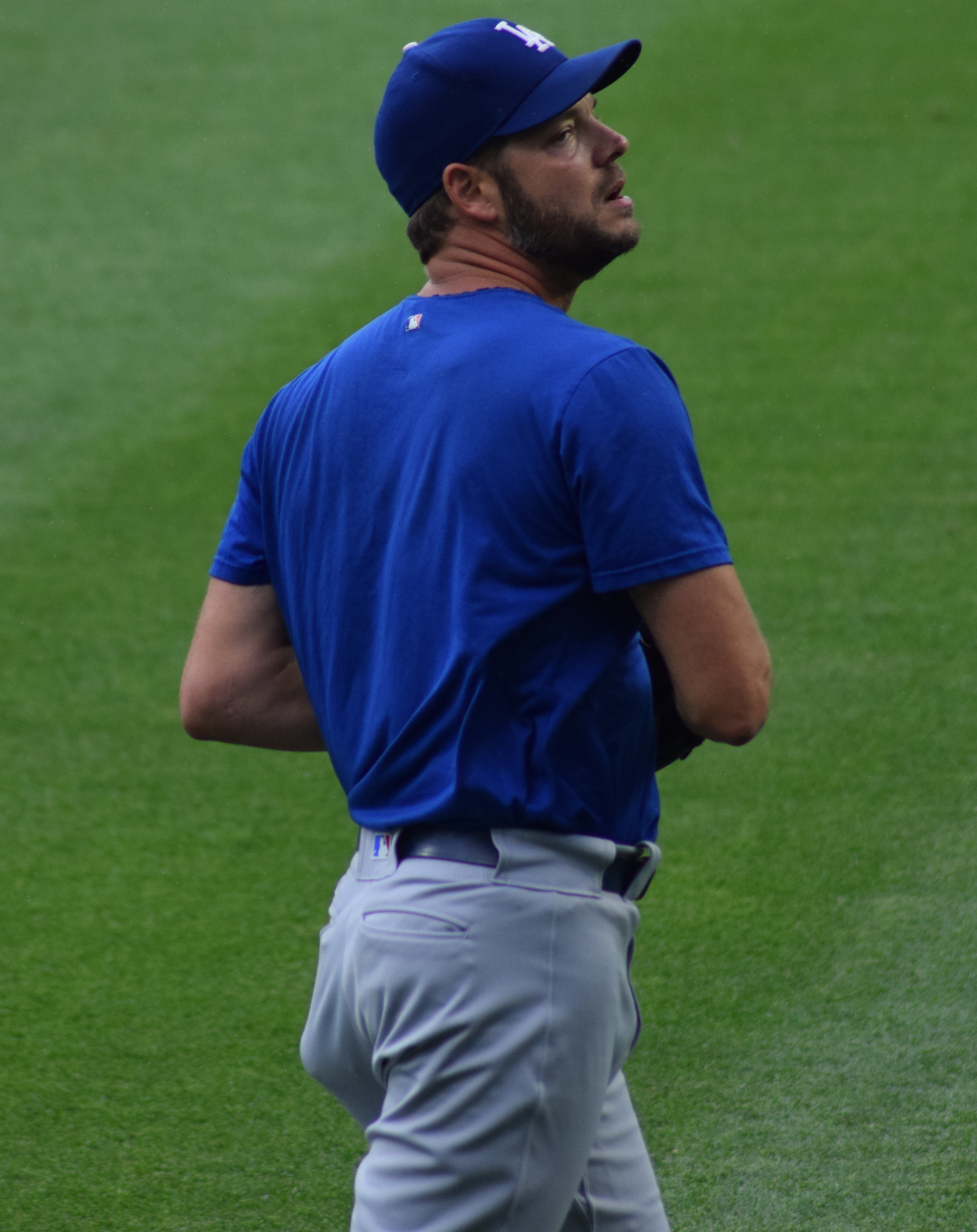
Hill with the Dodgers in 2018

==== 2018 ====
Through the first two months of the 2018 season, Hill landed on the disabled list twice due to recurring blister issues in his pitching hand. He was 11–5 with a 3.66 ERA in 25 appearances, 24 of them starts.

Hill started in Game 4 of the 2018 World Series for the Dodgers, and pitched through six innings against the Boston Red Sox, allowing only one hit and thrown 91 pitches. He was then controversially pulled from the game by manager Dave Roberts after striking out Eduardo Núñez. The Red Sox scored nine runs after Hill's departure from the game in an eventual 9–6 loss by the Dodgers, who lost the series the next game.

==== 2019 ====
After beginning the season in the Dodgers rotation, Hill suffered a left forearm strain in a game on June 19 and was placed on the disabled list. He rejoined the team in September and finished the season 4–1 with a 2.45 ERA in 13 starts. He was awarded the Tony Conigliaro Award for his perseverance during his playing career.

=== Minnesota Twins ===
On December 31, 2019, Hill signed a one-year contract with the Minnesota Twins. On July 29, 2020, he made his Twins debut. Hill appeared in 8 games in 2020, compiling a 2–2 record with 3.03 ERA and 31 strikeouts in 38 2/3 innings pitched.

=== Tampa Bay Rays ===
On February 17, 2021, Hill signed a one-year, $2.5 million contract with the Tampa Bay Rays. He had a career-high 13 strikeouts on May 25, taking the loss against the Kansas City Royals after allowing two runs in 8 innings. He was named American League Pitcher of the Month for May. In 19 starts for the Rays, Hill registered a 6-4 record and 3.87 ERA with 91 strikeouts in 95 1/3 innings.

=== New York Mets ===
On July 23, 2021, Hill was traded to the New York Mets for pitcher Tommy Hunter and minor league catcher Matt Dyer. Hill made 12 starts and one relief appearance for the Mets, with a 1–4 record and 3.84 ERA to finish 2021.

=== Boston Red Sox (fourth stint) ===
On December 1, 2021, Hill signed a one-year contract to return to the Red Sox. He opened the season in Boston's starting rotation. In late April, Hill spent several days on the bereavement list following the death of his father. He was on the COVID-related injured list from May 6 to 14 and was placed on the injured list on July 2, due to a left knee strain, following a start at Wrigley Field. He returned to the team on August 1. In 26 starts with Boston during 2022, Hill posted an 8–7 record with 4.27 ERA while striking out 109 batters in 124 1/3 innings.

On November 6, 2022, Hill elected free agency.

=== Pittsburgh Pirates ===
On January 5, 2023, Hill signed a one-year, $8 million contract with the Pittsburgh Pirates. In 22 starts, he was 7–10 with a 4.76 ERA.

=== San Diego Padres ===
On August 1, 2023, Hill and Ji-man Choi were traded to the San Diego Padres for Alfonso Rivas, Estuar Suero, and Jackson Wolf. Hill pitched in 10 games, with five starts, and was 1–4 with a 8.23 ERA. On September 12, Hill was waived by the Padres.

=== Boston Red Sox (fifth stint) ===
On August 18, 2024, Hill agreed to a minor league contract with the Red Sox. After one scoreless start with the Triple-A Worcester Red Sox, he was selected to the major league roster on August 27. Hill made a relief appearance for the Red Sox on August 29, making him the oldest active MLB player and only player to have played in each of the 20 MLB seasons from 2005 through 2024. In four appearances for Boston, he recorded a 4.91 ERA with five strikeouts over 3 2/3 innings of work. Hill was designated for assignment by the Red Sox on September 6, then released on September 9.

=== Kansas City Royals ===
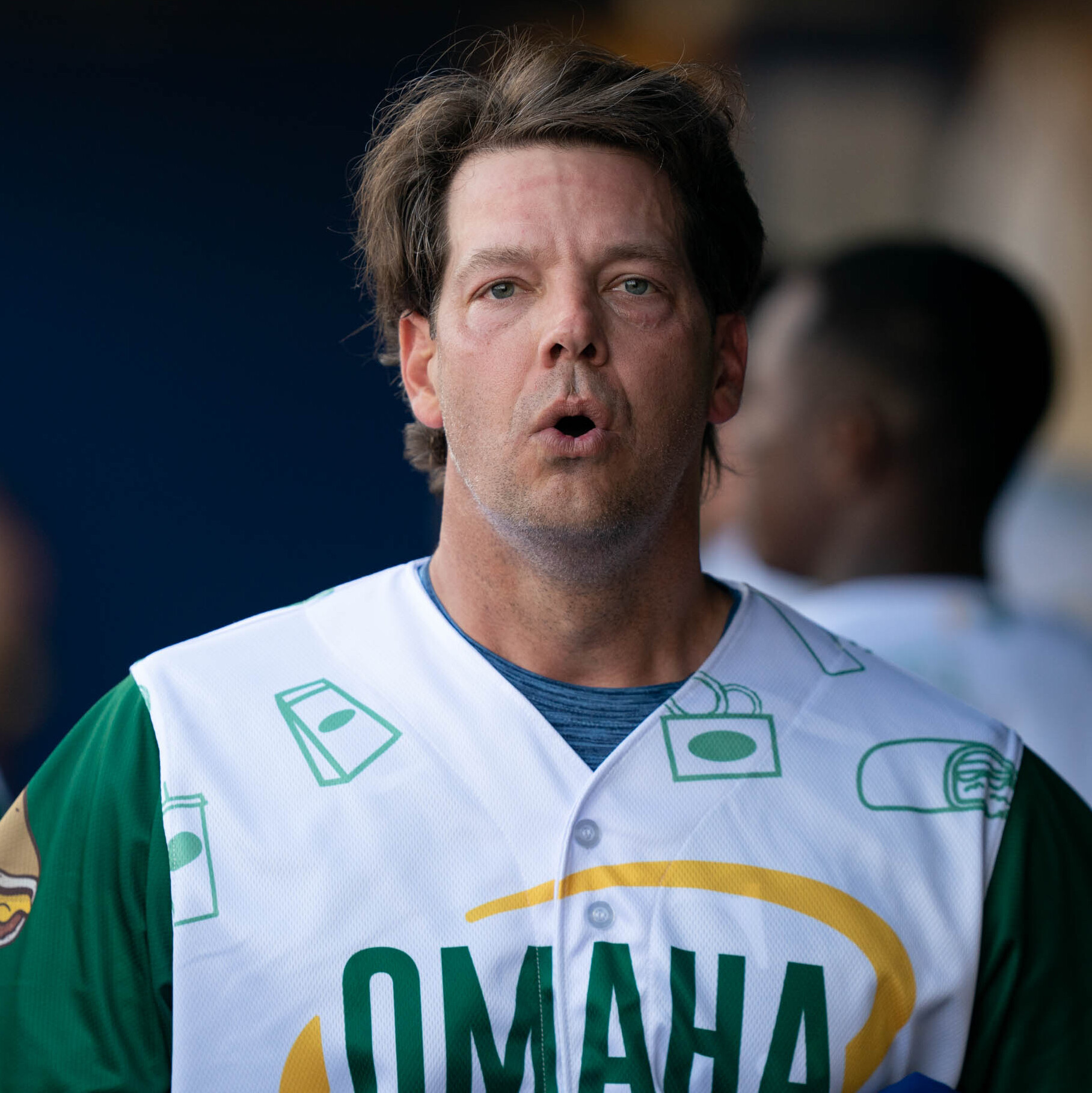
Hill with the Omaha Storm Chasers in 2025

On May 13, 2025, Hill agreed to a minor league contract with the Kansas City Royals, and was assigned to the club's facility in Surprise, Arizona ahead of an assignment with the Triple-A Omaha Storm Chasers. Although the contract gave him the option to become a free agent on June 15 and Hill had not been promoted to the majors by that point, he chose not to opt out of the deal and to remain with the Royals in Omaha. On July 22, Hill was called up by the Royals. He made his season debut as the starting pitcher against the Cubs that same day, tying Edwin Jackson for the most teams played for in league history, with 14. Hill became the 18th pitcher to start a game at age 45 or older and the sixth in the 21st century, joining Jamie Moyer, Roger Clemens, Randy Johnson, Tim Wakefield, and Bartolo Colón. In two starts for Kansas City, he logged an 0-2 record and 5.00 ERA with four strikeouts over nine innings of work. Hill was designated for assignment by the Royals on July 29. He elected free agency after clearing waivers on August 1.

In a podcast episode released on January 17, 2026, Hill said he would not play in 2026 but explicitly avoided saying he was retiring.

During the 2026 season, Hill contributed as a studio analyst for NESN.

== International career ==
Hill was selected to the United States national baseball team for the 2024 WBSC Premier12 tournament, held in November 2024. He was named to the All-World Team as the best starting pitcher after allowing one unearned run and striking out 14 in 10 1/3 innings.

== Nicknames ==
During the inaugural MLB Players Weekend in 2017, Rich Hill wore the name "Brice" on his jersey to honor his son. Hill wore the name "D. Mountain" on his jersey during the 2018 MLB Players Weekend. The nickname originated when Hill played for the Boston Red Sox in 2015. Teammate Brock Holt thought it would be funny to call him "Dick" for "Richard" and "Mountain" for "Hill," creating the moniker "Dick Mountain."

== Personal life ==
Hill married Caitlin McClellan, a nurse, on November 11, 2007. The couple had two sons, Brice and Brooks. Brooks died in February 2014, aged two months, of lissencephaly and congenital nephrotic syndrome, which Hill wrote about in 2019. He donated $575,000 to Massachusetts General Hospital for Children, where Brooks received treatment, as part of a campaign that has raised almost $1 million for research into rare genetic diseases.

Hill was arrested on December 21, 2019, for disorderly conduct and resisting arrest while attending a New England Patriots game at Gillette Stadium, after he allegedly tried to stop police from arresting his wife. The couple reportedly attempted to enter the stadium multiple times with an oversized bag, in violation of the National Football League's stringent rules regarding such matters. Criminal charges were later dropped, and the couple paid $1,000 in civil fines.

Hill's older brother John was a state champion gymnast and performed in the closing ceremonies of the 1992 Summer Olympics.

== See also ==
- List of oldest Major League Baseball players
- List of World Series starting pitchers

Awards and achievements
Preceded by Albert Pujols	Oldest Player in the National League; 2023	Succeeded by Jesse Chavez
Preceded by Albert Pujols (2021), Justin Verlander (2023)	Oldest Player in the American League; 2022, 2024–2025	Succeeded by Justin Verlander (2023)
