= 1992 Summer Olympics closing ceremony =

- Part of 1992 Summer Olympics
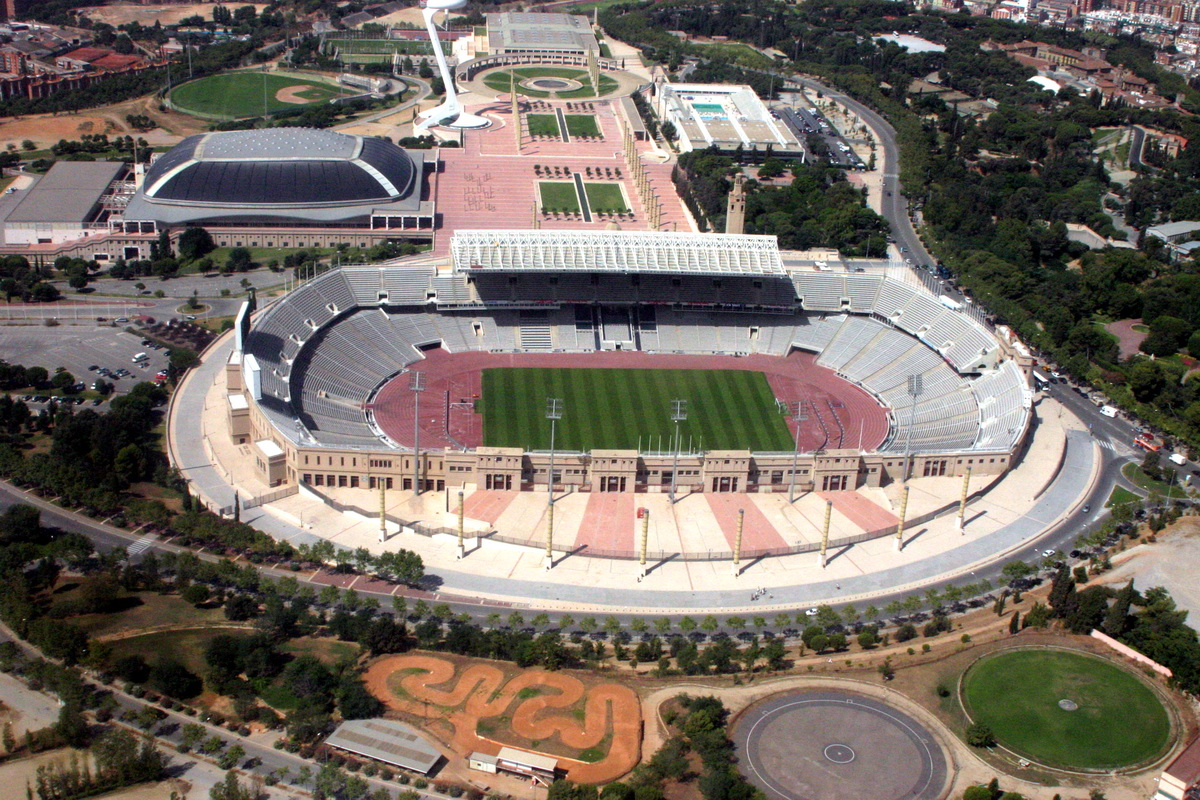
- The Estadi Olímpic de Montjuïc, the venue of the closing ceremony.
- Date: 9 August 1992
- Time: 22:00 - 23:45 CEST (UTC+2)
- Venue: Estadi Olímpic de Montjuïc
- Location: Barcelona, Spain; 41°21′53.14″N 2°9′20.37″E
- Filmed by: Ràdio Televisió Olímpica '92 (RTO'92)
- Footage: Barcelona 1992 Closing Ceremony on YouTube

The closing ceremony of the 1992 Summer Olympics (XXV Olympiad) took place at the Estadi Olímpic de Montjuïc in Barcelona, Spain, on 9 August 1992.

== Events ==
The closing ceremony of the 1992 Barcelona Olympic Games occurred at the Estadi Olímpic de Montjuïc on 9 August 1992. The Mayor of Barcelona and President of the Olympic Organizing Committee (COOB), Pasqual Maragall, delivered a speech in Catalan, Spanish, and English concluding the ceremonies and thanking everyone. The President of the International Olympic Committee, Juan Antonio Samaranch, delivered a speech in Spanish, awarding the Olympic Order in Gold to Maragall and declared the Games of the XXV Olympiad in Barcelona closed. Then Maragall handed the Olympic flag to Samaranch, who then handed it to the Mayor of Atlanta, Maynard Jackson, in anticipation of the following Summer Games. The flag was raised again 18 months afterward in Lillehammer in the afternoon of 12 February 1994, during the opening ceremony of the 1994 Winter Olympics.

The timeline of the ceremony was as follows (all times in CEST):

- 10:00 p.m.: Entry of King Juan Carlos I, Queen Sofía, and Prince Felipe, accompanied by the playing of the Catalan anthem "Els Segadors" and the Spanish national anthem. Other members of the royal family, including the Countess of Barcelona, and Infantas Elena, Cristina, and Pilar, were already present. A fanfare by Josep María Bardagí commenced, featuring a performance by Tricicle.
- 10:06 p.m.: A procession by the mounted section of the Barcelona City Guard with Concierto de Aranjuez by Joaquín Rodrigo.
- 10:16 p.m.: Nine dancers from Cristina Hoyos' company performed to El amor brujo by Manuel de Falla, followed by the Fire Dance featuring Hoyos and two other dancers.
- 10:25 p.m.: Procession of the flags of participating countries to the music of "Ode to Joy".
- 10:35 p.m.: The flags of Greece and the United States were raised, and their national anthems were played.
- 10:39 p.m.: Closing speeches by Pasqual Maragall, Mayor of Barcelona and President of the Olympic Organizing Committee (COOB), and Juan Antonio Samaranch, President of the International Olympic Committee (IOC).
- 10:50 p.m.: The Antwep Ceremony, when ceremonial transfer happened of the Olympic flag from Mayor Pasqual Maragall to Maynard Jackson, Mayor of Atlanta, the host city for the 1996 Summer Olympics.
- 10:55 p.m.: Presentation segment by the next host city, Atlanta called "Spirit of Atlanta", this segment introduced Izzy as the Olympic mascot.
- 11:02 p.m.: Lowering of the Olympic flag while Plácido Domingo sang the Olympic Hymn.
- 11:06 p.m.: Farewell to the Olympic flame with performances by cellist Lluis Claret and soprano Victoria de los Ángeles, accompanied by "El cant dels ocells".
- 11:11 p.m.: A performance by Els Comediants involving 700 actors in a theatrical fire festival with fireworks.
- 11:25 p.m.: Josep Carreras and Sarah Brightman performed "Amigos para siempre".
- 11:28 p.m.: A symbolic farewell with a paper boat carrying the Olympic mascot, Cobi.
- 11:34 p.m.: Fireworks display accompanied by music from Carles Santos, followed by the entry of athletes from the XXV Olympiad.
- 11:45 p.m.: The closing party featuring performances by Los Amaya, Peret, and Los Manolos, including the song "Gitana hechicera" commissioned specifically for the ceremony to Peret. During the performance, athletes climbed onto the stage and were subsequently asked to descend for safety reasons.

=== Parade of Nations ===
The flag bearers of 172 National Olympic Committees entered the stadium informally in single file, ordered by the Spanish alphabet, and behind them marched the athletes, without any distinction or grouping by nationality.

== Officials and dignitaries ==
=== Dignitaries from International organizations ===
- International Olympic Committee –
  - IOC President Juan Antonio Samaranch and wife María Teresa Samaranch Salisachs
  - and Members of the International Olympic Committee

=== Host country dignitaries ===
- Spain –
  - King of Spain Juan Carlos I
  - Queen Sofía of Spain
  - HRH the Crown Prince Felipe
  - Prime Minister of Spain Felipe González
  - Infanta Elena, Duchess of Lugo
  - Infanta Cristina of Spain
  - Infanta Pilar, Duchess of Badajoz
  - Deputy Prime Minister of Spain Narcís Serra
  - President of the Barcelona'92 Olympic Organising Committee and Mayor of Barcelona Pasqual Maragall and his wife Diana Garrigosa.
  - Juan José Omella Omella, Archbishop of the Archdiocese of Barcelona.
  - Ángel Suquía Goicoechea, Archbishop of the Archdiocese of Madrid and then President of The Spanish Episcopal Conference
- Catalonia – Jordi Pujol, President of Catalonia and members of the Government

=== Dignitaries from abroad ===
- United States:
  - Vice President Dan Quayle
  - Second Lady Marilyn Quayle
  - Mayor of Atlanta Maynard Jackson
  - Marvin Bush and his wife Margaret Bush, son and daughter-in-law of U.S. President George H. W. Bush
  - Mayor of the District of Columbia Sharon Kelly
  - Actor Arnold Schwarzenegger
  - Journalist reporter Maria Shriver
  - former Olympians Mary Lou Retton and Kristi Yamaguchi
  - New York Knicks basketball player Greg Anthony
- Norway:
  - Prime Minister of Norway Gro Harlem Brundtland
  - Mayor of Lillehammer Audun Tron (host city of 1994 Winter Olympics
- United Kingdom – Prime Minister of the United Kingdom John Major
- Japan:
  - Prime Minister of Japan and President of the Liberal Democratic Party of Japan Kiichi Miyazawa
  - Future Prime Minister of Japan And President Of The Liberal Democratic Party of Japan Tsutomu Hata
- Sweden – King of Sweden Carl XVI Gustaf
- Italy:
  - President of Italy Francesco Cossiga
  - Future President of Italy Carlo Azeglio Ciampi
- Germany - President of Germany Richard von Weizsacker

== Anthems ==
- National Anthem of Catalonia
- National Anthem of Spain
- National Anthem of Greece
- National Anthem of the United States
- (International Olympic Committee) Olympic Hymn – Plácido Domingo
