= Cristina Hoyos =

Spanish actor and dancer

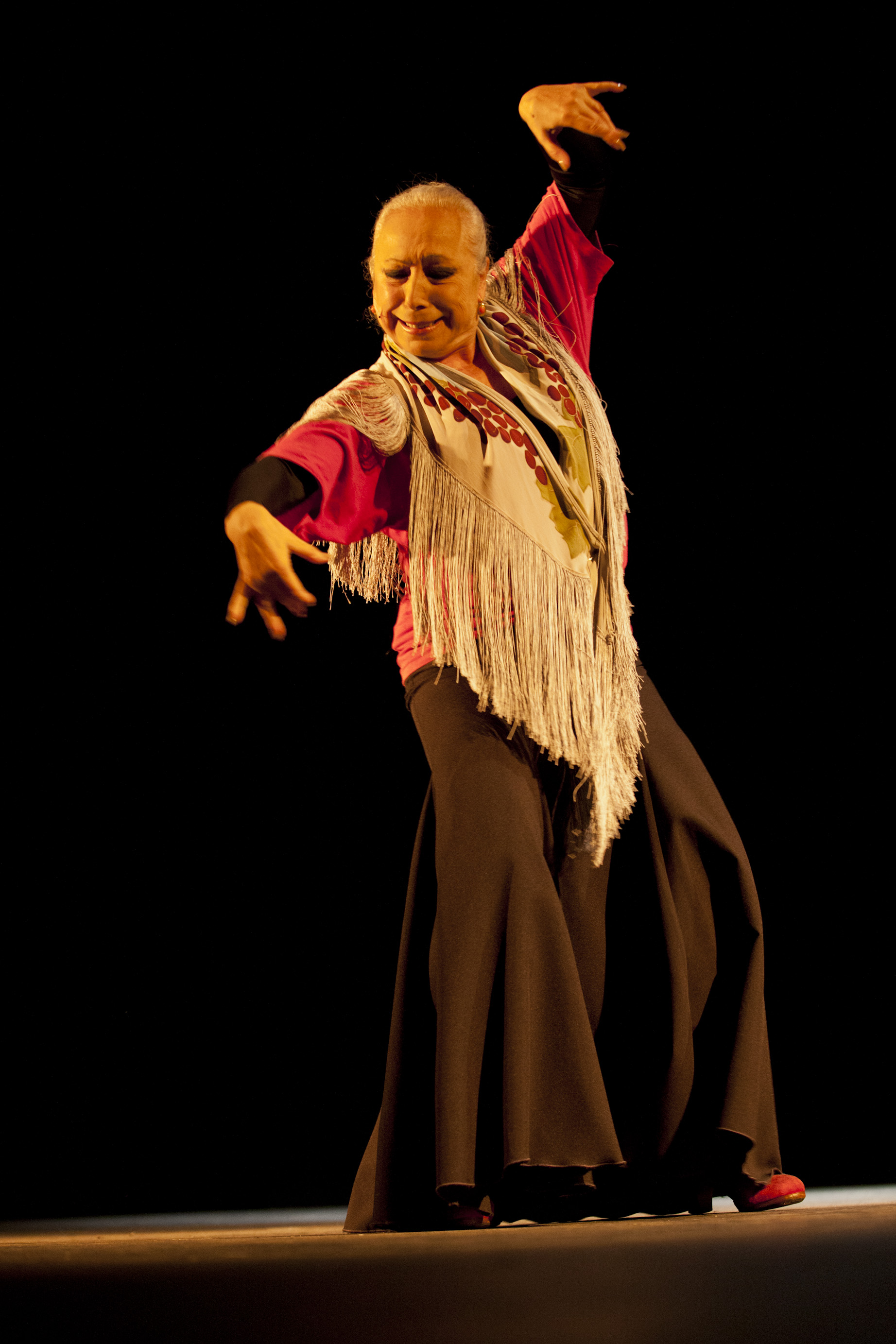
- Born: Cristina Hoyos Panadero; 13 June 1946 (age 79); Seville, Andalucia, Spain
- Occupations: Dancer, choreographer, actress
- Years active: 1948–present
- Spouse: Juan Antonio Jiménez
- Career
- Dances: Flamenco

Cristina Hoyos Panadero (born 13 June 1946) is a Spanish flamenco dancer, choreographer and actress, born in Seville, Spain. After a successful worldwide career, she opened her own dance company in 1988 that premiered at the Rex Theatre in Paris. She played an important role during the opening and closing ceremonies of the 1992 Summer Olympics in Barcelona.

== Career ==
Hoyos started dancing at the age of twelve in the children's show Galas Juveniles. Her teachers, Adelita Domingo and Enrique el Cojo, ignited her passion for dance. In 1969, she joined the ballet company of Antonio Gades where she continued her work for more than two decades. During this time, she toured the world demonstrating her art and starred in the film trilogy Blood Wedding, Carmen, and El amor brujo. In 1983, Hoyos played Carmen in the Antonio Gades ballet interpretation of Carmen in Paris. Her performance received rave reviews.

After 1988, Hoyos appeared in films and TV shows such as Juncal by Jaime de Armiñán, Montoyas y Tarantos by Vicente Escribá, Antártida by Manuel Huerga, and her own biopic Despacito y al compás. At the 1989 Paris Festival, her newly formed dance company debuted Sueños Flamencos. One year later, she would take the show to the Paris Opera House where her flamenco company would be the first of its kind on that stage. This feat was repeated at the Stockholm Opera. She also choreographed Carmen presented at London's Covent Garden by directors Nuria Espert and Zubin Metha.

At the Seville Expo '92, she performed in Yerma and Lo Flamenco. She appeared at the opening and closing ceremonies of the Barcelona 1992 Summer Olympics. In 1992, she brought her show Caminos Andaluces to the Théâtre du Châtelet in Paris.

Hoyos choreographed Cuadro Flamenco presented at the Opéra de Nice in 1996. She choreographed The Hunchback (1997 film). Hoyos ended 1996 by debuting her new show Arsa y Toma at the Opéra d'Avignon. Arsa y Toma featured costumes by Christian Lacroix.

In 1999, her dance company debuted Al Compás del Tiempo and Hoyos choreographed The Fígaro Marriages, directed by José Luis Castro. In 2001, she performed as Carmen in Carmen 2, le retour by Jérôme Savary.

In 2002, she presented Tierra Adentro at the Municipal Theater of Valencia which won the Performing Arts Award for Best Performance. Hoyos presented Yerma, directed by José Carlos Plaza, at the Alhambra in front of an audience of more than 60,000. In January 2004, Hoyos was appointed to head the Andalusian Ballet of Flamenco and one year later, she presented A Trip to the South, directed by Ramón Oller. In 2006, she travelled the world with her show Romancero Gitano, based on the work of Spanish writer Federico García Lorca.

== Personal life ==
Hoyos is married to Juan Antonio Jiménez whom she first met when both were working at the Antonio Gades Ballet Company.

She was diagnosed with breast cancer in 1997 for which she underwent surgery and then fully recovered. She was featured in a book called ¡Ánimo p'alante! by Ángel López del Castillo, a journalist with a specialization in the field of health. López del Castillo collaborated with oncologist Ana Lluch to tell the story of Cristina Hoyos' experience fighting cancer based on an interview López del Castillo had with Hoyos.

== Filmography ==
- 1967 The Last Meeting – Antonio Eceiza
- 1981 Blood Wedding – Carlos Saura
- 1983 Carmen – Carlos Saura
- 1986 El Amor Brujo – Carlos Saura
- 1988 Juncal – Jaime de Armiñán
- 1988 La Ballena Blanca – José María Sánchez
- 1989 Love, Hate and Death – Vicente Escrivá
- 1990 Angels – Jacob Berger
- 1990 Carmen on Ice – Horant H. Hohlfeld
- 1995 Antártida – Manuel Huerga
- 1996 The Hunchback – Peter Medak
- 2002 Despacito y a compás (bibliographic film)
- 2011 Vert, je t'aime vert – Caroline Chomienne

== Awards and honours ==
- 1984:
  - Best Supporting Actress for Carmen – Asociación de Escritores cinematográficos
- 1985:
  - Pegasus Prize - Festival dei due Mondi – Spoleto
- 1991:
  - Spanish National Dance Prize – Spanish Ministry for Culture
  - Gold Medal from City of Seville – Regional Government of Andalusia
- 1993:
  - Andalucian of the year – Casa de Andalucía
  - Gold Medal for Fine Arts – Government of Spain
- 1997:
  - Andalusia Culture Prize – Regional Government of Andalusia
  - Knight of the Order of Arts and Letters – Government of France
  - Audience Award to the best performance – Festival Nouvelle Danse – Montreal
- 1999:
  - Puerta de Asturias Prize – Puerta de Asturias Association
- 2000:
  - Fitur Prize – Provincial Council of Tourism and Council of Seville
  - Working woman prize – Regional Government of Andalusia
  - Honorary mayoress – Council of Espinosa de Henares
  - "Peña Soleá" Homage – Council of Palma del Río
  - I Facyde Prize – Federation of Associations of Choirs and Dances of Spain
  - Honour Award – Indanza Associations of Almería
  - International presence prize – General Society of Spanish Authors (SGAE)
  - MAX to the Best Female Performer in Dance
  - Homage – XLIV Potaje de Utrera Festival
  - Homage by Peña "Juan Talega"
- 2001:
  - Casas Regionales Prize (Barcelona)
  - "Compás del Cante" Prize (Seville)
  - "Peña Juan Bernabé" Prize (Lebrija)
- 2002:
  - Nathwani Prize – Federation of European Cancer Societies
  - Biennial Prize of Flamenco to the best corps de ballet
- 2003:
  - Audience Award to the best flamenco performance (Canal Sur)
  - Member of honour of "FRIENDS" Association – Maison de la Danse-Lyon
  - National Flamenco Award – Flamencology Chair of Jerez
  - Honour award of Santa Bárbara Festival – California
  - Award of Great Theatre of Havana
- 2004:
  - MAX to the Best Female Performer in Dance
  - Escénica Prize – Foundation José Manuel Lara culture prizes
- 2005–2008:
  - Andalusia Tourism Prize: Embajadora de Andalucía (Ambassador of Andalusia)
  - Inauguration of a street with her name in Carrión de los Céspedes – Seville
  - Inauguration of a street with her name in Tomares - Seville
  - Member of the University Board for the Arts of the University of Alcalá de Henares
  - "Yerbabuena de Plata" Prize in Cabezas de San Juan – Seville
- 2009:
  - Medal of Villa of Paris – Council of Paris
- 2011:
  - Ambassador Prize of Tourism and Culture of Pekín – Council of Beijing, China

== Bibliography ==
- López del Castillo, Ángel y Lluch Hernández, Ana. Ánimo, p'alante!: Cristina Hoyos: Una mujer frente al cáncer de mama. Ediciones Mayo, Sevilla, 2205. ISBN 8496122999.
