= Workers' Front of Catalonia =

Workers' Front of Catalonia Front Obrer Català
- Founded: 1961
- Dissolved: 1970
- Headquarters: Barcelona
- Newspaper: Revolució (1961–62); Presencia Obrera (1964–65); Poder Obrero (1969)
- Ideology: Socialism; Anti-fascism; Catalanism; Liberation theology Anti-imperialism; Workers' self-management
- Political position: Left-wing to far-left
- National affiliation: Linked to the Popular Liberation Front.
- Colors: Red; Yellow

The Workers' Front of Catalonia (Catalan: Front Obrer de Catalunya, FOC) was a clandestine political movement in Catalonia, Spain, formed in 1961, and active during the Spanish State of caudillo Francisco Franco. It was the continuation of the Popular Democratic Association of Catalonia (Associació Democràtica Popular de Catalunya), one created by university students inspired by liberation theology and the Cuban revolution.

The party's abbreviation "FOC" corresponds to foc meaning "fire" in Catalan.

== History ==
FOC challenged the Unified Socialist Party of Catalonia (PSUC) over control of the growing Workers' Commissions (CC.OO). FOC established a hold over the Metalworkers' union, and thus had a lot of influence over the Barcelona Workers' Commission for a brief moment.

It aligned itself with the Popular Liberation Front (FLP) and the Euskadiko Sozialisten Batasuna (ESB). FOC published Revolució (1961-1962), Presencia Obrera (1964-1965) and Poder Obrero (1969). The party dissolved in 1970.

Pasqual Maragall, former head of government of Catalonia, was a leading member of FOC. Other leaders of FOC were Isidre Molas, Alfonso Carlos Comín, José Antonio González Casanova and Miquel Roca.
