= Jordi Camí =

- Occupation: Director General
- Organization: The Barcelona Biomedical Research Park (PRBB)
- Awards: Saint George's Cross of Government of Catalonia (2024)
- Website: https://jcami.eu/

Jordi Camí (Terrassa, 1952) is Emeritus Professor (specialist in Clinical Pharmacology) at Pompeu Fabra University, General Director of the Barcelona Biomedical Research Park (PRBB), and vice president of the Pasqual Maragall Foundation.

He has been the promoter and first director of the Pasqual Maragall Foundation between 2008 and 2020. His scientific activity has been focused on the field of Neurosciences (drug dependence, cognition), having explored other fields such as Bibliometry, Evaluation and Scientific Policy. His academic activity has been carried out between the Autonomous University of Barcelona (UAB) and the Pompeu Fabra University (UPF), having held the positions of Delegate of the Rector, Dean and Director of the department. At the UPF, he promoted Biology studies and the creation and development of the Department of Medicine and Life Sciences. He was the Director of the IMIM (Hospital del Mar Medical Research Institute) between 1985 and 2005. He has also participated in the creation of new research centers (CRG, CMRB and, in particular, the PRBB, which he founded and runs since 2005. He founded the no longer edited journal Quark (1995-2007).

In 2017 he was elected a full member of the Biological Sciences section of the Institute for Catalan Studies (Institut d’Estudis Catalans -IEC). Among the various awards won are the honorable mention of the Reina Sofia Research Award in 1990 and the Saint George's Cross, by the Government of Catalonia, for his relevant scientific and social work, and for his contributions to the improvement of the quality of life, in 2024. Among other institutions, from 2005 to 2012 he was a Member of the Health Advisory Council of the Social Ministry of Health of Spain and a member of its executive committee, and from 2007 to 2012 he was a member of the Bioethics Committee of Spain. He has also been the first President of CIR-CAT.
