= Euskadiko Sozialisten Batasuna =

Euskadiko Sozialisten Batasuna Basque Socialist Union
- President: José Ramón Recalde
- Founded: 1959
- Dissolved: 1969
- Ideology: Socialism; Antifascism; Basque nationalism Antiimperialism; Workers' self-management
- Political position: Left-wing
- National affiliation: Linked to the Popular Liberation Front (FELIPE).

The Euskadiko Sozialisten Batasuna (English: Basque Socialist Union, ESBA) was a clandestine political movement in the Southern Basque Country, Spain, formed in 1959, and active under Francoist Spain. It was the Basque sister organization of the Spanish Popular Liberation Front (FELIPE) and the Catalan Workers' Front of Catalonia (FOC).

== History ==
ESBA was founded in 1959, being heavily inspired by the Cuban revolution. In 1962 several militants of ESBA were arrested in San Sebastián, including their leader José Ramón Recalde. In 1965 Recalde was jailed again for refusing to pay a fine imposed for denouncing torture.

The group disappeared in 1969, due to police repression and to internal contradictions. Ex-ESBA members dispersed among many different organizations. Some former leaders of ESBA participated in the VI Assembly of ETA (1970), when most delegates approved an approach to revolutionary Marxism and the abandonment of the traditional nationalist thesis, splitting and creating the Liga Komunista Iraultzailea-ETA VI Assembly (LKI-ETA VI).
