= José Luis González Velarde =

José Luis González Velarde is a professor and researcher with the Tec de Monterrey, Monterrey Campus.

González Velarde's educational background consists of a bachelor's degree in mathematics from Tec de Monterrey, Campus Monterrey (1971), a master's degree in mathematics from the Centro de Investigación y de Estudios Avanzados del Instituto Politécnico Nacional (1973) (earned through a scholarship obtained from CONACYT), a master's degree in industrial engineering and operations research from the University of California, Berkeley (1978) and a doctorate in industrial engineering and operations research from the University of Texas, Austin (1990).

González Velarde primarily considers himself a researcher and even performs this work on his own time, rarely taking vacations. He has worked in this capacity with the Center for Quality and Manufacturing, School of Engineering at Campus Monterrey since 1990 and with the Cátedra de Investigación Tecnológico de Monterrey en Cadenas de Suministro since 2003. His specialties include computational optimization and algorithm design for logistics and manufacturing. He has participated in over 15,000 peer-reviewed publications in Spanish and English and has had his work published in journals such as IIE Transactions, Journal of Heuristics, Annals of OR, Computers and OR, Journal of Intelligent Manufacturing, EJOR, Transportation Science, Journal of the Operational Research Society, and Computers and Industrial Engineering.

However, he began his academic career as a teacher and is still involved in this activity. From 1973 to 1985 he was a professor in mathematics at the Universidad Autónoma de Nuevo León, then worked as an assistant instructor with the Department of Mechanical Engineering of the University of Texas, Austin from 1985 to 1990. Since joining the Tec de Monterrey in 1990, his teaching foci include production, manufacturing and logistics systems, and computational optimization at the graduate level, supervising more than thirty master's level theses and five doctorate level ones. Since the 1990s, he has also been a visiting professor in institutions such as Universidad del Norte de Barranquilla, the University of Colorado, the University of Texas and the Polytechnic University of Catalonia.

In addition to academic work, González Velardo has also worked on several reorganization and modernization projects such as those with Bancomer, De Acero, and Aeromexico in the 1990s and a project with the state of Nuevo León in 2008.

González Velarde has been noted for his work in Who's Who in Science and Engineering (2003-2004) and has received third place at the Premio Rómulo Garza de la Investigación y el Desarrollo Tecnológico (1993, 2001, 2010). He also has level II membership in Mexico's Sistema Nacional de Investigadores.

== Recent publications ==
- Hybrid Estimation of Distribution Algorithm for the Quay Crane Scheduling Problem

Co-Autores: Christopher Expósito Izquierdo, Belén Melián Batista, J. Marcos Moreno Vega. Applied Soft Computing (2013) Ms. Ref. No.: ASOC-D-12-00952R2.

- Randomized Heuristics for Handover Minimization in Mobility Networks. Journal of Heuristics (2013). Co-Autores: Luis F. Morán-Mirabal, Mauricio G. C. Resende, R. M. A. Silva. Acceptado, en prensa;
- Randomized Heuristics for the Family Traveling Salesperson Problem. International Transactions in Operational Research (2013) ISSN 0969-6016. Co-Autores: Luis F. Morán Mirabal, Mauricio G. C. Resende. Acceptado, en prensa;
- A metaheuristic algorithm to solve the selection of transportation channels in supply chain design. International Journal of Production Economics (2013). Co-Autores: : Elías Olivares, Roger Z. Ríos-Mercado. doi: 10.1016/j.ijpe.2013.01.017;
- GRASP Strategies for a Bi-objective Commercial Territory Design Problem. Journal of Heuristics, (2013), Vol. 19, No. 2, pp. 179–200, doi: 10.1007/s10732-011-9160-8. Co-Autores Ma. Angélica Salazar-Aguilar, Roger Z. Ríos-Mercado;
- Designing Routes for WEEE Collection: the vehicle routing problem with split loads and date windows. Journal of Heuristics, (2013), Vol. 19, No. 2, pp. 103–127, doi: 10.1007/s10732-011-9159-1. Co-Autores Julio Mar-Ortiz, B. Adenso-Díaz;
- A VNS algorithm for a disassembly cell formation problem with demand variability. European Journal of Industrial Engineering (2013). Co-Autores Julio Mar-Ortiz, Jose Luis González-Velarde, Belarmino Adenso-Díaz;
- Capacitated Fixed Cost Facility Location Problem with Transportation Choices. TOP (2012), Vol. 20, No. 3: 729–753, doi: 10.1007/s11750-010-0162-8. Co-Autores: Elías Olivares, Roger Z. Ríos-Mercado;
- A Divide-and-Conquer Approach to Commercial Territory Design. Computación y Sistemas (2012) Vol. 16 No.3, pp. 309–320. Co-Autores M. Angélica Salazar-Aguilar, Roger Z. Ríos-Mercado. ISSN 1405-5546;
- Multiobjective scatter search for a commercial territory design problem. Annals of Operations Research (2012) doi: 10.1007/s10479-011-1045-6. Vol 199, No 1, pp 343–360, 2012. Co-Autores M. Angélica Salazar-Aguilar, Roger Z. Ríos-Mercado, Julián Molina;
- A bi-objective programming model for designing compact and balanced territories in commercial districting. Transportation Research Part C, (2011), vol. 19, No. 5, pp. 885–895. Co-Autores: Ma. Angélica Salazar-Aguilar, Roger Z. Ríos-Mercado;
- Design of a Recovery Network for WEEE Collection: the case of Galicia, Spain.Journal of the Operational Research Society, (2011), Aug 2011. Vol. 62, No. 8; p. 1471 -1484. Co-Autores: Julio Mar-Ortiz, B. Adenso-Díaz;
- A Computational Tool for Optimizing the Urban Public Transport. Journal of Computer and System Sciences International, (2010), Vol. 49, No. 2, pp. 78–86

Co-Autores: Silvia Casado, Ada M.Alvarez, Joaquín Pacheco;

- On the optimal product assortment: comparing product with customer based strategies.

International Journal of Production Economics (2010), Vol. 125, No. 1, pp. 167–172. Co-Autores: Simme Douwe Flapper, Neale Smith, Luis Jacob Escobar;

== See also ==
List of Monterrey Institute of Technology and Higher Education faculty
