= Maria Rosa Virós i Galtier =

Spanish lawyer and academic

Maria Rosa Virós i Galtier (Barcelona, 1935 - May 15, 2010) was a Spanish lawyer, PhD in Law from the University of Barcelona and Professor of Political Sciences and Administration at the Pompeu Fabra University. She was the first female Rector of a Catalan University. In 2004, she received the President Macià Medal, instituted in 1938 by the Government of the Generalitat in recognition of the dedication, perseverance and spirit of initiative in her professional career. She married José Antonio González Casanova.
