= Pasqual Maragall Foundation =

Spanish non-profit foundation

- Fundació Pasqual Maragall
- Named after: Pasqual Maragall
- Formation: April 2008
- Founder: Pasqual Maragall
- Founded at: Barcelona
- Type: foundation
- Legal status: active
- Purpose: Alzheimer's disease research
- Headquarters: Pompeu Fabra University
- Location: Barcelona

The Pasqual Maragall Foundation is a private, non-profit foundation dedicated to scientific research of Alzheimer's disease. It was founded in April 2008 in Barcelona as a result of the public commitment of Pasqual Maragall, former Mayor of Barcelona and former President of the Generalitat de Catalunya, who had been diagnosed with this neurodegenerative disease in 2007. Its headquarters are located in the Ciutadella Campus of the Pompeu Fabra University in Barcelona.

Private and independent, the Pasqual Maragall Foundation counts on the economic support of partner enterprises and a network of associates and donors that make the project viable. Regarding its governing bodies, Dr. Jordi Camí is the director of the Foundation, Diana Garrigosa is the president and Pasqual Maragall, is the honorary president.

== Objectives ==
The Foundation’s objective is to promote scientific research in the field of Alzheimer’s disease, related neurodegenerative diseases and neuroscience in general. Another of its objectives is to provide technical support and advisory services, as well as transferring its knowledge in the areas that are specific to it. Another line of action included in its foundational mission is spreading the results of its scientific activities and involving society in relation to the knowledge obtained.

== The Barcelonaβeta Brain Research Center (BBRC) ==
The Barcelonaβeta Brain Research Center (BBRC) is a research center dedicated to the prevention of the Alzheimer’s Disease and the study of the cognitive functions affected in healthy and pathological aging. The Pasqual Maragall Foundation, with the support of the Pompeu Fabra University, was created it in 2012 and it’s currently directed by Dr. Arcadi Navarro.

The center’s mail activity is carried out in the Alzheimer’s Prevention Program, led by Dr. Jose Luís Molinuevo. The program focuses on the pre-clinical phase of the disease, characterized by a series of changes in the brain that can start up to 20 years before the onset of the symptoms, and on the prodromal phase, which occurs when the first symptoms of cognitive impairment appear, but the affected person continues being independent on a day-to-day basis. The program it’s structured in two research groups that collaborate closely from a clinical, cognitive, genetic and biomarker and neuroimaging perspective.

- Alfa Study: To identify the early physiopathological events in Alzheimer’s disease and develop primary and secondary prevention programs, the BBRC launched the Alfa Study, together with the Pasqual Maragall Foundation and thanks to support of “la Caixa”. The Alfa Study is a research platform made by 2.700 participants without cognitive alterations, dedicated to the early detection and prevention of Alzheimer’s disease. The participants are between 45 and 71 years old, and majorly descendants of people with Alzheimer’s disease, so the cohort is enriched with genetic factors related to the disease.
- Research Projects: The BBRC has several international studies and collaborations, majorly dedicated to the early detection and prevention of Alzheimer’s disease. The Alfa Study +, the Barcelonaβeta Dementia Prevention Research Clinic, the Alfa Genetics, the European Prevention of Alzheimer’s Dementia (EPAD), the Amyloid Imaging to Prevent Alzheimer’s Disease (AMYPAD) and TRIBEKA are some of the research projects that are carried out.
- Clinical trials: The BBRC works with the pharmaceutical industry and with public-private projects in Alzheimer’s clinical research in order to test drugs that succeed to avoid or delay the onset of the disease. Clinical trials for the prevention of Alzheimer’s disease with companies such as Novartis, Araclon Blotech and Janssen are being or have been carried out in their facilities.

The BBRC shares its headquarters with the Pasqual Maragall Foundation, at 30 Wellington Street in Barcelona, in the Ciutadella Campus of the Pompeu Fabra University. Inaugurated in 2016, its facilities include a state-of-the-art 3T magnetic resonance dedicated exclusively to research, and the personnel and equipment necessary to carry out clinical trials in human research. The BBRC‘s Neuroimaging Platform offers the scientific community personalized integral service to execute research projects that take into account the acquisition, management and processing of cerebral images by magnetic resonance.
