= José Antonio González i Casanova =

Spanish lawyer, politician, academic, and writer (1935–2021)

- Born: 2 December 1935; Barcelona, Spain
- Died: 29 October 2021 (aged 85)
- Occupation(s): Lawyer, politician, writer

José Antonio González i Casanova (2 December 1935 – 29 October 2021) was a Spanish lawyer, politician, constitutional law academic, and writer, known for being one of the drafters of the Spanish Constitution in 1978.

== Biography and career ==
González was born in Barcelona, Spain, in 1935. He studied at the local elite school "Jesuïtes Sarrià", where he met Alfonso Carlos Comín. Despite coming from a national Catholic family and having a military uncle who was shot for being part of the Civil War Nationalist cause, during Franco's regime González was part of the Popular Liberation Front, a left-wing, clandestine and anti-Francoist organization. Later, he co-founded the clandestine Workers' Front of Catalonia (FOC) in 1962.

After graduating in law from the University of Barcelona, Manuel Jiménez de Parga hired González to be an assistant professor of political law at the university. He received his doctorate in 1963, with his thesis entitled "The people's committee of the Yugoslavian commune". In 1967, he became chair of the political law department at the University of Santiago de Compostela. At that time, he collaborated with the newspaper La Voz de Galicia.

In 1970, after the dissolution of FOC, González joined the Socialist Party of Catalonia-Congress (PSC–Congrés), and later, the Socialists' Party of Catalonia (PSC). Returning to Barcelona in the early 1970s, he was appointed Professor of State Theory at the University of Barcelona and later became a Professor of Constitutional Law there as well, remaining in those roles until 2006, when he was named the university's ombudsman.

In the first free elections of 1977, González was part of the PSC candidacy, but in the end they did not count on him. In the first legislature, he was one of the constitutionalist experts that the PSOE consulted to elaborate its project of Constitution. Alfonso Guerra, then deputy, told him in one of the sessions of the report that drafted that document that "Gregorio Peces-Barba is in complete agreement with your opinions and will take them into account, especially in the autonomic system". González was very much in favor of the decentralization of State power as a way of "bringing power closer to the people", while rejecting the proposal of the State government's right of veto over the laws arising from the regional parliaments. He also participated in drafting the Statute of Autonomy of Catalonia of 1979 and collaborated in drafting the Statutes of Autonomy of the Basque Country in 1979 and Galicia in 1981.

González was appointed member of the Council of Statutory Guarantees of Catalonia in 1981, a position he held until 2001 when he was succeeded by Pere Jover.

In 1983, the PSOE nominated González as a candidate for judge in the Constitutional Court in the first stage of the body's activity, but Manuel Fraga's People's Party (PP) rejected him for being too "autonomist". Miquel Roca mediated, but was unsuccessful. He was nominated a second time, but again the PP rejected his nomination.

In 2007, González was sued by the PP for libel and slander after he published an article in El País entitled "ETA and PP, the suicidal couple" in which he criticized the attitude of the PP after the ETA bombings in Barajas in 2006. In 2015, he criticized the 2010 Constitutional Court ruling on the new Catalan Statute, saying that "they have led to close the doors of dialogue between the Spanish State and Catalonia". In that interview, he also criticized the Spanish transition to democracy, maintaining that it did not bring about "radical change".

== Personal life and death ==
He married Maria Rosa Virós i Galtier, the first female rector of a Catalan university who died in 2010 following a long illness. With her, he had a daughter, Itziar González i Virós, who was a councilor in the City Council of Barcelona.

González Casanova died on 29 October 2021 at age 85 after suffering a stroke two weeks earlier.

== Selected works ==
This list includes some of González Casanova's best-known works:

- Comunicación humana y comunicación política (1968)
- Federalisme i autonomia a Catalunya (1868-1938) (1974)
- La lucha por la democracia en España (1975)
- La lucha por la democracia en Catalunya (1979)
- Teoría del estado y derecho constitucional (1981)
- Dictadores, dictaduras (1981)
- Las Diputaciones provinciales en España (1986)
- El cambio inacabable (1975-1985) (1986)
- Con el paso del tiempo: del sentimiento al sentido (1990)
- El Dios presente: confesiones de un viejo cristiano (2009)
- La derecha contra el Estado. El liberalismo autoritario en España 1833-2008 (2009)
- Memorias de un socialista indignado (2015)

== Honors and awards ==
- Premio Mundo-79 (1979)
- Creu de Sant Jordi (2010)
- Golden Medal of the City of Barcelona (2012)
- XIV Premio Gaziel (2015)
