= Espinosa de Henares =

Espinosa de Henares, Spain
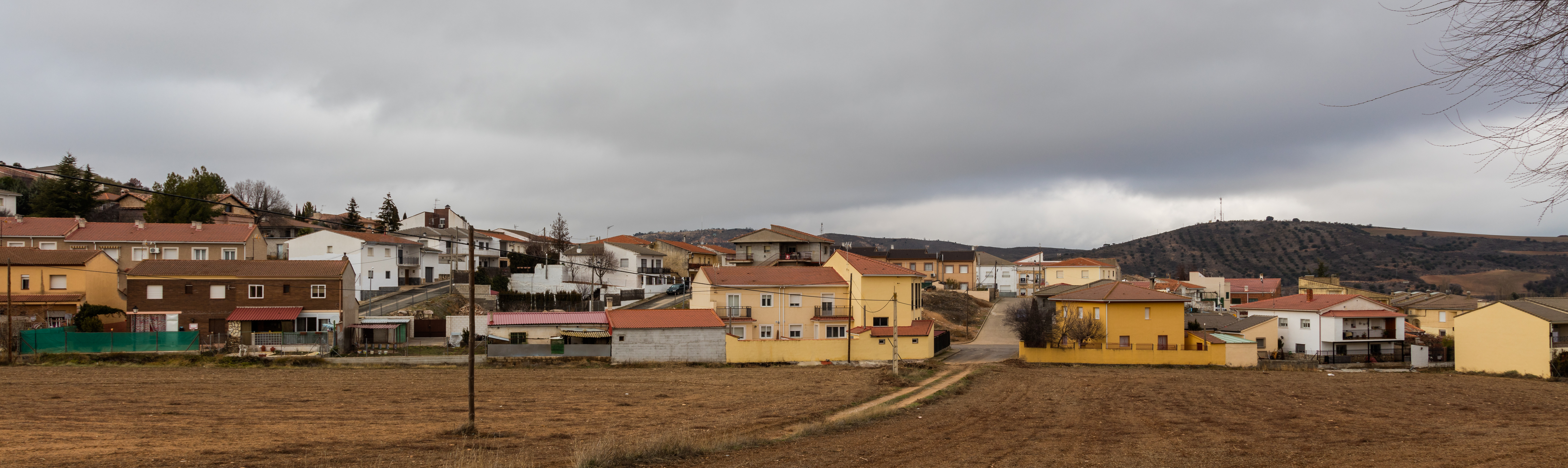

- Coat of arms

- Location within Province of Guadalajara Location within Castilla-La Mancha Location within Spain
- Coordinates: 40°54′20″N 3°04′14″W
- Country: Spain
- Autonomous community: Castile-La Mancha
- Province: Guadalajara
- Municipality: Espinosa de Henares

Area
  - Total: 39 km^{2} (15 sq mi)
- Elevation: 761 m (2,497 ft)

Population (2025-01-01)
  - Total: 715
  - Density: 18/km^{2} (47/sq mi)
- Time zone: UTC+1 (CET)
  - Summer (DST): UTC+2 (CEST)

Espinosa de Henares is a municipality located in the province of Guadalajara, Castile-La Mancha, Spain. According to the 2004 census (INE), the municipality has a population of 631 inhabitants.

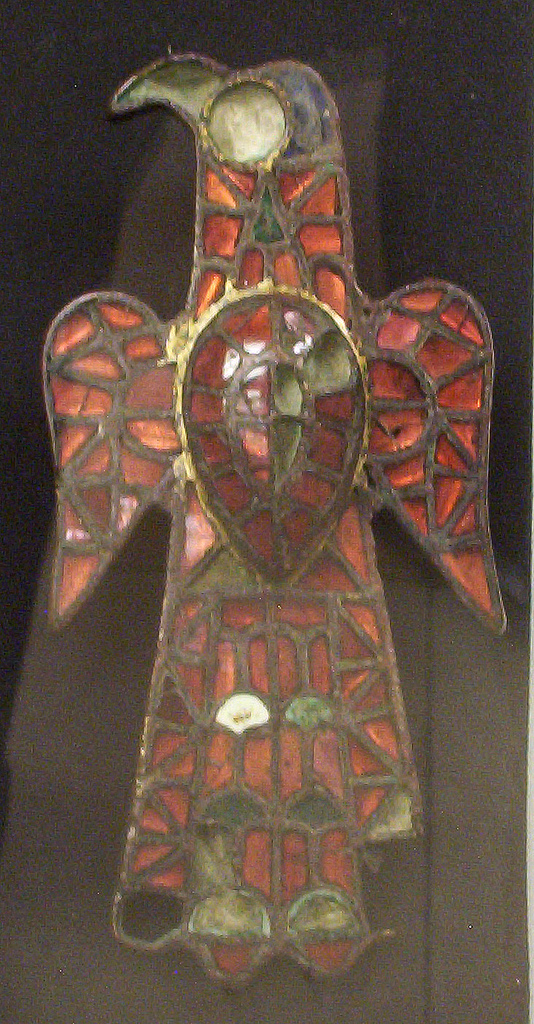
6th-century eagle-shaped Visigoth fibula from Espinosa de Henares.
