= Los invertidos =

Play by José González Castillo

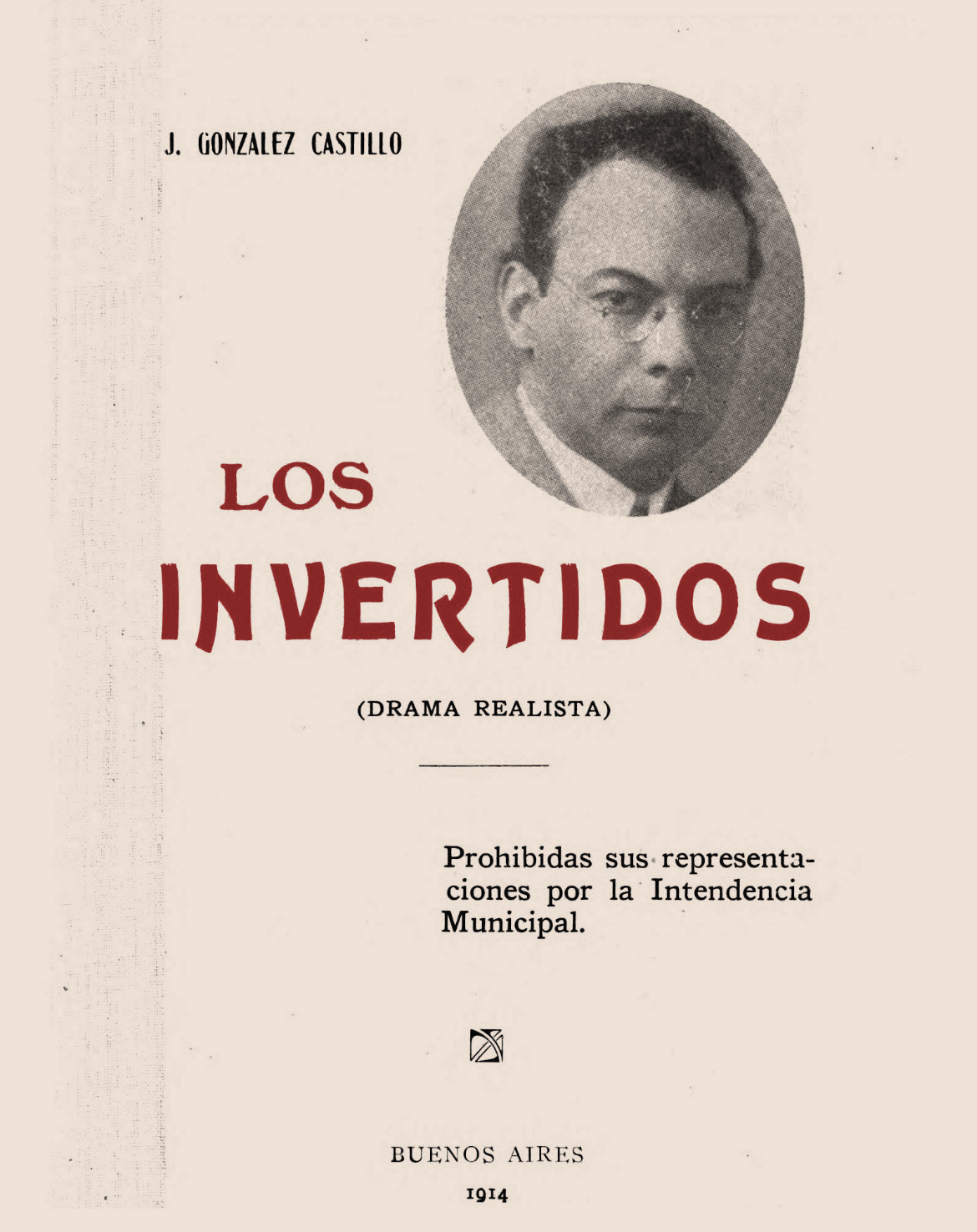
- Cover for Los Invertidos
- Original language: Spanish
- Written by: José González Castillo
- Characters: Doctor Flórez, Clara, Julián, and Pérez
- Subject: Homosexuality

Premiere
- Date: September 23, 1914
- Place: Buenos Aires, Argentina

Los invertidos (The Inverts; invert was an early term for homosexuality) is a play by Argentine author José González Castillo that premiered on September 23, 1914.

== Context ==
At the end of the 19th century in Argentina, the anarchists, much like the socialists, had launched efforts to educate the lower classes. The goals were both educational and propagandistic. Some examples include work by the Sociedad Luz and Roberto Payró, and Alberto Ghiraldo and Florencio Sánchez, for the anarchists and socialists, respectively. The plays they used were typically short and simple (although they also used works by Ibsen and Tolstoy) and were not usually performed on the commercial circuit.

José González Castillo was an author with anarchist tendencies who wrote "una tesis filosófica, política o moral, intentando convencer al público acerca de su legitimidad, invitándole a recurrir más a su racionalidad que a su emotividad (A Political or Moral Philosophical Thesis Intended to Convince the Public of its Legitimacy, Inviting it to Appeal More to its Rationality than its Emotivity). In this work, his goal was to demonstrate the evils of the upper classes—the aristocracy and the bourgeoisie–as "corruptors" of the proletariat. He employs a rhetorical device that is frequently used in the era's anarchist literature, in which homosexuality is presented as the worst form of corruption, even a form of vampirism, and as a terrible secret. This framing, along with the use of "scandal", as has been similarly employed by Tennessee Williams, opposes the use of bourgeois theatrical naturalism, in which the "moral" danger originates from the poorer classes.

The play premiered in Buenos Aires and the subsequent scandal resulted in it being censored on the grounds of immorality. It was the first play to be performed in Argentina that had homosexuality as its primary subject matter.

== Plot ==
The plot centers on an upper-class family, consisting of Doctor Flórez, his wife Clara, and their son, Julián. The family lives a happy and well-ordered life until Clara receives a visit from Pérez, a "close friend" of Flórez who is a part of the doctor's "other life", which he visits at night, and of which his wife is unaware. Pérez makes Clara a "dishonest proposition" and invites her to his home. Clara accepts because the theatrical conventions of the time allow that a married woman can have a short, discreet affair, this is not a source public scandal as long as she confesses to her husband.

In Pérez's apartment, Clara is uncomfortable, a feeling that stems from the strange and ornate, "Wildean" style. Pérez says to her:

This is my garçonnière, as the French say ... No one comes in here but me, and all this, which seems so feminine, is nothing more than the level of refinement with which I like to live, creating the illusion that, sad and alone, there is in this bachelor pad a feminine, delicate, and cultured spirit, like your own, that surrounds everything, that orders it and rules it.

When Clara is about to fall into Pérez's arms, several "ambiguous" young men turn up. Their conversation with Pérez makes Clara see the hard reality that this is a homosexual club and Pérez is its leader. Horrified and disgusted, she flees the house.

Upon returning home, Clara discovers through a letter that the homosexual relationship between Pérez and Flórez began when they were both children. After discussing the issue with the servants, who are familiar with the subject and do not seem surprised, she hears Pérez arrive with Flórez and hears them whispering in the dark; Pérez seems to be dominant over the effeminate Flórez. Clara turns on the light and shoots Pérez with a revolver, killing him. She immediately hands the gun to her husband in an effort to salvage some familial dignity, and, his secret revealed, Flórez kills himself. Their son, Julián, only hears the gunshot and hugs his mom, who faints in his arms.

== Analysis ==
Homosexuality is presented as an unforgivable perversion, without any other consideration. It is not a sickness or a defect (which was a widespread belief at the time), rather it is simply considered a type of evil that does not deserve pity. What unites Pérez and Flórez is that they have taken advantage of their social positions to pervert young, working-class men. The servants, from the lower class, accept homosexuality as something that is a part of city life, but Clara cannot accept it. The name "Clara" itself is an intentional choice (from the Spanish claro for "clear") and relates to how the author brings "clarity" to the sordid world in which her husband operates, "cleaning" the "filthiness". Both Alberto Mira and Osvaldo Bazán in their book Historia de la homosexualidad en la Argentina (History of Homosexuality in Argentina) see clear homophobic intentions in the work, in which the moral condemnation against "inverts" could not be stronger. There is evidence for this interpretation in the play itself as in a scene in which the medical examiner confirms, "Additionally ... there is a secret law ... strange, fatal, which always gives these people their due, tragically eliminated, when life weighs on them like a burden ... shamelessly unrepentant ... suicide es 'their end, their good evolution' as Verlaine would say," a typical opinion for the time, in which homosexuals always face tragic ends in literary works. However, there is also evidence in support of other assertions by González Castillo, in that it makes clear that he considers homosexuality to be a sickness, a repugnant and awful vice. In the statement of defense sent to the Buenos Aires City Council that he wrote to avoid the play being banned, he defends its moral character, insisting that the play's intention was "to inspire repugnance for these tragic individuals that debauchery has reduced from the level of men".

A second, less severe interpretation suggests that the play is not a criticism of Flórez's homosexuality, but of the hypocrisy of bourgeois society that forces him to play a role that he does not want. The theater director Mariano Dossena, for example, believes that heterosexuality (represented by Clara) is what has killed Flórez. Writer Jorge Salessi insinuates this with his question: "Why does this woman kill?" In fact, it would have been a strong condemnation of homosexuality if Flórez had committed suicide after seeing his own "depravity", without intervention at the hands of his heterosexual wife. The scene with the "ambiguous" young men is also cheerful and free of condemnation, in keeping with the opinion of the lower classes who simply shrug their shoulders when faced with homosexuality. This interpretation leaves open the contradiction between González Castillo's explicit words and a supposed defense (or neutral attitude) towards homosexuality.

== Bibliography ==
- Mira, Alberto (1999). "Invertidos, Los (1914)". Para entendernos. Diccionario de cultura homosexual, gay y lésbica (To Understand Ourselves. Dictionary of Gay, Lesbian, and Homosexual Culture). Barcelona: Libros de la Tempestad. p. 415. ISBN 84-7948-038-6.
