= Pasqual Maragall =

Catalan politician

The Right Honourable Pasqual Maragall Olympic Order
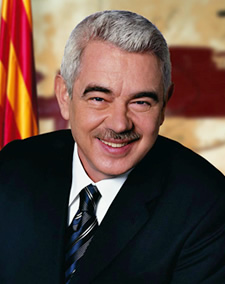
- Official portrait, 2004

127th President of the Government of Catalonia
- In office 20 December 2003 – 28 November 2006
- Monarch: Juan Carlos I
- First Minister: Josep-Lluís Carod-Rovira (2003–2004); Josep Bargalló (2004–2006)
- Preceded by: Jordi Pujol
- Succeeded by: José Montilla

114th Mayor of Barcelona
- In office 1 December 1982 – 26 September 1997
- Preceded by: Narcís Serra
- Succeeded by: Joan Clos

Leader of the Opposition in the Parliament of Catalonia
- In office 16 November 1999 – 17 December 2003
- Preceded by: Joaquim Nadal
- Succeeded by: Artur Mas (Office suspended between 17 December 2003 and 27 May 2004)

President of the Barcelona'92 Olympic Organising Committee
- In office 2 October 1988 – 9 August 1992
- IOC President: Juan Antonio Samaranch
- Preceded by: Park Seh-jik
- Succeeded by: Billy Payne

Chair of the Barcelona'92 Olympic Organising Committee
- In office 12 March 1987 – 15 September 1992
- Preceded by: Committee established
- Succeeded by: Position dissolved

Personal details
- Born: 13 January 1941 (age 85) Barcelona, Spain
- Party: Socialists' Party of Catalonia (since 1978)
- Other political affiliations: Workers' Front of Catalonia (1960s); Socialist Convergence of Catalonia (1974–1976); Socialist Party of Catalonia–Congress (1976–1978)
- Spouse: Diana Garrigosa (1965-2020; her death)
- Children: Two daughters and a son
- Occupation: Politician

Pasqual Maragall Mira (Catalan pronunciation: [pəsˈkwal məɾəˈɣaʎ]; born 13 January 1941) is a Spanish retired politician and former President of Generalitat de Catalunya. He had previously been Mayor of Barcelona, from 1982 to 1997, and helped run the city's successful Olympic bid.

== Early life and education ==
He was born in Barcelona in 1941 as the third of eight siblings. His grandfather was the Catalan poet Joan Maragall. In 1965, he married Diana Garrigosa, and he has two daughters and a son. He was an active member of the Workers' Front of Catalonia and joined the left-wing anti-Franco movement Popular Liberation Front. He studied law and economics at the University of Barcelona between 1957 and 1964.

In 1965, after his studies, he joined the Specialist Office of Barcelona City Council as an economist, a position he combined with giving classes in economic theory at the Autonomous University of Barcelona, acting as assistant to the professor, Josep M. Bricall. He also cooperated with the Studies Service of the Banco Urquijo, run by Ramon Trias Fargas.

Between 1971 and 1973, he lived in New York City, where he earned a Master of Arts in economics from The New School.

== Beginnings in politics ==
In 1973, he came back to Barcelona and returned to the Barcelona City Council and to the UAB, where he gave classes on urban economics and international economics as a temporary assistant lecturer. One year earlier, he supported the Socialist Convergence of Catalonia and his succeeding party PSC-C, one of the founding groups of the PSC. In 1978, at the Economics Faculty of the UAB, he presented his doctoral thesis The prices of urban land, The case of Barcelona (1948–1978). In 1978, he was a researcher and guest professor at the Johns Hopkins University in Baltimore. This university would later appoint him doctor honoris causa.

== First elections ==
He joined the PSC electoral list in the first democratic municipal election for Barcelona City Council in 1979, and this party won the most votes at the ballot box. His friend Narcís Serra became Mayor while he became tinent d'alcalde (Deputy Mayor) for Administrative Reform, and later for Taxation. On 1 December 1982 he succeeded Narcís Serra as Mayor of Barcelona, since Serra was appointed minister of Defence by the new Socialist government of Felipe González.

In 1986, Barcelona was chosen to host the 1992 Summer Olympics. Accordingly, the city's mayor – Pasqual Maragall – presided over the organising committee (COOB'92). The Olympics provided the city with sorely needed infrastructure. Another Maragall initiative, the 2004 Universal Forum of Cultures, exhibited the same "top-down" approach. It is widely recognised, however, that the '92 Games helped Barcelona to redefine itself as one of the great cities of Europe.

From 1991 to 1997, he was President of the Council of Municipalities and Regions of Europe. He was also Vice-President of the International Union of Local Authorities and President of the Committee of the Regions of the European Union from 1996 to 1998.

== Recent years ==
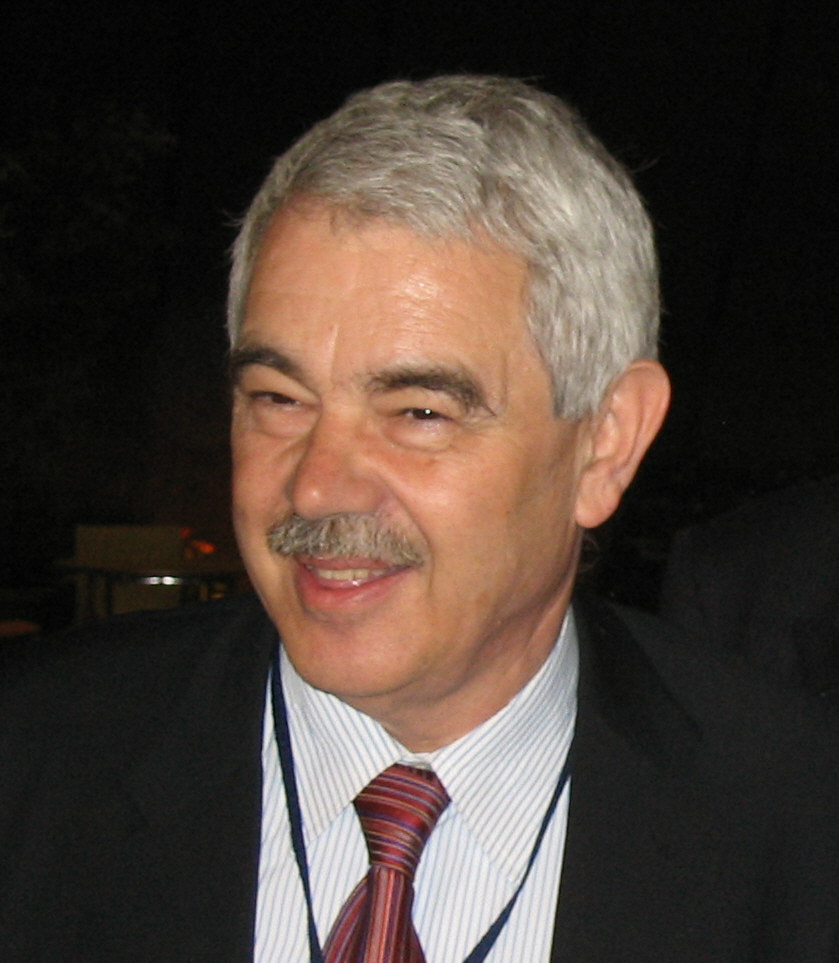

In 1997, Pasqual Maragall resigned as Barcelona's mayor and returned to university lecturing in Rome and New York City. Two years later, he came back to active politics and was elected as the PSC-CpC candidate for the presidency of the Generalitat in the 1999 election.

In 2000, he was elected President of the Partit dels Socialistes de Catalunya (PSC-PSOE), and was a member of the Catalan Parliament from 1988 to 1995. From 1999 to 2003, he presided over the PSC-CpC parliamentary group.

On 16 December 2003, Maragall was elected President of the Generalitat by the Catalan Parliament after cliff-hanger negotiations with the ERC and ICV parties. He finally took office on 20 December. While generally popular as Mayor of Barcelona, Maragall's career as President of the coalition government was marked by a series of crises. A particularly severe one involved Chief Councilor Carod's "secret" trip to France to unofficially negotiate with ETA. Others include the stormy negotiations over a new Statute of Autonomy for Catalonia in which Maragall and the PSC hovered between a nationalist stance and giving in to the central government pressure; the collapse of an entire city block in Barcelona's Carmel district following poorly planned and executed tunnelling work; and a scheme – supported by Maragall's government – to build a tunnel for the AVE high-speed train under the shaky foundations of Barcelona's 19th-century city centre. In October 2005, Maragall met with objections regarding his plans for reshuffling the cabinet without consulting either his coalition partners or his party. The President's brother, Ernest Maragall, was tipped for a ministerial post in the reshuffle. Ernest, who held the post of Executive Secretary, was seen by critics as an apparatchik, and whipped up a storm of protest in June 2005 when he opposed plans to make Catalonia's future anti-fraud department independent of the government. Pasqual Maragall's pledges to fight corruption and nepotism in public administration were one of the key planks in his 2003 campaign.

On 21 June 2006, Maragall announced that he would not be standing for reelection (see 2006 Catalan Parliament election). He offered his support to new President José Montilla amongst controversy over Montilla's non-Catalan heritage, stating that it did not make Catalonia "less Catalan", and later commented that "our new homeland is Europe". He later stated, "our new path is the Mediterranean". On 19 October 2007, it was announced that he would not pay his PSOE membership fee anymore, ending three decades of activity within the party. The following day, he announced that he had been diagnosed with Alzheimer's disease and that he was creating the Pasqual Maragall Foundation to fight against the illness.

In 2007 he founded the Catalunya Europa Foundation, which develops work inspired by the thought and political work of Maragall, including the active involvement of Catalan society in a more united Europe, the global role of cities as spaces for social transformation, and lasting dialogue between Catalonia, Spain and Europe.

In 2017, a collection of essays edited by Jaume Claret, Pasqual Maragall: Pensament i acció, was published by RBA Libros. Academics and colleagues of the politician discuss the essential points of his career: the city and the region, his vision of Catalonia's place in Spain and in the world, government policies and the 1992 Olympic Games, among others.

In 2020, a documentary film directed by Josep M. Mañé and Francesca Català, Maragall i la Lluna, was released. The documentary starts with the experience of Lluna, a girl who was eight years old when, in 1993, the then-mayor of Barcelona moved into her home to better understand the reality of the Roquetes neighborhood. Twenty-five years later, Lluna begins a search that starts with the memory of those days and leads her to discover Maragall through family members, acquaintances and politicians.

Political offices
| Preceded by Jordi Pujol | President of the Government of Catalonia; 2003 – 2006 | Succeeded by José Montilla |
| Preceded by Narcís Serra | Mayor of Barcelona; 1982–1997 | Succeeded by Joan Clos |
Assembly seats
| Preceded by Joaquim Nadal | Leader of the Opposition in the Parliament of Catalonia; 1999–2003 | Succeeded by Artur Mas |
Party political offices
| Preceded by Raimon Obiols | President of PSC; 2000 – 2007 | Succeeded by José Montilla |
Sporting positions
| Preceded by (South Korea) Park Seh-jik | President of Organizing Committee for Summer Olympic Games; 1992 | Succeeded by (United States) Billy Payne |
