= Ziffren =

Ziffren is a surname. Notable people with the surname include:

- Ken Ziffren (born 1940), American entertainment lawyer
- Lester Ziffren (1906–2007), American reporter and screenwriter
- Paul Ziffren (1913–1991), American sports administrator
