= M. Angélica Salazar Aguilar =

Mexican operations researcher

María Angélica Salazar Aguilar (born 1981) is a Mexican computer scientist and operations researcher specializing in heuristics for multi-objective optimization in transportation planning and sales territory design. She is a professor at the Autonomous University of Nuevo León, in the School of Mechanical and Electrical Engineering.

== Education and career ==
Salazar earned a computer engineering degree from the Querétaro Institute of Technology in 2004. She went to the Autonomous University of Nuevo León for graduate study in systems engineering, earning a master's degree and a PhD. Her 2010 doctoral dissertation, Models, Algorithms, and Heuristics for Multiobjective Commercial Territory Design, was supervised by Roger Z. Ríos-Mercado.

She did postdoctoral research in Canada at the University of Montreal, in the Centre Interuniversitaire de Recherche sur les Réseaux d'Entreprise, la Logistique et le Transport (CIRRELT), before returning to the Autonomous University of Nuevo León as a faculty member.

== Recognition ==
Salazar is a member of the Mexican Academy of Sciences.
