= Enrique el cojo =

Spanish dancer (1912–1985)

Enrique Jiménez (or Giménez) Mendoza, known as Enrique "el Cojo" (the Cripple), (March 31, 1912 – March 29, 1988) was a flamenco dancer, choreographer, and teacher born in Cáceres, Extremadura, Spain. He grew up in Sevilla, in the region of Andalucía.

== Early life ==
Enrique wanted to be a dancer from a young age, but at the age of eight, developed a tumor in his leg that left him crippled, with one leg shorter than the other. He worked in photography, before pursuing dancing. When it came to dancing, he was not able to do certain demanding moves, such as turns, due to his leg. Instead, he worked out ways to give the feel of a move, without the physical demands.

== Career ==
Enrique el Cojo taught for many years in a small studio on the side street, Espiritu Santo. Among his students were the famous dancers Lola Flores, Cristina Hoyos, Manuela Vargas, and Carmen Ledesma. Students came from as far away as Japan to study with him.

Enrique acted and danced in a film production La Carmen, directed by Julio Diamente.

Author:	José Luis Ortiz Nuevo
Publisher:	Sevilla Portada Editorial 1984, Second edition, 2017, Sevilla Athenaica Edicion Universitarias.

Author:	K Meira Goldberg; Ninotchka Bennahum; Michelle Heffner Hayes
Publisher:	Jefferson, North Carolina : McFarland & Company, Inc., Publishers, 2015.
