= José Antonio González Mata =

Mexican politician

- Born: 23 July 1975 (age 50); Mexico City, Mexico
- Occupation: Politician
- Political party: PRD

José Antonio González Mata (born 23 July 1975) is a Mexican politician from the Party of the Democratic Revolution. In 2012 he served as Deputy of the LXI Legislature of the Mexican Congress representing the Federal District.
