= Jose Luis Gonzalez (artist) =

Mexican-American artist (born 1939)

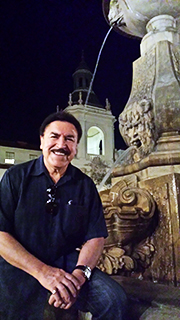
- Gonzalez in March 2015
- Born: 1939 (age 86–87); Aguascalientes, Aguascalientes, Mexico
- Education: East Los Angeles College
- Occupation: Artist
- Years active: 1957–present

Jose Luis Gonzalez (born 1939), also known as J.L. Goez and Joe L. Gonzalez, is a Mexican American restorer, designer, painter, muralist, sculptor, ceramist, appraiser, importer, and arts administrator.

== Background ==
Gonzalez was the first born of a father from Jalisco, Mexico and mother from Arizona, United States. Born in 1939, in Aguascalientes, Mexico, Jose Luis arrived in Los Angeles, California with his mother in 1947. Shortly thereafter, his father and his siblings started a new life in Los Angeles, California.

Jose Luis first attended Pio Pico Elementary School in Pico Rivera, later Malabar Street School in East Los Angeles. At the age of 9, he was enrolled in Assumption Catholic School; graduated, then entered Don Bosco Technical Institute in Rosemead. His class was the first graduating class in 1959.

In 1957, at the age of 17, he was hired as an apprentice under Eddie Fusek at Fusek's Religious Art Studio, and performed projects, creating crosses, restoring religious statues, etc. He attended East Los Angeles College, studied under Olinto Marcucci Ramirez, Rudolf Vargas, Professor Aldana, Angel Hernandez, and was personal friend of the famed Rufino Tamayo.

Gonzalez has created numerous murals, shrines, monuments and restorations. He received a City of Los Angeles Certificate of Service for his chairmanship of the Los Angeles City Bicentennial Committee from Mayor Tom Bradley on September 28, 1976. He received the Bronze Medallion of Mexico City from Mayor Carlos Hank Gonzalez in 1981 for his contributions toward the Mexico City and Los Angeles Sister City project. In 1984 Peter Ueberroth, President of the Olympic Committee, along with Harry Usher and Paul Ziffren, presented him a Certificate and Bronze Medal for his contributions to the success of the 23rd Olympiad held in Los Angeles known also as the 1984 Summer Olympics.

Gonzalez was sentenced to five years probation in 1983 after admitting to a federal felony charge related to this enrollment in a federal jobs program for the needy and subsequently being paid thousands of dollars for work he didn't do. The program was administered by The East Los Angeles Community Union (TELACU), a social service non-profit. Gonzalez was also paid at least $458,000 by TELACU for contracts awarded to his art companies at the same time he was serving as vice chair of its board of directors, which was cited as a possible conflict of interest by the U.S. Department of Labor, Office of Inspector General.

== Notable points in career ==
- Founded Goez Imports and Fine Arts in 1969 to assist and promote Chicano and Mexican artists, to bring about a cultural awareness while beautifying the community through murals and fine arts.
- As project director and art director contributed greatly towards the creation and installation of the mural, The Birth of Our Art designed by Jose Luis Gonzalez's brother, Juan Gonzalez and assisted in design by Robert Arenivar, Ignacio Gomez and David Botello. This mural was installed onto the facade of the Goez Art Studio in 1971.
- A History of Our Struggle graced the store front of First Street Store, East Los Angeles (1974) The mural measured 1,123 square feet total, 17 of the murals were designed by Robert Arenivar with the contributions of Jose Luis Gonzalez as project director, art director and historian, and Juan Gonzalez, and David Botello; while two center panels were designed by David Botello.
- Dewar's Profile, "Published November 1, 2014 at 1203 × 1674 in Dewars Whisky Ads and Posters" The ad appeared in numerous national magazines and newspapers in 1975.
- "Goez Art Studio's mural at the Centro Maravilla Service Center, 1975, offers a glimpse of early Los Angeles life. The 8' h x 60' w mural is divided into three panels, each portraying a different historical scene of life along Brooklyn Avenue in the community of Maravilla. Maravilla was one of the earliest settlements in East Los Angeles, which was originally home to those fleeing religious persecution in Mexico."
- In 1978, Jose Luis Gonzalez designed a ceramic tile mural that included a decorative border feature surrounding the City Terrace Library titled Ofrenda Maya – Mayan Offering located at 4025 City Terrace Drive, Los Angeles CA 90063. LA County Arts Commission - Civic Art Active Projects
- Jose Luis Gonzalez designed and executed the official Olympic Mural for the 23rd Olympiad, titled Bienvenidos a la Ciudad de Nuestra Senora La Reina de Los Angeles de Porciuncula held in Los Angeles July 1984. The mural 45' high by 100' wide located across the street from the Los Angeles Coliseum was painted with the assistance of Robert Arenivar, his son, Manny Gonzalez, Bernie Granados, Javier Vargas, Armando de la Cruz, and Tony Ramirez.
- Gonzalez was the Project Director and Head Sculptor for the City of Hope project in Duarte, California, in 1988. It was a two-year project which entailed the construction of a shrine for a 7' tall hand-carved marble statue of "La Virgen de Guadalupe – A Gift of Hope".
- In 1988, Gonzalez was commissioned by Time magazine to create a mural which had the likeness of actor Edward James Olmos as a rising star. "The mural was commissioned for use on the cover of Time for the July 11, 1988, issue."
- A Mayan warrior depicted as one of many murals throughout the exterior and interior of a popular shopping, cultural, and restaurant center El Mercado de Los Ángeles, on First and Lorena Streets in Los Angeles, completed in 1990. Mosaic tile.
- In 1991. Gonzalez created the mural work, "Building the Future", which is located in the Salesian Boys and Girls Club on Wabash Avenue in East Los Angeles. "In the foreground students are immersed in educational pursuits. Behind them and across a bridge stands a shiny downtown with Mother Nature looking on."
