= Diana Garrigosa =

Catalan economist and teacher (1944–2020)

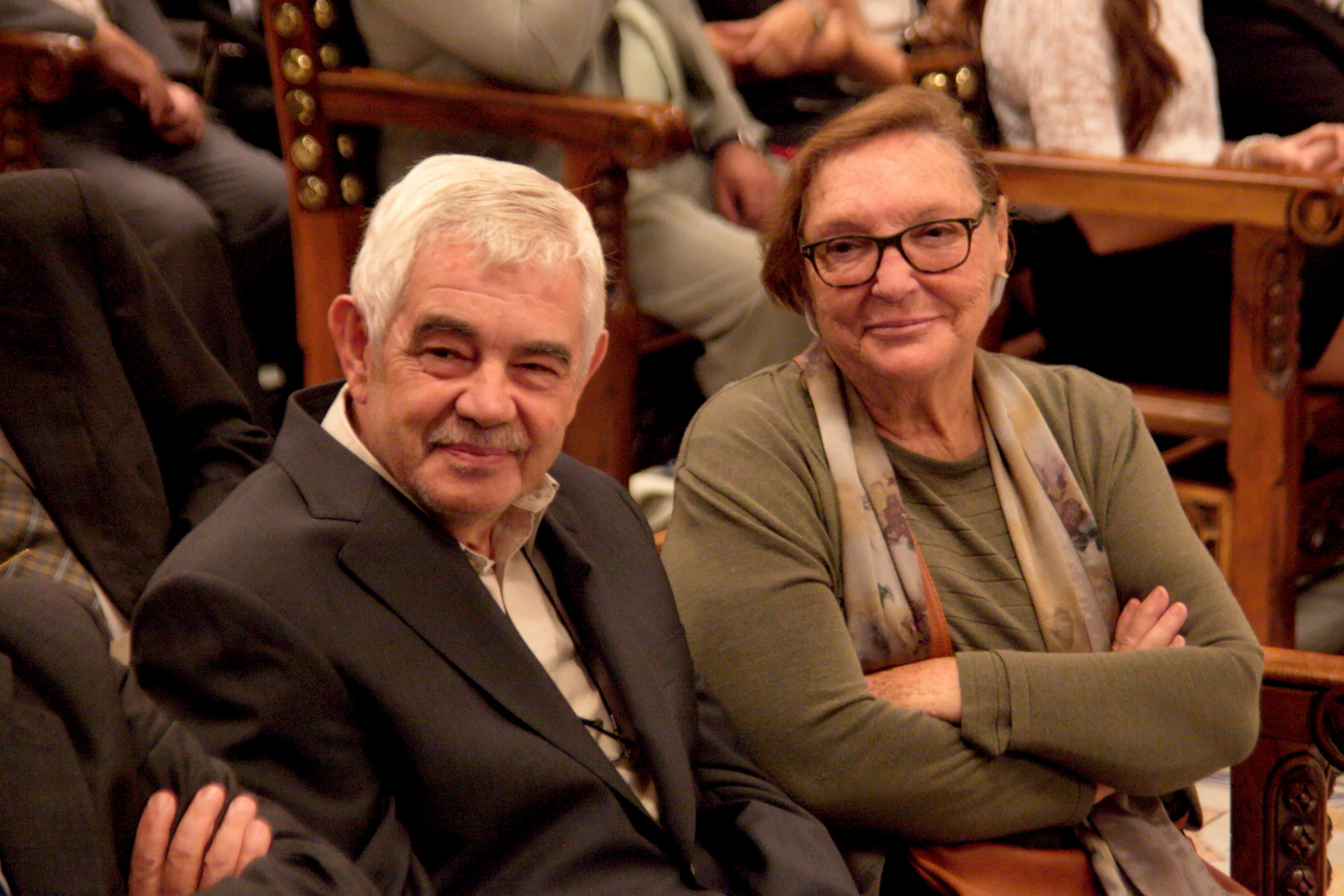
Diana Garrigosa with her husband, Pasqual Maragall, in 2015

Diana Garrigosa Laspeñas (10 November 1944 – 10 February 2020) was a Spanish economist and teacher, wife of 127th President of the Generalitat of Catalonia Pasqual Maragall and president of Pasqual Maragall Foundation since its establishment in 2008.

== Biography ==
Born in Barcelona in 1944, she studied Economy at the University of Barcelona and completed a Master of Econometrics in The New School for Social Research of New York City. After returning to Spain, she worked at the Barcelona City Council's Municipal Computer Center and was a computer science teacher at the Aula school of the city.

She married Pasqual Maragall in 1965, and they had three children. She was a militant of the Socialists' Party of Catalonia for much of his life, leaving the party just before she knew that Pasqual Maragall would not be presidential in the 2006 regional election.

On the occasion of the Olympic Games in Barcelona, in 1992, her husband being mayor of Barcelona, she made one of the reliefs of the Olympic torch.

On 20 October 2007, her husband announced that he was suffering from Alzheimer's and she devoted her life to taking care of him. In April 2008, together with her husband, she created the Pasqual Maragall Foundation, dedicated to the fight against this disease.

In 2010 she starred, together with Maragall, in the documentary film Bicycle, spoon, apple by Carles Bosch, that won a Goya Award in 2011 for Best Documentary and a Gaudí Award the same year.

She died suddenly on February 10, 2020, at the age of 76, from a heart attack.
