= José Luis González (composer) =

Mexican composer

José Luis González (born 1937 in Capilla de Guadalupe, Jalisco) is a Mexican composer. He studied in Guadalajara at the Escuela Superior Diocesana de Musica.
