= Popular Liberation Front (Spain) =

1958–1969 political party in Spain

Popular Liberation Front Frente de Liberación Popular
- Founded: 1958
- Dissolved: 1969
- Headquarters: Madrid
- Ideology: Democratic socialism Antifascism; New Left; Antiimperialism; Self-management socialism
- Political position: Left-wing
- National affiliation: Linked to the Workers' Front of Catalonia and to Euskadiko Sozialisten Batasuna.

The Popular Liberation Front (Spanish: Frente de Liberación Popular, abbreviated FLP or FELIPE) was a clandestine anti-Francoist opposition group in Spain 1958-1969. FLP was founded by Julio Cerón. Amongst the personalities that joined FLP were José Luis Leal, Pasqual Maragall, José Pedro Pérez Llorca and Miguel Roca. FLP emerged as a response to the difficulties of the traditional left to establish a foothold inside Spain. FLP was inspired by the development of left socialist parties like PSU in France and PSIUP in Italy, and was influenced by New Left and Third Worldist movements. The Catalan referent of FLP was the Workers Front of Catalonia and its Basque referent was Euskadiko Sozialisten Batasuna.

In 1962 there was a crackdown against FLP, and around a hundred FLP militants were detained by police.

In 1969 a student and member of the FLP, Enrique Ruano, was killed by the political police while he was arrested, causing a wave of demonstrations and strikes in the universities of Spain. Due to the protests the Regime declared the State of exception on the 24 of January 1969.
