= List of fossiliferous stratigraphic units in Alabama =

This article contains a list of fossil-bearing stratigraphic units in the state of Alabama, U.S.

== Sites ==
Group or Formation	Period	Notes
Bangor Formation	Carboniferous	
Bangor Limestone	Carboniferous	
Bashi Formation	Paleogene	
Blufftown Formation	Cretaceous	
Bucatunna Formation	Paleogene	
Byram Formation		
Chattanooga Shale	Devonian	
Chickamauga Formation	Ordovician	
Chickasaw Group/Nanafalia Formation	Paleogene	
Citronelle Formation		
Claiborne Group/Claiborne Sand	Paleogene	
Claiborne Group/Gosport Sand	Paleogene	
Claiborne Group/Lisbon Formation		
Claiborne Group/Tallahatta Formation		
Clayton Formation		
Conesauga Formation	Cambrian	
Cook Mountain Formation	Paleogene	
Copper Ridge Dolomite	Cambrian	
Crystal River Limestone	Paleogene	
Demopolis Formation	Cretaceous	
Eutaw Formation		
Floyd Shale	Carboniferous	
Fort Payne Chert	Carboniferous	
Gosport Sand	Paleogene	
Hartselle Sandstone	Carboniferous	
Hatchetigbee Formation		
Hatchetigbee Bluff Formation		
Jackson Group/Moodys Branch Formation	Paleogene	
Jackson Group/Ocala	Paleogene	
Jackson Group/Yazoo Clay		
Knox Group	Cambrian	
Leipers Limestone	Ordovician	
Lisbon Formation		
Little Oak Formation	Ordovician	
Longview Formation	Ordovician	
Marianna Limestone	Paleogene	
Mary Lee Formation	Carboniferous	
Midway Group/Clayton Formation		
Midway Group/Fort Gaines Formation	Paleogene	
Midway Group/Naheola Formation		
Midway Group/Nanafalia Formation		
Midway Group/Porters Creek Formation		
Midway Group/Sucarnochee Clay	Paleogene	
Monteagle Limestone	Carboniferous	
Moodys Branch Formation	Paleogene	
Mooreville Chalk		
Naheola Formation		
Nanafalia Formation		
Nawala Formation	Ordovician	
Newala Formation	Ordovician	
Ocala Formation	Paleogene	
Odenville Formation	Ordovician	
Pachuta Marl	Paleogene	
Parkwood Formation	Carboniferous	
Pennington Formation	Carboniferous	
Porters Creek Formation		
Pottsville Formation		
Prairie Bluff Chalk	Cretaceous	
Pratt Formation	Carboniferous	
Providence Sand	Cretaceous	
Red Bluff Clay	Paleogene	
Red Mountain Formation	Silurian	
Ripley Formation		
Rome Formation	Cambrian	
Salt Mountain Limestone	Paleogene	
Selma Group/Demopolis Chalk	Cretaceous	
Selma Group/Mooreville Chalk		
Selma Group/Prairie Bluff Formation	Cretaceous	
Selma Group/Ripley Formation	Cretaceous	
Sequatchie Formation	Ordovician	
Tallahatta Formation	Paleogene	
Tuscahoma Sand		
Tuscaloosa Formation	Cretaceous	
Vicksburg Group/Red Bluff Formation	Paleogene	
Waldron Shale	Silurian	
Wilcox Group/Hatchetigbee Bluff		
Wilcox Group/Nanafalia Formation		
Wilcox Group/Tuscahoma Formation		
Yazoo Clay		

== See also ==
- Paleontology in Alabama
