= Nanafalia Formation =

Geologic formation in Alabama and Mississippi, United States

- Stratigraphic range: Late Paleocene (Thanetian)
- Type: Geological formation
- Unit of: Wilcox Group
- Sub-units: Gravel Creek Sand Member, Ostrea thirsae beds, Grampian Hills Member
- Underlies: Tuscahoma Formation
- Overlies: Naheola Formation
- Thickness: Up to 175 feet (53 m)

Lithology
- Primary: Sand, clay
- Other: Marl, greensand, lignite, bauxite

Location
- Coordinates: 32.114°N 87.998°W
- Region: Alabama, Mississippi
- Country: United States
- Extent: Gulf Coastal Plain

Type section
- Named for: Nanafalia Landing, Marengo County, Alabama
- Named by: E. A. Smith & L. C. Johnson (1887)

The Nanafalia Formation is a geologic formation of late Paleocene age in the Gulf Coastal Plain of Alabama and Mississippi, in the southeastern United States. It forms the lower part of the Wilcox Group and is composed chiefly of clay, sand, glauconitic sand and marl laid down in nearshore-marine and marginal-marine settings, grading updip into cross-bedded sand, lignite and bauxite-bearing clay of more continental character. The formation is richly fossiliferous; its most characteristic fossil is the oyster Gryphaea thirsae.

== Nomenclature and history ==
The unit was named the "Nanafalia series" by Eugene A. Smith and Lawrence C. Johnson in 1887, for exposures at Nanafalia Landing on the Tombigbee River in Marengo County, southern Alabama. Smith had earlier referred to the same rocks under the heading "Nanafalia and Coal Bluff section". As originally defined the series was divided into three lithologic and paleontologic parts and included a basal lignitic interval known as the Coal Bluff beds.

In 1933, C. Wythe Cooke restricted the Nanafalia Formation by removing those basal Coal Bluff beds, which he correlated with the Ackerman Formation of Mississippi; this revised definition is the one in current use. In Mississippi the Nanafalia is the lateral equivalent of, and is largely mapped as, the Ackerman Formation.

== Lithology and members ==
In the subsurface and outcrop belt of southern Alabama the formation is divided, in descending order, into three units:

- Grampian Hills Member (uppermost) – medium-gray massive clay, claystone, sandy fossiliferous clay and fossiliferous fine sand.
- Ostrea thirsae beds – glauconitic, abundantly fossiliferous, quartzose fine to medium sand.
- Gravel Creek Sand Member (basal) – pale-yellowish-orange to reddish-brown, micaceous, cross-bedded fine to very coarse sand containing gravel and clay pebbles, with thin beds of lignite near the base in places.

Updip exposures in northern Henry County and southern Barbour County consist of alternating gray and white clay, carbonaceous clay, fine to coarse sand, and lenses of bauxite and bauxitic clay. The formation is generally deeply weathered, and fresh exposures are uncommon. It reaches a thickness of roughly 175 feet (53 m), with about 168 feet (51 m) reported at the type locality, and thins westward across the state.

== Stratigraphy and age ==
The Nanafalia Formation is the basal formation of the Wilcox Group. It unconformably overlies the Naheola Formation of the Midway Group; in places the lower sands of the Nanafalia are difficult to distinguish from the underlying Coal Bluff Marl Member of the Naheola, and the contact is mapped at the top of the Naheola's Oak Hill Member. The formation is conformably overlain by the Tuscahoma Formation.

Although some early workers assigned the unit to the early Eocene, it is now regarded as late Paleocene (Thanetian). G. Lynn Wingard (1993) dated it as Paleocene on the basis of the bivalves Crassatella tumidula and Crassatella aquiana collected from Marengo and Pike counties.

== Paleontology ==
The Nanafalia preserves an abundant marine molluscan fauna. Its index fossil is the oyster Gryphaea thirsae (historically referred to as Ostrea thirsae), which is so abundant in the Ostrea thirsae beds that one interval near the base is, in early accounts, described as packed with the shells. Other characteristic invertebrates include the crassatellid bivalves Crassatella tumidula and Crassatella aquiana. Fossil occurrences from the formation are catalogued in the Paleobiology Database.

== See also ==
- List of fossiliferous stratigraphic units in Alabama
- Paleontology in Alabama
- Wilcox Group
