= Tuscahoma Formation =

Geologic formation in the United States

- Stratigraphic range: Thanetian to earliest Ypresian, 57–55 Ma
- Type: Formation
- Unit of: Wilcox Group
- Sub-units: Bells Landing Member, Greggs Landing Member
- Underlies: Bashi Formation
- Overlies: Nanafalia Formation

Lithology
- Primary: Sandstone

Location
- Region: Mississippi, Alabama
- Country: United States

The Tuscahoma Formation or Tuscahoma Sand is a geologic formation in Mississippi and Alabama, United States. It preserves fossils dating back to the early Paleogene period, from the Late Paleocene and Early Eocene. It was primarily deposited in a marine habitat, but one Wasatchian-aged locality near Meridian, Mississippi was deposited in an estuarine habitat that preserves a significant terrestrial vertebrate fauna, known as the "Red Hot local fauna". It preserves one of the most diverse early Eocene mammalian faunas from eastern North America, roughly contemporaneous with the Willwood Formation of Wyoming.

== Vertebrate paleofauna ==
=== Cartilaginous fishes ===
Based on the Paleobiology Database:

Cartilaginous fishes of the Tuscahoma Formation
Genus	Species	Location	Stratigraphic position	Material	Notes	Images
Abdounia	A. beaugei				A requiem shark.	
Abdounia	A. subulidens				A requiem shark.	
Aetomylaeus	A. dixoni				An eagle ray.	
Anomotodon	A. sp.				A goblin shark.	
Brachycarcharias	B. mississippiensis				A sand shark, type locality of species.	
Carcharias	C. hoperi				A sand shark.	
Carcharias	C. robustus				A sand shark.	
Carcharias	C. teretidens				A sand shark.	
Chaenogaleus	C. affinis				A relative of the hooktooth shark.	
Coupatezia	C. woutersi				A stingray of uncertain affinities.	
Cretalamna	C. aschersoni				A megatooth shark.	
Cretalamna	C. lerichei				A megatooth shark.	
Dasyatis	D. jaekeli				A whiptail stingray.	
Dasyatis	D. tricuspidatus				A whiptail stingray.	
Eotorpedo	E. jaekeli				A torpedo ray.	
Galeorhinus	G. minor				A relative of the school shark.	
Galeorhinus	G. ypresiensis				A relative of the school shark.	
Ginglymostoma	G. subafricanum				A nurse shark.	
Hypotodus	H. verticalis				A sand shark.	
?Jaekelotodus	J. sp.				A sand shark.	
Mustelus	M. rogersi				A smooth-hound.	
Nebrius	N. thielensis				A nurse shark.	
Odontaspis	O. borodini				A sand shark, type locality of O. borodini and O. hynei.	
Odontaspis	O. hynei				A sand shark, type locality of O. borodini and O. hynei.	
Odontaspis	O. speyeri				A sand shark, type locality of O. borodini and O. hynei.	
Odontaspis	O. substriatus				A sand shark, type locality of O. borodini and O. hynei.	
Odontaspis	?O. winkleri				A sand shark, type locality of O. borodini and O. hynei.	
Pachygaleus	P. lefevrei				A houndshark.	
Physogaleus	P. americanus				A requiem shark. Type locality of P. americanus.	
Physogaleus	P. tertius				A requiem shark. Type locality of P. americanus.	
Pristis	P. sp.		Late Paleocene		A sawfish.	
Pseudodontaspis	P. lauderdalensis				A sand shark, type locality of species.	
Rhinobatos	R. sp.				A guitarfish.	
Striatolamia	S. macrota				A sand shark.	

=== Ray-finned fishes ===
Based on the Paleobiology Database:

Ray-finned fishes of the Tuscahoma Formation
Genus	Species	Location	Stratigraphic position	Material	Notes	Images
Albula	A. eppsi	Lauderdale County, Mississippi	Early Eocene		A bonefish.	
Albula	A. oweni	Lauderdale County, Mississippi	Early Eocene		A bonefish.	
Brychaetus	B. muelleri	Lauderdale County, Mississippi	Early Eocene		A bonytongue.	
Egertonia	E. isodonta	Lauderdale County, Mississippi	Early Eocene		A phyllodontid.	
Lepisosteus	L. sp.	Lauderdale County, Mississippi	Early Eocene		A gar. Assigned to the European species L. suessionensis (itself a junior synonym of L. fimbriatus), but this is unlikely due to their differing ranges.	
Palaeocybium	P. proosti	Lauderdale County, Mississippi	Early Eocene		A mackerel.	
Phyllodus	P. toliapicus	Lauderdale County, Mississippi	Early Eocene		A phyllodontid.	
Pycnodus	P. bowerbanki	Lauderdale County, Mississippi	Early Eocene		A pycnodont.	
Trichiurides	T. sagittidens	Lauderdale County, Mississippi	Early Eocene		A cutlassfish.	

=== Reptiles ===
Based on the Paleobiology Database:

Reptiles of the Tuscahoma Formation
Genus	Species	Location	Stratigraphic position	Material	Notes	Images
Palaeophis	P. casei	Meridian, Mississippi	Early Eocene		A marine palaeophiid snake.	
Palaeophis	P. littoralis	Meridian, Mississippi	Early Eocene		A marine palaeophiid snake.	
Palaeophis	P. virginianus	Meridian, Mississippi	Early Eocene		A marine palaeophiid snake.	
Tuscahomaophis	T. leggetti	Meridian, Mississippi	Late Paleocene		An alethinophidian snake.	

=== Mammals ===
The Tuscahoma Formation preserves a diversity of earliest Eocene-aged mammals. Almost all mammals are known only from isolated teeth. There appear to be significant differences in the faunal composition between the Tuscahoma Formation and the contemporaneous Bighorn Basin of the western US, indicating some level of provincialism in North American mammal species assemblages of the time. The formation appears to have been biased against the preservation of large-sized mammals, meaning that the majority of mammal remains from the formation are of smaller taxa.

Based on the Paleobiology Database and Dawson & Beard (2009):

==== Metatheria ====
Metatherians of the Tuscahoma Formation
Genus	Species	Location	Stratigraphic position	Material	Notes	Images
Mimoperadectes	M. sowasheensis	Meridian, Mississippi	Early Eocene		A peradectid.	
Peratherium	P. mcgrewi	Meridian, Mississippi	Early Eocene		A herpetotheriid.	

==== Cimolesta ====
Cimolestans of the Tuscahoma Formation
Genus	Species	Location	Stratigraphic position	Material	Notes	Images
Coryphodon	C. sp.	Meridian, Mississippi	Early Eocene		A pantodont.	
Naranius	N. americanus	Meridian, Mississippi	Early Eocene		A cimolestid. Type locality of species.	
Palaeosinopa	P. aestuarium	Meridian, Mississippi	Early Eocene		A pantolestid. Type locality of species.	

==== Macroscelidea ====
Macroscelideans of the Tuscahoma Formation
Genus	Species	Location	Stratigraphic position	Material	Notes	Images
Haplomylus	H. meridionalis	Meridian, Mississippi	Early Eocene		An apheliscid.	

==== Ungulates ====
Ungulates of the Tuscahoma Formation
Genus	Species	Location	Stratigraphic position	Material	Notes	Images
Diacodexis	D. sp.	Meridian, Mississippi	Early Eocene		An even-toed ungulate.	
Ectocion	E. nanabeensis	Meridian, Mississippi	Early Eocene		A phenacodont. Type locality of species.	
Hyracotherium	H. sp.	Meridian, Mississippi	Early Eocene		An odd-toed ungulate.	

==== Pan-Carnivorans ====
Ungulates of the Tuscahoma Formation
Genus	Species	Location	Stratigraphic position	Material	Notes	Images
Eogale	E. parydros	Meridian, Mississippi	Early Eocene		A miacid carnivoramorph. Type locality of genus and species.	
Gracilocyon	G. igniculus	Meridian, Mississippi	Early Eocene		A carnivoraform.	
"Miacis"	"M." sp.	Meridian, Mississippi	Early Eocene		A carnivoramorph.	
Prototomus	P. sp.	Meridian, Mississippi	Early Eocene		A sinopid hyaenodont.	
Uintacyon	U. sp.	Meridian, Mississippi	Early Eocene		A carnivoraform.	
Vassacyon	V. sp.	Meridian, Mississippi	Early Eocene		A carnivoraform.	
Viverravus	V. laytoni	Meridian, Mississippi	Early Eocene		A viverravid carnivoramorph.	
Viverriscus	V. omnivorus	Meridian, Mississippi	Early Eocene		A viverravid carnivoramorph. Type locality of genus and species.	

==== Eulipotyphlans ====
Eulipotyphlans of the Tuscahoma Formation
Genus	Species	Location	Stratigraphic position	Material	Notes	Images
Colpocherus	C. mississippiensis				A sespedectid. Type locality of genus and species.	
Diacocherus	D. dockeryi				An erinaceoid. Type localiy of species.	
Plagioctenodon	P. dormaalensis				A nyctitheriid.	
Talpavoides	T. dartoni				A stem-erinaceid.	
Wyonycteris	W. primitivus				A nyctitheriid. Type locality of species.	

==== Apatotherians ====
Apatotherians of the Tuscahoma Formation
Genus	Species	Location	Stratigraphic position	Material	Notes	Images
Apatemys	A. pygmaeus	Meridian, Mississippi	Early Eocene		An apatemyid. Type locality of species.	

==== Rodents ====
Rodents of the Tuscahoma Formation
Genus	Species	Location	Stratigraphic position	Material	Notes	Images
Corbarimys	C. nomadus	Meridian, Mississippi	Early Eocene		An ischyromyoid.	
Franimys	F. actites	Meridian, Mississippi	Early Eocene		An ischyromyid.	
Paramys	P. dispar	Meridian, Mississippi	Early Eocene		An ischyromyid.	
Tuscahomys	T. major	Meridian, Mississippi	Early Eocene		A cylindrodontid. Type locality of genus and species.	
Tuscahomys	T. medius	Meridian, Mississippi	Early Eocene		A cylindrodontid. Type locality of genus and species.	
Tuscahomys	T. minor	Meridian, Mississippi	Early Eocene		A cylindrodontid. Type locality of genus and species.	

==== Primates ====
Primates of the Tuscahoma Formation
Genus	Species	Location	Stratigraphic position	Material	Notes	Images
Choctawius	C. foxi		Meridian, Mississippi		An omomyid. Type locality of genus and species.	
Teilhardina	T. magnoliana		Meridian, Mississippi		An omomyid.	

== See also ==
- List of fossiliferous stratigraphic units in Mississippi
- Paleontology in Mississippi
