= 1945 in paleontology =

List of years in paleontology	(table)
- … 1935; 1936; 1937; 1938; 1939; 1940; 1941; 1942; 1943; 1944; 1945; 1946; 1947; 1948; 1949; 1950; 1951; 1952; 1953; 1954; 1955 …
- In science 1942 1943 1944 1945 1946 1947 1948
- Art; Archaeology; Architecture; Literature; Music; Philosophy; Science; +...

Paleontology or palaeontology is the study of prehistoric life forms on Earth through the examination of plant and animal fossils. This includes the study of body fossils, tracks (ichnites), burrows, cast-off parts, fossilised feces (coprolites), palynomorphs and chemical residues. Because humans have encountered fossils for millennia, paleontology has a long history both before and after becoming formalized as a science. This article records significant discoveries and events related to paleontology that occurred or were published in the year 1945.

== Archosauromorphs ==
=== Newly named protorosaurs ===
Name	Status	Authors	Age	Unit	Location	Notes	Images
Gwyneddosaurus	Possible synonym of Tanytrachelos	Bock	Late Triassic (Carnian)	Lockatong Formation	United States	A tanystropheid.	

=== Dinosaurs ===
Name	Novelty	Status	Authors	Age	Type locality	Location	Notes	Images
Neosaurus missouriensis	Gen. et sp. nov.	Preoccupied	Gilmore	Maastrichtian	Ripley Formation	United States	Preoccupied by Neosaurus Nopsca, 1923 and renamed Parrosaurus	
Parrosaurus	Gen. nov.	Nomen dubium	Gilmore	Maastrichtian	Ripley Formation	United States	A new genus name for Neosaurus missouriensis	
Stegoceras lambei	Sp. nov.	Valid	Sternberg	Campanian	Oldman Formation	Canada	A species of Stegoceras later named Colepiocephale lambei	
