= Hartselle Sandstone =

Geologic formation in Alabama, U.S.

- Stratigraphic range: Carboniferous
- Type: Formation
- Overlies: Pride Mountain Formation

Lithology
- Primary: sandstone

Location
- Region: Alabama and Mississippi
- Country: United States

The Hartselle Sandstone is a geologic formation in Alabama. It preserves fossils dating back to the Carboniferous period.

== See also ==
- List of fossiliferous stratigraphic units in Alabama
- Paleontology in Alabama
