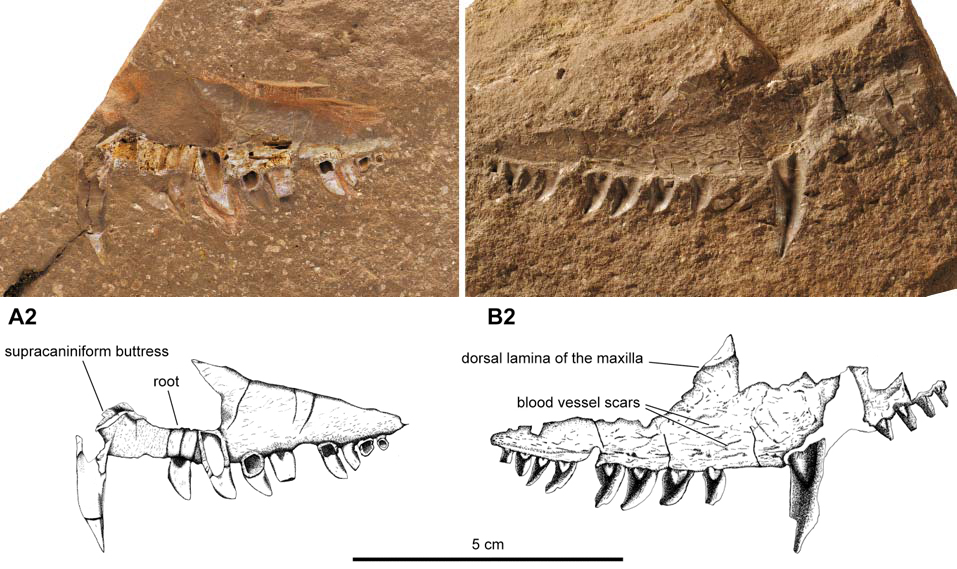
- Holotype

Scientific classification
- Domain: Eukaryota
- Kingdom: Animalia
- Phylum: Chordata
- Clade: Synapsida
- Family: †Sphenacodontidae
- Genus: †Neosaurus; Nopsca, 1923

Type species
- †Neosaurus cynodus (Gervais, 1869)

Synonyms
- Geosaurus cynodus Gervais, 1869

= Neosaurus =

Neosaurus Temporal range: Late Carboniferous-Early Permian, 300–295.5 Ma

Extinct genus of synapsids

Neosaurus ('New Lizard') is an extinct genus of pelycosaur-grade synapsids from the Late Carboniferous-Early Permian of the Jura region of France. It is known only from a partial maxilla or upper jaw bone and an associated impression of the bone. The teardrop shape of the teeth in the jaw indicate that Neosaurus belongs to the family Sphenacodontidae, which includes the better-known Dimetrodon from the Southwestern United States. The maxilla was first attributed to an early diapsid reptile in 1857, and later a crocodylomorph in 1869, before finally being identified as a sphenacodont synapsid in 1899, a classification that still holds today.

A species of the hadrosaur dinosaur Hypsibema, H. missouriensis, is also called Neosaurus, although because the name was already in use, that species was renamed Parrosaurus before being reassigned to Hypsibema.
