= Gilbertown, Alabama =

- Town
- Location of Gilbertown in Choctaw County, Alabama.
- Coordinates: 31°52′36″N 88°18′35″W
- Country: United States
- State: Alabama
- County: Choctaw

Area
  - Total: 10.52 sq mi (27.24 km^{2})
  - Land: 10.52 sq mi (27.24 km^{2})
  - Water: 0 sq mi (0.00 km^{2})
- Elevation: 89 ft (27 m)

Population (2020)
  - Total: 739
  - Density: 70.3/sq mi (27.13/km^{2})
- Time zone: UTC-6 (Central (CST))
  - Summer (DST): UTC-5 (CDT)
- ZIP code: 36908
- Area code: 251
- FIPS code: 01-29704
- GNIS feature ID: 2406569
- Website: https://www.gilbertown.org/

Gilbertown is a town in Choctaw County, Alabama, United States. At the 2020 census, the population was 739.

== Geography ==
Gilbertown is located in southern Choctaw County.

According to the U.S. Census Bureau, the town has a total area of 0.77 square miles (2.0 km^{2}), all land.

== Demographics ==
Historical population
Census	Pop.	Note	%±
1920	229		—
1950	413		—
1960	270		−34.6%
1970	207		−23.3%
1980	218		5.3%
1990	235		7.8%
2000	187		−20.4%
2010	215		15.0%
2020	739		243.7%
U.S. Decennial Census; 2013 Estimate

As of the census of 2000, there were 187 people, 90 households, and 54 families residing in the town. The population density was 232.9 inhabitants per square mile (89.9/km^{2}). There were 111 housing units at an average density of 138.3 per square mile (53.4/km^{2}). The racial makeup of the town was 86.63% White, 10.70% Black or African American, 1.07% Native American, and 1.60% from two or more races.

There were 90 households, out of which 24.4% had children under the age of 18 living with them, 48.9% were married couples living together, 7.8% had a female householder with no husband present, and 38.9% were non-families. 35.6% of all households were made up of individuals, and 21.1% had someone living alone who was 65 years of age or older. The average household size was 2.08 and the average family size was 2.69.

In the town, the population was spread out, with 18.7% under the age of 18, 5.9% from 18 to 24, 26.7% from 25 to 44, 30.5% from 45 to 64, and 18.2% who were 65 years of age or older. The median age was 43 years. For every 100 females, there were 83.3 males. For every 100 females age 18 and over, there were 85.4 males.

The median income for a household in the town was $27,917, and the median income for a family was $44,167. Males had a median income of $40,625 versus $21,250 for females. The per capita income for the town was $18,492. About 15.5% of families and 23.1% of the population were below the poverty line, including 38.6% of those under the age of eighteen and 19.4% of those 65 or over.

Local events include the Choctaw County Heritage Festival, which takes place usually between May 30 and June 3. Gilbertown is the site of the first producing oil well in Alabama.

== First permitted oil well in Alabama ==
The first permit to drill an oil well in Alabama, the A. R. Jackson Well No. 1, was granted to the Hunt Oil Company on January 2, 1944, near Gilbertown. Drilling started January 10, 1944, and struck in chalk of the Selma Group approximately one month later at a depth of 2,580 feet (790 m).

== Climate ==
The climate in this area is characterized by hot, humid summers and generally mild to cool winters. According to the Köppen Climate Classification system, Gilbertown has a humid subtropical climate, abbreviated "Cfa" on climate maps.

== Notable people ==
- Angela Quentina Arnold (known as AQA), professional wrestler signed to AEW.
- Gary Banks, former player for Chicago Cubs and San Diego Chargers
- Jeff Branson, former infielder for several teams
- Spencer Johnson, former defensive tackle two teams
- Paul Ruffin, first African American senior research scientist in the civilian U.S. Army workforce
