= Naheola Formation =

Geologic formation in Alabama, United States

- Type: Formation
- Unit of: Midway Group

Location
- Region: Alabama
- Country: United States

The Naheola Formation is a geologic formation in Alabama, United States. It preserves fossils.

== See also ==
- List of fossiliferous stratigraphic units in Alabama
- Paleontology in Alabama
