= Chickamauga Formation =

Geologic formation in Alabama, United States

- Stratigraphic range: Ordovician
- Type: Formation

Location
- Region: Alabama
- Country: United States

The Chickamauga Formation is a geologic formation in Alabama. It preserves fossils dating back to the Ordovician period.

== See also ==
- List of fossiliferous stratigraphic units in Alabama
- Paleontology in Alabama
