= Salt Mountain Limestone =

Geologic formation in Alabama and Mississippi, United States

- Stratigraphic range: Thanetian; ~58–55 Ma
- Type: Formation

Lithology
- Primary: Limestone

Location
- Region: Alabama, Mississippi
- Country: United States

The Salt Mountain Limestone is a geologic formation in southern Alabama and Mississippi.

It is a Paleogene Period limestone formation. and preserves fossils dating back to the Paleogene period.

== Name ==
The name Salt Mountain Limestone replaced the descriptive name "Coral limestone" with Glendon limestone and replaced the paleontologic name "Orbitoidal limestone" with Marianna limestone. Both of these limestones are exposed near Salt Mountain, "which is now considered to be a tilted block brought up by the Jackson fault.

== See also ==
- Limestone formations in the United States
- List of fossiliferous stratigraphic units in Alabama
- Paleontology in Alabama
