= Chronister dinosaur site =

Fossil site in Missouri

Chronister Dinosaur Site
- Stratigraphic range: Campanian, 75 Ma
- Type: Fossil site
- Unit of: McNairy Sand Member, Ripley Formation
- Underlies: Prairie Bluff Chalk Formation
- Overlies: Demopolis Chalk Formation
- Thickness: up to 24 m (79 ft) (fossils found at 8 m (26 ft))

Lithology
- Primary: Glauconitic sandstone
- Other: Micaceous chalk

Location
- Region: Missouri
- Country: United States

The Chronister Dinosaur Site is a fossil site within the McNairy Sand Member of the Ripley Formation, Missouri. Dinosaur fossils are among the known remains from the Chronister Dinosaur Site, most of which are housed in Washington, D.C.'s Smithsonian Institution.

== History ==
The site was discovered in Spring 1942 by the Chronister family, possibly by Lulu Chronister, while they were digging a cistern within the site, which is located in Glen Allen, and the first fossils identified from the site were subsequently collected by Dan R. Stewart, later nicknamed "Dinosaur Dan."

In 1942, Stewart, of the Missouri Geological Survey, had been examining clay near Glen Allen when he came upon a boy who led him to the family at work digging. According to Stewart, property owner Lulu Chronister had found several "unusual" bones while digging and had saved them. They had been found about 8 feet (2.4 m) deep in the Chronisters' well, which had an overall depth of 24 feet (7.3 m), "imbedded in a black plastic clay." Stewart reported his discovery to the Smithsonian Institution, which bought the remains, specimen USNM V16735, consisting of thirteen caudal vertebrae, from Chronister for US$50, which was later used to purchase a cow. Two other bones, of unknown type, were also recovered from the site, while one additional vertebrae had been given by Lulu Chronister to a friend. At the Smithsonian, the bones were analyzed but the species from which they originated was incorrectly identified. They were later placed in the genus Parrosaurus. The Chronister Dinosaur Site was untouched by paleontologists until the late 1970s, when excavations were restarted by Bruce L. Stinchcomb. New remains of Parrosaurus, including dental remains and part of a jaw, were found, and remains of other dinosaurs, fish, turtles, and plants have also been found, including teeth belonging to a member of the Tyrannosauroidea. In the 1980s, test excavations were performed at the site by Bruce L. Stinchcomb. David Parris, Barbara Grandstaff, and Robert Denton of the NJ State Museum examined the fossils, leading them to conclude that Parrosaurus was actually a hadrosauroid rather than a sauropod. Excavations halted after a severe ice storm destroyed the greenhouse structure protecting the site in 2009, and excavations resumed in 2017 as funded by the Field Museum in Chicago.

Jetton, then Speaker of the Missouri House of Representatives, mentioned that he hoped the Chronister Dinosaur Site would become part of a state park one day. Currently, excavation is being conducted by the Missouri Ozark Dinosaur Project. The site has been covered to prevent water from flowing over dig material. The Chronister dig site near Glen Allen, currently under private ownership by Stinchcomb, who purchased the site from the Chronister family in the early 1980s.

== Geology ==
One paleontologist from St. Louis currently working at the dig site said it was "pretty much a miracle" that dinosaur bones were found in Missouri, because the state's soft soil has resulted in the deterioration of most prehistoric remains. However, some of the remains found have been damaged by erosion and other processes. While much of Missouri lies upon rocks from the Paleozoic or Precambrian eras, the Chronister site is situated over Mesozoic rock. Stewart, who found the bones after being assigned to study the origins of clay in the southeastern portion of the Ozarks, was able to conclude that part of the region lies upon deposits from the Upper Cretaceous period, although much of the sediment from that time period has eroded away.

The Chronister family dug the well (which they ultimately abandoned after it was unable to provide enough water) just southwest of their farmhouse, atop a body of limestone. The farmhouse was located near the bottom of a steep valley, sitting atop the remains of a terrace. The layer of clay in which the bones were found was described by Stewart as being 9 feet (2.7 m) thick, situated below 7 feet (2.1 m) of yellow-brown clay and gravel at the surface, and above a dense mass of limestone.

Though this deposit is late Cretaceous in age, several varieties of Paleozoic sediments were found associated with the bone-bearing clays; material from the middle Ordovician Plattin and Kimmswick Limestones, late Ordovician Maquoketa Formation, early Silurian Bainbridge Group limestones, as well as early Devonian Bailey Formation limestones have all been recognized by geologists studying the deposit. These sediments are similar both in composition and age to the sediments found in both the Marble Hill and Glen Allen structures and are, most likely, tectonically related. Late Cretaceous leaf impressions have been found in laminated Cretaceous clays in the Marble Hill structure, but no vertebrate material has been recovered.

== Paleofauna ==
Chronister Dinosaur Site Fauna
| Class | Order | Family | Genus | Species |
|---|---|---|---|---|
| Chondrichthyes | Hybodontoidea | Hybodontidae | Lissodus | sp. |
| Chondrichthyes | Batoidea | unknown | unknown | unknown |
| Osteichthyes | Semionotoidea | Lepisosteidae | Lepisosteus | sp. |
| Osteichthyes | Amioidea | Amiidae | Platacodon | nanus |
| Reptilia | Chelonia | Dermatemydidae | Naomichelys | speciosa |
| Reptilia | Chelonia | Trionychidae | Trionyx | sp. |
| Reptilia | Crocodylia | Crocodylidae | Leidyosuchus | sp. |
| Reptilia | Saurischia | Ornithomimidae | unknown | unknown |
| Reptilia | Saurischia | Tyrannosauridae | unknown | unknown |
| Reptilia | Saurischia | Dromaeosauridae | unknown | unknown |
| Reptilia | Ornithopoda | Hadrosauroidea | Parrosaurus | missouriensis |

== Paleogeography ==
The variety of faunal remnants found at the Chronister site suggest that a large body of water once existed close to the area. Previous interpretations of the site concluded the site to be a minor deposit of clay in a sinkhole; however, aquatic taxa recovered from the deposit, such as the turtle Trionyx, suggest a coastal plain lacustrine environment.
