= Parkwood Formation =

Carboniferous period geologic formation in Alabama and Mississippi, United States

- Stratigraphic range: Carboniferous
- Type: Formation
- Underlies: Pottsville Formation

Location
- Region: Alabama and Mississippi
- Country: United States

The Parkwood Formation is a geologic formation in Alabama. It preserves fossils dating back to the Carboniferous period.

== See also ==
- List of fossiliferous stratigraphic units in Alabama
- Paleontology in Alabama
