= Odenville Formation =

Geologic formation in Alabama, United States

Odenville Limestone
- Stratigraphic range: Ordovician
- Type: Formation
- Underlies: post-Knox formations
- Overlies: Newala Limestone
- Thickness: 0-366 feet

Location
- Region: Alabama
- Country: United States

Type section
- Named for: Odenville, Alabama
- Named by: Charles Butts

The Odenville Limestone is a geologic formation in Alabama. It preserves fossils dating from the early Ordovician Period.

As first described by geologist Charles Butts in a 1926 report on Alabama’s geology, the Odenville consisted of “impure argillaceous and siliceous dark fine-grained cherty limestone,” about fifty feet in thickness.

Butts’ original type exposure could not be located by subsequent mappers, so the Odenville nomenclature was dropped and the formation was considered a locally-occurring facies of the underlying Newala Limestone.

Keith Roberson in 1988, and Ed Osborne in 1992, demonstrated the Odenville is indeed a distinctive, mappable lithologic unit, and the term was restored to the Ordovician nomenclature used by the Geological Survey of Alabama in the Appalachian fold-and-thrust belt.

As defined today, the Odenville Limestone is described as a dark gray, primarily dolomitic, stylonodular limestone whose fossil assemblage includes brachiopods and sponges. It is the uppermost member of the Knox Group, a related suite of carbonate rocks deposited at the end of the Cambrian and beginning of the Ordovician.

The Odenville Limestone occupies a narrow outcrop belt within the Cahaba Valley. Its extent along strike reaches from the overlap of Coastal Plain sediments in northwestern Chilton County to a point just northeast of its type locality, where it appears to pinch out in central St. Clair County. The formation does not crop out among Ordovician units exposed in the Coosa Deformed Belt. The Odenville may be present among Knox Group units in the Coosa Valley, but lack of exposures and intense weathering have precluded definitive identification of the Odenville in Knox-underlain areas between Pell City and Talladega.

== See also ==
- List of fossiliferous stratigraphic units in Alabama
- Paleontology in Alabama
