= Pachuta Marl =

Geologic formation in Alabama, United States

- Stratigraphic range: Paleogene
- Type: Formation

Location
- Region: Alabama
- Country: United States

The Pachuta Marl is a geologic formation in Alabama. It preserves fossils dating back to the Paleogene period.

== See also ==
- List of fossiliferous stratigraphic units in Alabama
- Paleontology in Alabama
