= Chickasaw Group =

Fossil preservation group

- Stratigraphic range: Paleogene
- Type: Group

Location
- Region: Alabama
- Country: United States

The Chickasaw Group is a geologic group in Alabama. It preserves fossils dating back to the Paleogene period.

== See also ==
- List of fossiliferous stratigraphic units in Alabama
- Paleontology in Alabama
