= Wilcox Group =

Geologic group in North America

- Stratigraphic range: Selandian-Ypresian; ~60–48 Ma
- Type: Geologic group
- Unit of: Gulf of Mexico Basin
- Sub-units: Calvert Bluff, Simsboro & Hooper Formations (Texas); Nanafalia, Hatchetigbee Formation (Alabama)
- Underlies: Claiborne Group
- Overlies: Midway Group
- Thickness: up to 1,800 ft (550 m)

Lithology
- Primary: Mudstone, sandstone, lignite
- Other: Siltstone

Location
- Location: Gulf Coast and Mississippi Embayment
- Coordinates: 30°25′N 96°24′W
- Region: Gulf Coast and Mississippi Embayment
- Country: United States and Mexico
- Extent: Florida to Tamaulipas

Type section
- Named for: Wilcox County, Alabama
- Location: not designated

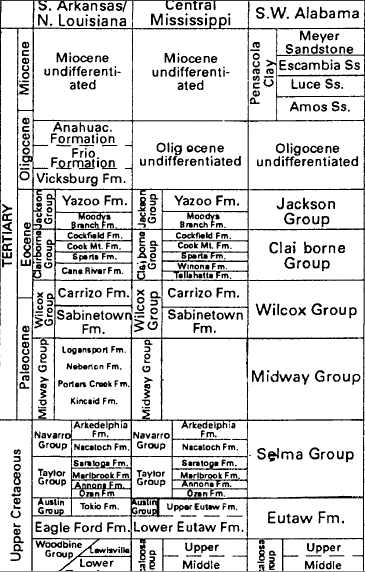
Wilcox Group - stratigraphy

The Wilcox Group is an important geologic group in the Gulf of Mexico basin and surrounding onshore areas from Mexico and Texas to Louisiana and Alabama. The group ranges in age from Paleocene to Eocene and is in Texas subdivided into the Calvert Bluff, Simsboro and Hooper Formations, and in Alabama into the Nanafalia and Hatchetigbee Formations. Other subdivisions are the Lower, Middle and Upper Wilcox Subgroups, and the Carrizo and Indio Formations.

== Lithologies ==
The group comprises mostly mudstone with secondary sandstone and lignite beds, ironstone concretions, as well as siltstones, conglomerates and limestones. The total thickness is about 1,400 to 1,800 feet (430 to 550 m).

== Provenance of sandstones ==
Sandstone modal compositions and detrital zircon U‐Pb analyses of the Wilcox Group indicate long‐distance sediment transport from primarily volcanic and basement sources to the west, northwest, and southwest. The Wilcox Group represents the earliest series of major post‐Cretaceous pulses of sand deposition along the western margin of the Gulf of Mexico. Laramide basement uplifts have long been held to be the source of Wilcox sediments, implying that initiation of basement uplift was the driving factor for the transition from carbonate sedimentation to clastic deposition. Zircon age‐spectra for the sandstones of the Wilcox Group reveal a complex grain assemblage derived from Laramide uplifted crystalline blocks of the central and southern Rocky Mountains, the Cordilleran arc of western North America, and arc‐related extrusive and intrusive igneous rocks of northern Mexico.

Zircon ages also suggest possible recycling of older sediment through uplift related to accretion of arc terranes along the westernmost North America, but that recycling of Cordilleran foreland basin sediments was not a major contributor. Comparison of Upper and Lower Wilcox zircon age-spectra indicate that Lower Wilcox sediments are richer in arc and volcanic material, whereas Upper Wilcox sediments are richer in basement material. Regional trends in detrital zircon age‐spectra indicate that Upper Wilcox sediments are moderately homogeneous over the region studied, whereas the Lower Wilcox shows significant heterogeneity. The drainage area for the Gulf of Mexico during the Paleocene and Eocene was larger than previously thought, encompassing not only the Laramide basement uplifts, but the volcanic province of northern Mexico and possibly Cordilleran tectonic regions along the westernmost North America.

== Petroleum geology ==
The Wilcox Group comprises important source and reservoir rocks in the Gulf of Mexico basin. Structural and geochemical evidence indicates that hydrocarbons found in Wilcox reservoirs such as the Wilds sandstones were emplaced by vertical migration along wrench faults and associated fracture zones from underlying Cretaceous and Jurassic source rocks.

== See also ==
- List of fossiliferous stratigraphic units in Alabama
- List of fossiliferous stratigraphic units in Louisiana
- List of fossiliferous stratigraphic units in Mexico
- List of fossiliferous stratigraphic units in Texas
- Paleontology in Alabama
- Paleontology in Louisiana
- Paleontology in Texas
