= Paul Ruffin =

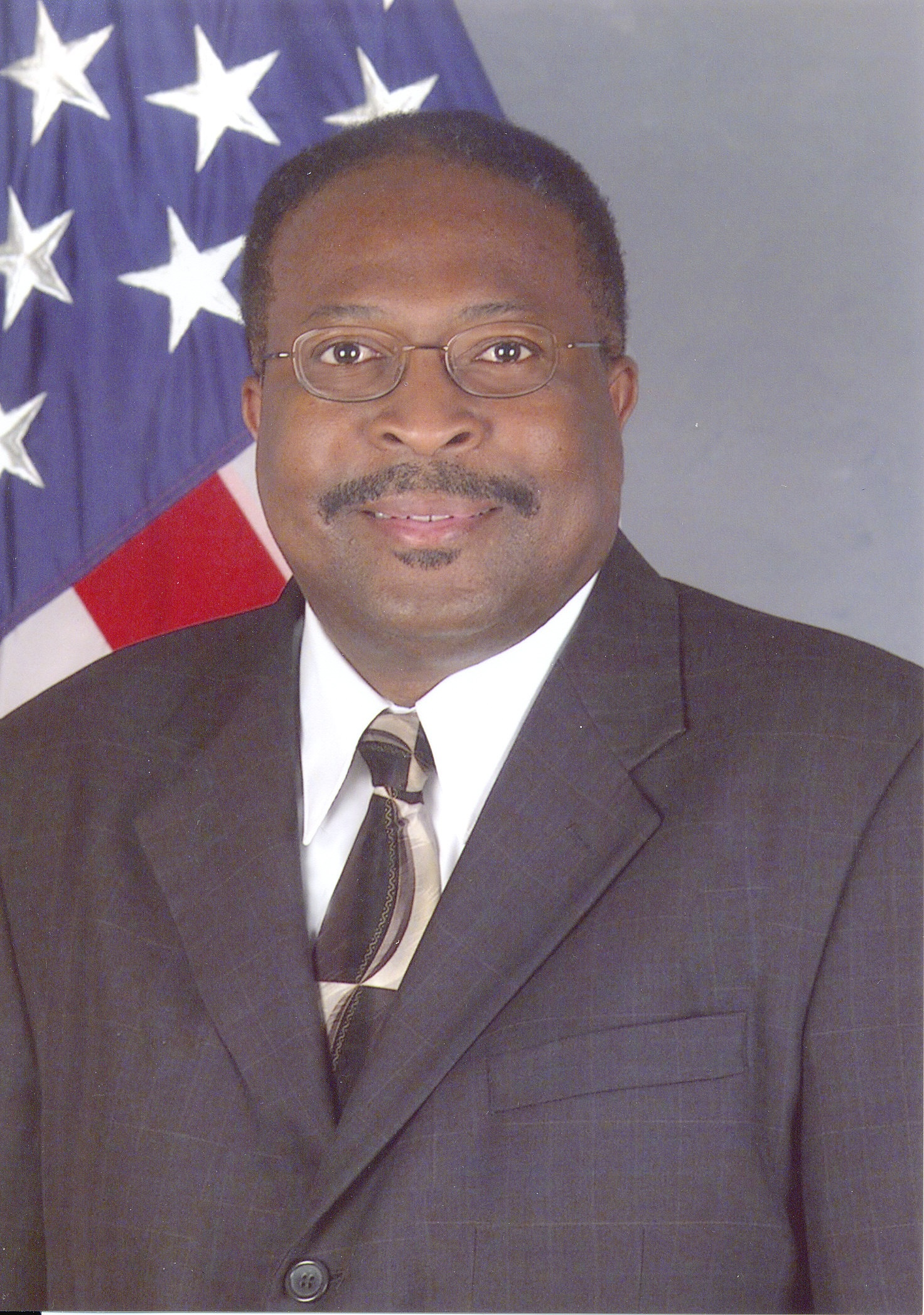

Paul B. Ruffin (born March 20, 1955) is an American scientist and educator. He is active in the field of applied science during his career as a research physicist conducting exploratory and advanced research and development in Fiber-optic communication, Microelectromechanical systems (MEMS), and Nanotechnology at the U. S. Army Aviation and Missile Research, Development, and Engineering Center (AMRDEC). In July 2003, Ruffin was promoted to the highest rank for a research scientist — Senior Research Scientist (ST) — that anyone could achieve in Government service, making him the first African American to ever attain such status in the Civilian Army workforce.

== Early life and education and training ==
Ruffin was born to Booker T. and Catherine Ruffin in Toxey, Alabama. A native of Gilbertown, Alabama, he attended the public schools of Choctaw County, Alabama. He received the undergraduate degree in physics from Alabama Agricultural and Mechanical University, Normal, Alabama in 1977. During the summer of 1976, Ruffin worked at the Fermi National Accelerator Laboratory in Batavia, Illinois (known as Fermilab) as an intern student where he investigated the fall-off of radiation in multi-legged labyrinths and measured radiation levels in beam lines using ionization chambers. He became the first African American to receive advanced degrees in physics from any post secondary school (higher education) in the State of Alabama when he received his master's degree in physics in 1982 and a PhD degree in physics in 1986 from the University of Alabama in Huntsville. He was the first person from Gilbertown, Alabama, to receive a doctorate in physics.

== Career ==
Ruffin began his professional career in industry as an associate member of the technical staff at Dynetics, Inc. in May 1977. He became a Government employee in October 1982 when he accepted employment with the U.S. Army Missile Command (NKA, United States Army Research, Development and Engineering Command). He professionally progressed from a bench scientist to a senior research scientist (ST), one of only 40 positions within the entire U.S. Army civilian workforce. Ruffin was the first civilian to be appointed senior research scientist for Micro-Sensors and Systems within the Army civilian workforce and the first African American to be promoted to this Senior Executive Service (SES)-level position. Ruffin and his team developed MEMS modeling design tools, along with MEMS device fabrication techniques and advanced laboratory facilities. His technical contributions and leadership in the inertial MEMS technology area raised the US Army's inertial MEMS design and development capabilities to global recognition.

Ruffin's research in Fiber Optic Communication, MEMS, and Nanotechnology resulted in eight patents, one book (co-editor), seven book chapters, and numerous peer-reviewed journal articles. His fiber winding patent solved the 20-year-old problem associated with adverse temperature effects on Fibre optic gyroscope (FOGs) performance. Ruffin published the advanced technologies for FOGs in Chapter 8, Pages 383 through 416 of the book entitled “Fiber Optics Sensors,” Marcel Dekker, Inc., 2002. He is the co-editor of the book “Fiber Optics Sensors: Second Edition,” CRC Press, 2007. Ruffin's precision sensing and treatment delivery device for promoting healing in living tissue patent revealed a minimal invasive technique for treating cancer patients.

== Honors and distinctions ==
Ruffin's achievements in applied science have been recognized with multiple prestigious awards including the Army Research and Development Achievement Award from the United States Secretary of the Army, the Black Engineer of the Year Special Recognition Award by the Council of Engineering Deans for Historically Black Universities, the Technologist of the Year Award from the National Society of Black Engineers, the Top Ten Army Materiel Command Personnel of the Year Award, the Material Acquisition/Technology Award from the American Defense Preparedness Association and Recognition for a Canadian Patent. On February 17, 2011, Ruffin was awarded the Black Engineer of the Year Emerald Award for Government Professional Achievement for his technical achievements and leadership in the advancement of Fiber Optics, Micro Electro-Mechanical Systems (MEMS), and Nanotechnology to ensure that the US Army remained at the forefront of a scientific and technological competence that is mission critical to the future soldier. In 2011, President Barack Obama bestowed upon Ruffin the Rank of Meritorious Senior Professional for sustained superior accomplishment in the conduct of programs of the U. S. Government and noteworthy achievement of quality and efficiency in public service. On June 29, 2011, the Secretary of the Army, Mr. John M. McHugh, presented Ruffin with the 2010 Presidential Rank Awards of Meritorious Executive. Ruffin was presented two Civilian Service Medal of the U. S. Federal Government for sustained meritorious service: the Department of the Army Decoration for Exceptional Civilian Service Medal and the Department of the Army Commander's Award for Civilian Service.

Ruffin received top awards from his Alma Maters. In May 2005, Ruffin was inducted into the Alabama A&M University Alumni Hall of Fame in Science for his lifetime technical contributions to the field of applied science. In July 2005, he was presented the William Hooper Council Alumni Award from the Progressive Alumni Chapter. In April 2003, he was presented the Alumni of Achievement Award from the University of Alabama in Huntsville and in April 2005 the College of Science presented him with the Distinguished Alumnus Award. Oakwood University in Huntsville, Alabama presented Ruffin with the United Negro College Fund (UNCF) Educator Award on April 9, 2009, during the 31st Annual UNCF Salute to Education Gala.

Ruffin has been featured in national journals such as the Black Engineer Magazine, the US Black Engineer Information Technology Magazine [8th Annual Homeland Security, Government and Defense Edition - Top Blacks in the Department of Defense Senior Executive Service (page 44)], Huntsville, Alabama Chamber of Commerce Initiatives Magazine Huntsville, Alabama Chamber of Commerce Initiatives Magazine (pages 13–14), COGIC Inspiration Today Magazine, and COGIC Be Well Today Magazine. Ruffin has been active in professional and scientific societies such as the International Society for Optical engineering, the Optical Society of America, the Institute of Navigation, and the National Society of Black Engineers since 1988. In 2005, he was promoted to the distinction of Fellow of SPIE International Society for Optical Engineering.

Ruffin has served the professional and technical communities by his mentoring of high-school and undergraduate students during the Army's summer intern programs, teaching physics and Optics courses at Alabama A&M University in his capacity as Adjunct Professor, and serving as the director of education for the Huntsville Association of Technical Societies (HATS) where he was responsible for designing science enrichment programs for K-12 students from 1998 to 2008. He served as director of the Dr. Paul B. Ruffin Math Tutoring Academy (named in his honor) – a science and math tutoring support activity initiated to assist K-9 students that reside in public housing in the Huntsville, Alabama area from 2004-2006. Ruffin conducted lectures/seminars to educate/motivate high school students participating in Science Fairs at the Sci.Quest, North Alabama Science Center and young college-age students participating in the National Science Foundation Workshop/Short Course on Sensor Science and Technology at Alabama A&M University for scientific pursuits.

Ruffin has served as the featured speaker at a number of public events including the 21st Annual Dr. Martin Luther King Jr. Memorial Breakfast held at Bishop State Community College in Mobile, Alabama sponsored by the Port City Chapter of Blacks In Government Inc. on Monday, January 18, 2010, the 3rd Annual Science, Technology, Engineering and Mathematics (STEM) Day “Increasing Global Competitiveness Through STEM” at Alabama A&M University on April 3, 2009.

== Personal ==
Ruffin is married to Vetrea Slack Ruffin, who is a national gospel recording artist. They have two daughters. They presently reside in the Huntsville/Tennessee Valley area.

Ruffin has served as the pastor of the Forge Temple Church of God in Christ in Birmingham, Alabama, since 2005. On 6 February 2012, he was presented the Pastoral Humanitarian Award by the Alabama People's Choice for his deeds in public service.
