= Bashi Formation =

Geologic formation in Alabama and Mississippi

- Stratigraphic range: Ypresian (Wasatchian); ~55–50 Ma
- Type: Formation

Lithology
- Primary: Marl

Location
- Coordinates: 32.4°N 88.7°W
- Approximate paleocoordinates: 34.5°N 74.1°W
- Region: Alabama, Mississippi
- Country: United States
- Bashi Formation (the United States) Bashi Formation (Mississippi)

The Bashi Formation is a geologic formation in Alabama and Mississippi. It is named for Bashi Creek in northern Clarke County, Alabama, which cuts through some of its exposures. It preserves fossils dating back to the Eocene period, or Wasatchian in the NALMA classification.

== Fossil content ==
The following fossils have been reported from the formation:

Reptiles

- Palaeophis cf. littoralis
- Palaeophis virginianus

Fish

- Coupatezia woutersi
- Dasyatis tricuspidatus
- Myliobatis dixoni
- Archaeomanta melenhorsti
- Burnhamia daviesi
- Burnhamia fetahi
- Meridiania convexa
- Platyrhina dockeryi
- Rhinobatos sp.
- Eotorpedo jaeckeli
- Striatolamia macrota
- Anomotodon sp.
- Cretolamna aschersoni
- Cretolamna lerichei
- Odontaspis borodini
- Odontaspis speyeri
- Odontaspis winkleri
- Pseudodontaspis lauderdalensis
- Brachycarcharias mississippiensis
- Physogaleus americanus & tertius
- Abdounia subulidens
- Abdounia beaugei
- Galeus sp.
- Microscyliorhinus leggetti
- Scyliorhinus gilberti
- Galeorhinus affini
- Galeorhinus minor
- Heterodontus sowasheense
- Ginglymostoma subafricanum
- Nebrius thielensis
- Conger meridies

== See also ==
- List of fossiliferous stratigraphic units in Alabama
- Paleontology in Alabama
