= Wyonycteris =

Wyonycteris Temporal range: Thanetian-Ypresian ~58.5–50.3 Ma

Scientific classification
- Domain: Eukaryota
- Kingdom: Animalia
- Phylum: Chordata
- Class: Mammalia
- Order: Lipotyphla
- Suborder: Soricomorpha
- Family: †Nyctitheriidae
- Subfamily: †Placentidentinae
- Genus: †Wyonycteris; Gingerich 1987

Type species
- †Wyonycteris chalix Gingerich 1987

Species
- †Wyonycteris chalix Gingerich 1987; †Wyonycteris galensis Secord 2008; †Wyonycteris kingi Hooker 2018; †Wyonycteris microtis Secord 2008; †Wyonycteris primitivus Beard and Dawson 2009; †Wyonycteris richardi Smith 1995

Extinct family of mammals

Wyonycteris is a genus of small mammals that existed in the late Paleocene and early Eocene epochs. The type species is Wyonycteris chalix, which lived in Wyoming during the Clarkforkian North American Land Mammal Age of the Paleocene and was originally proposed to be an early form of insectivorous bat. Later re-examination of the material has put this alliance in doubt, and the genus has instead been proposed as belonging to the subfamily Placentidentinae, within the family Nyctitheriidae. Similar fossil material of the same time period found in Europe was later discovered and described as new species, Wyonycteris richardi.

Secord (2008) described the first known species of Wyonycteris from the Tiffanian NALMA, Wyonycteris galensis and W. microtis, although the status of both species as members of Wyonycteris has been questioned. The two largest species, W. primitivus and W. kingi, are known from the early Eocene of Mississippi and England, respectively.

== Evolutionary relationships ==
Wyonycteris is only known from dental remains. It is characterized by W-shaped crests on the outer side of the upper molars, a trait that it shares with most insectivorous bats. However, Wyonycteris possesses a number of additional cusps on the upper molars that are not present in bats leading many researchers to conclude that it is more closely related to the extinct insectivorous family Nyctitheriidae. A recent phylogenetic analysis found most species of Wyonycteris to be within the family Nyctitheriidae, most closely related to the genus Pontifactor. Wyonycteris microtis was found to be very distantly related to the other species of Wyonycteris, outside the family Nyctitheriidae and more closely related mammal to bats alongside genus Eosoricodon.

Rose et al. (2012) compared Wyonycteris to the genus Plagioctenoides and concluded that the two may in fact belong to the same genus. If this is the case, the correct genus name would be Plagioctenoides since it was formally named first.

== Distribution ==
Paleocene

- Tiffanian
  - Polecat Bench Formation, Wyoming
- Clarkforkian
  - Willwood Formation, Wyoming

Eocene

- Tienen Formation, Belgium
- Woolwich and Blackheath Beds Formations, England
- Argiles d'lignite du Soissonnais Formation, France
- Wasatchian
  - Tuscahoma Formation, Mississippi
  - Wasatch and Willwood Formations, Wyoming
