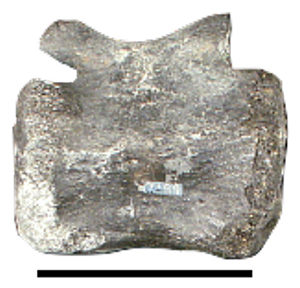
- Lectotype caudal vertebra of H. crassicauda

Scientific classification
- Kingdom: Animalia
- Phylum: Chordata
- Class: Reptilia
- Clade: Dinosauria
- Clade: †Ornithischia
- Clade: †Ornithopoda
- Superfamily: †Hadrosauroidea
- Genus: †Hypsibema; Cope, 1869

Type species
- †Hypsibema crassicauda Cope, 1869

Species
- Hypsibema missouriensis? (Gilmore, 1945)

Synonyms
- Parrosaurus? (Gilmore, 1945)

= Hypsibema =

Hypsibema Temporal range: Late Cretaceous, Campanian

Extinct genus of dinosaurs

Hypsibema is an extinct genus of very large basal hadrosauroid dinosaur from the Late Cretaceous (Campanian) of eastern North America. The type species is H. crassicauda, with a potential second species in H. missouriensis (now generally placed in its own genus, Parrosaurus). Most remains of H. crassicauda, including the type specimen, are known from the Tar Heel Formation of North Carolina, in addition to some remains known from the Marshalltown Formation of New Jersey.

== Discovery and naming ==
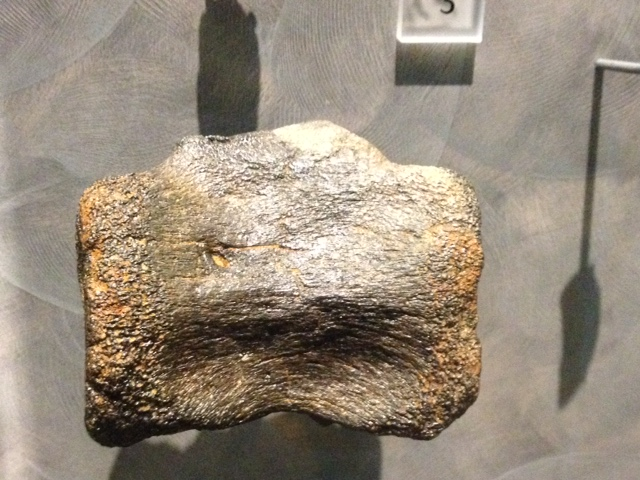
Assigned vertebra of H. crassicauda, North Carolina Museum of Natural Sciences

The type species, Hypsibema crassicauda, was described by Edward Drinker Cope, and was found in Sampson County, North Carolina in 1869. The generic name is derived from Greek hypsi, "high", and bema, "step", as Cope believed that the species walked particularly erect on its toes. The specific name means "with a fat tail" in Latin. The syntypic series, USNM 7189, originally consisted of a caudal vertebra, a metatarsal, and two femoral fragments that were originally identified as humeral and tibial fragments, all found in 1869 by North Carolina state geologist professor Washington Carruthers Kerr in the Black Creek Group of North Carolina. A second vertebra referred to the species, USNM 6136, was later discovered by Edward Wilber Berry and referred to H. crassicauda in 1942. In their 1979 review of dinosaur remains from the Black Creek Group, Baird and Horner (1979) noted that the femoral fragments come from a tyrannosauroid similar to Dryptosaurus, and made the caudal vertebra included in the syntype series of H. crassicauda the lectotype, while stating that the metatarsal could not belong to the same individual as the caudal. Remains assignable to H. crassicauda have also been reported from the Ellisdale Fossil Site of New Jersey.

A second species, initially placed into the genus Parrosaurus in 1945 was considered a species of Hypsibema, H. missouriensis by Donald Baird and Jack Horner in 1979, and since 2004 the official state dinosaur of Missouri. It was considered dubious in both editions of the Dinosauria, although Chase Brownstein considers Parrosaurus valid and distinct from Hypsibema based on new discoveries at the holotype site.

It has sometimes been theorized that Hypsibema represents an adult Hadrosaurus, which it coexisted with at the sites where it is known, but morphological differences, especially in the vertebrae, support both being distinct taxa.

== Description ==
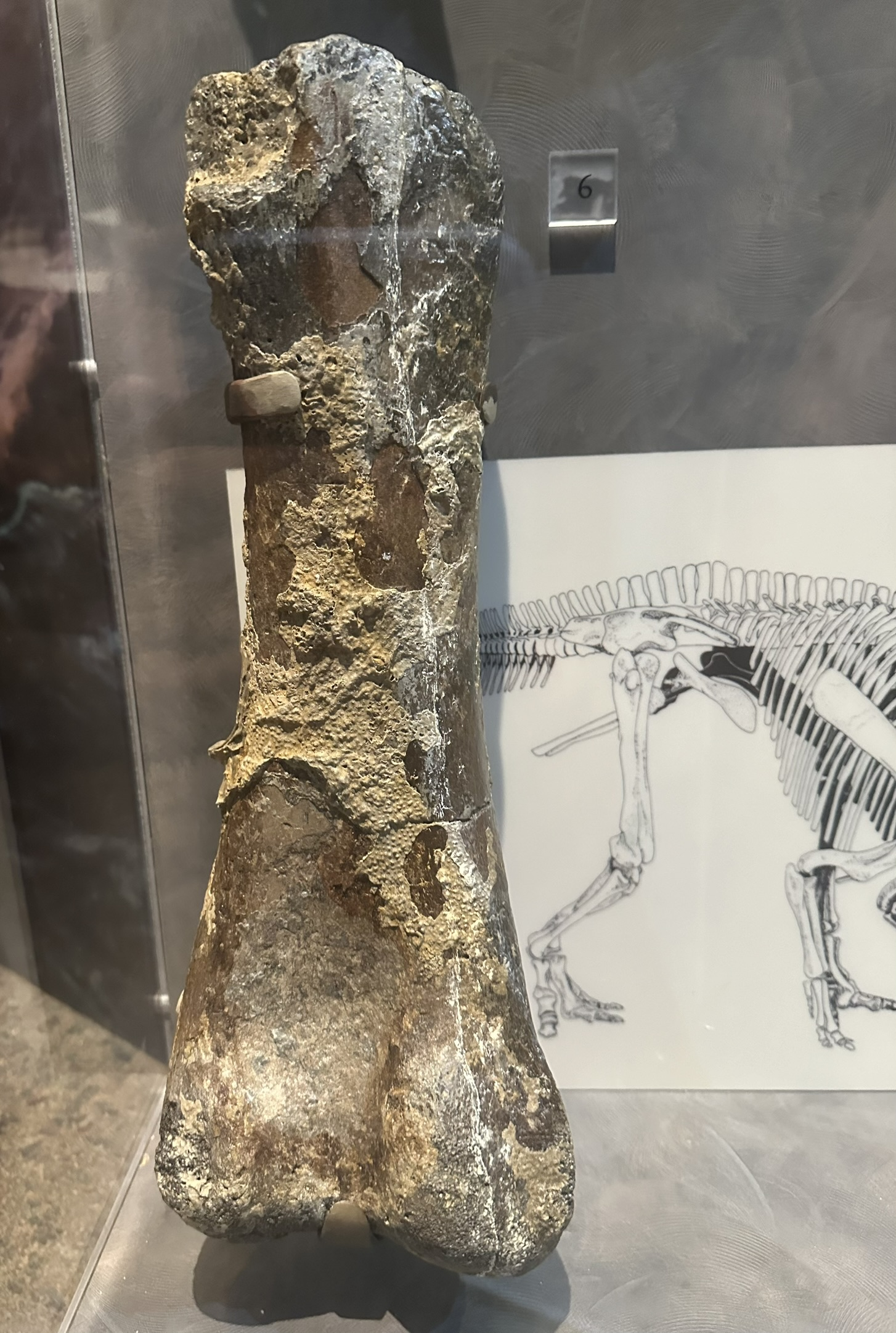
The giant hadrosaur humerus described by Baird & Horner (1979) at the North Carolina Museum of Natural Sciences, which may potentially belong to H. crassicauda

Though known from fragmentary remains, Hypsibema appears to have been a gigantic hadrosauroid, based on the proportions of its vertebrae and humeri compared to those of better-known hadrosaurs. A very large partial humerus described from North Carolina by Baird & Horner has been estimated to belong to an individual at least 12 metres (39 ft) in length, and the species overall may have reached lengths of 12 to 17 metres (39 to 56 ft). Alongside Parrosaurus, it is unique for its massively constructed tail, which the specific epithet derives from.

== Paleoecology ==
Based on its occurrence in both North Carolina and New Jersey, Hypsibema appears to have had a wide distribution across the landmass of Appalachia, a trait shared by many other dinosaurs known from eastern North America. In both regions, it co-occurred with the hadrosaurid Hadrosaurus, the tyrannosauroid Dryptosaurus, and an ornithomimosaur (with the New Jersey specimens assigned to Coelosaurus). In North Carolina, it also occurred with the hadrosauroid Lophorhothon, the tyrannosauroid Appalachiosaurus, the dromaeosaurid Saurornitholestes, and an indeterminate leptoceratopsid, while in New Jersey, it co-occurred with indeterminate nodosaurids. All these dinosaurs coexisted with the gigantic alligatoroid Deinosuchus, which may have replaced large-sized theropods as the top predator of the Appalachian coastal plains.

The very large size achieved by Hypsibema and its relative/junior synonym, Parrosaurus, may owe to the lack of sauropod dinosaurs on Appalachia from the Late Cretaceous onwards, allowing for hadrosauroids to evolve gigantic sizes and fill in their ecological niche.

== See also ==
- Timeline of hadrosaur research
