= Ripley Formation =

Geological formation in the southern United States

- Stratigraphic range: Upper Cretaceous
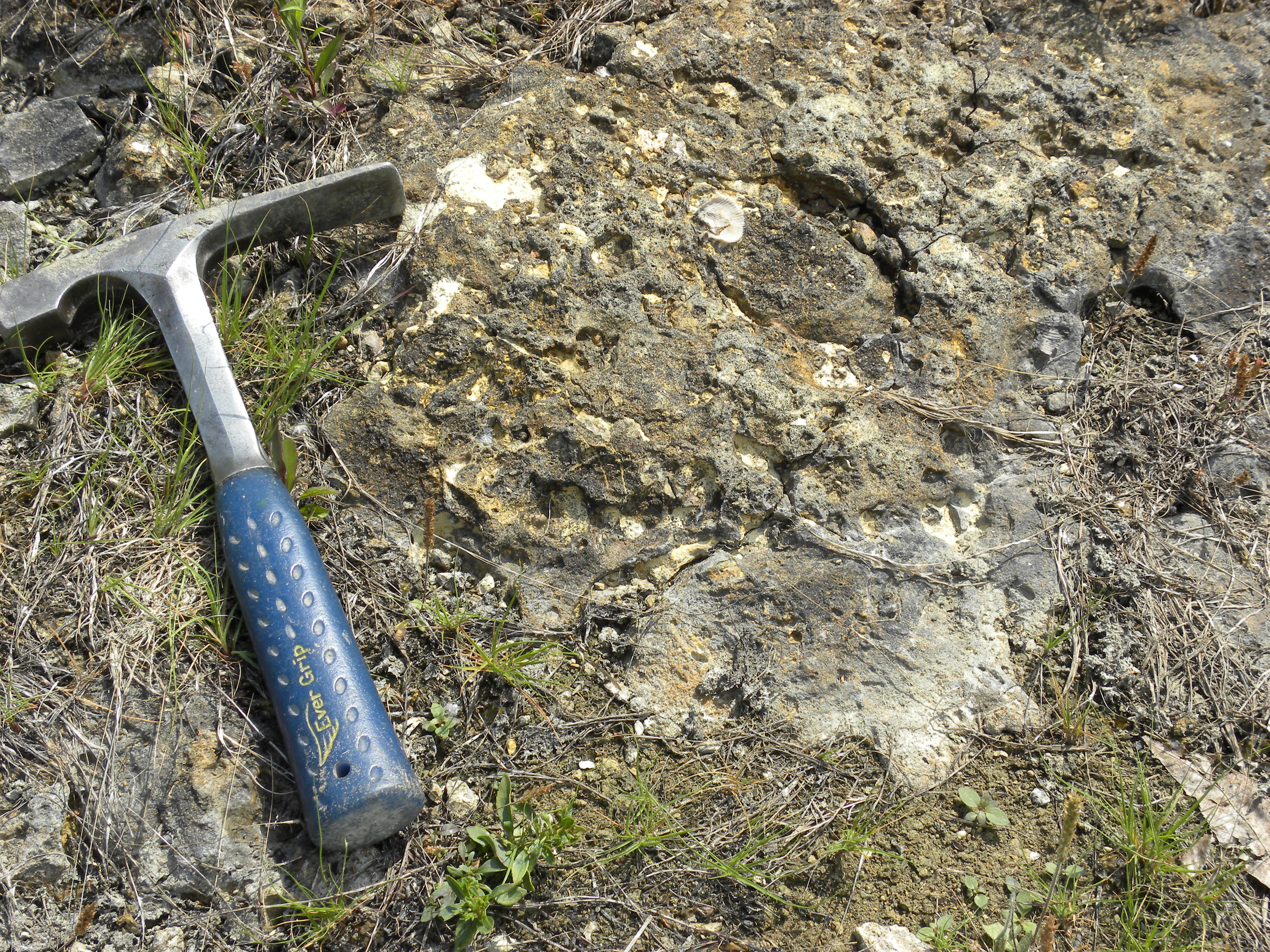
- Rockground exposed in the Ripley Formation near Greenville, Alabama.
- Type: Geological formation
- Unit of: Selma Group
- Sub-units: Cusseta Sand Member, McNairy Sand Member (Chronister dinosaur site)
- Underlies: Prairie Bluff Chalk Formation
- Overlies: Demopolis Chalk Formation
- Thickness: 40 m (130 ft) to 175 m (574 ft)

Lithology
- Primary: Glauconitic sandstone
- Other: Micaceous chalk

Location
- Region: Alabama, Georgia, Mississippi, Missouri, Tennessee
- Country: United States

Type section
- Named for: Ripley, Mississippi

The Ripley Formation is a geological formation in North America found in the U.S. states of Alabama, Georgia, Mississippi, Missouri, and Tennessee. The lithology is consistent throughout the layer. It consists mainly of glauconitic sandstone. It was formed by sediments deposited during the Maastrichtian stage of the Late Cretaceous. It is a unit of the Selma Group and consists of the Cusseta Sand Member, McNairy Sand Member and an unnamed lower member. It has not been extensively studied by vertebrate paleontologists, due to a lack of accessible exposures. However, fossils have been unearthed including crocodile, hadrosaur, nodosaur, tyrannosaur, ornithomimid, dromaeosaur, and mosasaur remains have been recovered from the Ripley Formation.

== Paleofauna ==
- Hypsibema missouriensis (hadrosaurid) – "Caudal vertebrae, fragmentary dentary and predentary."
- cf. Gryposaurus sp.
- Nodosauridae sp.
- Tyrannosauroidea sp.
- cf. Albertosaurus sp.
- Dromaeosauridae sp.
- Possible Ornithomimidae indet.
- Eothoracosaurus mississippiensis
- Thoracosaurus neocesariensis
- Leidyosuchus sp.
- Adocus punctatus
- Naomichelys speciosa
- Trionyx sp.
- Habrosaurus sp.
- Amiidae sp.
- Lepisosteus sp.
- Platacodon nanus

== See also ==
- List of dinosaur-bearing rock formations
- List of fossil sites
