= Pottsville Formation =

Bedrock unit in the Appalachian Mountains of North America

- Stratigraphic range: Pennsylvanian
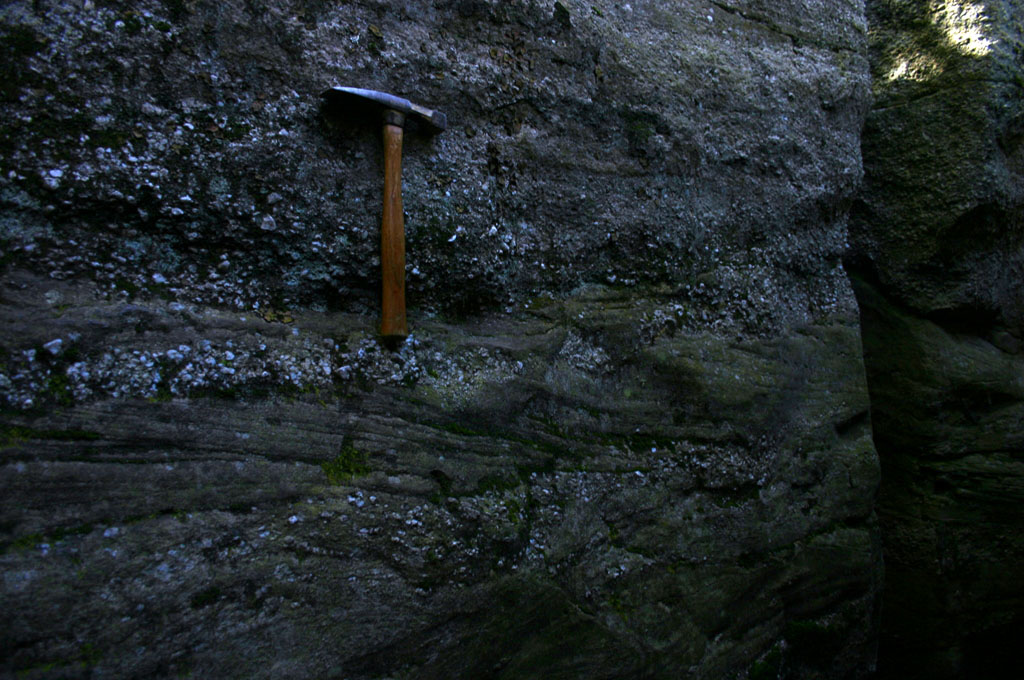
- Typical Pottsville Formation at Worlds End State Park, Sullivan County, Pennsylvania
- Type: sedimentary
- Sub-units: see Stratigraphy section
- Underlies: Brookville Coal of Allegheny Formation (OH, PA) Llewellyn Formation
- Overlies: Coldwater Shale, Cuyahoga Formation, Logan Formation, Mauch Chunk Formation, Maxville Limestone, and Parkwood Formation

Lithology
- Primary: sandstone, conglomerate
- Other: limestone, shale, coal

Location
- Region: Appalachian Mountains
- Extent: Alabama, Maryland, Mississippi, Ohio, Pennsylvania, and West Virginia

Type section
- Named for: Pottsville, Pennsylvania
- Named by: J. P. Lesley, 1876

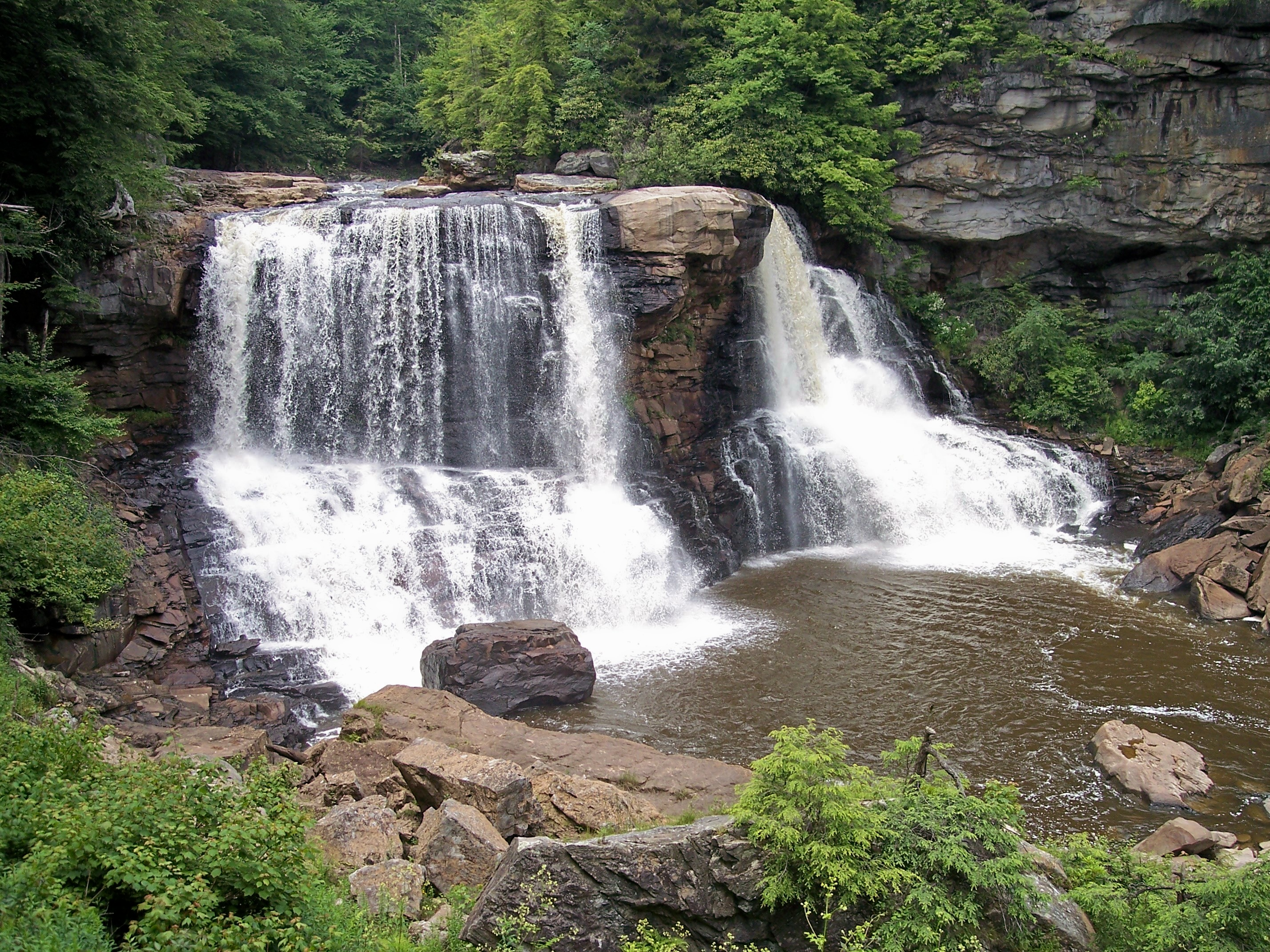
Blackwater Falls in West Virginia. The major ledge is Connoquenessing sandstone of the Middle Pottsville Formation.

The Pennsylvanian Pottsville Formation is a mapped bedrock unit in Pennsylvania, western Maryland, West Virginia, Ohio, and Alabama. It is a major ridge-former in the Ridge-and-Valley Appalachians of the eastern United States. The Pottsville Formation is conspicuous at many sites along the Allegheny Front, the eastern escarpment of the Allegheny or Appalachian Plateau.

== Description ==
The Pottsville Formation consists of a gray conglomerate, fine to coarse grained sandstone, and is known to contain limestone, siltstone and shale, as well as anthracite and bituminous coal. It is considered a classic orogenic molasse. The formation was first described from a railroad cut south of Pottsville, Pennsylvania.

=== Nomenclature and stratigraphy ===
The relationship to the term "Pottsville" and actual lithologic units is complex. Most fundamentally, the unit may be considered a formation or a group.

As a formation, the Pottsville may encompass the following members depending on the state in which it occurs: Alton Coal Member, Anthony Shale Member, Bear Run Member, Bedford Clay Bed, Boggs Member, Boyles Sandstone Member, Bremen Sandstone Member, Brookville Clay Member, Camp Branch Sandstone Member, Campbell Ledge Shale Member, Chestnut Sandstone Member, Connoquenessing Sandstone Member, Dundee Sandstone Member, Flint Ridge Clay Bed or Flint Ridge Shale Member, Harrison Member, Homewood Sandstone Member, Huckleberry Clay Bed, Kanawha Member, Lick Creek Sandstone Member, Lowellville Limestone Member, Lower Mercer Limestone Member, Massillon Sandstone Member, McArthur Member, Mercer Member, Middle Mercer Shale Member, Mount Savage Clay Bed, Olean Conglomerate Member of Olean Sandstone Member, Pine Sandstone Member, Poverty Run Member, Razburg Sandstone Member, Rocky Ridge Sandstone Member, Schuylkill Member, Sciotoville Clay Member, Shades Sandstone Member, Sharon Coal Bed, Sharon Member, Sharp Mountain Member, Straight Ridge Sandstone Member, Straven Conglomerate Member, Tionesta Clay Bed, Tumbling Run Member, Upper Mercer Limestone Member or Upper Mercer Bed, Vandusen Shale Member, Wolf Ridge Sandstone Member.

As a group, the Pottsville may encompass the following formations depending on the state in which it occurs: Connoquenessing Formation, Curwensville Formation, Elliott Park Formation, Gurnee Formation, Hance Formation, Homewood Formation or Homewood Sandstone, Mercer Formation, New River Formation, Olean Conglomerate or Olean Formation, Pocahontas Formation, Schuylkill Formation, Sharon Formation or Sharon Sandstone, Sharp Mountain Formation, Tumbling Run Formation.

The Pottsville was previously mapped in the Illinois basin as well at the Formation level, but was renamed the Tradewater Formation in 1997.

=== Fossils ===
A 1.3-m interval at the base of the Pottsville in the Broad Top basin in Pennsylvania contains both marine invertebrates and plant fossils of middle Morrowan age.

== Age ==
Relative age dating of the Pottsville places it in the Early to Middle Pennsylvanian period.

== Notable exposures ==
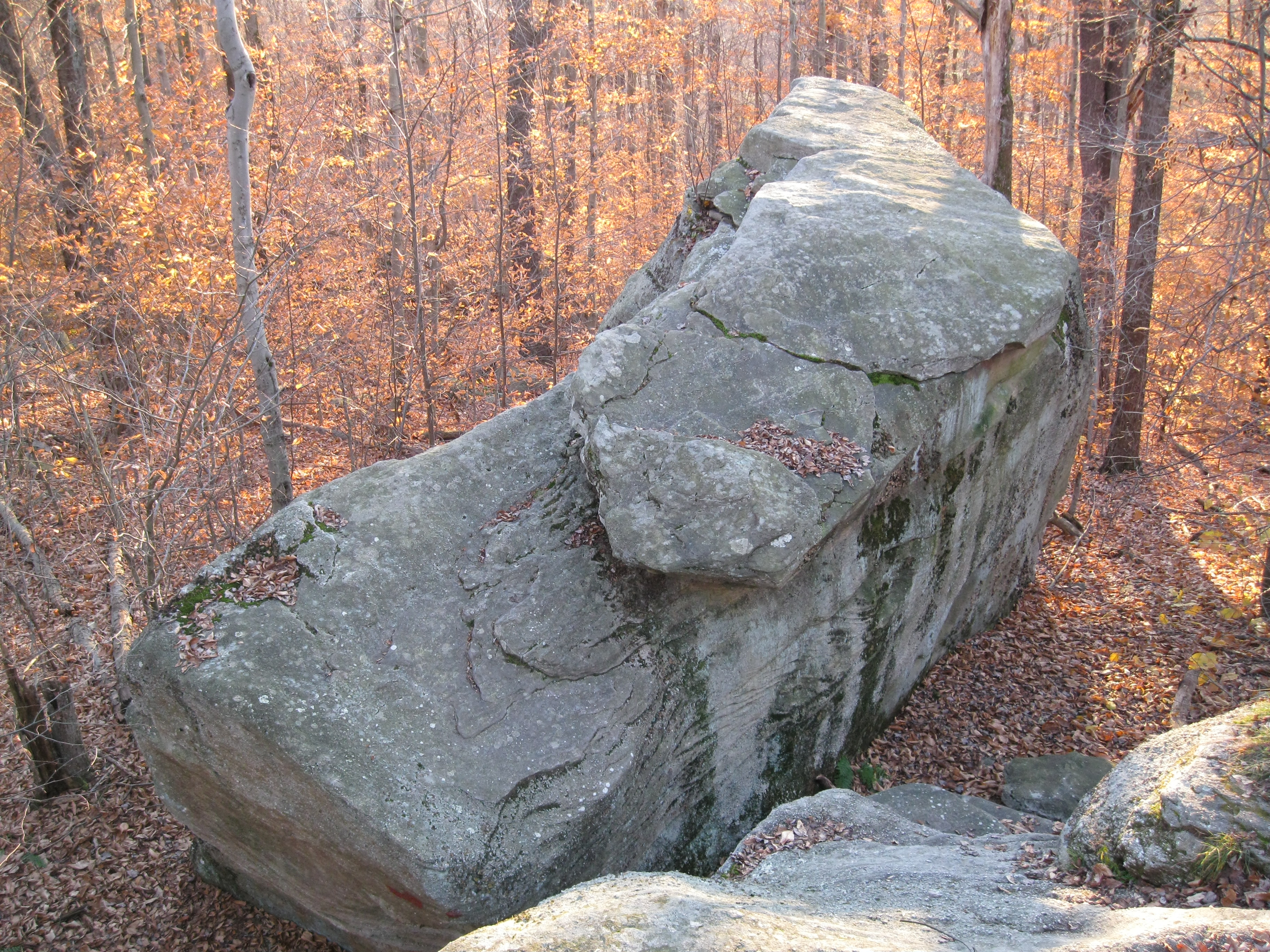
Pottsville Formation boulder in the Rock Garden in Worlds End State Park

Pennsylvania:

- Bilger's Rocks
- Worlds End State Park

Maryland:

- Dans Rock, on Dans Mountain

West Virginia:

- Bear Rocks Preserve, Dolly Sods
- Blackwater Falls and the Blackwater Canyon
- Canaan Valley (surrounding mountains)
- Cheat River Gorge
- Spruce Knob

Ohio:

- Thompson Ledges in Thompson Township, Geauga County, Ohio

== See also ==
- Carboniferous Ohio
- Carboniferous Pennsylvania
- Carboniferous West Virginia
- Pennsylvanian North America
- Upper Mercer flint
