= Winifred McGlamery =

American geologist and palenontologist

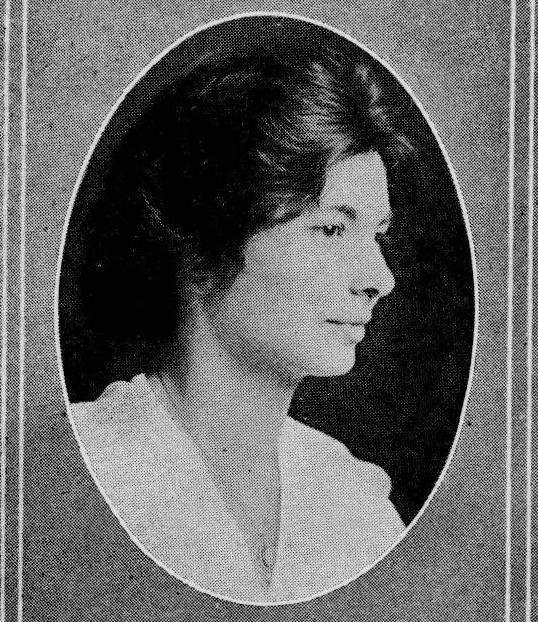
- Born: July 26, 1887; Churchville
- Died: April 2, 1977 (aged 89)
- Alma mater: University of North Carolina at Chapel Hill; Goucher College; Johns Hopkins University
- Occupation: Geologist, paleontologist

Winifred McGlamery (July 26, 1887 – April 2, 1977) was an American geologist and paleontologist, known for her contributions to Alabama paleontology and oil and gas exploration.

== Personal life ==
Josie Winifred "Winnie" McGlamery was born on July 26, 1887, in Churchville, Virginia, to Rudolph Fayette and Mary Jane (Jackson) McGlamery. McGlamery was one of seven siblings, and after the death of her mother in 1895 and her father in 1898, was sent to live with her grandparents, James W. and Elizabeth Jackson. McGlamery continued to pursue her education, completing high school and eventually teaching stenography at Butcher's Business College in Beaver Falls, Pennsylvania. Before her years as an academic and geologist, McGlamery moved frequently and worked various jobs around the country, most notably as a private secretary and bookkeeper for the president of Elizabeth College in North Carolina.

McGlamery went to the University of North Carolina at Chapel Hill from 1915 to 1918 and transferred to Goucher College where she majored in English, graduating in 1919. After graduating, she enrolled into the geology graduate program at Johns Hopkins University, and completed her studies in 1925. It was during her time here at Johns Hopkins that she would meet Walter B. Jones, an influential figure in geology, who would go on to become Alabama's State Geologist in 1927. Scientists such as Florence Bascom and Edward Wilber Berry are said to have had strong influences affecting her pursuit of geology, however, a direct and personal relationship to Bascom has never been confirmed. Beyond geology, McGlamery was an avid fan of horseback riding and exploring the countryside. Both interests aided her skills and knowledge during her time as a field researcher in the 1930s.

McGlamery officially retired by 1970 at the age of 83, and died in 1977 at the LaRocca Nursing home.

== Career ==
Following her graduation from Johns Hopkins University McGlamery became a both a professional micropaleontologist with the Humble Oil and Refining Company, and a paleontologist for the American Museum of Natural History and for the University of Rochester's Museum. In 1931, at 44 years of age, Walter Jones reached out to McGlamery and offered her the position of librarian at the Alabama Museum of Natural History. McGlamery enjoyed this position for over a year, but due to the Great Depression, funds for government employees of Alabama had run out, often leaving McGlamery with little to no income. Soon after this, McGlamery joined the Geological Survey of Alabama as paleontologist after the passing of the Survey's previous paleontologist, Truman H. Aldrich.

She was employed as paleontologist for over 10 years at the Geological Survey of Alabama, and was a member of the geological survey for 30 years. During her employment on the Survey, she primarily logged well samples and identified and labeled various index fossils. In 1934, after the rediscovery of Little Stave Creek, a middle Eocene site, McGlamery obtained high status within the American geology field, and was soon employed as geologist for the State Oil and Gas Board of Alabama. McGlamery's most notable and principal contributions to the paleontology and stratigraphy fields were her well descriptions and contributions to the fossil collection.

McGlamery was involved in a number of geological societies, namely the Paleontological Society of America, the American Association of Petroleum Geologists, the American Malacological Union, the Alabama Academy of Science, the Society of Economic Geologists, the Mississippi Geological Society and was made a Fellow of the Geological Society of America.

McGlamery co-authored several publications with her coworker and fellow micropaleontologist, Joseph Cushman and made multiple contributions to the journal, Alabama Academy of Science. McGlamery officially retired from the State Survey in 1961, but was still active in within the University of Alabama. After this retirement, McGlamery continued working as a consultant for micropaleontology for seven years for the State Oil and Gas Board, where she consulted part-time within her home until her retirement in 1970.
