= Prairie Bluff Chalk =

Formation in Alabama and Mississippi, United States

- Stratigraphic range: Cretaceous
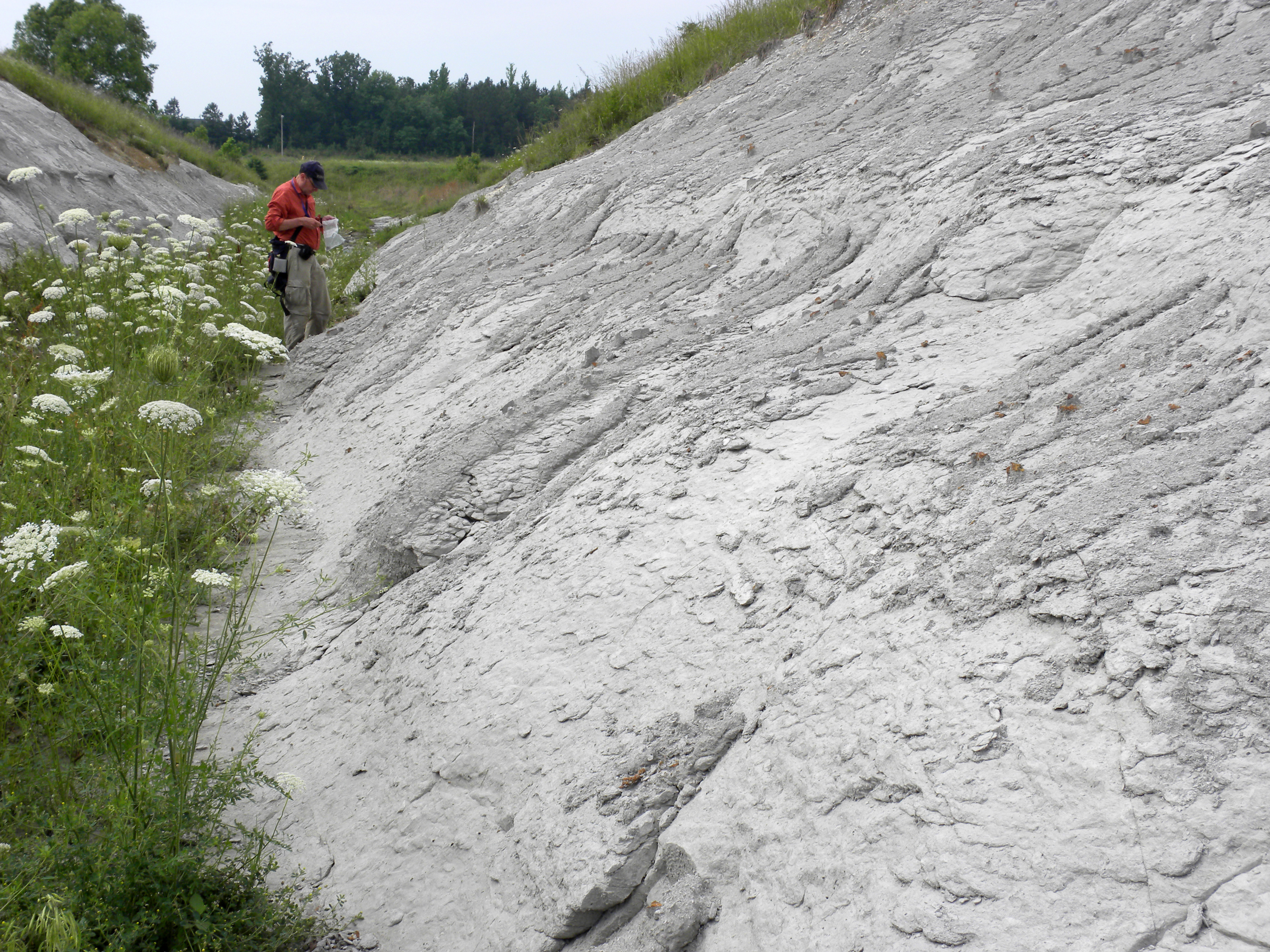
- Prairie Bluff Chalk Formation (Starkville, Mississippi)
- Type: Formation
- Unit of: Selma Group

Lithology
- Primary: Chalk

Location
- Region: Alabama, Mississippi
- Country: United States

The Prairie Bluff Chalk is a geologic formation in Alabama and Mississippi. It preserves fossils dating back to the Cretaceous period.

The chalk was formed by marine sediments deposited along the eastern edge of the Mississippi embayment during the Maastrichtian stage of the Late Cretaceous. It is a unit of the Selma Group and marks the end of the Cretaceous in Alabama. Evidence has been found within the formation at Braggs, Moscow, and Millers Ferry in Alabama indicating an instantaneous to brief erosional event, most likely a tsunami, at the Cretaceous–Paleogene boundary (K–T boundary). It is hypothesized that this event, along with faulting and liquification of the Prairie Bluff Chalk, is related to the meteorite impact at the Chicxulub crater site, directly south, across the Gulf of Mexico, from the formation.

== See also ==
- List of fossil sites
  - List of fossiliferous stratigraphic units in Alabama
  - List of fossiliferous stratigraphic units in Mississippi
- Paleontology in Alabama
- Paleontology in Mississippi
