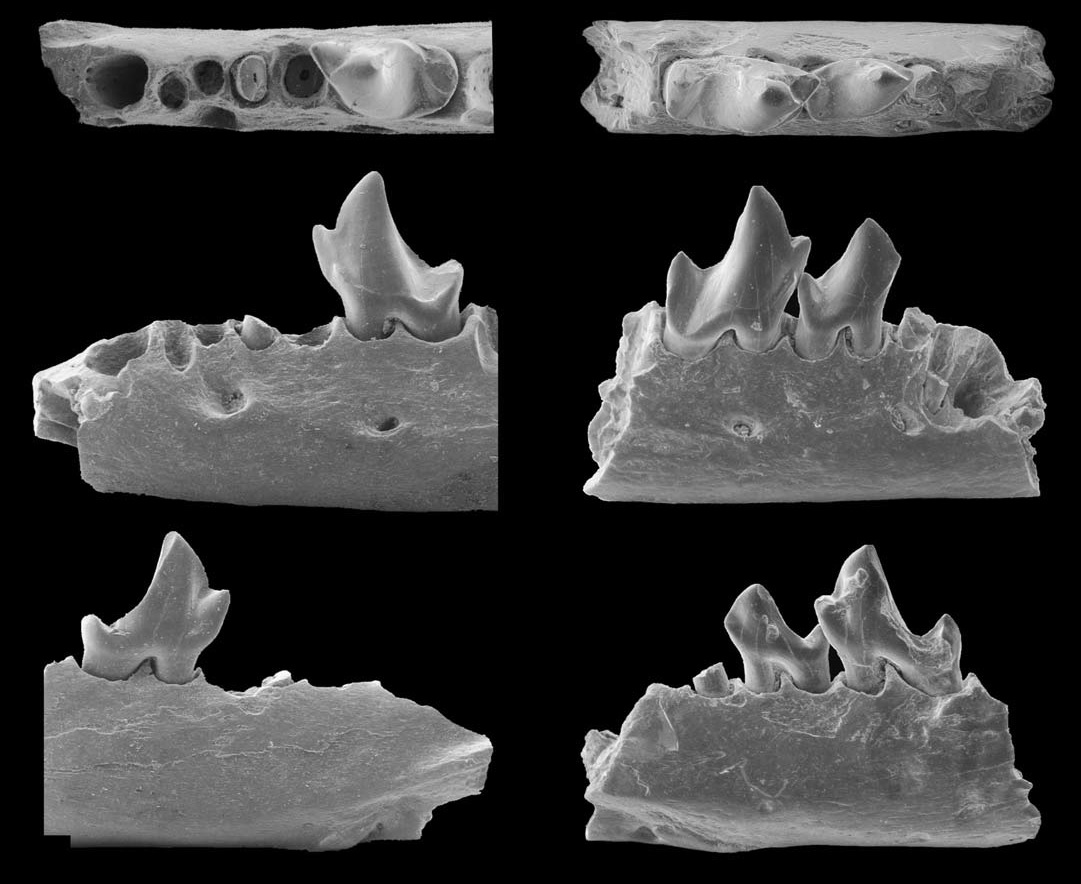
- SEM images of teeth and mandible fragments of Asionyctia guoi. From Missiaen and Smith, 2005.

Scientific classification
- Kingdom: Animalia
- Phylum: Chordata
- Class: Mammalia
- Order: Lipotyphla
- Suborder: Soricomorpha
- Family: †Nyctitheriidae; Simpson, 1928

Subfamilies
- †Amphidozotheriinae Sigé, 1976; †Amphidozotherium; †Darbonetus; †Paradoxonycteris; †Asionyctiinae Missiaen and Smith, 2005; †Asionyctia; †Bayanulanius; †Edzenius; †Oedolius; †Eosoricodontinae Lopatin, 2005; †Eosoricodon; †Nyctitheriinae Simpson, 1928; †Cryptotopos; †Euronyctia; †Leptacodon; †Limaconyssus?; †Nyctitherium; †Oligonyctia; †Plagioctenodon; †Saturninia; †Scraeva; †Sigenyctia; †Yuanqulestes?; †Placentidentinae Russell et al., 1973; †Ceutholestes; †Placentidens; †Plagioctenoides; †Pontifactor; †Remiculus; †Wyonycteris; †Praolestinae Lopatin, 2006; †Bumbanius; †Praolestes; †Talpilestinae Tong and Wang, 2006; †Talpilestes

= Nyctitheriidae =

Nyctitheriidae Temporal range: Early Paleocene–Early Oligocene

Family of extinct eulipotyphlan insectivores from the Paleocene and Eocene

Nyctitheriidae is a family of extinct eulipotyphlan insectivores known from the Paleocene and Eocene epochs of North America and Asia and persisting into the Oligocene of Europe. Several genera, including Nyctitherium, Paradoxonycteris, and Wyonycteris, have initially been described as bats, although the family is more frequently placed in the order Eulipotyphla.

== Origins and discovery ==
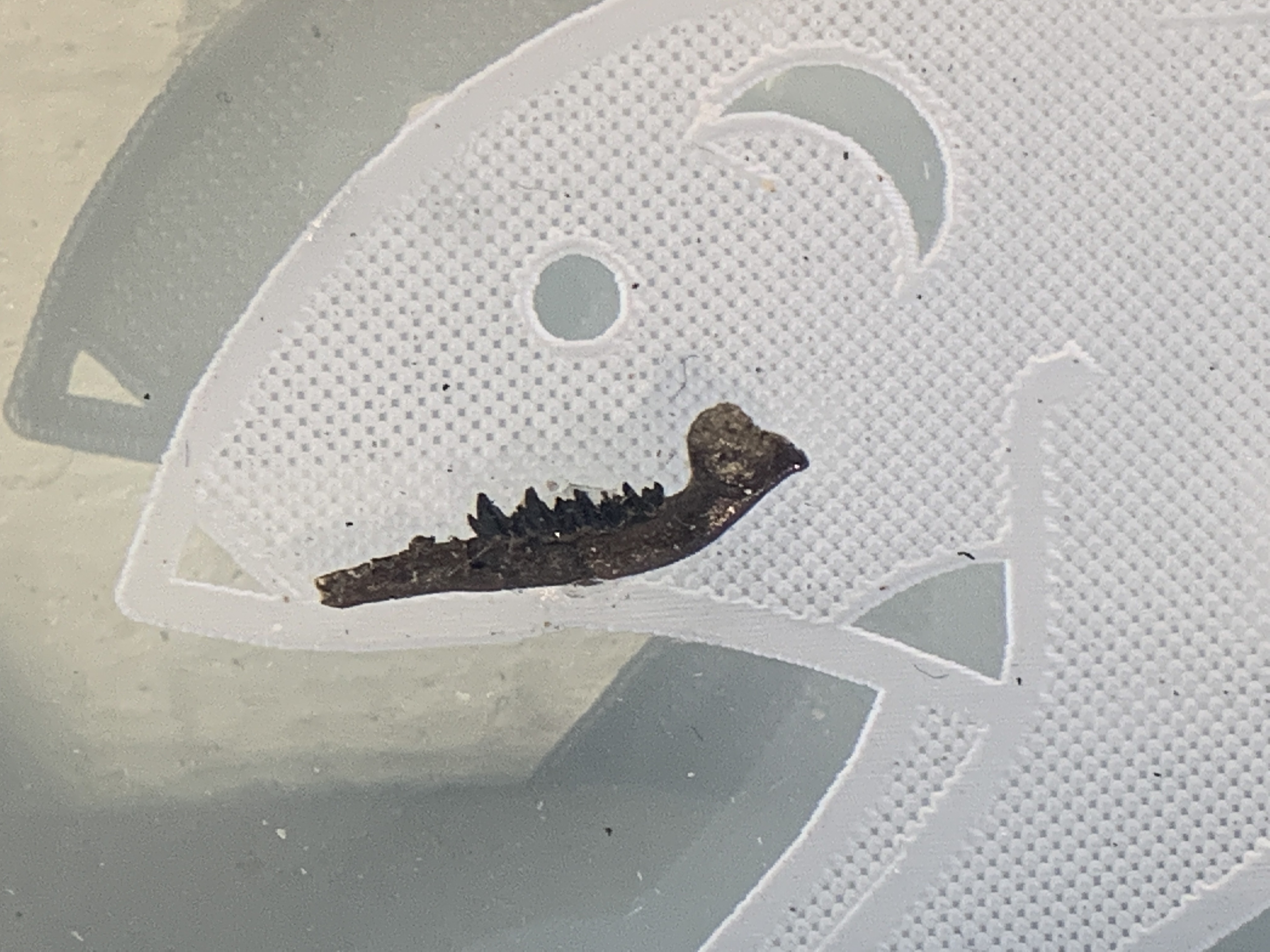
Leptacodon sp. from the early Paleocene (61 Mya).

O.C. Marsh originally described Nyctitherium, from the Eocene of Wyoming, as an early bat based on similarities of its teeth. Since 1872 more than two dozen other genera of nyctitheriids have been named, and several of these have also initially been considered bats. G.G. Simpson recognized that Nyctitherium did not represent a bat, and in 1928 named the family Nyctitheriidae for Nyctitherium and several other small insectivores.

Many additional species of Nyctitheriidae from Asia, Europe, and North America have been recognized in the subsequent decades. Most species are known only from isolated teeth and jaw fragments, however species of Cryptotopos, Euronyctia, Plagioctenodon, and Scraeva are known from some postcranial bones.

== Evolutionary relationships ==
A recent phylogenetic analysis placed Nyctitheriidae within Eulipotyphla, although Hooker (2001, 2014) has argued based on similarities in the limb bones for a relationship with Euarchonta, instead.

Lopatin (2006) recognized five subfamilies of Nyctitheriidae: Amphidozotheriinae, Asionyctiinae, Eosoricodontinae, Nyctitheriinae, and Praolestinae. Beard and Dawson (2009) considered Placentidentinae, previously thought to be related to Dermoptera, to also represent a subfamily within Nyctitheriidae. A phylogenetic analysis of many nyctitheriid species determined that although Nyctitheriidae was mostly monophyletic several subfamilies and genera were not. Notably, the subfamilies Amphidozotheriinae, Asionyctiinae, and Nyctitheriinae, as well as the genera Leptacodon and Saturninia, were found to be paraphyletic.
