= Selma Group =

Geological formation in North America

- Stratigraphic range: Upper Cretaceous
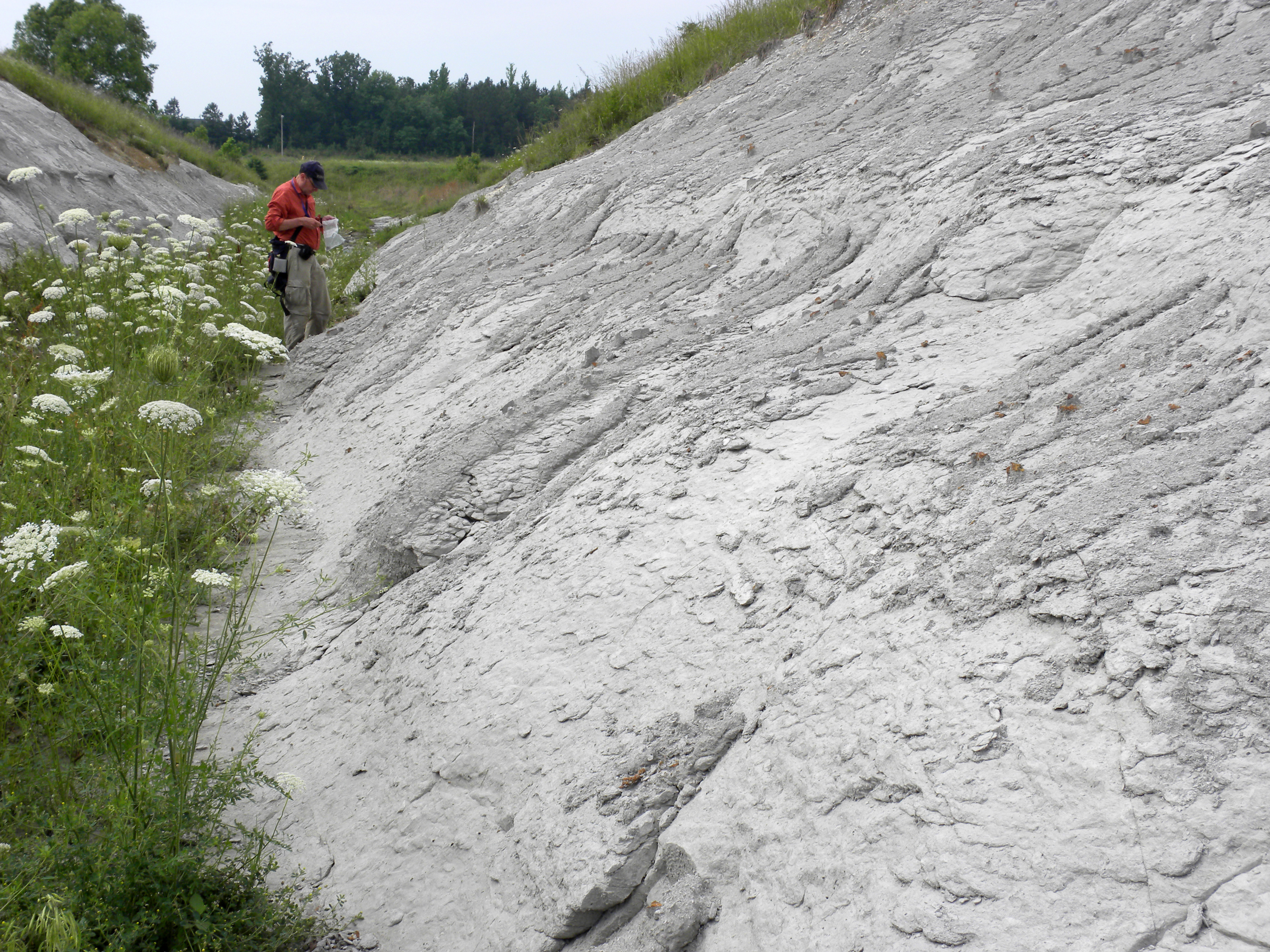
- Prairie Bluff Chalk Formation of the Selma Group exposed in Starkville, Mississippi.
- Type: Geological formation
- Sub-units: Mooreville Chalk Formation; Demopolis Chalk Formation; Ripley Formation; Prairie Bluff Chalk Formation
- Underlies: Midway Group
- Overlies: Eutaw Formation

Lithology
- Primary: Chalk
- Other: Glauconitic sandstone

Location
- Region: Alabama, Georgia, Mississippi, Tennessee
- Country: United States

Type section
- Named for: Selma, Alabama

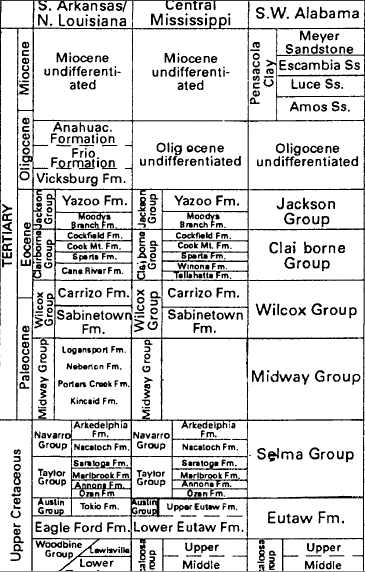
Stratigraphic column for the Selma

The Selma Group is a geological group in North America, within the U.S. states of Alabama, Mississippi, and Tennessee. The strata date from the Santonian to the Maastrichtian stages of the Late Cretaceous. The group is composed of, in ascending order, the Mooreville Chalk Formation, Demopolis Chalk Formation, Ripley Formation, and Prairie Bluff Chalk Formation. Dinosaur and mosasaur remains are among the fossils that have been recovered from the Selma Group.

Oil was discovered in 1939 within the Late Cretaceous Woodruff Sandstone within the Selma Chalk Formation. Known as Mississippi's first oil field, the Tinsley Oil Field is located adjacent to Tinsley, Mississippi.

== See also ==
- List of dinosaur-bearing rock formations
