= Midway Group =

Geologic group in the southern United States

- Stratigraphic range: Paleogene
- Type: Group
- Underlies: Wilcox Group
- Overlies: Navarro Group, Selma Group

Location
- Region: Mississippi Embayment and East Texas
- Country: United States

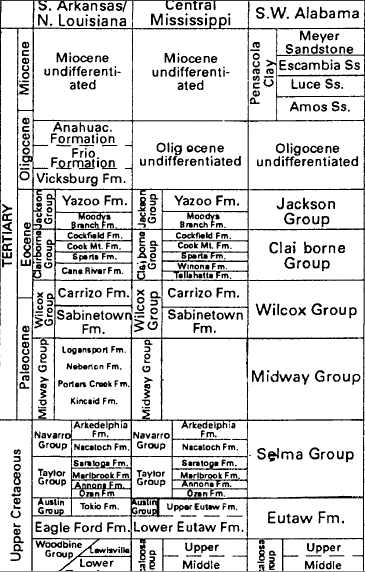
Stratigraphy of the Midway Group as of 1993; the Paleogene corresponds to the Paleocene, Eocene and Oligocene

The Midway Group is a geologic group in the Mississippi Embayment of Tennessee, Arkansas, Mississippi, Louisiana, Texas and Alabama. It preserves fossils dated to the Paleogene period.

== See also ==
- List of fossiliferous stratigraphic units in Arkansas
- List of fossiliferous stratigraphic units in Louisiana
- List of fossiliferous stratigraphic units in Texas
- List of fossiliferous stratigraphic units in Tennessee
- Paleontology in Arkansas
- Paleontology in Louisiana
- Paleontology in Texas
- Paleontology in Tennessee
