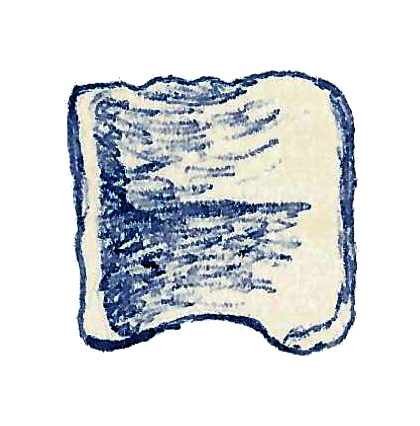
- Illustration of a holotype vertebra

Scientific classification (Nomen oblitum)
- Kingdom: Animalia
- Phylum: Chordata
- Class: Reptilia
- Clade: Dinosauria
- Clade: †Ornithischia
- Clade: †Ornithopoda
- Genus: †Hypsibema
- Species: †H. missouriensis

Binomial name
- †Hypsibema missouriensis (Gilmore, 1945)

Synonyms
- Neosaurus missouriensis Gilmore & Stewart, 1945; Parrosaurus missouriensis Gilmore, 1945

= Hypsibema missouriensis =

Hypsibema missouriensis Temporal range: Late Cretaceous, Campanian

Extinct species of dinosaur

Hypsibema missouriensis (/ˌhɪpsɪˈbiːmə mɪˌzʊəriˈɛnsɪs/; originally Neosaurus missouriensis, first renamed to Parrosaurus missouriensis, also spelled Hypsibema missouriense) is a species of plant-eating dinosaur in the genus Hypsibema, and the state dinosaur of the U.S. state Missouri. One of the few official state dinosaurs, bones of the species were discovered in 1942, at what later became known as the Chronister Dinosaur Site near Glen Allen, Missouri. The remains of Hypsibema missouriensis at the site, which marked the first known discovery of dinosaur remains in Missouri, are the only ones to have ever been found. Although first thought to be a sauropod, later study determined that it was a hadrosaur, or "duck-billed" dinosaur, whose snouts bear likeness to ducks' bills. Some of the species' bones found at the Chronister Dinosaur Site are housed in Washington, D.C.'s Smithsonian Institution.

== Discovery and naming ==
Remains of Hypsibema missouriensis were first discovered in Bollinger County, Missouri by members of the Chronister family while they were digging a cistern, and were subsequently collected by Stewart. In 1942, Stewart, of the Missouri Geological Survey, had been examining clay near Glen Allen when he came upon a boy who led him to the family at work digging. According to Stewart, property owner Lulu Chronister had found several "unusual" bones while digging and had saved them. They had been found about 8 feet (2.4 m) deep in the Chronisters' well, which had an overall depth of 24 feet (7.3 m), "imbedded in a black plastic clay." Stewart reported his discovery to the Smithsonian Institution, which bought the remains—thirteen vertebrae of a dinosaur's tail—from Chronister for US$50, which was later used to purchase a cow. Two other bones, of unknown type, were also recovered from the site, while one additional vertebrae had been given by Lulu Chronister to a friend. At the Smithsonian, the bones were analyzed but the species from which they originated was incorrectly identified.

The site where the bones were found was largely untouched by paleontologists until around the 1970s and 1990s, when excavations restarted. Remains of other dinosaurs, fish, turtles, and plants have also been found, including teeth belonging to a member of the Tyrannosauroidea. Bone fragments of a dromaeosaur have also been unearthed in this area. Other parts of H. missouriensis, including dental remains and part of a jaw, have also been found. The variety of faunal remnants found at the Chronister site suggest that a large body of water once existed close to the area.

=== Geology of the dig site ===
One paleontologist from St. Louis currently working at the dig site said it was "pretty much a miracle" that dinosaur bones were found in Missouri, because the state's soft soil has resulted in the deterioration of most prehistoric remains. However, some of the remains found have been damaged by erosion and other processes. While much of Missouri lies upon rocks from the Paleozoic or Precambrian eras, the Chronister site is situated over Mesozoic rock. Stewart, who found the bones after being assigned to study the origins of clay in the southeastern portion of the Ozarks, was able to conclude that part of the region lies upon deposits from the Upper Cretaceous period, although much of the sediment from that time period has eroded away.

The Chronister family dug the well (which they ultimately abandoned after it was unable to provide enough water) just southwest of their farmhouse, atop a body of limestone. The farmhouse was located near the bottom of a steep valley, sitting atop the remains of a terrace. The layer of clay in which the bones were found was described by Stewart as being 9 feet (2.7 m) thick, situated below 7 feet (2.1 m) of yellow-brown clay and gravel at the surface, and above a dense mass of limestone. Previous interpretations of the site concluded the site to be a minor deposit of clay in a sinkhole; however, aquatic taxa recovered from the deposit, such as the turtle Trionyx, suggest a coastal plain lacustrine environment.

Chronister Site Fauna
Class	Order	Family	Genus	Species
Chondrichthyes	Hybodontoidea	Hybodontidae	Lissodus	sp.
Chondrichthyes	Batoidea	unknown	unknown	unknown
Osteichthyes	Semionotoidea	Lepisosteidae	Lepisosteus	sp.
Osteichthyes	Amioidea	Amiidae	Platacodon	nanus
Reptilia	Chelonia	Dermatemydidae	Naomichelys	speciosa
Reptilia	Chelonia	Trionychidae	Trionyx	sp.
Reptilia	Crocodylia	Crocodylidae	Leidyosuchus	sp.
Reptilia	Saurischia	Ornithomimidae	unknown	unknown
Reptilia	Saurischia	Tyrannosauridae	unknown	unknown
	Saurischia	Dromaeosauridae	unknown	unknown

Though this deposit is late Cretaceous in age, several varieties of paleozoic sediments were found associated with the bone-bearing clays; material from the middle Ordovician Plattin and Kimmswick Limestones, late Ordovician Maquoketa formation, early Silurian Bainbridge Group limestones, as well as early Devonian Bailey Formation limestones have all been recognized by geologists studying the deposit. These sediments are similar both in composition and age to the sediments found in both the Marble Hill and Glen Allen structures and are, most likely, tectonically related. Late Cretaceous leaf impressions have been found in laminated Cretaceous clays in the Marble Hill structure, but no vertebrate material has been recovered.

=== Identification ===
Gilmore, at the Smithsonian, along with Stewart, first described the species as a sauropod in the January 1945 issue of the Journal of Paleontology, a classification made in error and without positive evidence. Gilmore only deemed the species a sauropod by process of elimination; when he was left with the possibilities of Hadrosauridae and Sauropoda, he dismissed the former, saying, "The more elongate centra of the Chronister specimen, with the possible exception of Hypsibema crassicauda Cope, and the presence of chevron facets only on the posterior end appear sufficient to show that these vertebral centra do not pertain to a member of the Hadrosauridae."

The species, first called Neosaurus missouriensis, was renamed to Parrosaurus missouriensis later that year by Gilmore and Stewart because the name "Neosaurus" was preoccupied. However, Gilmore died soon after, and the bones were left untouched for several decades.

Parrosaurus missouriensis was once again moved in 1979, to the genus Hypsibema, this time by Donald Baird and John R. Horner. In the late 1970s, Bruce L. Stinchcomb, a geologist, traveled to the Chronister site after reading about Gilmore's report in the 1950s. He was able to purchase the property from a member of the Chronister family, and in the 1980s, test excavations were performed by Stinchcomb, David Parris, and Barbara Grandstaff, leading them to conclude that H. missouriensis was actually a hadrosaur rather than a sauropod. Thomas Holtz has suggested reverting to Parrosaurus for this species. In 2018, some paleontologists decided that Parrosaurus was indeed a valid genus of dinosaur.

=== New remains ===
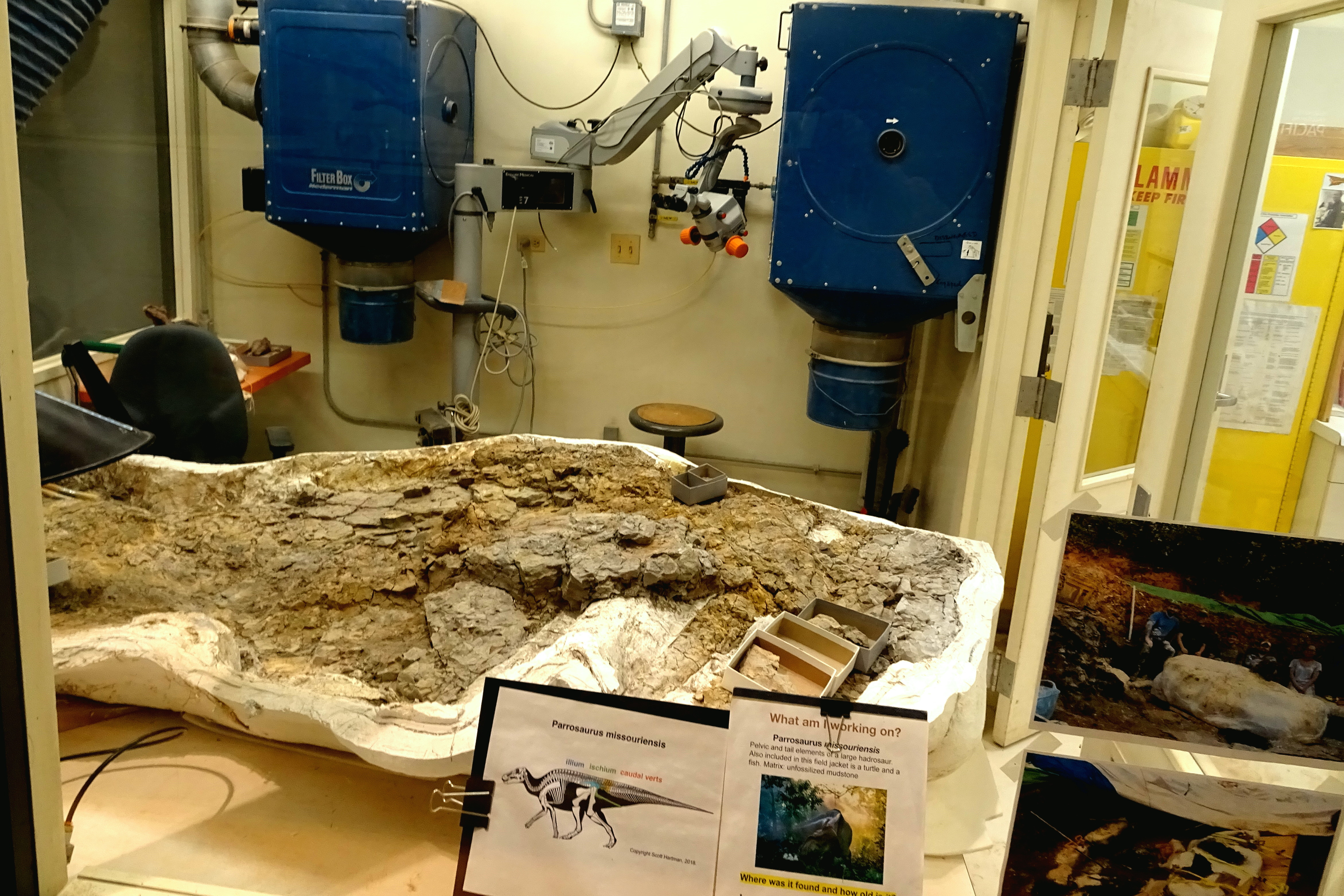
Specimen during preparation at the Field Museum of Natural History

In 2011, remains of a juvenile were found by palaeontologist Guy Darrough at an undisclosed location. in 2016 and 2017, four new specimens of Hypsibema missouriensis were found. They were excavated by both him and staff from the Field Museum of Natural History like Peter Makovicky, before the adults went to the Field Museum while the juvenile went to the Sainte Genevieve Museum Learning Center in Ste. Genevieve where Darrough works as curator, where a new exhibit will display it.

== Description ==
Size comparison

The species is estimated to have had around 1,000 small teeth, weighed 3–4 short tons (2.7–3.6 t) (or around as much as an elephant today), stood 10 feet (3.0 m) tall at its back, and stretched about 30–35 feet (9.1–10.7 m) from head to tail. H. missouriensis lived in what is now southeast Missouri during the Campanian age of the Late Cretaceous period. It was not a carnivorous species; however, its teeth were more serrated than other hadrosaurs, an indicator that the vegetation it consumed was very coarse or tough.

Paleontologist Charles Whitney Gilmore and geologist Dan R. Stewart described the caudal vertebrae retrieved from Missouri in a 1945 Journal of Paleontology report, writing, "Caudal vertebrae amphicoelus; centra longer than wide; ends having concave central areas decorated with radiating ridges and depressions surrounded by a flattened peripheral border; chevron facets only on posterior ends." Of the thirteen adult tail bones, twelve appeared to be consecutive, and the smallest centrum was 69 millimetres (2.7 in) long.

== Cultural significance ==
=== State dinosaur designation ===
On January 21, 2004, a bill was introduced in the Missouri House of Representatives by State Representatives Rod Jetton and Jason Crowell. Jetton had originally proposed the hadrosaur as the state dinosaur, but was not specific enough, so the House Conservation and Natural Resources Committee settled on Hypsibema missouriensis. The bill was then sent to the 92nd Missouri General Assembly. It passed the Missouri House of Representatives on March 8, 2004, with a vote of 147–4, the Missouri Senate on May 14, 2004, with a vote of 34–0, and was approved by then-governor Bob Holden on July 9, 2004. The bill, House Bill 1209, went into effect August 28, 2004. Missouri became the sixth U.S. state to have designated an official state dinosaur, following Colorado, Maryland, New Jersey, Texas, and Wyoming, as well as the District of Columbia.

=== Local impact ===
A model of the species once on display at the Bollinger County Museum of Natural History

In 2005, representatives from Bollinger County businesses and local government officials met in an effort to generate more revenue, and came up with a dinosaur-centered tourism campaign. Some businesses contributed to the creation of a billboard along Interstate 55 that would advertise, "Bollinger County, Home of the Missouri Dinosaur." The Bollinger County Museum of Natural History, which displays some of the bones found, has said their exhibit on the species has attracted tourists from other parts of the United States, and the museum says the designation of H. missouriensis as the state dinosaur resulted in a tripling of visitors. The Bollinger County Museum of Natural History closed permanently on December 31, 2021. Models of Hypsibema are at Ste Genevieve Museum Learning Center.

In March 2008, construction on a full-size model of a H. missouriensis was completed and placed on display at the museum. Jetton, then Speaker of the Missouri House of Representatives, sponsored a dinner event for state legislators to celebrate the completion of the exhibit on March 7, 2008. The two-year project was directed by Darrough, who was also in charge of excavations at the Chronister excavation site, and is the only permanent museum exhibit to feature the species. At the opening of the exhibit, Jetton mentioned that he hoped the dig site would become part of a state park one day. Currently, excavation is being conducted by the Missouri Ozark Dinosaur Project. The site has been covered to prevent water from flowing over dig material. The Chronister dig site near Glen Allen, currently under private ownership by Stinchcomb, is the only location in Missouri where dinosaur bones have been found.

== See also ==
- Timeline of hadrosaur research
