= List of caves of Maryland =

This is a List of caves of Maryland. Maryland has numerous caves, with the greatest concentration in its western counties: Washington, Allegany, and Garrett.

== Research on the topic ==
There are a number of sources about the topic area, including a reference book titled Caves of Maryland which was first released by the Maryland Geological Survey (MGS) in 1950. But information about Maryland caves was first gathered into a series of reports by Martin Muma in the mid-1940s, working under the MGS. After the release of these articles in 1946, a more comprehensive study was begun by William Davies, whose years of fieldwork led to the compilation of the premiere edition of Caves of Maryland in 1950. Following the release of the first edition of Caves of Maryland in 1950, several other attempts by various parties and interested groups have been made at expanding available information concerning Maryland's subterrain. In the late 1960s the MGS sponsored another statewide survey, undertaken by Richard Franz and Dennis Slifer, and a second, expanded edition of Caves of Maryland was released in 1971. It was not until the inception of this second project that areas west of Washington County were even thoroughly canvassed; even after the conclusion of the Franz/Slifer survey, it was speculated that even more, undiscovered caves could still remain in more remote portions of the western counties, prompting the need for an additional version, but since that time there have been no additional state sponsored reports or surveys released to the public.

In Maryland, a cave is defined as any subterranean cavity large enough for a human to enter. This definition has led the authors to include several shelter caves, fissures, and mines that in states with larger, more complex cave systems, might otherwise go unlisted.

== Maryland geology and caves ==
Most of Maryland's caves occur in its three westernmost counties (Washington, Allegany, and Garrett). While Maryland may be smaller than many of its neighboring states containing larger numbers of caves, its geology likewise allows for the formation of caverns, most of which are hollowed out by chemical processes—these caves are known as solutional caves. Non-solutional caves are carved out by weathering and are typically of smaller size and of little interest to spelunkers. Underlying layers of carbonate rocks form much of Maryland's bedrock. Precipitation and groundwater react with such rocks as dolomite, limestone, and marble, dissolving the rock and forming small fissures and chambers allowing more water to enter and the dissolve the carbonic rock. Being able to identify the different types of rock that caves are likely to form in can provide a great deal of background into a cave's likely history, and thus these rock formations will be further discussed moving east to west across the state.

Coastal Plain – this is the area of Maryland extending from just west of the Chesapeake Bay to the Atlantic Ocean: Precambrian rocks are mostly overlain by gravel, silts, marls, and sands, and consequently no solutional caves are known to exist in this region of Maryland.

Piedmont Plateau – an area of gently rolling hills and flatlands, the Piedmont is home to only a few of Maryland's caves, as most of its members are unsuitable for their development or are largely hidden from view beneath surface settlement. Exceptions in the uplands area include the Wakefield and Cockeystown marbles, which are known to include but a few caves. In the lowlands portion of the Piedmont (known as the Frederick Valley) caves are found in the Frederick Formation and Grove Limestone (upper Cambrian and lower Ordovician, respectively). Several other limestone members exist (Tomstown and New Oxford), no caves have been located within these members.

Blue Ridge & the Great Valley – the Blue Ridge rises up from the Piedmont just west of Frederick in the first of its two mountains, Braddock/Catoctin. Here older limestone and dolomites from the Cambrian/Ordovician make an appearance, offering up a few caves in the Frederick/Middletown Valley vicinity. On top of these, older, harder thrust sheets of metamorphic rocks from the Paleozoic give these mountains their well-defined crests and ridges. Wolf Rock, home to Maryland's best-known non-solutional cave, is an example of quartzite that has endured while Catoctin Mountain has weathered around it.

South Mountain, which serves as a natural border between Frederick and Washington counties, is the western edge of Maryland's Blue Ridge, giving way to an area of relatively little relief, known as the Great Valley (or locally as Hagerstown/Cumberland). Here the harder metamorphosed rocks of the Blue Ridge are replaced by carbonates, sandstones, and shale that grow progressively younger moving west, entering the early Ordovician period. The highest concentration of Maryland caves lies within the Hagerstown Valley, where well-established waterways have cut into the underlying carbonate rocks. Recent fieldwork, combined with the observations of Franz and Slifer, indicate that the most cavernous units exposed in the Great Valley are, from oldest to youngest, the Tomstown Dolomite, the Cavetown member of the Waynesboro Formation, the lower beds of the Elbrook Formation, the Rockdale Run Formation, and, especially cavernous, the Chambersburg Formation. The probability of cave development, however, is also very strongly influenced by the presence of structural features such as anticlinal axes, synclinal troughs, and faults. In contrast to the larger caves of neighboring West Virginia, caves in the Great Valley are generally quite shallow with little internal relief. In-cave relief rarely exceeds 50 feet (15 m) in Washington County. High deformation and faulting allows surface waters to penetrate rock vertically and reach the shallow underlying water table quickly without much lateral travel. This serves to limit cavern development considerably, and of the many caves in Washington County, only Crystal Grottoes is known to exceed 1,000 feet (300 m) in length, and it attains such length from having a maze pattern of passages, rather than a long continuous stream conduit.

Ridge & Valley Region – is the name of the physiological province extending west of the Great Valley to the western portion of Allegany County. This region is traditionally defined as starting at Fairview Mountain and is characterized by repeating southwest- to northeast-trending ridges and valleys. A thrust fault just east of Fairview indicates where younger rocks from the Ordovician through Devonian were overthrust by their Cambrian neighbors to the east. The region is built upon shale and sandstone from the upper Ordovician and lower Silurian periods, with little or no cave-bearing limestone seen until the lower Helderberg Group, Wills Creek Formation and Tonoloway Formation. Thicker formations of the upper Devonian consist of the Keyser Formation and New Creek Limestone, in which some of the largest caves in the state can be found.

Allegany Plateau – the Allegany is a rolling upland punctuated by deep, rounded valleys and ridges of distinct, broad anticlines. Shale and sandstone of the Ordovician and lower Silurian are replaced by limestone formations which continue into the lower Devonian. These younger rocks have settled to a depth equal to that of the much older rocks of the Ordovician. This change in depth occurs along a fault just east of Dans Mountain. Moving west from outcrops of early Devonian limestone, the Helderbergian limestones pinch out and the formation consists of clastic rocks that bear no caves. Synclines within this region have preserved remains from the younger Carboniferous Period—the period containing Maryland's only natural source of carbon fuels—within the Mississippian system lies the Greenbrier Formation, the next oldest limestone member known to contain caves. The Greenbrier is relatively thin but contains eight known large caves, including the largest cave in Maryland, Tanglefoot Cave. The youngest rocks to contain caves are in Garrett County: they are Pennsylvanian in age. All younger sediments have been removed from the landscape with the exception of the Dunkard Group, a small knob in Allegany County that is Permian in age.

== List of caves ==
All caves given in the 1950 publication of Caves of Maryland are listed below by county.

=== Allegany County ===
- Atheys - Located in the Tonoloway Formation. The cave is described as being located one mile east of the town of Rush on the property of a I. W. Athey, 100 feet inside the woods just east of the Athey barn. The inconspicuous entrance is a sloping pit about 6 feet deep. The cave contains four rooms and several pools of water.
- Cumberland Bone Cave - Located near the town of Corriganville, this cave was discovered in 1912 during the construction of the Western Maryland Railway, revealing rich fossil fauna from the Pleistocene and subsequently sent to the U.S. National Museum by James W. Gidley. The cave was scarcely more than a small room filled with clay and breccia. It developed in the Keyser limestone.
- Cumberland Quarry - Located in the Wills Creek Formation on the south side of Wills Creek, opposite Valley Street in Cumberland. There are two 20-foot-long crawlways located in a tightly folded section of the Wills Creek Formation, on the east face of the quarry.
- Devils Den - Located south of Flintstone on the farm once owned by Harry Jackson. The entrance is in a lightly forested area 1,000 feet northeast of the Jackson house. To reach the cave, you follow the strike of the rocks northeast from a spring opposite the house. The cave was a favorite play area for children in years past. The cave is tied closely to a branch of Flintstone Creek and reappears as a large spring and tributary to Murley Branch. Devils Den developed in the top part of the Tonoloway limestone.
- Devil's Hole - Located in the Keyser Member of the Helderberg limestone, this cave can be found one mile north of Twiggtown. The cave is a vertical shaft reportedly connecting to two small rooms at its base. It is one of the largest and most interesting Allegany County caves.
- Goat - Located at the northwest side of Patterson Street, this cave developed in a narrow bed of folded limestone within the Wills Creek Formation. The cave has a very low ceiling, less than 4 feet (1 m).
- Greises - Developed in the Tonoloway limestone, the cave entrance is over a pile of rocks to a 20 foot wide chamber. Continuing passage is steep and is 200 feet (61 m) long, curving to a 40 foot long crawlway with three rooms. The cave can have water flowing along some of the upper passages during the wet season and can form a waterfall in the Well Room.
- Horse - Also known as Dead Horse Cave, it is located 1,000 yards (910 m) south of Twiggs Cave, near the Twiggtown-Spring Gap road. Developed in the Favosites zone of the Keyser limestone at 1,440 feet (440 m) elevation. The cave is relatively shallow, with 8 to 10 feet of overburden at the entrance room.
- Murley Branch Spring - Located two miles northeast of Twiggs Cave in Tonoloway limestone. The entrance is a low, water-filled opening in a north-facing cliff. It developed in a massive limestone near the base of the formation, where the rocks are horizontal at the crest of a subordinate anticline. The cave trends to the east for 20 feet but is blocked where a spring emerges from a siphon. In 1925, it was reported that several men penetrated the siphon during an exceptionally dry season. They found a passage extending 300 feet (91 m) to the south with at least three deep pits.
- Rocky Gap - Located in Tuscarora Sandstone about 350 feet (110 m) above the Rock Gap Run. This fissure cave extends 120 feet (37 m) to the southeast. The fissure averages five feet wide and five to ten feet high.
- Twiggs - The cave was opened in 1898 by the Twigg grandfather. The Twigg home lies approximately 1,500 feet (460 m) north of the cave on the east slope of a limestone ridge of the Helderberg Formation. Developed in the western side of an anticline, the cave formed as two parallel fissure openings along a master joint. The cave has a high clay content that may accumulate from the underground stream it's connected to. A series of six pits lead to a lower tunnel; the largest pit, the "King's Chair" grants access to the lower tunnel. In 1946, a small tunnel was excavated through clay and gravel that lead to a 40 foot deep pit.

=== Baltimore County ===
- Beaver Run Shelter - A small shelter cave that extends for about 20 feet (6.1 m) ending in a 10-foot-diameter room. The entrance is 2 by 3 feet (0.61 by 0.91 m).

=== Carroll County ===
- Westminster - The entrance, covered with a wooden door, was described as being in an old quarry, facing east. The cave consisted of a single room, though reportedly extending to the west through rockfall. A concrete floor was in the entrance room and was previously used as a milk cooler. It is developed in the Wakefield marble.

=== Frederick County ===
- Buckeystown - Between Buckeystown and Adamstown, a 25-foot (7.6 m) vertical shaft at the base of a small quarry has a single room measuring 20 feet long by 18 feet wide.
- Centerville - A cave was reported to exist in the Wakefield marble in an old quarry one-half mile east of Centerville, along Coppermine Road. The cave was described as having four small rooms.
- Le Gore Quarry-Powells - Powells Cave is located on the west side of Israel Creek. It had a crawlway extending 100 feet (30 m) to the north but is now blocked with stone dumped at the entrance. 100 yards northwest of Powells Cave is a series of openings in the north face of the Le Gore quarry, reportedly circling back and connecting with Powells Cave. Powells Cave and the Le Gore openings are in Grove limestone.
- Linganore Shelter - There are reports of several small shelter caves containing Indian pictographs near Linganore. Davies was unable to locate the shelters.
- McKinstrys Mill - Located 2 and a half miles south of Union Bridge and on the west side of Sams Creek. McKinstrys Mill is less than 100 feet long and can be found west of the mill of the same name.
- Monocacy River - Located 20 feet (6.1 m) above the east bank of the Monocacy river east of Hansonville. The entrance is 4 feet wide and 2 feet high at the base of a small cliff just above the power line. The cave is developed in thinly-bedded Frederick limestone and extends for over 25 feet (7.6 m) towards the southeast.

=== Garrett County ===
- Crabtree - This was the largest cave in Maryland but has now been surpassed by Tanglefoot Cave in Allegany County. It's located 200 yards west of the Savage River Dam at Bond Station on the Baltimore and Ohio railroad. It formed in the Greenbrier limestone and has at least 4,200 feet (1,300 m) of mapped passage. The cave can be navigated in a circuit, which can take an average of seven hours. This cave is gated and needs permission to enter. This cave, along with John Friends Cave, is currently protected by The Nature Conservancy.
- John Friends - Located east of Sang Run, the entrance is in a "clump of woods" 800 feet (240 m) north of the Ginseng Run Road at an elevation of 2,180 feet (660 m). This cave has been known since 1751 as noted by historical graffiti left by W. J. Bowman. A stream enters the cave in several areas of its passages. These cave is in the Greenbrier limestone.
- Muddy Creek Falls Shelter - Two small shelter caves lie at the base of Muddy Creek Falls in Swallow Falls State Forest. The largest shelter is 25 feet long, 15 feet wide and 4 feet high. The second shelter is slightly smaller. These caves belong to the upper part of the Pottsville Formation.
- Sand Cave - Located southwest of Kelso Gap 400 yards west of the country road paralleling Backbone Mountain and at an elevation of 2750 feet. This cave is in the Pottsville Formation and also the largest shelter type cave in Maryland. In its past, the cave was used as a habitat by Native Americans as evident from arrowheads, charcoal, flint chips, and other items found within. The cave had "Elishas Cave" carved above the entrance. The shelter is a broad, low opening about 100 feet wide and nearly hidden by ferns and moss.
- Woods Place - This cave was reported 4 miles (6 km) north of Oakland and east of the road leading to Swallow Falls, but was not located in 1950. The cave was described having an entrance leading down step-like terraces for 50 feet to a passage of unknown length.

=== Howard County ===
- Camels Den - Located 20 feet (6.1 m) above the Patapsco River, Camels Den is a shallow rock shelter measuring 15 by 6 feet (4.6 by 1.8 m) wide by 8 feet (2.4 m) high, developed in the Cockeysville marble. Muma reported two archaeological diggings that took place within the cave and removed a large number of artifacts.

=== Washington County ===
- Antietam - Located 500 yards east of a ravine that is east of the town of Antietam in the Tomstown dolomite formation. It was little more than a 100-foot-long crawlway.
- Busheys Cavern - This cave once exited near a quarry north of Cavetown but was partially destroyed by quarrying, and the remainder collapsed. It was estimated at 500 feet long and within the Tomstown formation (black dolomite). It was originally a source of saltpeter. In 1823 the cave was open to the public and partially developed as a show cave by James Camper. Admission was 12 and a half cents. Later in 1925 the nearby quarry excavated into the cave, collapsing the entrance and inner portions due to blasting.
- Crystal Grottoes - This is Maryland's only show cave, located one mile southwest of Boonsboro. It developed in the Tomstown dolomite. It was discovered in 1920 as a result of quarry operations for road material.

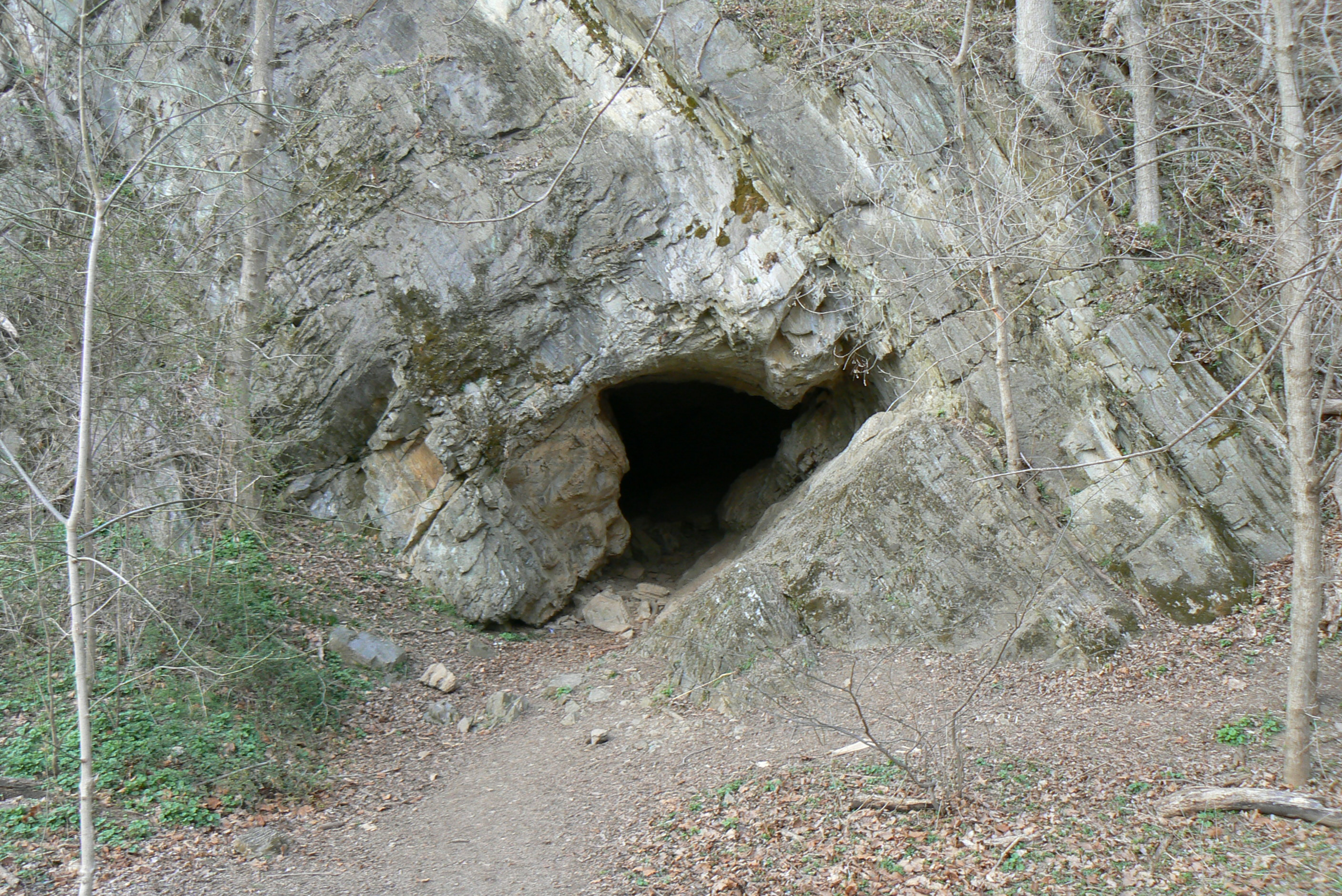
Dam #4 Cave

- Dam No. 4 Cave - Located on the north side of the C&O Canal one mile east of Dam Number 4, level with the canal and at the base of a cliff. It is in the Conococheague limestone. The entrance is 15 feet wide and 20 feet high and with continuing passage of the same size. It extends 100 feet to the north with an offset passage continuing 40 feet beyond. A side passage heads east from there, sloping upward for 30 feet to a small room with a chimney. Along the west side of the chimney, a 40 foot long fissure passage continues to yet another chimney.
- Dargan Quarry - The Dargan quarry is located one-half mile southwest of Dargan along the C&O Canal. In the northeast corner of the quarry, there is a remnant of a former cave that extends 20 feet before being blocked by fallen rock. It is in Tomstown dolomite.
- Dellingers - This cave is located in a cliff along the C&O Canal, west of the Dellingers School site. It formed in the Stones River limestone formation. It is entered through a small hole opening to a corridor that slopes steeply to the south where it connects with a large room. A low passage heads northeast for 50 feet. The main passage continues from the room for about 70 feet. The cave continues with elaborate sub-levels and continuing fissure passage.

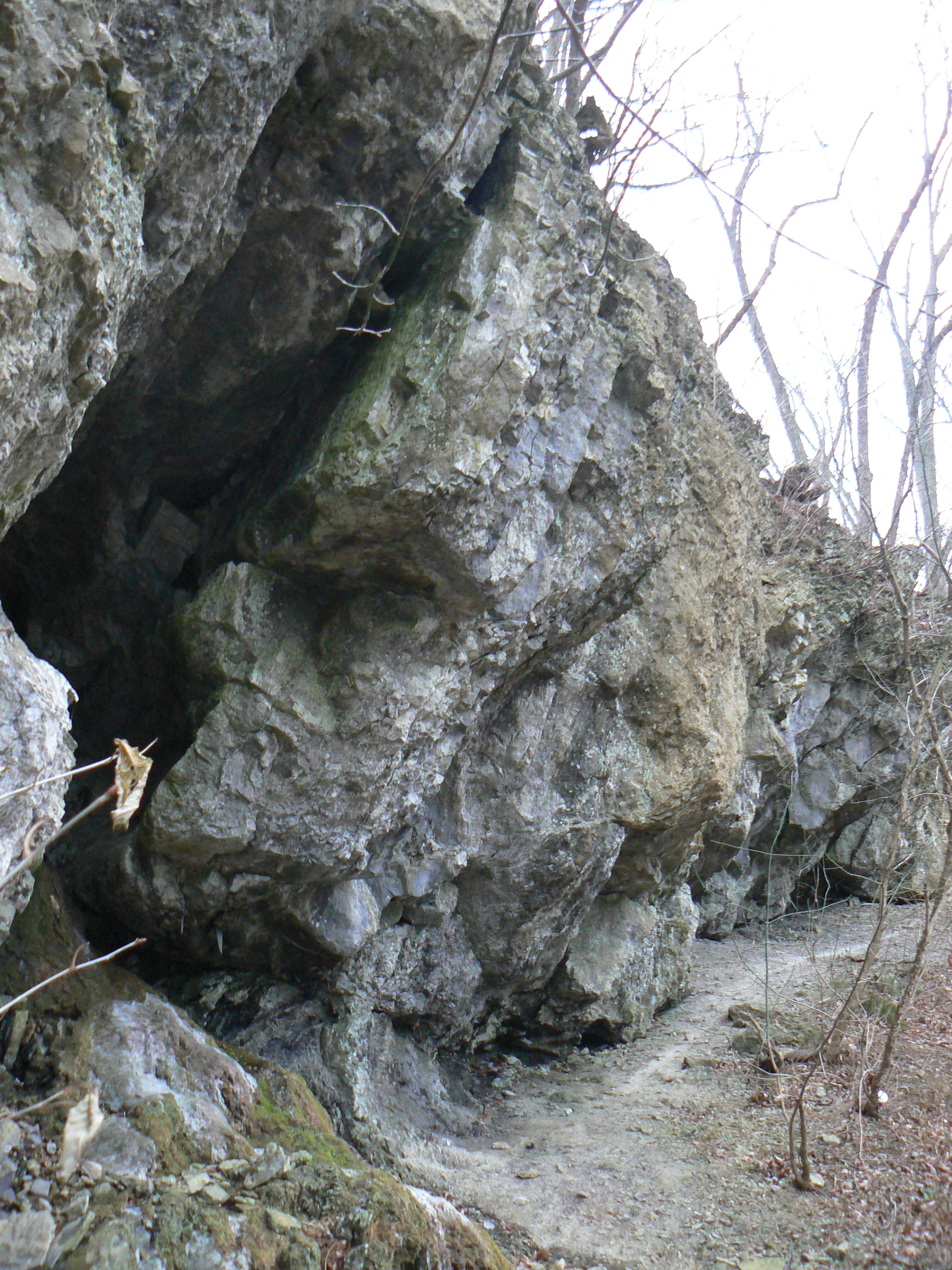
Thrust sheet of Conococheague limestone near Fairview

- Fairview Cave - Located on the west bank of Conococheague Creek and 500 yards south of MD Route 494 near Fairview. The entrance is in a low cliff 40 feet above the creek. The total length of the cave is described as less than 100 feet mostly through crawlway made up of damp clay. The cave developed in the Chambersburg limestone.
- Houpt - This cave is on the west side of Beaver Creek and nearly a mile north of the Beaver Creek settlement. It developed in the Elbrook limestone. The entrance is in a low ledge in front of a house, leading to 80 feet of passage. A stream flows out of the entrance.

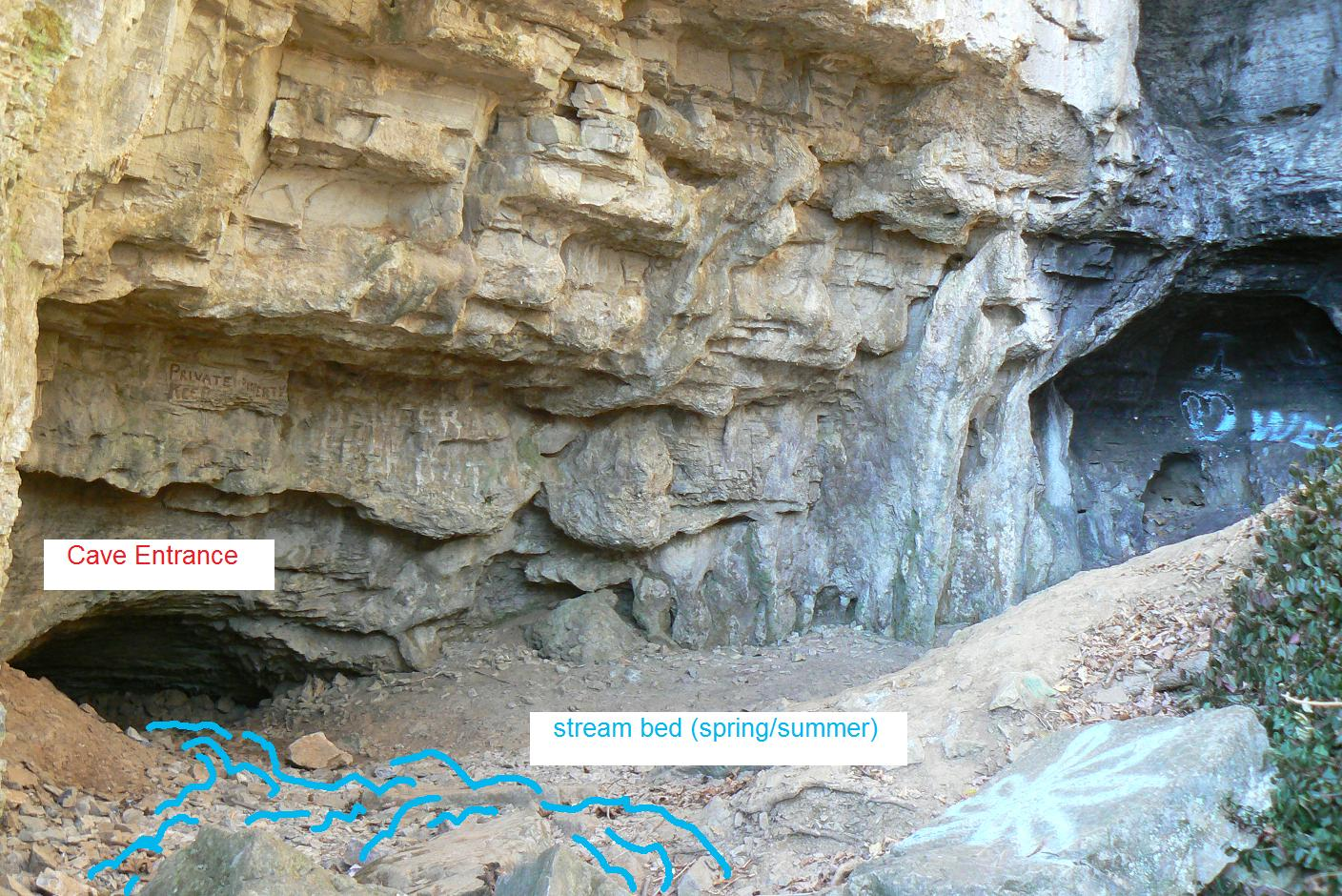
Howell Cave

- Howell - Located west of the Charles mill (Cedar Grove mill) along the C&O Canal in a limestone cliff. It consists of a 12 foot long crawlway that connects to a 15 by 18 foot wide room that connects to another room partitioned by a large rock. It was reported to connect to a sinkhole 700 yards to the north. The cave formed in Stones River limestone.
- Mt. Aetna - In August 1931 a cave was discovered along the Boonesboro-Cavetown road 6 miles north of Boonesboro. It was on the east side of the road at the intersection of rough private road leading southeast. A small flight of concrete stairs leading from a small wooden entrance building were constructed, and in the spring of 1932 the cave was opened commercially but failed within six months due to lack of revenue. The cave developed in the Tomstown formation in dense dolomite. The main passage is over 350 feet long decorated in stalactites and columns. An upper passage is located 37 feet from the entrance and consists of three rooms connected by low narrow passages.
- Pine Hill - This cave is located in a sloping meadow 300 yards (270 m) east of Antietam Creek, east of Breatheds Station. It is a vertical shaft about 50 feet deep. At the base of the shaft a stream passage continues for over 100 feet. The cave developed in the Elbrook limestone.
- Pinesburg - Located near the top of a cliff along the C&O Canal about three fourths of a mile west of Pinesburg Station. The entrance is 3 feet (0.91 m) wide and 6 feet (1.8 m) high, extending north-northeast for about 45 feet (14 m). The cave developed in Stones River limestone.
- Revells - The entrance to this cave is in a low cliff on the south side of Licking Creek about 1,300 feet northeast of Pecktonville. The entrance is 25 feet above the creek, leading to a maze of small interlacing passages averaging 2 feet wide and 4 feet high. The main passage is along the crest of an anticline, with the subordinate passages lying slightly lower on the flanks. It is reported the cave continues through the hill 1,000 feet to the south and connects to another entrance in a small quarry. Revells Cave developed in thinly-bedded black limestone of the Tonoloway Formation.
- Rohrersville Caves - These two caves are located on the east side of Little Antietam Creek about 500 yards north of Rohrersville-Trego road. One cave is in an old quarry and the second in a shallow sink 100 yards to the north. The two caves developed in Tomstown dolomite.
- Round Top #1 - This cave entrance is located 15 feet north of the road leading to the cottage at the summit of Round Top. The entrance is within 20 feet of the summit and is steeply sloped, with 10- to 15-foot widths and heights, extending 30 feet to the south. At the end of the passage there is a 30-foot drop thorough a shaft that leads to a narrow room extending 25 feet before pinching out. It developed in the thick-bedded, knobby-black limestone of the Keyser Formation.
- Round Top #2 - Located 500 feet east of the summit of Round Top in an escarpment 250 feet above the Western Maryland Railway. It is a straight passage extending over 400 feet to the north. This cave developed in the Tonoloway limestone.
- Round Top #3 - This is a large shelter cave located on the north side of the C&O Canal, 300 yards east of the old Cement Mill at Round Top. It is 50 feet wide, 20 feet high, and 40 feet long. It is located in the anticline of the Bloomsburg sandstone.
- Round Top #4 - Round Top caves nos. 4 through 7 were reported by Duane Featherstonhaugh at Round Top. Cave no. 4 is 35 feet above the Western Maryland Railway about 400 feet west of the old cement mill site. It was a crawlway extending 100 feet to the north and developed in Tonoloway limestone.
- Round Top #5 - This cave is located 15 feet above the Western Maryland Railway and 1,100 feet west of the old cement mill. The entrance is a steep crawlway that slopes steeply to the north for 75 feet into a room 100 feet long, 20 feet wide, and 50 feet high. It developed in Tonoloway limestone.
- Round Top #6 - Located a half mile southwest of the old cement mill. The cave has a small opening 20 feet above the Western Maryland Railway. The entrance is steeply sloped, heading northwest and opening into a 400 foot long room that is 100 feet wide. The cave developed in the Tonoloway limestone
- Round Top #7 - On the south end of Round Top and three quarters of a mile southwest of the old cement mill, an entrance is located 20 feet above the Western Maryland Railway. It is a low passage about 30 feet long that opens into a 150 foot long room. The cave developed in the Tonoloway limestone.
- Schetrompf - This cave is located on the north side of a ravine about 200 yards east of Conococheague Creek and 2 miles north of Wilson. The entrance is 40 feet above a spring feeding several watercress ponds. The entrance is in a 2 foot wide by 8 foot tall fissure that extends 25 feet to the north. About 15 feet from the entrance, there is an offset passage extending west to a narrow 15 foot deep pit that reportedly connects to a 30-foot-diameter room. This cave is in the Chambersburg limestone.
- Sharpsburg Shelters - Several small shelters are located in the bluffs 100 feet below the C&O Canal, one and a half miles west of Sharpsburg. One shelter is 35 feet wide and 25 feet high, extending 45 feet. Another shelter is a sinuous crawlway about 200 feet long.
- Snively Cave no. 1 - Named after George Snively, the former owner of the cave. It is located in the south wall of an old quarry at the north end. It is a low 10 foot long crawlway that drops 8 feet into a 15-foot-diameter room. The cave continues through more passage with a side passage. The cave formed in Tomstown dolomite and a large portion of the cave was excavated during quarry operations.
- Snively Cave no. 2 - The second Snively cave is located on top of the bluff northeast of Snively Cave no. 1. The entrance is in a steep-sided, but shallow ravine, and is through a fissure. The drop at the entrance is 15 feet and leads to fissure passage measuring 5 to 10 feet wide and continues for about 100 feet before becoming too narrow to traverse. The cave formed in Tomstown dolomite

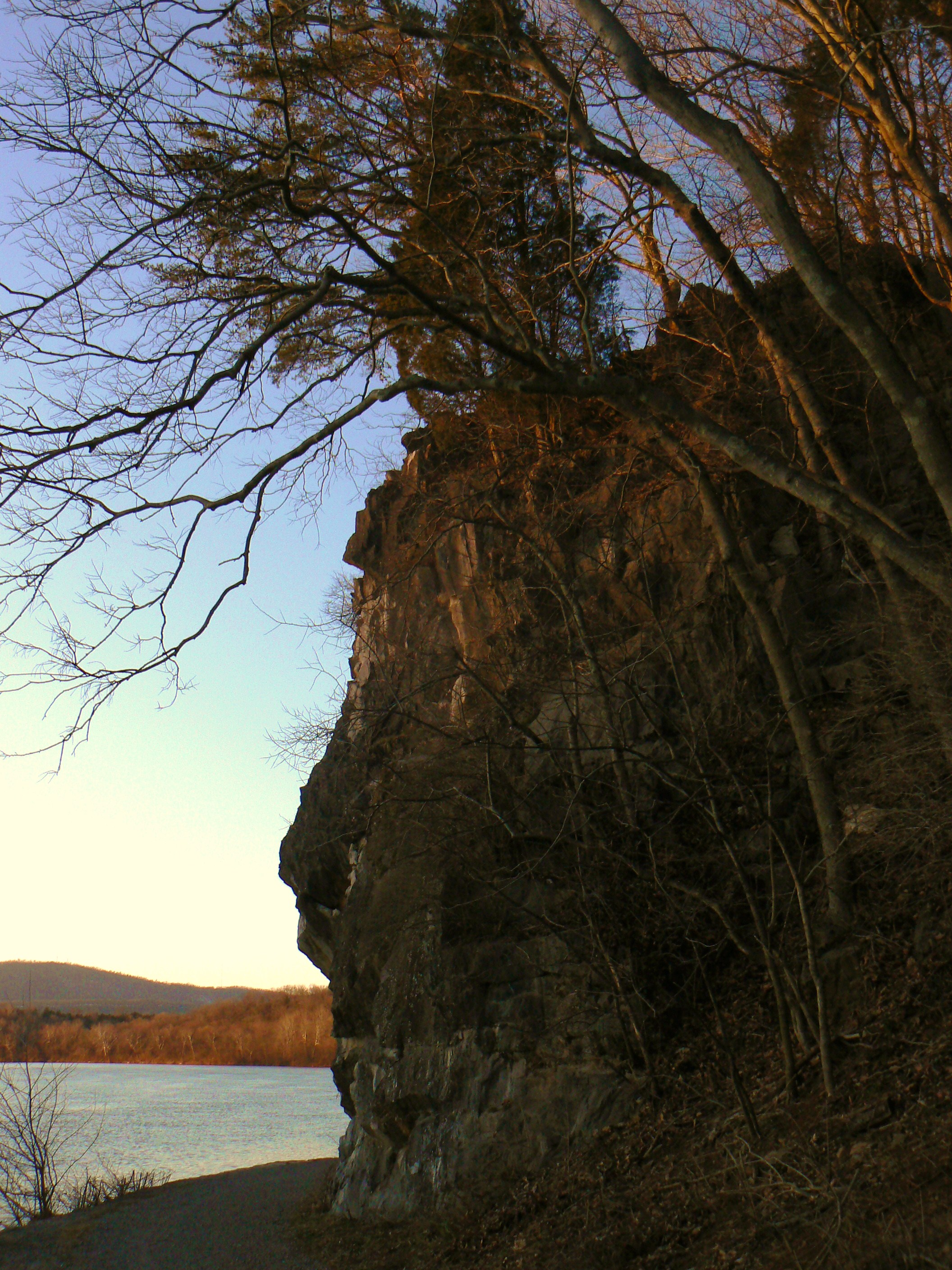
"The Face" is surrounded by small caves near Two Locks

- Two Locks Caves - Three small caves are located in the bluffs along the C&O Canal towpath. They developed in Beekmantown limestone. The northern opening is 30 feet above the river and is floor with river gravel, extending 30 feet to the south. The second cave is a fissure 30 feet above the river and probably connects to the third cave 150 feet to the south.
