= Marienglashöhle =

Show cave in Thuringian Forest

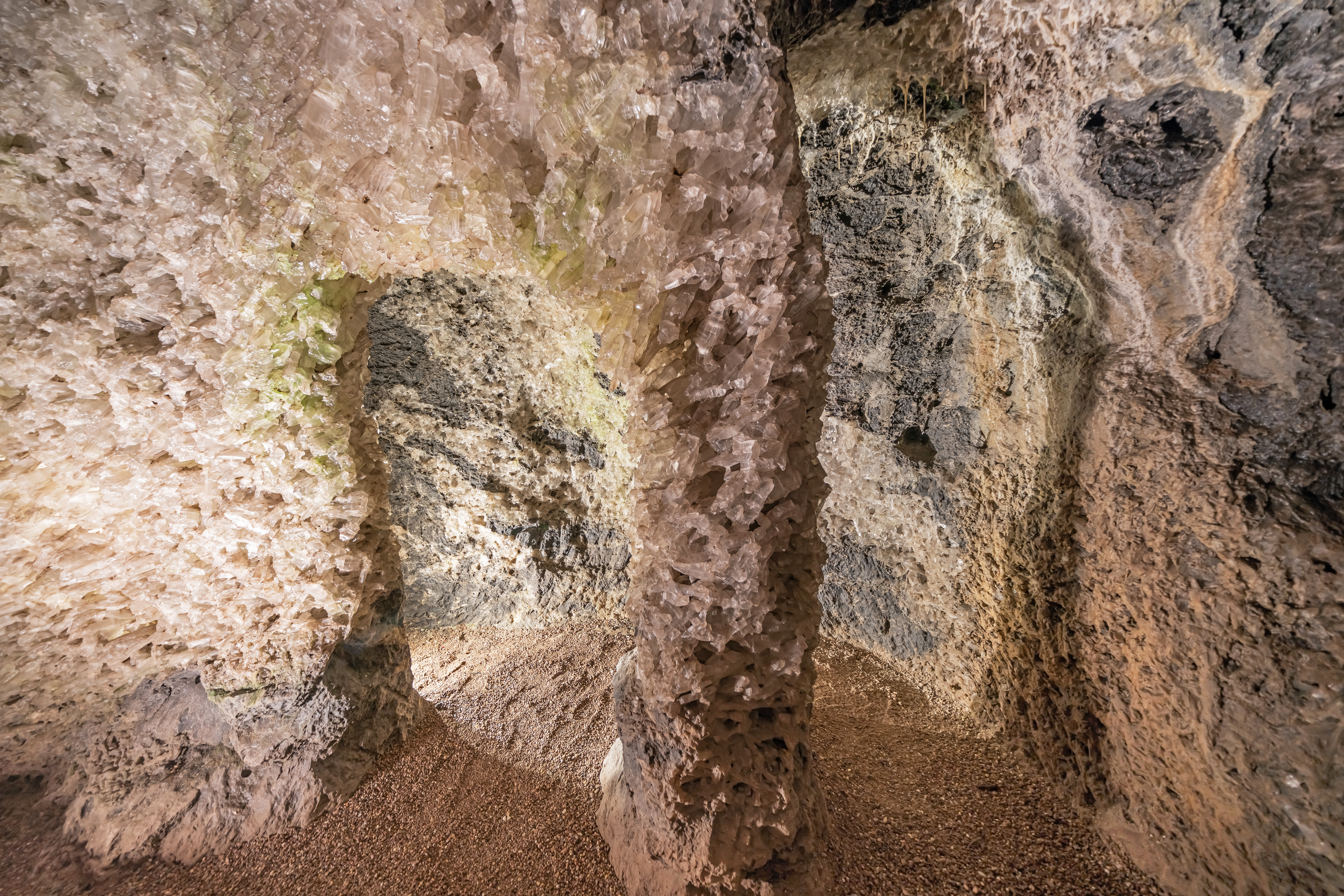
- Marienglashöhle Friedrichroda, Thuringia, Germany

- Location within Thuringia
- Location: Thüringen, Germany
- Coordinates: 50°51′45.3″N 10°32′29.8″E
- Length: 300 m (980 ft) (with access tunnel)
- Elevation: 475 m above sea level NN
- Discovery: 1775/1784
- Geology: Zechstein
- Show cave opened: since 1903
- Lighting: Electric (since 1929)
- Visitors: Annually 71,300 (2007–2011)
- Website: https://friedrichroda.info/kultur-erleben/marienglashoehle

The Marienglashöhle is a show cave situated in the Thuringian Forest. While it features natural caverns, it primarily consists of cavities resulting from historical gypsum and copper mining activities. It is thus managed and presented as both a cave and a show mine. This geological site is designated as a geological natural monument. Positioned between the towns of Friedrichroda and Bad Tabarz, the Marienglashöhle is easily accessible. Visitors can find a large parking lot along Federal Highway 88, and there is also a Thuringian Forest Railway named after the cave nearby. Guided tours are available to explore the cave, attracting approximately 71,000 visitors annually.

In 1775, construction of the entrance adit began with the intention of mining copper. Although no copper shale was found, a gypsum deposit was discovered in 1778. Gypsum mining continued underground until 1903. In 1784, one of Europe's largest and most beautiful gypsum crystal druses was discovered within the cave. With a diameter of approximately ten meters, this druse was almost entirely lined with colorless and transparent gypsum crystals known as Marienglas.

The gypsum from the Marienglashöhle was utilized in churches and monasteries for altar decorations, chandeliers, and paintings until 1848. Following the closure of the mine in 1903, it was transformed into a show cave. However, the cave was temporarily closed on two occasions due to wartime circumstances. Subsequently, after extensive restoration work, the Marienglashöhle became accessible once more on November 30, 1968.

== Geology ==
The cave is situated approximately 15 kilometers southwest of Gotha, near the northeastern border of the Thuringian Forest, where it transitions into the Thuringian Basin and the Waltershausen foothills. Fracture-tectonic processes in connection with the uplift of the Thuringian Forest caused a dragging of the sedimentary rocks in the transition area of Triassic and Zechstein into a sloping to steep position with inclinations of 70 degrees. Consequently, the rocks in this region experienced significant tectonic stress. The Marienglashöhle runs through the steeply northeast dipping layers of the Buntsandstein and Zechstein.

A significant portion of the cave comprises artificial cavities resulting from mining activities. In the entrance gallery, there is first mottled sandstone, followed by dolomite from the upper Zechstein period, and ultimately, gypsum from the lower Zechstein period. These distinct rock sequences are visible through five geological viewing windows, each several meters wide. These windows were intentionally left open during the construction of the entrance gallery, known as the Herzog-Ernst-Stollen. The lower level of the cave has an approximate base area of 80 by 30 meters and a height of about four meters. On the other hand, the upper floor extends over an area of 120 by 40 meters and varies in height between four and six meters.

Only the crystal grotto is of natural origin. This grotto, measuring seven by ten meters and reaching up to ten meters in height, was created through a process of leaching. Over millions of years, it was shaped by the dissolution of minerals in the rock. The cavity is lined with large, colorless, translucent white crystals of gypsum spar, which formed as a result of seepage and groundwater infiltrating an aqueous solution of calcium sulfate. This crystal grotto is unique because, unlike most other cavities in gypsum rock, the gypsum within this cavity crystallized. These crystals, known as Marienglas, are composed of calcium sulfate and belong to the mineralogical category of gypsum, specifically in the selenite crystal form. On display in the crystal grotto are gypsum crystals two to eight centimeters thick and up to 90 centimeters long. This crystal grotto is regarded as one of Europe's largest and most stunning. Natural gypsum caves can also be found in the karst region at the southern edge of the Harz Mountains, such as the Heimkehle cave.

== History ==
=== Mining ===
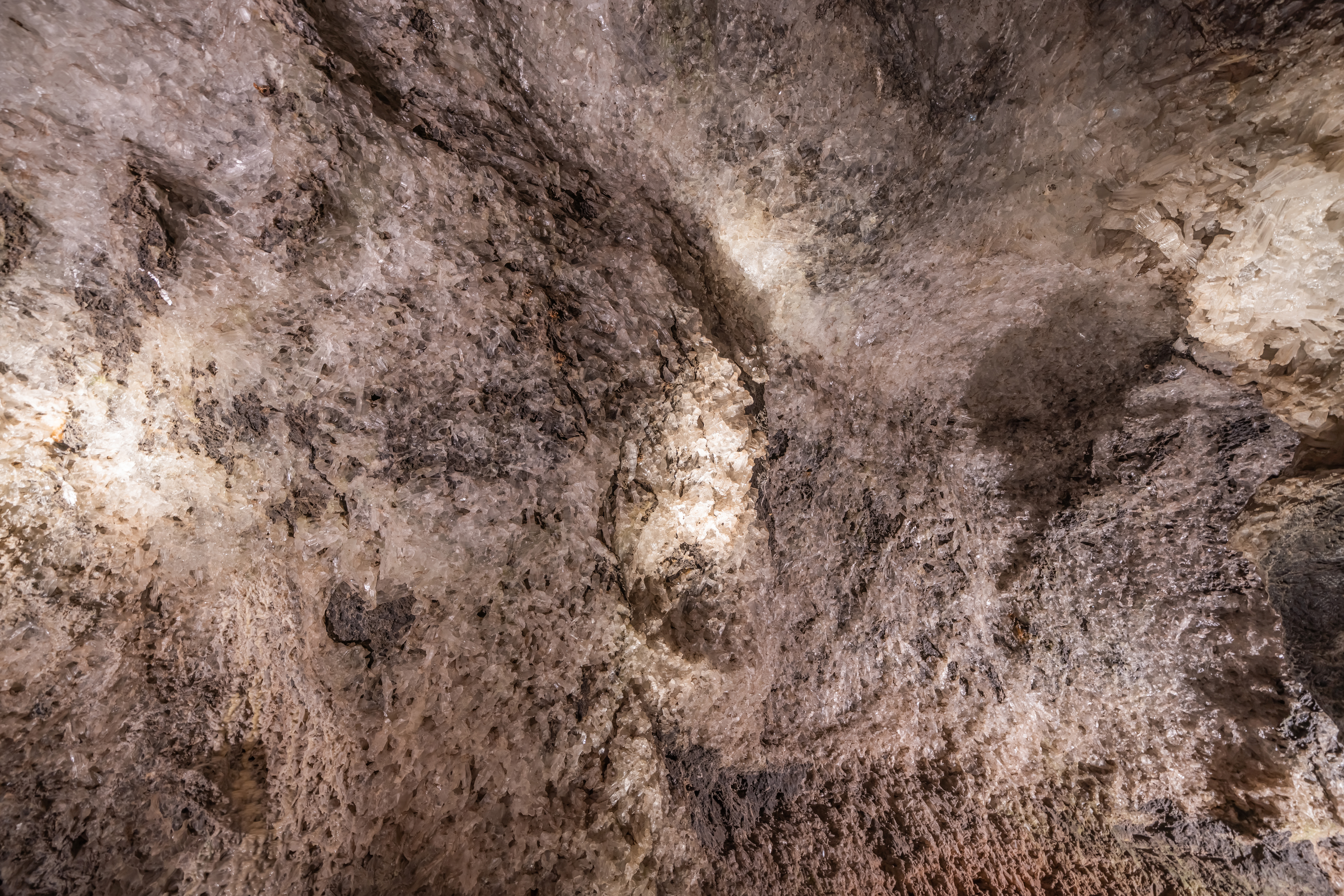
Marienglas in the Crystal Grotto

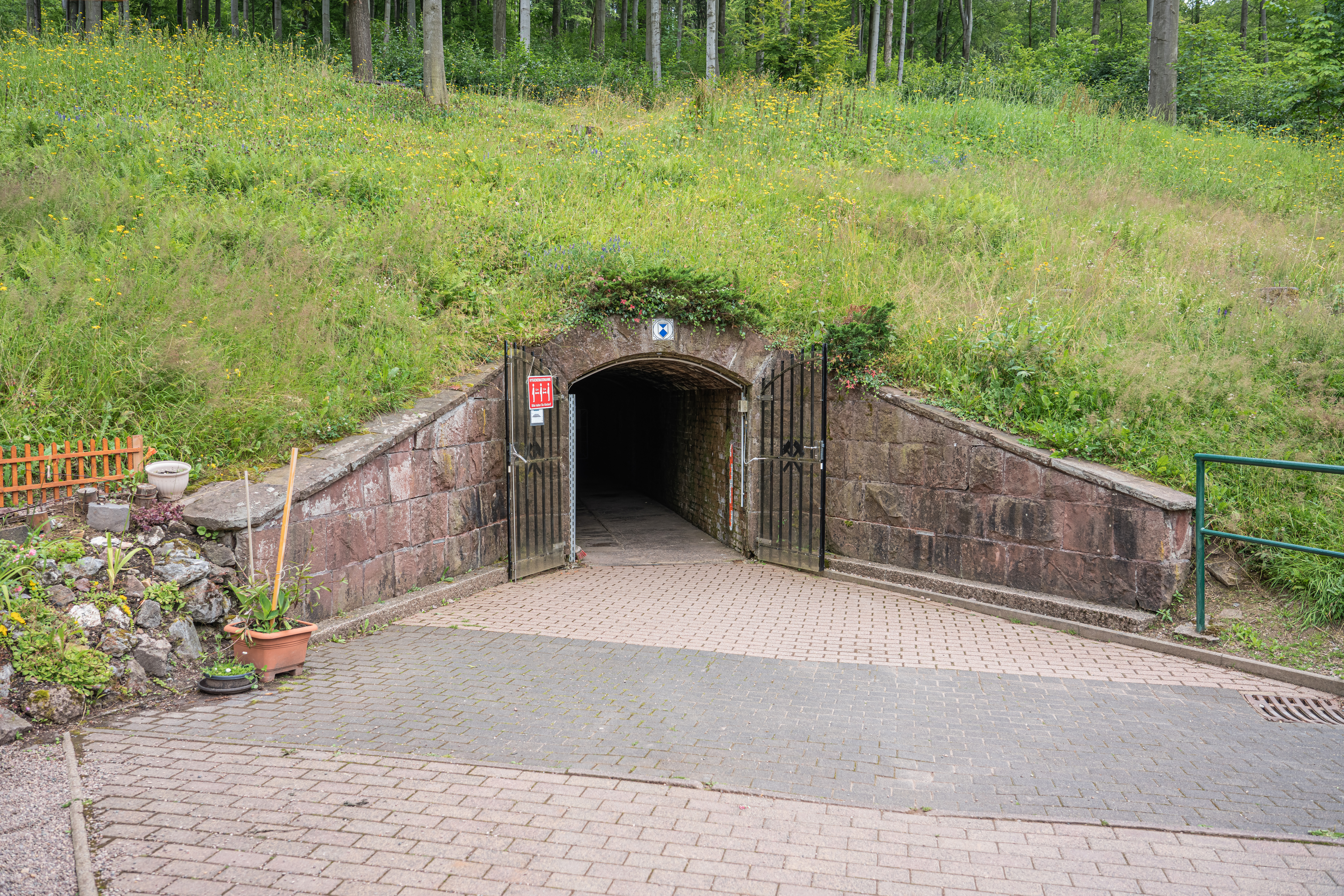
Entrance of the cave

In Friedrichroda, mining activities date back to 1538 when iron ore was first documented to be extracted from the Bau auf Gott mine. However, in 1775 with the commencement of the Herzog-Ernst-Stollen, an exploratory adit located at the base of the 697-meter-high Abtsberg. Initially, the objective was to search for copper shale, but this pursuit proved unsuccessful. In 1778, during the mining operations, a gypsum deposit was unexpectedly encountered. This deposit, which had previously been known from open-pit mining, led to the excavation of a substantial gypsum deposit composed of plastered Werra anhydrite. Mining of this gypsum deposit commenced the same year. It is worth noting that mining in the Herzog-Ernst-Stollen faced challenges, due to inadequate ventilation within the access tunnel. Consequently, gypsum extraction could only be carried out by a maximum of four miners at a time. These miners relied on vegetable oil lamps for lighting, which emitted a brightness level similar to that of a candle flame. Unfortunately, this method led to air pollution within the cave. In the process, the cavities of the Marienglashöhle were created. Initially, mining operations were suspended after approximately one year, when the gallery had reached a length of about 75 meters. This pause may have been prompted by the low yield at that time. In 1778, the government of Saxony-Gotha leased the gallery to Johann Buschmann, organ builder and father of Christian Friedrich Ludwig Buschmann, who came from Friedrichroda. He had a farm building, a half-timbered house, and a kiln built in front of the gallery mouth.The plaster was fired there and sold as stucco plaster. Notably, Johann Wolfgang von Goethe, the privy councilor and minister from Weimar, visited the Herzog-Ernst-Stollen on May 10, 1782. During this visit, he was accompanied by Bergrat Carl Friedrich Baum from Friedrichroda.

=== Discovery of the Crystal Grotto ===
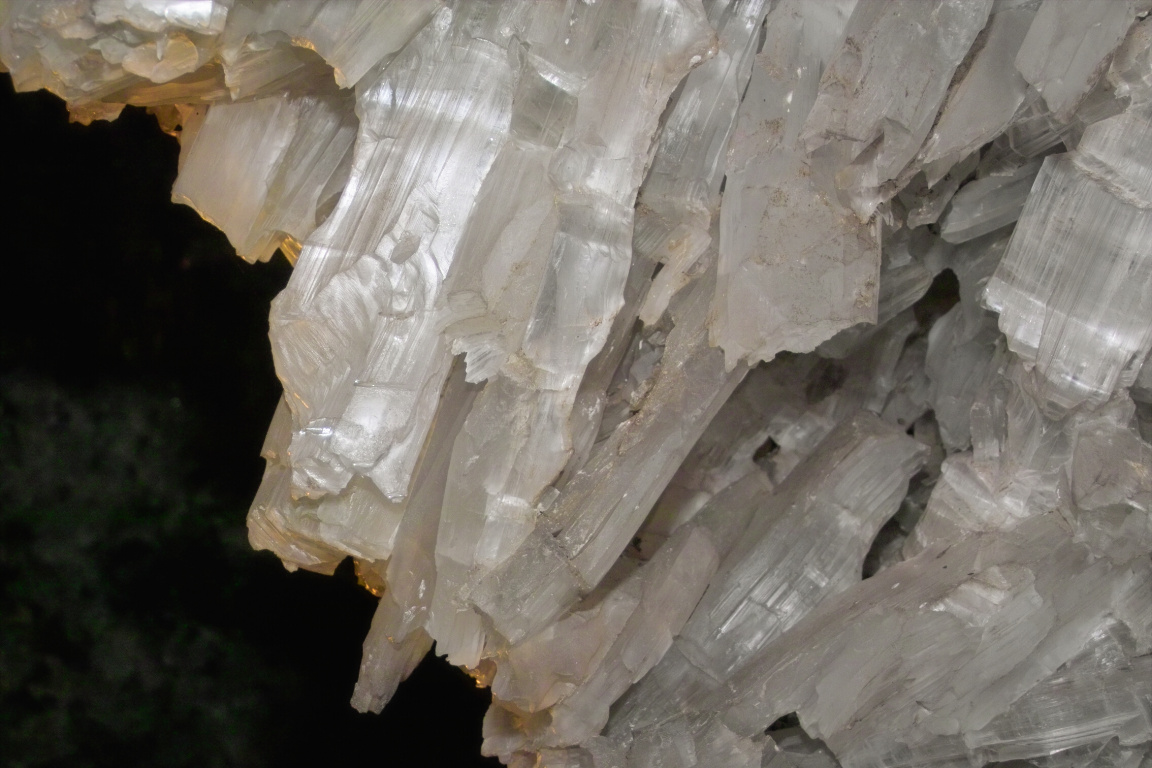
Marienglas, detail

In 1784 (or according to some sources, 1787), while engaged in gypsum mining, miners stumbled upon a substantial cavity formed by leaching. This cavity, entirely lined with gypsum crystals, earned the name Crystal Grotto. Following its discovery, mining operations shifted towards these crystals, with prominent customers being churches and monasteries. These gypsum crystals possessed distinctive qualities: they had a low hardness rating of two on the Mohs scale (making them scratchable with a fingernail), were transparent, and exhibited a nacreous luster on their cleavage surfaces, which enhanced their reflective properties when exposed to incident light. These attributes made them highly suitable for embellishing chandeliers, altars, and artworks illuminated by candles. Additionally, they served as a substitute for glass in depictions of the Virgin Mary and the crafting of reliquaries. Due to these characteristics, the gypsum crystals from Friedrichroda became renowned as 'Mary's Glass.' Notably, unlike the glass of that time, these crystals were free from bubbles and consistently thin. In the past, this material was sometimes referred to as women's ice, alluding to its association with purity and virginity.

=== Show and mining operations ===
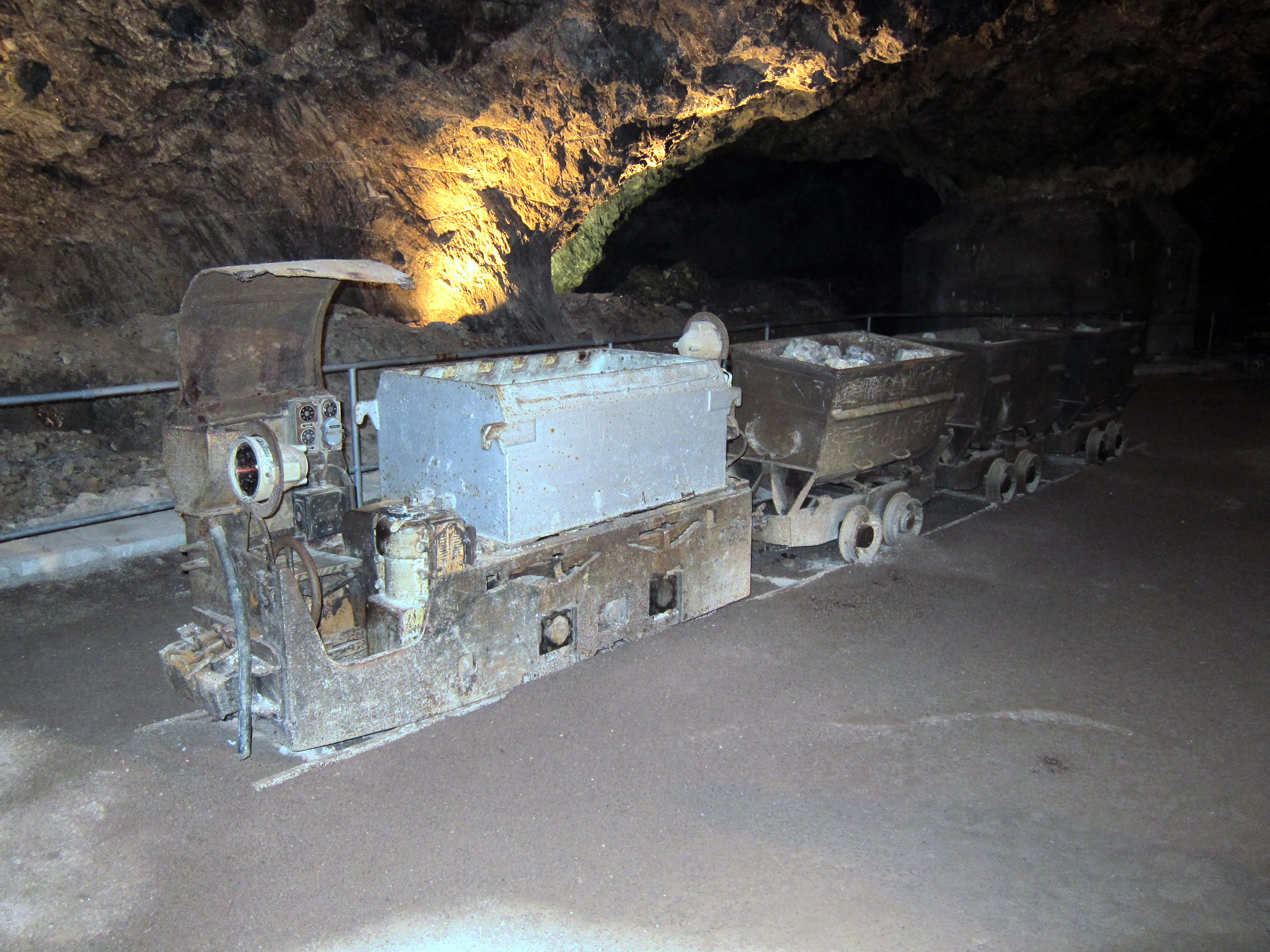
Lore in the show mine part

On September 16, 1845, Heinrich Credner, a mining master, published the first scientific description of the cave. Gypsum crystal mining continued until 1848 when further mining was prohibited. However, gypsum mining initially persisted. Around 1850, in response to a growing number of visitors, the cave began to be illuminated with candles on Sundays. By 1854, the Marienglashöhle was already featured in a Thuringian travel guide. Following the expiration of the mining lease on August 16, 1871, the Tenneberg office transferred the mine's management to Head Forester Julius Trebsdorf and 'Waldmiethcorporationsvorsteher' Rost. At that time, two miners, Johannes Steiding, and Heinrich Holdschuh, still worked in the mine and served as guides during the summer months. After an inspection in November 1871, Trebsdorf was tasked with various improvements, including relining the adit, installing new running boards, securing the open pit south of the adit entrance, and refurbishing the miners' recreation room. Additionally, an accommodation building was to be built. Heinrich Holdschuh, a seasoned miner who had been promoted to chief miner, assumed underground supervision and took over the management of the Marienglashöhle on March 2, 1876. To enhance its appeal, improvements like a fountain and visually appealing supporting pillars were added during periods of low visitor traffic. On April 1, 1888, Fritz Kobstädt succeeded Holdschuh. From April 1901, Karl Brühl and Heinrich Steinbach from Friedrichroda assumed his responsibilities.

=== Show cave ===
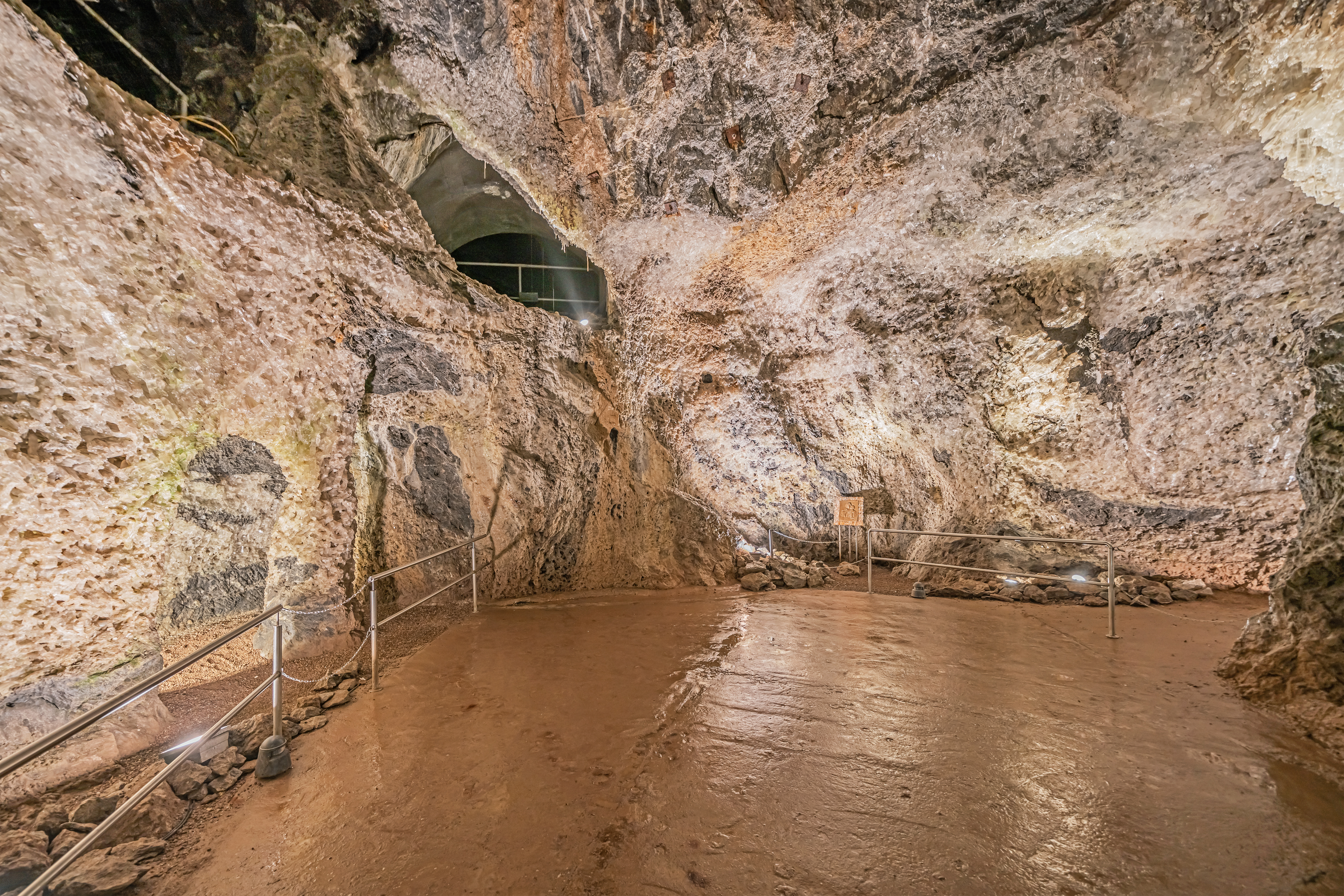
Crystal grotto, general view

In 1903, gypsum mining operations ceased. From the discovery of the deposit in 1778 until 1903, about 20,000 tons of gypsum were extracted from the cave. From then on, the cave was available only for tourists. Regular visitor traffic took place, which can be considered the official beginning of the show cave operation. The tour of the show cave encompassed the entrance gallery and the upper floor, which was supported by nine pillars, known as the Great Hall. Below it is the lower floor, housing the crystal grotto. In 1904, the two tenants invested in gas lighting, replacing the former candle illumination. To enhance its appeal, especially on Sundays, the cave was additionally lit with 400 candles, as mentioned in the New Guidebook of Friedrichroda and Surroundings in 1906. During this period, a guided tour of both the upper and lower levels costs 50 pfennigs for 20 minutes, with reduced rates for children. In 1907, a sales kiosk was established, offering minerals and souvenirs to visitors. The same year saw the installation of a new pumping station. In 1910, the gallery walls were reinforced with quarry stone masonry to a depth of four meters. However, the outbreak of World War I led to a scarcity of resources, including gas, gasoline, and even candles, which were used for cave illumination. Starting in 1914, the cave operators also had to contend with water influxes. By June 1917, the cave had to be closed. In 1920, the State Property Administration in Gotha handed over the significantly deteriorated cave to the Friedrichroda spa administration for free, under the condition that urgent repairs be undertaken. For an expenditure of approximately 12,000 Reichsmarks, master plumber Windau installed a 230-meter-long siphon pipe to address the seeping water issue. Extensive renovation and safety measures were then carried out, allowing the cave to be reopened. In 1929, an electric line was laid to illuminate the show objects within. Additionally, in 1929, the Thuringian Forest Railway established a stop below the cave, providing easier access for visitors.

During the Second World War, a portion of the Gothaer Waggonfabrik production facility was situated within the cave. This area, covering approximately 5,000 square meters, was used for the manufacturing of components for the Focke-Wulf Ta 152 fighter aircraft. In the initial stages of the war, the cave remained accessible to visitors. However, in the spring of 1943, it was closed to the public due to a lack of funds for maintenance. Following the war, no maintenance efforts were undertaken. Consequently, without proper pumping to control water ingress, all the cavities within the cave gradually filled with water, and the access gallery eventually collapsed.

=== New opening ===
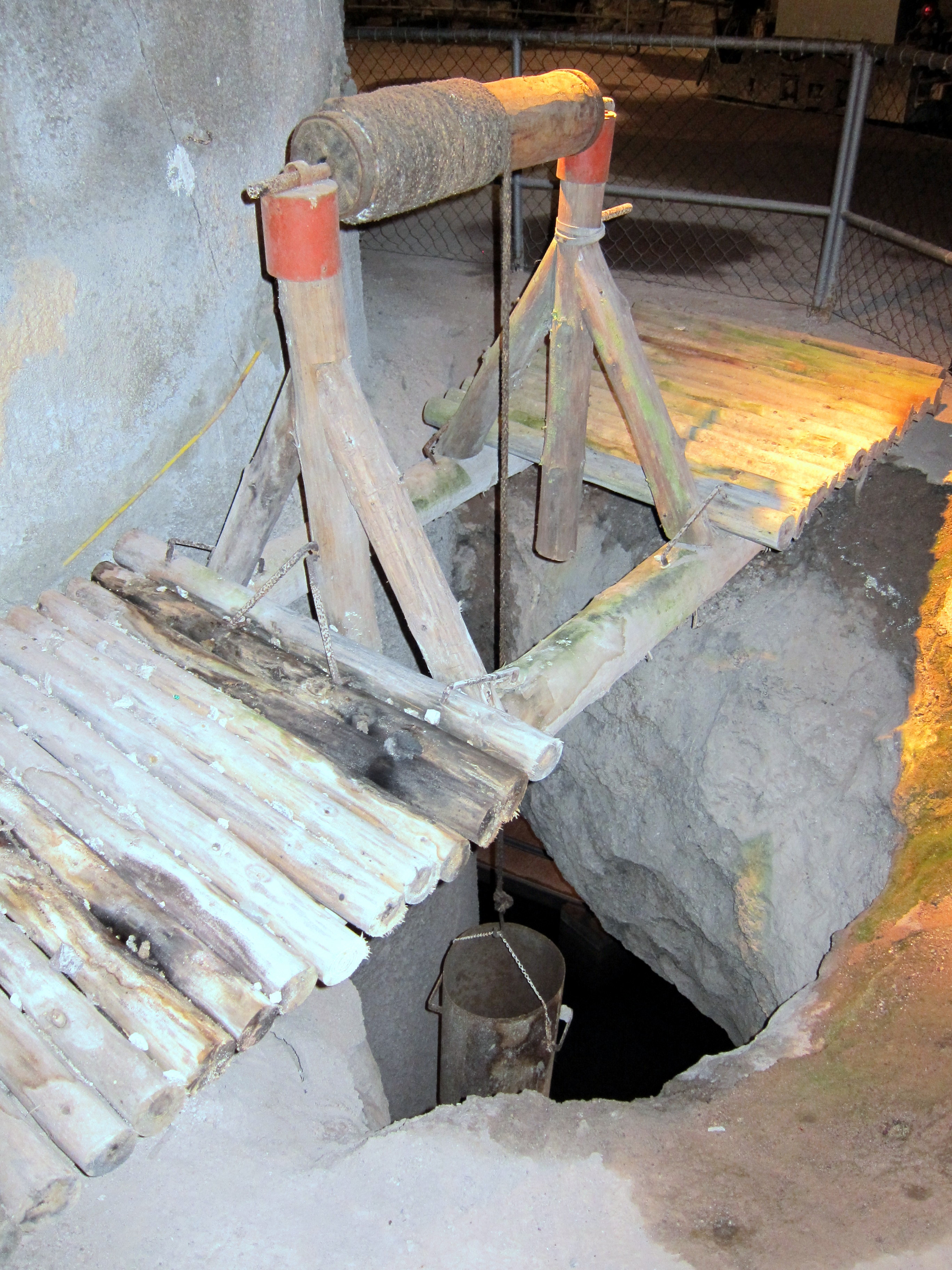
Model of a reel

In 1952 and 1953, miners from VEB Schachtbau Nordhausen searched within the neglected site for copper mulm. Copper mulm is a loose copper ore mixed with other metals and was used as a dye. However, the deposit was not sufficiently substantial for mining, leading to the cessation of the search after excavating a total of 312 meters. In 1964, preparations began for the reopening of the Marienglashöhle on behalf of the Friedrichroda town council. The following year, miners from the VEB Thüringer Spat- und Eisenerzgruben in Schmalkalden entered the collapsed gallery and advanced to reach the cave. The Friedrichroda fire department played a crucial role in draining the cave, employing powerful pumps for this purpose. A comprehensive restoration effort was undertaken in 1967 and 1968, spanning a total of 16 months. During this restoration, an artificial waterfall was created, utilizing water pumped up from the cave lake on the lower level. Additionally, an exit gallery was built, allowing visitors to follow a circular route. The entrance gallery, known as the Herzog-Ernst gallery, was rebuilt, and equipped with five geological windows, offering visitors insights into the geological structure of the cave. In the same year, the Crystal Grotto was designated as a protected geological natural monument. On November 30, 1968, this exhibition and educational site was reopened to visitors. In 1974, another tunnel dating back to the 18th century was discovered. Over time, the cave complex has continually been improved and adjusted to better cater to the needs of visitors.

== Show cave or show mine ==
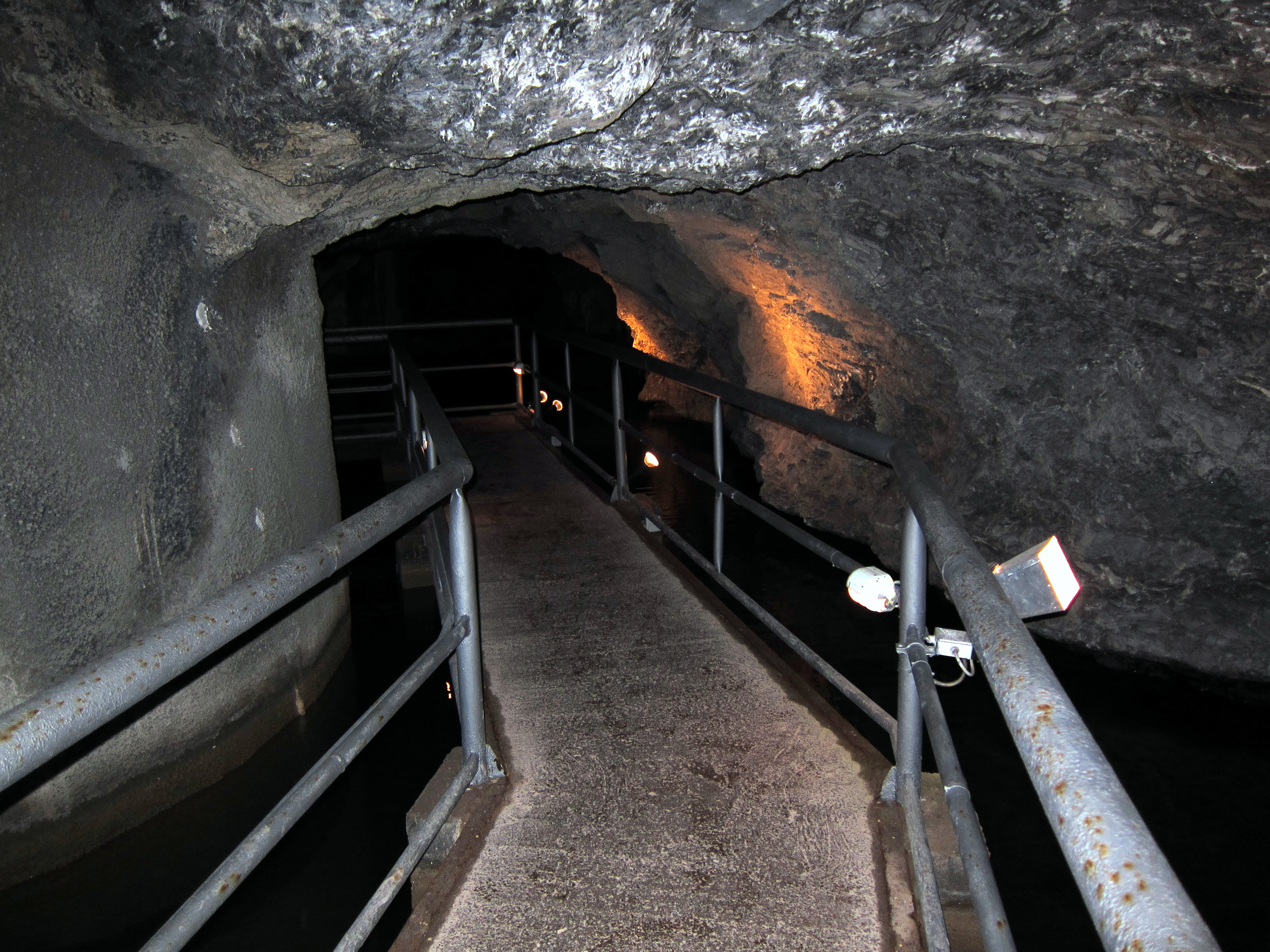
Footbridge over the cave lake

The facility is commonly referred to as both a show cave and a show mine. The accessible upper and lower levels of the cave were primarily created through mining activities spanning approximately 100 years. During this process, the natural crystal grotto, the only natural cavity in the cave, was discovered, which contributed significantly to the popularity of the site among visitors. The show cave operator refers to the facility as a show mine. The high visitor attraction is largely attributed to the presence of the natural crystal grotto. In technical literature, the facility is referred to as both a mine and a show cave. The Association of German Cave and Karst Researchers designates it as a show cave, as does the Thuringian Institute for the Environment and Geology based in Jena. On the other hand, the Cave Register of Central Germany, maintained by the Dresden Cave Research Group (Roland H. Winkelhöfer), does not classify the facility as a cave due to its formation through human activity, including gypsum mining.

== Description ==
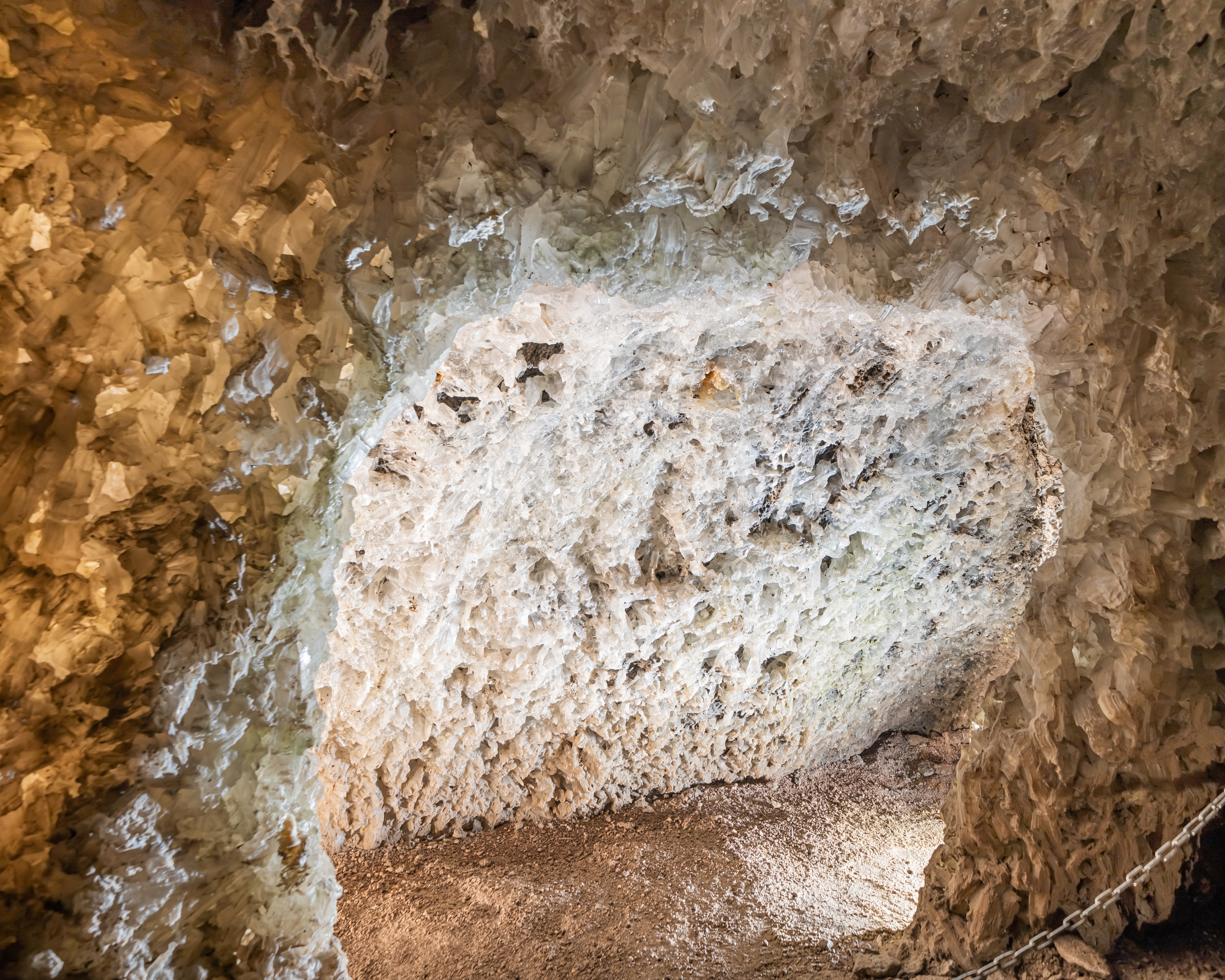
Crystal grotto, detail

The cave tour commences in the Herzog-Ernst-Stollen, a 110-meter-long gallery, where visitors receive explanations about the history of the show complex and learn about the formation of the Thuringian Forest. Within this gallery, there are geological windows on both sides of the wall, allowing for views of the rock layers and their steep positioning. Towards the end of the gallery on the left side, the guide activates an artificial waterfall for approximately one minute. Following this, the gallery widens as an extension of the entrance gallery, leading to the doorway. While the gallery continues for another 100 meters into the mountain, this part is not typically included in guided tours. Mining efforts in this section did not yield valuable ore. In the center of the large cavity created by mining, there is a reel at the die, which was the former workplace. Adjacent to the die's pillar, a showcase displays tools used by miners in 1795. At this location, a reel and pit cage were employed to transport crushed gypsum rock from the lower to the upper level.

Visitors then descend to the crystal grotto, which holds significant geological and mineralogical importance. Within this grotto, gypsum crystals, some as long as 90 cm, can be found, along with rapidly growing dripstones, stalagmites, and stalactites made of calcium sulfate. A portion of the wall is encrusted with sinter, characterized by a brownish color due to iron ores. The cave lake is bridged by a 70-meter-long man-made footbridge, then 35 steps lead to the western part of the show cave on the upper level. Along this path, visitors can observe stalactites of recent origin, which formed after the expansion of the cave in 1967/1968. These stalactites consist of lime that dissolved from the concrete columns. Additionally, fibrous gypsum that developed secondarily can be seen between layers of clay and lettuce. Showcases exhibit minerals, rocks, and fossils. Visitors exit the cave through the exit gallery.

== Flora and fauna ==
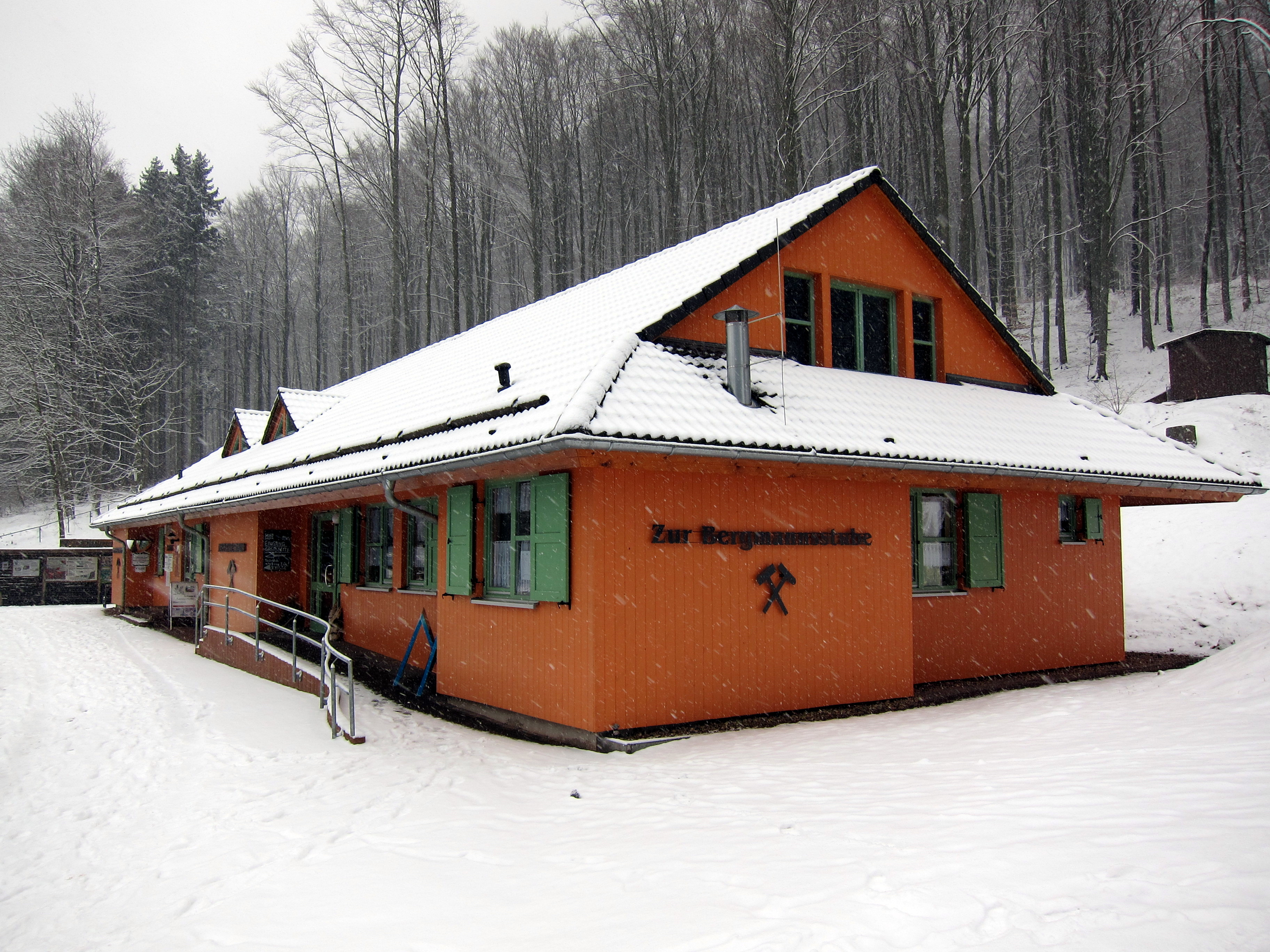
Company building

Various species of spiders (Nesticidae) reside on the ceiling in the galleries of the cave entrance and exit. Additionally, sporadic sightings of fire salamanders (Salamandra salamandra) have occurred within the cave. These salamanders enter the cave through the access tunnels, although they are not typically considered cave enthusiasts (troglophiles). Notably, the Marienglashöhle, like other underground show caves with electric lighting, has fostered the development of a distinctive plant community known as lamp flora in the vicinity of the lamps. This plant community primarily consists of algae, mosses, fungi, and ferns. These are typically stunted forms that could not thrive in absolute darkness without artificial lighting. The distribution of these plants is not uniform and depends on factors such as the entry of spores into the cave through seepage water from the Earth's surface or their introduction by cave visitors. In some areas of the cave, limited or no lamp flora has developed due to dry conditions.

== Tourism ==
=== Guided tours ===
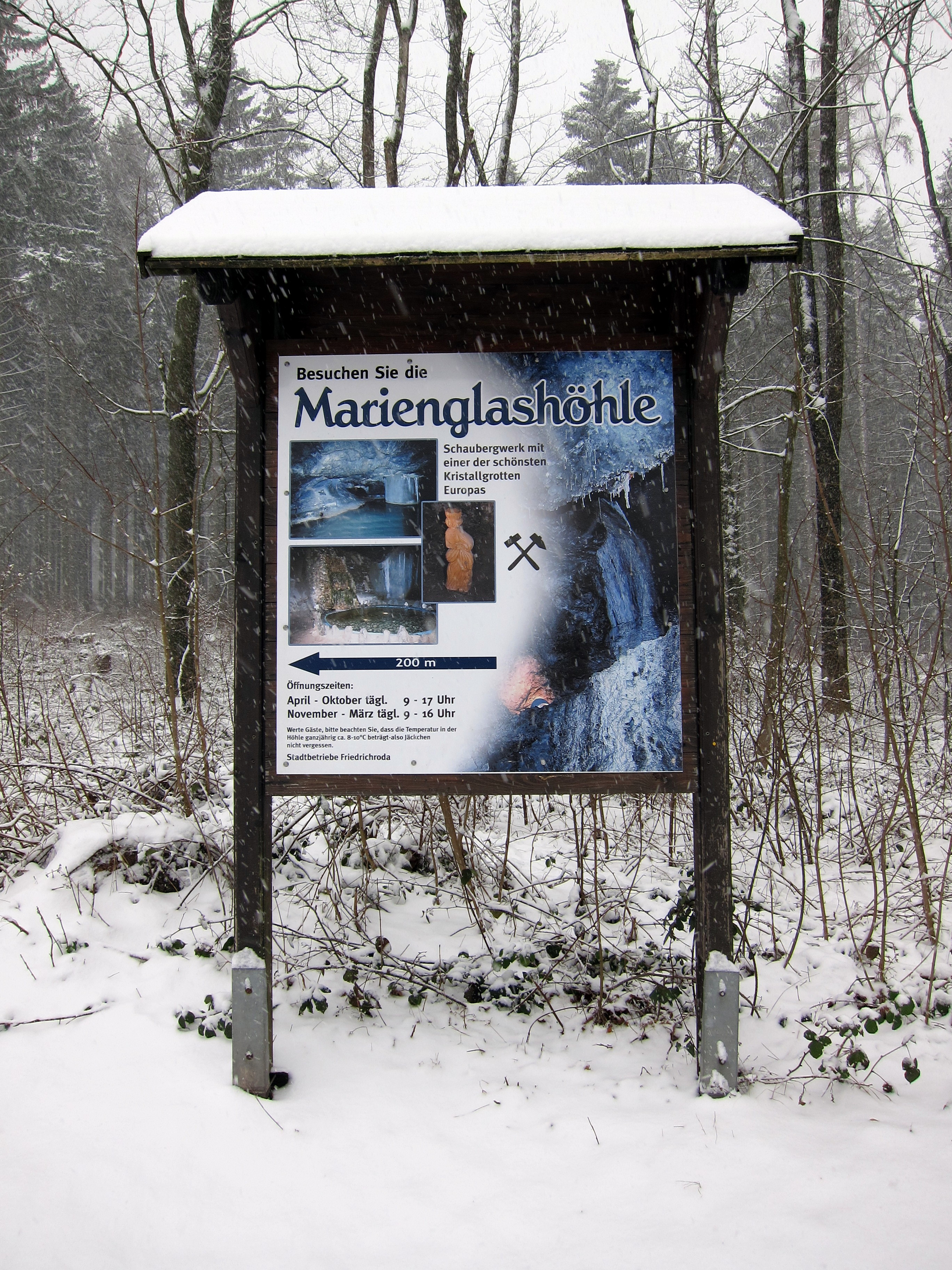
Information board

The cave is accessible exclusively through guided tours, which are conducted daily throughout the year. Special tours and concerts are also available. It can be reached from a large parking lot on the main road 88 Friedrichroda-Bad Tabarz. From there, a 150-meter footpath leads to the cave in about five minutes. People with walking impairments can take a motor vehicle to the cave. The Thuringian Forest Railway also passes near the cave, and it can be reached from the streetcar stop of the same name.

The guided tours follow well-maintained paths and stairways that lead into various sections of the cave. The cave maintains a constant temperature of about eight to ten degrees Celsius and has humidity levels exceeding 80 percent. A typical guided tour lasts approximately 45 minutes and covers a path of about 300 meters, which includes about 100 steps. The upper level of the cave is accessible to wheelchair users, offering a view of the crystal grotto. Additionally, there are specialized tours with extended services, as well as tours conducted in English and French. Several times a year, concerts are held in the Marienglashöhle, and the cave is beautifully illuminated with several hundred candles during these events.

=== Visitor numbers ===
Since its reopening in November 1968, the Marienglashöhle experienced varying visitor numbers. In its first year, 1969, after reopening, it attracted 216,773 visitors. The 1970s saw the highest annual visitor numbers, consistently exceeding 200,000. The peak was in 1978 when 237,750 visitors explored the cave, a figure matched by only a few show caves in Germany. During the 1980s, visitor numbers ranged from 175,847 in 1982 to 221,460 in 1988. Following German reunification, visitor numbers dipped below 100,000 for the first time in 1991, with 92,132 visitors. Although there was a temporary peak in 1995 with 146,918 visitors, numbers gradually declined below the 100,000 mark from 2003 onward. In 2011, the cave welcomed 68,416 visitors, marking an all-time low since its reopening. As of the end of 2011, a total of 6.59 million people had visited the cave since its reopening.

From 2006 to 2010, the Marienglashöhle welcomed an average of 72,006 visitors annually, which positions it in the upper range of German show caves. However, in terms of annual visitors, it is surpassed by five of the approximately 50 show caves in Germany. These caves are the Atta Cave, which sees about 150,000 to 200,000 visitors, the Devil's Cave near Pottenstein with an average of 156,100 visitors from 2006 to 2010, the Hermann Cave with 93,100 visitors, the Charles, and Bear Cave with 90,700 visitors, and the Baumann Cave with 80,600 visitors each year.

=== Events ===
Between September and December, exclusive “Underground” concerts take place in the cave, from rock & pop to gospel and Irish folk.

=== Get married in the Marienglashöhle ===
The registry office of the city of Friedrichroda offers weddings in the cave.

== See also ==
- List of show caves in Germany
