= Conococheague =

Conococheague may refer to some locations in the eastern United States, as well as a geological formation that outcrops in the same area:

- Conococheague Creek, a tributary of the Potomac River
- Conococheague Mountain, a ridge in Perry County, Pennsylvania
- Wilson-Conococheague, Maryland, a combination of the communities of Wilson and Conococheague
- Conococheague Formation, a geologic formation
