= S. tumefaciens =

S. tumefaciens may refer to:

- Stalagmites tumefaciens, an ascomycete fungus
- Sphaeropsis tumefaciens, an ascomycete fungus that is a plant pathogen infecting citruses
