= Camel's Den Cave =

Shelter cave in Howard County, Maryland

Coordinates: 39°18′43″N 76°48′53″W

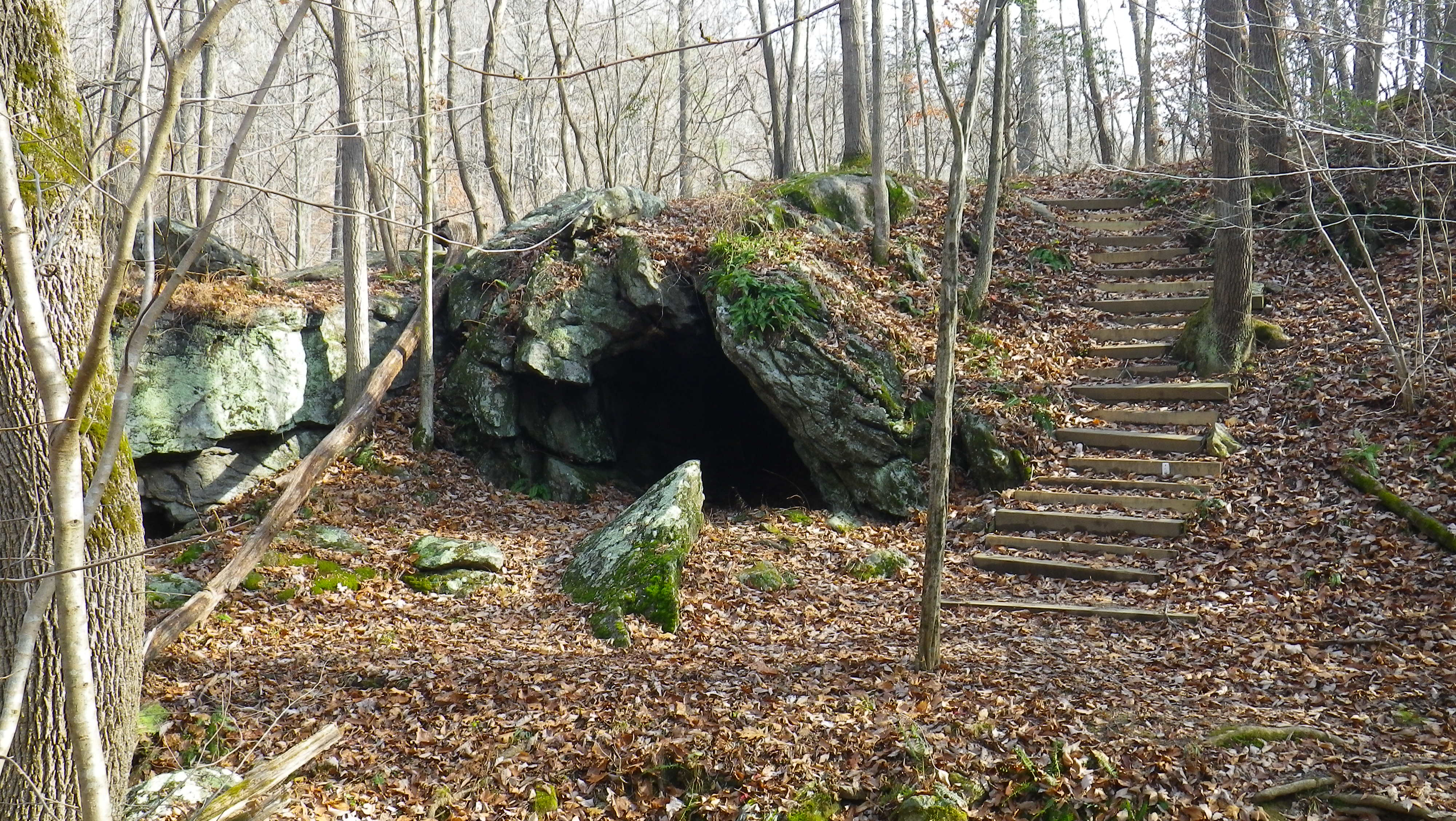
Image of Camel’s Den Cave

Camel's Den Cave is a small shelter cave located in the Patapsco Valley State Park, near Daniels, Maryland. It is a tectonic cave and the only cave in Howard County, Maryland intended for public access as an attraction.

== Description ==
Camel's Den Cave is a shallow rock shelter of a gneiss area of the Setters Formation.

== History ==
There has been at least 2 archeological digs, which recovered a plethora of objects. Based on the date of the journal, the 2 archeological digs occurred prior to June 1950. Baltimore archaeologist Steve Israel recalled a 1969 report about 2 rock shelters and various Native American related archaeological sites in the area around Camels Den. Steve Israel said their exact location was kept secret to preserve the caves until there can be a “proper” study. An unspecified time prior to verbatim study, a man named Samuel Evans also claimed to have discovered 2 rock shelters in Camel's Den vicinity, he named them after the former name for the cave-adjacent town of Daniels, Maryland. He named them "Elysville 1" and "Elysville 2". Native Americans gave the cave its name. In 1943, the Natural History Society of Maryland wrote that the cave had been used by Native Americans for "beer and card parties". A test digging, also in 1943, revealed no more remaining artifacts in Camel's Den Cave. The cave had been known to Indigenous peoples for centuries before white settlers knew about it. Indigenous people were known to have used the cave for hunting parties. William Bridner, a local trapper, collected many Indigenous artifacts from the cave during the 1920s and 1930s.

== Location ==
The cave is situated on an unnamed tributary of the Patapsco River. To reach Camel's Den Cave, visitors take a spur trail from the main path, crossing said tributary to find the cave in the hillside.
