= Spur Trail =

Walking trail in California, United States

Coordinates: 37°35′38″N 122°23′43″W

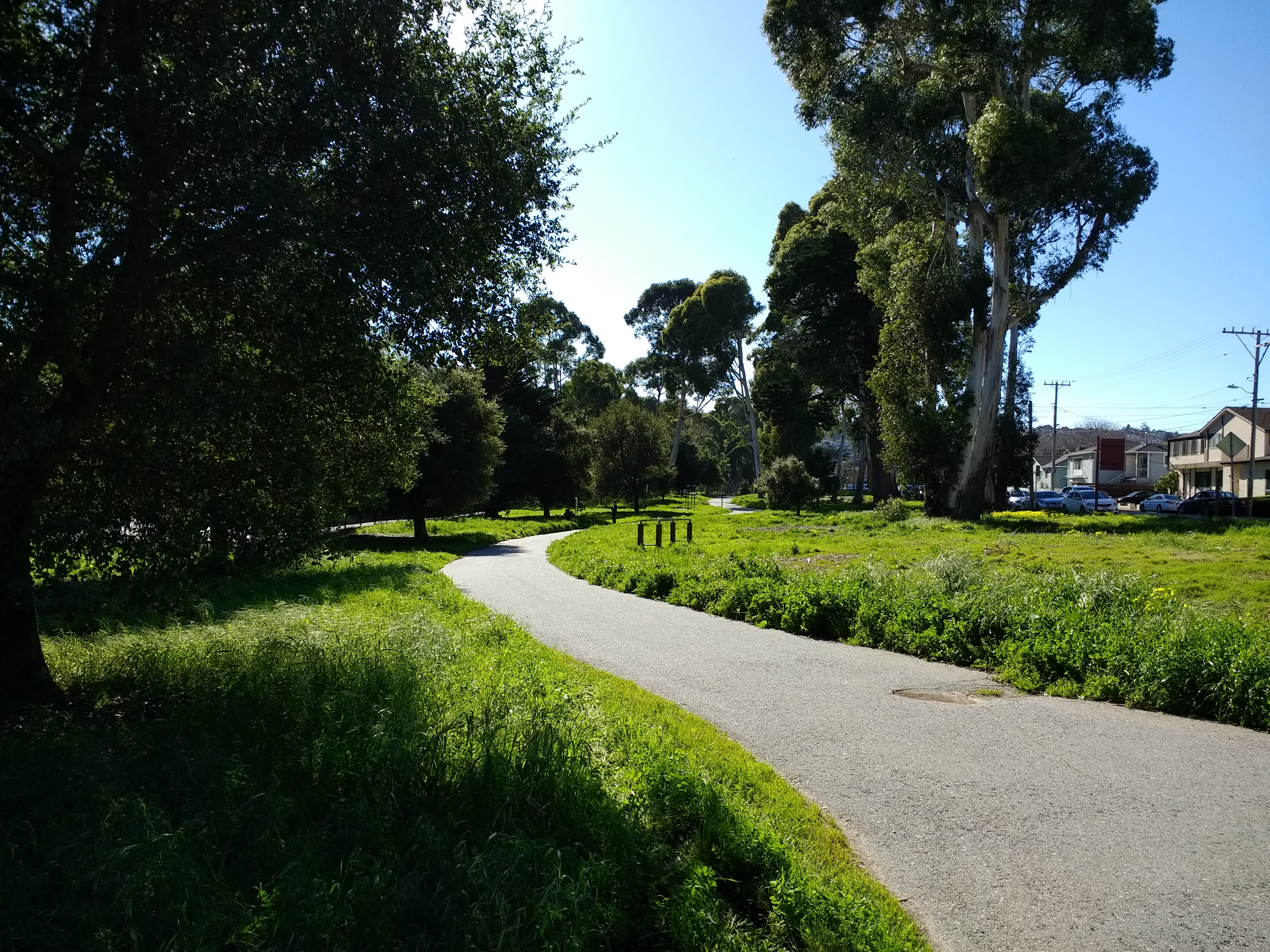
The southern section of Spur Trail

The Spur Trail is a paved walking trail in San Mateo County, California, south of San Francisco. It is located in Millbrae on Spur Property parkland. The pathway consists of two disjointed sections; one is located to the west of Taylor Middle School and the other is located north of Mills High School. The trail and its associated park is an important recreational opportunity for local residents.

== History ==
The Spur Property was originally set aside for the Junipero Serra Boulevard expansion project. Local opposition to this plan was intense, since the new freeway would have split Millbrae in half. Accordingly, the project was shelved and the Spur Property remained open land. In 1975, most of the Spur Property was rezoned as open space, closing the land to developers. However, some parts of the property, such as the plot located on the southwest corner of the El Camino Real and Millbrae Avenue intersection, was developed into the Hong Kong Flower Lounge in the 1980s. The rest of the land remained a park, but in early 2004, as Millbrae was bedecked by budget shortfalls, the city proposed to sell parkland in order to resolve its financial issues. Like the highway plan, there was fierce opposition to this action.

== Description ==
=== Northern section ===
The northern segment of the trail has a north–south orientation. The trail begins on Richmond Drive on the northwest corner of Taylor Middle School. It goes uphill slightly as it heads southeast into a grove of oak and eucalyptus trees. From then on, the linear trail goes into an open field and runs just to the west of Taylor Middle School's H-wing classrooms. Heading into another patch of eucalyptus trees, the trail crosses two streets as it skirts the southwest corner of Taylor Middle School. South of the middle school, the twisty trail ascends and descends through a grassy field until it ends on Hillcrest Boulevard.

=== Southern section ===
Located about half a mile (800 m) south of the northern segment, the southern part of the Spur trail has an east–west orientation. It begins on South Ashton Drive close to where Millbrae Creek dives underground. The trail heads east through a grove filled with different types of trees, ranging from oak and Monterey pine to the west to mostly eucalyptus to the east. The trail roughly parallels Millbrae Creek for a tiny distance where the creek re-emerges from the ground but then disappears underground under the path. As the trail twists and turns through the Spur property parkland, it parallels Millbrae Avenue and skirts the northern friges of Mills High School's running track/football and baseball fields. The trail turns by several tennis courts and a YMCA skatepark before terminating on the corner of Millbrae Avenue and Magnolia Drive about two blocks away from the Millbrae Station.
