= Elbrook Formation =

Geologic formation in West Virginia

- Stratigraphic range: Cambrian
- Part of an outcrop of the Elbrook in Fairfield, Virginia
- Type: Formation
- Underlies: Conococheague Formation
- Overlies: Waynesboro Formation

Location
- Region: Appalachia and Southeastern United States
- Country: United States
- Extent: Virginia and West Virginia

The Elbrook Formation is a geologic formation in Virginia, West Virginia, Maryland, and Pennsylvania. It dates back to the Cambrian period. Fossils of trilobite fragments have been discovered, but they are rare. The Elbrook Formation is not considered fossiliferous.

The Elbrook is described in southern Virginia as light-gray to dark bluish-gray, thin-bedded, fine-grained dolomite with some dark bluish-gray magnesian limestone and light-green to dark-gray shale, and rare red shale.
