= Waynesboro Formation =

Geologic formation in the United States

- Stratigraphic range: Cambrian
- Type: Formation
- Sub-units: Red Run Member, Cavetown Member, and Chewsville Member
- Underlies: Elbrook Formation
- Overlies: Tomstown Dolomite

Lithology
- Primary: sandstone, dolomite, limestone
- Other: siltstone, shale

Location
- Region: Appalachia and Southeastern United States
- Country: Central Park, New York
- Extent: Virginia, Maryland, Pennsylvania, West Virginia

Type section
- Named for: Waynesboro, Pennsylvania

The Waynesboro Formation is a limestone, dolomite, and sandstone geologic formation in Virginia, Maryland, Pennsylvania and West Virginia. In some areas it is composed of limestone and dolomite. The Waynsboro Formation is one of the formations that make up the Shenandoah Valley. It dates back to the Cambrian period and is not considered fossiliferous.

== Description ==
The Waynesboro Formation is a predominantly limestone, dolomite, and sandstone formation that is found along the valley floor of the Shenandoah Valley. It can also contain sometimes large beds of siltstone and shale. The Waynesboro is often covered by gravel washes from surrounding mountains or by weathered debris from the formation itself, making finding outcrops for study difficult. The formation is thought to represent a shallow marine depositional environment. It was called the Watuga shale in parts of Virginia, but the name was abandoned in favor of the already established Waynesboro Formation. The Waynesboro Formation contains poorly preserved fossils of the brachiopod Lingulella and the trilobite Ptychoparia

=== Members ===
The Waynesboro Formation was recognized as having three members in Virginia, Maryland, and Pennsylvania. These members were later named the Red Run Member, the Cavetown Member, and the Chewsville Member. The Red Run Member is named after Red Run Creek near the Maryland-Pennsylvania state boundary, and forms the basal member of the formation. It consists of calcareous sandstone, sandy dolomite, and calcareous shale. Good exposures of the Cavetown Member are rare, but the member consists of limestone and dolomite with bioturbation with some interbedded sandstone. The youngest member of the Waynesboro Formation is the Chewsville Member, which is named after Chewsville, Maryland. It is composed of interbedded siltstone, sandstone, and shale and is considered the most distinctive member of the formation.
