= Conococheague Formation =

Geologic formation in the United States

- Stratigraphic range: Cambrian
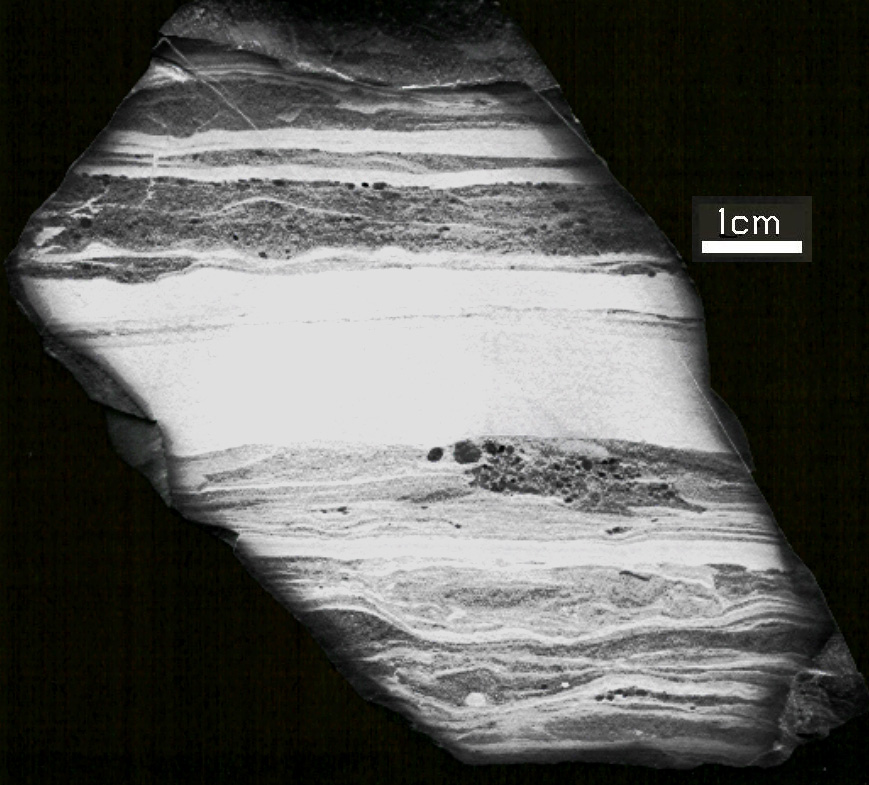
- Etched section of rock from the Conococheague Formation from Washington County, Maryland (dolomite is lighter than the limestone)
- Type: sedimentary
- Sub-units: Big Spring Station Member
- Underlies: Beekmantown Dolomite
- Overlies: Elbrook Formation

Lithology
- Primary: Limestone
- Other: dolomite, sandstone

Location
- Region: Appalachian Basin of eastern North America
- Extent: Maryland, Pennsylvania, Virginia, West Virginia

Type section
- Named for: Conococheague Creek
- Named by: G. W. Stose, 1908

The Conococheague Formation is a mapped Appalachian bedrock unit of Cambrian age, consisting primarily of limestone and dolomite. It occurs in central Maryland, southern and central Pennsylvania, the Valley and Ridge of Virginia and easternmost West Virginia.

== Description ==
=== Depositional environment ===
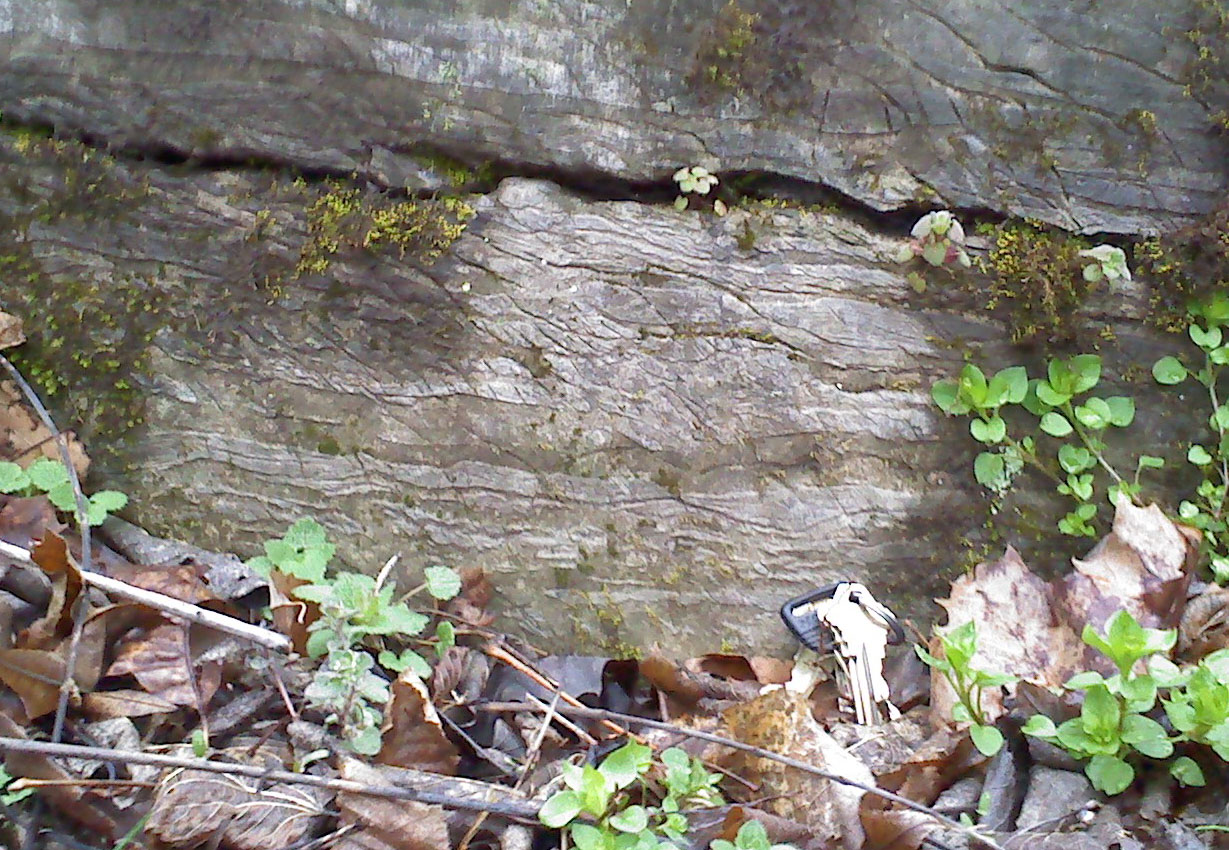
Outcrop along Antietam Creek, near Hagerstown.

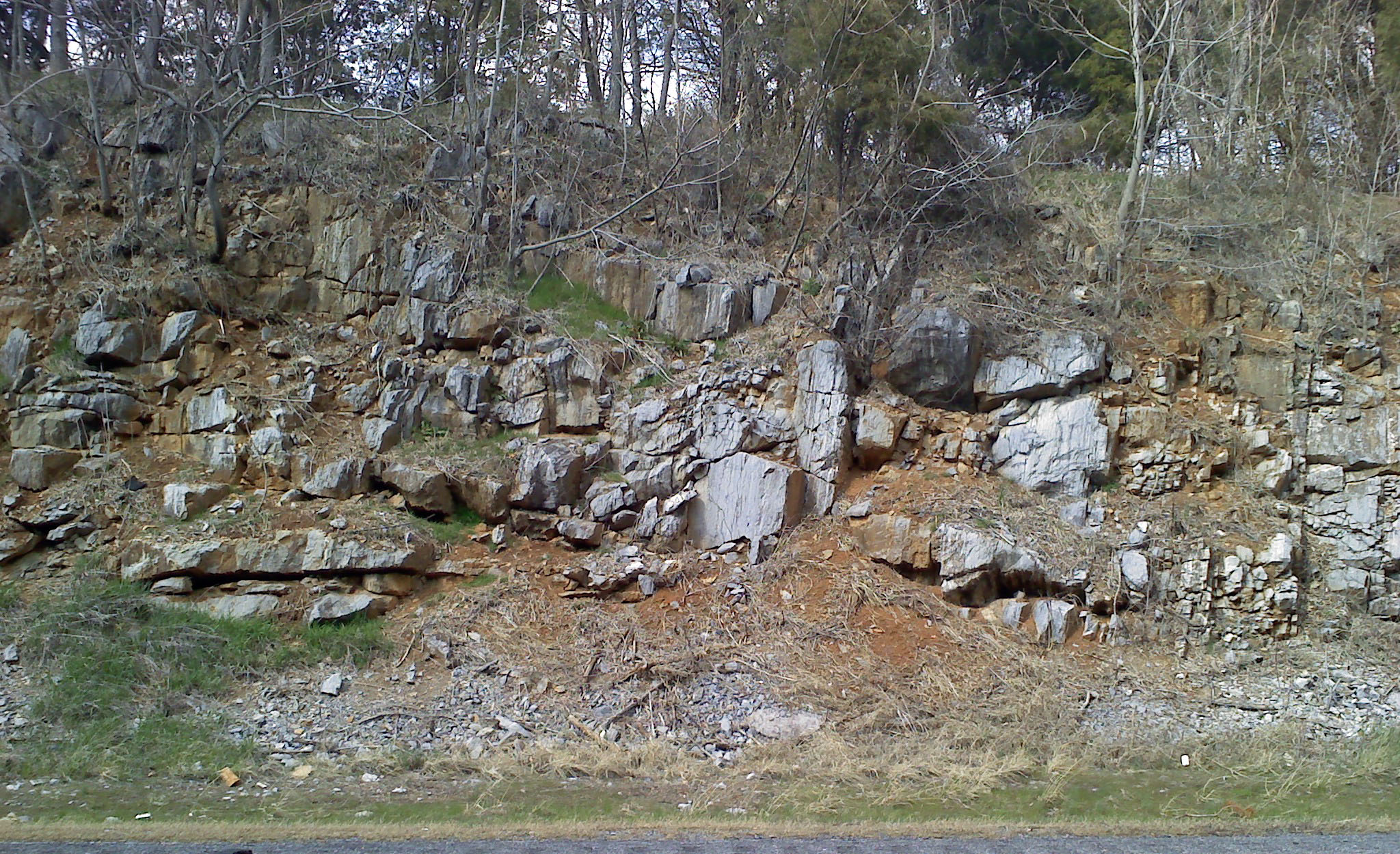
Outcrop along I-70, Mile Marker 20.5

The depositional environment of the Conococheague was most likely shallow marine to tidal on a carbonate platform.

=== Notable exposures ===
The type section is located at Scotland in Franklin County, Pennsylvania (northeast of Chambersburg).

Accessible outcrops occur along various roadcuts and waterways in the area, including roadcuts near mile marker 20 of I-70 near Hagerstown, Maryland. The bedding at this site is nearly vertical, with the strike nearly perpendicular to the highway, and thus one can easily walk up and down the sections.

The Conococheague also forms dramatic, 100-foot cliffs along the Potomac River upstream of Shepherdstown, West Virginia (northwest of Harpers Ferry), where entrenched meanders expose mile-long sections of tilted Conococheague strata. These may be easily seen from the towpath trail of the Chesapeake and Ohio Canal National Historical Park along the Maryland bank of the Potomac. In Shepherdstown itself, the top of a Conococheague cliff provides the setting for the monument to steamboat-inventor James Rumsey.

=== Fossils ===
Conodonts are present in the Conococheague.

Thrombolites and the possible chiton Matthevia are present in the Boxley Blue Ridge Quarry in Bedford County, Virginia.

== Age ==
Relative-age dating of the Conococheague places it in the Upper Cambrian period.
