= Crystal Grottoes =

Cave in Maryland, United States

Coordinates: 39.498°N 77.677°W

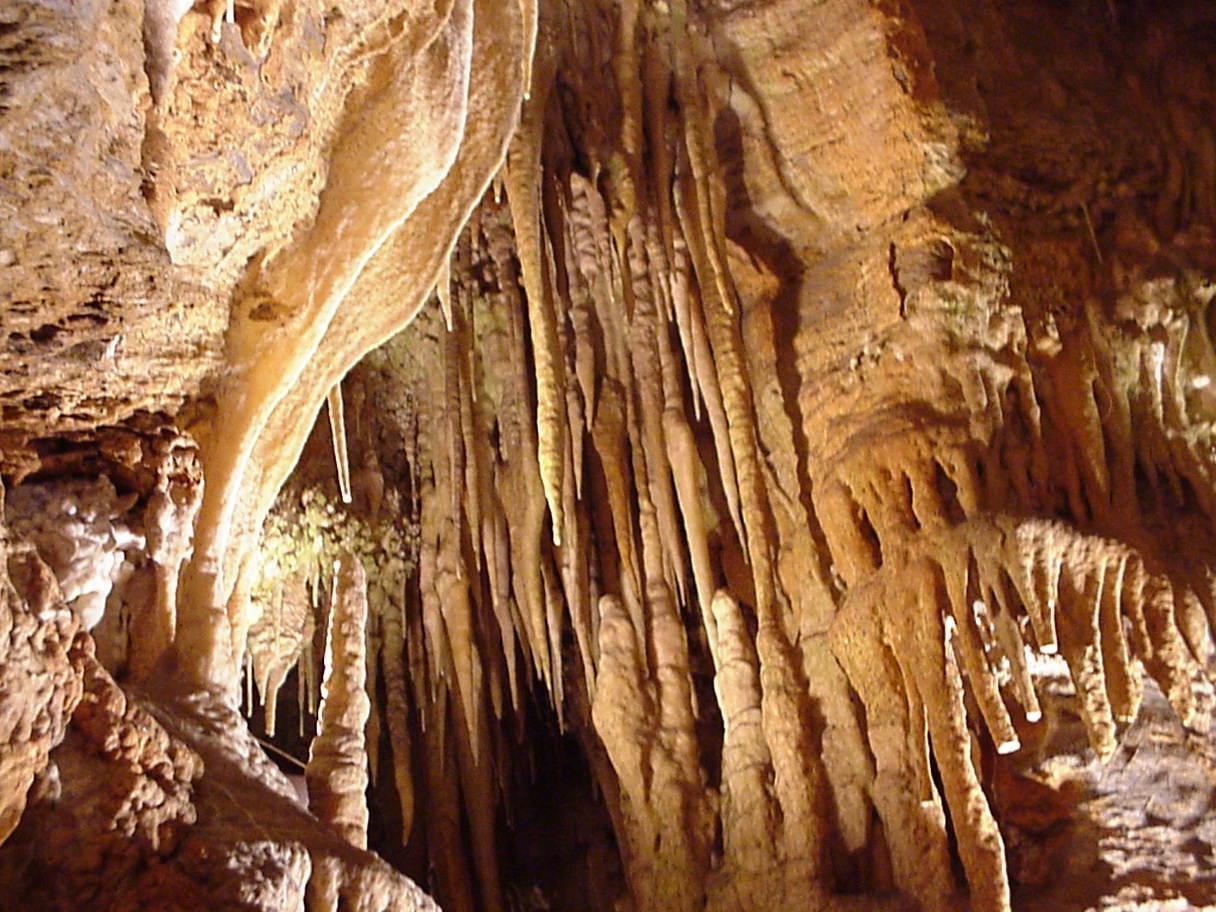
Twin Ribbons in The Crystal Grottoes

Crystal Grottoes is the only show cave in the U.S. state of Maryland. It is located on Maryland Route 34 between Boonsboro and Antietam National Battlefield.

== History ==
Crystal Grottoes was discovered in 1920 in the course of quarrying operations by a road construction crew trying to obtain gravel. A drill bit (for placing explosives) disappeared into a hole, and the crew realized they had found a cave. Blasting produced the entrance which is still used, and in 1922 the cave was opened to the public. A mapping operation in 1968 revealed about a half mile of passages, but only about one third of the cave is accessed during the tour, which takes about 30–35 minutes.

== Geology ==
Crystal Grottoes is an example of a solutional cave, formed in a karst environment within a synclinal occurrence of Tomstown Dolomite. The cave is essentially horizontal throughout its extent and the passages are typically high and narrow. A great deal of brown and red clay fills most of the cave to a considerable extent; the commercial tour routes involved the removal of up to 4–6 feet (1.2–1.8 m) of this clay in 900 feet (270 m) of the passages. Sediment fills many of the undeveloped passages to within a foot or two of the ceiling, thereby making many crawlways. No streams exist in the cave, although a small "lake" or pool is maintained by drip water.

== Description ==
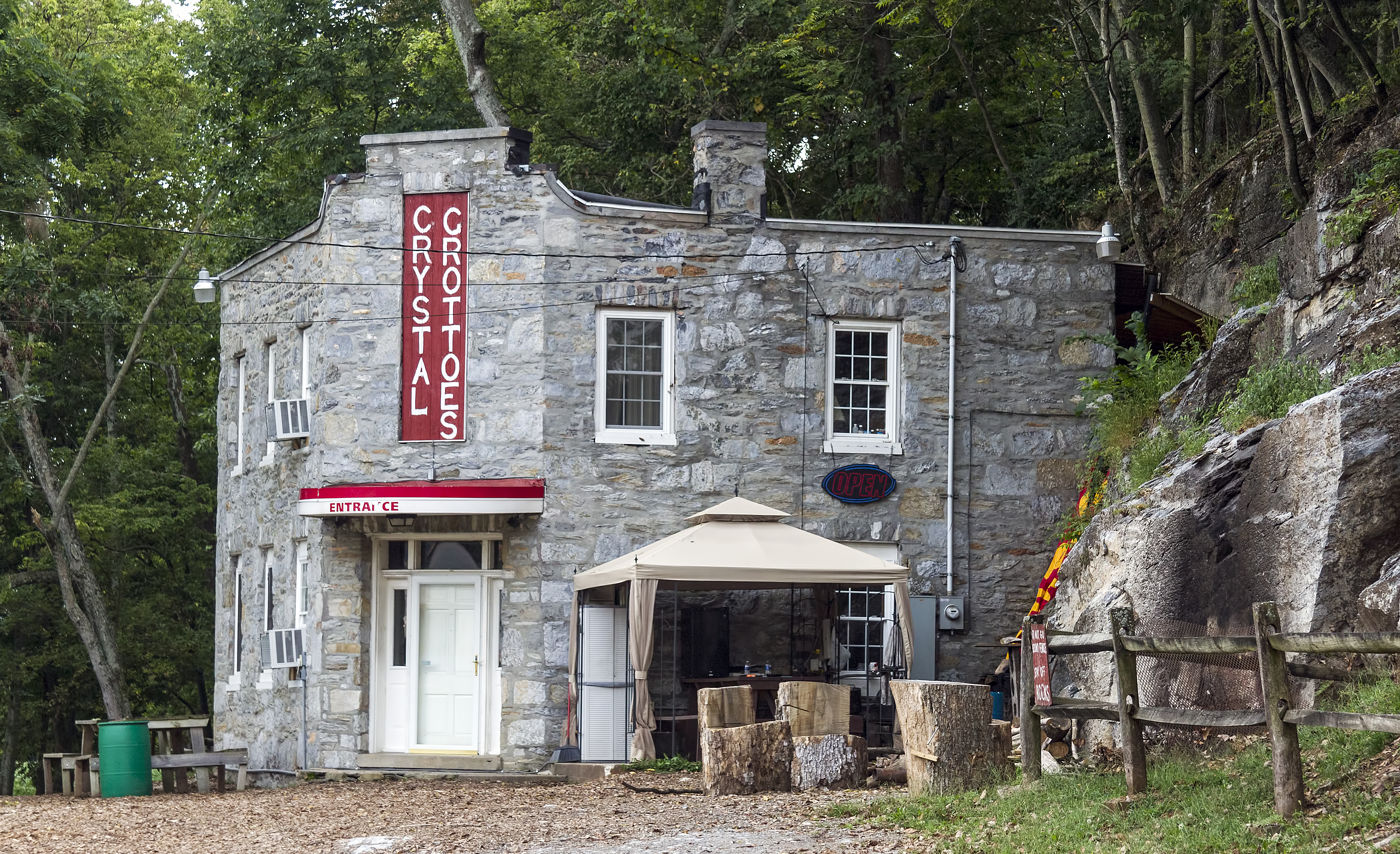
The building at the entrance to Crystal Grottoes

Most of the rooms abound in speleothem formations, generally stalactites, flowstone, and columns. They are typically white or buff, with one area (called Fairyland) tinted a light red, by iron oxides.

The first room is 8 feet (2.4 m) below the entrance house and is oblate in shape, being 30 feet (9.1 m) long, 10 feet (3.0 m) wide, and 15 feet (4.6 m) high. At each end it is pinched out by mud flows and narrowing of the passage. This room originally contained a considerable number of formations, but quarrying operations and clearing of passages have removed them except along the west wall where flowstone and stalactites are abundant.

The passages are continuously lined or covered by formations. Delicate draperies, bacon, and columns predominate. The colors are generally pure white or buff with occasional deeper tints. The passages forming Fairyland are studded with stalactites and stalagmites of a delicate light red hue.

The Blanket Room is the largest room in the caverns at 30 feet (9.1 m) long and 20 feet (6.1 m) wide. Large sheets of stalactites and draperies hang in clusters from the ceiling, which is here 20 feet (6.1 m) high.

The passage leading to the lake is profuse with formations and in part is bridged by flat-lying travertine, a condition that is found in many of the passages not open to the public. The lake is a small pool fed by water dripping from the ceiling. In wet seasons the water accumulates at a rate necessitating periodic bailing.

The passages not open to the public are similar to those already described except they are constricted at many points. Orange-brown clay that covers the floor and lower walls of these passages is often overlain by calcareous formations. The commercial tour route covers approximately one third of the known cave.
