= Stalagmites (fungus) =

Scientific classification
- Kingdom: Fungi
- Division: Ascomycota
- Class: Sordariomycetes
- Order: Hypocreales
- Family: Nectriaceae
- Genus: Stalagmites; Theiss. & Syd. 1914
- Species: S. tumefaciens

Binomial name
- Stalagmites tumefaciens (Syd. & P. Syd.) Theiss. & Syd. 1914

Genus of fungi

Stalagmites is a genus of ascomycete fungi in the family Nectriaceae. It is a monotypic genus containing the sole species Stalagmites tumefaciens.
