= List of fossiliferous stratigraphic units in Louisiana =

This article contains a list of fossil-bearing stratigraphic units in the state of Louisiana, U.S.

== Sites ==
Group or Formation	Period	Notes
Citronelle Formation	Neogene	
Claiborne Group / Cane River Formation (Cook Mountain Formation or St. Maurice Formation)	Paleogene	
Claiborne Group / Lisbon Formation	Paleogene	
Cockfield Formation	Paleogene	
Danville Landing Formation	Paleogene	
Fleming Formation	Neogene	
Jackson Group / Moodys Branch Formation	Paleogene	
Jackson Group / Yazoo Clay	Paleogene	
Michoud Formation		
Midway Group / Logansport Formation	Paleogene	
Moodys Branch Formation	Paleogene	
New Orleans Barrier Trend		
Pine Island Shale	Cretaceous	
Vicksburg Group / Byram Marl	Paleogene	
Vicksburg Group / Mosley Hill Formation	Paleogene	
Weches Formation	Paleogene	
Wilcox Group	Paleogene	

== See also ==
- Paleontology in Louisiana
