= List of fossiliferous stratigraphic units in Mississippi =

This article contains a list of fossil-bearing stratigraphic units in the state of Mississippi, U.S.

== Sites ==
| Group or Formation | Period | Notes |
|---|---|---|
| Bashi Formation | Paleogene | |
| Byram Formation | Paleogene | |
| Byram Marl | Paleogene | |
| Chickasawhay Formation | Paleogene | |
| Chiwapa Formation | Cretaceous | |
| Claiborne Group/Lisbon Formation | Paleogene | |
| Claiborne Group/Winona Formation | Paleogene | |
| Cockfield Formation | Paleogene | |
| Coffee Sand | Cretaceous | |
| Cook Mountain Formation | Paleogene | |
| Eutaw Formation | Cretaceous | |
| Eutaw Group/McShan Group | Cretaceous | |
| Forest Hill Formation | Paleogene | |
| Glendon Formation | Paleogene | |
| Glendon Limestone | Paleogene | |
| Jackson Formation | Paleogene | |
| Jackson Group/Moodys Branch Formation | Paleogene | |
| Jackson Group/Yazoo Clay | Paleogene | |
| Kosciusko Formation | Paleogene | |
| Marianna Limestone | Paleogene | |
| Midway Group/Clayton Formation | Paleogene | |
| Mint Springs Marl | Paleogene | |
| Moodys Branch Formation | Paleogene | |
| Owl Creek Formation | Cretaceous | |
| Pensacola Formation | Neogene | |
| Prairie Bluff | Cretaceous | |
| Prairie Bluff Chalk | Cretaceous | |
| Red Bluff Clay | Paleogene | |
| Ripley Formation | Cretaceous | |
| Selma Group | Cretaceous | |
| Tallahatta Formation | Paleogene | |
| Tuscahoma Formation | Paleogene | |
| Vicksburg Group/Byram Formation | Paleogene | |
| Vicksburg Group/Marianna Formation | Paleogene | |
| Vicksburg Group/Mint Springs Formation | Paleogene | |
| Vicksburg Group/Red Bluff Formation | Paleogene | |
| Wautubbee Formation | Paleogene | |
| Wilcox Group/Hatchetigbee Bluff Formation | Paleogene | |
| Yazoo Clay | Paleogene | |

== See also ==
- Paleontology in Mississippi
