= St. Maurice Formation =

Geologic formation in Louisiana, United States

St. Maurice Formation (beds)
- Stratigraphic range: Paleogene
- Type: Formation
- Unit of: Claiborne Group

Location
- Region: Louisiana
- Country: United States

Type section
- Named by: Harris (1910)

The St. Maurice Formation is an obsolete stratigraphic term for the Cane River Formation, which is the lowermost marine geologic formation within the Claiborne Group. In 1910, Harris proposed the term St. Maurice for all Claiborne strata, now known as the Claiborne Group, underlying the Cockfield Formation. As proposed, it was synonymous with the lowermost marine strata within the Claiborne Group. In 1926, Spooner subdivided the Claiborne Group underlying the Cockfield Formation, in descending order, into the (1) St. Maurice beds, (2) Sparta sand, and (3) Cane River beds. Afterwards in 1931, Moody proposed the same subdivisions as established by Spooner but substituted the term Cook Mountain, which had stratigraphic priority, for the term St. Maurice and raised each subdivision to the rank of a formation. Later, the term Cook Mountain was replaced by the term Cane River by Huner and the name Cane River Formation for this geologic unit was officially adopted the Louisiana Geological Survey and the United States Geological Survey. The Cane River Formation, formerly known as the St. Maurice Formation or St. Maurice beds, contains fossils dating back to the Paleogene period.

== See also ==
- List of fossiliferous stratigraphic units in Louisiana
- Paleontology in Louisiana
