= Winona Formation =

Geologic formation in Mississippi, United States

- Stratigraphic range: Paleogene
- Type: Formation
- Unit of: Claiborne Group
- Underlies: Sparta Formation
- Overlies: Tallahatta Formation

Lithology
- Primary: sand glauconite
- Other: ironstone

Location
- Region: Mississippi
- Country: United States

Type section
- Named for: Winona, Mississippi

The Winona Formation (also called the Winona Sand or the Winona Greensand) is a sand geologic formation in Mississippi. It preserves fossils dating back to the Paleogene period.

== Description ==
The Winona Formation was originally described as a member of the Tallahatta Formation or as a member of the Lisbon Formation, both of which are members of the Claiborne Group. It was upgraded to formation status and is considered a separate formation from both by the Mississippi Dept. of Environmental Quality Office of Geology. The Winona formation is a medium to fine grain poorly sorted sand that contains silt, clay, and fossils. It has a high glauconite content, up to 50% in some areas. Fossils, molds, and casts are commonly found in lithified beds, and the fossil assemblage includes bivalves, gastropods, echinoids, shark teeth, crabs, foraminifera, and ostracods. The depositional environment for this formation is considered a shallow-water, near shore marine shelf facies as part of a marine transgression series.

== See also ==
- List of fossiliferous stratigraphic units in Mississippi
- Paleontology in Mississippi
