= Holocentrites =

Holocentrites Temporal range: Priabonian to Rupelian

Scientific classification
- Kingdom: Animalia
- Phylum: Chordata
- Class: Actinopterygii
- Division: Teleostei
- Order: Beryciformes
- Family: Holocentridae
- Subfamily: Myripristinae
- Genus: †Holocentrites; Conrad, 1941
- Species: †H. ovalis

Binomial name
- †Holocentrites ovalis Conrad, 1941

Extinct genus of fishes

Holocentrites is an extinct genus of prehistoric soldierfish known from the Late Eocene and Early Oligocene of the southeastern United States. It is the oldest known soldierfish in the fossil record, and inhabited the Atlantic Ocean off the southern United States, in contrast to modern soldierfish which are restricted to the Indo-Pacific.

It contains a single known species, H. ovalis, known from the Late Eocene-aged Ocala Limestone of Florida, the Early Oligocene-aged Marianna Limestone of Florida & Alabama, and the Early Oligocene-aged Glendon Limestone of Mississippi. The type specimen was an articulated partial skeleton found in the Ocala Limestone of what is now Florida Caverns State Park.

== See also ==
- Prehistoric fish
- List of prehistoric bony fish
