= Grotea =

Grotea may refer to:

- Grotea (wasp), a genus of wasps in the family Ichneumonidae
- Grotea, a genus of butterflies in the family Sesiidae; synonym of Podosesia
- Grotea, a genus of reptiles in the family Colubridae; synonym of ?
- Grotea, a genus of butterflies in the family Erebidae; synonym of Sebastia
- Grotea (plant), see 2013 in paleobotany
