= Vicksburg Group =

- Stratigraphic range: Rupelian
- Type: Group
- Sub-units: Bumpnose Limestone, Red Bluff Clay, Forest Hill Sand, Marianna limestone, Glendon Limestone, Byram Formation, and Bucatunna Clay
- Underlies: Citronelle Formation
- Overlies: Jackson group

Location
- Country: United States

Type section
- Named for: Vicksburg

The Vicksburg Group is a geologic group in Georgia, Mississippi, North Florida, and Louisiana. It preserves fossils dating back to the Oligocene epoch. The Suwannee Limestone is the equivalent in peninsular Florida.

== See also ==
- List of fossiliferous stratigraphic units in Georgia (U.S. state)
- Paleontology in Georgia (U.S. state)
