= White Bluff =

White Bluff(s) may refer to several places in the United States:

== Places ==
- White Bluff, Georgia, a former community, now a part of Savannah, Georgia
- White Bluff, Tennessee
- White Bluffs, Washington
- White Bluffs AVA

== Other uses ==
- White Bluff (Demopolis, Alabama), a national historic site
- White Bluff Formation, a geologic formation in Arkansas
- White Bluff Power Plant, a coal-fired power station in Arkansas
