= Danville Landing Formation =

Geologic formation in Louisiana, United States

- Stratigraphic range: Paleogene
- Type: Formation

Location
- Region: Louisiana
- Country: United States

The Danville Landing Formation is a geologic formation in Louisiana. It preserves fossils dating back to the Paleogene period.

== See also ==
- List of fossiliferous stratigraphic units in Louisiana
- Paleontology in Louisiana
