= Chiwapa Formation =

Geologic formation in Mississippi, U.S.

- Stratigraphic range: Cretaceous
- Type: Formation

Location
- Region: Mississippi
- Country: United States

The Chiwapa Formation is a geologic formation in Mississippi. It preserves fossils dating back to the Cretaceous period.

== See also ==
- List of fossiliferous stratigraphic units in Mississippi
- Paleontology in Mississippi
