= Forest Hill Formation =

Geologic formation in Mississippi, United States

- Stratigraphic range: Oligocene
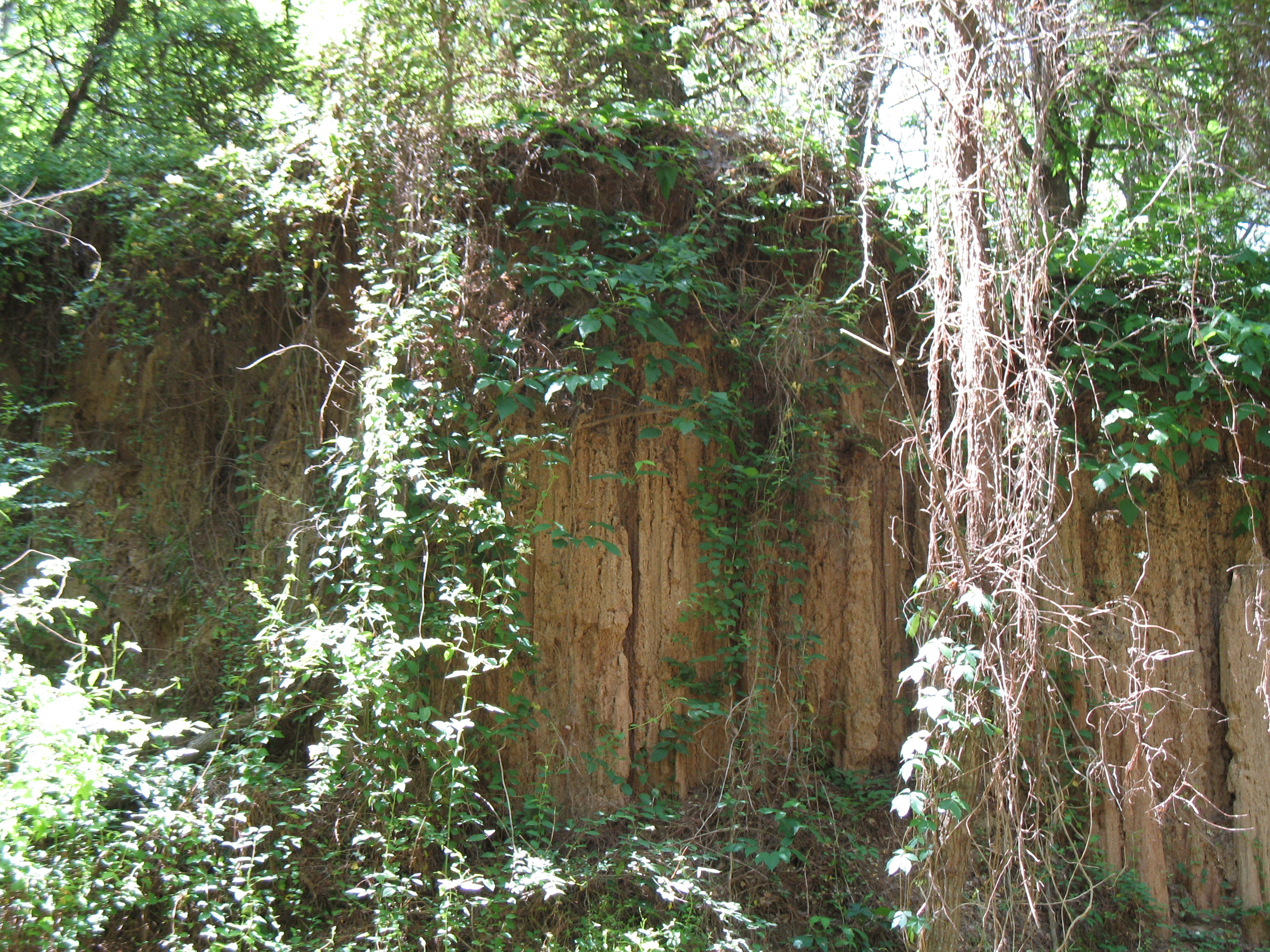
- The Forest Hill formation at the Mississippi Petrified Forest
- Type: Formation

Location
- Region: Mississippi
- Country: United States

The Forest Hill Formation is a geologic formation in Mississippi. It preserves fossils dating back to the Oligocene period, most notably a petrified forest, the Mississippi Petrified Forest. It is composed of loess, fine sand and clay, and some lignite coal.

== See also ==
- List of fossiliferous stratigraphic units in Mississippi
- Paleontology in Mississippi
