= Chickasawhay Formation =

Geologic formation in Mississippi, US

- Stratigraphic range: Paleogene
- Type: Formation

Location
- Region: Mississippi
- Country: United States

The Chickasawhay Formation is a geologic formation in Mississippi. It preserves fossils dating back to the Paleogene period.

== See also ==
- List of fossiliferous stratigraphic units in Mississippi
- Paleontology in Mississippi
