= Pine Island Shale =

Geologic formation in Louisiana, United States

- Stratigraphic range: Aptian; ~120–112 Ma
- Type: Formation

Location
- Region: Louisiana
- Country: United States

The Pine Island Shale is a geologic formation in Louisiana. It preserves fossils dating back to the Cretaceous period.

== See also ==
- List of fossiliferous stratigraphic units in Louisiana
- Paleontology in Louisiana
