= Yazoo Clay =

Geologic formation in the United States

- Stratigraphic range: Late Eocene
- Type: Formation
- Unit of: Jackson Group
- Sub-units: North Twistwood Creek Member, Cocoa Sand Member, Pachuta Marl Member, and Shubuta Member
- Underlies: Crystal River Formation
- Overlies: Moodys Branch Formation

Lithology
- Primary: clay
- Other: sand, marl

Location
- Region: Alabama, Louisiana, Mississippi
- Country: United States

Type section
- Named for: Yazoo River

The Yazoo Clay is a late Eocene clay geologic formation in Alabama, Louisiana, and Mississippi. It was named after a bluff along the Yazoo River at Yazoo City, Mississippi. It contains is a type of clay known as montmorillonite, making it a poor foundation material due to the fact that moisture causes extreme changes in volume. Sand, pyrite, and marl have all been noted in the formation. It preserves fossils including the prehistoric cetaceans Basilosaurus and Zygorhiza, and the marine snake Pterosphenus. Sharks, rays, eels, and fish have also been found from the formation.

== See also ==
- List of fossiliferous stratigraphic units in Alabama
- List of fossiliferous stratigraphic units in Mississippi
- Paleontology in Alabama
- Paleontology in Mississippi
