= Wautubbee Formation =

Geologic formation in Mississippi

- Stratigraphic range: Paleogene
- Type: Formation

Location
- Region: Mississippi
- Country: United States

The Wautubbee Formation is a geologic formation in Mississippi, United States. It preserves fossils dating back to the Paleogene period.

The formation is named after Wautubbee, Mississippi.

== See also ==
- List of fossiliferous stratigraphic units in Mississippi
- Paleontology in Mississippi
