= Tallahatta Formation =

Geologic formation in the Southeastern United States

- Stratigraphic range: Paleogene
- Type: Formation
- Unit of: Claiborne Group
- Sub-units: Basic City Shale (or Clay) Member, Holly Springs Sand Member, Meridian Sand Member, Neshoba Sand Member
- Underlies: Winona Formation
- Overlies: Carrizo Formation

Lithology
- Primary: shale, sand

Location
- Region: Alabama, Florida, Georgia, Mississippi, and subsurface Kentucky
- Country: United States

Type section
- Named for: Tallahatta Hills, Alabama

The Tallahatta Formation is a geologic formation found on the surface in Alabama, Florida, Georgia, and Mississippi. It is also located in the subsurface of Kentucky. The Tallahatta formation is part of the Claiborne Group and contains four members: the Basic City Shale in Mississippi, the Holy Springs Sand Member in Mississippi, the Meridian Sand Member in Alabama and Mississippi, and the Neshoba Sand Member in Mississippi. It preserves fossils dating back to the Paleogene period, specifically the Eocene.

== History ==
As early as 1823, the rocks that would later become the Tallahatta Formation was referred to as "Buhrstone", a type of porous limestone. Other terms used to describe this rock were "Siliceous Claiborne" in Mississippi and the "Choctaw buhrstone" in Alabama. These rocks became known as the Tallahatta Formation in 1898, in honor of the Tallahatta Hills in Choctaw County, Alabama. Originally, the Winona Formation was considered part of the Tallahatta as the Winona Sand Member before it was split off as a separate formation. No submembers exist in Georgia or Florida for this formation. In South Carolina, the basal member of the Claiborne Group is called the Conagree Formation, which correlates to the Tallahatta Formation. It has been proposed that the Tallahatta Formation in Georgia be renamed the Conagree Formation.

== Members ==
=== Basic City Shale ===
The Basic City Shale Member gets its name from Basic, Mississippi. It is also called the Basic Claystone or Basic Clay Member. It is a siliceous shale interlaminated with beds of sandstone and siltstone. It is described as "sparingly fossiliferous" and contains signs of bioturbation. It was deposited in a near-shore, quiet marine environment. It overlays the Meridian Sand Member.

=== Holly Springs Sand Member ===
The Holly Springs Sand Member takes its name from Holly Springs, Mississippi. It was originally considered a member of the Wilcox Formation in Mississippi and is dominated by coarse grained, cross bedded sand. The name was abandoned, upgraded to a formation, and added as a member of the Tallahatta Formation. It is still considered a separate formation in Missouri as part of the Wilcox Group.

=== Meridian Sand Member ===
The Meridian Sand Member was named for Meridian, Mississippi and is a very coarse to medium, nonfossiliferous sand. It was also called the Meridian Formation, the Meridian Sand, or the Meridian Buhrstone, and is not always grouped as part of the Tallahatta Formation and some earlier works considered it part of the Wilcox Group. It is the oldest member of the Tallahatta Formation and is thought to represent a fluvial deposition.

=== Neshoba Sand Member ===
The Neshoba Sand Member was named for Neshoba Co., Mississippi and is a non-fossiliferous sand. It was considered part of the Winona Formation, but was separated out due to its low glauconite concentration and the presence of an unconformity. The sand grains grow steadily coarser from top to bottom, and is thought to represent a marine regression depositional environment.

== See also ==
- List of fossiliferous stratigraphic units in Georgia (U.S. state)
- List of fossiliferous stratigraphic units in Mississippi
- Paleontology in Georgia (U.S. state)
