= Kosciusko Formation =

Geologic formation in Mississippi

- Stratigraphic range: Paleogene
- Type: Formation

Location
- Region: Mississippi
- Country: United States

The Kosciusko Formation is a geologic formation in Mississippi. It preserves fossils dating back to the Paleogene period (the first period of the Cenozoic Era).

== See also ==
- List of fossiliferous stratigraphic units in Mississippi
- Paleontology in Mississippi
