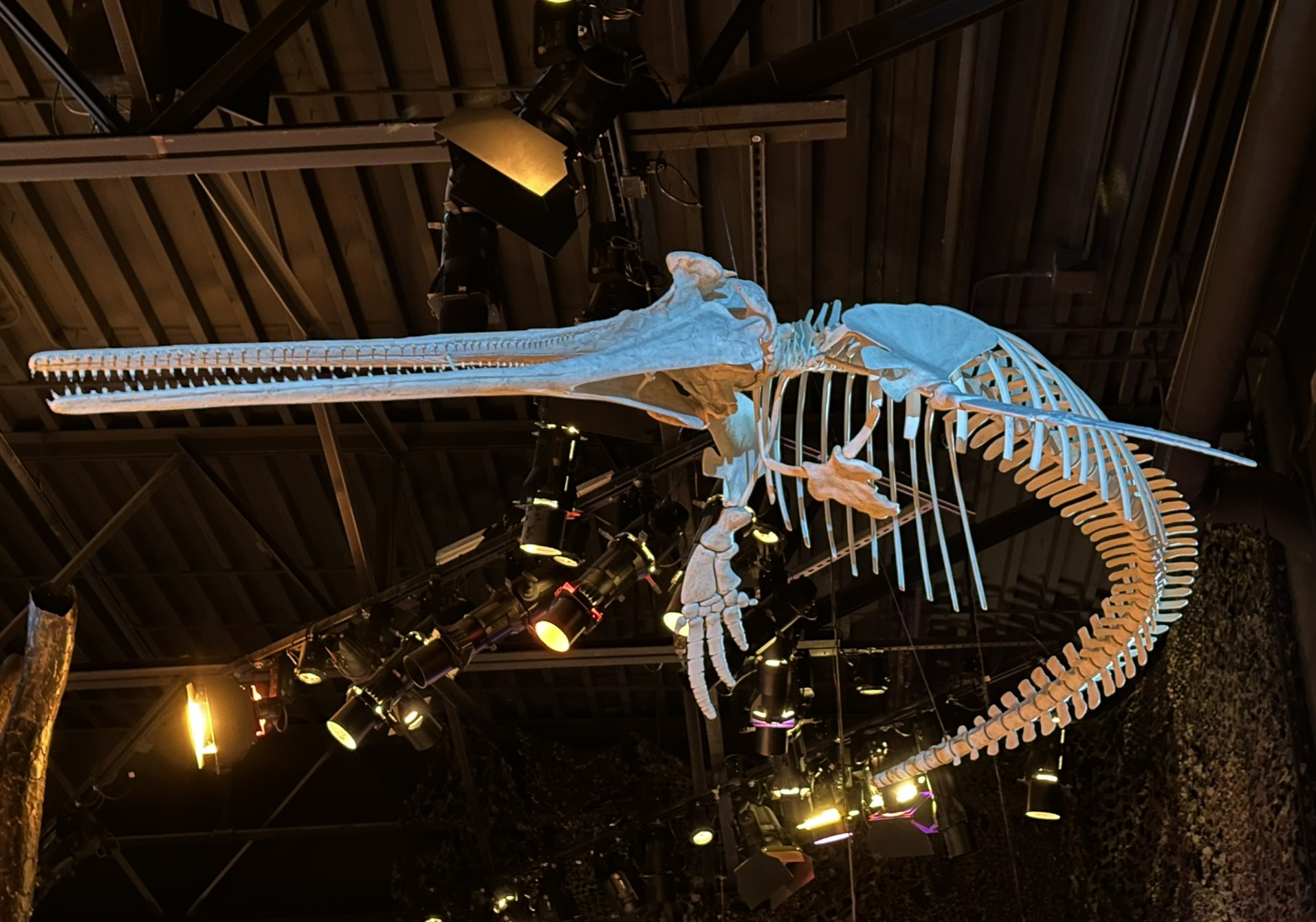
- Reconstructed P. inaequalis skeleton, Florida Museum of Natural History

Scientific classification
- Kingdom: Animalia
- Phylum: Chordata
- Class: Mammalia
- Infraclass: Placentalia
- Order: Artiodactyla
- Infraorder: Cetacea
- Family: Platanistidae
- Subfamily: †Pomatodelphininae
- Genus: †Pomatodelphis; Allen, 1921

Type species
- †Pomatodelphis inaequalis Allen, 1921

Species
- P. bobengi; P. inaequalis; P. stenorhynchus

= Pomatodelphis =

Pomatodelphis Temporal range: Middle Miocene ~15.97–7.25 Ma

Extinct genus of dolphins

Pomatodelphis is an extinct genus of river dolphin from Middle Miocene marine deposits in Alabama, Maryland, Florida, Brazil, Germany, and France.

== Etymology ==
Pomatodelphis may be a typo for potamodelphis ("river dolphin") from potamo-, "river", and δελφίς, delphis "dolphin".

== Classification ==
Pomatodelphis belongs to the platanistid subfamily Pomatodelphininae, which is distinguished from the South Asian river dolphin in having a flattened rostrum, a transversely expanded posterior end of the premaxilla, an eye and bony orbit of normal size (not atrophied), and nasal bones not reduced in size but wide transversely. A close relative of Pomatodelphis is Prepomatodelphis from marine deposits in Austria. Three species are known, P. inaequalis, P. bobengi, and P. stenorhynchus.

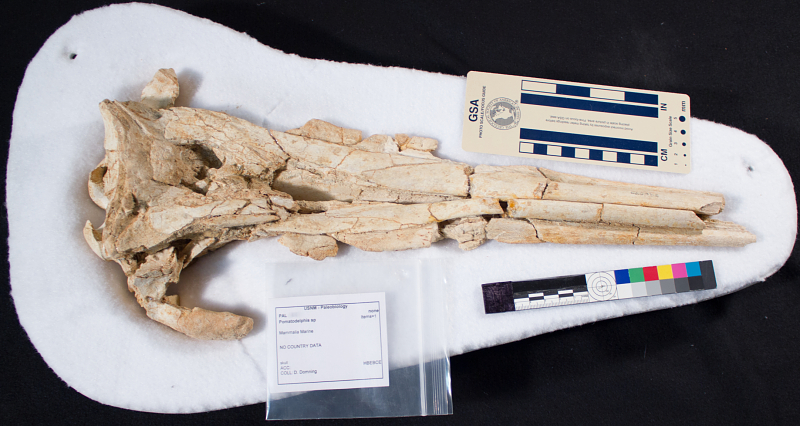
Fossil skull of P. bobengi

== Fossil distribution ==
Fossils of Pomatodelphis have been found in:

- Citronelle Formation (Hemphillian), Alabama
- Solimões Formation (Huayquerian), Brazil
- Marks Head, Peace River and Statenhead Formations, Florida
- France
- Germany
