= Wautubbee, Mississippi =

- Unincorporated community
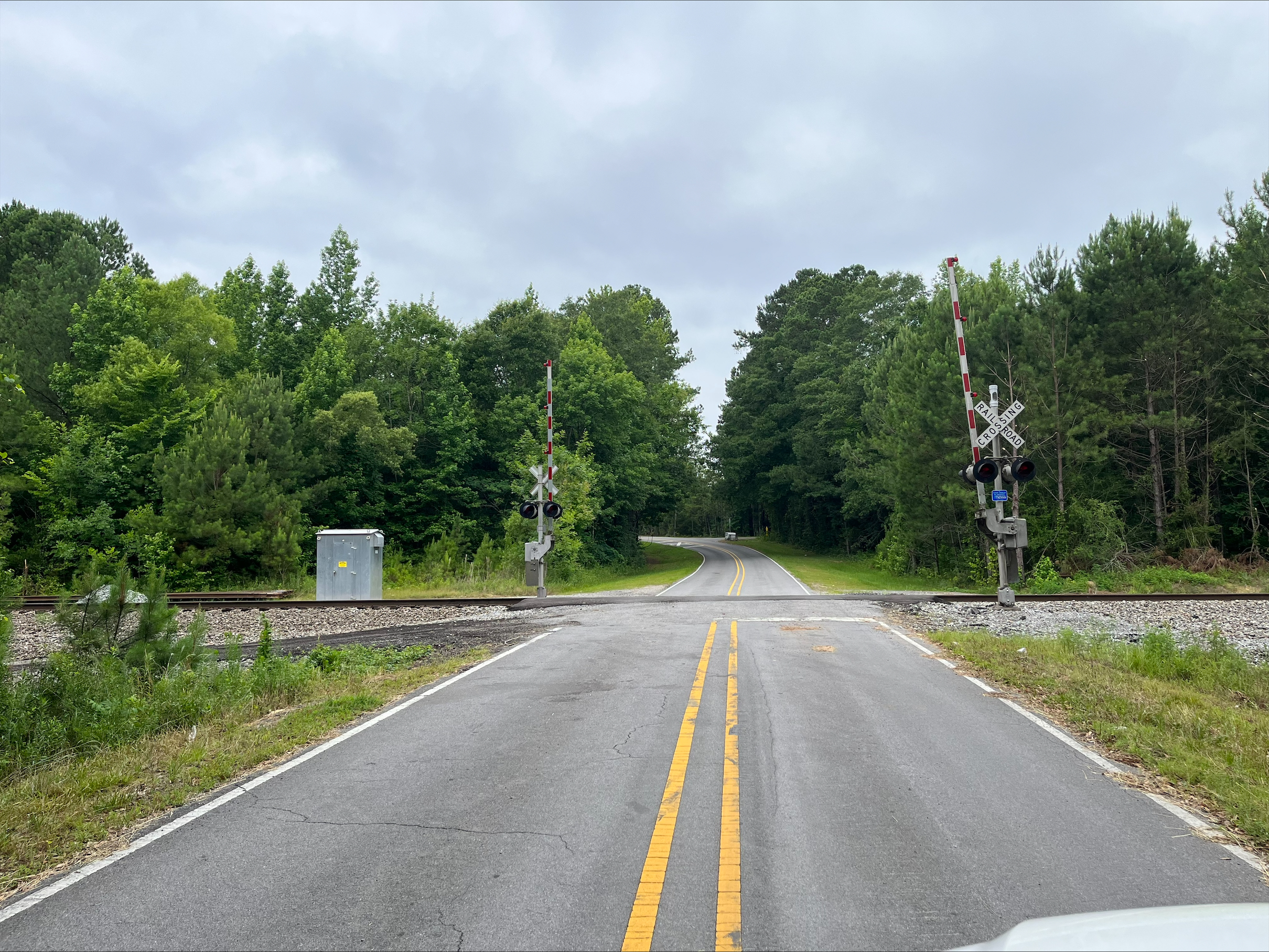
- Norfolk Southern Railway crossing in Wautubbee

- Location within Mississippi Location within the United States
- Coordinates: 32°06′59″N 88°51′30″W
- Country: United States
- State: Mississippi
- County: Clarke
- Elevation: 377 ft (115 m)
- Time zone: UTC-6 (Central (CST))
  - Summer (DST): UTC-5 (CDT)
- Area codes: 601 & 769
- GNIS feature ID: 692311

Wautubbee is an unincorporated community in Clarke County, Mississippi, United States.

== History ==
Wautubbee was founded in 1882. Wautubbee is a name derived from the Choctaw language purported to mean "the one who hunts and kills". A variant name was "Hells Valley". Wautubbee is located on the former New Orleans and Northeastern Railroad.

A post office operated under the name Wautubbee from 1893 to 1906.

The Ruby Lumber Company and Pine Hill Lumber Company were based in Wautubbee and both operated sawmills there.

The Wautubbee Formation is named for Wautubbee.
