= 2013 in paleobotany =

This list of 2013 in paleobotany records new fossil plant taxa that were described during 2013, as well as other significant discoveries and events related to paleobotany that occurred in the year.

== Chlorophyta ==
Name	Novelty	Status	Authors	Age	Unit	Location	Notes	Images
Cymatiosphaera scitula	Sp. nov.	Valid	Wicander & Playford	Devonian (Famennian)	Saverton Shale	United States	A member of Chlorophyta belonging to the group Prasinophyceae.	

== Bryophyta ==
Name	Novelty	Status	Authors	Age	Unit	Location	Notes	Images
Brachytheciites sachalinensis	Sp. nov	Valid	Ignatov & Perkovsky	Middle Eocene	Sakhalinian amber	Russia	A moss belonging to the family Brachytheciaceae.	
Bryiidites	Gen. et sp. nov.	Valid	Barclay et al.	Late Cretaceous (late Cenomanian)	Middle Dakota Formation	United States	A member of Bryidae of uncertain phylogenetic placement. The type specimen is Bryiidites utahensis.	
Bryokhutuliinia crassimarginata	Sp. nov	Valid	Ignatov et al.	Late Jurassic		Russia	A moss.	
Calymperites	Gen. et sp. nov	Valid	Ignatov & Perkovsky	Late Eocene	Rovno amber	Ukraine	A moss belonging to the group Dicranales (sensu lato). Genus includes new species C. ucrainicus.	
Pseudoleskeellites	Gen. et sp. nov	Valid	Ignatov & Perkovsky	Middle Eocene	Sakhalinian amber	Russia	A moss belonging to the order Hypnales. Genus includes new species P. obscurus.	

== Ferns and fern allies ==
Name	Novelty	Status	Authors	Age	Unit	Location	Notes	Images
Ashicaulis beipiaoensis	Sp. nov	Valid	Tian et al.	Middle Jurassic	Tiaojishan Formation	China	A member of Osmundaceae. Originally described as a species of Ashicaulis; transferred to the genus Millerocaulis by Bomfleur, Grimm & McLoughlin (2017).	
Mygdykitia	Gen. et sp. nov	Valid	Golovneva & Shczepetov	Late Cretaceous (Campanian)	Ola Formation	Russia	A fern belonging to the family Dipteridaceae. Genus includes new species M. ochotica.	
Palaeosorum	Gen. et sp. nov	Valid	Jacques & Zhou in Jacques, Su & Zhou	Miocene	Dajie Formation	China	A member of Polypodiaceae. The type specimen is Palaeosorum ellipticum.	
Todea amissa	Sp. nov.	Valid	Carvalho in Carvalho et al.	Early Eocene		Argentina	A species of Todea.	
Yavanna	Gen. et sp. nov	Valid	Vera	Early Cretaceous (Aptian)	Cerro Negro Formation	Antarctica (Livingston Island)	A cyathealean of uncertain placement. Type species is Y. chimaerica.	

== Ginkgophytes ==
Name	Novelty	Status	Authors	Age	Unit	Location	Notes	Images
Allicospermum angrenicum	Sp. nov.	Valid	Nosova	Middle Jurassic	Angren Formation	Uzbekistan	A Ginkgo-like plant described on the basis of seeds.	
Nagrenia	Gen. et sp. nov.	Valid	Nosova	Middle Jurassic	Angren Formation	Uzbekistan	A member of Ginkgoales described on the basis of peduncles furcating into several pedicels. Genus includes new species N. samylinae.	

== Gnetophyta ==
Name	Novelty	Status	Authors	Age	Unit	Location	Notes	Images
Chengia	Gen. et sp. nov.	Valid	Yang, Lin & Wang	Early Cretaceous (Aptian)	Yixian Formation	China	A member of Ephedraceae. The type specimen is Chengia laxispicata.	
Friedsellowia gracilifolia	Gen. nov. et sp. nov.	Valid	Löwe et al.	Early Cretaceous	Crato Formation	Brazil	A gnetophyte. The type of a new genus.	
Itajuba	Gen. et sp. nov	Valid	Ricardi-Branco et al.	Early Cretaceous (Aptian or Albian)	Crato Member of the Santana Formation	Brazil	A member of Gnetales. The type specimen is Itajuba yansanae.	

== Pachytestopsida ==
Name	Novelty	Status	Authors	Age	Unit	Location	Notes	Images
Stephanospermum braidwoodensis	Sp. nov.	Valid	Spencer, Hilton & Sutton	Carboniferous	Mazon Creek fossil beds	United States	A member of Medullosales, a species of Stephanospermum.	
Stephanospermum shuichengensis	Sp. nov.	Valid	Spencer et al.	Permian (Lopingian)	Wangjiazhai Formation	China	A member of Medullosales, a species of Stephanospermum.	

== Pinophyta ==
Name	Novelty	Status	Authors	Age	Unit	Location	Notes	Images
Bancroftiastrobus	Gen. et sp. nov.	Valid	Rothwell et al.	Late Jurassic (early Kimmeridgian)	Kimmeridge Clay Formation	United Kingdom	A pinophyte of uncertain phylogenetic placement. Type species is B. digitata.	
Brachyoxylon currumilii	Sp. nov.	Valid	Bodnar et al.	Early–Middle Jurassic	Cañadón Asfalto Formation	Argentina	A member of Pinophyta described on the basis of fossil wood.	
Cunninghamia taylorii	Sp. nov.	Valid	Serbet, Bomfleur & Rothwell	Late Cretaceous (Campanian)	Horseshoe Canyon Formation	Canada	A species of Cunninghamia.	
Elatocladus anorovii	Sp. nov	Valid	Golovneva & Shczepetov	Late Cretaceous (Campanian)	Ola Formation	Russia	A conifer of uncertain phylogenetic placement.	
Pagiophyllum heshanense	Sp. nov.	Valid	Liu & Yao	Permian		China	A species of Pagiophyllum.	
Pararaucaria delfueyoi	Sp. nov.	Valid	Escapa et al.	Late Jurassic	Cañadón Calcáreo Formation	Argentina	A member of Pinophyta belonging to the family Cheirolepidiaceae, a species of Pararaucaria.	
Picea yanensis	Sp. nov	Valid	Golovneva & Shczepetov	Late Cretaceous (Campanian)	Ola Formation	Russia	A spruce.	
Prumnopitys anglica	Sp. nov.	Valid	Greenwood, Hill & Conran	Eocene	Branksome Formation	United Kingdom	A species of Prumnopitys.	
Schizolepidopsis canicularis	Sp. nov.	Valid	Leslie et al.	Early Cretaceous (probably Aptian-Albian)	Tevshiin Govi Formation	Mongolia	A member of Pinophyta, possibly a member of the stem group of Pinaceae; a species of Schizolepidopsis.	
Xuanweioxylon	Gen. et sp. nov.	Valid	He et al.	Permian (late Wuchiapingian-Changhsingian)	Xuanwei Formation	China	A member of Pinophyta. Genus includes new species X. scalariforme.	

== Angiosperms ==
Name	Novelty	Status	Authors	Age	Unit	Location	Notes	Images
Anonaspermum warmanensis	Sp. nov.	Valid	Wang, Blanchard & Dilcher	Eocene	Cockfield Formation	United States	A member of Annonaceae.	
Atli	Gen. et sp. nov.	Valid	Smith et al.	Late Cretaceous (Campanian)		Canada	A ranunculalean known from a stem with lianoid anatomy. The type specimen is Atli morinii.	
Bambusiculmus	Gen. et 2 sp. nov.	Valid	Wang & Zhou in Wang et al.	Miocene	Dajie Formation	China	A bamboo. The type specimen is Bambusiculmus angustus; genus also includes Bambusiculmus latus.	
Bambusium angustifolia	Sp. nov.	Valid	Wang & Zhou in Wang et al.	Miocene	Dajie Formation	China	A bamboo, a species of Bambusium.	
Bambusium latifolia	Sp. nov.	Valid	Wang & Zhou in Wang et al.	Miocene	Dajie Formation	China	A bamboo, a species of Bambusium.	
Bombacacioxylon	Gen. et sp. nov.	Valid	Mehrotra et al.	Late Miocene to early Pliocene	Tipam Group	India	A possible relative of Bombax. The type specimen is Bombacacioxylon tertiarum.	
Carpolithus warmanensis	Sp. nov.	Valid	Wang, Blanchard & Dilcher	Eocene	Cockfield Formation	United States	A fossil fruit.	
Cornerocarpon	Gen. et sp. nov.	Valid	Grote in Wang, Blanchard & Dilcher	Eocene	Cockfield Formation	United States	A member of Rosales belonging or related to the family Moraceae. Genus includes new species C. copiosum.	
Corylopsis grotei	Sp. nov.	Valid	Wang, Blanchard & Dilcher	Eocene	Cockfield Formation	United States	A species of Corylopsis.	
Diospyros neyveliensis	Sp. nov.	Valid	Mukherjee & Prasad	Miocene	Neyveli Formation	India	A member of the family Ebenaceae described on the basis of fossil wood. Originally described as a species of Diospyros; Srivastava et al. (2018) transferred this species to the genus Ebenoxylon.	
Firmiana oligocenica	Sp. nov.	Valid	Srivastava & Mehrotra	Oligocene (Chattian)	Tikak Parbat Formation	India	A species of Firmiana.	
Grotea	Gen. et sp. nov.	Valid	Wang, Blanchard & Dilcher	Eocene	Cockfield Formation	United States	A member of the family Bignoniaceae. Genus includes new species G. warmanensis.	
Guadua morronei	Sp. nov.	Valid	Brea, Zucol & Franco	Pliocene–Pleistocene	Ituzaingó Formation	Argentina	A bamboo, a species of Guadua.	
Hamamelis warmanensis	Sp. nov.	Valid	Wang, Blanchard & Dilcher	Eocene	Cockfield Formation	United States	A witch-hazel.	
Indovitis	Gen. et sp. nov.	Valid	Manchester, Kapgate & Wen	Late Cretaceous (Maastrichtian)	Deccan Intertrappean Beds	India	A member of the family Vitaceae. Genus includes new species I. chitaleyae.	
Iterophyllum	Gen. et sp. nov.	Valid	Barral et al.	Early Cretaceous (late Barremian)		Spain	A basal eudicot. The type specimen is Iterophyllum lobatum.	
Jaguariba wiersemana	Gen. nov. et sp. nov.	Valid	Coiffard, Mohr & Bernardes-de-Oliveira	Early Cretaceous	Crato Formation	Brazil	Fossil Nymphaeales.	
Lagerstroemia corvinusii	Sp. nov.	Valid	Prasad	Mio-Pliocene	Churia Formation	Nepal	A species of Lagerstroemia.	
Laurelia otagoensis	Sp. nov	Valid	Conran, Bannister & Lee	Early Miocene		New Zealand	A species of Laurelia.	
Lauroflorum	Gen. et sp. nov.	Valid	Wang, Blanchard & Dilcher	Eocene	Cockfield Formation	United States	A member of Lauraceae. Genus includes new species L. warmanensis.	
Lindera acuminatissima	Sp. nov	Valid	Dao & Sun in Dao et al.	Late Pliocene	Mangbang Formation	China	A species of Lindera.	
"Magnolia" szakmanycsabae	Sp. nov.	Valid	Hably	Late Miocene		Hungary	A plant of uncertain phylogenetic placement, possibly a relative of Magnoliaceae–Lauraceae.	
Micropetasos	Gen. et sp. nov	Valid	Poinar, Chambers & Wunderlich	Late Cretaceous (Cenomanian)	Burmese amber	Myanmar	An early flowering plant of uncertain phylogenetic placement. Genus includes new species M. burmensis.	
Myrtineoxylon	Gen. et sp. nov.	Valid	Oskolski, Feng & Jin	Late Eocene	Youganwo Formation	China	A member of Myrtaceae described on the basis of fossil wood. Genus includes new species M. maomingensis.	
Palmoxylon vastanensis	Sp. nov.	Valid	Prasad et al.	Eocene	Cambay Shale Formation	India	A palm tree, a species of Palmoxylon.	
Paranephelium makumensis	Sp. nov.	Valid	Srivastava & Mehrotra	Oligocene (Chattian)	Tikak Parbat Formation	India	A species of Paranephelium.	
Poeciloneuron preindicum	Sp. nov.	Valid	Srivastava & Mehrotra	Late Oligocene		India	A species of Poeciloneuron.	
Pongamia arjunkholaensis	Sp. nov.	Valid	Prasad	Mio-Pliocene	Churia Formation	Nepal	A species of Pongamia.	
Potomacapnos	Gen. et sp. nov.	Valid	Jud & Hickey	Early Cretaceous (Aptian)	Potomac Group	United States	A close relative of ranunculalean eudicots. The type specimen is Potomacapnos apeleutheron.	
Pterygota palaeoalata	Sp. nov.	Valid	Srivastava & Mehrotra	Oligocene (Chattian)	Tikak Parbat Formation	India	A species of Pterygota.	
Sapindus palaeoemarginatus	Sp. nov.	Valid	Srivastava & Mehrotra	Oligocene (Chattian)	Tikak Parbat Formation	India	A species of Sapindus.	
Schima nanlinensis	Sp. nov.	Valid	Li et al.	Miocene	Nanlin Formation	China	A species of Schima.	
Spixiarum kipea	Gen. nov. et sp. nov.	Valid	Coiffard, Mohr & Bernardes-de-Oliveira	Early Cretaceous	Crato Formation	Brazil	Fossil Aroid.	
Toddalia nanlinensis	Sp. nov.	Valid	Li et al.	Miocene	Nanlin Formation	China	A species of Toddalia.	
Trapa pannonica	Sp. nov.	Valid	Hably	Late Miocene		Hungary	A water caltrop.	
Trapa rozsaszentmartoni	Sp. nov.	Valid	Hably	Late Miocene		Hungary	A water caltrop.	
Virola dominicana	Sp. nov.	Valid	Poinar & Steeves	Cenozoic (Eocene or Miocene)		Dominican Republic	A member of Myristicaceae found in Dominican amber, a species of Virola.	
Vitis szakmanygyorgyi	Sp. nov.	Valid	Hably	Late Miocene		Hungary	A species of Vitis.	

== Other seed plants ==
Name	Novelty	Status	Authors	Age	Unit	Location	Notes	Images
Donponoxylon	Gen. et 2 sp. nov.	Valid	Tidwell, Britt & Wright	Middle to Late Jurassic		Australia; New Zealand	A seed plant of uncertain phylogenetic placement. The type specimen is Donponoxylon bennettii; genus also contains Donponoxylon jacksonii.	
Dordrechtites arcanus	Sp. nov.	Valid	Bergene, Taylor & Taylor	Middle Triassic (Anisian)	Fremouw Formation	Antarctica	A gymnosperm of uncertain phylogenetic placement.	

== Other plants ==
Name	Novelty	Status	Authors	Age	Unit	Location	Notes	Images
Acinosporites tristratus	Sp. nov	Valid	Breuer & Steemans	Devonian	Jubah Formation	Saudi Arabia	A trilete spore.	
Alatisporites? trisacculus	Sp. nov	Valid	Breuer & Steemans	Devonian	Jauf Formation	Saudi Arabia	A trilete spore.	
Biornatispora elegantula	Sp. nov	Valid	Breuer & Steemans	Devonian	Jauf Formation	Belgium; Germany; Saudi Arabia	A trilete spore.	
Biornatispora microclavata	Sp. nov	Valid	Breuer & Steemans	Devonian	Jauf Formation	Saudi Arabia	A trilete spore.	
Brochotriletes crameri	Sp. nov	Valid	Breuer & Steemans	Devonian	Jauf Formation; Jubah Formation	Saudi Arabia	A trilete spore.	
Brochotriletes tenellus	Sp. nov	Valid	Breuer & Steemans	Devonian	Jauf Formation	Saudi Arabia	A trilete spore.	
Brochotriletes tripapillatus	Sp. nov	Valid	Breuer & Steemans	Devonian	Awaynat Wanin II Formation	Libya	A trilete spore.	
Camarozonotriletes asperulus	Sp. nov	Valid	Breuer & Steemans	Devonian	Awaynat Wanin I Formation; Awaynat Wanin II Formation; Awaynat Wanin III Formation	Brazil; Tunisia	A trilete spore.	
Chelinospora carnosa	Sp. nov	Valid	Breuer & Steemans	Devonian	Jauf Formation	Saudi Arabia	A trilete spore.	
Chelinospora condensata	Sp. nov	Valid	Breuer & Steemans	Devonian	Jauf Formation	Saudi Arabia	A trilete spore.	
Chelinospora densa	Sp. nov	Valid	Breuer & Steemans	Devonian	Jauf Formation	Saudi Arabia	A trilete spore.	
Chelinospora laxa	Sp. nov	Valid	Breuer & Steemans	Devonian	Jauf Formation	Saudi Arabia	A trilete spore.	
Chelinospora vulgata	Sp. nov	Valid	Breuer & Steemans	Devonian	Jauf Formation	Saudi Arabia	A trilete spore.	
Coronaspora inornata	Sp. nov	Valid	Breuer & Steemans	Devonian	Jauf Formation	Saudi Arabia	A trilete spore.	
Cristatisporites streelii	Sp. nov	Valid	Breuer & Steemans	Devonian	Awaynat Wanin II Formation	Brazil; Tunisia	A trilete spore.	
Cymbosporites variabilis	Sp. nov	Valid	Breuer & Steemans	Devonian	Jauf Formation	Saudi Arabia	A trilete spore.	
Cymbosporites variegatus	Sp. nov	Valid	Breuer & Steemans	Devonian	Awaynat Wanin II Formation	Brazil; Libya; Saudi Arabia; Tunisia; United Kingdom	A trilete spore.	
Cymbosporites wellmanii	Sp. nov	Valid	Breuer & Steemans	Devonian	Jauf Formation	Saudi Arabia	A trilete spore.	
Cyrtospora tumida	Sp. nov	Valid	Breuer & Steemans	Devonian	Awaynat Wanin I Formation; Awaynat Wanin II Formation; Awaynat Wanin III Formation	Saudi Arabia; Tunisia	A trilete spore.	
Diaphanospora milleri	Sp. nov	Valid	Breuer & Steemans	Devonian	Jauf Formation; Ouan Kasa Formation	Saudi Arabia	A trilete spore.	
Dibolisporites tuberculatus	Sp. nov	Valid	Breuer & Steemans	Devonian	Awaynat Wanin I Formation; Awaynat Wanin II Formation; Jauf Formation; Jubah Formation	Brazil; Libya; Saudi Arabia; Spain; Tunisia; United States	A trilete spore.	
Dibolisporites verecundus	Sp. nov	Valid	Breuer & Steemans	Devonian	Jauf Formation	Saudi Arabia	A trilete spore.	
Dictyotriletes hemeri	Sp. nov	Valid	Breuer & Steemans	Devonian	Jubah Formation	Saudi Arabia; Spain	A trilete spore.	
Dictyotriletes marshallii	Sp. nov	Valid	Breuer & Steemans	Devonian	Jauf Formation; Ouan Kasa Formation	Saudi Arabia	A trilete spore.	
Elenisporis gondwanensis	Sp. nov	Valid	Breuer & Steemans	Devonian	Awaynat Wanin I Formation; Awaynat Wanin II Formation; Jubah Formation	Saudi Arabia; Tunisia	A trilete spore.	
Emphanisporites laticostatus	Sp. nov	Valid	Breuer & Steemans	Devonian	Awaynat Wanin III Formation; Jubah Formation	Brazil; Saudi Arabia; Tunisia	A trilete spore.	
Emphanisporites plicatus	Sp. nov	Valid	Breuer & Steemans	Devonian	Jauf Formation; Jubah Formation	Saudi Arabia	A trilete spore.	
Franhueberia	Gen. et sp. nov.	Valid	Hoffman & Tomescu	Devonian (Emsian)	Battery Point Formation	Canada	A basal member of Euphyllophytina. The type specimen is F. gerriennei.	
Geminospora convoluta	Sp. nov	Valid	Breuer & Steemans	Devonian	Awaynat Wanin II Formation; Jubah Formation	Saudi Arabia	A trilete spore.	
Grandispora maura	Sp. nov	Valid	Breuer & Steemans	Devonian	Awaynat Wanin I Formation; Awaynat Wanin II Formation; Awaynat Wanin III Formation	Saudi Arabia; Tunisia	A trilete spore.	
Granulatisporites concavus	Sp. nov	Valid	Breuer & Steemans	Devonian	Awaynat Wanin I Formation; Awaynat Wanin II Formation; Jauf Formation; Jubah Formation	Libya; Saudi Arabia; Spain	A trilete spore.	
Hystricosporites brevispinus	Sp. nov	Valid	Breuer & Steemans	Devonian	Awaynat Wanin II Formation	Tunisia	A trilete spore.	
Raistrickia commutata	Sp. nov	Valid	Breuer & Steemans	Devonian	Awaynat Wanin II Formation; Awaynat Wanin III Formation	Saudi Arabia; Tunisia	A trilete spore.	
Raistrickia jaufensis	Sp. nov	Valid	Breuer & Steemans	Devonian	Jauf Formation	Saudi Arabia	A trilete spore.	
Retusotriletes atratus	Sp. nov	Valid	Breuer & Steemans	Devonian	Jauf Formation; Jubah Formation	Australia; Saudi Arabia; Spain	A trilete spore.	
Retusotriletes celatus	Sp. nov	Valid	Breuer & Steemans	Devonian	Jauf Formation	Saudi Arabia	A trilete spore.	
Samarisporites tunisiensis	Sp. nov	Valid	Breuer & Steemans	Devonian	Ouan Kasa Formation	Tunisia	A trilete spore.	
Verrucosisporites nafudensis	Sp. nov	Valid	Breuer & Steemans	Devonian	Jauf Formation	Saudi Arabia	A trilete spore.	
Verrucosisporites onustus	Sp. nov	Valid	Breuer & Steemans	Devonian	Jauf Formation	Saudi Arabia	A trilete spore.	
Verrucosisporites stictus	Sp. nov	Valid	Breuer & Steemans	Devonian	Jauf Formation; Ouan Kasa Formation	Saudi Arabia	A trilete spore.	
Zonotriletes brevivelatus	Sp. nov	Valid	Breuer & Steemans	Devonian	Awaynat Wanin I Formation; Jauf Formation; Jubah Formation; Ouan Kasa Formation	Algeria; Libya; Saudi Arabia; Tunisia	A trilete spore.	
Zonotriletes rotundus	Sp. nov	Valid	Breuer & Steemans	Devonian	Awaynat Wanin I Formation; Awaynat Wanin II Formation; Ouan Kasa Formation	Brazil; Tunisia	A trilete spore.	
Zonotriletes venatus	Sp. nov	Valid	Breuer & Steemans	Devonian	Jauf Formation; Ouan Kasa Formation	Algeria; Brazil; Saudi Arabia; Tunisia	A trilete spore.	
