= Citronelle Formation =

Geologic formation in the southern United States

- Stratigraphic range: Early Pliocene (late Hemphillian); ~5.3–4.9 Ma
- Type: Formation

Lithology
- Primary: sand and gravelly sand
- Other: clay and sandy clay

Location
- Coordinates: 30.8°N 88.1°W
- Approximate paleocoordinates: 31.0°N 86.4°W
- Region: Alabama, Louisiana, Florida, Mississippi
- Country: United States

Type section
- Named for: Citronelle, Alabama
- Named by: G. C. Matson
- Citronelle Formation (the United States) Citronelle Formation (Alabama)

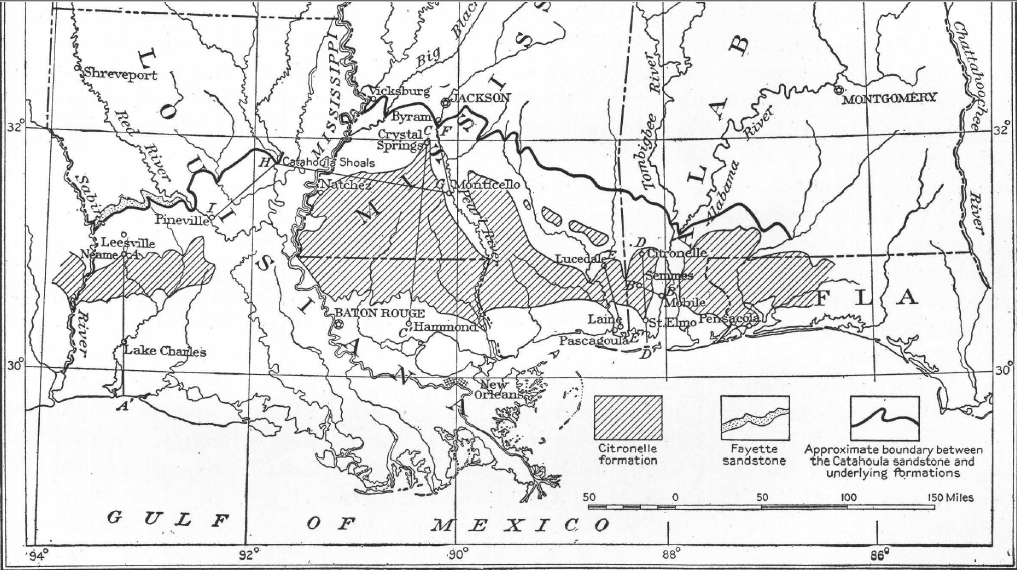
Pliocene Citronelle Formation geological map

The Citronelle Formation is a Hemphillian geologic formation in Alabama, Florida, Mississippi and Louisiana.

== Fossil content ==
It preserves fossils of:

- Nannippus cf. lenticularis
- Neohipparion eurystyle
- Pomatodelphis inaequalis
- Synthetoceras cf. tricornatus
- Anomia taylorensis
- Cassidulus gouldii
- Chlamys chickaria
- Chlamys gainstownensis
- Chlamys glendonensis
- Chlamys mcquirti
- Kuphus incrassatus
- Pecten howei
- Caretta sp.
- Teleoceras sp.
- Trionyx sp.
- Camelidae indet.
- Cervidae indet.
- Scombroidei indet.

== See also ==
- List of fossiliferous stratigraphic units in Alabama
- List of fossiliferous stratigraphic units in Louisiana
- Paleontology in Alabama
- Paleontology in Louisiana
- Alachua Formation
- Chagres Formation
- Goliad Formation
- Rattlesnake Formation
