= Marianna Limestone =

Geologic formation in the southern United States

- Stratigraphic range: Paleogene
- Type: Geologic formation

Lithology
- Primary: Limestone

Location
- Region: Alabama, Florida, Mississippi
- Country: United States

The Marianna Limestone is a limestone geologic formation located in Alabama, northwestern Florida, and Mississippi.

It preserves fossils dating back to the Paleogene period of the early Cenozoic Era.

== See also ==
- List of fossiliferous stratigraphic units in Alabama
- List of fossiliferous stratigraphic units in Florida
- List of fossiliferous stratigraphic units in Mississippi
