= White Bluff Formation =

Geologic formation in Arkansas

- Stratigraphic range: Paleogene
- Type: Formation
- Unit of: Jackson Group
- Sub-units: Pastoria Sand Member, Caney Point Marl Member, Rison Clay Member

Lithology
- Primary: marl, sand, clay

Location
- Region: Arkansas
- Country: United States

Type section
- Named for: White Bluff, along the Arkansas River

The White Bluff Formation is a marl, sand, and clay geologic formation in Arkansas that is part of the Jackson Group. It preserves fossils dating back to the Paleogene period, specifically the Eocene.

== Description ==
The White Bluff Formation is composed of three members: the Pastoria Sand Member, the Caney Point Marl Member, and the Rison Clay Member. The Pastoria Sand is a clayey sand containing glauconite and mollusca fossils. The Caney Point Marl is a chalky clay with glauconite and various invertebrate fossils. The Rison Clay is a clay with interbedded silts containing foraminifera fossils and scattered mollusca molds. The entire formation was deposited as a marine sequence.

== See also ==
- List of fossiliferous stratigraphic units in Arkansas
- Paleontology in Arkansas
