= Mississippi Petrified Forest =

Petrified forest in Mississippi, United States

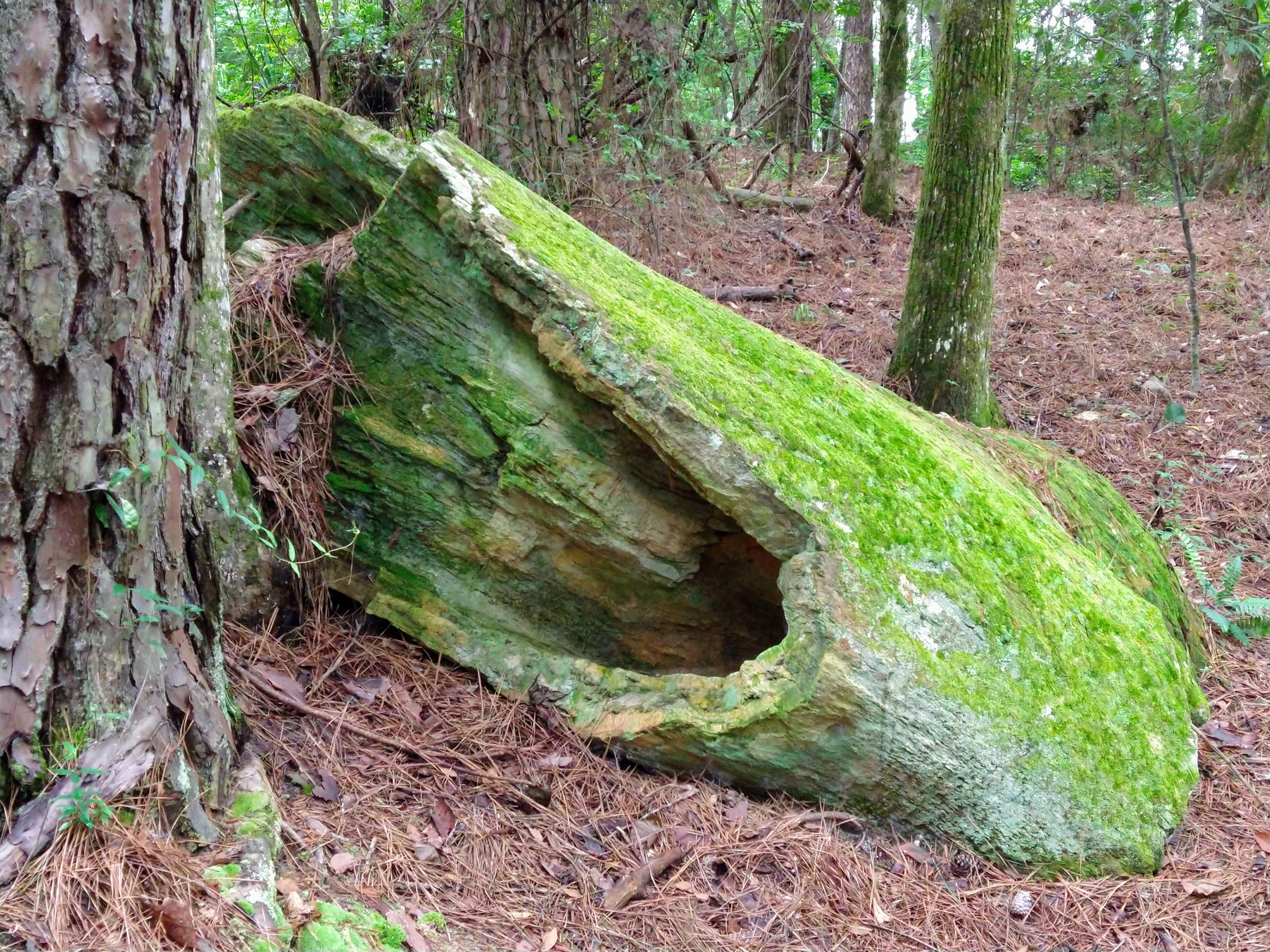

- Location within Mississippi
- Location: Madison County, Mississippi
- Nearest city: Flora
- Coordinates: 32°31′15″N 90°19′23″W
- Designated: 1965
- Website: Official website

Mississippi Petrified Forest is a privately-owned park featuring a petrified forest located near Flora, Mississippi, in the United States. The park can be toured by admission fee. The forest is believed to have been formed 36 million years ago when fir, cypress and maple logs washed down an ancient river channel to the current site where they later became petrified. It is one of only two petrified forests in the eastern United States, the other being Gilboa Fossil Forest in New York. It was declared a National Natural Landmark in October 1965.

== Geology ==
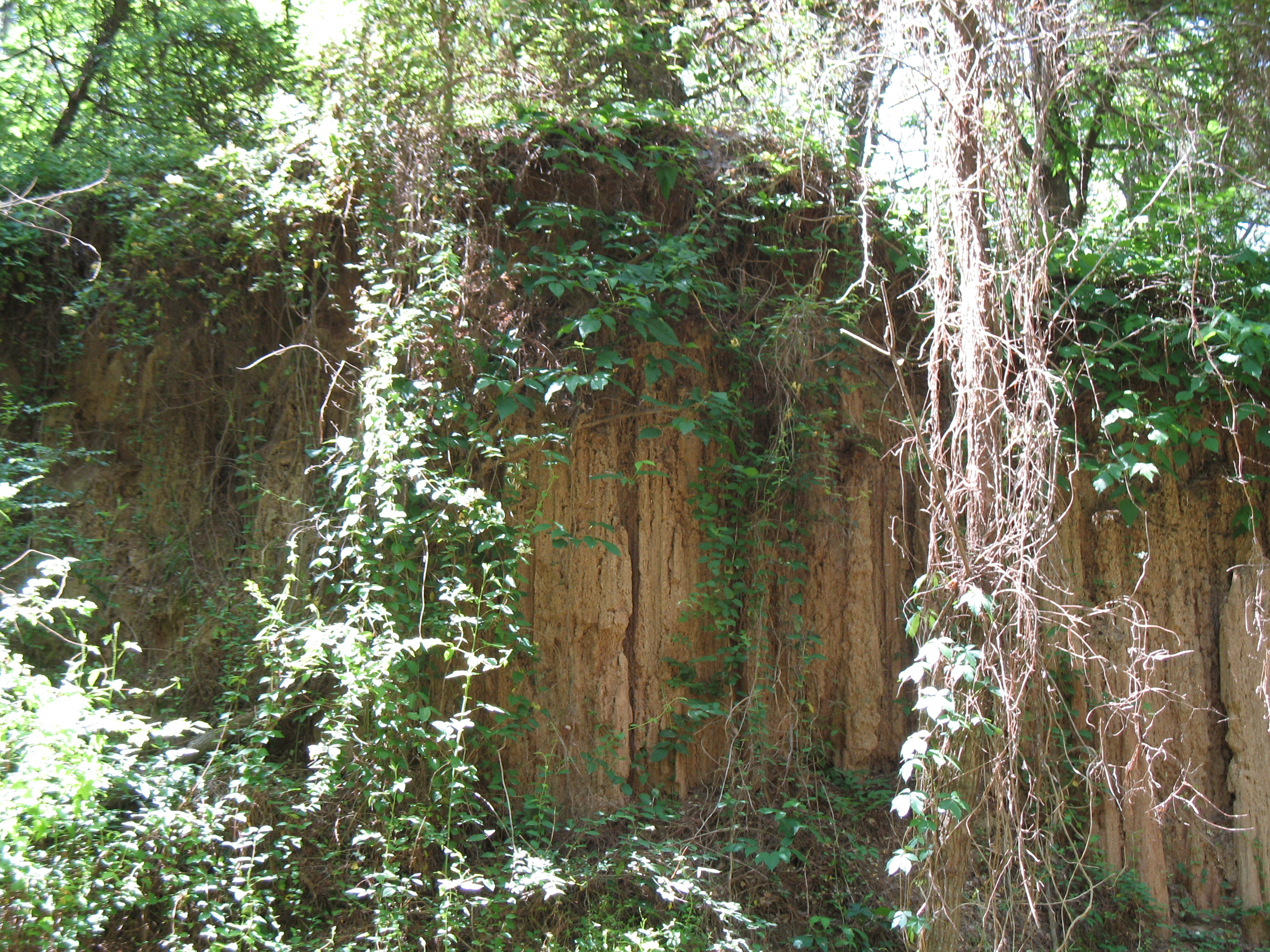
Loess cliff at the Mississippi Petrified Forest

The fossil wood of the Mississippi Petrified Forest are part of the Forest Hill Formation, a formation of fine sand and clay, deposited by an ancient river 33 million years ago, during the early Oligocene. The future site of the Mississippi Petrified Forest in the Oligocene was a floodplain, exposed by the retreat of global sea levels at the end of the Eocene where trees, such as firs, maples, and the extinct cypress Cupressinoxylon grew in an riparian environment. The species makeup of the forest suggests that the climate was cooler than modern Mississippi. The numerous trees of the petrified forest, some which are thought to have been 100 ft (30 m) tall and 1000 years old when buried, were thought to have been part of a log jam, due to the lack of stumps and the lack of smaller limbs on fossil logs, and were buried by the meandering action of ancient rivers.

The trees underwent petrifaction relatively close to the surface, in the weathering zone of the Forest Hill formation. Sulfide minerals associated with lignite chemically weather, creating a hyper-acidic environment around the fossil wood, which allows silica in the surrounding sand to replace cell walls with minerals such as chalcedony and quartz. The now silicfied trees were exposed when the loess overlaying the fossiliferous layers erode away, creating a badlands terrain where fossil logs are exposed in the walls of gullies and cliffs.

== History ==
While the petrified forest had been known to local settlers since the mid-19th century, the first publication to describe the forest was an article in the November 1913 issue of Popular Science Monthly by University of Mississippi professor Calvin S. Brown. Brown describes the forest as an "fine illustration of an interesting phenomenon of nature", while not being "rival in extent or in the coloring of its petrifactions the celebrated forests of Arizona". Later, the state geologist of Mississippi, Ephraim Noble Lowe, assigned the forest to the Jacksonian Formation.

In 1962, forty acres of farmland containing most of the exposed petrified logs was purchased by R.J. "Bob" and Shirl Schabilion, who conserved the exposed petrified logs and turned the forest into a tourist attraction. The forest was designated a National Natural Landmark in October 1965. In 1976, the forest was mentioned in a Mississippi State Senate resolution designating petrified wood as the state stone.

== Activities and amenities ==
After paying admission, the primary activity at the park is a 0.5 mi (0.80 km) long nature trail which features various points of interest, such as a cross-sectioned Sequoia trunk, and various exposed petrified logs, including the “Caveman’s Bench", a large piece of petrified wood which can be sat on. The park features a museum with examples of petrified wood found in every state and from other countries. The samples include a variety of plant materials, including leaves, fruits, cones and bark. Other fossils and fossil casts are on display, including dinosaur footprints, whale bones, turtle shells and mastodon bones found 9 mi (14 km) away from the park.

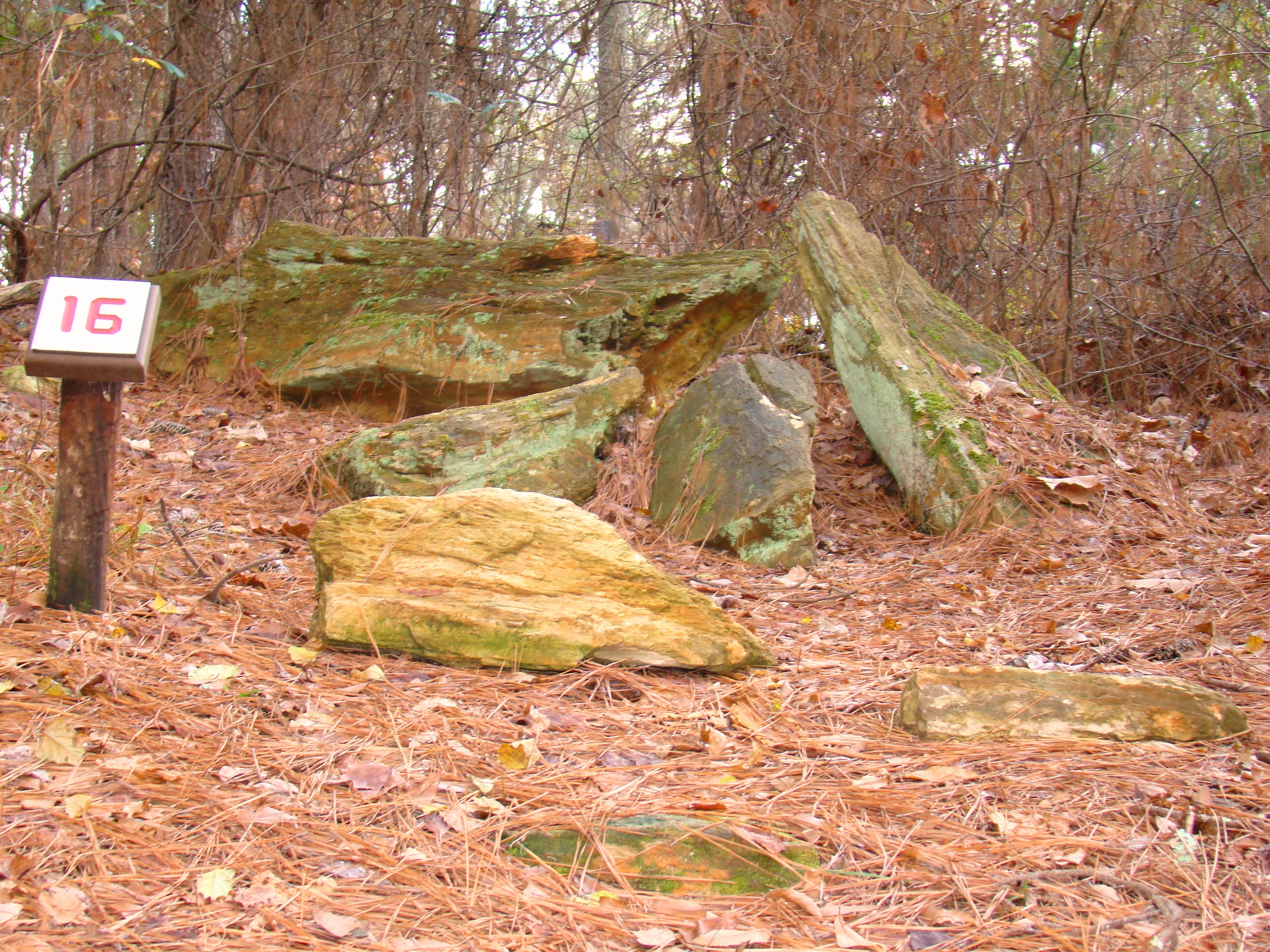
Petrified wood along the nature trail
