= Cockfield Formation =

Geologic formation in Mississippi

- Stratigraphic range: Paleogene
- Type: Formation
- Underlies: Moodys Branch Formation
- Overlies: Cook Mountain Formation

Location
- Region: Mississippi, Louisiana
- Country: United States

Type section
- Named by: T. Wayland Vaughan

The Cockfield Formation is a geologic formation in Mississippi. It preserves fossils dating back to the Paleogene period.

== See also ==
- List of fossiliferous stratigraphic units in Mississippi
- Paleontology in Mississippi
