= Cook Mountain Formation =

Geologic formation in the southern United States

- Stratigraphic range: Paleogene
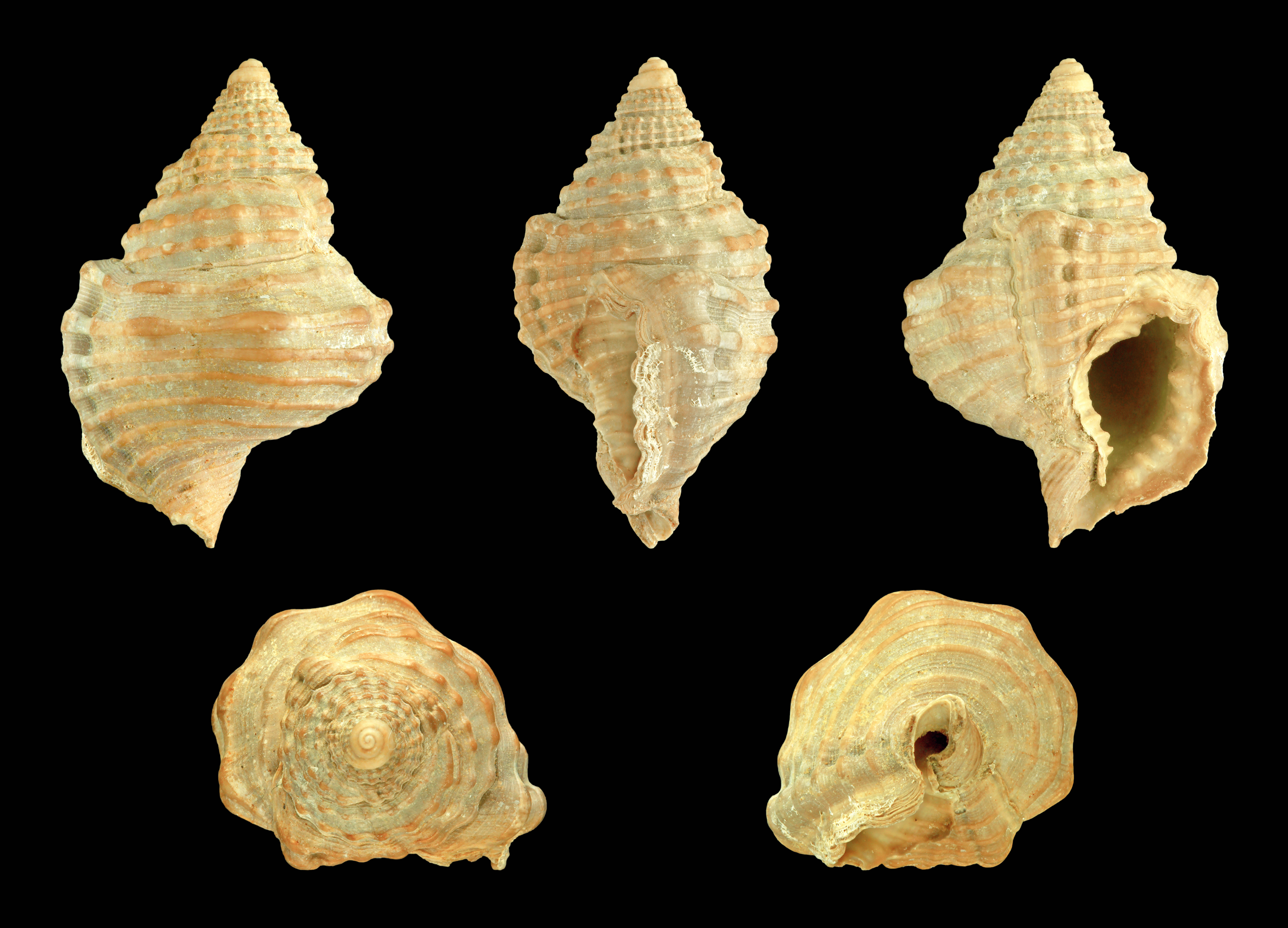
- Gastropoda fossils from the Cook Mountain Formation
- Type: Formation
- Underlies: Cockfield Formation
- Overlies: Sparta Formation

Location
- Region: Alabama, Louisiana, Mississippi, Texas
- Country: United States

Type section
- Named for: Cook Mountain, Houston County, Texas
- Named by: William Kennedy

The Cook Mountain Formation is a geologic formation in Alabama. It preserves fossils dating back to the Paleogene period.

== See also ==
- List of fossiliferous stratigraphic units in Alabama
- Paleontology in Alabama
