= Jackson Group =

- Stratigraphic range: Paleogene
- Type: Group
- Sub-units: White Bluff Formation, Redfield Formation
- Overlies: Claiborne Group

Location
- Region: Arkansas, North Carolina
- Country: United States

Type section
- Named by: Timothy Abbott Conrad

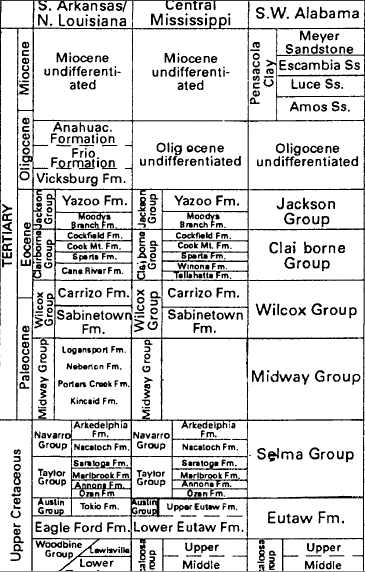
Jackson Group - stratigraphy

The Jackson Group is a geologic group in Arkansas, North Carolina and Tennessee. It preserves fossils dating back to the Paleogene to Neogene period. The area is where the type specimen of Basilosaurus, an ancient whale first thought to be a reptile, was found. Exposed only in bluffs along Mississippi River with thickness at least 60 feet. Primary rock type is sand. Secondary rock type is clay or mud. Other rock types include slit and lignite. "Light gray to buff, medium- to very fine-grained silty sand, interbedded with light gray clayey silt." From the Tertiary geological age.

Jackson Formation siltstones are exposed in western Tennessee in the Mississippi River bluffs.

== See also ==
- List of fossiliferous stratigraphic units in North Carolina
