= Moodys Branch Formation =

Geologic formation in Georgia, United States

- Stratigraphic range: Paleogene
- Type: Formation
- Underlies: Yazoo Formation
- Overlies: Cockfield Formation

Location
- Region: Mississippi
- Country: United States

The Moodys Branch Formation is a geologic formation in Mississippi. It preserves fossils dating back to the Paleogene period.

== See also ==
- List of fossiliferous stratigraphic units in Georgia (U.S. state)
- Paleontology in Georgia (U.S. state)
