= Byram Formation =

Geologic formation in Mississippi, United States

- Type: Formation

Location
- Region: Mississippi
- Country: United States

The Byram Formation is a geologic formation in Mississippi. It preserves fossils.

== See also ==
- List of fossiliferous stratigraphic units in Alabama
- Paleontology in Alabama
