= Claiborne Formation =

Geologic formation in the southern United States

- Stratigraphic range: Paleogene
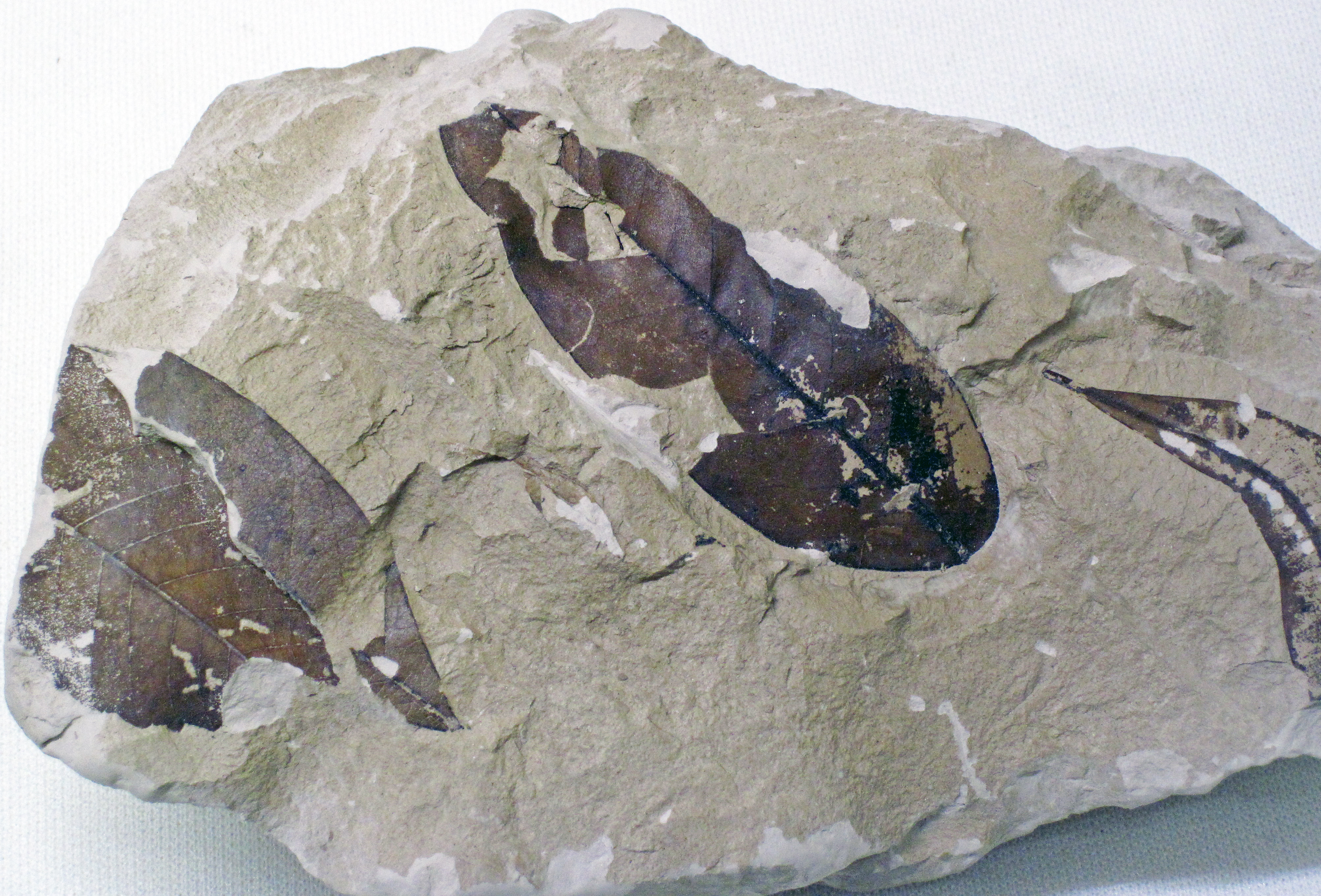
- Cladrastis-like sp. (Claiborne Formation, Eocene; w. Tennessee)
- Type: Formation

Location
- Region: Arkansas, Illinois, Kentucky, and Texas
- Country: United States

Type section
- Named by: Timothy Abbott Conrad

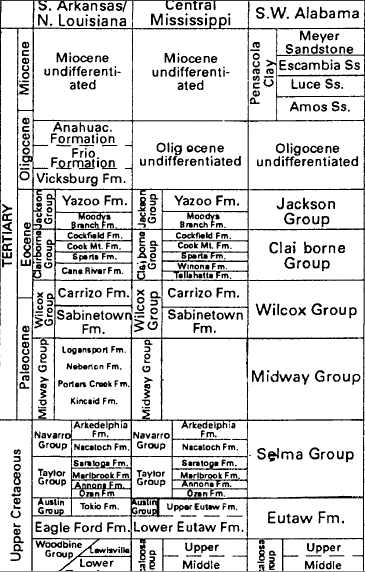
Claiborne Formation - stratigraphy

The Claiborne Formation, also referred to as the Claiborne Group, is a geologic formation in Arkansas, Illinois, Kentucky, and Texas. It preserves fossils dating back to the Paleogene period .

== See also ==
- List of fossiliferous stratigraphic units in Kentucky
