= Paleontology in Louisiana =

Paleontological research in the U.S. state of Louisiana

The location of the state of Louisiana

Paleontology in Louisiana refers to paleontological research occurring within or conducted by people from the U.S. state of Louisiana. Outcrops of fossil-bearing sediments and sedimentary rocks within Louisiana are quite rare. In part, this is because Louisiana's semi-humid climate results in the rapid weathering and erosion of any exposures and the growth of thick vegetation that conceal any fossil-bearing strata. In addition, Holocene alluvial sediments left behind by rivers like the Mississippi, Red, and Ouachita, as well as marsh deposits, cover about 55% of Louisiana and deeply bury local fossiliferous strata.

Nevertheless, paleontologists and geologists have succeeded in reconstructing much of the state's prehistory. Around the beginning of the Cambrian, Louisiana was part of a landmass called Rodinia. This supercontinent began to break up into the northern Laurentia and southern Gondwana. This division split off local rock which would become part of the southern supercontinent. The Iapetus Ocean filled the region between these landmasses, submerging Louisiana. While fossils of this age have been found within the region encompassed by the state's modern borders, they originated elsewhere and were incorporated as clasts in much younger rock and are therefore not informative about the wildlife of Paleozoic Louisiana.

Louisiana remained completely underwater until the mid-Mississippian, when continental drift began to slowly reunite the northern and southern landmasses into Pangaea. Pangaea itself began to break up early in the Mesozoic, separating North America from the other continents and forming the Gulf of Mexico. Louisiana's fossil record begins in the Late Cretaceous Epoch and documents the presence of sharks and marine invertebrates. After the Cretaceous ended and the Age of Mammals began Louisiana would see local sea levels rise and fall. During submersions Louisiana was home to a diverse marine invertebrate fauna and the early whale Basilosaurus. Fragments of leaves and petrified wood documented the contemporary local flora. Later in the Cenozoic, Louisiana became a coastal plain wildlife inhabited by mammals like camels and Pleistocene megafauna like mastodons.

Local Native Americans were the first humans to try to make sense of Louisiana's fossils. For instance, they interpreted mastodon remains as belonging to an ancient monster called the grandfather of the buffalo. Such remains and the Natives' mythological interpretations had already caught the attention of scientists like Georges Cuvier by the mid-1700s, which highlights Louisiana's long history of paleontology. The state's most famous fossil site is exposed on the east bank of the Red River of the South at Montgomery Landing.

== Prehistory ==
=== Proterozoic-Jurassic (pre-local fossil record geologic history) ===
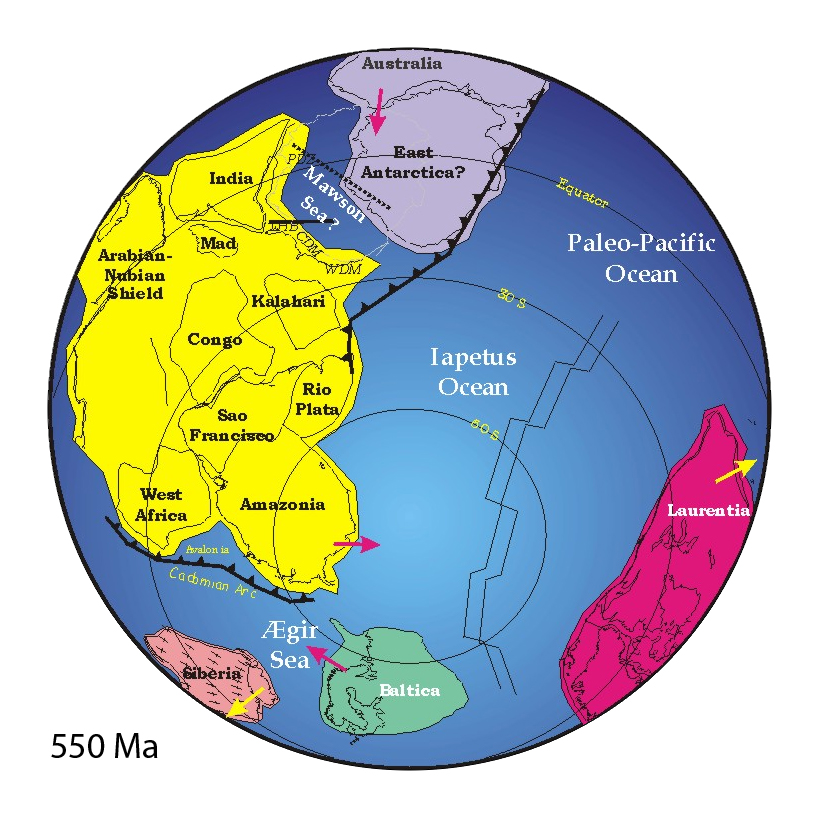
Location of the Iapetus Ocean 550 million years ago.

Geological research has revealed a long and complex geological history for the regional now occupied by Louisiana. During the Late Proterozoic and Early Cambrian, the supercontinent of Rodinia was beginning to break up. This division created two landmasses, the northern Laurentia, consisting of the continental crust and overlying sedimentary cover of prehistoric North America and the southern Gondwana, which included South America. Much of the geology underlying the Louisiana area was detached from Laurentia in the process, and the Precordillaria terrane was shifted by plate tectonics until it collided with and attached to what is now Argentina. The gap between Laurentia and Gondwana, where most of modern Louisiana was situated, was filled by the Iapetus Ocean. The Iapetus continued to submerge Louisiana between Early Cambrian to Middle Mississippian times, eventually becoming a body of water known as the Rheic Ocean. Oceanic crust, island arcs, and trenches that formed and sediments that accumulated during this period have largely been consumed by subduction. No local fossils are known from this time, although fossils of Devonian to Mississippian brachiopods, crinoids, mollusca, trilobites and other invertebrates can be found in chert gravel found within the relatively recent Pliocene Citronelle and Willis formations. These fossils and gravels that contain them occur in were eroded and transported from the Nashville Dome in the state of Tennessee.

Around this time, Laurentia and Gondwana began to reunite. During the collision between these continents, the remaining, small portion of oceanic crust and overlying sediment were shoved northward by Gondwana and incorporated into the Ouachita Mountains within Arkansas and Oklahoma during the Late Mississippian to the Early Pennsylvanian times. During the Middle Pennsylvanian, Permian, and Triassic, the region of Louisiana consisted entirely of dry land underlain by Gondwana-derived crust as part of the newly formed supercontinent of Pangea.

During the Mesozoic breakup of Pangea, the Gulf of Mexico opened by the separation of the North and South American plates. Initially during the Triassic through early Jurassic, tensional deformation created a series of basement grabens and half grabens, which filled with terrestrial red beds and volcanic rocks. During the Middle Jurassic Bathonian and Callovian ages the stretching of the crust between North and South America created a broad basin within the continental crust that opened initially to the Pacific Ocean and later to the Atlantic Ocean. This Middle to Late Jurassic rifting that created the Gulf of Mexico basin, the continental crust underlying Louisiana and adjacent areas was stretched and thinned forming the northern edge of Gulf of Mexico. Within the Gulf of Mexico basins, the widespread accumulation of thick Louann salt and other evaporate deposits occurred within a shallow, extremely salty Gulf of Mexico basin on top of thinned continental crust. By the end of the Early Cretaceous, the combination of deposition and subsidence had created the modern morphology of the Gulf of Mexico basin. Exposures of rocks older than Upper Cretaceous are lacking within the borders of Louisiana so that is when the local fossil record began.

=== Cretaceous ===
Louisiana was covered by shallow seawater during the Cretaceous. This sea was inhabited by marine invertebrates and sharks, whose remains were preserved in Bienville Parish. The rocks containing Cretaceous fossils are exposed only in small areas lying directly over the Protho and Rayburn salt domes in northwest Louisiana where they have been displaced from deep in the subsurface. Otherwise Cretaceous and older strata lie deeply buried beneath younger Cenozoic sediments where their fossils are inaccessible. In other words, it is unknown whether dinosaurs lived in Louisiana.

=== Cenozoic ===
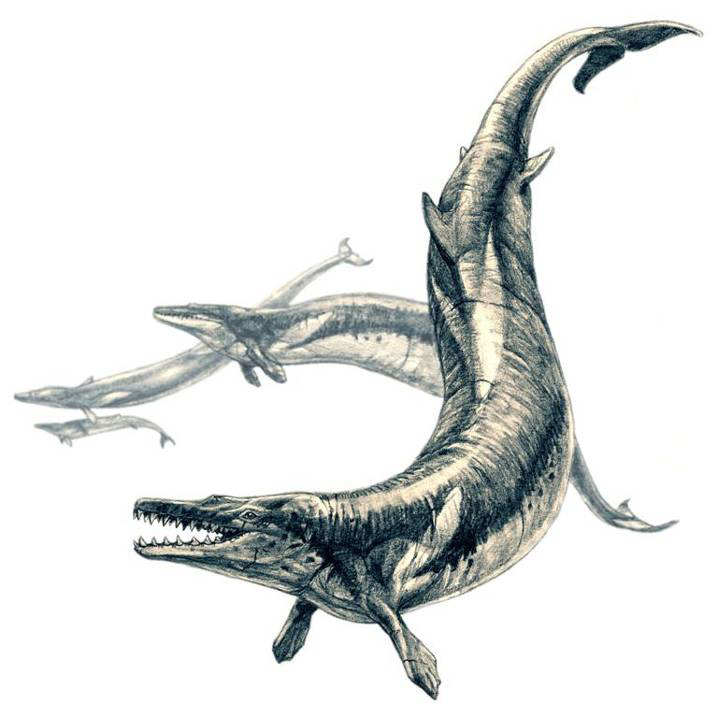
Restoration of Basilosaurus.

Since the beginning of the Cenozoic, the shoreline of the Gulf of Mexico has shifted back and forth across Louisiana in response to sea level fluctuations, sediment accumulation, and tectonic subsidence. A great diversity of life flourished in the Paleogene seawater that periodically transgressed on the state. Invertebrates from these environments included bryozoans, corals, foraminifera, gastropods, ostracods, pelecypods, and more. During the Late Eocene, the Montgomery Landing area was home to more than 50 different kinds of mollusc. Their remains would be preserved in a glauconitic marl deposit known formally as the Moodys Branch Marl. About 150 different species of marine invertebrate and vertebrate fossils were preserved in the Cane River Formation. The primitive whale Basilosaurus also made its home in the state and left behind fossils that would be preserved in the Yazoo clay. Many of the marine fossils from this period of the state's history were preserved in the Midway, Wilcox, Claiborne and Jackson groups. This stratigraphic interval documents the local terrestrial environments as well. Even in the Paleogene, Louisiana was home to rivers and deltas. Paleogene terrestrial deposits in Louisiana tend to lack fossils, so little information is available about what might have lived in these habitats. Nevertheless, poorly preserved petrified wood and leaf fossils document the flora of this period in some places. Later, during the Oligocene, the marine life of Louisiana included corals, foraminifera, gastropods, ostracods, and pelecypods. These were preserved in what is now the Vicksburg Group. The presence of bodies of flowing water like rivers or streams is recorded in the terrestrial sediments of the Catahoula Formation. Fossils from this ancient environment are rare, but include petrified wood.

During the Miocene epoch of the ensuing Neogene period west-central Louisiana held a coastal plain. The inhabitants of this environment were preserved in the sediments that became the Fleming Group. Research by Judith Schiebout has recovered a rich fauna, including numerous taxa of fossil vertebrates, from caliche conglomerates from this unit. Within Louisiana, the Pliocene strata consist of highly weathered and oxidized fluvial sand and gravel. East of the Mississippi River Valley, these sediments are called the Citronelle Formation, while west of the Mississippi River Valley, they are known as the Willis Formation. These strata are actually younger than their preserved fossils, which are the remains of Paleozoic life from central Tennessee. The Tennessean fossils were preserved in chert, which was broken down into gravel and transported into the area by the Tennessee River during the Neogene.

By the late Pleistocene, the Mississippi River Valley had formed and much of the state was a coastal plain environment. Pleistocene sediments cover roughly 20% of the surface of Louisiana largely in the southern part of the state. Nevertheless, fossils of this age are rare. Mollusks inhabited the state's brackish and marine waters. Terrestrial invertebrates included snails, who were preserved in the loess that blankets the uplands bordering either side of the Mississippi River Valley. More spectacular inhabitants of Pleistocene Louisiana included megafauna like camels and mastodons.

== History ==
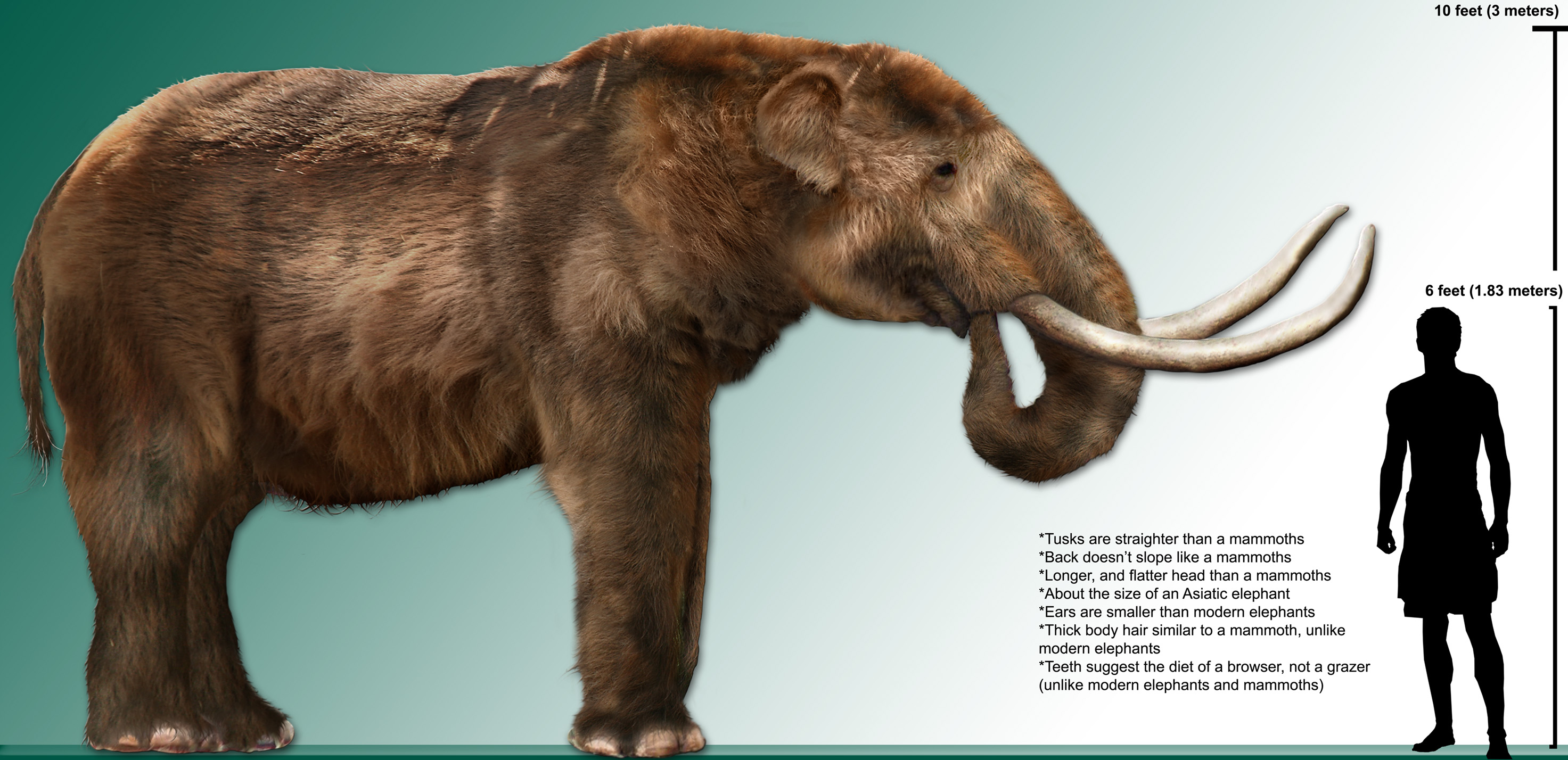
Mastodon.

Native peoples of Louisiana interpreted local mastodon fossils as the remains of monsters. They referred to the creatures as the grandfather of the buffalo. This subject was discussed in a 1748 letter from a French military officer named Fabri to Georges Cuvier. In 1804, such large fossil bones were discovered on land belonging to the Opelousa people. In 1816, the state's famous fossil site at Montgomery Landing was discussed in writing. It was not until 2004 that any dinosaur fossils were reported from Louisiana. The first such find was a single tooth reworked out of Cretaceous rocks and preserved in a Miocene-aged fossil deposit near Fort Polk. The dinosaur it came from probably lived, died, and was initially buried to the north in Arkansas. Later, it was eroded from Cretaceous sediments enclosing it and an ancestral Sabine River transported it southward to where it was found. The bones of Pleistocene megafauna, including mastodons, sometimes are found during the excavation of loess for fill or the construction of roads or buildings.

== Natural history museums ==
- Lafayette Natural History Museum & Planetarium, Lafayette
- Louisiana Museum of Natural History, Baton Rouge
- Louisiana Art and Science Museum, Baton Rouge

== Fossil sites ==
The most famous fossil sites within Louisiana are Creola Bluff at Montgomery Landing Site in Grant Parish, Louisiana and the Cane River Site, Natchitoches Parish, Louisiana. The Montgomery Landing Site was a 500 meters (1,600 ft) long and 14 meters (46 ft) high bluff that was the cutbank on the east side of the Red River. It exposed the top of the Cockfield Formation, the Moodys Branch Formation, and Tullos Member of the Yazoo Clay. In 1979, it was the site of a large whale skeleton discovery.

The Moodys Branch Formation and Yazoo Clay were extremely fossiliferous with over 100 species of invertebrate fossils and numerous species of vertebrate fossils, including one of the finest Eocene whale skulls known to science, having been found at this fossil site. Unfortunately, channelization of and construction along Red River has resulted in lower portions of the site being covered by sediment and the remaining exposures being completely covered by colluvium and overgrown by vegetation. As a result, fossils can no longer be found at this site. The Cane River Site is a low road-side cut made doing the construction of Interstate Highway 49 near Natchitoches, Louisiana. It exposes several feet of 44.5 to 46.5 Ma glauconitic silty clay belonging to the Cane River Formation. About 150 different species of marine invertebrate and vertebrate fossil have been found at this site. This site is slowly being destroyed by weathering and overgrown by vegetation.

== See also ==
- Paleontology in Arkansas
- Paleontology in Mississippi
- Paleontology in Texas
