= Paleontology in Mississippi =

Paleontological research occurring within or conducted by Mississippi

The location of the state of Mississippi

Paleontology in Mississippi refers to paleontological research occurring within or conducted by people from the U.S. state of Mississippi. The oldest rocks in Mississippi date back to the Late Devonian. At the time, the northeastern part of the state was covered in a sea where brachiopods, crinoids, and trilobites lived. Remains of contemporary local plants also ended up preserved in this environment. During the Late Carboniferous, Mississippi became part of a richly-vegetated coastal plain environment. There are no rocks dating to the Permian, Triassic, or Jurassic in the state. However, during the Cretaceous, evidence suggests that the state was covered by a sea home to cephalopods, mosasaurs and sharks. Local trees left behind petrified wood and amber. By the Cenozoic, only the southern half of the state was covered in seawater, where the early whale Basilosaurus lived. On land, trees that were home to some of the earliest known primates left behind petrified wood. For the remainder of the Cenozoic, the state's climate cooled. Many fossils have been serendipitously discovered in the state by people looking for fossil fuels. Significant fossil finds in Mississippi include some of the oldest known primate fossils. The Eocene whales Basilosaurus cetoides and Zygorhiza kochii are the Mississippi state fossils.

== Prehistory ==
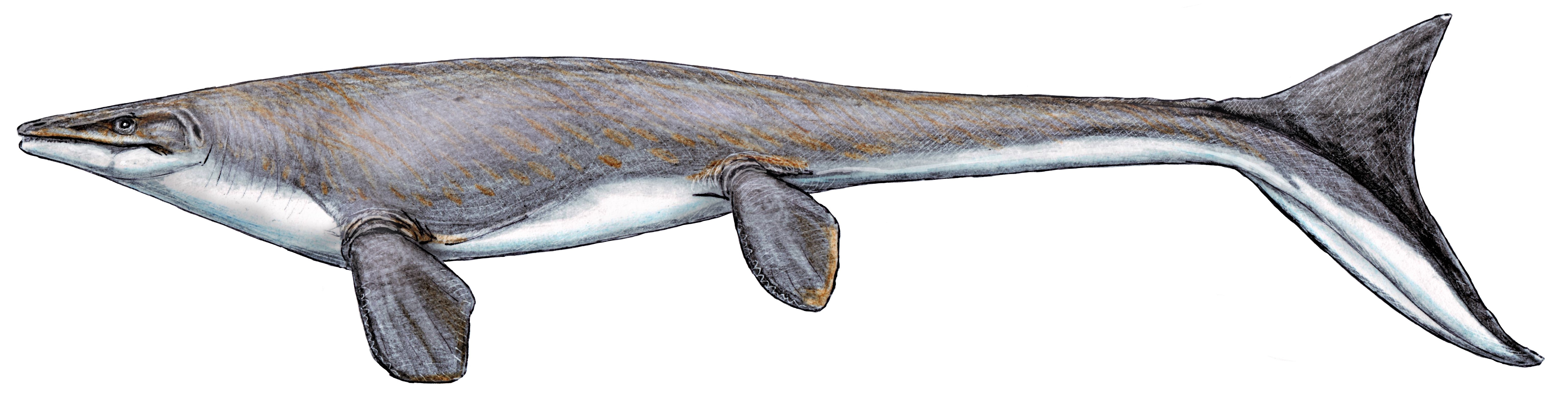
Platecarpus.

The oldest rocks in Mississippi date back to the Late Devonian. At the time, the northeastern part of the state was covered in seawater. Some areas of this sea were quite deep and had very low levels of dissolved oxygen. Brachiopods, crinoids, molluscs, and trilobites lived there. Remains of contemporary local plants also ended up preserved in this environment. However, the sea withdrew from the state during the Late Carboniferous. A lush coastal plain habitat took its place. This plain was forested by early trees and plants that resembled ferns. However, for the remainder of the Paleozoic, local sediments were eroding rather than being deposited. This erosive spell continued into the Mesozoic. Sediment deposition did not resume until Pangaea began to break up. The shallow sea that formed in Mississippi at that time was home to a rich fauna of both invertebrates and vertebrates. Cretaceous marine invertebrate life of Mississippi included cephalopods, coccolithophores, coelenterates, gastropods, the tube-shaped trace fossils Halymenites major, oysters, and scaphopods. Local vertebrates included the Late Cretaceous mosasaur Platecarpus tympaniticus. Sharks also left behind many fossilized teeth.

Cretaceous plant life left behind few fossils in Mississippi. Wood from local trees was preserved through petrifaction. Amber was preserved in Tishomingo County. The amber is especially common at a location roughly 1.6 miles east of Iuka. Specimens vary significantly in size from small bits to chunks the size of marbles. Some of the amber specimens contain bits of leaf inside them, but these inclusions are uncommon and often poorly preserved. Fossil leaves of this age were preserved in the area northeast of Fulton. Both of Mississippi's pre-Mesozoic and Cretaceous deposits formed in what is now the southern region of the state, in a physiographic province called the Gulf Coastal Plain. Dinosaurs like duck-bills and ostrich dinosaurs were preserved in the state. An extremely rare Maastrichian ceratopsian tooth was found in 2016, making it the third ceratopsian remain known from Appalachia.

In the early Cenozoic, southern Mississippi was sometimes inundated by a tropical sea. During the Paleocene epoch, Clay County was home to foraminiferans and ostracods. Bony fish, sharks, and whales also lived in the early Cenozoic seas of Mississippi. Unlike southern Mississippi, the state's northern half persisted as a terrestrial environment covered by forests and swamps. Contemporary local trees left behind petrified wood. Early Tertiary primate fossils were preserved near Meridian. The primates of Tertiary Mississippi are among the oldest known in the world. During the Eocene, Scott County was home to foraminiferans and ostracods. It was also home to large oysters and the primitive whale Basilosaurus. During the later part of the Cenozoic era, the local climate cooled. Contemporary sediments preserved local freshwater molluscs and mammals.

== History ==
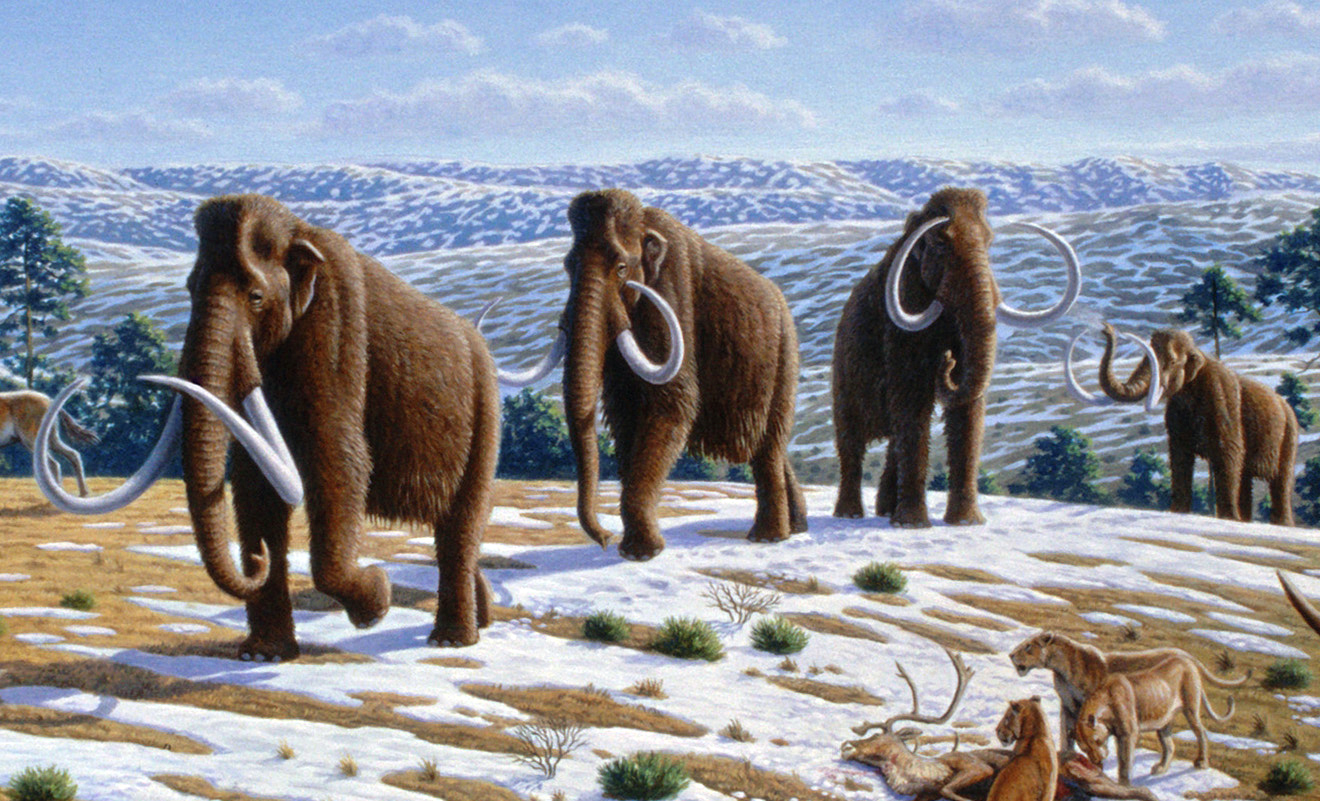
Woolly mammoths.

The Choctaw people of Mississippi believed that cannibalistic giants once used mammoths as beasts of burden. These beliefs could have been influenced by the folklore of runaway African slaves rather than being pure fossil legends in the strict sense, but the Paiute tribe of northern Nevada did wage a three year war against a race of cannibalistic red-haired giants, who they trapped in Lovelock Cave and then burned to death. Since the implementation of paleontology as a formal science in the state, many Cretaceous fossil sites have been serendipitously discovered in the process of searching for oil. Even prior to 1940, many such serendipitously discovered Cretaceous fossil sites were known. More recent remains have also aided the search for fossil fuels in Mississippi. Paleocene foraminiferans and ostracods have played this role in Clay County and younger Eocene fossils of the same taxa have also contributed to the search in Scott County.

== Protected areas ==
- Mississippi Petrified Forest

== Natural history museums ==
- Mississippi Museum of Natural Science, Jackson

== See also ==
- Paleontology in Alabama
- Paleontology in Arkansas
- Paleontology in Louisiana
- Paleontology in Tennessee
