= Geology of Georgia (U.S. state) =

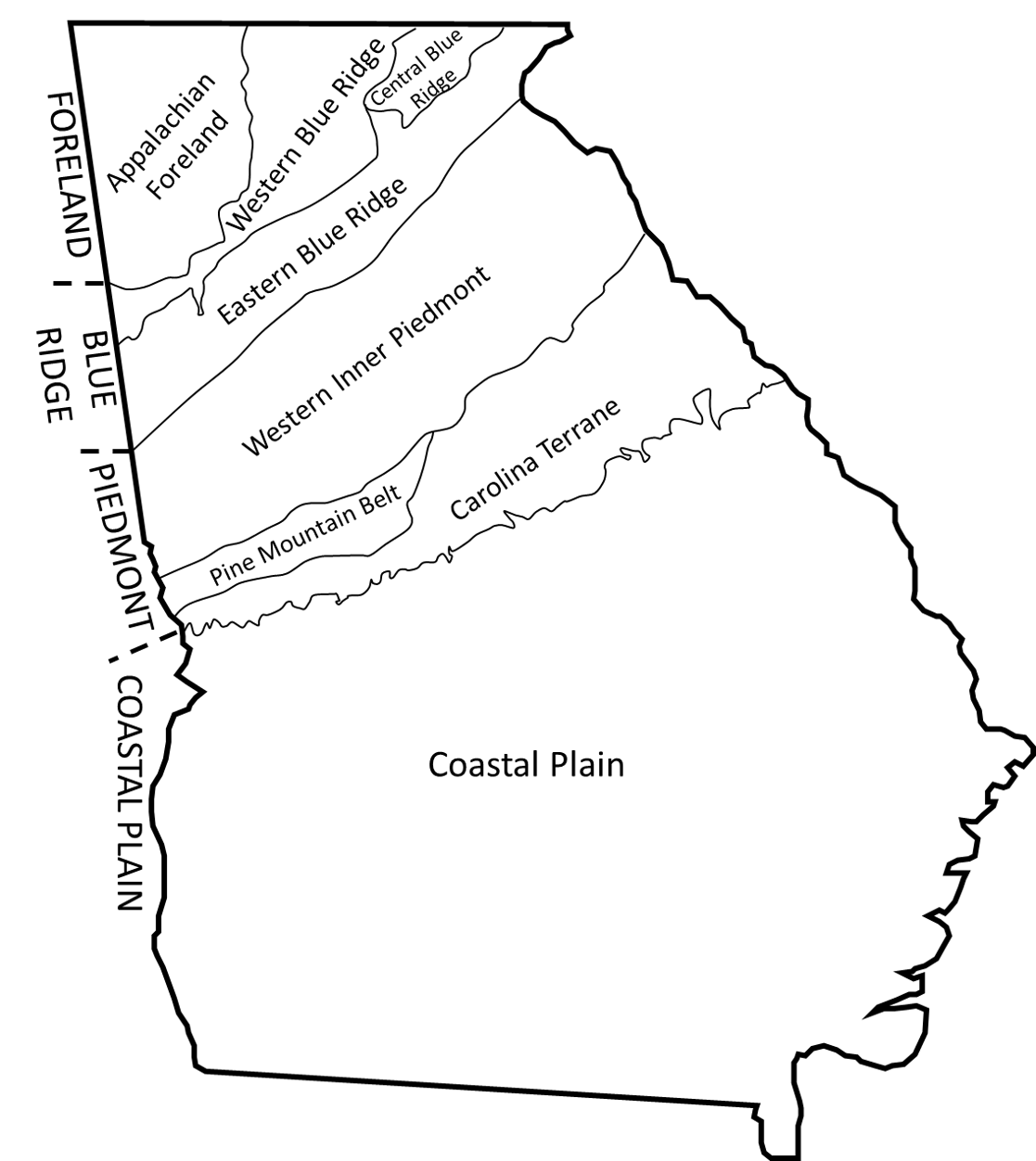
Generalized geologic regions of the state of Georgia (USA)

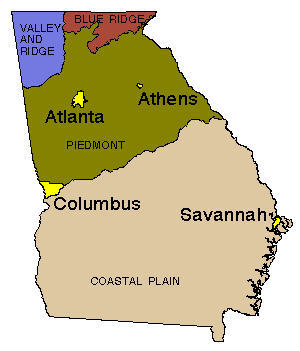
Physiographic regions of Georgia

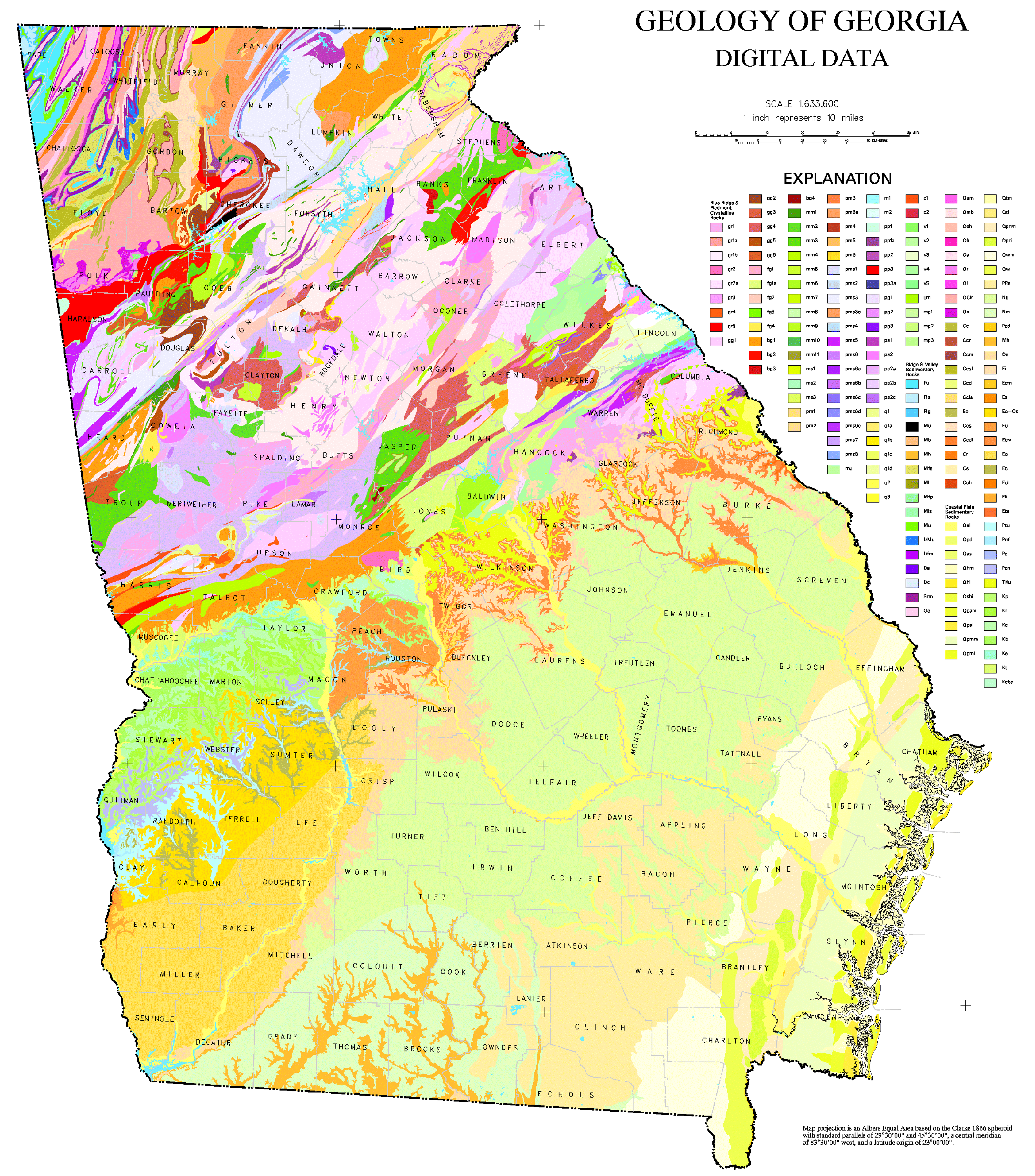
Geologic map of Georgia

The U.S. state of Georgia is commonly divided into four geologic regions that influence the location of the state's four traditional physiographic regions. The four geologic regions include the Appalachian foreland, Blue Ridge, Piedmont, and Coastal Plain. These four geologic regions commonly share names with and typically overlap the four physiographic (i.e. topographic) regions of the state: the Appalachian Plateau and adjacent Valley and Ridge; the Blue Ridge; the Piedmont and the Coastal Plain.

The geologic regions of the state, established by geologists based on relationships between stratigraphic units, significantly influence the physiographic regional names used by physical geographers. Geologic regions of the state, however, do not perfectly coincide with physiographic regions of the state. Most geologic regions (terranes) in the state are separated from one another by major thrust faults that formed during the growth of the Appalachian Mountains. The Appalachian foreland, for example, is separated from the geologic Blue Ridge by the Talladega-Cartersville-Great Smoky fault. The geologic Blue Ridge is separated from the geologic Piedmont by the Brevard fault zone. The Fall Line, the surface expression of the Coastal Plain unconformity, is the geologic boundary between the Piedmont and the Coastal Plain.

== Appalachian Foreland ==
The geological region known as the Appalachian foreland includes the physiographic Valley and Ridge and Appalachian Plateau. The Appalachian foreland is dominated by sedimentary rocks that formed along the Paleozoic margin of North America both before and during growth of the Appalachian Mountains. The Appalachian foreland of Georgia, which lies in the northwest corner of the state, is separated from metamorphic rocks of the western Blue Ridge by the Talladega-Cartersville-Great Smoky fault. The oldest rocks of the foreland include Cambrian-Ordovician stratigraphy of the Chilhowee Group, Shady Dolomite, Rome Formation, Conasauga Group, and Knox Group. Each of these rock units were deposited on the passive margin of North America after it rifted away from the supercontinent of Rodinia during the Neoproterozoic, but prior to the earliest phases of Appalachian mountain building in the Paleozoic. By the Early Ordovician Period (485 - 470 million years ago), a subduction zone had developed offshore of the North American continent (Laurentia) in the adjacent Iapetus Ocean. The formation of this subduction zone marks the transition from a passive to active tectonic margin for this part of ancient North America, and ultimately led to the tectonic activity that resulted in Appalachian mountain building in this part of the orogen. In Georgia, Paleozoic sedimentary rocks of the Appalachian foreland younger than Early Ordovician in age were deposited as part of a retroarc and younger foreland basin along the flanks of the growing Appalachian mountains. Folded rock layers of the Valley and Ridge in Georgia, as well as their flat-lying equivalents in the Appalachian Plateau, include limestone, sandstone, shale and other sedimentary rocks. Many of these rocks serve as important economic resources in the state, including construction-grade limestone, barite, ochre and small amounts of coal. The physiographic Valley and Ridge province owes its existence to folding of Paleozoic strata during the Alleghanian orogeny and the formation of Pangea. Many of the prominent, linear mountains in the Valley and Ridge province are classic hogback topographic features. The Appalachian foreland of Georgia is an excellent example of a foreland fold and thrust belt that develops during continental collisions. Rocks of the Appalachian Plateau, in the extreme northwest corner of the Appalachian foreland, are the relatively undeformed equivalents of folded and faulted strata in the folded Valley and Ridge physiographic region.

== Blue Ridge ==
The Blue Ridge geologic region includes metamorphic rocks between the Appalachian foreland (i.e., southeast of the Talladega-Cartersville-Great Smoky fault) and the Piedmont region (i.e., northwest of the Brevard fault zone). Rocks of the geological Blue Ridge underlie the physiographic Blue Ridge region of the state, which are restricted to the North Georgia mountains. However, rocks of the geological Blue Ridge also underlie wide swaths of topography generally assigned to the physiographic Piedmont region. The highest points in Georgia, including Brasstown Bald, are underlain by rocks of the geological Blue Ridge. The Blue Ridge consists primarily of metamorphic rocks, which are the metamorphosed equivalents of sedimentary rocks or igneous rocks. The geological Blue Ridge is commonly divided by geologists into the western Blue Ridge and equivalent Talladega belt (Alabama and western Georgia), central Blue Ridge (northernmost Georgia), and eastern Blue Ridge terranes. The physiographic Blue Ridge region, which lies in the northernmost western Blue Ridge and central Blue Ridge geological terranes, marks the highest topography in the state. Rocks of the geological Blue Ridge, however, extend from the physiographic Blue Ridge, southwest across the state without holding up high mountains. The geological eastern Blue Ridge includes metavolcanic rocks of the Georgia Gold Belt. From the discovery of gold in the Georgia Gold Belt in 1828, enough gold was mined in the area to cause a branch mint of the United States Mint to be located in Dahlonega, Georgia. The region also includes igneous intrusions of granite and diabase. Marble and talc are other resources produced in the Blue Ridge in Georgia. Rocks of the western Blue Ridge are interpreted to be metamorphosed equivalents of stratigraphy in the Appalachian foreland, all of which formed along the Paleozoic margin of ancient North America. Rocks of the eastern Blue Ridge in Georgia were deposited in a marginal basin (back-arc) basin between the Paleozoic North American continent and a volcanic arc terrane in the Iapetus Ocean. Rocks of the central Blue Ridge record deep burial and metamorphic conditions attributed to the Taconic orogeny during the Middle-Late Ordovician, but rocks of the western and eastern Blue Ridge weren't metamorphosed until the Carbonifereous.

== Piedmont ==
The Piedmont geologic region is composed of igneous and metamorphic rocks that include schist, amphibolite, gneiss, migmatite, and granite, among others. This region is more hilly than mountainous and is marked by lower elevations than the physiographic Blue Ridge. The Piedmont physiographic region of Georgia is underlain by rocks of the geological Blue Ridge and geological Piedmont terranes. The geological Piedmont is limited to rocks southeast of the Brevard fault zone and northwest of the Coastal Plain unconformity (Fall Line), whereas the physiographic Piedmont stretches from the Fall Line to the Valley and Ridge across much of the state. The Piedmont is home to prominent features like Stone Mountain and the Brevard fault zone, which runs parallel to the Chattahoochee River and bisects cities like Suwanee, Atlanta, Buford, and Duluth. The geological Piedmont includes metamorphic rocks of the Dadeville Complex, an Ordovican arc terrane that lay seaward of the North American continental margin and a fringing back-arc basin. It also includes rocks of the Opelika Complex, which are considered to be stratigraphic equivalents of rocks in the eastern Blue Ridge of Georgia and Alabama. Rocks of the Dadeville Complex, Opelika Complex, and Pine Mountain belt in southwestern Georgia comprise the western Inner Piedmont. Each of these geological terranes formed on the North American tectonic plate during the Neoproterozoic and Paleozoic. The southeastern portion of the geological Piedmont includes rocks of the Carolina terrane (Carolinia) and is interpreted to have formed along the ancient margin of Gondwana. Rocks of the Carolina terrane collided with ancient North American during the final stages of Appalachian mountain building, but remained sutured to the continent following the Mesozoic breakup of Pangea and the separation of Africa and South America during formation of the Atlantic Ocean. Rocks of the geological Piedmont terrane extend southeast beneath younger, flat-lying sedimentary rocks of the Coastal Plain.

== Coastal Plain ==
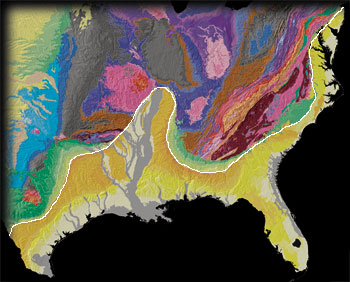
The Coastal Plain of the U.S.

The Coastal Plain in Georgia is part of a geologic and physiographic region that extends from New Jersey to Texas and consists of sedimentary rocks deposited in the Late Cretaceous to Holocene periods. It is divided from the Piedmont by the Fall Line, which passes through Georgia from Augusta in the east, then southwestward to Macon, then to Columbus and finally westward to Montgomery, Alabama. The Fall Line is the surface expression of the Coastal Plain unconformity, an erosional surface that separates younger, overlying rocks of the Coastal Plain from older igneous and metamorphic rocks of the Appalachian Piedmont beneath the unconformity. The Coastal Plain includes the Sandhills or Carolina Sandhills, a 10–35 mi (16–56 km) wide region within the Atlantic Coastal Plain province. Rocks in the exposed Coastal Plain region of Georgia range from the Late Cretaceous Tuscaloosa Formation to modern Holocene sediments actively forming along the Atlantic coast. In the subsurface, Triassic basalts of the South Georgia rift lie beneath younger sedimentary deposits in extensive, regional grabens. Rocks of the Georgia Coastal Plain include marine and terrestrial fossils and rare fragments of dinosaurs. The main mineral resource of the Coastal Plain in Georgia is kaolin.

== See also ==
- Geologic mapping of Georgia (U.S. state)
- Geology of the Appalachians
- Geology of the United States
- List of mountains in Georgia (U.S. state)
