= Conasauga shale =

Cambrian era rock formation in the southeast United States

Coordinates: 33°41′55.09″N 85°36′14.74″W

Conasauga Shale
- Stratigraphic range: Cambrian
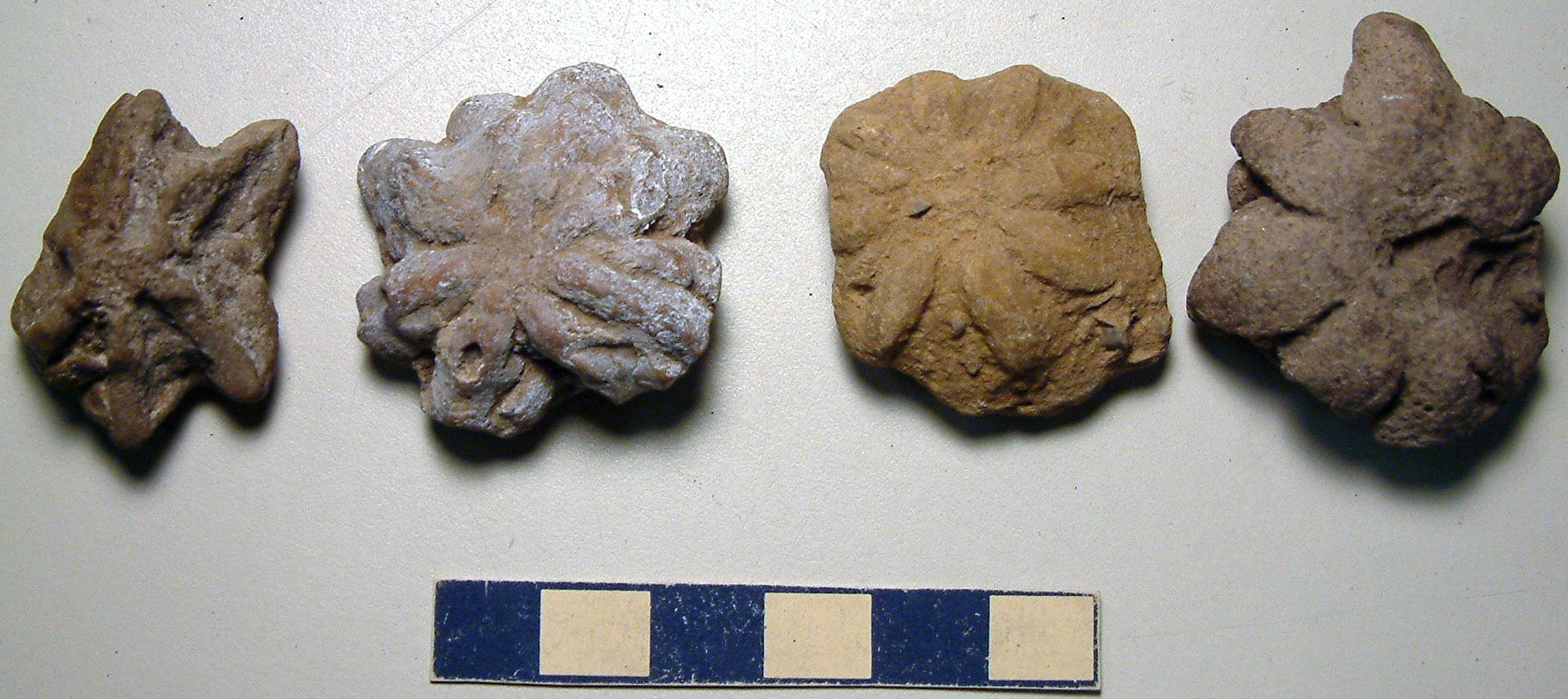
- Fossils from the Conasauga Formation
- Type: Formation
- Unit of: Conasauga Group
- Underlies: Copper Ridge Dolomite
- Overlies: Rome Formation
- Thickness: Up to 2,000'

Lithology
- Primary: Shale
- Other: Carbonates

Location
- Region: Alabama, Georgia, Tennessee
- Country: United States

Type section
- Named for: Conasauga Valley, northwestern GA

The Conasauga Shale Field is a Cambrian Period part of the Appalachian thrust and fault region of Alabama, Georgia, and Tennessee, United States.

The subterranean formation consists of shales and carbonates over 1,600 - 2,000 feet thick in certain areas. Due to Thrust faulting the overall thickness has been exaggerated in some sources by several thousand feet.

Several preliminary drillings found it could be one of the larger reserves of natural gas in U.S. history.

== Geography ==
The Conasauga shale overlies the Rome Formation, and in turn is overlain by the Knox Supergroup. The Conasauga Shale is present as far south as Talladega County, Alabama, and extends north to Calhoun, Cleburne, St. Clair, Etowah, Cherokee, and DeKalb Counties, and into Northwest Georgia.

The Conasauga has one of the thickest shale sections in the world. Total organic content of the shale ranges from 0.5% to 1.5%. The Schlumberger Montage Shale log, filed with the Alabama Oil and Gas Board, calculates gas in place as 330.2 billion feet^{3} per square mile of gas (3.57 billion m^{3} per km^{2}) in place for every 4,270 ft (1,300 m) thickness of shale. This area has a unique subsidence and thrust zone under it that geologist William Thomas has classified as a "mushwad".

== Natural gas ==
The Conasauga Shale is a shale gas reservoir, like the Barnett Shale in Texas. The shale is very hard, and until technological advancements as have been honed in the exploration and drilling of the Barnett Shale, it was too costly to extract. The Conasauga Shale is hydro-sensitive, as the shale will absorb water and swell, thereby slowing the flow of gas. Successful drilling of the Conasauga involves utilizing techniques minimizing water use and flow into the open-hole drilling techniques. Casing is normally used only until penetration into the Conasauga, and then left open-hole so that multiple gas layers within the hole may flow to the borehole.

=== Field history ===
- Discovery: 1980s
- Start of production: 2005

=== History and well completion ===
The J.J. Young 34-2 #1 well in St. Clair County, Alabama (Alabama State Oil and Gas Board Permit No. 4325) was drilled as a joint venture between Amoco and ARCO. This well was spudded on October 30, 1984. The well was initially drilled with air to approximately 2,100 ft (640 m) when it encountered a significant quantity of gas that reportedly required closing the blowout preventer. The engineers for both Amoco and Arco said that the J. J. Young #1 would flow over one million feet^{3} of gas per day (over 28,000 m^{3}). The well was plugged on February 16, 1985. It was discovered that Amoco did not have title to nine forties around the Young #1 well because the minerals had been severed in 1888.

During the late 1980s Michigan Oil Co. acquired 8,000 acres (32 km^{2}) in this area. Before Michigan Oil could drill this prospect, they were bought out by Pan-Oak Corp in 1991. In 1993, they drilled the Young #2 well, 150 ft (46 m) north of the #1 well. They drilled to a total depth of 3,022 ft (921 m) and were unable to log the well. The driller reported that they had good gas shows.

=== Dominion ===
In July 2002, Red Hills Resources started leasing in the Young #1 area. After acquiring approximately 9,000 acres (36 km^{2}), they put together the Big Canoe Prospect package, which was offered to numerous potential industry partners. In late 2004, Red Hills sold 51% of the prospect to Dominion Black Warrior Basin Inc.

Dominion took over operations of the prospect and on March 8, 2005, spudded the Dawson 34-3 No. 1 well 970 ft (300 m) west of the Young #1 well. After drilling out from under the surface pipe, they encountered their first good gas kick at 2,510 ft (770 m), which was flared to the pit. The second major gas show was encountered at 3,510 ft (1,070 m), when the well exploded with a huge fire ball.

The next day, while drilling at 5,053 ft (1,540 m), the rig broke down and was down for approximately 30 hours During this time the well was flared to the pit, at an estimated 750 to 1000 million feet^{3} of gas per day with no apparent pressure draw down. When drilling resumed, it started to rain, and within three hours the roaring gas flare slowed to a 15-foot (4.6 m) lazy flare. At 4:30 PM on March 19, the well encountered its third major gas show when it blew out at 5,915 ft (1,803 m). The explosion of a 100+ -foot (30+ m) plus fire ball was witnessed by numerous valley residents.

=== Energen ===
In January 2006, Energen drilled the Williams 29-12 #1 well 10 mi (16 km) southwest of the Dawson #1 well. Immediately after the well was drilled, Energen and Dominion entered a bidding war for the remaining leases in north St. Clair County.

The Dominion Andrews 27-14 #3 well was spudded April 20, 2006 and drilled to 3,412 ft (1,040 m), where the bit fell three feet (0.91 m) and then the well blew out. The rig's blowout preventers could not handle the pressure. Dominion fought the well for three days, during which the rig was at imminent risk of burning down. Their head engineer testified at the Alabama Oil & Gas Board hearing on February 16, 2007: "We brought in world-class well control experts to control this well," and "The gas encountered presented a significant danger to the drilling rig, the personnel, and it had to be controlled." When the opposing attorney asked him how good the well was, the engineer said, "To my knowledge we never put that gas through any type of meter." When asked about pressure information for the well, he falsely responded they had none, though after they got the well under control, they bolted a three-port manifold to the blowout preventer. The well's shut-in pressure was reported at 1,835 psi (12,650 kPa). The crew opened up all three ports, and the well blew for twelve hours at 1,755 psi (12,100 kPa) flowing pressure with no pressure draw down. When they shut the well in, it returned to 1,835 psi (12,650 kPa). The size of the ports were not reported, however, it was estimated that the well was flowing at 8 to 10 million cubic feet (230,000 to 280,000 m^{3}) of gas per day. Dominion cemented the drill string in the hole by trying to hang cement at the top of the hole. The cement fell to the bottom of the hole sealing off the good gas zone.

The Oakes E23-11 #26 was permitted to a depth of 10,000 ft (3,000 m). The well was spudded on February 11, 2007. They set 2,032 ft (619 m) of 9 5/8-inch (240 mm) surface casing. They encountered an excellent gas-filled fracture zone at approximately 7,600 ft (2,300 m).

This well is hooked up and selling gas. Late afternoon, on May 14, 2007, this well was flowing at 808 million feet^{3} of gas per day with a flowing tubing pressure of 3000 psi. All the surface equipment was covered in several inches of ice, indicating that some CO_{2} still remained in the gas.

The Burgess E28-11 #58 well, while drilling (on April 12 that year) at 3,500 ft (1,100 m) kicked so hard that they had to light the flare stack. Dominion prefers to vent the gas but is under orders from the state to flare the gas if it exceeds 300 million feet^{3} of gas per day. The local residents said it had a 30-foot (9.1 m) vertical flare and roared like a train. On April 14, while drilling at 5,000 ft (1,500 m), the well blew out with a ball of fire that went over 100 ft (30 m) into the air. It rattled windows over a mile away. After everything settled down, the vertical stack was burning a 50-to-70-foot (15 to 21 m) flare. One report has the well flaring 500 million cubic feet of gas for the first hour. Drilling resumed after three hours. They reached total depth of 8,500 ft (2,600 m) on April 19, 2007.

Energen Resources out of Birmingham, Alabama started buying leases in the St.Clair and Etowah Counties in June 2005. In February 2006, Energen drilled the Williams 19-12-101 well 10 mi (16 km) southeast of the Dawson #1. In March 2006, Energen drilled the GAA 23-12 #1 well 9 mi (14 km) northeast of the Dawson #1. This well never reached planned total depth due to deviation problems, and was plugged.

=== Chesapeake Energy ===
Chesapeake and Energen have a joint venture covering 100,000 acres (400 km^{2}) gross, for which Chesapeake reportedly paid Energen $750 per acre, plus a commitment of $30 million for joint drilling and development. Chesapeake and Energen have a non-compete agreement, whereby they share additional acreage acquired by either entity.

=== Highmount ===
Loews Corporation, controlled by the wealthy Tisch family, became a substantial leader in the Conasauga Shale in July 2007 via the purchase of natural gas assets from Dominion. A portion of these purchased assets included all of Dominion Black Warrior Basin, holder of all Dominion's Conasauga Shale assets and a fully owned subsidiary of Dominion. Loews assigned Dominion's Alabama operations to Highmount Exploration.

=== Northeast Alabama Gas District ===
Northeast Alabama Gas District's territory covers Talladega, Calhoun, and Cleburne Counties, less the areas inside municipal limits and one small area in the Southern part of Cleburne County currently served by another Gas District. The Gas District's territorial limits begin 1.5 mi (2.4 km) outside of each incorporated municipality in these three counties and 1,000 ft (300 m) from any municipal pipelines that extent outside the municipalities.

The Gas District is a public corporation in the State of Alabama. The District has granted an exclusive franchise for drilling, production and pipeline transportation for natural gas within its territory to a Special District created specifically for this purpose. Owners of mineral rights within this territory desiring their natural gas reserves to be developed have the option to sign an agreement with the Gas District. Royalties provided by the District are equal to 20% of production and are higher than those reportedly being offered by the for-profit operators in surrounding areas. The Gas District has five charitable trusts for education, health care, social services, long-term care and economic development and job creation that receive a portion of the natural gas revenues to provide additional benefits for residents in the region.

=== Acreage positions ===
- Northeast Alabama Gas District: provided an exclusive franchise for drilling, development and transportation of natural gas within its territory to sister organization Special District: 1,224,960 acres (4,957.2 km^{2}) gross.
- Chesapeake–Energen joint venture: 100,000 acres (400 km^{2}) gross.
- Energen (independent acreage): 126,000 acres (as of February 2007)
- Highmount Exploration: unknown. The Conasauga acreage is a part of a larger purchase by Loews Corp., owner of Highmount, from Dominion in 2007.

=== Major development participants ===
- Highmount Exploration (Owned by Loews Corp. Corporation) Purchased from Dominion E&P assets)
- Northeast Alabama Gas District (Public Utility Gas District)
- Chesapeake Energy

== See also ==
- Natural gas fields
- Energy in the United States
- Geology of Alabama
- Geology of the Appalachians
- Shale gas in the United States
