= OBF =

OBF may refer to:

- OBF (band), 2012 rename of The Original Bucks Fizz
- Open Bioinformatics Foundation, non-profit organization supporting open source programming in bioinformatics.
- Oregon Bach Festival, an annual midsummer J. S. Bach festival in Eugene, Oregon
- Oregon Brewers Festival, an annual craft beer festival
- Out of Box Failure, computer hardware term
- Ordovician Bellefonte Formation, a rock formation in central Pennsylvania
- Oberpfaffenhofen Airport's IATA code
- Orthonormal Basis Function as in Hilbert space
