= Nittany Dolomite =

Geologic formation in the US

- Stratigraphic range: Ordovician
- Type: Formation
- Underlies: Axeman Limestone
- Overlies: Stonehenge Limestone

Location
- Region: Pennsylvania
- Country: United States

The Nittany Dolomite is a geologic formation in Pennsylvania. It preserves fossils dating back to the Ordovician period.

== See also ==
- List of fossiliferous stratigraphic units in Pennsylvania
- Paleontology in Pennsylvania
