= Everton Dolomite =

- Stratigraphic range: Ordovician
- Type: Formation
- Underlies: Dutchtown Formation and St. Peter Sandstone
- Overlies: Shakopee Dolomite

Lithology
- Primary: Dolomite

Location
- Region: Midwest
- Country: United States

The Everton Dolomite is a geologic formation in North America. Named after Everton, Arkansas, it is subsurface in southwestern Illinois and is exposed near Cape Girardeau, Missouri.
