= Geological mapping of Georgia (U.S. state) =

Geological mapping of Georgia is the creation of geological maps—special-purpose maps made to show geological features—of the State of Georgia in the United States. Rock units or geologic strata are shown by colors or symbols to indicate where they are exposed at the surface. Structural features such as faults and shear zones are also shown. Since the first national geological map, in 1809, there have been numerous maps which included the geology of Georgia. The first Georgia-specific geological map was created in 1825. The most recent state-produced geological map of Georgia, by the Georgia Department of Natural Resources is 1:500,000 scale, and was created in 1976 by the department's Georgia Geological Survey. It was generated from a base map produced by the United States Geological Survey. The state geologist and Director of the Geological Survey of Georgia was Sam M. Pickering, Jr. Since 1976, several geological maps of Georgia, featuring the state's five distinct geologic regions, have been produced by the federal government.

== History of geological mapping in Georgia ==
=== Previous statewide geological maps of Georgia ===
The first statewide geological map of Georgia was published in 1825. It was a 1:1,000,000 scale map of Georgia and Alabama published by Henry Schenck Tanner. In 1849 W.T. Williams published the geological features for the state on a 1:120,000 scale map within George White's (1849) Statistics of the State of Georgia report. Then in 1871, Dr. Matthew Fleming Stephenson published a 1:1,200,000 scale map of the Geology and mineralogy of Georgia through the Globe Publishing Company of Atlanta. This map was part of a report with the same name. Another statewide map of the geology of Georgia was published in 1876 by G. Little in the Handbook of the State of Georgia by T.P. Janes. In 1885 Georgia Commissioner of Agriculture J.T. Henderson produced a 1:2,500,000 scale map of the geology of Georgia. In 1895 R. T. Nesbitt produced a small-scale geological map of Georgia that was included in a statistical review of the state. The review was described as a Chamber of commerce styled work, that presented the economic mineral resources and geology of the state in a promotional and exaggerated manner. This was the last statewide geological map published in the 19th Century.

Within the 20th Century there were three statewide geological maps produced prior to the 1976 map. The first was a 1-inch to 15 mile map produced by S.W. McCallie in 1908. In 1939, George Willis Stose et al. produced a 1:500,000 scale map that was published by the Georgia Geologic Survey and the United States Geological Survey. This map was reprinted in 1960 by the U.S. Geological Survey. The third map was published in 1968 by the Geological Survey of Georgia. This map was produced by J.W. Smith and M.S. Green, a 1:2,500,000 scale map.

=== Geological maps that contained the geology of Georgia ===
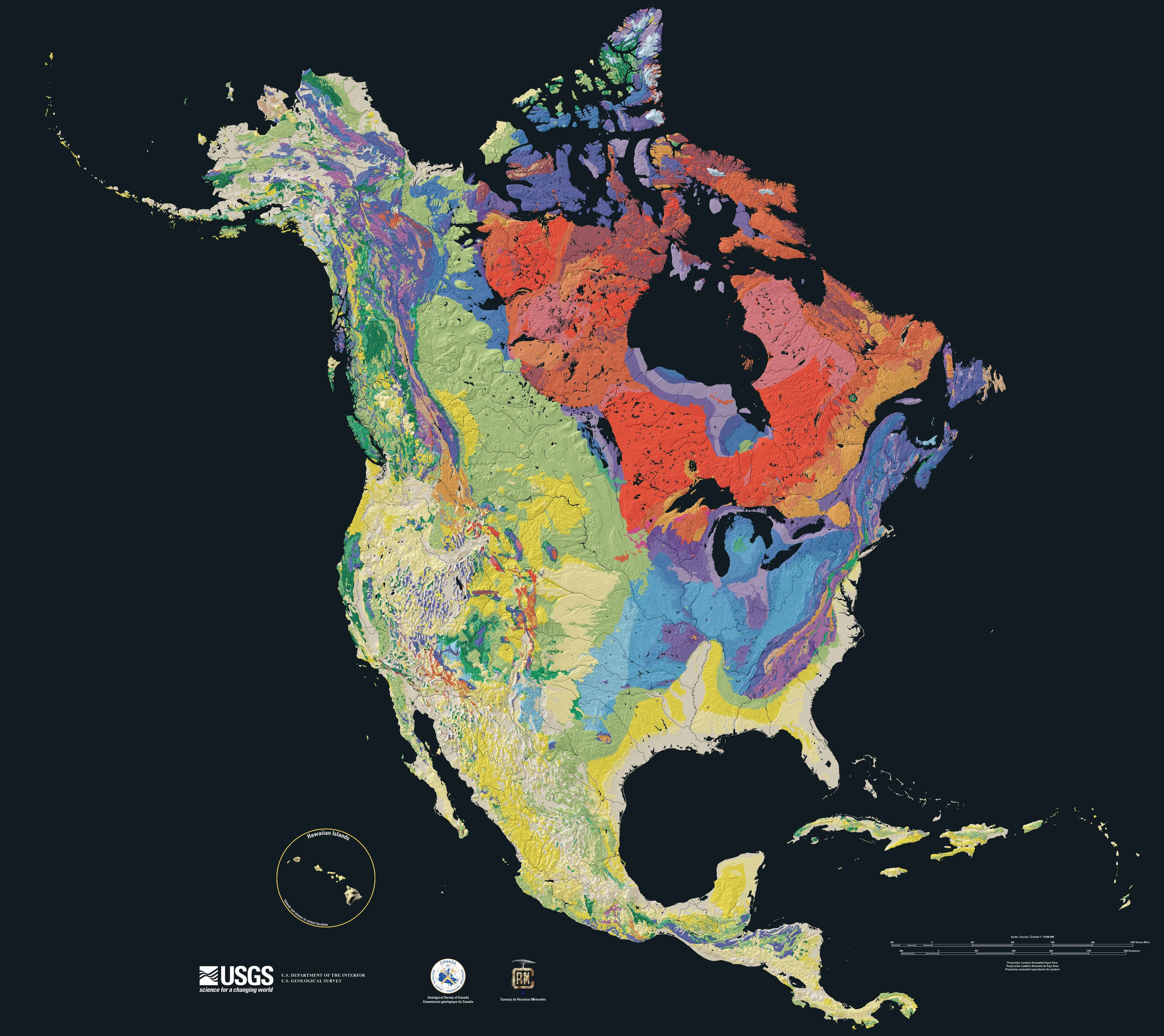
North American geological map

From the beginning of the United States, Georgia geology has been included in maps produced for the entire country. The first geological map of the U.S. was produced in 1809 by William Maclure. In 1807, Maclure undertook the self-imposed task of making a geological survey of the United States. He traversed and mapped nearly every state in the Union. During the rigorous two-year period of his survey, he crossed and recrossed the Allegheny Mountains some 50 times. The results of his unaided endeavor were submitted to the American Philosophical Society in a memoir entitled Observations on the Geology of the United States explanatory of a Geological Map, together with the nation's first geological map, which were published in the Society's journal Transactions, This precedes William Smith's geological map of England by six years, although Smith's map was constructed using a different classification of rocks. Several reports used Maclure's geological map to accompany their description of the geology of the U.S. (Beaujour, 1814 and Marcou, 1858). In 1816, within an elementary treatise of mineralogy and geology, Parker Cleaveland produced a geological map of the U.S. In 1843, Charles Moxon produced a small-scale geological map of the U.S., where Ami Boué produced a geological structure map of the globe. In 1853, Marcou produced a geological map of the U.S. and the British provinces of North America.

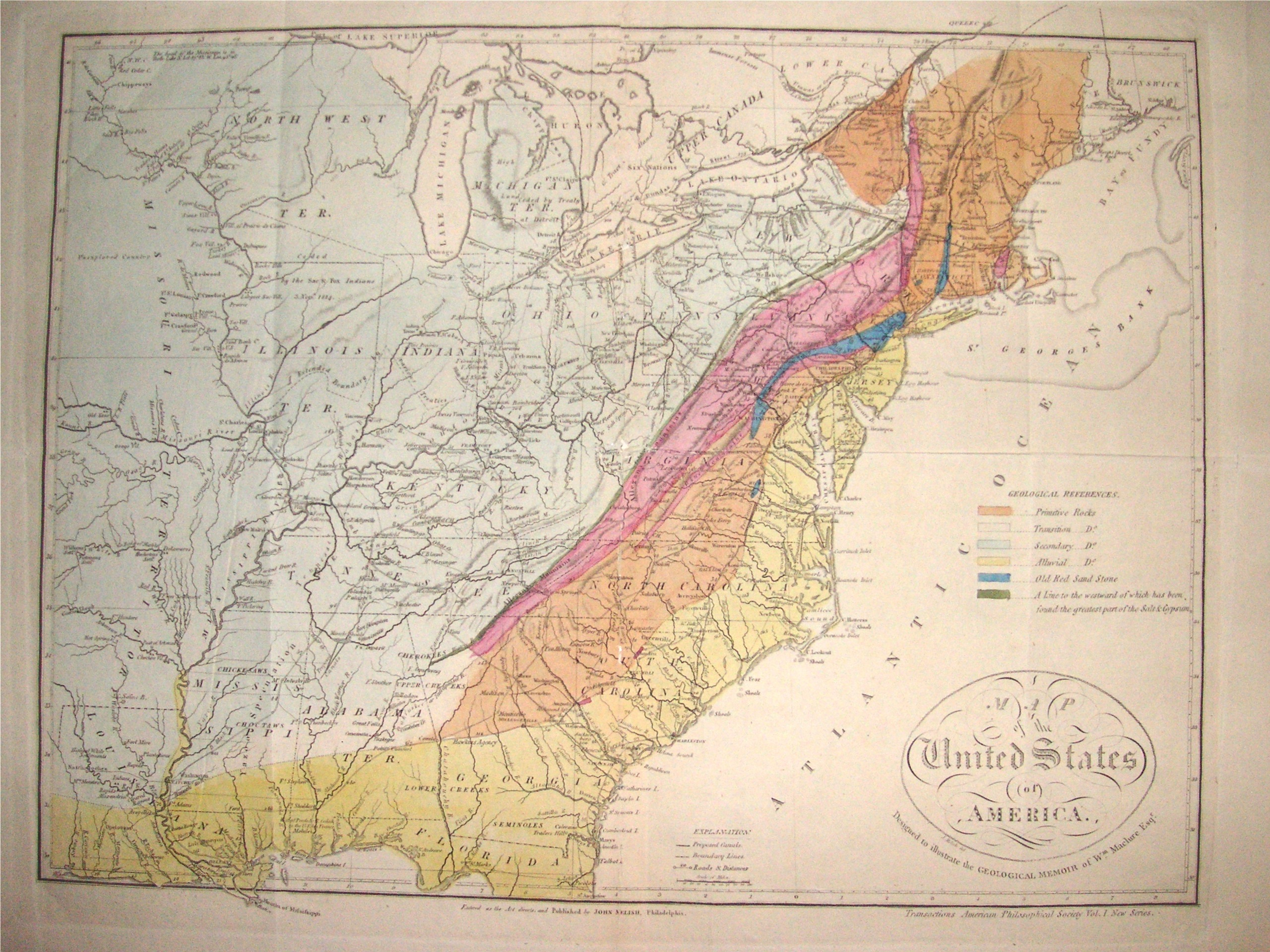
Maclure's Geological Map of the United States as published in 1817

In 1856, Henry Darwin Rogers created a similar map of the geology of the U.S. and British North America. There was a short description of the geological map of the U.S. by Charles Henry Hitchcock in 1872, which had small-scale geological maps included. Hitchcock and William P. Blake published a general geological map of the U.S. in R.W. Raymond's Statistics of mines and mining. In 1874, they published a geological map of the U.S. and territories in the U.S. Census 9th Statistical Atlas. Hitchcock and Blake published a summary of this map in the Geological Magazine in 1873. Gray's geological map of the U.S. was published in the National Atlas special edition at a scale of about 1 inch to 300 miles in 1876 and reprinted in 1886 by the American Institute of Mining Engineers. A geological map of the U.S. east of the Rocky Mountains was produced at the scale of 1 inch to 105.5 miles by Frank H. Bradley. In the 1880s several geological maps of the U.S. were produced. William John McGee offered a detailed description for the U.S. Geological Survey in 1884. In 1887, Hitchcock produced a geological map of the U.S. and parts of Canada that was at the scale of 1 inch to 200 miles, with a review of the various maps of the U.S. that accompanied the geological map of the U.S. In 1895, McGee and J.B. Tolbert produced a 1:15,000,000 scale map of the geology of the U.S.

There have been a host of geological maps of the U.S. produced in the 20th century. Bailey Willis produced a geological map of the U.S. in 1906. George W. Stose produced a 1:2,500,000 scale map in 1932, and a 1:500,000 scale map together with R.W. Smith in 1939. A.K. Lobeck produced a Geological map of the United States (with text on the reverse side) in 1941 Those are just a few that have been produced. The most recent map being produced is the National Map that is a cooperative project.

== The 1976 map ==
The current geological map of Georgia was produced in 1976. It was put together mainly in two parts from two teams representing the northern and southern portion of the state.

The map of Georgia is actually a compilation of numerous geological studies and mapping projects that occurred throughout the state and over an extended time period. The major studies that are cited for contribution to the state geological map fall under three main categories: New mapping by the Georgia Geological Survey, new mapping by the Georgia Geological Survey combined with revised published maps, and published maps with compilation revision only. The majority of the rock units shown on the 1976 map were mapped in 1973 by reconnaissance methods. For some areas, previous authors provided more detailed work than the reconnaissance conducted by the geological survey staff. In those areas, the original author's work was used in compiling the state map.

== Recent geological mapping in the state of Georgia ==
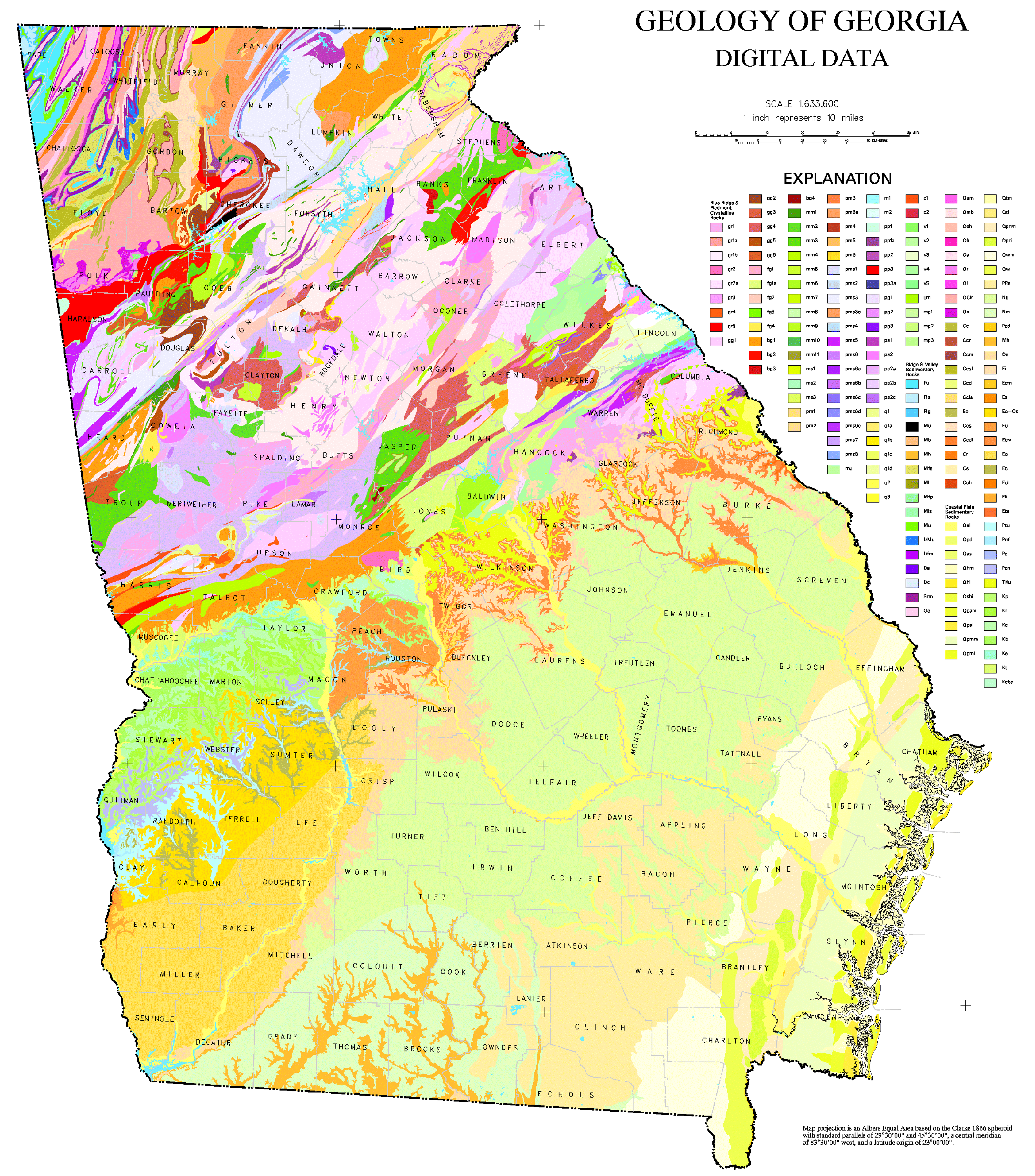
Map produced by the U.S. Department of the Interior

More recently, geological mapping has been undertaken by the Georgia Geological Survey through the STATEMAP project. This project was funded from the National Geologic Mapping Act of 1992. This federal act was for the purpose of producing geological maps that for 2 decades had been drastically curtailed. It was recognized that "geologic maps are the primary data base for virtually all applied and basic earth-science applications". This act provided 50% of the funds needed, whereas each state that wanted to participate supplied the other 50% of the funding to complete these various mapping projects. Ultimately this project was to be a part of the National Map and the subsequent databases generated by the various state and national mapping projects.

== The geology of Georgia ==
The geology of Georgia consists of five distinct geologic regions, beginning in the northwest corner of the state and moving through the state to the southeast: the Ridge and Valley region also known as the Appalachian Plateau, the Blue Ridge, the Piedmont, the Fall Line and the Coastal Plain.

== See also ==
- Geology of Georgia (U.S. state)
- Georgia Department of Natural Resources
