= M. F. Stephenson =

American geologist

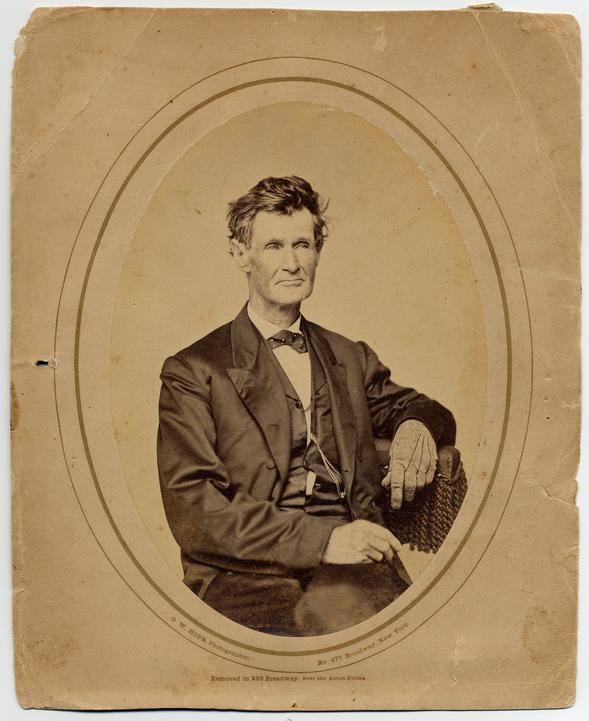
- Stephenson pictured between 1857 and 1860
- Born: Matthew Fleming Stephenson; 1802; Virginia, U.S.
- Died: 1881 (aged 78–79)
- Resting place: Alta Vista Cemetery, Gainesville, Georgia, U.S.
- Occupation: Assayer
- Employer: Dahlonega Mint
- Known for: Geology
- Notable work: Geology and Mineralogy of Georgia
- Spouse: Sarah Lyon Stephenson (married 1836)
- Children: 2

Matthew Fleming Stephenson (1802–1882) was an American miner, geologist, and mineralogist based in the US state of Georgia. He was one of the first collectors of lazulite, rutile, pyrophyllite, and other minerals. He encouraged people not to leave Georgia for the California Gold Rush, inspiring the phrase used by Mark Twain, "There's gold in them thar hills", which is commonly referenced in American popular culture.

Stephenson wrote various articles on his observations of minerals, as well as mound excavations in Georgia. In the 1870s, several of his articles were published by the Smithsonian Institution, including Account of Ancient Mounds in Georgia and Mounds in Bartow County near Cartersville, Georgia. These described sites he visited and the artifacts found at each, such as mica mirrors, copper vessels, and quartz. He also published a major treatise in 1871 called Geology and Mineralogy of Georgia for which he is most famous. Other published works include a pamphlet Diamonds and Precious Stones in Georgia in 1878 and a historical sketch in 1866, Report on the Lewis Mine Property, White County, Georgia.

He served as the assayer of the Dahlonega Mint in Dahlonega, Georgia in the 1840s. When the gold rush in Georgia was believed to be over, many miners headed west to join the 1849 California Gold Rush. Stephenson thought differently and in the town square proclaimed to over 200 men, "Why go to California? In that ridge lies more gold than man ever dreamt of. There's millions in it." This excerpt was retold to Mark Twain by the miners who moved to California from Georgia and may have inspired his character Mulberry Sellers from his 1892 novel The American Claimant. Sellers was famous for his lines "There's gold in them thar hills" and "there's millions in it."

Stephenson was born in Virginia. In 1836, he married Sarah Elizabeth Sumter Lyon. There is no record of Stephenson receiving formal education in the field of geology.

== See also ==
- Geologic map of Georgia
- Georgia Gold Rush
