= Henry Schenck Tanner =

American cartographer (1786–1858)

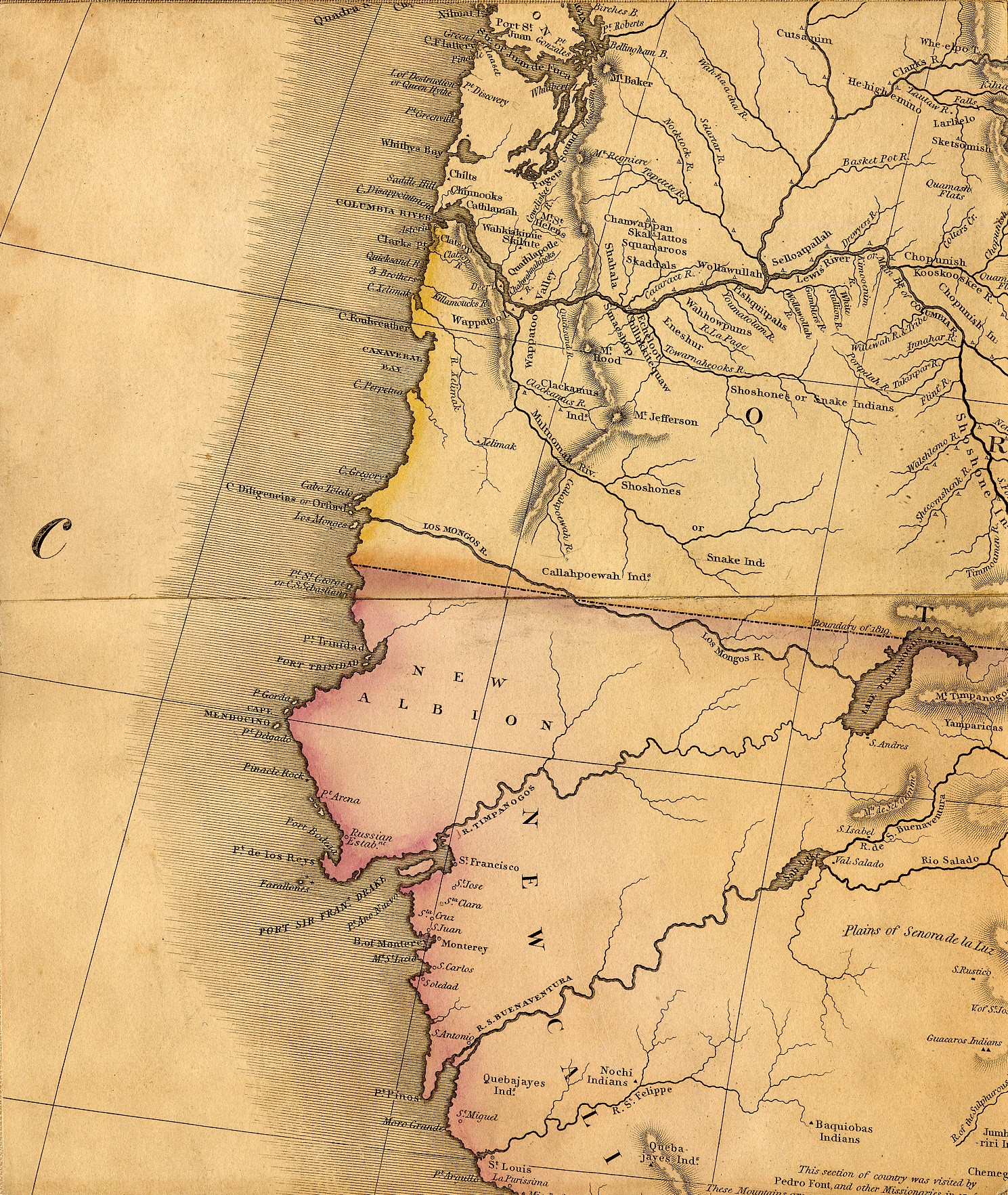
Part of Tanner's 1822 map of North America, depicting the Pacific coast with fictive rivers that were assumed to exist at that time.

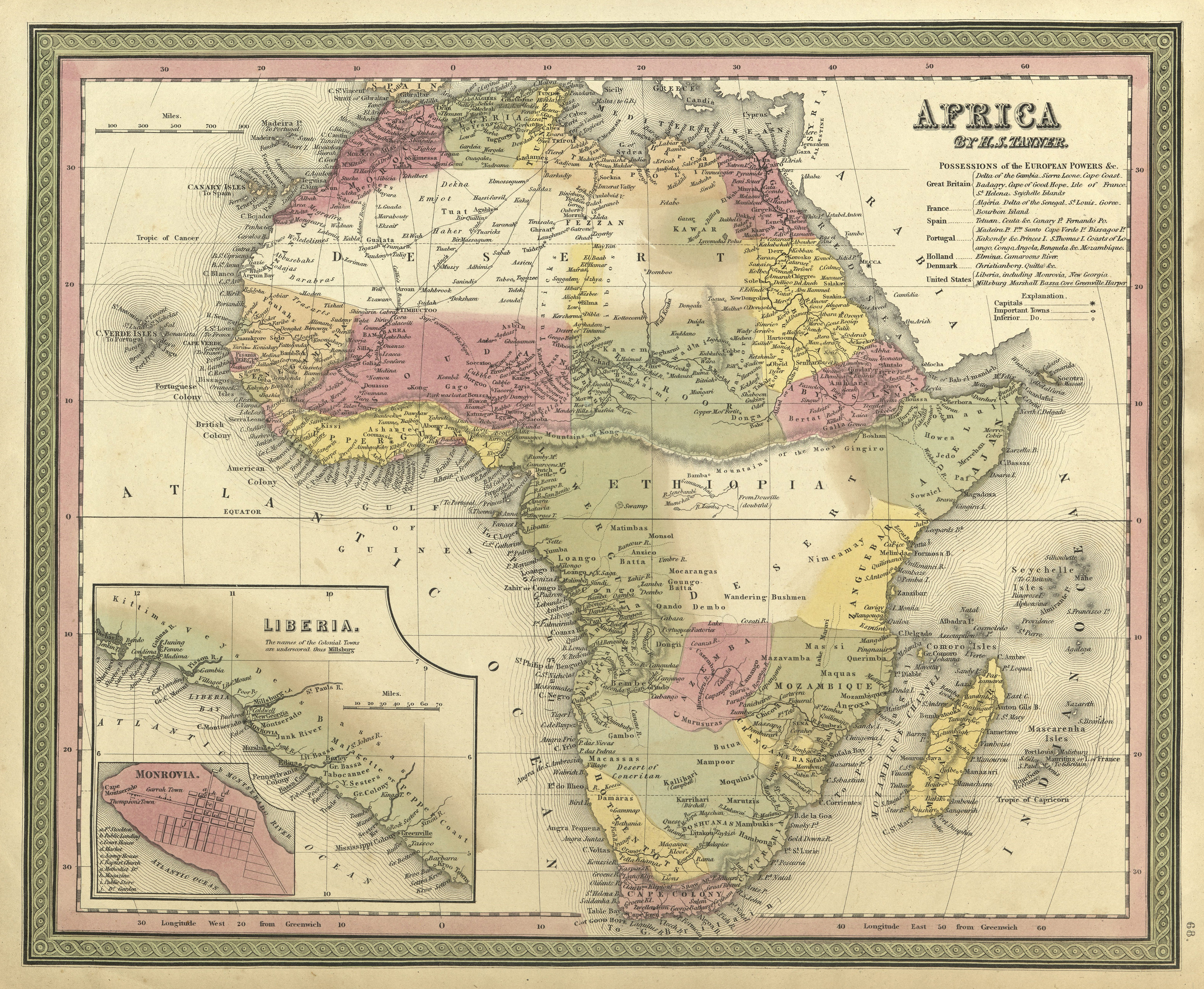
Tanner's 1847 map of Africa

Henry Schenck Tanner (c. 1786–1858), was an American cartographer, born in New York City.

He produced A Geographical and Statistical Account of the Epidemic Cholera from its Commencement in India to its Entrance into the United States in 1832 in response to the worldwide cholera epidemic of 1817.

Tanner wished to provide a geographic account of the spread of the disease, stating that other statistics concerning the epidemic were "given in such a loose and unconnected manner as to render a reference to them at once irksome and unprofitable." His publication included global, national and local maps, data tables showing number of deaths in different localities by country, and detailed maps of the United States and New York City with small red dots indicating points where the disease had broken out.

Tanner and his colleague John Vallance engraved the maps of the United States that were produced between 1816 and 1823 by geographer John Melish in Philadelphia and that were among the first widely spread US maps to include the West Coast territories then belonging to Mexico. Based on the southwestern corner of this US map, Tanner himself produced a map of Mexico in 1822, which was accepted by the Mexican Congress in 1826 and translated to Spanish by 1828. In 1846 Tanner had this map reprinted in a Second and Third Edition. This became the basis for the map of Mexico by John Disturnell in 1847, used in the boundary negotiations of the U.S. and Mexico following the Mexican–American War. Tanner's map contained some errors, reproduced by Disturnell.

Tanner engraved more maps of the United States on the county- and state-level in the 1820s and 1830s (among these, maps of Washington D.C., New Jersey, Pennsylvania, Missouri, Connecticut, New York, North and South Carolina, Florida and Tennessee). He also published An atlas of ancient geography in 1826, containing 16 maps of Egypt, Greece, Holy Land and the Roman Empire in ancient times.

For Stephen F. Austin, Tanner engraved and published a map of Texas in 1830 which was widely distributed. Modified several times, the Austin-Tanner map was kept up to date during the time of the Republic of Texas. Some other maps Tanner produced by 1840 were small-scale continental maps, covering for example the continents of Africa, Asia, Europe, South America, or the Pacific.

In 1846, Tanner published A New Universal Atlas.

== See also ==
- Geologic map of Georgia
