= Shady Dolomite =

Geologic formation in the United States

- Stratigraphic range: Cambrian Series 2: 521–509 Ma
- Type: Geological formation
- Sub-units: Austinville, Patterson, and Ivanhoe Members
- Underlies: Rome Formation, Elbrook Formation
- Overlies: Weisner Quartzite, Chilhowee Group

Lithology
- Primary: Dolomite
- Other: Limestone and Shale

Location
- Region: Appalachia and Southeastern United States

Type section
- Named for: Shady Valley, Tennessee, USA
- Named by: Arthur Keith - 1903
- Country: United States

The Shady Dolomite is a geologic formation composed of marine sedimentary rocks of early Cambrian age (Cambrian Series 2: 521-509 million years ago). It outcrops along the eastern margin of the Blue Ridge province in the southeastern United States and can be found in outcrops in the states of Alabama, Georgia, Tennessee, North Carolina, and Virginia. It can also be found in the subsurface of Kentucky, Ohio, and West Virginia. The Shady is predominantly composed of dolomite and limestone with lesser amounts of mudrock. It contains fossils of trilobites, archaeocyathids, algae, brachiopods, and echinoderms, along with the enigmatic fossil Salterella. The Shady Dolomite was first described by Arthur Keith in 1903 and was named for exposures in the Shady Valley of Johnson County in the state of Tennessee. Near Austinville, Virginia, the Shady hosts ore deposits that have been mined extensively for lead and zinc ore.

== Depositional Environment ==
The Shady Dolomite was deposited on the margin of the paleocontinent of Laurentia. The rocks that make up the Shady represent sediment deposition on and around an ancient carbonate platform.

The initial carbonate sedimentation of the Shady began on the southern shelf of Laurentia and formed on top of the siliciclastic sequence that now make up the rocks of the Chilhowee Group. These carbonate sediments formed a carbonate ramp that over time developed into a rimmed carbonate shelf.

== Economic Importance ==
=== Austinville-Ivanhoe District ===
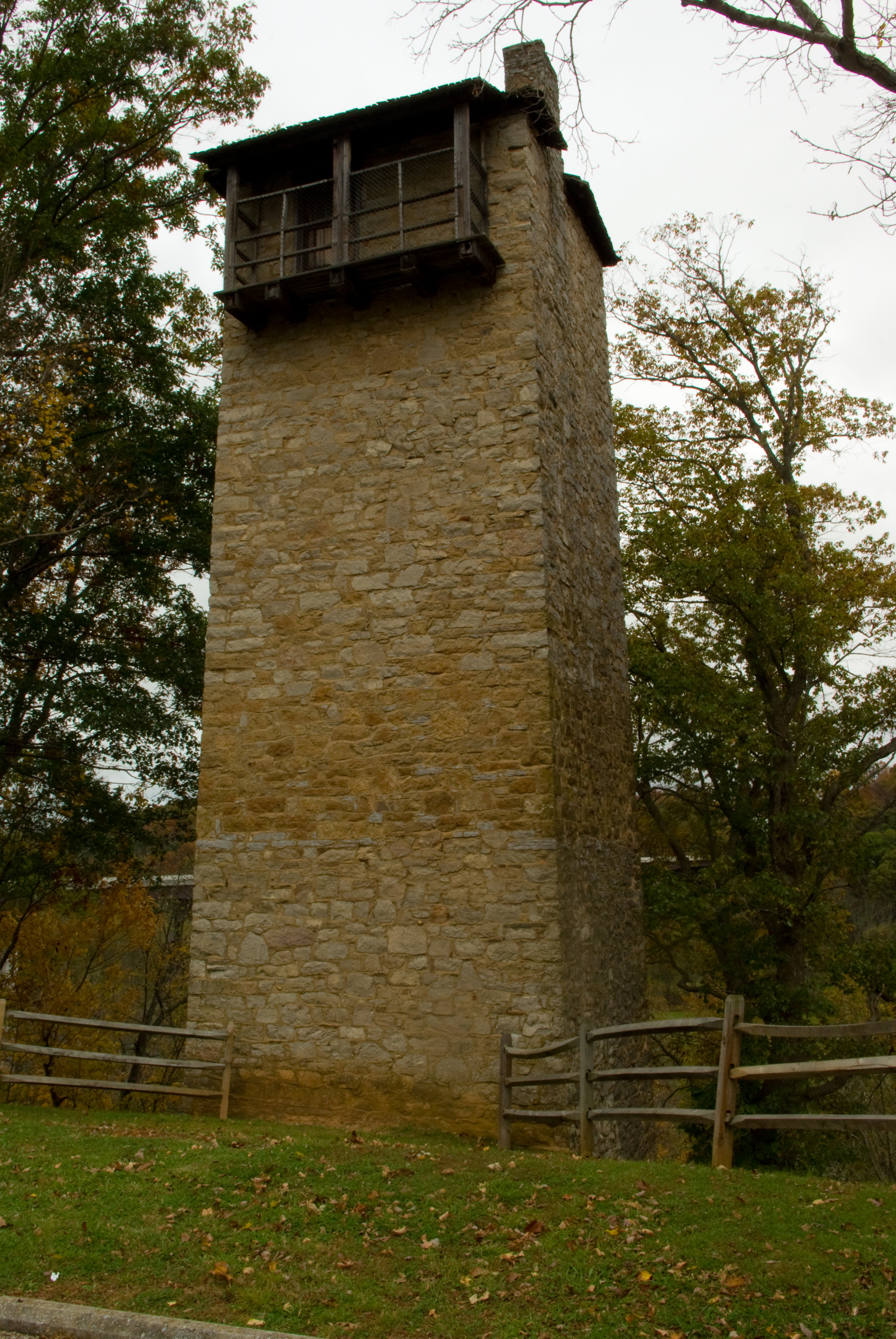
The Jackson Ferry Shot Tower on the New River in Wythe County, Virginia. Lead ore from the Shady Dolomite was used to make shot here in starting in the early 1800s.

Lead and zinc ore bodies of the Austinville-Ivanhoe District occur in the Shady Dolomite in the vicinity of Austinville, Virginia. They are classified as Mississippi Valley Type deposits. The main ore minerals include sphalerite, galena, and hemimorphite. Formation of the ore deposits likely occurred when warm and saline groundwater moved through the Shady in the Late Paleozoic during the Alleghanian orogeny.

Mining of the deposit began in 1756 both on the surface and underground. Over 21,000 tons of lead were mined from the district through the 1860s. During the American Civil War, lead from these mines was used to make ammunition for the Confederate States of America. Following the war, the Bertha Mineral Company took over the mining operations mined zinc from oxidized ores of hemimorphite. The New Jersey Zinc Company acquired the site in 1902 and mined both lead and zinc through 1981. Since the 1980s, dolostone been quarried and taken from existing tailings piles on the site for agricultural use.

== See also ==
- List of fossiliferous stratigraphic units in Virginia
- Paleontology in Virginia
