= Copper Ridge Dolomite =

Cambrian era geologic formation in the Southeastern United States

- Stratigraphic range: Cambrian
- Type: Formation
- Underlies: Beekmantown Dolomite and Knox Dolomite
- Overlies: Conasauga Group

Location
- Region: Appalachia and Southeastern United States
- Country: United States
- Extent: Alabama, Mississippi, Virginia, and West Virginia

The Copper Ridge Dolomite is a geologic formation in Alabama. It preserves fossils dating back to the Cambrian Period.

== See also ==
- List of fossiliferous stratigraphic units in Alabama
- Paleontology in Alabama
