= Bellefonte Formation =

Pennsylvania Geologic Formation

- Stratigraphic range: Lower Ordivician
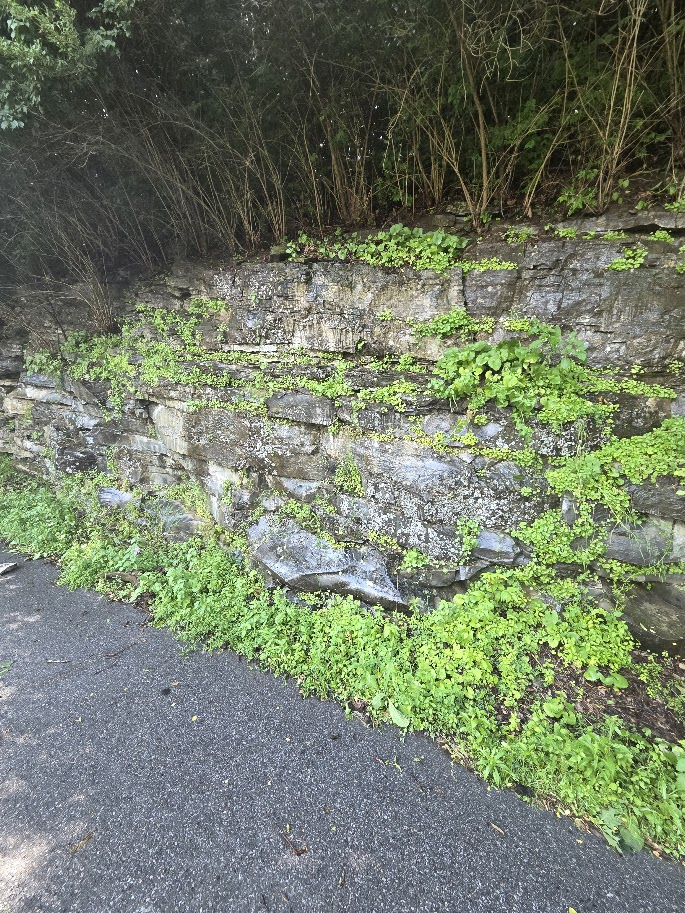
- Bellefonte Formation outcrop Mackeyville, PA
- Type: Formation
- Unit of: Beekmantown Group
- Sub-units: Tea Creek Mbr; Coffee Run Mbr
- Underlies: Loysburg Formation
- Overlies: Axeman Formation
- Thickness: 50' - 2,145'

Lithology
- Primary: Dolomite, Limestone
- Other: Sandstone, Chert

Location
- Region: Maryland, Pennsylvania, Virginia
- Country: United States

Type section
- Named for: Bellefonte, Pennsylvania

The Ordovician Bellefonte Formation is a mapped bedrock unit in central Pennsylvania. It is the uppermost unit of the Beekmantown Group. The top of the Bellefonte is marked by the Knox Unconformity.

== Description ==
The Bellefonte is defined as a medium-gray, brownish-weathering, medium-bedded dolomite and minor sandstone. The very fine grained Tea Creek Member lies above, and the crystalline Coffee Run Member lies below. The Tea Creek Member is a medium gray argillaceous limestone. While still a limestone it does have a high magnesium content. Mostly devoid of fossils. Beds of Chert maybe found about a third of the way through the Tea Creek Member.

=== Depositional environment ===
Deposition of formations such as the Bellefonte Dolomite occurred in environments equivalent to the modern Bahama lagoons, east of Miami.

== Age ==
Relative age dating places it in the Ordovician period. It rests atop the Axemann Formation, or the Nittany Formation. An example of this, is between Tyrone and Water Street, Pennsylvania. Here the Axemann is missing, and the Loysburg Formation conformably overlies the Bellefonte Formation.

== Fossils ==
Fossils are scarce in the Bellefonte. A few specimens have been found. Shells of a Hormotoma artemesia have been identified in the Bellefonte.

== See also ==
- Geology of Pennsylvania
