= Rome Formation =

Cambrian era geologic formation in Tennessee, United States

- Stratigraphic range: Cambrian
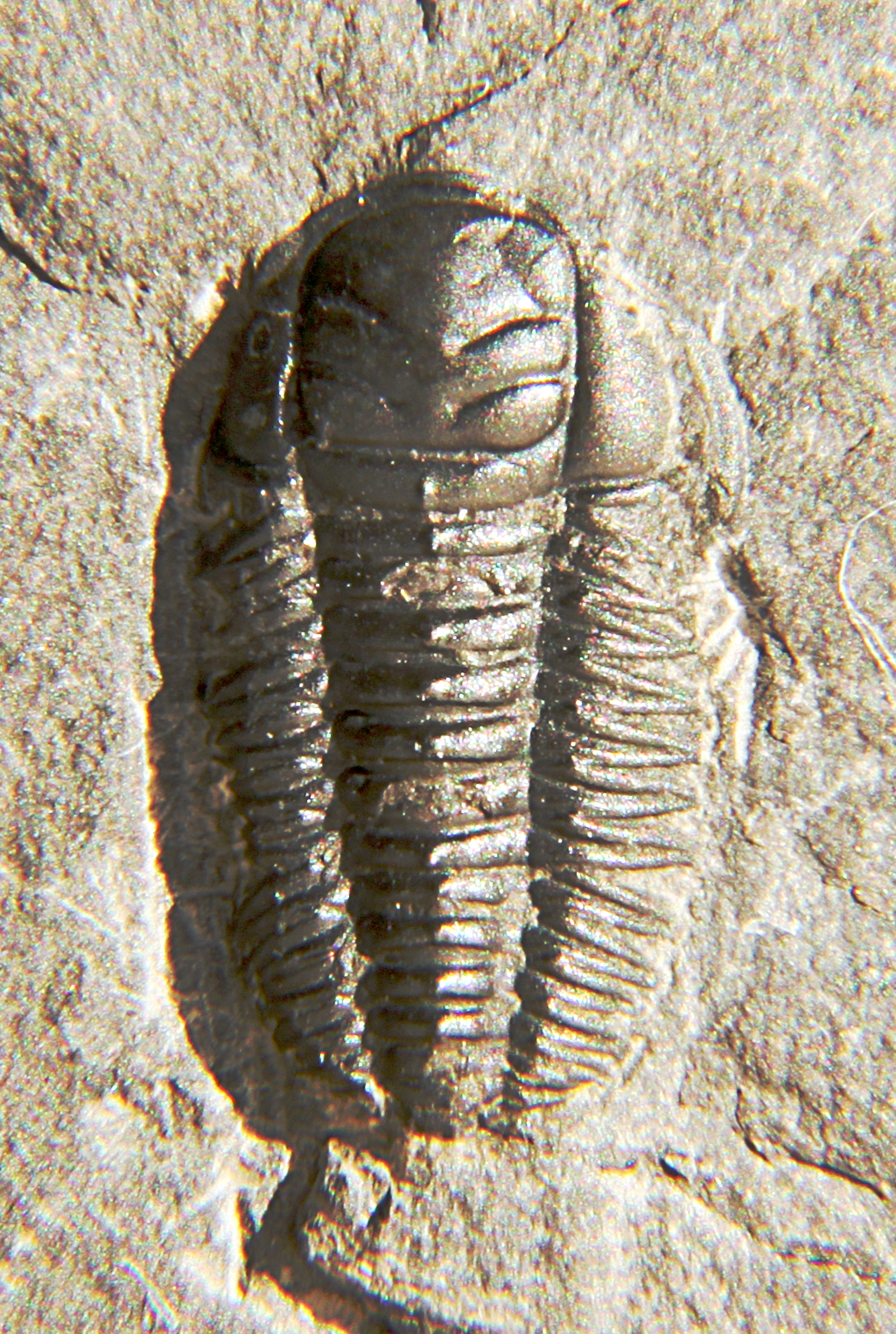
- Trilobite from the Rome Formation
- Type: Formation
- Underlies: Conasauga Formation
- Overlies: Mount Simon Sandstone and Shady Dolomite

Lithology
- Primary: sedimentary rocks

Location
- Region: Appalachia, Midwestern United States and Southeastern United States
- Country: United States
- Extent: Mississippi, Ohio, Tennessee, and Virginia

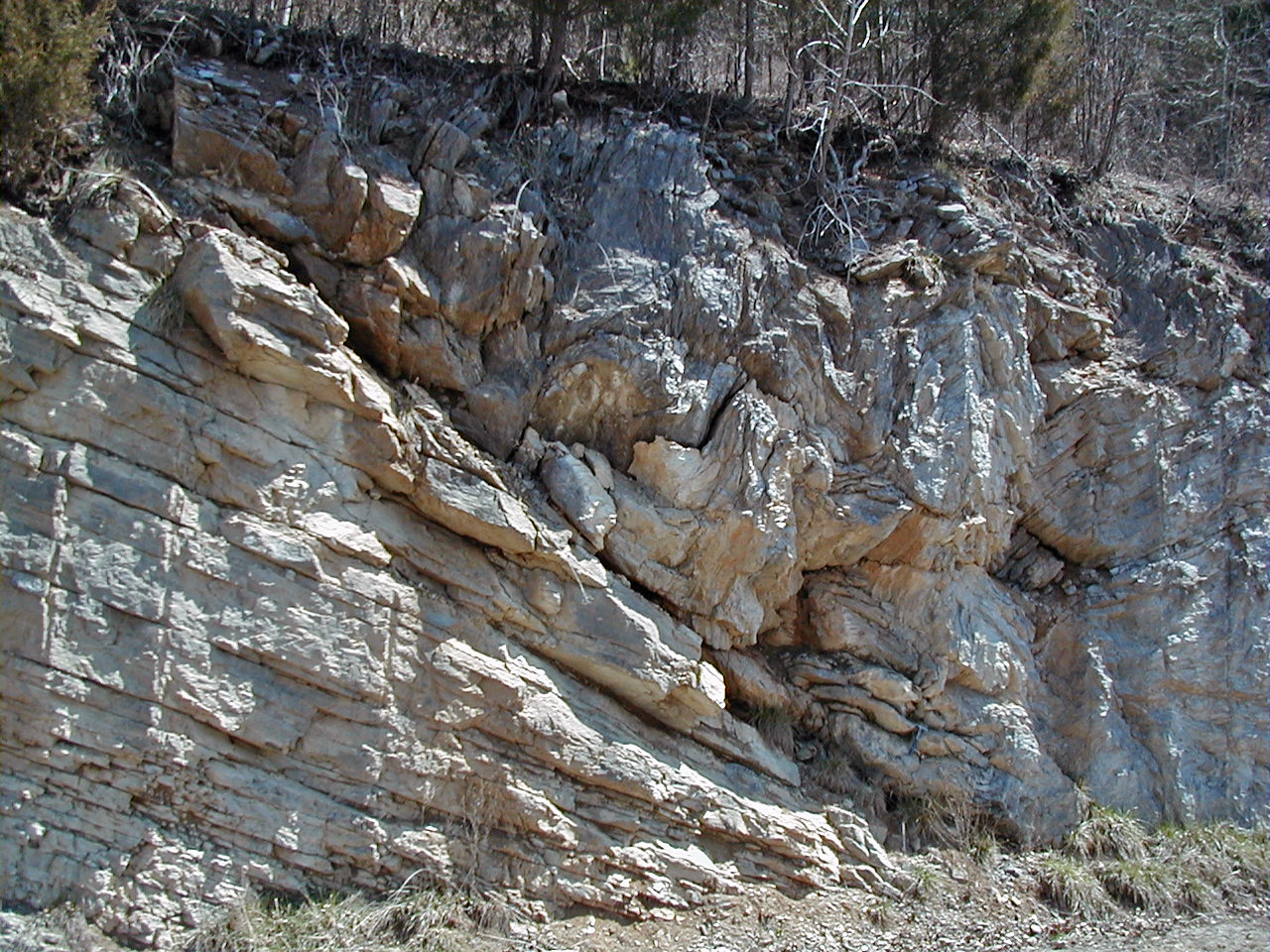
Thrust fault within the Rome Formation (Tennessee)

The Rome Formation is a geologic formation in Alabama, Georgia, and Tennessee. It preserves fossils dating back to the Cambrian period.

== See also ==
- List of fossiliferous stratigraphic units in Tennessee
- Paleontology in Tennessee
