= Conasauga Group =

Geologic group in West Virginia, United States

- Stratigraphic range: Cambrian
- Type: Group
- Underlies: Copper Ridge Dolomite and Knox Group
- Overlies: Rome Group

Location
- Region: West Virginia
- Country: United States

The Conasauga Group is a geologic group in West Virginia. It dates back to the Cambrian period.
