= Knox Supergroup =

Widespread geologic group in the Southeastern United States

- Stratigraphic range: Late Cambrian–Dapingian; ~497–470.0 Ma
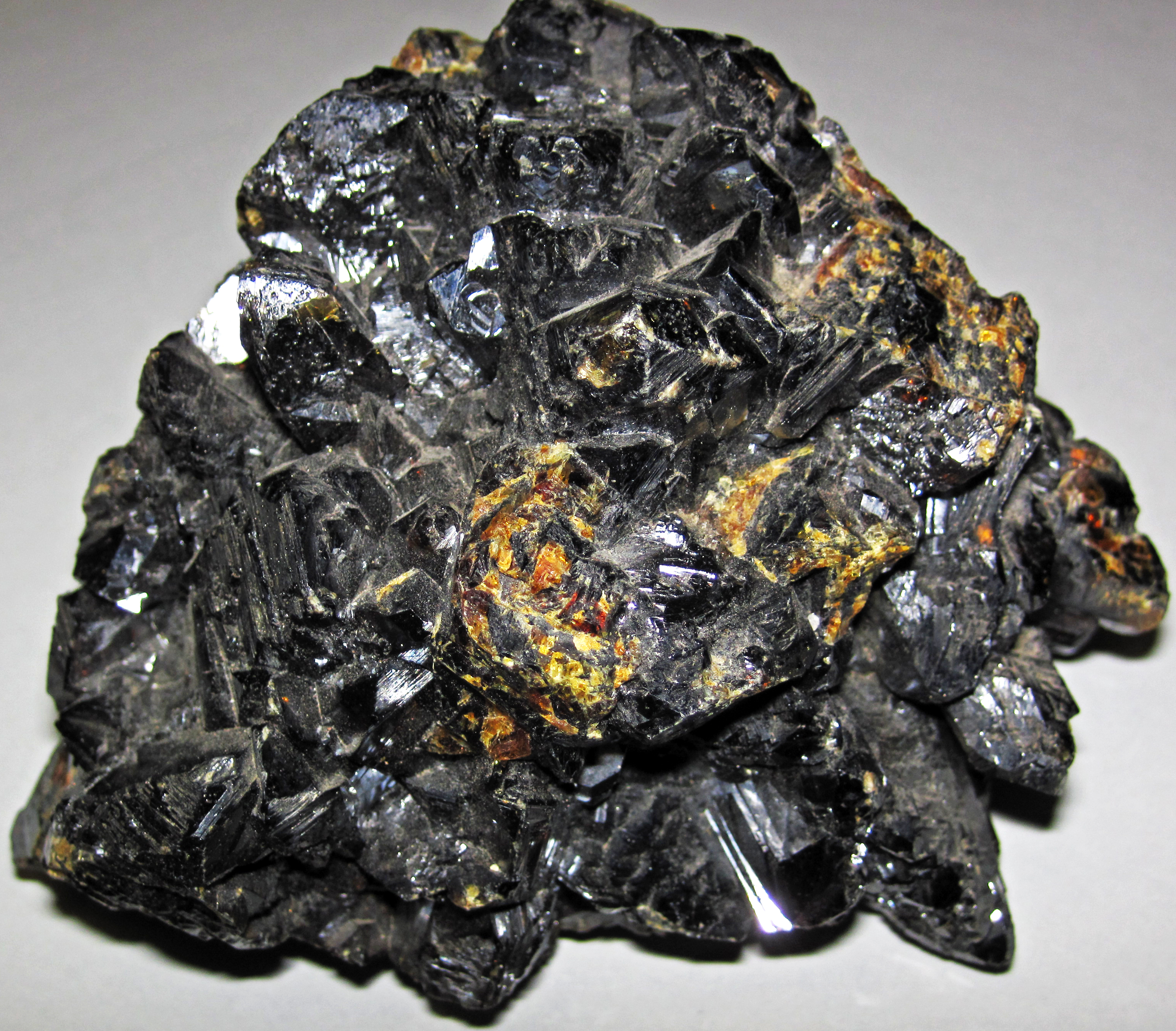
- Sphalerite from the Knox Superroup, Tennessee
- Type: Supergroup
- Unit of: Sauk
- Sub-units: Kentucky: Everton Dolomite; Cotter Dolomite; Beekmantown Group; Jefferson City Dolomite; Roubidoux Formation; Gasconade Dolomite; Gunter Sandstone; Copper Ridge Dolomite; Ohio, West Virginia and Eastern Kentucky: Beekmantown Dolomite; Rose Run Formation; Copper Ridge Dolomite; Pennsylvania: Beekmantown Group; Bellefonte Formation; Nittany Dolomite; Stonehenge Dolomite; Chepultepec Dolomite; Copper Ridge Dolomite; Indiana and Illinois: Everton Dolomite; Prairie do Chien Group; Shakopee Dolomite; New Richmond Sandstone; Oneota Dolomite; Potosi Dolomite; Other: Gunter Formation/Rose Run Formation; Copper Ridge Dolomite; Shakopee Dolomite; Oneota Dolomite
- Underlies: Ancel Group, Wells Creek Dolomite
- Overlies: Eau Claire Formation; Conasauga Group

Lithology
- Primary: Dolomite
- Other: Limestone and sandstone

Location
- Region: Indiana, Illinois, Kentucky, New York, Ohio, Pennsylvania, West Virginia
- Country: United States

Type section
- Named for: Knox County, Tennessee
- Named by: Safford (1869, p. 151)

The Knox Supergroup, also known as the Knox Group and the Knox Formation, is a widespread geologic group in the Southeastern United States. The age is from the Late Cambrian to the Early Ordovician. Predominantly, it is composed of carbonates, chiefly dolomite, with some limestone. There are also cherty inclusions as well as thin beds of sandstone.

== Stratigraphy ==
The Knox lies beneath a unconformity known as the Knox Unconformity. There is well-developed karst topography at the top of the Knox Supergroup. This demonstrates a prolonged period of erosion. This has modern economic impact because of forming reservoirs for hydrocarbons as well as some mineral deposits.

=== Everton Formation ===
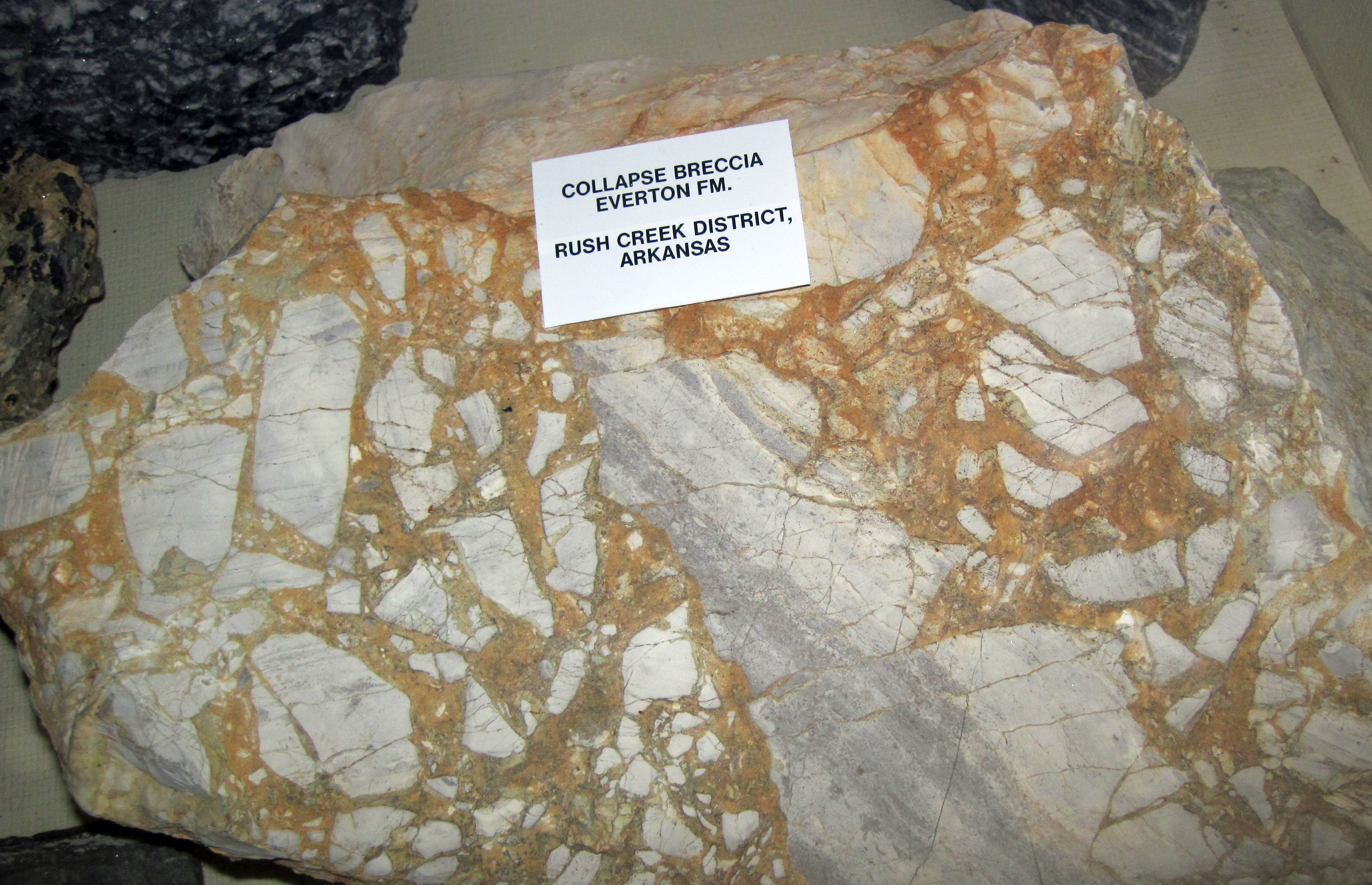
Collapse breccia (Everton Formation, Middle Ordovician; Rush Creek District, Arkansas, USA) 1

The Everton Formation is a geologic formation in northern Arkansas through Missouri, Illinois and Indiana that dates to the middle Ordovician Period. It was named by Ulrich (1907) for exposures found around Everton, Arkansas. Fossils of Conodonts Paraprioniodus costatus and Leptochirognathus quadratus indicate Whiterockian age. Unconformities separate this formation from the underlying Powell Formation and the overlying St. Peter Sandstone Formation. The Everton Formation is composed primarily of dolomite, limestone, and some sandstone as well as a zone of breccia. There are local thick sections of a friable sandstone. The grains are nearly identical to the overlying St. Peter Sandstone, and may cause some confusion in identifying the different formations. The sand grains are medium grained, well rounded and are frosted. Fossils of ostracods, cephalopods, gastropods, bivalves, trilobites, and bryozoans are preserved within the formation.

==== Stratigraphy ====
Five named members of the Everton Formation are recognized (in stratigraphic order):

- Jasper Limestone Member
- Newton Sandstone Member
- Calico Rock Sandstone Member
- Kings River Sandstone Member
- Sneeds Limestone Lentil

=== Beekmantown Group ===
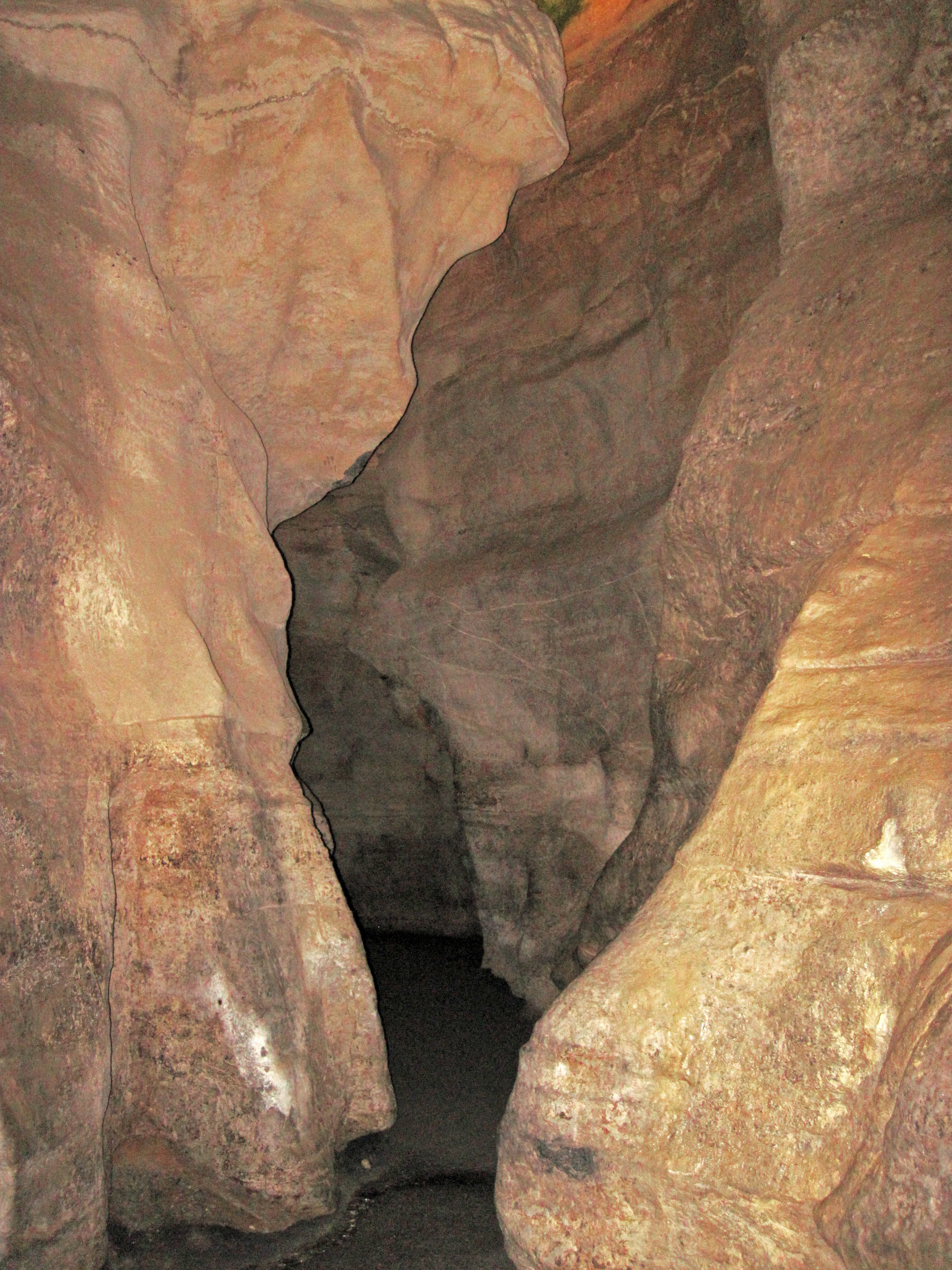
Canyon passage in Skyline Caverns, Rockdale Run Formation, Beekmantown Group

The Beekmantown Group is the upper unit of the Knox Supergroup. It is a late Cambrian to lower–middle Ordovician geologic group that occurs in the eastern Canada (Québec) and northeastern United States, datable from its conodont fauna. It contains dolomitic sandstones and carbonates from just off land from the palaeocoastline. Most likely the Arbuckle Arbuckle Group of Oklahoma, and Ellenburger Group of Texas are equlivant to the Beekmantown.

The usage of the term is diverse and depends on the state or region in question, and the group encompasses different formations in different regions. In some states it is considered a formation rather than a group, but the lithology varies by region.

In Pennsylvania the Beekmantown is broken down into the Bellefonte Formation at the Knox Unconformity, followed by the either the Axemann Formation or the Nittany Dolomite, with the Stonehenge Dolomite at its base. The Stonehenge is stratigraphically equitant to the Chepultepec Formation.

==== Mining and Industrial materials ====
Zinc is mined in outcrops found in Virginia. Mostly in Augusta, Rockingham, and Shenandoah counties. The largest is the Bowers-Campbell Mine.

Within the breccia zone galena is extracted along with small amounts of sphalerite and pyrite.

The Beekmantown is quarried in many locations for aggregate and rock.

=== Chepultepec Formation ===
The Chepultepec Formation is an Early Ordovician-aged geological formation in the Appalachian regions of Eastern North America. Also known as the Chepultepec Dolomite, it is a unit of the Upper Knox Group, overlying the Copper Ridge Dolomite and underlying the Longview-Kingsport-Mascot sequence. The formation was named by E. O. Ulrich in 1911 for the town of Chepultepec (now Allgood).

The Chepultepec Formation is a primarily limestone and dolomite formation, the earliest formation of the Ordovician period in its area. Further north, it is equivalent to the Stonehenge Formation of the Beekmantown Group. The formation was first described from Allgood, and has also been found in Tennessee and Virginia. In Virginia, the Chepultepec Formation has a habit of forming large natural arches, including Natural Tunnel in Scott County and Natural Bridge in Rockbridge County.

=== Prairie du Chien Group ===
This group includes the Oneota Formation and the Shakopee Formation.

==== Oneota Formation ====
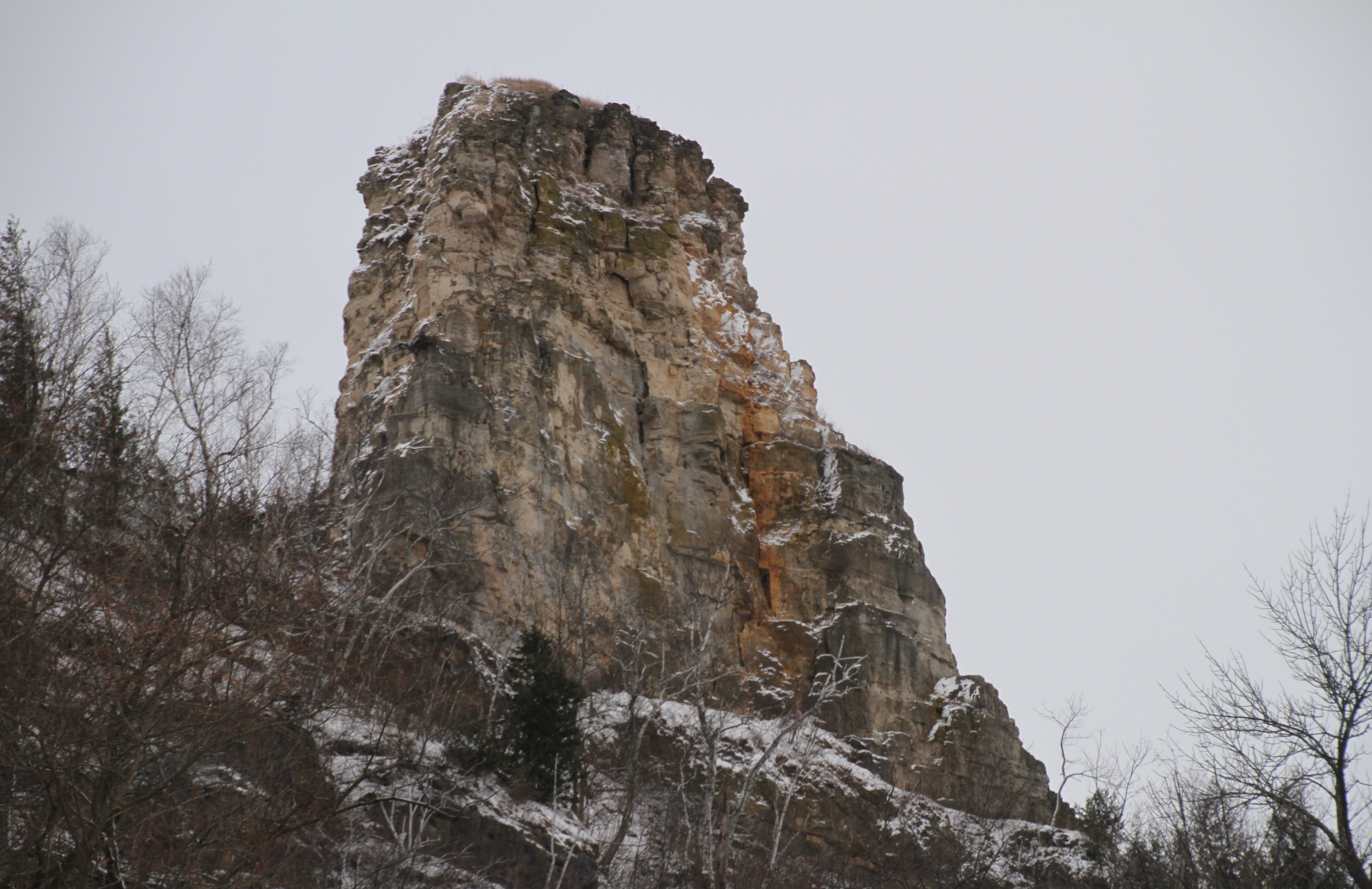
Sugar Loaf

The Oneota Formation is a geologic formation in the upper Midwest (United States) including Minnesota, Illinois, Indiana and Wisconsin. It preserves marine fossils dating back to the Ordovician period.

The Sugar Loaf landmark located in Winona, Minnesota is made of Oneota Dolomite.

==== Shakopee Formation ====
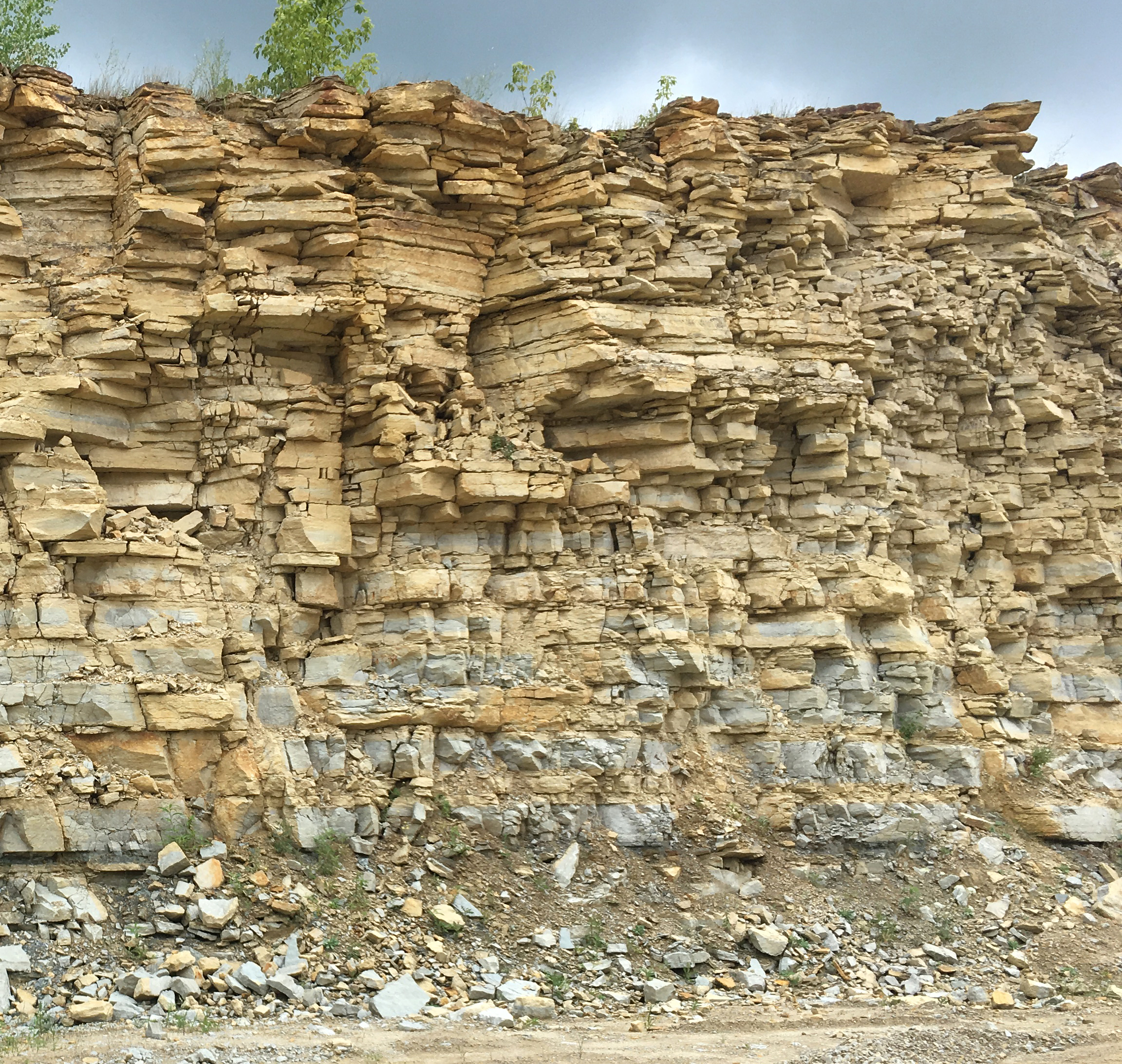
Shakopee Formation in southeast Minnesota

The Shakopee Formation is a geologic formation in Illinois, Indiana, Wisconsin, and Minnesota. It preserves fossils dating back to the Ordovician period. It is named after the town of Shakopee, Minnesota, where the formation can be seen in bluffs along the Minnesota River.

The formation is broken up into two members, the New Richmond and Willow River Members. The Shakopee was deposited in a peritidal setting and is divided by an unconformity. The unconformity left river valleys that were filled with siliciclastic material that was covered by marine deposits. Facies-defining cycles are divided into grainy carbonate, muddy carbonate, sandstone, shale, and Stromatolitic–Algal mat Boundstones.

Stromatolite reefs are a common occurrence in the Shakopee and are well documented throughout. Some of the recognized species of stromatolites are cryptozoon minnesotense, cryptozoon liberta and cryptozoon rosemontensis.

===== Fossils =====
- Mollusk
  - Murchisonia artemesia
  - Pleurotomaria canadensis
  - Lophospira cassina
  - Cameroceras stillwaterense
  - Cotteroceras compressum
  - Cyptendoceras ruedemanni
